= Ethiopia national badminton team =

National badminton team representing Ethiopia

Ethiopia
- Association: Ethiopian Badminton Federation (EBF)
- Confederation: BCA (Africa)
- President: Bahar Jibril Abdurahman

BWF ranking
- Current ranking: Unranked (2 April 2024)
- Highest ranking: 64 (7 January 2013)

African Mixed Team Championships
- Appearances: 1 (first in 2006)
- Best result: Group stage

The Ethiopia national badminton team (Amharic: የኢትዮጵያ ብሔራዊ የባድሚንተን ቡድን) represents Ethiopia in international badminton team competitions. It is controlled by the Ethiopian Badminton Federation, the governing body for badminton in Ethiopia. The team was formed in the late 1990s following the establishment of the Ethiopian Badminton Federation.

The team made their first appearance at the African Badminton Championships in 2006. In 2007, the team made their debut at the African Games mixed team event. The Ethiopian men's and women's team also competed in the African qualifiers for the Thomas and Uber Cup in 2012 when the country hosted the tournament.

The Ethiopian junior team have had decent results in the junior circuit, achieving bronze in the African Junior Team Championships in 2005 and 2009.

== History ==
=== Men's team ===
In the 2012 Thomas Cup African Qualifiers, Ethiopia were drawn into Group A with South Africa, Egypt and Kenya. The team first lost 5–0 to Egypt then defeated Kenya 3–2. The team failed to make it past the group stage after losing 5–0 in their last match to South Africa.

=== Women's team ===
In the 2012 Uber Cup African Qualifiers, the team were drawn into Group A with South Africa, Mauritius and Uganda. The team failed to advance to the knockout stage after losing 5–0 to their opponents in the group.

=== Mixed team ===
Ethiopia competed in the 2006 African Mixed Team Championships but did not advance to the knockout stage. A year later, the team competed in the 2007 All-Africa Games but were eliminated in the group stages. In the 2011 All-Africa Games, the team were eliminated in the group stage after losing 5–0 to South Africa and 4–1 to Botswana. The team defeated Congo 4–1 to finish third in their group. The team were again eliminated in the group stages at the 2015 African Games after losing to Seychelles and Algeria.

In the 2019 African Games, the team lost 5–0 to Nigeria and Zambia but won 5–0 against Tunisia.

== Competitive record ==
=== Thomas Cup ===
Year	Round	Pos
1949 to 2010	Did not enter	
2012	Did not qualify	
2014	Did not enter	
2016	Did not enter	
2018	Did not enter	
2020	Did not enter	
2022	Did not enter	
2024	Did not enter	
2026	To be determined	
2028	To be determined	
2030	To be determined	

=== Uber Cup ===
Year	Round	Pos
1957 to 2010	Did not enter	
2012	Did not qualify	
2014	Did not enter	
2016	Did not enter	
2018	Did not enter	
2020	Did not enter	
2022	Did not enter	
2024	Did not enter	
2026	To be determined	
2028	To be determined	
2030	To be determined	

=== Sudirman Cup ===
Year	Round	Pos
1989 to 2023	Did not enter	
2025	To be determined	
2027	To be determined	
2029	To be determined	

=== African Games ===
==== Mixed team ====
Year	Round	Pos
2003	Did not enter	
2007	Group stage	9th
2011	Group stage	
2015	Group stage	
2019	Group stage	
2027	To be determined	

=== African Team Championships ===
==== Men's team ====
Year	Round	Pos
1979 to 2024	Did not enter	
2026	To be determined	
2028	To be determined	
2030	To be determined	

==== Women's team ====
Year	Round	Pos
1979 to 2024	Did not enter	
2026	To be determined	
2028	To be determined	
2030	To be determined	

==== Mixed team ====
Year	Round	Pos
1980 to 2004	Did not enter	
2006	Group stage	7th
2007	Did not enter	
2009	Did not enter	
2011	Did not enter	
2013	Did not enter	
2014	Did not enter	
2017	Did not enter	
2019	Did not enter	
2021	Did not enter	
2023	Did not enter	
2025	To be determined	
2027	To be determined	
2029	To be determined	

== Junior competitive record ==
=== Suhandinata Cup ===
Year	Round	Pos
2000 to 2024	Did not enter	
2025	To be determined	

=== African Youth Games ===
==== Men's team ====
Year	Round	Pos
2018	Did not enter	

==== Women's team ====
Year	Round	Pos
2018	Did not enter	

==== Mixed team ====
Year	Round	Pos
2014	Did not enter	

=== African Junior Team Championships ===
==== Mixed team ====
Year	Round	Pos
1979 to 1999	Did not enter	
2001	Group stage	
2003	Fourth place	4th
2005	Semi-finals	4th
2007	Did not enter	
2009	Semi-finals	4th
2011	Did not enter	
2013	Did not enter	
2016	Did not enter	
2021	Did not enter	
2022	Did not enter	
2024	To be determined	

== Players ==
=== Current squad ===
As of 2 January 2024

==== Men's team ====
Name	DoB/Age	Ranking of event		
Name	DoB/Age	MS	MD	XD
Endale Teklu	10 July 1996 (age 28)	-	-	-
Fanthhun Estefanos	14 July 1996 (age 28)	-	-	-
Ayene Birhane	12 January 1998 (age 27)	-	-	-
Kibrom Kebede	10 March 1997 (age 28)	-	-	-

==== Women's team ====
Name	DoB/Age	Ranking of event		
Name	DoB/Age	WS	WD	XD
Tigist Getachew	1 March 1997 (age 28)	-	-	-
Cheru Hibst	30 September 1999 (age 25)	-	-	-
Belete Melat	4 March 1998 (age 27)	-	-	-
Betlhem Solomon	12 December 2000 (age 24)	-	-	-
