= Zimbabwe national badminton team =

National badminton team representing Zimbabwe

Zimbabwe
- Association: Badminton Association of Zimbabwe (BAZ)
- Confederation: BCA (Africa)
- President: Chipo Zumburani

BWF ranking
- Current ranking: 71 ▼3 (2 April 2024)
- Highest ranking: 55 (3 January 2023)

African Mixed Team Championships
- Appearances: 6 (first in 1980)
- Best result: Fifth place (1980)

African Men's Team Championships
- Appearances: 4 (first in 1980)
- Best result: Fifth place (1980)

African Women's Team Championships
- Appearances: 4 (first in 1980)
- Best result: Champions (1980)

The Zimbabwe national badminton team (Shona: Chikwata chenyika cheZimbabwe badminton) represents Zimbabwe in international team competitions and is controlled by the Zimbabwe Badminton Association, the governing body for Zimbabwean badminton. It is affiliated with the Badminton Confederation of Africa (BCA).

== History ==
Badminton was first played in Zimbabwe around the early 1960s. The national team was revived in 2008 after the reformation of the Zimbabwe Badminton Association. The national team competed in the 2014 African Badminton Championships.

=== Men's team ===
The Zimbabwean men's team competed in the 2016 Africa Continental Team Badminton Championships. The team were grouped with South Africa, Mauritius and Réunion in Group A. The team finished on the bottom of the group and failed to advance to the quarter-finals. The team were also eliminated in the group stages two years later at the 2018 All Africa Men's Team Badminton Championships.

The team competed in the 2022 All Africa Men's Team Badminton Championships. They lost 5–0 to Mauritius and Zambia.

=== Women's team ===
In 1980, Zimbabwe clinched the women's team title at the 1980 African Badminton Championships in Beira after defeating Tanzania, Mozambique, Nigeria and Kenya.

In 2016, the women's team competed in the 2016 Africa Continental Team Badminton Championships. The team lost 5–0 to Mauritius and Ghana in the group stages. They competed in the 2022 All Africa Men's Team Badminton Championships. The team were grouped with Uganda, Egypt and Algeria. The team lost all of their matches to the opposing teams.

=== Mixed team ===
Zimbabwe debuted in the 1982 Commonwealth Games. They were eliminated in the group stages.

The mixed team competed at the 2014 African Badminton Championships. The team were drawn into Group A with South Africa, Seychelles, Botswana and Cameroon. The team first lost 5–0 to South Africa, then won 3–2 against the Cameroonian team. The team later lost 5–0 to Botswana and Seychelles, thus failing to qualify for the quarter-finals.

The team made their fourth appearance at the African Mixed Team Championships in 2023. The team placed as third best in the group after winning their tie against Lesotho.

== Competitive record ==
=== Thomas Cup ===
| Year | Round | Pos |
|---|---|---|
| 1949 to 1964 | Part of the United Kingdom | |
| 1967 to 2012 | Did not enter | |
| 2014 | Did not qualify | |
| 2016 | Did not qualify | |
| 2018 | Did not qualify | |
| 2020 | Did not enter | |
| 2022 | Did not qualify | |
| 2024 | Did not enter | |
| 2026 | Did not qualify | |
| 2028 | To be determined | |
| 2030 | To be determined | |

=== Uber Cup ===
| Year | Round | Pos |
|---|---|---|
| 1957 to 1963 | Part of the United Kingdom | |
| 1966 to 2012 | Did not enter | |
| 2014 | Did not qualify | |
| 2016 | Did not qualify | |
| 2018 | Did not qualify | |
| 2020 | Did not enter | |
| 2022 | Did not qualify | |
| 2024 | Did not enter | |
| 2026 | Did not qualify | |
| 2028 | To be determined | |
| 2030 | To be determined | |

=== Sudirman Cup ===
| Year | Round | Pos |
|---|---|---|
| 1989 to 2021 | Did not enter | |
| 2023 | Did not qualify | |
| 2025 | To be determined | |
| 2027 | To be determined | |
| 2029 | To be determined | |

=== Commonwealth Games ===
==== Men's team ====
| Year | Round | Pos |
|---|---|---|
| 1998 | Did not enter | |

==== Women's team ====
| Year | Round | Pos |
|---|---|---|
| 1998 | Did not enter | |

==== Mixed team ====
| Year | Round | Pos |
|---|---|---|
| 1978 | Did not enter | |
| 1982 | Group stage | 11th |
| 1986 | Did not enter | |
| 1990 | Did not enter | |
| 1994 | Did not enter | |
| 2002 | Did not enter | |
| 2006 | Did not enter | |
| 2010 | Did not enter | |
| 2014 | Did not enter | |
| 2018 | Did not enter | |
| 2022 | Did not enter | |
| 2026 | To be determined | |

=== African Games ===
==== Mixed team ====
| Year | Round | Pos |
|---|---|---|
| 2003 | Did not enter | |
| 2007 | Did not enter | |
| 2011 | Did not enter | |
| 2015 | Did not enter | |
| 2019 | Did not enter | |
| 2027 | To be determined | |

=== African Team Championships ===
==== Men's team ====
| Year | Round | Pos |
|---|---|---|
| 1979 | Did not enter | |
| 1980 | Fifth place | 5th |
| 1982 | Did not enter | |
| 1984 | Did not enter | |
| 1988 | Did not enter | |
| 2016 | Group stage | 7th |
| 2018 | Group stage | 12th |
| 2020 | Did not enter | |
| 2022 | Group stage | 10th |
| 2024 | Did not enter | |
| 2026 | Quarter-finals | 7th |
| 2028 | To be determined | |
| 2030 | To be determined | |

==== Women's team ====
| Year | Round | Pos |
|---|---|---|
| 1979 | Did not enter | |
| 1980 | Champions | 1st |
| 1982 | Did not enter | |
| 1984 | Did not enter | |
| 1988 | Did not enter | |
| 2016 | Group stage | 6th |
| 2018 | Group stage | 7th |
| 2020 | Did not enter | |
| 2022 | Group stage | 7th |
| 2024 | Did not enter | |
| 2026 | Group stage | 9th |
| 2028 | To be determined | |
| 2030 | To be determined | |

==== Mixed team ====
| Year | Round | Pos |
|---|---|---|
| 1980 | Fifth place | 5th |
| 1982 | Did not enter | |
| 1984 | Did not enter | |
| 1988 | Did not enter | |
| 1992 | Did not enter | |
| 1994 | Did not enter | |
| 1998 | Did not enter | |
| 2000 | Did not enter | |
| 2002 | Did not enter | |
| 2004 | Did not enter | |
| 2006 | Did not enter | |
| 2007 | Did not enter | |
| 2009 | Group stage | |
| 2011 | Did not enter | |
| 2013 | Did not enter | |
| 2014 | Group stage | 8th |
| 2017 | Group stage | 9th |
| 2019 | Group stage | 9th |
| 2021 | Did not enter | |
| 2023 | Group stage | 9th |
| 2025 | To be determined | |
| 2027 | To be determined | |
| 2029 | To be determined | |

**Red border color indicates tournament was held on home soil.

== Junior competitive record ==
=== Suhandinata Cup ===
| Year | Round | Pos |
|---|---|---|
| 2000 | Did not enter | |
| 2002 | Did not enter | |
| 2004 | Did not enter | |
| 2006 | Did not enter | |
| 2007 | Did not enter | |
| 2008 | Did not enter | |
| 2009 | Did not enter | |
| 2010 | Did not enter | |
| 2011 | Did not enter | |
| 2012 | Did not enter | |
| 2013 | Did not enter | |
| 2014 | Did not enter | |
| 2015 | Did not enter | |
| 2016 | Did not enter | |
| 2017 | Did not enter | |
| 2018 | Did not enter | |
| 2019 | Did not enter | |
| 2022 | Did not enter | |
| 2023 | Did not enter | |
| 2024 | Did not enter | |
| 2025 | Did not enter | |
| 2026 | Group stage | 46th of 47 |

=== Commonwealth Youth Games ===
==== Mixed team ====
| Year | Round | Pos |
|---|---|---|
| 2004 | Did not enter | |

=== African Youth Games ===
==== Men's team ====
| Year | Round | Pos |
|---|---|---|
| 2018 | Did not enter | |

==== Women's team ====
| Year | Round | Pos |
|---|---|---|
| 2018 | Did not enter | |

==== Mixed team ====
| Year | Round | Pos |
|---|---|---|
| 2014 | Did not enter | |

=== African Junior Team Championships ===
==== Mixed team ====
| Year | Round | Pos |
|---|---|---|
| 1979 | Did not enter | |
| 1980 | Did not enter | |
| 1982 | Did not enter | |
| 1984 | Did not enter | |
| 1993 | Fifth place | 5th |
| 1995 | Did not enter | |
| 1997 | Did not enter | |
| 1999 | Did not enter | |
| 2001 | Did not enter | |
| 2003 | Did not enter | |
| 2005 | Did not enter | |
| 2007 | Did not enter | |
| 2009 | Did not enter | |
| 2011 | Did not enter | |
| 2013 | Did not enter | |
| 2016 | Did not enter | |
| 2021 | Did not enter | |
| 2022 | Did not enter | |
| 2024 | Did not enter | |
| 2026 | Group stage | |

**Red border color indicates tournament was held on home soil.

== Staff ==
The following list shows the coaching staff for the Zimbabwe national badminton team.

| Name | Role |
|---|---|
| (Zimbabwe) Paul Kopolo | Coach |

== Players ==
=== Current squad ===
As of 2 January 2024

==== Men's team ====
| Name | DoB/Age | Ranking of event | | |
| Name | DoB/Age | MS | MD | XD |
|---|---|---|---|---|
| Ashel Dziva | 2 May 1995 (age 31) | 1057 | 525 | – |
| Trinity Chipumho | 14 December 1999 (age 26) | 517 | – | – |
| Thabani Mathe | 15 July 1997 (age 29) | 451 | 525 | 567 |
| Blessing Mahwire | 18 November 2003 (age 22) | 705 | – | – |
| Dean Matyanga | 20 February 1998 (age 28) | – | – | – |

==== Women's team ====
| Name | DoB/Age | Ranking of event | | |
| Name | DoB/Age | WS | WD | XD |
|---|---|---|---|---|
| Fabiana Layla Oliviero | 16 September 1994 (age 32) | 586 | 915 | 567 |
| Avishi Raina | 27 July 2005 (age 21) | 790 | – | – |
| Shalom Sibanda | 31 March 2000 (age 26) | 577 | 915 | – |
| Nyasha Kopolo | 23 November 1999 (age 26) | – | – | – |
| Rumbidzai Ruwende | 20 January 2001 (age 25) | – | – | – |

=== Previous squads ===
==== African Team Championships ====
- Men's team: 2016, 2018, 2022
- Women's team: 2016, 2018, 2022
- Mixed team: 2014, 2017, 2023
