= 1979 WBF World Championships – Men's team =

Badminton event

Men's team at the 1979 WBF World Championships
- Venue: Hangzhou Gymnasium
- Location: Hangzhou, China
- Dates: 10 – 15 June 1979

The men's team tournament at the 1979 WBF World Championships was held from 10 to 15 June 1979 at the Hangzhou Gymnasium in Hangzhou, China. Originally, 16 teams from Asia and Africa competed in the championships.

Zambia withdrew from the tournament, leaving only 15 countries in the men's team tournament.

== Draw ==
The group stage consists of 4 groups, Group 1, Group 2, Group 3 and Group 4. The first-placed teams in each group will advance to the semi-finals while the rest will compete in the classification rounds.

Group 1	Group 2	Group 3	Group 4
China; Philippines; Sri Lanka; Zambia	Ghana; Nigeria; Nepal; Pakistan	Bangladesh; Hong Kong; Kenya; Singapore	Burma; Mauritius; Tanzania; Thailand

== Group stage ==
All times are China Standard Time (UTC+08:00).

=== Group 1 ===
Pos	Team	Pld	W	L	MF	MA	MD	Pts	Qualification
1	China	2	2	0	10	0	+10	2	Semi-finals
2	Sri Lanka	2	1	1	5	5	0	1	Classification round
3	Philippines	2	0	2	0	10	−10	0	Classification round
4	Zambia	0	0	0	0	0	0	0	Withdrew

Source: NewspaperSG

China
5
Hangzhou Gymnasium
10 June 1979

Philippines
0

			1	2	3
1	(China) (Philippines)	Lin Yixiong; Errol Chan	15; 2	15; 1
2	(China) (Philippines)	Luan Jin; Renato Navarro	15; 1	15; 3
3	(China) (Philippines)	Luan Jin / Yu Yaodong; Brandon Chan / Jesus Araneta Martin	15; 1	15; 1
4	(China) (Philippines)	Sun Zhian / Yao Ximing; Errol Chan / Francisco Delgado	15; 4	15; 4
5	(China) (Philippines)	Han Jian; Brandon Chan	15; 2	15; 2

Sri Lanka
-
Hangzhou Gymnasium
10 June 1979

Zambia
Withdrew

		1	2	3
1	(Sri Lanka) (Zambia)
2	(Sri Lanka) (Zambia)
3	(Sri Lanka) (Zambia)
4	(Sri Lanka) (Zambia)
5	(Sri Lanka) (Zambia)

China
5
Hangzhou Gymnasium
11 June 1979

Sri Lanka
0

			1	2	3
1	(China) (Sri Lanka)	Yu Yaodong; Ravi Kuruppu	15; 4	15; 7
2	(China) (Sri Lanka)	Lin Yixiong; Malik Jhan	15; 5	15; 4
3	(China) (Sri Lanka)	Luan Jin / Yu Yaodong; Oliver Guruge / L. G. S. Gunawardena	15; 3	15; 9
4	(China) (Sri Lanka)	Sun Zhian / Yao Ximing; Malik Jhan / Ravi Kuruppu	15; 2	15; 3
5	(China) (Sri Lanka)	Han Jian; L. G. S. Gunawardena	15; 6	15; 1

Philippines
-
Hangzhou Gymnasium
11 June 1979

Zambia
Withdrew

		1	2	3
1	(Philippines) (Zambia)
2	(Philippines) (Zambia)
3	(Philippines) (Zambia)
4	(Philippines) (Zambia)
5	(Philippines) (Zambia)

Sri Lanka
5
Hangzhou Gymnasium
12 June 1979

Philippines
0

			1	2	3
1	(Sri Lanka) (Philippines)	Ravi Kuruppu; Daniel So
2	(Sri Lanka) (Philippines)	Malik Jhan; Errol Chan
3	(Sri Lanka) (Philippines)	Oliver Guruge / L. G. S. Gunawardena; Oscar Cordero / Renato Reyes
4	(Sri Lanka) (Philippines)	Malik Jhan / Ravi Kuruppu; Errol Chan / Daniel So
5	(Sri Lanka) (Philippines)	L. G. S. Gunawardena; Renato Reyes

China
-
Hangzhou Gymnasium
12 June 1979

Zambia
Withdrew

		1	2	3
1	(China) (Zambia)
2	(China) (Zambia)
3	(China) (Zambia)
4	(China) (Zambia)
5	(China) (Zambia)

=== Group 2 ===
Pos	Team	Pld	W	L	MF	MA	MD	Pts	Qualification
1	Pakistan	3	3	0	15	0	+15	3	Semi-finals
2	Nepal	3	2	1	8	7	+1	2	Classification round
3	Nigeria	3	1	2	7	8	−1	1	Classification round
4	Ghana	3	0	3	0	15	−15	0	Classification round

Source: NewspaperSG

Pakistan
5
Hangzhou Gymnasium
10 June 1979

Nigeria
0

			1	2	3
1	(Pakistan) (Nigeria)	Tariq Wadood; Babatunde Badiru
2	(Pakistan) (Nigeria)	Hassan Shaheed; Samson Egbeyemi
3	(Pakistan) (Nigeria)	Javed Iqbal / Tariq Wadood; Monday Edo / Ishola Iyiola
4	(Pakistan) (Nigeria)	Zahid Maqbool / Hassan Shaheed; Babatunde Badiru / Samson Egbeyemi
5	(Pakistan) (Nigeria)	Nadeem Ur-Rahman; Monday Edo

Nepal
5
Hangzhou Gymnasium
10 June 1979

Ghana
0

			1	2	3
1	(Nepal) (Ghana)	Kishor Bahadur Singha; Kodjo Asamoah				w/o
2	(Nepal) (Ghana)	Prem Pandey; Paul Kodjo Kumah				w/o
3	(Nepal) (Ghana)	Pradeep Bikram Shah / Prakash Rana; Mario Appiagyei-Danka / Frank Kwami				w/o
4	(Nepal) (Ghana)	Prem Pandey / Kishor Bahadur Singha; Kodjo Asamoah / Paul Kodjo Kumah				w/o
5	(Nepal) (Ghana)	Prakash Rana; Mario Appiagyei-Danka				w/o

Pakistan
5
Hangzhou Gymnasium
11 June 1979

Nepal
0

			1	2	3
1	(Pakistan) (Nepal)	Tariq Wadood; Prem Pandey	15; 1	15; 2
2	(Pakistan) (Nepal)	Zahid Maqbool; Prakash Rana	15; 3	15; 6
3	(Pakistan) (Nepal)	Javed Iqbal / Tariq Wadood; Pradeep Bikram Shah / Prakash Rana	15; 3	15; 3
4	(Pakistan) (Nepal)	Zahid Maqbool / Hassan Shaheed; Prem Pandey / Kishor Bahadur Singha	15; 5	15; 7
5	(Pakistan) (Nepal)	Javed Iqbal; Kishor Bahadur Singha	15; 12	15; 6

Nigeria
5
Hangzhou Gymnasium
11 June 1979

Ghana
0

			1	2	3
1	(Nigeria) (Ghana)	Samson Egbeyemi; Kodjo Asamoah
2	(Nigeria) (Ghana)	Babatunde Badiru; Paul Kodjo Kumah
3	(Nigeria) (Ghana)	Monday Edo / Ishola Iyiola; Mario Appiagyei-Danka / Frank Kwami
4	(Nigeria) (Ghana)	Babatunde Badiru / Samson Egbeyemi; Kodjo Asamoah / Paul Kodjo Kumah
5	(Nigeria) (Ghana)	Monday Edo; Mario Appiagyei-Danka

Nepal
3
Hangzhou Gymnasium
12 June 1979

Nigeria
2

			1	2	3
1	(Nepal) (Nigeria)	Prem Pandey; Babatunde Badiru
2	(Nepal) (Nigeria)	Prakash Rana; Samson Egbeyemi
3	(Nepal) (Nigeria)	Pradeep Bikram Shah / Prakash Rana; Monday Edo / Ishola Iyiola
4	(Nepal) (Nigeria)	Prem Pandey / Kishor Bahadur Singha; Babatunde Badiru / Samson Egbeyemi
5	(Nepal) (Nigeria)	Kishor Bahadur Singha; Monday Edo

Pakistan
5
Hangzhou Gymnasium
12 June 1979

Ghana
0

			1	2	3
1	(Pakistan) (Ghana)	Tariq Wadood; Kodjo Asamoah
2	(Pakistan) (Ghana)	Hassan Shaheed; Paul Kodjo Kumah
3	(Pakistan) (Ghana)	Javed Iqbal / Tariq Wadood; Mario Appiagyei-Danka / Frank Kwami
4	(Pakistan) (Ghana)	Zahid Maqbool / Hassan Shaheed; Kodjo Asamoah / Paul Kodjo Kumah
5	(Pakistan) (Ghana)	Nadeem Ur-Rahman; Mario Appiagyei-Danka

=== Group 3 ===
Pos	Team	Pld	W	L	MF	MA	MD	Pts	Qualification
1	Hong Kong	3	3	0	13	2	+11	3	Semi-finals
2	Singapore	3	2	1	12	3	+9	2	Classification round
3	Bangladesh	3	1	2	3	12	−9	1	Classification round
4	Kenya	3	0	3	2	13	−11	0	Classification round

Source: NewspaperSG

Singapore
5
Hangzhou Gymnasium
10 June 1979

Kenya
0

			1	2	3
1	(Singapore) (Kenya)	Lee Ah Ngo; Rajesh Shah	15; 7	15; 2
2	(Singapore) (Kenya)	Kamaruddin Musa; Amjid Rasul	15; 1	15; 8
3	(Singapore) (Kenya)	Tan Eng Han / Wong Shoon Keat; Rajesh Shah / Pradesh Sodha	15; 1	15; 5
4	(Singapore) (Kenya)	Chee Mun Hung / Lee Ah Ngo; Indravadan Chauhan / Narendra K. Shah	15; 12	15; 2
5	(Singapore) (Kenya)	Lim Teck Heng; Pradesh Sodha	15; 5	15; 12

Hong Kong
5
Hangzhou Gymnasium
10 June 1979

Bangladesh
0

			1	2	3
1	(Hong Kong) (Bangladesh)	Chan Tin Cheung; Sheikh Abdul Hashem
2	(Hong Kong) (Bangladesh)	Yang Mei Liang; Mohammad Monwarul Alam
3	(Hong Kong) (Bangladesh)	Chan Chi Choi / Wong Man Hing; Sheikh Abdul Hashem / Mansur Ahmed Khan
4	(Hong Kong) (Bangladesh)	Chan Tin Cheung / Yang Mei Liang; Mohammad Monwarul Alam / Mohammed Golam Aziz
5	(Hong Kong) (Bangladesh)	Wong Man Hing; Mohammed Golam Aziz

Hong Kong
5
Hangzhou Gymnasium
11 June 1979

Kenya
0

			1	2	3
1	(Hong Kong) (Kenya)	Chan Tin Cheung; Amjid Rasul	15; 9	15; 5
2	(Hong Kong) (Kenya)	Yang Mei Liang; Moez Alibhai	15; 2	15; 1
3	(Hong Kong) (Kenya)	Chan Chi Choi / Wong Man Hing; Indravadan Chauhan / Narendra K. Shah	15; 5	15; 3
4	(Hong Kong) (Kenya)	Chan Tin Cheung / Yang Mei Liang; Rajesh Shah / Moez Alibhai	15; 7	15; 5
5	(Hong Kong) (Kenya)	Wong Man Hing; Pradesh Sodha	15; 2	15; 2

Singapore
5
Hangzhou Gymnasium
11 June 1979

Bangladesh
0

			1	2	3
1	(Singapore) (Bangladesh)	Wong Shoon Keat; Sheikh Abdul Hashem	15; 1	15; 1
2	(Singapore) (Bangladesh)	Lim Teck Heng; Mohammad Monwarul Alam	15; 6	15; 4
3	(Singapore) (Bangladesh)	Chee Mun Hung / Lee Hai Thong; Sheikh Abdul Hashem / Mansur Ahmed Khan	15; 5	15; 3
4	(Singapore) (Bangladesh)	Tan Eng Han / Wong Shoon Keat; Mohammad Monwarul Alam / Mohammed Golam Aziz	15; 3	15; 4
5	(Singapore) (Bangladesh)	Kamaruddin Musa; Mohammed Golam Aziz	15; 9	15; 2

Hong Kong
3
Hangzhou Gymnasium
12 June 1979

Singapore
2

			1	2	3
1	(Hong Kong) (Singapore)	Chan Tin Cheung; Wong Shoon Keat	15; 2	15; 9
2	(Hong Kong) (Singapore)	Yang Mei Liang; Lee Hai Thong	18; 14	13; 18	10; 15
3	(Hong Kong) (Singapore)	Chan Tin Cheung / Ng Chun Shing; Tan Eng Han / Wong Shoon Keat	15; 9	15; 8
4	(Hong Kong) (Singapore)	Wong Man Hing / Yang Mei Liang; Chee Mun Hung / Lee Hai Thong	5; 15	18; 17	15; 11
5	(Hong Kong) (Singapore)	Wong Man Hing; Kamaruddin Musa	15; 9	4; 15		retired

Bangladesh
3
Hangzhou Gymnasium
12 June 1979

Kenya
2

			1	2	3
1	(Bangladesh) (Kenya)	Mansur Ahmed Khan; S. R. Sinha	15; 8	9; 15	15; 18
2	(Bangladesh) (Kenya)	Mohammed Golam Aziz; Amjid Rasul	10; 15	15; 7	15; 9
3	(Bangladesh) (Kenya)	Mansur Ahmed Khan / Sheikh Abdul Hashem; Rajesh Shah / Pradesh Sodha	18; 14	6; 15	15; 9
4	(Bangladesh) (Kenya)	Mohammad Monwarul Alam / Mohammed Golam Aziz; Indravadan Chauhan / Narendra K. Shah	15; 7	15; 7
5	(Bangladesh) (Kenya)	Mohammad Monwarul Alam; Pradesh Sodha				w/o

=== Group 4 ===
Pos	Team	Pld	W	L	MF	MA	MD	Pts	Qualification
1	Thailand	3	3	0	15	0	+15	3	Semi-finals
2	Burma	3	2	1	10	5	+5	2	Classification round
3	Mauritius	3	1	2	3	12	−9	1	Classification round
4	Tanzania	3	0	3	2	13	−11	0	Classification round

Source: NewspaperSG

Thailand
5
Hangzhou Gymnasium
10 June 1979

Tanzania
0

			1	2	3
1	(Thailand) (Tanzania)	Udom Luangpetcharaporn; Raju Chiplunkar
2	(Thailand) (Tanzania)	Sawei Chanseorasmee; Mukesh Nathwani
3	(Thailand) (Tanzania)	Bandid Jaiyen / Preecha Soparajee; Ali Abed / Fuad Ahmed
4	(Thailand) (Tanzania)	Sawei Chanseorasmee / Sarit Pisudchaikul; Raju Chiplunkar / Mukesh Nathwani
5	(Thailand) (Tanzania)	Bandid Jaiyen; Ali Abed

Burma
5
Hangzhou Gymnasium
10 June 1979

Mauritius
0

			1	2	3
1	(Myanmar) (Mauritius)	Maung Maung; Haroon Dulloo
2	(Myanmar) (Mauritius)	Wai Nyunt; Ravindren Sandrasagren
3	(Myanmar) (Mauritius)	Win Mar / Wai Nyunt; Harvé Hardy / Philippe Lesage
4	(Myanmar) (Mauritius)	Win Htut / Maung Maung; Haroon Dulloo / Ravindren Sandrasagren
5	(Myanmar) (Mauritius)	Win Mar; Harvé Hardy

Burma
5
Hangzhou Gymnasium
11 June 1979

Tanzania
0

			1	2	3
1	(Myanmar) (Tanzania)	Wai Nyunt; Mukesh Nathwani	15; 1	15; 1
2	(Myanmar) (Tanzania)	Maung Maung; Raju Chiplunkar	15; 4	15; 2
3	(Myanmar) (Tanzania)	Win Mar / Wai Nyunt; Ali Abed / Fuad Ahmed	15; 4	15; 7
4	(Myanmar) (Tanzania)	Win Htut / Maung Maung; Raju Chiplunkar / Mukesh Nathwani	15; 7	15; 4
5	(Myanmar) (Tanzania)	Win Mar; Fuad Ahmed	15; 2	15; 1

Thailand
5
Hangzhou Gymnasium
11 June 1979

Mauritius
0

			1	2	3
1	(Thailand) (Mauritius)	Udom Luangpetcharaporn; Ravindren Sandrasagren	15; 2	15; 6
2	(Thailand) (Mauritius)	Sawei Chanseorasmee; Haroon Dulloo	15; 3	15; 1
3	(Thailand) (Mauritius)	Bandid Jaiyen / Preecha Soparajee; Harvé Hardy / Philippe Lesage	15; 3	15; 1
4	(Thailand) (Mauritius)	Sawei Chanseorasmee / Sarit Pisudchaikul; Haroon Dulloo / Ravindren Sandrasagren	15; 2	15; 2
5	(Thailand) (Mauritius)	Sarit Pisudchaikul; Harvé Hardy	15; 3	15; 2

Thailand
5
Hangzhou Gymnasium
12 June 1979

Burma
0

			1	2	3
1	(Thailand) (Myanmar)	Udom Luangpetcharaporn; Wai Nyunt
2	(Thailand) (Myanmar)	Sawei Chanseorasmee; Maung Maung
3	(Thailand) (Myanmar)	Bandid Jaiyen / Preecha Soparajee; Win Mar / Wai Nyunt
4	(Thailand) (Myanmar)	Sawei Chanseorasmee / Sarit Pisudchaikul; Win Htut / Maung Maung
5	(Thailand) (Myanmar)	Bandid Jaiyen; Win Mar

Tanzania
2
Hangzhou Gymnasium
12 June 1979

Mauritius
3

			1	2	3
1	(Tanzania) (Mauritius)	Raju Chiplunkar; Ravindren Sandrasagren
2	(Tanzania) (Mauritius)	Mukesh Nathwani; Haroon Dulloo
3	(Tanzania) (Mauritius)	Ali Abed / Fuad Ahmed; Harvé Hardy / Philippe Lesage
4	(Tanzania) (Mauritius)	Raju Chiplunkar / Mukesh Nathwani; Haroon Dulloo / Ravindren Sandrasagren
5	(Tanzania) (Mauritius)	Fuad Ahmed; Harvé Hardy

== Classification round ==
=== Second-placed teams ===
5th–8th place
14 June
Singapore	3
Burma	2
14 June
Nepal	3
Sri Lanka	2

5th place
15 June
Singapore	5
Nepal	0
7th place
15 June
Burma	5
Sri Lanka	0

=== Third-placed teams ===
9th–12th place
14 June
Philippines	2
Nigeria	3
14 June
Mauritius	1
Bangladesh	4

9th place
15 June
Nigeria	2
Bangladesh	3
11th place
15 June
Philippines	4
Mauritius	1

=== Fourth-placed teams ===
13th–16th place
14 June
Kenya	4
Tanzania	1
14 June
Zambia
Ghana	w/o

13th place
15 June
Kenya	5
Ghana	0
15th place
15 June
Tanzania	w/o
Zambia

== Knockout stage ==
=== Bracket ===
Semi-finals
14 June
China	5
Pakistan	0
14 June
Hong Kong	1
Thailand	4

Final
15 June
China	4
Thailand	1
Third place
15 June
Pakistan	4
Hong Kong	1

=== Semi-finals ===
China
5
Hangzhou Gymnasium
14 June 1979

Pakistan
0

			1	2	3
1	(China) (Pakistan)	Han Jian; Tariq Wadood	15; 6	15; 10
2	(China) (Pakistan)	Luan Jin; Hassan Shaheed	15; 2	15; 3
3	(China) (Pakistan)	Sun Zhian / Yao Ximing; Javed Iqbal / Tariq Wadood	15; 8	15; 6
4	(China) (Pakistan)	Luan Jin / Yu Yaodong; Zahid Maqbool / Hassan Shaheed	15; 10	15; 5
5	(China) (Pakistan)	Lin Yixiong; Javed Iqbal	15; 4	15; 3

Thailand
4
Hangzhou Gymnasium
14 June 1979

Hong Kong
1

			1	2	3
1	(Thailand) (Hong Kong)	Bandid Jaiyen; Wong Man Hing	15; 6	15; 7
2	(Thailand) (Hong Kong)	Udom Luangpetcharaporn; Chan Tin Cheung	15; 13	15; 10
3	(Thailand) (Hong Kong)	Bandid Jaiyen / Preecha Soparajee; Wong Man Hing / Yang Mei Liang	15; 12	15; 9
4	(Thailand) (Hong Kong)	Sawei Chanseorasmee / Sarit Pisudchaikul; Chan Tin Cheung / Ng Chun Shing	15; 13	15; 18	15; 13
5	(Thailand) (Hong Kong)	Sawei Chanseorasmee; Yang Mei Liang				w/o

=== Final ===
China
4
Hangzhou Gymnasium
15 June 1979

Thailand
1

			1	2	3
1	(China) (Thailand)	Yu Yaodong; Sawei Chanseorasmee	15; 7	15; 4
2	(China) (Thailand)	Han Jian; Udom Luangpetcharaporn	15; 5	15; 3
3	(China) (Thailand)	Sun Zhian / Yao Ximing; Bandid Jaiyen / Preecha Soparajee	15; 7	15; 3
4	(China) (Thailand)	Luan Jin / Yu Yaodong; Sawei Chanseorasmee / Sarit Pisudchaikul	12; 15	4; 15
5	(China) (Thailand)	Lin Yixiong; Bandid Jaiyen	15; 8	15; 3

== Final ranking ==
Pos	Team	Pld	W	L	Pts	MD	Final result
1st place, gold medalist(s)	China (H)	4	4	0	4	+18	Champions
2nd place, silver medalist(s)	Thailand	5	4	1	4	+15	Runners-up
3rd place, bronze medalist(s)	Pakistan	5	4	1	4	+13	Third place
4	Hong Kong	5	3	2	3	+5	Fourth place
5	Singapore	5	4	1	4	+15	Fifth place
6	Nepal	5	3	2	3	−3	Sixth place
7	Burma	5	3	2	3	+9	Seventh place
8	Sri Lanka	4	1	3	1	−6	Eighth place
9	Bangladesh	5	3	2	3	−5	Ninth place
10	Nigeria	5	2	3	2	−1	Tenth place
11	Philippines	4	1	3	1	−8	Eleventh place
12	Mauritius	5	1	4	1	−15	Twelfth place
13	Kenya	5	2	3	2	−3	Thirteenth place
14	Ghana	5	1	4	1	−20	Fourteenth place
15	Tanzania	5	1	4	1	−14	Fifteenth place
–	Zambia	–	–	–	–	–	Withdrew
