= Namibia national badminton team =

National badminton team representing Namibia

Namibia
- Association: Badminton Federation of Namibia (BFN)
- Confederation: BCA (Africa)
- President: Lynn du Preez

BWF ranking
- Current ranking: Unranked (2 April 2024)
- Highest ranking: 98 (5 July 2012)

African Mixed Team Championships
- Appearances: 2 (first in 1992)
- Best result: Semi-finals (1994)

The Namibia national badminton team (Afrikaans: Namibië nasionale pluimbalspan; Khoekhoe: Namibiab Republiki dib pluimbal khoen) represents Namibia in international badminton team competitions. It is controlled by the Badminton Federation of Namibia. Namibian badminton players first competed internationally at the 1992 African Badminton Championships.

== History ==
=== Mixed team ===
Namibia competed in the team event at the 1992 African Badminton Championships. The team placed third in their group and failed to advance to the semi-finals. Two years later, the team achieved bronze at the African Championships after losing to Mauritius. The same team that won bronze at the 1994 African Championships later participated in the Commonwealth Games but did not take part in the team events.

In 1998, Namibia achieved second place at the Southern Africa Invitational Badminton Championships in Harare, Zimbabwe.

== Competitive record ==
=== Thomas Cup ===
Year	Round	Pos
1949 to 1990	Part of South Africa	
1992 to 2024	Did not enter	
2026	To be determined	
2028	To be determined	
2030	To be determined	

=== Uber Cup ===
Year	Round	Pos
1957 to 1990	Part of South Africa	
1992 to 2024	Did not enter	
2026	To be determined	
2028	To be determined	
2030	To be determined	

=== Sudirman Cup ===
Year	Round	Pos
1989	Part of South Africa	
1991 to 2023	Did not enter	
2025	To be determined	
2027	To be determined	
2029	To be determined	

=== Commonwealth Games ===
==== Men's team ====
Year	Round	Pos
1998	Did not enter	

==== Women's team ====
Year	Round	Pos
1998	Did not enter	

==== Mixed team ====
Year	Round	Pos
1978 to 1990	Part of South Africa	
1994 to 2022	Did not enter	
2026	To be determined	
2030	To be determined	
2034	To be determined	

=== African Games ===
==== Mixed team ====
Year	Round	Pos
2003 to 2019	Did not enter	
2023	To be determined	

=== African Team Championships ===
==== Men's team ====
Year	Round	Pos
1979 to 1988	Part of South Africa	
2016	Did not enter	
2018	Did not enter	
2020	Did not enter	
2022	Did not enter	
2024	Did not enter	
2026	To be determined	
2028	To be determined	
2030	To be determined	

==== Women's team ====
Year	Round	Pos
1979 to 1988	Part of South Africa	
2016	Did not enter	
2018	Did not enter	
2020	Did not enter	
2022	Did not enter	
2024	Did not enter	
2026	To be determined	
2028	To be determined	
2030	To be determined	

==== Mixed team ====
Year	Round	Pos
1980 to 1988	Part of South Africa	
1992	Group stage	-
1994	Semi-finals	4th
1998	Did not enter	
2000	Did not enter	
2002	Did not enter	
2004	Did not enter	
2006	Did not enter	
2007	Did not enter	
2009	Did not enter	
2011	Did not enter	
2013	Did not enter	
2014	Did not enter	
2017	Did not enter	
2019	Did not enter	
2021	Did not enter	
2023	Did not enter	
2025	To be determined	
2027	To be determined	
2029	To be determined	

**Red border color indicates tournament was held on home soil.

== Junior competitive record ==
=== Suhandinata Cup ===
Year	Round	Pos
2000 to 2024	Did not enter	
2025	To be determined	

=== Commonwealth Youth Games ===
==== Mixed team ====
Year	Round	Pos
2004	Did not enter	

=== African Youth Games ===
==== Men's team ====
Year	Round	Pos
2018	Did not enter	

==== Women's team ====
Year	Round	Pos
2018	Did not enter	

==== Mixed team ====
Year	Round	Pos
2014	Did not enter	

=== African Junior Team Championships ===
==== Mixed team ====
Year	Round	Pos
1979 to 1988	Part of South Africa	
1993 to 2022	Did not enter	
2024	To be determined	

**Red border color indicates tournament was held on home soil.

== Players ==
=== Current squad ===
As of 2 January 2024

==== Men's team ====
Name	DoB/Age	Ranking of event		
Name	DoB/Age	MS	MD	XD
Nino Leicher	4 October 2000 (age 24)	-	-	-
Ronald Smith Neville	10 April 1995 (age 29)	-	-	-
Colbin du Plessis	17 December 1996 (age 28)	-	-	-

==== Women's team ====
Name	DoB/Age	Ranking of event		
Name	DoB/Age	WS	WD	XD
Liza Hanekom	1 January 2001 (age 24)	-	-	-
Gesa Jeske	15 July 1995 (age 29)	-	-	-
Liezl Maritz	26 October 1985 (age 39)	-	-	-
