= Kenya national badminton team =

National badminton team representing Kenya

Kenya
- Association: Badminton Kenya (BK)
- Confederation: BCA (Africa)
- President: Danny Solanki

BWF ranking
- Current ranking: 107 ▲16 (2 April 2024)
- Highest ranking: 65 (3 October 2013)

African Mixed Team Championships
- Appearances: 8 (first in 1980)
- Best result: Runners-up (1980)

African Men's Team Championships
- Appearances: 2 (first in 1979)
- Best result: Champions (1979)

African Women's Team Championships
- Appearances: 2 (first in 1979)
- Best result: Runners-up (1979)

The Kenya national badminton team (Swahili: Timu ya taifa ya Kenya ya badminton) is a badminton team that plays for Kenya in international competitions. It is controlled by Kenya's governing body for the sport, Badminton Kenya. Kenya is one of the first three countries to compete in the inaugural African Badminton Championships in 1979.

== History ==
=== Men's team ===
In 1979, Kenya emerged as champions of the men's team event at the 1979 African Badminton Championships after defeating Tanzania and Ghana. In that same year, Kenya also competed in the men's team event at the 1979 WBF World Championships and were eliminated in the group stages. The team were also runners-up at the 1980 African Badminton Championships in Beira.

From 2008 to 2012, the team took part in qualifying for the Thomas Cup in the African Zone qualifiers but failed to advance beyond the group stages.

=== Women's team ===
Kenya's were runners-up at the 1979 African Badminton Championships women's team event. In 2010, the team reached the quarter-finals of the 2010 Thomas & Uber Cups Preliminaries for Africa but lost 3–0 to Nigeria.

=== Mixed team ===
Kenya were runners-up in the mixed team event at the 1980 African Badminton Championships. In 1982, Kenya competed in the 1982 Commonwealth Games mixed team event. The team fell short and lost to all of their opponents in the Group A tie. In 1998, the team competed in the 1998 African Badminton Championships and finished fourth. In 2003, the team competed in the 2003 African Games team event. The team started their campaign with a 5–0 loss to hosts Nigeria. The team then lost to Seychelles by the same margin.

At the Commonwealth Games of 2006, Kenya's national team participated in the mixed team competition but did not advance further from the group stage. Four years later, the team made their third appearance at the Commonwealth Games mixed team event. The team finished on the bottom of their group. In participating in the 2014 Commonwealth Games, Kenya's national team was ranked the 18th seed for their competition. They finished last place within Pool B.

At the 2019 Sudirman Cup, while Kenya was scheduled to participate, the team unexpectedly withdrew. As part of an effort to improve the country's performance, Kenya sent 290 athletes to the 2019 African Games. As part of this effort, the Kenya national badminton team participated in the badminton events.

== Competitive record ==
=== Thomas Cup ===
Year	Round	Pos
1949 to 1961	Part of the United Kingdom	
1964 to 1988	Did not enter	
1990	Did not qualify	
1992 to 2004	Did not enter	
2006	Did not qualify	
2008	Did not qualify	
2010	Did not qualify	
2012	Did not qualify	
2014	Did not enter	
2016	Did not enter	
2018	Did not enter	
2020	Did not enter	
2022	Did not enter	
2024	Did not enter	
2026	To be determined	
2028	To be determined	
2030	To be determined	

=== Uber Cup ===
Year	Round	Pos
1957 to 1963	Part of the United Kingdom	
1966 to 2008	Did not enter	
2010	Did not qualify	
2012	Did not enter	
2014	Did not enter	
2016	Did not enter	
2018	Did not enter	
2020	Did not enter	
2022	Did not enter	
2024	Did not enter	
2026	To be determined	
2028	To be determined	
2030	To be determined	

=== Sudirman Cup ===
Year	Round	Pos
1989 to 2017	Did not enter	
2019	Withdrew	
2021	Did not enter	
2023	Did not enter	
2025	To be determined	
2027	To be determined	
2029	To be determined	

=== WBF World Championships ===
==== Men's team ====
Year	Round	Pos
1979	Group stage	

==== Women's team ====
Year	Round	Pos
1979	Did not enter	

=== Commonwealth Games ===
==== Men's team ====
Year	Round	Pos
1998	Did not enter	

==== Women's team ====
Year	Round	Pos
1998	Did not enter	

==== Mixed team ====
Year	Round	Pos
1978	Did not enter	
1982	Group stage	
1986	Did not enter	
1990	Did not enter	
1994	Did not enter	
2002	Did not enter	
2006	Group stage	
2010	Group stage	
2014	Group stage	
2018	Did not enter	
2022	Did not enter	
2026	To be determined	

=== African Games ===
==== Mixed team ====
Year	Round	Pos
2003	Group stage	6th
2007	Did not enter	
2011	Group stage	
2015	Group stage	
2019	Quarter-finals	
2027	To be determined	

=== African Team Championships ===
==== Men's team ====
Year	Round	Pos
1979	Champions	1st
1980	Runners-up	2nd
1982	Did not enter	
1984	Did not enter	
1988	Did not enter	
2016	Did not enter	
2018	Did not enter	
2020	Did not enter	
2022	Did not enter	
2024	Did not enter	
2026	To be determined	
2028	To be determined	
2030	To be determined	

==== Women's team ====
Year	Round	Pos
1979	Runners-up	2nd
1980	Fourth place	4th
1982	Did not enter	
1984	Did not enter	
1988	Did not enter	
2016	Did not enter	
2018	Did not enter	
2020	Did not enter	
2022	Did not enter	
2024	Did not enter	
2026	To be determined	
2028	To be determined	
2030	To be determined	

==== Mixed team ====
Year	Round	Pos
1980	Runners-up	2nd
1982	Did not enter	
1984	Did not enter	
1988	Did not enter	
1992	Did not enter	
1994	Did not enter	
1998	Fourth place	4th
2000	Did not enter	
2002	Group stage	
2004	Group stage	
2006	Did not enter	
2007	Group stage	
2009	Group stage	
2011	Did not enter	
2013	Group stage	
2014	Group stage	
2017	Did not enter	
2019	Did not enter	
2021	Did not enter	
2023	Did not enter	
2025	To be determined	
2027	To be determined	
2029	To be determined	

**Red border color indicates tournament was held on home soil.

== Junior competitive record ==
=== Suhandinata Cup ===
Year	Round	Pos
2000	Did not enter	
2002	Group stage	23rd
2004	Did not enter	
2006	Did not enter	
2007	Did not enter	
2008	Did not enter	
2009	Did not enter	
2010	Did not enter	
2011	Did not enter	
2012	Did not enter	
2013	Did not enter	
2014	Did not enter	
2015	Did not enter	
2016	Did not enter	
2017	Did not enter	
2018	Did not enter	
2019	Did not enter	
2022	Did not enter	
2023	Did not enter	
2024	Did not enter	
2025	To be determined	

=== African Youth Games ===
==== Men's team ====
Year	Round	Pos
2018	Did not enter	

==== Women's team ====
Year	Round	Pos
2018	Did not enter	

==== Mixed team ====
Year	Round	Pos
2014	Did not enter	

=== African Junior Team Championships ===
==== Mixed team ====
Year	Round	Pos
1979	Champions	1st
1980	Fifth place	5th
1982	Did not enter	
1984	Did not enter	
1993	Did not enter	
1995	Did not enter	
1997	Did not enter	
1999	Did not enter	
2001	Did not enter	
2003	Did not enter	
2005	Did not enter	
2007	Did not enter	
2009	Did not enter	
2011	Did not enter	
2013	Did not enter	
2016	Did not enter	
2021	Did not enter	
2022	Did not enter	
2024	To be determined	

**Red border color indicates tournament was held on home soil.

== Players ==
=== Current squad ===
As of 2 January 2024

==== Men's team ====
Name	DoB/Age	Ranking of event		
Name	DoB/Age	MS	MD	XD
Sammy Mdogo Sikoyo	22 July 1995 (age 30)	1684	717	-
Edwin Akwanyi	4 August 1995 (age 30)	1245	717	-
Fred Nyaribo Momanyi	24 April 2002 (age 24)	894	-	-

==== Women's team ====
Name	DoB/Age	Ranking of event		
Name	DoB/Age	WS	WD	XD
Saumya Gupta	20 October 2000 (age 25)	302	-	-
Maryann Makon'go	25 February 1988 (age 38)	726	-	-
Kivisi Andia	29 September 1994 (age 31)	-	-	-

== See also ==
- Kenya International
- Kenya Badminton Association
