= African Badminton Championships =

Badminton championships

- Current season, competition or edition: 2026 African Badminton Championships
- Sport: Badminton
- Founded: 1979; 47 years ago
- Most recent champion: Algeria
- Website: badmintonafrica.com

The African Badminton Championships is a tournament organized by the Badminton Confederation of Africa (BCA) to crown the best badminton players in Africa. For the team event there is the African Badminton Cup of Nations. This is not to be confused with the All African Games, the multi sports event, held every four years where badminton is included since 2003.

This tournament started in 1979 where Kumasi, Ghana held the competition. Kenya emerged as the men's team champions while Tanzania clinched the women's team title at the first edition. The tournament was held biennially from 1980 to 2006. The 1986 edition of the championships, which was supposed to be held in Lusaka was postponed and later cancelled. Nigeria continued to host the tournament two years later.

== Location of the African Badminton Championships ==
The table below gives an overview of all host cities and countries of the African Badminton Championships. The most recent games were held in Benoni in 2023. The number in parentheses following the city/country denotes how many times that city/country has hosted the championships.

Host cities of the African Badminton Championships

Number	Year	Host city	Events
1	1979	Kumasi, Ghana (1)	3
2	1980	Beira, Mozambique (1)	4
3	1982	Lagos, Nigeria (1)	4
4	1984	Dar es Salaam, Tanzania (1)	9
5	1988	Lagos, Nigeria (2)	9
6	1992	Port Louis, Mauritius (1)	6
7	1994	Rose Hill, Mauritius (1)	6
8	1996	Lagos, Nigeria (3)	5
9	1998	Rose Hill, Mauritius (2)	6
10	2000	Bauchi, Nigeria (1)	6
11	2002	Casablanca, Morocco (1)	6
12	2004	Rose Hill, Mauritius (3)	6
13	2006	Algiers, Algeria (1)	6
14	2007	Rose Hill, Mauritius (4)	6
15	2009	Nairobi, Kenya (1)	6

Number	Year	Host city	Events
16	2010	Kampala, Uganda (1)	5
17	2011	Marrakesh, Morocco (1)	6
18	2012	Addis Ababa, Ethiopia (1)	5
19	2013	Rose Hill, Mauritius (5)	6
20	2014	Gaborone, Botswana (1)	6
21	2017	Benoni, South Africa (1)	6
22	2018	Algiers, Algeria (2)	5
23	2019	Port Harcourt, Nigeria (1)	6
24	2020	Cairo, Egypt (1)	5
25	2021	Kampala, Uganda (2)	6
26	2022	Kampala, Uganda (3)	5
27	2023	Benoni, South Africa (2)	6
28	2024	Cairo, Egypt (2)	5
29	2025	Douala, Cameroon (1)	6
30	2026	Gaborone, Botswana (2)	5

== All-time medal table ==
As of the 2026 edition

Rank	Nation	Gold	Silver	Bronze	Total
1	South Africa	56	39	49	144
2	Nigeria	44	48.5	66	158.5
3	Algeria	24	9	16.5	49.5
4	Mauritius	17	22.5	61	100.5
5	Egypt	10	17	38	65
6	Seychelles	8	5	16	29
7	Mozambique	6	0	7.5	13.5
8	Tanzania	3	13	13	29
9	Uganda	2	3	19	24
10	Kenya	2	3	1	6
11	Zambia	1	9	13	23
12	Zimbabwe	1	0	0	1
13	Ghana	0	2	6	8
14	Réunion	0	1	3	4
15	Namibia	0	0	5.5	5.5
16	Morocco	0	0	1.5	1.5
17	Botswana	0	0	1	1
17	Madagascar	0	0	1	1
Totals (18 entries)		174	172	318	664

In November 2019, Badminton World Federation released a statement regarding doping test failure of Kate Foo Kune in this championships and decided to disqualify her result in 2019 African Badminton Championships.

== Previous winners ==
Year	Men's singles	Women's singles	Men's doubles	Women's doubles	Mixed doubles
1979	Not held				
1980	Not held				
1982	Not held				
1984	(Zambia) Simon Gondwe	(Mozambique) Indira Bhikha	(Tanzania) Firoz Din (Tanzania) Mukesh Shah	(Mozambique) Indira Bhikha (Mozambique) Eline Coelho	(Mozambique) Sozinho Guerra (Mozambique) Indira Bhikha
1988	(Nigeria) Tamuno Gibson	(Nigeria) Oby Edoga	(Nigeria) Tamuno Gibson (Nigeria) Fatai Tokosi	(Nigeria) Oby Edoga (Nigeria) Dayo Oyewusi	(Nigeria) Tamuno Gibson (Nigeria) Oby Edoga
1992	(Mauritius) Eddy Clarisse	(South Africa) Lina Fourie	(South Africa) Anton Kriel (South Africa) Nico Meerholz	(South Africa) Augusta Phillips (South Africa) Tracey Thompson	(South Africa) Anton Kriel (South Africa) Lina Fourie
1994	(Mauritius) Eddy Clarisse	(South Africa) Lina Fourie	(South Africa) Nico Meerholz (South Africa) Alan Phillips	(South Africa) Lina Fourie (South Africa) Tracey Thompson	(South Africa) Alan Phillips (South Africa) Augusta Phillips
1996	(Nigeria) Agarawu Tunde	(Nigeria) Obiageli Olorunsola	(Nigeria) Danjuma Fatauchi (Nigeria) Agarawu Tunde	(Nigeria) Obiageli Olorunsola (Nigeria) Olamide Toyin Adebayo	(Nigeria) Kayode Akinsanya (Nigeria) Obiageli Olorunsola
1998	(Mauritius) Eddy Clarisse	(South Africa) Lina Fourie	(South Africa) Johan Kleingeld (South Africa) Anton Kriel	(South Africa) Lina Fourie (South Africa) Monique Ric-Hansen	(South Africa) Anton Kriel (South Africa) Michelle Edwards
2000	(Mauritius) Denis Constantin	(Mauritius) Amrita Sawaram	(Mauritius) Denis Constantin (Mauritius) Eddy Clarisse	(Nigeria) Grace Daniel (Nigeria) Miriam Sude	(Nigeria) Abimbola Odejoke (Nigeria) Bridget Ibenero
2002	(Nigeria) Abimbola Odejoke	(Seychelles) Juliette Ah-Wan	(Mauritius) Denis Constantin (Mauritius) Stéphane Beeharry	(South Africa) Michelle Edwards (South Africa) Chantal Botts	(South Africa) Chris Dedman (South Africa) Antoinette Uys
2004	(Nigeria) Dotun Akinsaya	(South Africa) Michelle Edwards	(South Africa) Johan Kleingeld (South Africa) Chris Dednam	(South Africa) Michelle Edwards (South Africa) Chantal Botts	(Nigeria) Greg Okuonghae (Nigeria) Grace Daniel
2006	(Algeria) Nabil Lasmari	(Seychelles) Juliette Ah-Wan	(South Africa) Roelof Dednam (South Africa) Chris Dednam	(South Africa) Michelle Edwards (South Africa) Stacey Doubell	(Seychelles) Georgie Cupidon (Seychelles) Juliette Ah-Wan
2007	(Algeria) Nabil Lasmari	(Nigeria) Grace Daniel	(South Africa) Roelof Dednam (South Africa) Chris Dednam	(South Africa) Michelle Edwards (South Africa) Chantal Botts	(Seychelles) Georgie Cupidon (Seychelles) Juliette Ah-Wan
2008	Cancelled				
2009	(Nigeria) Ola Fagbemi	(Seychelles) Juliette Ah-Wan	(Nigeria) Jinkan Ifraimu (Nigeria) Ola Fagbemi	(Nigeria) Grace Daniel (Nigeria) Mary Gideon	(Nigeria) Ola Fagbemi (Nigeria) Grace Daniel
2010	(Nigeria) Jinkan Ifraimu	(Egypt) Hadia Hosny	(Nigeria) Jinkan Ifraimu (Nigeria) Ola Fagbemi	(South Africa) Michelle Edwards (South Africa) Annari Viljoen	(South Africa) Dorian Lance James (South Africa) Michelle Edwards
2011	(Nigeria) Jinkan Ifraimu	(South Africa) Stacey Doubell	(South Africa) Dorian Lance James (South Africa) Willem Viljoen	(South Africa) Michelle Edwards (South Africa) Annari Viljoen	(South Africa) Willem Viljoen (South Africa) Annari Viljoen
2012	(South Africa) Jacob Maliekal	(Nigeria) Grace Gabriel	(South Africa) Dorian Lance James (South Africa) Willem Viljoen	(South Africa) Michelle Edwards (South Africa) Annari Viljoen	(South Africa) Dorian Lance James (South Africa) Michelle Edwards
2013	(South Africa) Jacob Maliekal	(Nigeria) Grace Gabriel	(South Africa) Andries Malan (South Africa) Willem Viljoen	(Seychelles) Juliette Ah-Wan (Seychelles) Allisen Camille	(South Africa) Willem Viljoen (South Africa) Michelle Butler-Emmett
2014	(South Africa) Jacob Maliekal	(Mauritius) Kate Foo Kune	(South Africa) Andries Malan (South Africa) Willem Viljoen	(Mauritius) Kate Foo Kune (Mauritius) Yeldy Louison	(South Africa) Willem Viljoen (South Africa) Michelle Butler-Emmett
2017	(Algeria) Adel Hamek	(Mauritius) Kate Foo Kune	(Algeria) Koceila Mammeri (Algeria) Youcef Sabri Medel	(South Africa) Michelle Butler-Emmett (South Africa) Jennifer Fry	(South Africa) Andries Malan (South Africa) Jennifer Fry
2018	(Mauritius) Julien Paul	(Mauritius) Kate Foo Kune	(Algeria) Mohamed Abderrahime Belarbi (Algeria) Adel Hamek	(Seychelles) Juliette Ah-Wan (Seychelles) Allisen Camille	(Algeria) Koceila Mammeri (Algeria) Linda Mazri
2019	(Nigeria) Anuoluwapo Juwon Opeyori	(Nigeria) Dorcas Ajoke Adesokan	(Algeria) Koceila Mammeri (Algeria) Youcef Sabri Medel	(Nigeria) Dorcas Ajoke Adesokan (Nigeria) Deborah Ukeh	(Algeria) Koceila Mammeri (Algeria) Linda Mazri
2020	(Mauritius) Julien Paul	(Mauritius) Kate Foo Kune	(Algeria) Koceila Mammeri (Algeria) Youcef Sabri Medel	(Egypt) Doha Hany (Egypt) Hadia Hosny	(Egypt) Adham Hatem Elgamal (Egypt) Doha Hany
2021	(Egypt) Adham Hatem Elgamal	(South Africa) Johanita Scholtz	(Algeria) Koceila Mammeri (Algeria) Youcef Sabri Medel	(South Africa) Amy Ackerman (South Africa) Johanita Scholtz	(Algeria) Koceila Mammeri (Algeria) Tanina Mammeri
2022	(Nigeria) Anuoluwapo Juwon Opeyori	(Egypt) Nour Ahmed Youssri	(Algeria) Koceila Mammeri (Algeria) Youcef Sabri Medel	(Mauritius) Lorna Bodha (Mauritius) Kobita Dookhee	(Algeria) Koceila Mammeri (Algeria) Tanina Mammeri
2023	(Nigeria) Anuoluwapo Juwon Opeyori	(Uganda) Fadilah Mohamed Rafi	(South Africa) Jarred Elliott (South Africa) Robert Summers	(South Africa) Amy Ackerman (South Africa) Deidré Laurens	(Algeria) Koceila Mammeri (Algeria) Tanina Mammeri
2024	(Nigeria) Anuoluwapo Juwon Opeyori	(Mauritius) Kate Ludik	(Algeria) Koceila Mammeri (Algeria) Youcef Sabri Medel	(South Africa) Amy Ackerman (South Africa) Deidré Laurens	(Algeria) Koceila Mammeri (Algeria) Tanina Mammeri
2025	(Nigeria) Anuoluwapo Juwon Opeyori	(Egypt) Nour Ahmed Youssri	(Algeria) Koceila Mammeri (Algeria) Youcef Sabri Medel	(South Africa) Amy Ackerman (South Africa) Johanita Scholtz	(Algeria) Koceila Mammeri (Algeria) Tanina Mammeri
2026	(Egypt) Adham Hatem Elgamal	(Uganda) Fadilah Mohamed Rafi	(Algeria) Koceila Mammeri (Algeria) Youcef Sabri Medel	(South Africa) Amy Ackerman (South Africa) Johanita Scholtz	(Algeria) Koceila Mammeri (Algeria) Tanina Mammeri

== Team event ==
=== Men's and women's team (1979–1989) ===
==== Men's team ====
Ed.	Year	Hosts	Final			Third place playoff or losing semi-finalists			Number of teams
Ed.	Year	Hosts	Champions	Score	Runners-up	Third place	Score	Fourth place	Number of teams
1	1979	Ghana	Kenya	round-robin	Tanzania	Ghana	round-robin	–	3
2	1980	Mozambique	Nigeria	round-robin	Kenya	Tanzania	round-robin	Mozambique	5
3	1982	Nigeria	Nigeria	round-robin	Zambia	Ghana	round-robin	Mozambique	4
4	1984	Tanzania	Tanzania	round-robin	Zambia	Mozambique	round-robin	–	3
5	1988	Nigeria	Nigeria	round-robin	Tanzania	Mauritius	round-robin	–	3

==== Women's team ====
Ed.	Year	Hosts	Final			Third place playoff or losing semi-finalists			Number of teams
Ed.	Year	Hosts	Champions	Score	Runners-up	Third place	Score	Fourth place	Number of teams
1	1979	Ghana	Tanzania	round-robin	Kenya	Ghana	round-robin	–	3
2	1980	Mozambique	Zimbabwe	round-robin	Nigeria	Tanzania	round-robin	Kenya	5
3	1982	Nigeria	Nigeria	round-robin	Ghana	Mozambique	round-robin	Zambia	4
4	1984	Tanzania	Mozambique	round-robin	Tanzania	Zambia	round-robin	–	3
5	1988	Nigeria	Nigeria	round-robin	Tanzania	Mauritius	round-robin	–	3

=== Mixed team ===
Ed.	Year	Hosts	Final			Third place playoff or losing semi-finalists			Number of teams
Ed.	Year	Hosts	Champions	Score	Runners-up	Third place	Score	Fourth place	Number of teams
1	1980	Mozambique	Nigeria	round-robin	Kenya	Tanzania	round-robin	Mozambique	5
2	1982	Nigeria	Nigeria	round-robin	Ghana	Mozambique	round-robin	–	3
3	1984	Tanzania	Mozambique	round-robin	Tanzania	Zambia	round-robin	–	3
4	1988	Nigeria	Nigeria	round-robin	Tanzania	Mauritius	round-robin	–	3
5	1992	Mauritius	South Africa	w/o	Nigeria	Mauritius and Tanzania			8
6	1994	South Africa	South Africa	3–2	Mauritius	Namibia and Nigeria			6
7	1998	Mauritius	South Africa	3–2	Mauritius	Madagascar	3–2	Kenya	6
8	2000	Nigeria	Mauritius	3–2	Nigeria	South Africa	3–0	Seychelles	6
9	2002	Morocco	South Africa	3–0	Nigeria	Mauritius	3–0	Seychelles	8
10	2004	Mauritius	South Africa	3–1	Nigeria	Mauritius and Seychelles			12
11	2006	Algeria	South Africa	3–0	Algeria	Mauritius and Seychelles			13
12	2007	Mauritius	Seychelles	3–2	South Africa	Mauritius and Zambia			8
13	2009	Kenya	South Africa	3–1	Seychelles	Egypt and Mauritius			9
14	2011	Morocco	South Africa	3–2	Nigeria	Egypt and Mauritius			9
15	2013	Mauritius	South Africa	3–0	Nigeria	Mauritius and Seychelles			10
16	2014	Botswana	South Africa	3–1	Nigeria	Mauritius and Seychelles			10
17	2017	South Africa	Egypt	3–1	South Africa	Nigeria and Zambia			9
18	2019	Nigeria	Nigeria	3–2	Mauritius	Egypt and Ghana			13
19	2021	Uganda	Egypt	3–1	Algeria	South Africa and Uganda			8
20	2023	South Africa	Egypt	3–2	Mauritius	Algeria and South Africa			13
21	2025	Cameroon	Algeria	3–1	Mauritius	Egypt and South Africa			11

=== Junior mixed team (U19) (1979–1989) ===
Ed.	Year	Hosts	Final			Third place playoff or losing semi-finalists			Number of teams
Ed.	Year	Hosts	Champions	Score	Runners-up	Third place	Score	Fourth place	Number of teams
1	1979	Ghana	Kenya	round-robin	Tanzania	Ghana	round-robin	–	3
2	1980	Mozambique	Nigeria	round-robin	Zambia	Mozambique	round-robin	Tanzania	4
3	1982	Nigeria	Nigeria	round-robin	Zambia	Mozambique	round-robin	Ghana	4
4	1984	Tanzania	Mozambique	round-robin	Tanzania	Zambia	round-robin	–	3
5	1988	Nigeria	Nigeria	round-robin	Tanzania	Mauritius	round-robin	–	3

== See also ==
- All Africa Men's and Women's Team Badminton Championships, another continental tournament
- African Junior Badminton Championships
