= Ghana national badminton team =

National badminton team representing Ghana

Ghana
- Association: Ghana Badminton (GB)
- Confederation: BCA (Africa)
- President: Yeboah Evans

BWF ranking
- Current ranking: 91 ▲15 (2 April 2024)
- Highest ranking: 52 (6 October 2016)

African Mixed Team Championships
- Appearances: 7 (first in 1982)
- Best result: Runners-up (1982)

African Men's Team Championships
- Appearances: 4 (first in 1982)
- Best result: Semi-finals (1979, 1982, 2016, 2018)

African Women's Team Championships
- Appearances: 4 (first in 1982)
- Best result: Runners-up (1982)

The Ghana national badminton team (Akan: Gaana ɔman badminton kuw no) represents Ghana in international badminton team competitions. Ghana Badminton is the national governing body of the sport representing every member of the badminton community in Ghana.

Ghana is one of the seven founding members of the Badminton Confederation of Africa. Ghana was also the host and one of the first three participating countries in the inaugural African Badminton Championships in 1979. The team also competed in the 1979 WBF World Championships sanctioned by the now-defunct World Badminton Federation which merged with the International Badminton Federation in 1981.

== History ==
=== Men's team ===
In April 1979, Ghana hosted the 1979 African Badminton Championships and finished in third place behind Tanzania and Kenya in the men's team event. In June 1979, the team competed in the 1979 WBF World Championships in Hangzhou, China. The team were drawn into Group 2 with Pakistan, Nepal and Nigeria. The team conceded a walkover to Nigeria and Nepal in their first two matches due to not arriving to the venue in time. In their last match, they lost 5–0 to Pakistan. In 1982, the men's team finished in third place at the 1982 African Badminton Championships.

In 2010, the men's team took part in the 2010 Thomas Cup African Qualifiers. The team earned a place in the quarter-finals after defeating Burundi in the group stage. In the quarter-finals, they lost 3–2 to Egypt. In 2016, the men's team won bronze when they entered the semi-finals of the 2016 Africa Men's Team Championships but lost to Egypt 3–0. In the 2018 African Men's Team Championships, the team defeated Egypt 3–2 in the quarter-finals but lost 3–1 to Nigeria.

=== Women's team ===
In the 1979 African Badminton Championships, Ghana won bronze in the women's team event. In the 1982 African Badminton Championships, the team finished in second place behind Nigeria in the women's team event. In 2010, the women's team failed to qualify for the Uber Cup after being eliminated in the group stages of the 2010 Uber Cup African Qualifiers.

In 2016, the team were semi-finalists at the 2016 Africa Women's Team Championships. In the 2018 African Women's Team Championships, the team were eliminated in the group stages.

=== Mixed team ===
Ghana won a silver medal in the mixed team event at the 1982 African Badminton Championships. The team also competed in the African Championships in 1992 and 1994 but did not make it past the group stage. The team then competed in the championships again in 2006, 2009 and 2013 but did not advance to the knockout stage.

In 2014, Ghana made their debut in the Commonwealth Games mixed team event. The team were drawn into Pool B with India, Uganda and Kenya. The team started off with a 5–0 loss to India. The team later rebounded and defeated Kenya 3–2. In their last match, they defeated Uganda 3–2 to finish second in their group. The team made their second appearance at the Commonwealth Games in 2018 and could not get past the group stage after losing to Malaysia and Canada in their group.

In the 2019 African Mixed Team Championships, the team caused an upset when they defeated South Africa 3–2 in the quarter-finals. The team could not advance further after losing 3–0 to hosts Nigeria in the semi-finals and had to settle for bronze. In the 2021 African Mixed Team Championships, the team withdrew from the tournament. In 2024, the team planned to compete in the team event at the 2023 African Games which was later cancelled.

== Competitive record ==
=== Thomas Cup ===
Year	Round	Pos
1949 to 1955	Part of the United Kingdom	
1958 to 2008	Did not enter	
2010	Did not qualify	
2012	Did not enter	
2014	Did not enter	
2016	Did not qualify	
2018	Did not qualify	
2020	Did not enter	
2022	Did not enter	
2024	Did not enter	
2026	Did not qualify	
2028	To be determined	
2030	To be determined	

=== Uber Cup ===
Year	Round	Pos
1957 to 2008	Did not enter	
2010	Did not qualify	
2012	Did not enter	
2014	Did not enter	
2016	Did not qualify	
2018	Did not qualify	
2020	Did not enter	
2022	Did not enter	
2024	Did not enter	
2026	Did not enter	
2028	To be determined	
2030	To be determined	

=== Sudirman Cup ===
Year	Round	Pos
1989 to 2023	Did not enter	
2025	Did not qualify	
2027	To be determined	
2029	To be determined	

=== WBF World Championships ===
==== Men's team ====
Year	Round	Pos
1979	Group stage	

==== Women's team ====
Year	Round	Pos
1979	Did not enter	

=== Commonwealth Games ===
==== Men's team ====
Year	Round	Pos
1998	Group stage	

==== Women's team ====
Year	Round	Pos
1998	Did not enter	

==== Mixed team ====
Year	Round	Pos
1978 to 2010	Did not enter	
2014	Group stage	
2018	Group stage	
2022	Did not enter	
2026	To be determined	
2030	To be determined	
2034	To be determined	

=== African Games ===
==== Mixed team ====
Year	Round	Pos
2003	Did not enter	
2007	Group stage	8th
2011	Group stage	
2015	Quarter-finals	
2019	Did not enter	
2027	To be determined	

=== African Team Championships ===
==== Men's team ====
Year	Round	Pos
1979	Third place	3rd
1980	Did not enter	
1982	Third place	3rd
1984	Did not enter	
1988	Did not enter	
2016	Semi-finals	4th
2018	Semi-finals	4th
2020	Did not enter	
2022	Did not enter	
2024	Did not enter	
2026	Quarter-finals	8th
2028	To be determined	
2030	To be determined	

==== Women's team ====
Year	Round	Pos
1979	Third place	3rd
1980	Did not enter	
1982	Runners-up	2nd
1984	Did not enter	
1988	Did not enter	
2016	Semi-finals	4th
2018	Group stage	
2020	Did not enter	
2022	Did not enter	
2024	Did not enter	
2026	Did not enter	
2028	To be determined	
2030	To be determined	

==== Mixed team ====
Year	Round	Pos
1980	Did not enter	
1982	Runners-up	2nd
1984	Did not enter	
1988	Did not enter	
1992	Group stage	
1994	Group stage	
1998	Did not enter	
2000	Did not enter	
2002	Did not enter	
2004	Did not enter	
2006	Group stage	10th
2007	Did not enter	
2009	Group stage	
2011	Did not enter	
2013	Group stage	
2014	Did not enter	
2017	Did not enter	
2019	Semi-finals	4th
2021	Withdrew	
2023	Did not enter	
2025	Withdrew	
2027	To be determined	
2029	To be determined	

**Red border color indicates tournament was held on home soil.

== Junior competitive record ==
=== Suhandinata Cup ===
Year	Round	Pos
(China) 2000	Did not enter	
(South Africa) 2002	Did not enter	
(Canada) 2004	Did not enter	
(South Korea) 2006	Did not enter	
(New Zealand) 2007	Did not enter	
(India) 2008	Did not enter	
(Malaysia) 2009	Did not enter	
(Mexico) 2010	Did not enter	
(Taiwan) 2011	Did not enter	
(Japan) 2012	Did not enter	
(Thailand) 2013	Did not enter	
(Malaysia) 2014	Did not enter	
(Peru) 2015	Did not enter	
(Spain) 2016	Withdrew	
(Indonesia) 2017	Group stage	36th of 44
(Canada) 2018	Did not enter	
(Russia) 2019	Did not enter	
(New Zealand) 2020	Cancelled because of COVID-19 pandemic	
(China) 2021	Cancelled because of COVID-19 pandemic	
(Spain) 2022	Did not enter	
(United States) 2023	Group stage	34th of 38
(China) 2024	Withdrew	
(India) 2025	Group stage	32nd of 36
(Egypt) 2026	Group stage	41st of 47

=== African Youth Games ===
==== Men's team ====
Year	Round	Pos
2018	Did not enter	

==== Women's team ====
Year	Round	Pos
2018	Did not enter	

==== Mixed team ====
Year	Round	Pos
2014	Group stage	

=== African Junior Team Championships ===
==== Mixed team ====
Year	Round	Pos
1979	Third place	3rd
1980	Did not enter	
1982	Fourth place	4th
1984	Did not enter	
1993	Did not enter	
1995	Did not enter	
1997	Did not enter	
1999	Did not enter	
2001	Did not enter	
2003	Did not enter	
2005	Group stage	
2007	Did not enter	
2009	Semi-finals	3rd
2011	Did not enter	
2013	Group stage	
2016	Did not enter	
2021	Group stage	5th
2022	Did not enter	
2024	Did not enter	
2026	Semi-finals	3rd

**Red border color indicates tournament was held on home soil.

== Players ==
=== Current squad ===
As of 2 January 2024

==== Men's team ====
Name	DoB/Age	Ranking of event		
Name	DoB/Age	MS	MD	XD
Kelvin Evans Alphous	1 April 2002 (age 24)	1057	534	426
Ahmad Abdul-Samad	12 March 2001 (age 25)	1339	534	-
Leslie Nii Addo	23 October 2006 (age 19)	1339	-	567
Ebenezer Korampong	26 February 2005 (age 21)	-	-	-
Michael Botwe	9 June 2006 (age 20)	-	-	-
Elvis Osei	4 June 2005 (age 21)	-	-	-

==== Women's team ====
Name	DoB/Age	Ranking of event		
Name	DoB/Age	WS	WD	XD
Cindy Tornyenyor	25 March 2005 (age 21)	1035	457	567
Prospera Nantuo	25 November 2003 (age 22)	1035	457	426
Rabiatu Ofoli	23 July 1995 (age 31)	1035	-	567
Regina Asiebeka	16 February 2003 (age 23)	-	-	-
Gloria Nyame	25 August 2005 (age 21)	-	-	-
Rachel Quarcoo	24 February 2009 (age 17)	-	-	-
