= Zambia national badminton team =

National badminton team representing Zambia

Zambia
- Association: Zambia Badminton Association (ZBA)
- Confederation: BCA (Africa)
- President: Kingsley Mulenga

BWF ranking
- Current ranking: 61 (2 April 2024)
- Highest ranking: 49 (6 July 2017)

African Mixed Team Championships
- Appearances: 12 (first in 1980)
- Best result: Third place (1984, 2007, 2017)

African Men's Team Championships
- Appearances: 5 (first in 1980)
- Best result: Runners-up (1982)

African Women's Team Championships
- Appearances: 2 (first in 1980)
- Best result: Third place (1984)

The Zambia national badminton team represents Zambia in international badminton team competitions. The team is controlled by the Zambia Badminton Association.

The Zambian team won two runner-up places in the 1982 African Badminton Championships. Their most recent achievement was in 2017 African Badminton Championships where the mixed team got into the semi-finals for bronze. The team participated in the 2022 Commonwealth Games.

Zambia made its badminton debut in the Olympics when Eli Mambwe participated in the 2008 Summer Olympics men singles event in Beijing, China.

== History ==
British soldiers introduced badminton to Zambia in the 1940s, when the nation was still a British protectorate. In 1947, the Northern Rhodesia Badminton Association was formed and became part of the International Badminton Federation in 1948.

After Zambia's independence in 1964, the national team became part of the Badminton Confederation of Africa in the 1970s. At the time, the national team hosted its first national championships.

=== Men's team ===
The Zambian men's team first competed internationally in the 1982 African Badminton Championships men's team event and finished as runners-up. In 1984, the men's team took part in qualifying for the 1984 Thomas Cup but failed as the team lost 5–0 to Denmark and Ireland in the group stages. In the qualifiers for the 1986 Thomas Cup, Zambia lost all their matches against Sweden, Austria, Iceland and France.

The Zambian team had better results in the 1998 Thomas Cup qualifiers. Although the team lost all their matches to Portugal and Italy, they were able to win a match against Kazakhstan and prevailed against the Georgian team after winning 4–1 in the final match.

The men's team then competed in the 2006 Thomas & Uber Cups Preliminaries for Africa which serves as qualification for the Thomas Cup. The men's team reached the semi-finals but lost to South Africa.

In 2022, the men's team competed in the 2022 All Africa Men's and Team Badminton Championships. The team beat Zimbabwe to finish second in Group A and advanced to the quarter-finals. They then lost 3–1 against South Africa at the quarter-final stage.

=== Women's team ===
The Zambian women's team finished in fourth place at the 1982 African Badminton Championships women's team event. The team tried to qualify for the 1986 Uber Cup but lost all their matches in their group.

=== Mixed team ===
The Zambian mixed team first competed in the 1982 African Badminton Championships. The team finished as runners-up after losing to Nigeria in the final.

Zambia then competed in the 2017 African Badminton Championships. The Zambian team finished as group runner-up and advanced to the semi-finals for a guaranteed bronze medal. The team lost 3–0 to rivals South Africa in the semi-finals. In 2018, the Zambian team debuted in the Commonwealth Games mixed team event. The team finished on the bottom of their group after losing to Mauritius, Jamaica and Singapore.

In 2022, the team made their second appearance at the Commonwealth Games. The team lost 5–0 to Malaysia. The Mulenga brothers have been saviors for the Zambian team as they were able to win a match against Jarred Elliott and Robert Summers of South Africa. Zambia ended their 2022 Commonwealth Games campaign after losing 4–1 against Jamaica.

== Competitive record ==
=== Thomas Cup ===
Year	Round	Pos
1949	Did not enter	
1952	Did not enter	
1955	Did not enter	
1958	Did not enter	
1961	Did not enter	
1964	Did not enter	
1967	Did not enter	
1970	Did not enter	
1973	Did not enter	
1976	Did not enter	
1979	Did not enter	
1982	Did not enter	
1984	Did not qualify	
1986	Did not qualify	
1988	Did not enter	
1990	Withdrew	
1992	Did not enter	
1994	Did not enter	
1996	Did not enter	
1998	Did not qualify	
2000	Did not qualify	
2002	Did not enter	
2004	Did not qualify	
2006	Did not qualify	
2008	Did not qualify	
2010	Did not qualify	
2012	Did not enter	
2014	Did not qualify	
2016	Did not enter	
2018	Did not qualify	
2020	Did not enter	
2022	Did not qualify	
2024	Did not qualify	
2026	Did not qualify	
2028	To be determined	
2030	To be determined	

=== Uber Cup ===
Year	Round	Pos
1957 to 1984	Did not enter	
1986	Did not qualify	
1988	Did not enter	
1990	Did not qualify	
1992	Did not enter	
1994	Did not enter	
1996	Did not enter	
1998	Did not enter	
2000	Did not enter	
2002	Did not enter	
2004	Did not enter	
2006	Did not qualify	
2008	Did not enter	
2010	Did not enter	
2012	Did not enter	
2014	Did not qualify	
2016	Did not enter	
2018	Did not enter	
2020	Did not enter	
2022	Did not enter	
2024	Did not enter	
2026	Did not qualify	
2028	To be determined	
2030	To be determined	

=== Sudirman Cup ===
Year	Round	Pos
1989 to 2019	Did not enter	
2021	Did not qualify	
2023	Did not qualify	
2025	Did not qualify	
2027	To be determined	
2029	To be determined	

=== Commonwealth Games ===
==== Men's team ====
Year	Round	Pos
1998	Did not enter	

==== Women's team ====
Year	Round	Pos
1998	Did not enter	

==== Mixed team ====
Year	Round	Pos
1978 to 2014	Did not enter	
2018	Group stage	13th
2022	Group stage	14th
2026	To be determined	

=== African Games ===
==== Mixed team ====
Year	Round	Pos
2003	Did not enter	
2007	Did not enter	
2011	Did not enter	
2015	Did not enter	
2019	Quarter-finals	6th
2027	To be determined	

=== African Team Championships ===
==== Men's team ====
Year	Round	Pos
1979	Withdrew (Note: The Zambian senior and junior teams were late to compete in the championships after they reached the wrong venue and therefore withdrew from the competition.)	
1980	Did not enter	
1982	Runners-up	2nd
1984	Runners-up	2nd
1988	Did not enter	
2016	Did not enter	
2018	Quarter-finals	6th
2020	Did not enter	
2022	Quarter-finals	6th
2024	Group stage	6th
2026	Semi-finals	4th
2028	To be determined	
2030	To be determined	

==== Women's team ====
Year	Round	Pos
1979	Withdrew	
1980	Did not enter	
1982	Fourth place	4th
1984	Third place	3rd
1988	Did not enter	
2016	Did not enter	
2018	Did not enter	
2020	Did not enter	
2022	Did not enter	
2024	Did not enter	
2026	Group stage	8th
2028	To be determined	
2030	To be determined	

==== Mixed team ====
Year	Round	Pos
1980	Did not enter	
1982	Did not enter	
1984	Third place	3rd
1988	Did not enter	
1992	Did not enter	
1994	Group stage	
1998	Did not enter	
2000	Did not enter	
2002	Did not enter	
2004	Did not enter	
2006	Group stage	6th
2007	Semi-finals	4th
2009	Group stage	
2011	Did not enter	
2013	Group stage	9th
2014	Group stage	7th
2017	Semi-finals	3rd
2019	Quarter-finals	8th
2021	Quarter-finals	6th
2023	Quarter-finals	8th
2025	Group stage	7th
2027	To be determined	
2029	To be determined	

=== FISU World University Games ===
==== Mixed team ====
Year	Round	Pos
2007	Group stage	20th
2011	Did not enter	
2013	Did not enter	
2015	Did not enter	
2017	Did not enter	
2021	Did not enter	
2025	To be determined	

=== World University Team Championships ===
==== Mixed team ====
Year	Round	Pos
2008	Did not enter	
2010	Did not enter	
2012	Did not enter	
2014	Did not enter	
2016	Did not enter	
2018	Did not enter	

**Red border color indicates tournament was held on home soil.

== Junior competitive record ==
=== Suhandinata Cup ===
Year	Round	Pos
2000	Did not enter	
2002	Group stage	20th
2004	Did not enter	
2006	Did not enter	
2007	Did not enter	
2008	Did not enter	
2009	Did not enter	
2010	Did not enter	
2011	Did not enter	
2012	Did not enter	
2013	Did not enter	
2014	Withdrew	
2015	Withdrew	
2016	Withdrew	
2017	Did not enter	
2018	Did not enter	
2019	Did not enter	
2022	Did not enter	
2023	Did not enter	
2024	Did not enter	
2025	Did not enter	
2026	Group stage	38th of 47

=== Commonwealth Youth Games ===
==== Mixed team ====
Year	Round	Pos
2004	Did not enter	

=== African Youth Games ===
==== Men's team ====
Year	Round	Pos
2018	Did not enter	

==== Women's team ====
Year	Round	Pos
2018	Did not enter	

==== Mixed team ====
Year	Round	Pos
2014	Group stage	8th

=== African Junior Team Championships ===
==== Mixed team ====
Year	Round	Pos
1979	Withdrew	
1980	Runners-up	2nd
1982	Runners-up	2nd
1984	Third place	3rd
1988	Did not enter	
1993	Third place	3rd
1995	Fourth place	4th
1997	Fourth place	4th
1999	Fourth place	4th
2001	Fourth place	4th
2001	Group stage (Team B)	6th
2003	Group stage	5th
2005	Fourth place	4th
2007	Group stage	5th
2009	Did not enter	
2011	Did not enter	
2013	Did not enter	
2016	Group stage	
2021	Did not enter	
2022	Group stage	7th
2024	Did not enter	
2026	Did not enter	

**Red border color indicates tournament was held on home soil.

== Staff ==
The following list shows the coaching staff for the national badminton team of Zambia.

Name	Role
(Zambia) Mulenga Kingstin	Coach

== Players ==
=== Current squad ===
As of 2 January 2024

==== Men's team ====
Name	DoB/Age	Ranking of event		
Name	DoB/Age	MS	MD	XD
Chongo Mulenga	19 August 1998 (age 28)	614	230	729
Kalombo Mulenga	29 December 2001 (age 24)	289	230	319
Timothy Kafunda	4 January 1996 (age 30)	574	259	740
Mwanza Edward	10 February 2004 (age 22)	448	259	–
Mark Banda	10 July 1994 (age 32)	–	–	–
Mwansa Rodrick	7 July 1999 (age 27)	–	–	–

==== Women's team ====
Name	DoB/Age	Ranking of event		
Name	DoB/Age	WS	WD	XD
Elizaberth Chipeleme	4 August 1992 (age 34)	429	349	319
Evelyn Siamupangila	26 January 1997 (age 29)	399	349	729
Matildah Kalandanya	12 October 2003 (age 22)	726	502	740
Victoria Mulengula	19 August 1996 (age 30)	726	502	–
Martha Mkandawire	10 January 2004 (age 22)	–	–	–
Tukuza Mbewe	22 August 2001 (age 25)	–	–	–

=== Previous squads ===
==== Commonwealth Games ====
- Mixed team: 2018, 2022

==== African Games ====
- Mixed team: 2019

==== African Team Championships ====
- Men's team: 2010, 2018, 2022
- Mixed team: 2013, 2014, 2017, 2021, 2023

== See also ==
- Sport in Zambia
