= Mozambique national badminton team =

National badminton team representing Mozambique

Mozambique
- Association: Federação Moçambicana de Badminton (FMB)
- Confederation: BCA (Africa)
- President: Luis Santos

BWF ranking
- Current ranking: Unranked (2 April 2024)
- Highest ranking: 85 (4 July 2023)

African Mixed Team Championships
- Appearances: 4 (first in 1980)
- Best result: Champions (1984)

African Men's Team Championships
- Appearances: 3 (first in 1980)
- Best result: Third place (1984)

African Women's Team Championships
- Appearances: 3 (first in 1980)
- Best result: Champions (1984)

The Mozambique national badminton team (Portuguese: Seleção nacional de badminton de Moçambique) represents Mozambique in international badminton team competitions. The Mozambican national team is controlled by the Mozambique Badminton Federation (FMB; Federacao Moçambicana de Badminton). Badminton has been played in Mozambique since the 1960s. Mozambique was one of the seven African countries that formed the Badminton Confederation of Africa on 31 August 1977.

Mozambique first competed in the African Badminton Championships in 1980, where it was also the host. The team also made their debut in the African Games in 2011.

== History ==
=== Men's team ===
Mozambique finished in fourth place in the men's team event at the African Badminton Championships in 1980 and 1982. In 1984, the team finished in third place at the African Badminton Championships.

=== Women's team ===
In 1982, the Mozambican women's team gave the country their first ever podium appearance in international badminton when the women's team finished in third place for bronze.

=== Mixed team ===
Mozambique competed in the African Badminton Championships mixed team event in 1982. The team finished in third place.

In 2011, the Mozambican team competed in the 2011 All-African Games mixed team event. The team were grouped with Seychelles and Uganda but lost 5–0 to both teams and finished last in the group. Mozambique made their second appearance in the African Badminton Championships mixed team event after four decades. The team finished last in their group after losing 5–0 to South Africa and Uganda.

== Competitive record ==
=== Thomas Cup ===
Year	Round	Pos
1949	Part of Portugal	
1952	Part of Portugal	
1955	Part of Portugal	
1958	Part of Portugal	
1961	Part of Portugal	
1964	Part of Portugal	
1967	Part of Portugal	
1970	Part of Portugal	
1973	Part of Portugal	
1976	Did not enter	
1979	Did not enter	
1982	Did not enter	
1984	Did not enter	
1986	Did not qualify	
1988	Did not qualify	
1990	Did not enter	
1992	Did not enter	
1994	Did not enter	
1996	Did not enter	
1998	Did not enter	
2000	Did not enter	
2002	Did not enter	
2004	Did not enter	
2006	Did not enter	
2008	Did not enter	
2010	Did not enter	
2012	Did not enter	
2014	Did not enter	
2016	Did not enter	
2018	Did not enter	
2020	Did not enter	
2022	Did not enter	
2024	Did not enter	
2026	Did not enter	
2028	To be determined	
2030	To be determined	

=== Uber Cup ===
Year	Round	Pos
1957 to 1975	Part of Portugal	
1975 to 2026	Did not enter	
2028	To be determined	
2030	To be determined	

=== Sudirman Cup ===
Year	Round	Pos
1989 to 2021	Did not enter	
2023	Did not qualify	
2025	To be determined	
2027	To be determined	
2029	To be determined	

=== African Games ===
==== Mixed team ====
Year	Round	Pos
2003	Did not enter	
2007	Did not enter	
2011	Group stage	
2015	Did not enter	
2019	Did not enter	
2027	To be determined	

=== African Team Championships ===
==== Men's team ====
Year	Round	Pos
1979	Did not enter	
1980	Fourth place	4th
1982	Fourth place	4th
1984	Third place	3rd
1988	Did not enter	
2016	Did not enter	
2018	Did not enter	
2020	Did not enter	
2022	Did not enter	
2024	Did not enter	
2026	To be determined	
2028	To be determined	
2030	To be determined	

==== Women's team ====
Year	Round	Pos
1979	Did not enter	
1980	Fourth place	4th
1982	Third place	3rd
1984	Champions	1st
1988	Did not enter	
2016	Did not enter	
2018	Did not enter	
2020	Did not enter	
2022	Did not enter	
2024	Did not enter	
2026	To be determined	
2028	To be determined	
2030	To be determined	

==== Mixed team ====
Year	Round	Pos
1980	Fourth place	4th
1982	Third place	3rd
1984	Champions	1st
1988	Did not enter	
1992	Did not enter	
1994	Did not enter	
1998	Group stage	
2000	Did not enter	
2002	Did not enter	
2004	Did not enter	
2006	Did not enter	
2007	Did not enter	
2009	Did not enter	
2011	Did not enter	
2013	Did not enter	
2014	Did not enter	
2017	Did not enter	
2019	Did not enter	
2021	Did not enter	
2023	Group stage	12th
2025	To be determined	
2027	To be determined	
2029	To be determined	

**Red border color indicates tournament was held on home soil.

== Junior competitive record ==
=== Suhandinata Cup ===
Year	Round	Pos
2000 to 2024	Did not enter	
2025	To be determined	

=== African Youth Games ===
==== Men's team ====
Year	Round	Pos
2018	Did not enter	

==== Women's team ====
Year	Round	Pos
2018	Did not enter	

==== Mixed team ====
Year	Round	Pos
2014	Did not enter	

=== African Junior Team Championships ===
==== Mixed team ====
Year	Round	Pos
1979	Did not enter	
1980	Third place	3rd
1982	Third place	3rd
1984	Champions	1st
1993	Fifth place	5th
1995	Sixth place	6th
1997	Did not enter	
1999	Did not enter	
2001	Did not enter	
2003	Did not enter	
2005	Did not enter	
2007	Did not enter	
2009	Did not enter	
2011	Did not enter	
2013	Did not enter	
2016	Did not enter	
2021	Did not enter	
2022	Did not enter	
2024	To be determined	

**Red border color indicates tournament was held on home soil.

== Players ==
=== Current squad ===
As of 2 January 2024

==== Men's team ====
Name	DoB/Age	Ranking of event		
Name	DoB/Age	MS	MD	XD
Idrisse Issofo Mossagy	14 November 1984 (age 41)	598	711	740
Edmilson Paulo Mutondo	19 April 1998 (age 28)	1057	711	458

==== Women's team ====
Name	DoB/Age	Ranking of event		
Name	DoB/Age	WS	WD	XD
Jessica de Almeida	25 November 2000 (age 25)	580	448	458
Afrika Matsinhe	12 July 1998 (age 27)	580	448	740

=== Previous squads ===
==== African Team Championships ====
- Mixed team: 2023
