= Tanzania national badminton team =

National badminton team representing Tanzania

Tanzania
- Association: Tanzania Badminton Association (TBA)
- Confederation: BCA (Africa)
- President: Abdulmalik Sumar

BWF ranking
- Current ranking: Unranked (2 April 2024)
- Highest ranking: 106 (3 October 2013)

African Mixed Team Championships
- Appearances: 5 (first in 1979)
- Best result: Runners-up (1984)

African Men's Team Championships
- Appearances: 4 (first in 1979)
- Best result: Champions (1984)

African Women's Team Championships
- Appearances: 4 (first in 1979)
- Best result: Champions (1979)

The Tanzania national badminton team (Swahili: Timu ya taifa ya Tanzania ya mchezo wa badminton) represents Tanzania in international badminton team competitions. Tanzania is one of the first seven founding nations of the Badminton Confederation of Africa. In the 1990s Tanzanian players have made numerous achievements in the African stage, winning two bronze medals at the 1992 African Badminton Championships.

Since the 2000s, the team became inactive from international team tournaments due to insufficient funds which impacted Tanzanian badminton's decrease in popularity. Many regional badminton tournaments, such as the Nyerere Badminton Championships and the Dar Cup have been hosted to revive badminton in Tanzania. As of 2022, the national team along with its association is still inactive.

== History ==
Badminton in Tanzania began in the mid-20th century when the country was still under British rule. After the country gained independence from the British in 1961, the Tanganyika national badminton team was formed and soon competed in tournaments hosted around the country, such as the Tanganyika International. Players were later allowed to compete internationally after the establishment of the Tanzania Badminton Association in 1977.

In the 70s and the 80s, the Tanzanian national team was composed mostly of players of Indian descent like Raju Chiplunkar and Mukesh Shah, who have represented Tanzania in badminton at the Commonwealth Games. In the late 80s, players from Zanzibar who achieved decent results in the sport started to represent the national team. The most notable players from Zanzibar were Mohamed Juma, Nasra Juma and Mselem Juma who have medaled at African championships.

=== Men's team ===
In early 1979, Tanzania sent its men's team to compete in the men's team event at the inaugural African Badminton Championships. The team finished in second place. In June 1979, the team competed in the men's team event at the 1979 WBF World Championships. The team were placed in Group 4 with Thailand, Burma and Mauritius. The team lost 5–0 to Thailand and Burma. In their third playoff, the team lost 3–2 to Mauritius and were eliminated in the group stages.

The team also achieved gold on home soil at the 1984 African Badminton Championships. In 1988, the team finished as runners-up at the 1988 African Badminton Championships after losing 5–0 to Nigeria. In 1992, the team took part in qualifying for the 1992 Thomas & Uber Cup in Hong Kong. The team were drawn to Group C with Hong Kong, Australia and Sri Lanka. The team failed to qualify after losing 5–0 to all three teams in their group.

=== Women's team ===
The Tanzanian women's team competed in the 1979 African Badminton Championships and won the women's team title. In 1984, the team won silver at the 1984 African Badminton Championships. In 1992, the team competed in the 1992 Thomas & Uber Cup regional qualifiers in Hong Kong alongside the men's team. The team lost all their matches to Hong Kong, New Zealand and the Philippines in their group tie.

=== Mixed team ===
The Tanzanian mixed team competed in the 1984 African Badminton Championships and finished in second place.

== Competitive record ==
=== Thomas Cup ===
Year	Round	Pos
1949 to 1961	Part of the United Kingdom	
1964 to 1990	Did not enter	
1992	Did not qualify	
1994	Did not enter	
1996	Did not enter	
1998	Did not enter	
2000	Did not enter	
2002	Did not enter	
2004	Did not enter	
2006	Did not enter	
2008	Did not enter	
2010	Did not enter	
2012	Did not enter	
2014	Did not enter	
2016	Did not enter	
2018	Did not enter	
2020	Did not enter	
2022	Did not enter	
2024	Did not enter	
2026	To be determined	
2028	To be determined	
2030	To be determined	

=== Uber Cup ===
Year	Round	Pos
1949 to 1961	Part of the United Kingdom	
1964 to 1990	Did not enter	
1992	Did not qualify	
1994	Did not enter	
1996	Did not enter	
1998	Did not enter	
2000	Did not enter	
2002	Did not enter	
2004	Did not enter	
2006	Did not enter	
2008	Did not enter	
2010	Did not enter	
2012	Did not enter	
2014	Did not enter	
2016	Did not enter	
2018	Did not enter	
2020	Did not enter	
2022	Did not enter	
2024	Did not enter	
2026	To be determined	
2028	To be determined	
2030	To be determined	

=== Sudirman Cup ===
Year	Round	Pos
1989	Did not enter	
1991	Did not enter	
1993	Did not enter	
1995	Did not enter	
1997	Did not enter	
1999	Did not enter	
2001	Did not enter	
2003	Did not enter	
2005	Did not enter	
2007	Did not enter	
2009	Did not enter	
2011	Did not enter	
2013	Did not enter	
2015	Did not enter	
2017	Did not enter	
2019	Did not enter	
2021	Did not enter	
2023	Did not enter	
2025	To be determined	
2027	To be determined	
2029	To be determined	

=== WBF World Championships ===
==== Men's team ====
Year	Round	Pos
1979	Group stage	

==== Women's team ====
Year	Round	Pos
1979	Did not enter	

=== Commonwealth Games ===
==== Men's team ====
Year	Round	Pos
1998	Did not enter	

==== Women's team ====
Year	Round	Pos
1998	Did not enter	

==== Mixed team ====
Year	Round	Pos
1978	Did not enter	
1982	Did not enter	
1986	Did not enter	
1990	Did not enter	
1994	Did not enter	
2002	Did not enter	
2006	Did not enter	
2010	Did not enter	
2014	Did not enter	
2018	Did not enter	
2022	Did not enter	
2026	TBD	

=== African Games ===
==== Mixed team ====
Year	Round	Pos
2003	Did not enter	
2007	Did not enter	
2011	Did not enter	
2015	Did not enter	
2019	Did not enter	
2027	TBD	

=== African Team Championships ===
==== Men's team ====
Year	Round	Pos
1979	Runners-up	2nd
1980	Third place	3rd
1982	Did not enter	
1984	Champions	1st
1988	Runners-up	2nd
2016	Did not enter	
2018	Did not enter	
2020	Did not enter	
2022	Did not enter	
2024	Did not enter	
2026	To be determined	
2028	To be determined	
2030	To be determined	

==== Women's team ====
Year	Round	Pos
1979	Champions	1st
1980	Third place	3rd
1982	Did not enter	
1984	Runners-up	2nd
1988	Runners-up	2nd
2016	Did not enter	
2018	Did not enter	
2020	Did not enter	
2022	Did not enter	
2024	Did not enter	
2026	To be determined	
2028	To be determined	
2030	To be determined	

==== Mixed team ====
Year	Round	Pos
1980	Third place	3rd
1982	Did not enter	
1984	Runners-up	2nd
1988	Runners-up	2nd
1992	Semi-finals	4th
1994	Did not enter	
1998	Did not enter	
2000	Did not enter	
2002	Did not enter	
2004	Did not enter	
2006	Did not enter	
2007	Did not enter	
2009	Did not enter	
2011	Did not enter	
2013	Did not enter	
2014	Did not enter	
2017	Did not enter	
2019	Did not enter	
2021	Did not enter	
2023	Did not enter	
2025	To be determined	
2027	To be determined	
2029	To be determined	

**Red border color indicates tournament was held on home soil.

== Junior competitive record ==
=== Suhandinata Cup ===
Year	Round	Pos
2000	Did not enter	
2002	Did not enter	
2004	Did not enter	
2006	Did not enter	
2007	Did not enter	
2008	Did not enter	
2009	Did not enter	
2010	Did not enter	
2011	Did not enter	
2012	Did not enter	
2013	Did not enter	
2014	Did not enter	
2015	Did not enter	
2016	Did not enter	
2017	Did not enter	
2018	Did not enter	
2019	Did not enter	
2022	Did not enter	
2023	Did not enter	
2024	Did not enter	

=== Commonwealth Youth Games ===
==== Mixed team ====
Year	Round	Pos
2004	Did not enter	

=== African Youth Games ===
==== Men's team ====
Year	Round	Pos
2018	Did not enter	

==== Women's team ====
Year	Round	Pos
2018	Did not enter	

==== Mixed team ====
Year	Round	Pos
2014	Did not enter	

=== African Junior Team Championships ===
==== Mixed team ====
Year	Round	Pos
1979	Runners-up	2nd
1980	Fourth place	4th
1982	Did not enter	
1984	Runners-up	2nd
1988	Runners-up	2nd
1993	Fourth place	4th
1995	Did not enter	
1997	Did not enter	
1999	Did not enter	
2001	Did not enter	
2003	Did not enter	
2005	Did not enter	
2007	Did not enter	
2009	Did not enter	
2011	Did not enter	
2013	Did not enter	
2016	Did not enter	
2021	Did not enter	
2022	Did not enter	
2024	TBD	

**Red border color indicates tournament was held on home soil.

== Players ==
=== Current squad ===
As of 2 April 2024

==== Men's team ====
Name	DoB/Age	Ranking of event		
Name	DoB/Age	MS	MD	XD
Haji Hassanali Mawoko	15 May 1987 (age 39)	–	–	–
Atish Shah	6 December 1992 (age 33)	–	–	–
Sammer Champsi		–	–	–

==== Women's team ====
Name	DoB/Age	Ranking of event		
Name	DoB/Age	WS	WD	XD
Abida Hassanali		–	–	–
Nazneen Rahim		–	–	–
Nazneen Abbas		–	–	–
