= 1982 African Badminton Championships =

Tournament details
- Dates: 2–7 May
- Edition: 3rd
- Venue: National Stadium Sports Hall
- Location: Lagos, Nigeria

The 1982 African Badminton Championships was a continental stage tournament to crown the best badminton squads and players in Africa. The tournament took place from 2 to 7 May 1982 at the National Stadium Sports Hall in Lagos, Nigeria.

Similar to the previous edition, four events were held, which were the men's team, women's team, mixed team and the junior mixed team. Kenya, Tanzania and Zimbabwe declined their participation from the tournament.

Hosts Nigeria showed dominance by winning first place in all four events. Zambia clinched silver in the men's team event and the junior team event. Ghana were runners-up at the women's team and the mixed team.

== Medalists ==
Event	Gold	Silver	Bronze
Men's team	Nigeria; Babatunde Badiru; Folusho Davies; Samson Egbeyemi; Clement Ogbo; Benjamin Orakpo; Fatai Tokosi	Zambia; Simon Gondwe; Ajay Misra; Raj Patel; Shailesh Patel; Hiran Ray; Mike Wilmott	Ghana; Kodjo Asamoah; Paul Kodjo Kumah; Frank Kwami; Mario Kwami; Mario Appiagyei-Danka
Women's team	Nigeria; Bukola Bakreen; Oby Edoga; Grace Edwards; I. Owolabi	Ghana; Abigail Haizel; Phyllis Nimako-Boateng; Nelly Akainyah; Margaret Asare; Patricia Asare	Mozambique; Indira Bhikha; Eduarda Geraldes; Eva Stuard; Eline Coelho
Mixed team	Nigeria; Babatunde Badiru; Samson Egbeyemi; Bukola Bakreen; Grace Edwards	Ghana; Kodjo Asamoah; Paul Kodjo Kumah; Abigail Haizel; Phyllis Nimako-Boateng	Mozambique; Luis Filipe; Sozinho Guerra; Indira Bhikha; Eva Stuard
Junior mixed team	Nigeria	Zambia	Mozambique

=== Medal table ===
* Host nation (Nigeria)

Rank	Nation	Gold	Silver	Bronze	Total
1	Nigeria*	4	0	0	4
2	Ghana	0	2	1	3
3	Zambia	0	2	0	2
4	Mozambique	0	0	3	3
Totals (4 entries)		4	4	4	12
