= Kumasi Technical Institute =

Location
- P. O. Box; Ashanti Region; Kumasi; Ghana

Information
- Type: Public high school
- Established: 1976 (50 years ago)
- Status: Active
- Oversight: Ministry of Education
- Gender: Mixed
- Age: 14 to 18
- Classes offered: General arts, home economics, science
- Website: kti.edu.gh

Kumasi Technical Institute is a coeducational second-cycle technical school in Kumasi in the Ashanti Region of Ghana.

== History ==
The school was established in 1976 with support from the government of Ghana.

== See also ==
- Education in Ghana
- List of senior high schools in the Ashanti Region
