= Ghana Badminton =

Governing body of badminton in Ghana

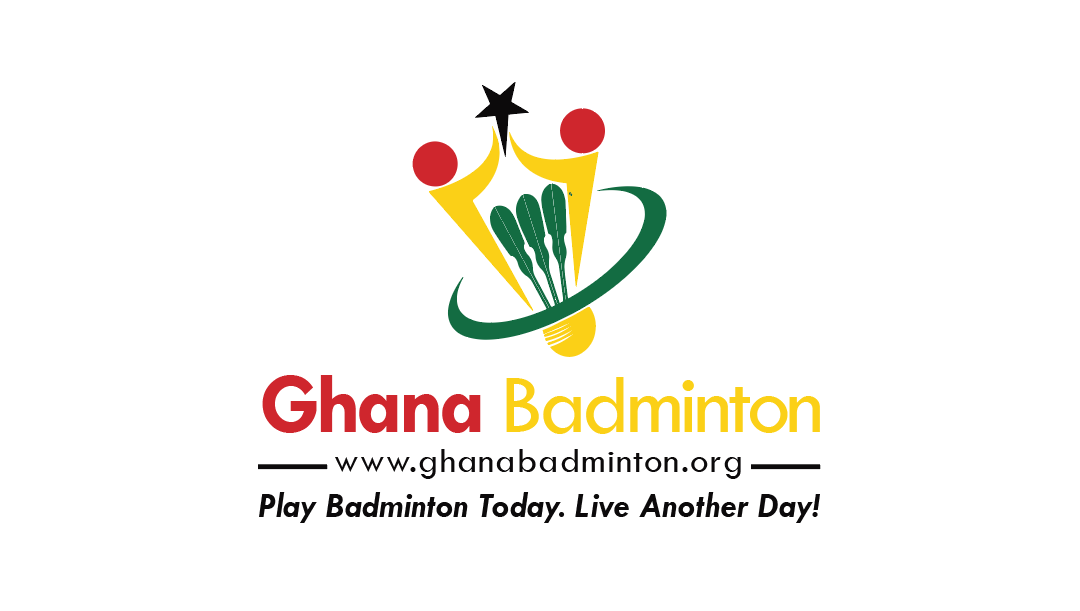
- Type: National Sport Federation
- Legal status: National Sport Federation
- Headquarters: Accra, Ghana
- Region served: Africa
- Members: Circa of 4.6 million playing Ghanaian Population
- President: Yeboah Evans
- Parent organization: National Sports Authority
- Affiliations: MOYS, NSA, BCA, GOC, BWF, NPC
- Budget: 3.6 million USD
- Staff: 4
- Volunteers: 76
- Website: www.ghanabadminton.org

Ghana Badminton is the national governing body of badminton in Ghana. They are responsible for representing, coordinating, administering, marketing, and developing the sport in close cooperation with related bodies. The Ghana Badminton Association focuses on both grassroots events as well as promoting Ghanaians to compete at the Olympics, the Commonwealth Games, and the Paralympic Games. Established in 1962, the national association works with corporate sponsors to host events locally and develop podium professional players, technical officials, and coaches.

The National Federation is a founding member of the Badminton Confederation of Africa and an affiliate member of the Badminton World Federation (BWF). In tandem with growing the sport, it provides primary, senior high, and tertiary programs to schools, veteran social badminton delivered from schools, community, and regional clubs, national class coaching development, and significant events.

== Presidents ==
Since its inception in 1962, the Ghana Badminton Association has had seven presidents.

- Lt. Col Kumi
- Mr. Akainyah, Esq
- Mr F.M. Dickson
- Mr. Charles K. Darko
- Mr. Paul Kodjokuma
- Mr. Nestor Percy Galley
- Yeboah Evans
