= 1984 African Badminton Championships =

Tournament details
- Dates: August 1984
- Edition: 4th
- Location: Dar es Salaam, Tanzania

The 1984 African Badminton Championships was a continental stage tournament to crown the best badminton squads and players in Africa. The tournament took place in August 1984 at Dar es Salaam, Tanzania. This edition of the championships introduced five new events, which were the individual events. The tournament was initially scheduled to be held in May.

Simon Gondwe of Zambia won the gold medal in the men's singles title after defeating Firoz of Tanzania. In the women's singles event, Indira Bhikha became the first Mozambican to win gold in the African championships.

== Background ==
Originally, ten countries planned to participate in the tournament, these countries were Gabon, Ghana, Kenya, Mauritius, Mozambique, Nigeria, Uganda, Zambia, Seychelles, and hosts Tanzania. The participating countries were later reduced. Malawi, Lesotho, Madagascar and Swaziland also planned to send players to the championships but later declined participation. Nigeria withdrew from the tournament.

== Medalists ==
=== Individual events ===
Event	Gold	Silver	Bronze
Men's singles	(Zambia) Simon Gondwe	(Tanzania) Firoz Din	(Tanzania) Mukesh Shah
Men's singles	(Zambia) Simon Gondwe	(Tanzania) Firoz Din	(Mozambique) Luis Antonio Timm
Women's singles	(Mozambique) Indira Bhikha	(Tanzania) Nasra Juma	(Zambia) Josephine Chipepo
Women's singles	(Mozambique) Indira Bhikha	(Tanzania) Nasra Juma	(Zambia) Mary Mukangwa
Men's doubles	(Tanzania) Firoz Din (Tanzania) Mukesh Shah	(Zambia) Raj Patel (Zambia) Shailesh Patel	(Zambia) Simon Gondwe (Zambia) Abraham Mutale
Men's doubles	(Tanzania) Firoz Din (Tanzania) Mukesh Shah	(Zambia) Raj Patel (Zambia) Shailesh Patel	(Mozambique) Sozinho Guerra (Mozambique) Luis Antonio Timm
Women's doubles	(Mozambique) Indira Bhikha (Mozambique) Eline Coelho	(Zambia) Josephine Chipepo (Zambia) Mary Mukangwa	(Tanzania) Nasra Juma (Tanzania) Sharifa Juma
Women's doubles	(Mozambique) Indira Bhikha (Mozambique) Eline Coelho	(Zambia) Josephine Chipepo (Zambia) Mary Mukangwa	(Zambia) Priscilla Mutambirwa (Zambia) Madhavi Tijoriwala
Mixed doubles	(Mozambique) Sozinho Guerra (Mozambique) Indira Bhikha	(Tanzania) Mukesh Shah (Tanzania) Nasra Juma	(Zambia) Abraham Mutale (Zambia) Josephine Chipepo
Mixed doubles	(Mozambique) Sozinho Guerra (Mozambique) Indira Bhikha	(Tanzania) Mukesh Shah (Tanzania) Nasra Juma	(Zambia) Simon Gondwe (Zambia) Mary Mukangwa

=== Team events ===
Event	Gold	Silver	Bronze
Men's team	Tanzania	Zambia	Mozambique
Women's team	Mozambique	Tanzania	Zambia
Mixed team	Mozambique	Tanzania	Zambia
Junior mixed team	Mozambique	Tanzania	Zambia

=== Medal table ===
* Host nation (Tanzania)

Rank	Nation	Gold	Silver	Bronze	Total
1	Mozambique	6	0	3	9
2	Tanzania*	2	6	2	10
3	Zambia	1	3	9	13
Totals (3 entries)		9	9	14	32
