= 1979 African Badminton Championships =

Tournament details
- Dates: 10–20 April
- Edition: 1st
- Venue: Kumasi Technical Institute
- Location: Kumasi, Ghana

The 1979 African Badminton Championships was a continental stage tournament to crown the best badminton squads and players in Africa. The tournament was marked as the inaugural edition of the African Badminton Championships. The tournament took place from 10 to 20 April 1979 at the Kumasi Technical Institute in Kumasi, Ghana.

Originally, the tournament was scheduled to be played in August 1979, with six countries participating in the tournament. Due to the competition date being changed repeatedly, Mozambique and Nigeria decided to pull out of the tournament. Zambia sent two junior players to compete in the junior events but reached the wrong venue and had to withdraw from the competition.

The men's team event was won by Kenya while Tanzania clinched the women's team title. Hosts Ghana had to settle for bronze.

== Medalists ==
Event	Gold	Silver	Bronze
Men's team	Kenya; Moez Alibhai; Andy Nicol; Amjid Rasul; Narendra K. Shah; Rajesh Shah; Pradesh Sodha	Tanzania; Ali Abed; Fuad Ahmed; Raju Chiplunkar; Mukesh Nathwani; Mukesh Shah	Ghana; Kodjo Asamoah; Ralph Bannerman-Wood; Ralph Defoe; Paul Kodjo Kumah; Mario Kwami; Frank Kwami
Women's team	Tanzania; Esther Mosha; S. Chiplunkar; Fatma Selemani	Kenya; Shamin Noormohamed; Chris Maskell; Naila Valani	Ghana; Nelly Akainyah; Abigail Haizel; Phyllis Nimako-Boateng
Junior mixed team	Kenya	Tanzania	Ghana

=== Medal table ===
* Host nation (Ghana)

Rank	Nation	Gold	Silver	Bronze	Total
1	Kenya	2	1	0	3
2	Tanzania	1	2	0	3
3	Ghana*	0	0	3	3
Totals (3 entries)		3	3	3	9
