= 1980 African Badminton Championships =

Tournament details
- Dates: 22–25 June
- Edition: 2nd
- Venue: Beira Sports Pavilion
- Location: Beira, Mozambique

The 1980 African Badminton Championships (Portuguese: Campeonato Africano de Badminton de 1980) was a continental stage tournament to crown the best badminton squads and players in Africa. The tournament took place from 22 to 25 June 1980. The tournament was held at the Beira Sports Pavilion which stands next to the Mozambique Company Employees Club in Beira, Mozambique.

The tournament consisted of four events, the men's team event and the women's team event which were named the Julius Nyerere Cup in honor of the late Julius Nyerere, who contributed in funding for the African championships in 1979. The mixed team event was named the June 25 Cup to commemorate the date of Mozambique's independence from Portugal. The junior mixed team event, the Dapo Tejuoso's Cup was named after the vice president of the Badminton Confederation of Africa.

Nigeria dominated the championships by winning the men's team, mixed team and junior mixed team titles. Zimbabwe made their debut in the championships and won the women's team event. Zambia finished up as runners-up at the junior mixed team event.

== Medalists ==
Event	Gold	Silver	Bronze
Men's team	Nigeria; Babatunde Badiru; Monday Edo; Samson Egbeyemi; Ishola Iyiola; Clement Ogbo	Kenya; John Mwangi; Narendra K. Shah; Amjid Rasul; Vijai Maini; Hitesh Patani	Tanzania; Raju Chiplunkar; Mohamed Juma; Mukesh Shah; Shahnawaz Kayumali
Women's team	Zimbabwe; Trish Donaghy; Ann Folcarelli; Merle Palmer	Nigeria; Bukola Bakreen; Oby Edoga; Grace Edwards	Tanzania; S. Chiplunkar; Esther Mosha; Nasra Juma
Mixed team	Nigeria; Babatunde Badiru; Monday Edo; Samson Egbeyemi; Ishola Iyiola; Clement Ogbo; Bukola Bakreen; Oby Edoga; Grace Edwards	Kenya; John Mwangi; Narendra K. Shah; Amjid Rasul; Vijai Maini; Hitesh Patani; Shamin Noormohamed; Chris Maskell; Naila Valani	Tanzania; Raju Chiplunkar; Mohamed Juma; Mukesh Shah; Shahnawaz Kayumali; S. Chiplunkar; Esther Mosha; Nasra Juma
Junior mixed team	Nigeria	Zambia	Mozambique

=== Medal table ===
* Host nation (Mozambique)

Rank	Nation	Gold	Silver	Bronze	Total
1	Nigeria	3	1	0	4
2	Zimbabwe	1	0	0	1
3	Kenya	0	2	1	3
4	Zambia	0	1	0	1
5	Tanzania	0	0	3	3
6	Mozambique*	0	0	1	1
Totals (6 entries)		4	4	5	13
