= 1992 African Badminton Championships =

Badminton tournament

Tournament details
- Dates: 10 – 26 April
- Edition: 6th
- Venue: National Badminton Centre
- Location: Port Louis, Mauritius

The 1992 African Badminton Championships was a continental badminton tournament organized by the Badminton Confederation of Africa to crown the best badminton players in Africa. This championships were held in Port Louis, Mauritius from 10 to 26 April. This tournament also served as the African qualifiers for the 1992 Summer Olympics.

The South Africa national badminton team topped the medal table, winning four golds, four silvers and two bronzes in the championships. Nigeria withdrew from the individual events after their walkover from the team event final against South Africa.

== Medalists ==
Event	Gold	Silver	Bronze
Men's singles	(Mauritius) Eddy Clarisse	(South Africa) Anton Kriel	(South Africa) Nico Meerholz
Men's singles	(Mauritius) Eddy Clarisse	(South Africa) Anton Kriel	(South Africa) Alan Phillips
Women's singles	(South Africa) Lina Fourie	(South Africa) Augusta Phillips	(Mauritius) Martine de Souza
Women's singles	(South Africa) Lina Fourie	(South Africa) Augusta Phillips	(South Africa) Vanessa van der Walt
Men's doubles	(South Africa) Anton Kriel (South Africa) Nico Meerholz	(Mauritius) Gilles Allet (Mauritius) Eddy Clarisse	(Tanzania) Mohamed Juma (Tanzania) Mselem Juma
Men's doubles	(South Africa) Anton Kriel (South Africa) Nico Meerholz	(Mauritius) Gilles Allet (Mauritius) Eddy Clarisse	(Namibia) Roy Dempsey (Namibia) Eddie Ward
Women's doubles	(South Africa) Augusta Phillips (South Africa) Tracey Thompson	(South Africa) Lina Fourie (South Africa) Vanessa van der Walt	(Mozambique) Gudrun Murray (Namibia) Ella Scholtz
Women's doubles	(South Africa) Augusta Phillips (South Africa) Tracey Thompson	(South Africa) Lina Fourie (South Africa) Vanessa van der Walt	(Namibia) Bianca Kustner (Namibia) Heidi Spinas
Mixed doubles	(South Africa) Anton Kriel (South Africa) Lina Fourie	(South Africa) Alan Phillips (South Africa) Augusta Phillips	(Tanzania) Mohamed Juma (Tanzania) Nasra Juma
Mixed doubles	(South Africa) Anton Kriel (South Africa) Lina Fourie	(South Africa) Alan Phillips (South Africa) Augusta Phillips	(South Africa) Nico Meerholz (South Africa) Tracey Thompson
Mixed team	South Africa	Nigeria	Tanzania
Mixed team	South Africa	Nigeria	Mauritius

=== Medal table ===
* Host nation (Mauritius)

Rank	Nation	Gold	Silver	Bronze	Total
1	South Africa	5	4	4	13
2	Mauritius*	1	1	2	4
3	Nigeria	0	1	0	1
4	Tanzania	0	0	3	3
5	Namibia	0	0	2.5	2.5
6	Mozambique	0	0	0.5	0.5
Totals (6 entries)		6	6	12	24

== Team event ==
=== Group stage ===
==== Group A ====
Team	Pld	W	L	MF	MA	MD	Pts
Nigeria	3	3	0	13	2	+11	3
Mauritius	3	2	1	12	3	+9	2
Ghana	3	1	2	3	12	−9	1
Madagascar	3	0	3	2	13	−11	0

Nigeria	3–2	Mauritius
Nigeria	5–0	Ghana
Nigeria	5–0	Madagascar
Mauritius	5–0	Ghana
Mauritius	5–0	Madagascar
Ghana	3–2	Madagascar

==== Group B ====
Team	Pld	W	L	MF	MA	MD	Pts
South Africa	3	3	0	15	0	+15	3
Tanzania	3	2	1	8	7	+1	2
Namibia	3	1	2	6	9	−3	1
Seychelles	3	0	3	1	14	−13	0

South Africa	5–0	Tanzania
South Africa	5–0	Namibia
South Africa	5–0	Seychelles
Tanzania	3–2	Namibia
Tanzania	5–0	Seychelles
Namibia	4–1	Seychelles

=== Knockout stage ===
Semi-finals
Nigeria	5
Tanzania	0
Mauritius	2
South Africa	3

Final
Nigeria
South Africa	w/o

In the final of the team event, South Africa won by default after the Nigerian team refused to play against the Republic. The Nigerian team noted that South Africa was not properly qualified for the tournament.
