= Badminton at the 2010 Commonwealth Games – Mixed team =

The mixed team event of badminton at the 2010 Commonwealth Games was held from 4 to 8 October 2010 in Siri Fort Sports Complex, New Delhi, India where 20 teams competed in the competition.

Defending champions, Malaysia, won the gold medal for the second time in a row. They repeated this victory four years later at the 2014 Commonwealth Games in Glasgow. India took their first silver in the mixed team event and England settled for bronze.

== Seeds ==
Five pots arranged during the draw, with pot 1 is strongest, while pot 5 was the weakest team in the event.

Pot 1	Pot 2	Pot 3	Pot 4	Pot 5
Malaysia; India; England; Singapore	Canada; New Zealand; Australia; Scotland	Wales; Mauritius; Nigeria; Sri Lanka	Jamaica; Uganda; Seychelles; Barbados	Kenya; Falkland Islands; Isle of Man; Northern Ireland

== Results ==
=== Group stage ===
==== Group A ====
Team	Pts	Pld	W	L	GW	GL
Malaysia	8	4	4	0	40	1
Australia	6	4	3	1	30	13
Nigeria	4	4	2	2	16	27
Seychelles	2	4	1	3	10	30
Isle of Man	0	4	0	4	9	34

4 October 2010
Malaysia	5–0	Isle of Man
Australia	5–0	Seychelles
Nigeria	4–1	Isle of Man
Malaysia	5–0	Seychelles
5 October 2010
Seychelles	3–2	Isle of Man
Australia	5–0	Nigeria
Malaysia	5–0	Nigeria
Australia	4–1	Isle of Man
6 October 2010
Nigeria	3–2	Seychelles
Malaysia	5–0	Australia

==== Group B ====
Team	Pts	Pld	W	L	GW	GL
Singapore	8	4	4	0	40	1
New Zealand	6	3	3	1	26	15
Sri Lanka	4	3	2	2	26	20
Northern Ireland	2	4	1	3	12	33
Jamaica	0	4	0	4	4	39

4 October 2010
Singapore	5–0	Northern Ireland
New Zealand	5–0	Jamaica
Sri Lanka	5–0	Northern Ireland
Singapore	5–0	Jamaica
5 October 2010
New Zealand	3–2	Sri Lanka
Jamaica	1–4	Northern Ireland
Singapore	5–0	Sri Lanka
New Zealand	5–0	Northern Ireland
6 October 2010
Singapore	5–0	New Zealand
Sri Lanka	5–0	Jamaica

==== Group C ====
Team	Pts	Pld	W	L	GW	GL
England	8	4	4	0	38	3
Canada	6	4	3	1	33	8
Mauritius	2	4	2	2	18	23
Uganda	2	4	1	3	13	29
Falkland Islands	0	4	0	4	1	40

4 October 2010
Canada	5–0	Uganda
England	5–0	Falkland Islands
Mauritius	5–0	Falkland Islands
England	5–0	Uganda
5 October 2010
Canada	5–0	Mauritius
Uganda	5–0	Falkland Islands
6 October 2010
Canada	5–0	Falkland Islands
England	5–0	Mauritius
Mauritius	4–1	Uganda
England	4–1	Canada

==== Group D ====
Team	Pts	Pld	W	L	GW	GL
India	8	4	4	0	38	3
Scotland	6	4	3	1	33	8
Wales	2	4	2	2	20	20
Barbados	2	4	1	3	8	33
Kenya	0	4	0	4	3	38

4 October 2010
India	5–0	Kenya
Scotland	5–0	Barbados
5 October 2010
Wales	5–0	Kenya
India	5–0	Barbados
Barbados	4-1	Kenya
Scotland	5–0	Wales
6 October 2010
India	5–0	Wales
Scotland	5–0	Kenya
India	4–1	Scotland
Wales	5–0	Barbados

=== Round of 16 ===
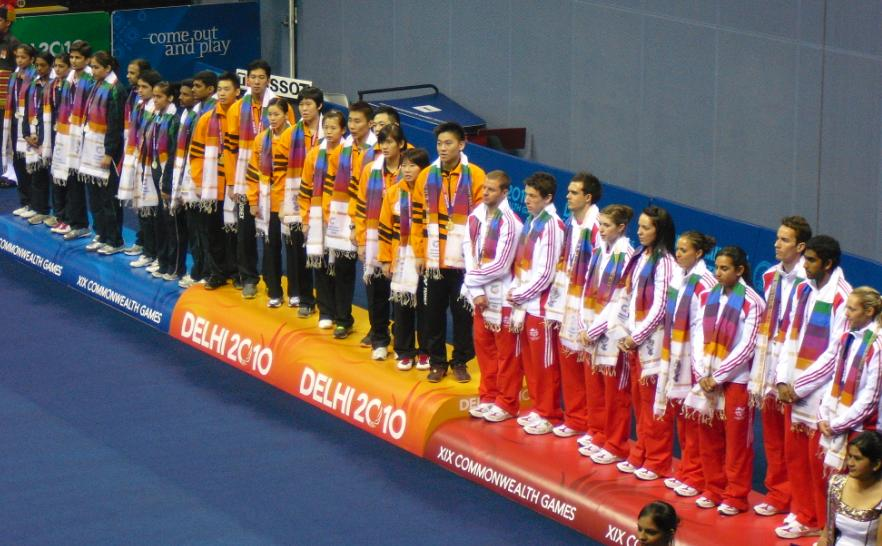
From the left: India (silver), Malaysia (gold), and England (bronze).

Quarterfinals
1	Malaysia	3
8	New Zealand	0
4	Singapore	3
5	Australia	1
3	England	3
6	Scotland	1
2	India	3
7	Canada	0

Semifinals
1	Malaysia	3
4	Singapore	1
3	England	0
2	India	3

Finals
1	Malaysia	3
2	India	1
Third place
4	Singapore	1
3	England	3

=== Bronze Play Off ===
England
3

Singapore
1

			1	2	3
1	(England) (Singapore)	Nathan Robertson / Jenny Wallwork; Chayut Triyachart / Yao Lei	21; 13	21; 15
2	(England) (Singapore)	Rajiv Ouseph; Derek Wong Zi Liang	21; 15	21; 17
3	(England) (Singapore)	Elizabeth Cann; Xing Aiying	14; 21	12; 21
4	(England) (Singapore)	Anthony Clark / Nathan Robertson; Hendra Wijaya / Chayut Triyachart	21; 12	21; 11

=== Final ===
Malaysia
3

India
1

			1	2	3
1	(Malaysia) (India)	Koo Kien Keat / Chin Eei Hui; Valiyaveetil Diju / Jwala Gutta	21; 14	10; 21	21; 10
2	(Malaysia) (India)	Lee Chong Wei; Parupalli Kashyap	21; 18	21; 7
3	(Malaysia) (India)	Wong Mew Choo; Saina Nehwal	26; 24	17; 21	14; 21
4	(Malaysia) (India)	Tan Boon Heong / Koo Kien Keat; Sanave Thomas Arattukulam / Rupesh Kumar K. T.	21; 12	21; 19
