= Nigeria national badminton team =

National badminton team representing Nigeria

Nigeria
- Association: Badminton Federation of Nigeria (BFN)
- Confederation: BCA (Africa)
- President: Francis Orbih

BWF ranking
- Current ranking: 46 ▲17 (2 April 2024)
- Highest ranking: 27 (7 January 2016)

Sudirman Cup
- Appearances: 2 (first in 1999)
- Best result: Group stage

Thomas Cup
- Appearances: 3 (first in 2008)
- Best result: Group stage

African Mixed Team Championships
- Appearances: 16 (first in 1980)
- Best result: Champions (1980, 1982, 1988, 2019)

African Men's Team Championships
- Appearances: 5 (first in 1980)
- Best result: Champions (1980, 1982, 1988)

African Women's Team Championships
- Appearances: 5 (first in 1980)
- Best result: Champions (1982, 1988)

The Nigeria national badminton team represents Nigeria in international badminton team competitions. It is managed by the Badminton Federation of Nigeria, the governing body of badminton in Nigeria. Nigeria was one of the seven African countries that formed the Badminton Confederation of Africa on 31 August 1977. The country first competed in the African Badminton Championships in 1980.

Nigeria made their debut in the Sudirman Cup in 1999. In 2008, the team qualified and competed in the Thomas Cup for the first time after defeating South Africa for the first time in the African qualifiers. The team have yet to qualify for the Uber Cup.

== History ==
=== Men's team ===
Nigeria's men's team first competed in the 1979 WBF World Championships. The team were drawn into Group 2 with Pakistan, Nepal and Ghana. The team lost 5−0 to Pakistan and 3−2 to Nepal in the group stage. In the classification round, the team defeated the Philippines 3−2 to finish in 10th place. In 1980, the team won the men's team event at the 1980 African Badminton Championships in Beira. In 1982, Nigeria hosted the 1982 African Badminton Championships and won their second title in the men's team event. In 1988, the team won their third men's team title at the 1988 African Badminton Championships on home soil. In 1990, the team failed to qualify for the Thomas Cup after losing their matches in the group stage.

In 2008, the team defeated South Africa 3−0 in the final of the African qualifiers and qualified for the Thomas Cup for the first time. In the 2008 Thomas Cup, the team were drawn into Group A with China and Canada. The team placed third in the group after losing 5−0 to both teams. In the wild-card round, the team lost 3−0 to England and failed to enter the quarter-finals.

In 2010, the team qualified for the Thomas Cup for a second time after defeating Mauritius 3−0 in the finals. In the 2010 Thomas Cup, the team were drawn into Group B with Japan and hosts Malaysia. In their first match against the hosts, the team failed to show up to the venue in time due to flight problems. The match was then cancelled and Malaysia were awarded a 5−0 win against Nigeria. In their second match against Japan, the team lost 5−0 and were eliminated in the group stages. In 2012, the team failed to qualify for the 2012 Thomas Cup after losing to South Africa in the final of the African qualifiers.

In 2014, the team qualified for the 2014 Thomas Cup as the highest ranked team in Africa. The team were drawn into Group A with Indonesia, Thailand and Singapore. The team were eliminated after losing 5−0 to Indonesia, Thailand and Singapore. In 2018, the team were runners-up at the African Men's Team Championships, losing 3−2 to Algeria in the final. In 2024, the team entered the finals of the African Men's Team Championships and went head to head against their final opponents from six years ago. The team started off with a 2−0 lead when Victor Ikechukwu and Anuoluwapo Juwon Opeyori defeated Koceila Mammeri and Youcef Sabri Medel in the singles matches respectively. The team however could not convert in the next three matches and lost 3−2 to Algeria.

=== Women's team ===
In 1980, Nigeria finished behind Zimbabwe in the women's team event at the 1980 African Badminton Championships. In 1982, the team won the women's team title at the 1982 African Badminton Championships. In 1988, the team won their third title in the 1988 African Badminton Championships. In 1990 and 1998, the team were eliminated in the group stages of the Uber Cup qualifiers. From 2010 to 2016, the team entered the semi-finals of the Uber Cup African qualifiers but failed to qualify for the Cup tournament.

In 2018, the team lost 3−0 to Mauritius in the final of the 2018 African Women's Team Championships. In 2024, the team entered the semi-finals of the 2024 African Women's Team Championships but lost 3−2 to South Africa.

=== Mixed team ===
Nigeria were back-to-back champions of the mixed team event at the African Badminton Championships in 1980 and 1982. In 1988, Nigeria won the mixed team event again at the African championships since their withdrawal in 1984. In the 1992 African Badminton Championships, the Nigerian team entered the final but refused to play against South Africa who have just returned from suspension. The team were runners-up by default. In 1991, the team withdrew from competing in the 1991 Sudirman Cup. In 1994, the team were bronze medalists at the 1994 African Badminton Championships after losing to South Africa in the semi-finals. The team also competed in the 1994 Commonwealth Games in that same year but were eliminated in the group stages.

In 1999, the team competed in the Sudirman Cup for the first time. The team were drawn into Group 7 with Estonia, Latvia and Argentina. The team defeated Argentina 5−0. The team then defeated Latvia 3−2 but lost to Estonia by the same margin and finished in 48th place. In 2003, the team competed in the All-Africa Games while it was also the host. The team entered the final but lost 3−2 to South Africa. In 2007, the team won the mixed team event at the 2007 All-Africa Games. In 2010, the team competed in the 2010 Commonwealth Games but did not make it past the group stage. In 2011, the team won the All-Africa Games mixed team event for a second time. In 2015, the team competed in the 2015 Sudirman Cup and placed 35th after defeating Kazakhstan in the playoffs.

In April 2019, the team were champions at the 2019 African Mixed Team Championships. In August 2019, the team won their third team title at the African Games. In 2023, the team competed in the 2023 African Mixed Team Championships and were eliminated in the quarter-finals after losing 3−1 to Mauritius.

== Competitive record ==
=== Thomas Cup ===
Year	Round	Pos
1949	Part of the United Kingdom	
1952	Part of the United Kingdom	
1955	Part of the United Kingdom	
1958	Part of the United Kingdom	
1961	Did not enter	
1964	Did not enter	
1967	Did not enter	
1970	Did not enter	
1973	Did not enter	
1976	Did not enter	
1979	Did not enter	
1982	Did not qualify	
1984	Did not qualify	
1986	Withdrew	
1988	Did not enter	
1990	Withdrew	
1992	Did not enter	
1994	Did not enter	
1996	Did not enter	
1998	Did not qualify	
2000	Did not enter	
2002	Did not enter	
2004	Did not qualify	
2006	Did not qualify	
2008	Round of 16	12th
2010	Round of 16	12th
2012	Did not qualify	
2014	Group stage	
2016	Did not enter	
2018	Did not qualify	
2020	Did not enter	
2022	Did not enter	
2024	Did not qualify	
2026	Did not qualify	
2028	To be determined	
2030	To be determined	

=== Uber Cup ===
Year	Round	Pos
1957	Part of the United Kingdom	
1960	Part of the United Kingdom	
1963 to 1981	Did not enter	
1984	Did not qualify	
1986	Did not qualify	
1988	Did not enter	
1990	Did not qualify	
1992	Did not enter	
1994	Did not enter	
1996	Did not enter	
1998	Did not qualify	
2000	Did not enter	
2002	Did not enter	
2004	Did not enter	
2006	Did not enter	
2008	Did not qualify	
2010	Did not qualify	
2012	Did not qualify	
2014	Did not enter	
2016	Did not enter	
2018	Did not qualify	
2020	Did not enter	
2022	Did not enter	
2024	Did not qualify	
2026	Did not qualify	
2028	To be determined	
2030	To be determined	

=== Sudirman Cup ===
Year	Round	Pos
1989 to 1997	Did not enter	
1999	Group stage	48th
2001	Did not enter	
2003	Did not enter	
2005	Did not enter	
2007	Did not enter	
2009	Did not enter	
2011	Did not enter	
2013	Did not enter	
2015	Group stage	33rd
2017	Did not enter	
2019	Did not enter	
2021	Did not enter	
2023	Did not qualify	
2025	Did not qualify	
2027	To be determined	
2029	To be determined	

=== WBF World Championships ===
==== Men's team ====
Year	Round	Pos
1979	Group stage	

==== Women's team ====
Year	Round	Pos
1979	Did not enter	

=== Commonwealth Games ===
==== Men's team ====
Year	Round	Pos
1998	Did not enter	

==== Women's team ====
Year	Round	Pos
1998	Did not enter	

==== Mixed team ====
Year	Round	Pos
1978 to 1990	Did not enter	
1994	Group stage	
2002	Group stage	
2006	Did not enter	
2010	Group stage	
2014	Did not enter	
2018	Did not enter	
2022	Did not enter	
2026	To be determined	

=== African Games ===
==== Mixed team ====
Year	Round	Pos
2003	Runners-up	2nd
2007	Champions	1st
2011	Champions	1st
2015	Semi-finals	3rd
2019	Champions	1st
2027	To be determined	

=== African Team Championships ===
==== Men's team ====
Year	Round	Pos
1979	Did not enter	
1980	Champions	1st
1982	Champions	1st
1984	Did not enter	
1988	Champions	1st
2016	Did not enter	
2018	Runners-up	2nd
2020	Did not enter	
2022	Did not enter	
2024	Runners-up	2nd
2026	Quarter-finals	5th
2028	To be determined	
2030	To be determined	

==== Women's team ====
Year	Round	Pos
1979	Did not enter	
1980	Runners-up	2nd
1982	Champions	1st
1984	Did not enter	
1988	Champions	1st
2016	Did not enter	
2018	Runners-up	2nd
2020	Did not enter	
2022	Did not enter	
2024	Semi-finals	4th
2026	Semi-finals	4th
2028	To be determined	
2030	To be determined	

==== Mixed team ====
Year	Round	Pos
1980	Champions	1st
1982	Champions	1st
1984	Did not enter	
1988	Champions	1st
1992	Runners-up	2nd
1994	Semi-finals	3rd
1998	Did not enter	
2000	Runners-up	2nd
2002	Runners-up	2nd
2004	Runners-up	2nd
2006	Did not enter	
2007	Did not enter	
2009	Group stage	5th
2011	Runners-up	2nd
2013	Runners-up	2nd
2014	Runners-up	2nd
2017	Semi-finals	3rd
2019	Champions	1st
2021	Did not enter	
2023	Quarter-finals	5th
2025	Quarter-finals	5th
2027	To be determined	
2029	To be determined	

**Red border color indicates tournament was held on home soil.

== Junior competitive record ==
=== Suhandinata Cup ===
Year	Round	Pos
2000	Withdrew	
2002	Group stage	18th
2004	Did not enter	
2006	Did not enter	
2007	Did not enter	
2008	Did not enter	
2009	Did not enter	
2010	Did not enter	
2011	Did not enter	
2012	Did not enter	
2013	Did not enter	
2014	Did not enter	
2015	Did not enter	
2016	Did not enter	
2017	Did not enter	
2018	Did not enter	
2019	Did not enter	
2022	Did not enter	
2023	Did not enter	
2024	Did not enter	
2025	Did not enter	
2026	Withdrew	

=== Commonwealth Youth Games ===
==== Mixed team ====
Year	Round	Pos
2004	Did not enter	

=== African Youth Games ===
==== Men's team ====
Year	Round	Pos
2018	Champions	1st

==== Women's team ====
Year	Round	Pos
2018	Semi-finals	3rd

==== Mixed team ====
Year	Round	Pos
2014	Champions	1st

=== African Junior Team Championships ===
==== Mixed team ====
Year	Round	Pos
1979	Did not enter	
1980	Champions	1st
1982	Champions	1st
1984	Did not enter	
1988	Champions	1st
1993	Runners-up	2nd
1995	Runners-up	2nd
1997	Third place	3rd
1999	Champions	1st
2001	Runners-up	2nd
2003	Withdrew	
2005	Champions	1st
2007	Did not enter	
2009	Did not enter	
2011	Did not enter	
2013	Runners-up	2nd
2016	Did not enter	
2021	Did not enter	
2022	Did not enter	
2024	To be determined	

**Red border color indicates tournament was held on home soil.

== Players ==
=== Current squad ===
As of 2 January 2024

==== Men's team ====
Name	DoB/Age	Ranking of event		
Name	DoB/Age	MS	MD	XD
Anuoluwapo Juwon Opeyori	1 June 1997 (age 29)	121	534	-
Emmanuel Olusegun Ogunsanwo	13 September 1999 (age 27)	563	304	-
Joseph Abel	5 January 2003 (age 23)	974	304	-
Joseph Emmanuel Emmy	30 October 2004 (age 21)	609	295	-
Victor Ikechukwu	28 May 1998 (age 28)	691	295	-
Saddam Sidi Rufai	25 September 2003 (age 23)	1134	304	-
Khalil Safana Shamsuddeen	28 September 2003 (age 23)	609	304	-
Godwin Olofua	18 April 1999 (age 27)	442	505	-
David Oluwasegun Ogunsanwo	15 October 2001 (age 24)	694	505	-
Yunusa Momoh	15 April 1997 (age 29)	-	362	516

==== Women's team ====
Name	DoB/Age	Ranking of event		
Name	DoB/Age	WS	WD	XD
Grace Gabriel	25 June 1988 (age 38)	243	210	516
Chineye Ibere	4 November 1995 (age 30)	340	357	-
Naomi Tanko	28 February 1996 (age 30)	470	-	-
Zainab Damilola Alabi	16 October 2002 (age 23)	465	457	-
Ramatu Yakubu	27 March 1999 (age 27)	-	210	271
Uchechukwu Deborah Ukeh	12 November 1996 (age 29)	586	357	-
Sofiat Arinola Obanishola	16 September 2003 (age 23)	586	457	-
Dorcas Ajoke Adesokan	5 July 1998 (age 28)	-	457	-
Aminat Oluwafunke Ilori	25 November 2000 (age 25)	1029	457	-
Umar Maryam	25 November 1996 (age 29)	-	-	426

=== Previous squads ===
==== Thomas Cup ====
- 2008, 2010, 2014
