= Badminton at the 2007 All-Africa Games – Mixed team =

Badminton – Mixed team at the 2007 All-Africa Games
- Venue: Salle OMS El Biar
- Dates: 13 – 15 July 2007

Medalists
gold medal	Nigeria
silver medal	South Africa
bronze medal	Seychelles
bronze medal	Algeria

The mixed team badminton event at the 2007 All-Africa Games was held from 13 to 15 July at the Salle OMS El Biar in El Biar, Algiers.

== Schedule ==
All times based on West Africa Time (UTC+01:00)

Date	Time	Event
Friday, 13 July 2007	09:00	Group stage
Friday, 13 July 2007	16:00	Group stage
Saturday, 14 July 2007	09:00	Group stage
Saturday, 14 July 2007	16:00	Group stage
Sunday, 15 July 2007	09:00	Semi-finals
Sunday, 15 July 2007	16:00	Gold medal match

== Competition format ==
Nine teams were drawn into groups of two. The top two performing teams in each group advance to the knockout stage. Each tie consists of five matches, one for each discipline (men's / women's singles, men's / women's / mixed doubles). In the knockout stage, the winner of each group will face the runner-up of the opposite group.

== Group stage ==
=== Group A ===
Team	Pld	W	L	MF	MA	MD	Pts
Seychelles	3	3	0	13	2	+13	3
Algeria	3	2	1	9	5	+4	2
Egypt	3	1	2	8	7	−1	1
Ghana	3	0	3	0	15	−15	0

Seychelles	4–1	Algeria
Seychelles	4–1	Egypt
Seychelles	5–0	Ghana
Algeria	3–2	Egypt
Algeria	5–0	Ghana
Egypt	5–0	Ghana

=== Group B ===
Team	Pld	W	L	MF	MA	MD	Pts
Nigeria	4	4	0	18	2	+16	4
South Africa	4	3	1	17	3	+14	3
Mauritius	4	2	2	9	11	−2	2
Uganda	4	1	3	5	15	−10	1
Ethiopia	4	0	4	1	19	−18	0

Nigeria	3–2	South Africa
Nigeria	5–0	Mauritius
Nigeria	5–0	Uganda
Nigeria	5–0	Ethiopia
South Africa	5–0	Mauritius
South Africa	5–0	Uganda
South Africa	5–0	Ethiopia
Mauritius	4–1	Uganda
Mauritius	5–0	Ethiopia
Uganda	4–1	Ethiopia

== Knockout stage ==
Semi-finals
A1	Seychelles	2
B2	South Africa	3
A2	Algeria	0
B1	Nigeria	3

Gold medal match
B2	South Africa	0
B1	Nigeria	3

=== Semi-finals ===
South Africa
3
Salle OMS El Biar
15 July 2007, 09:00 UTC+1

Seychelles
2

			1	2	3
1	(South Africa) (Seychelles)	Dorian James / Michelle Edwards; Georgie Cupidon / Juliette Ah-Wan	18; 21	13; 21
2	(South Africa) (Seychelles)	Chris Dednam; Steve Malcouzanne	10; 21	21; 17	21; 15
3	(South Africa) (Seychelles)	Stacey Doubell; Juliette Ah-Wan	17; 21	16; 21
4	(South Africa) (Seychelles)	Chris Dednam / Roelof Dednam; Georgie Cupidon / Steve Malcouzanne	16; 21	21; 19	21; 19
5	(South Africa) (Seychelles)	Chantal Botts / Michelle Edwards; Cynthia Course / Catherina Paulin	21; 11	21; 13

Nigeria
3
Salle OMS El Biar
15 July 2007, 09:00 UTC+1

Algeria
0

			1	2	3
1	(Nigeria) (Algeria)	Greg Okuonghae / Grace Daniel; Karim Rezig / Malika Menaceri	21; 11	21; 12
2	(Nigeria) (Algeria)	Ocholi Edicha; Nabil Lasmari	21; 17	22; 20
3	(Nigeria) (Algeria)	Grace Daniel; Anya Boudaoui	21; 10	21; 13
4	(Nigeria) (Algeria)	Ibrahim Adamu / Greg Okuonghae; Zeradine Ammar / Karim Rezig				not played
5	(Nigeria) (Algeria)	Grace Daniel / Susan Ideh; Cherifi Hakima / Malika Menaceri				not played

=== Gold medal match ===
South Africa
0
Salle OMS El Biar
15 July 2007, 16:00 UTC+1

Nigeria
3

			1	2	3
1	(South Africa) (Nigeria)	Stacey Doubell; Grace Daniel	15; 21	16; 21
2	(South Africa) (Nigeria)	Willem Viljoen; Jinkan Ifraimu	14; 21	21; 15	18; 21
3	(South Africa) (Nigeria)	Chantal Botts / Michelle Edwards; Grace Daniel / Susan Ideh	16; 21	18; 21
4	(South Africa) (Nigeria)	Chris Dednam / Roelof Dednam; Ibrahim Adamu / Greg Okuonghae
5	(South Africa) (Nigeria)	Roelof Dednam / Michelle Edwards; Greg Okuonghae / Susan Ideh				not played
