= 1988 African Badminton Championships =

Tournament details
- Dates: 7–13 August
- Edition: 5th
- Venue: National Stadium
- Location: Lagos, Nigeria

The 1988 African Badminton Championships was a continental stage tournament to crown the best badminton squads and players in Africa. The tournament took place from 7 to 13 August 1988 at the National Stadium in Lagos, Nigeria.

== Background ==
In June 1986, the Badminton Confederation of Africa held a press conference to discuss the host for the next tournament. Zambia was then chosen to host the next championships in 1986. However, Zambia then postponed and later withdrew from hosting the event due to economic recession. Mozambique then bid to host the event but was unsuccessful. In 1988, Nigeria were selected to host the event. The event was sponsored by African Petroleum Ltd. with a budget of ₦100,000.

The participating teams were soon reduced from five teams to three teams, which were Nigeria, Tanzania and Mauritius. Ghana only sent their women's singles ace, Nelly Akainyah to compete in the championships. Benin and Togo sent observers to the tournament.

The Nigerian team dominated the championships, winning gold in every discipline. Tanzania won four silvers in the team events and a silver in the individual event, which came from men's doubles. Debutants Mauritius won a silver medal in mixed doubles.

== Medalists ==
=== Individual events ===
Event	Gold	Silver	Bronze
Men's singles	(Nigeria) Tamuno Gibson	(Nigeria) Babatunde Badiru	(Tanzania) Shahnawaz Kayumali
Men's singles	(Nigeria) Tamuno Gibson	(Nigeria) Babatunde Badiru	(Tanzania) Nassor Juma
Women's singles	(Nigeria) Oby Edoga	(Nigeria) Dayo Oyewusi	(Mauritius) Cathy Foo Kune
Women's singles	(Nigeria) Oby Edoga	(Nigeria) Dayo Oyewusi	(Nigeria) Y. Oni
Men's doubles	(Nigeria) Tamuno Gibson (Nigeria) Fatai Tokosi	(Tanzania) Mohamed Juma (Tanzania) Nassor Juma	(Tanzania) Mselem Juma (Tanzania) Shahnawaz Kayumali
Men's doubles	(Nigeria) Tamuno Gibson (Nigeria) Fatai Tokosi	(Tanzania) Mohamed Juma (Tanzania) Nassor Juma	(Mauritius) Geenesh Dussain (Mauritius) Jean-Michel Duverge
Women's doubles	(Nigeria) Oby Edoga (Nigeria) Dayo Oyewusi	(Nigeria) C. Olua (Nigeria) Y. Oni	(Tanzania) Nasra Juma (Tanzania) Sharifa Juma
Women's doubles	(Nigeria) Oby Edoga (Nigeria) Dayo Oyewusi	(Nigeria) C. Olua (Nigeria) Y. Oni	(Mauritius) Vandanah Seesurun (Mauritius) Martine de Souza
Mixed doubles	(Nigeria) Tamuno Gibson (Nigeria) Oby Edoga	(Mauritius) Jacques Foo Kune (Mauritius) Cathy Foo Kune	(Tanzania) Mohamed Juma (Tanzania) Nasra Juma
Mixed doubles	(Nigeria) Tamuno Gibson (Nigeria) Oby Edoga	(Mauritius) Jacques Foo Kune (Mauritius) Cathy Foo Kune	(Mauritius) Jean-Michel Duverge (Mauritius) Martine de Souza

=== Team events ===
Event	Gold	Silver	Bronze
Men's team	Nigeria	Tanzania	Mauritius
Women's team	Nigeria	Tanzania	Mauritius
Mixed team	Nigeria	Tanzania	Mauritius
Junior mixed team	Nigeria	Tanzania	Mauritius

=== Medal table ===
* Host nation (Nigeria)

Rank	Nation	Gold	Silver	Bronze	Total
1	Nigeria*	9	3	1	13
2	Tanzania	0	5	5	10
3	Mauritius	0	1	8	9
Totals (3 entries)		9	9	14	32
