= Badminton at the 2003 All-Africa Games – Mixed team =

Badminton – Mixed team at the 2003 All-Africa Games
- Venue: Indoor Sports Halls National Stadium
- Dates: 5 – 8 October 2003

Medalists
gold medal	South Africa
silver medal	Nigeria
bronze medal	Seychelles
bronze medal	Mauritius

The mixed team badminton event at the 2003 All-Africa Games was held from 5 to 8 October at the Indoor Sports Halls National Stadium in Abuja.

== Schedule ==
All times based on West Africa Time (UTC+01:00)

Date	Time	Event
Sunday, 5 October 2003	14:00	Group stage
Monday, 6 October 2003	14:00	Group stage
Tuesday, 7 October 2003	14:00	Semi-finals
Wednesday, 8 October 2003	14:00	Gold medal match

== Competition format ==
Six teams were drawn into groups of two. The top two performing teams in each group advance to the knockout stage. Each tie consists of five matches, one for each discipline (men's / women's singles, men's / women's / mixed doubles). In the knockout stage, the winner of each group will face the runner-up of the opposite group.

== Group stage ==
=== Group A ===
Pos	Team	Pld	W	L	MF	MA	MD	GF	GA	GD	PF	PA	PD	Pts	Qualification
1	South Africa	2	2	0	9	1	+8	18	2	+16	265	127	+138	2	Knockout stage
2	Mauritius	2	1	1	6	4	+2	12	8	+4	227	179	+48	1	Knockout stage
3	Egypt	2	0	2	0	10	−10	0	20	−20	98	284	−186	0	

Source: AllAfrica

South Africa
5
Indoor Sports Halls National Stadium
5 October 2003, 14:00 UTC+1

Egypt
0

			1	2	3
1	(South Africa) (Egypt)	Chris Dednam / Antoinette Uys; Kareem Shedeed / Alaa Youssef	15; 2	15; 3
2	(South Africa) (Egypt)	Stewart Carson; Kareem Shedeed	15; 5	15; 7
3	(South Africa) (Egypt)	Michelle Edwards; Hadia Hosny	11; 3	11; 3
4	(South Africa) (Egypt)	Chris Dednam / Johan Kleingeld; Yehya Aldel Kader / Tamar Raafat	15; 5	15; 2
5	(South Africa) (Egypt)	Marika Daubern / Antoinette Uys; Dina Nagy / Sandy Nagy	15; 4	15; 8

Mauritius
5
Indoor Sports Halls National Stadium
5 October 2003, 14:00 UTC+1

Egypt
0

			1	2	3
1	(Mauritius) (Egypt)	Stephan Beeharry / Shama Aboobakar; Kareem Shedeed / Alaa Youssef	15; 5	15; 7
2	(Mauritius) (Egypt)	Édouard Clarisse; Kareem Shedeed	15; 2	15; 5
3	(Mauritius) (Egypt)	Amrita Sawaram; Hadia Hosny	11; 7	11; 4
4	(Mauritius) (Egypt)	Stephan Beeharry / Édouard Clarisse; Yehya Aldel Kader / Tamar Raafat	15; 9	15; 6
5	(Mauritius) (Egypt)	Marika Daubern / Antoinette Uys; Hadia Hosny / Alaa Youssef	15; 3	15; 8

South Africa
4
Indoor Sports Halls National Stadium
6 October 2003, 14:00 UTC+1

Mauritius
1

			1	2	3
1	(South Africa) (Mauritius)	Chris Dednam / Antoinette Uys; Stephan Beeharry / Shama Aboobakar	15; 9	15; 9
2	(South Africa) (Mauritius)	Stewart Carson; Édouard Clarisse	6; 15	3; 15
3	(South Africa) (Mauritius)	Michelle Edwards; Amrita Sawaram	11; 2	11; 4
4	(South Africa) (Mauritius)	Chris Dednam / Johan Kleingeld; Stephan Beeharry / Édouard Clarisse	17; 16	15; 3
5	(South Africa) (Mauritius)	Chantal Botts / Michelle Edwards; Shama Aboobakar / Anusha Dajee	15; 10	15; 2

=== Group B ===
Pos	Team	Pld	W	L	MF	MA	MD	GF	GA	GD	PF	PA	PD	Pts	Qualification
1	Nigeria (H)	2	2	0	10	0	+10	20	1	+19	296	106	+190	2	Knockout stage
2	Seychelles	2	1	1	5	5	0	11	10	+1	225	191	+34	1	Knockout stage
3	Kenya	2	0	2	0	10	−10	0	20	−20	60	284	−224	0	

Source: AllAfrica
(H) Host

Nigeria
5
Indoor Sports Halls National Stadium
5 October 2003, 14:00 UTC+1

Kenya
0

			1	2	3
1	(Nigeria) (Kenya)	Abimbola Odejoke / Susan Ideh; Fred Gituku / Rose Wanjala	15; 3	15; 2
2	(Nigeria) (Kenya)	Ola Fagbemi; Fred Gituku	15; 2	15; 1
3	(Nigeria) (Kenya)	Grace Daniel; Irene Kerimah	11; 2	11; 2
4	(Nigeria) (Kenya)	Abimbola Odejoke / Dotun Akinsanya; Fred Gituku / Victor Odera	15; 3	15; 1
5	(Nigeria) (Kenya)	Prisca Azuine / Kuburat Mumuni; Anjali Gudhka / Rose Wanjala	15; 2	15; 5

Seychelles
5
Indoor Sports Halls National Stadium
5 October 2003, 14:00 UTC+1

Kenya
0

			1	2	3
1	(Seychelles) (Kenya)	Georgie Cupidon / Juliette Ah-Wan; Fred Gituku / Rose Wanjala	15; 4	15; 2
2	(Seychelles) (Kenya)	Nicholas Jumaye; Victor Odera	15; 8	15; 3
3	(Seychelles) (Kenya)	Catherina Paulin; Anjali Gudhka	11; 2	11; 1
4	(Seychelles) (Kenya)	Georgie Cupidon / Steve Malcouzanne; Fred Gituku / Victor Odera	15; 2	15; 6
5	(Seychelles) (Kenya)	Juliette Ah-Wan / Shirley Etienne; Anjali Gudhka / Rose Wanjala	15; 5	15; 4

Nigeria
5
Indoor Sports Halls National Stadium
6 October 2003, 14:00 UTC+1

Seychelles
0

			1	2	3
1	(Nigeria) (Seychelles)	Abimbola Odejoke / Susan Ideh; Georgie Cupidon / Juliette Ah-Wan	15; 11	15; 5
2	(Nigeria) (Seychelles)	Ocholi Edicha; Nicholas Jumaye	15; 4	15; 5
3	(Nigeria) (Seychelles)	Grace Daniel; Juliette Ah-Wan	11; 9	11; 8
4	(Nigeria) (Seychelles)	Ibrahim Adamu / Greg Okuonghae; Georgie Cupidon / Steve Malcouzanne	15; 2	15; 7
5	(Nigeria) (Seychelles)	Prisca Azuine / Kuburat Mumuni; Juliette Ah-Wan / Shirley Etienne	15; 8	12; 15	15; 9

== Knockout stage ==
Semi-finals
A1	South Africa	3
B2	Seychelles	0
A2	Mauritius	0
B1	Nigeria	3

Gold medal match
A1	South Africa	3
B1	Nigeria	2

=== Semi-finals ===
South Africa
3
Indoor Sports Halls National Stadium
7 October 2003, 14:00 UTC+1

Seychelles
0

			1	2	3
1	(South Africa) (Seychelles)	Chris Dednam / Antoinette Uys; Georgie Cupidon / Juliette Ah-Wan	15; 4	15; 5
2	(South Africa) (Seychelles)	Stewart Carson; Nicholas Jumaye	15; 7	15; 8
3	(South Africa) (Seychelles)	Chris Dednam / Johan Kleingeld; Georgie Cupidon / Steve Malcouzanne	15; 8	15; 10
4	(South Africa) (Seychelles)	Michelle Edwards; Juliette Ah-Wan				not played
5	(South Africa) (Seychelles)	Chantal Botts / Michelle Edwards; Shirley Etienne / Catherina Paulin				not played

Nigeria
3
Indoor Sports Halls National Stadium
7 October 2003, 14:00 UTC+1

Mauritius
0

			1	2	3
1	(Nigeria) (Mauritius)	Greg Okuonghae / Grace Daniel; Stephan Beeharry / Shama Aboobakar	15; 7	15; 7
2	(Nigeria) (Mauritius)	Ola Fagbemi; Hyder Aboobakar	15; 3	15; 5
3	(Nigeria) (Mauritius)	Abimbola Odejoke / Dotun Akinsanya; Édouard Clarisse / Stephan Beeharry	15; 5	15; 9
4	(Nigeria) (Mauritius)	Grace Daniel; Amrita Sawaram				not played
5	(Nigeria) (Mauritius)	Prisca Azuine / Kuburat Mumuni; Shama Aboobakar / Anusha Dajee				not played

=== Gold medal match ===
South Africa
3
Indoor Sports Halls National Stadium
8 October 2003, 14:00 UTC+1

Nigeria
2

			1	2	3
1	(South Africa) (Nigeria)	Chris Dednam / Johan Kleingeld; Ibrahim Adamu / Greg Okuonghae	11; 15	9; 15
2	(South Africa) (Nigeria)	Stewart Carson; Ocholi Edicha	6; 15	11; 15
3	(South Africa) (Nigeria)	Chantal Botts / Michelle Edwards; Grace Daniel / Susan Ideh	15; 7	15; 9
4	(South Africa) (Nigeria)	Michelle Edwards; Grace Daniel	5; 11	11; 5	11; 4
5	(South Africa) (Nigeria)	Chris Dednam / Antoinette Uys; Abimbola Odejoke / Susan Ideh	6; 15	15; 11	17; 16
