= Dorian James =

South African badminton player

Personal information
- Born: Dorian Lance James; 19 June 1981 (age 45) Cape Town, Western Cape, South Africa
- Height: 1.69 m (5 ft 7 in)
- Weight: 87 kg (192 lb)

Sport
- Country: South Africa
- Sport: Badminton

Men's & mixed doubles
- Highest ranking: 46 (MD 7 June 2012); 51 (XD 14 July 2011)
- BWF profile
Medal record
Men's badminton
Representing South Africa
All-Africa Games
Silver medal – second place	2011 Maputo	Men's doubles
Silver medal – second place	2011 Maputo	Mixed team
Silver medal – second place	2007 Algiers	Men's doubles
Silver medal – second place	2007 Algiers	Mixed team
African Championships
Gold medal – first place	2012 Addis Ababa	Men's doubles
Gold medal – first place	2012 Addis Ababa	Mixed doubles
Gold medal – first place	2011 Marrakesh	Men's doubles
Gold medal – first place	2011 Marrakesh	Mixed team
Gold medal – first place	2010 Kampala	Mixed doubles
Gold medal – first place	2009 Nairobi	Mixed team
Gold medal – first place	2006 Algiers	Mixed team
Gold medal – first place	2004 Rose Hill	Mixed team
Gold medal – first place	2002 Casablanca	Mixed team
Silver medal – second place	2011 Marrakesh	Mixed doubles
Silver medal – second place	2009 Nairobi	Men's doubles
Silver medal – second place	2006 Algiers	Men's doubles
Silver medal – second place	2006 Algiers	Mixed doubles
Bronze medal – third place	2010 Kampala	Men's doubles
Bronze medal – third place	2009 Nairobi	Mixed doubles
Bronze medal – third place	2004 Rose Hill	Men's doubles
Bronze medal – third place	2004 Rose Hill	Mixed doubles
Bronze medal – third place	2002 Casablanca	Mixed doubles
Africa Team Championships
Gold medal – first place	2012 Addis Ababa	Men's team
Gold medal – first place	2006 Rose Hill	Men's team
Silver medal – second place	2008 Rose Hill	Men's team
Bronze medal – third place	2010 Kampala	Men's team

Dorian Lance James (born 19 June 1981) is a male badminton player from South Africa.

James competed in badminton at the 2004 Summer Olympics in men's doubles with partner Stewart Carson. They were defeated in the round of 32 by Howard Bach and Kevin Han of the United States.

At the 2012 Summer Olympics, he competed with Willem Viljoen in the men's doubles event. They did not progress beyond the group stages.

== Achievements ==
=== All African Games ===
Men's doubles
Year	Venue	Partner	Opponent	Score	Result
2011	Escola Josina Machel, Maputo, Mozambique	(South Africa) Willem Viljoen	(Nigeria) Ola Fagbemi (Nigeria) Jinkan Ifraimu	18–21, 19–21	Silver
2007	Salle OMS El Biar, Algiers, Algeria	(South Africa) Willem Viljoen	(South Africa) Chris Dednam (South Africa) Roelof Dednam	10–21, 15–21	Silver

=== African Championships ===
Men's doubles
Year	Venue	Partner	Opponent	Score	Result
2012	Arat Kilo Hall, Addis Ababa, Ethiopia	(South Africa) Willem Viljoen	(Nigeria) Ola Fagbemi (Nigeria) Jinkan Ifraimu	21–15, 21–15	Gold
2011	Marrakesh, Morocco	(South Africa) Willem Viljoen	(Nigeria) Ola Fagbemi (Nigeria) Jinkan Ifraimu	21–18, 21–14	Gold
2010	Kampala, Uganda	(South Africa) Willem Viljoen	(Nigeria) Ola Fagbemi (Nigeria) Jinkan Ifraimu	15–21, 15–21	Bronze
2009	Nairobi, Kenya	(South Africa) Chris Dednam	(Nigeria) Ola Fagbemi (Nigeria) Jinkan Ifraimu	13–21, 14–21	Silver
2006	Algiers, Algeria	(South Africa) Willem Viljoen	(South Africa) Chris Dednam (South Africa) Roelof Dednam		Silver
2004	Rose Hill, Mauritius	(South Africa) Stewart Carson	(Nigeria) Dotun Akinsanya (Nigeria) Abimbola Odejoke	7–15, 15–10, 5–15	Bronze

Mixed doubles
Year	Venue	Partner	Opponent	Score	Result
2012	Arat Kilo Hall, Addis Ababa, Ethiopia	(South Africa) Michelle Edwards	(South Africa) Enrico James (South Africa) Stacey Doubel	21–16, 21–6	Gold
2011	Marrakesh, Morocco	(South Africa) Michelle Edwards	(South Africa) Willem Viljoen (South Africa) Annari Viljoen	13–21, 12–21	Silver
2010	Kampala, Uganda	(South Africa) Michelle Edwards	(South Africa) Roeloff Dednam (South Africa) Annari Viljoen	21–13, 21–14	Gold
2009	Nairobi, Kenya	(South Africa) Stacey Doubell	(Seychelles) Georgie Cupidon (Seychelles) Juliette Ah-Wan	13–21, 14–21	Bronze
2006	Algiers, Algeria	(South Africa) Michelle Edwards	(Seychelles) Georgie Cupidon (Seychelles) Juliette Ah-Wan	16–21, 21–17, 16–21	Silver
2004	Rose Hill, Mauritius	(South Africa) Michelle Edwards	(Nigeria) Orobosa Okuonghae (Nigeria) Grace Daniel	15–6, 9–15, 8–15	Bronze
2002	Casablanca, Morocco	(South Africa) Michelle Edwards	(South Africa) Johan Kleingeld (South Africa) Chantal Botts	4–7, 4–7, 4–7	Bronze

=== BWF International Challenge/Series (19 titles, 12 runners-up) ===
Men's doubles
Year	Tournament	Partner	Opponent	Score	Result
2002	South Africa International	(South Africa) Stewart Carson	(South Africa) Chris Dednam (South Africa) Johan Kleingeld	7–5, 0–7, 5–7	(silver) Runner-up
2006	Mauritius International	(South Africa) Willem Viljoen	(South Africa) Chris Dednam (South Africa) Roelof Dednam	21–13, 23–21	(gold) Winner
2007	South Africa International	(South Africa) Willem Viljoen	(South Africa) Chris Dednam (South Africa) Roelof Dednam	21–12, 21–18	(gold) Winner
2008	South Africa International	(South Africa) Willem Viljoen	(South Africa) Chris Dednam (South Africa) Roelof Dednam	21–16, 21–17	(gold) Winner
2009	Kenya International	(South Africa) Chris Dednam	(Nigeria) Ola Fagbemi (Nigeria) Jinkan Ifraimu	21–14, 21–13	(gold) Winner
2009	Mauritius International	(South Africa) Willem Viljoen	(Nigeria) Ola Fagbemi (Nigeria) Jinkan Ifraimu	19–21, 22–20, 21–8	(gold) Winner
2009	South Africa International	(South Africa) Willem Viljoen	(Iran) Mohammadreza Kheradmani (Iran) Ali Shahhosseini	22–20, 17–21, 21–15	(gold) Winner
2010	Uganda International	(South Africa) Willem Viljoen	(Nigeria) Ola Fagbemi (Nigeria) Jinkan Ifraimu	21–13, 21–9	(gold) Winner
2010	Kenya International	(South Africa) Willem Viljoen	(Nigeria) Ola Fagbemi (Nigeria) Jinkan Ifraimu	22–20, 21–17	(gold) Winner
2010	South Africa International	(South Africa) Willem Viljoen	(South Africa) Chris Dednam (South Africa) Roelof Dednam	14–21, 18–21	(silver) Runner-up
2010	Botswana International	(South Africa) Willem Viljoen	(South Africa) Enrico James (South Africa) Jacobs Maliekal	21–19, 21–10	(gold) Winner
2011	Mauritius International	(South Africa) Willem Viljoen	(India) Manu Attri (India) Jishnu Sanyal	19–21, 9–21	(silver) Runner-up
2011	Kenya International	(South Africa) Willem Viljoen	(India) Manu Attri (India) Jishnu Sanyal	14–21, 13–21	(silver) Runner-up
2011	Namibia International	(South Africa) Willem Viljoen	(Egypt) Ali Ahmed El-Khateeb (Egypt) Abdelrahman Kashkal	21–13, 21–13	(gold) Winner
2011	Botswana International	(South Africa) Willem Viljoen	(Nigeria) Ola Fagbemi (Nigeria) Jinkan Ifraimu	21–23, 21–13, 15–21	(silver) Runner-up
2011	South Africa International	(South Africa) Willem Viljoen	(South Africa) Chris Dednam (South Africa) Enrico James	21–19, 21–18	(gold) Winner
2012	Uganda International	(South Africa) Willem Viljoen	(Nigeria) Ola Fagbemi (Nigeria) Jinkan Ifraimu	24–22, 21–19	(gold) Winner
2012	South Africa International	(South Africa) Enrico James	(South Africa) Andries Malan (South Africa) Willem Viljoen	22–24, 21–15, 22–24	(silver) Runner-up
2024	South Africa International	(South Africa) Robert Summers	(Malta) Matthew Abela (Israel) Maxim Grinblat	21–10, 19–21, 20–22	(silver) Runner-up

Mixed doubles
Year	Tournament	Partner	Opponent	Score	Result
2005	South Africa International	(South Africa) Michelle Edwards	(Nigeria) Orobosa Okuonghae (Nigeria) Grace Daniel	13–15, 15–12, 15–13	(gold) Winner
2008	Mauritius International	(South Africa) Michelle Edwards	(South Africa) Chris Dednam (South Africa) Annari Viljoen	21–16, 15–21, 21–11	(gold) Winner
2009	South Africa International	(South Africa) Michelle Edwards	(South Africa) Willem Viljoen (South Africa) Jade Morgan	21–11, 21–17	(gold) Winner
2009	Kenya International	(South Africa) Annari Viljoen	(South Africa) Chris Dednam (South Africa) Michelle Edwards	11–21, 13–21	(silver) Runner-up
2010	Uganda International	(South Africa) Michelle Edwards	(Greece) Georgios Charalambidis (Greece) Anne Hald Jensen	14–21, 21–19, 21–7	(gold) Winner
2010	South Africa International	(South Africa) Michelle Edwards	(South Africa) Chris Dednam (South Africa) Annari Viljoen	21–14, 10–21, 13–21	(silver) Runner-up
2010	Botswana International	(South Africa) Michelle Edwards	(South Africa) Enrico James (South Africa) Stacey Doubell	21–19, 21–11	(gold) Winner
2011	Mauritius International	(South Africa) Michelle Edwards	(Egypt) Abdelrahman Kashkal (Egypt) Hadia Hosny	21–16, 21–11	(gold) Winner
2011	Kenya International	(South Africa) Michelle Edwards	(Vietnam) Lê Hà Anh (Vietnam) Lê Thu Huyền	25–23, 14–21, 19–21	(silver) Runner-up
2011	Botswana International	(South Africa) Michelle Edwards	(Nigeria) Olaoluwa Fagbemi (Nigeria) Susan Funaya Ideh	21–16, 11–21, 21–19	(gold) Winner
2012	Uganda International	(South Africa) Michelle Edwards	(South Africa) Willem Viljoen (South Africa) Annari Viljoen	7–21, 10–21	(silver) Runner-up
2012	South Africa International	(South Africa) Michelle Edwards	(South Africa) Willem Viljoen (South Africa) Annari Viljoen	15–21, 21–16, 12–21	(silver) Runner-up

BWF International Challenge tournament
BWF International Series tournament
BWF Future Series tournament
