= Stephan Beeharry =

Mauritian badminton player

Personal information
- Born: Jacques Michel Stephan Beeharry; 19 April 1975 (age 51) Rose Hill, Mauritius
- Height: 1.85 m (6 ft 1 in)
- Weight: 70 kg (154 lb)

Sport
- Country: Mauritius
- Sport: Badminton
- Handedness: Right

Men's singles & doubles
- Highest ranking: 293 (MS 25 March 2010); 298 (MD 8 July 2010); 216 (XD 26 August 2010)
- BWF profile
Medal record
Men's badminton
Representing Mauritius
All-Africa Games
Bronze medal – third place	2003 Abuja	Men's singles
Bronze medal – third place	2003 Abuja	Men's doubles
Bronze medal – third place	2003 Abuja	Mixed team
African Championships
Gold medal – first place	2002 Casablanca	Men's doubles
Silver medal – second place	2004 Rose Hill	Mixed doubles
Bronze medal – third place	2010 Kampala	Mixed doubles
Bronze medal – third place	2007 Rose Hill	Men's doubles
Bronze medal – third place	2007 Rose Hill	Mixed doubles
Bronze medal – third place	2007 Rose Hill	Mixed team
Bronze medal – third place	2004 Rose Hill	Men's doubles
Bronze medal – third place	2002 Casablanca	Mixed team
Bronze medal – third place	1998 Rose Hill	Men's doubles
Bronze medal – third place	1998 Rose Hill	Mixed doubles
Africa Team Championships
Silver medal – second place	2010 Kampala	Men's team
Silver medal – second place	2006 Rose Hill	Men's team
Bronze medal – third place	2012 Addis Ababa	Men's team
Bronze medal – third place	2008 Rose Hill	Men's team

Jacques Michel Stephan Beeharry (born 19 April 1975) is a Mauritian badminton player and coach. He competed at the 1996 and 2000 Summer Olympics, also at the 1998, 2002, 2006 and 2010 Commonwealth Games. Beeharry was the bronze medalists at the 2003 All-Africa Games in the men's singles, doubles, and team events.

== Career overview ==
=== Olympic Games ===
At the 1996 Summer Olympics, he competed in men's singles event and defeated by Fumihiko Machida of Japan in the first round with the score 15-11, 15-5. In men's doubles event, he was partnered with Eddy Clarisse and defeated by Peter Blackburn and Paul Straight of Australia in the first round with the score 15-3, 15-7. In mixed doubles event, he was partnered with Martine de Souza and defeated by Jens Eriksen and Helene Kirkegaard of Denmark in the first round with the score 15-6, 15-8. At the 2000 Summer Olympics, he competed in mixed doubles event partnered with Marie-Helene Valerie-Pierre and defeated by the Canadian pairs Mike Beres and Kara Solmundson in the first round with the score 15-2, 15-6.

== Personal life ==
Beeharry is now works as a lecturer of physical education in Collège du Saint-Esprit.

== Achievements ==
=== All-Africa Games ===
Men's singles
Year	Venue	Opponent	Score	Result
2003	Indoor Sports Halls National Stadium; Abuja, Nigeria	(Nigeria) Ola Fagbemi	10–15, 8–15	Bronze

Men's doubles
Year	Venue	Partner	Opponent	Score	Result
2003	Indoor Sports Halls National Stadium; Abuja, Nigeria	(Mauritius) Eddy Clarisse	(Nigeria) Abimbola Odejoke (Nigeria) Dotun Akinsanya	–, –, –	Bronze

=== African Championships ===
Men's doubles
Year	Venue	Partner	Opponent	Score	Result
2007	Stadium Badminton Rose Hill; Rose Hill, Mauritius	(Mauritius) Vishal Sawaram	(South Africa) Chris Dednam (South Africa) Roelof Dednam	12–21, 9–21	Bronze
2004	National Badminton Centre; Rose Hill, Mauritius	(Mauritius) Yogeshsingh Mahadnac	(South Africa) Chris Dednam (South Africa) Johan Kleingeld	15–17, 15–13, 1–15	Bronze
2002	Casablanca, Morocco	(Mauritius) Denis Constantin	(South Africa) Chris Dednam (South Africa) Johan Kleingeld		Gold
1998	Rose Hill, Mauritius	(Mauritius) Denis Constantin	(South Africa) Gavin Polmans (South Africa) Neale Woodroffe	6–15, 15–10, 15–17	Bronze

Mixed doubles
Year	Venue	Partner	Opponent	Score	Result
2010	Sharing Youth Center; Kampala, Uganda	(Mauritius) Amrita Sawaram	(South Africa) Roelof Dednam (South Africa) Annari Viljoen	13–21, 8–21	Bronze
2007	Stadium Badminton Rose Hill; Rose Hill, Mauritius	(Mauritius) Karen Foo Kune	(Seychelles) Georgie Cupidon (Seychelles) Juliette Ah-Wan	14–21, 13–21	Bronze
2004	National Badminton Centre; Rose Hill, Mauritius	(Mauritius) Shama Aboobakar	(Nigeria) Greg Okuonghae (Nigeria) Grace Daniel	9–15, 15–11, 9–15	Silver
1998	Rose Hill, Mauritius	(Mauritius) Marie-Hélène Pierre	(South Africa) Johan Kleingeld (South Africa) Lina Fourie	2–15, 15–9, 9–15	Bronze

=== BWF International Challenge/Series ===
Men's singles
Year	Tournament	Opponent	Score	Result
2002	Kenya International	(Nigeria) Ola Fagbemi	4–7, 6–8, 1–7	(silver) Runner-up
2001	Mauritius International	(France) Sydney Lengagne	5–7, 7–4, 0–7	(silver) Runner-up

Men's doubles
Year	Tournament	Partner	Opponent	Score	Result
2002	Mauritius International	(Mauritius) Yogeshsingh Mahadnac	(Wales) Matthew Hughes (Wales) Martyn Lewis	10–15, 11–15	(silver) Runner-up
2002	Kenya International	(Mauritius) Hyder Aboobakar	(Mauritius) Geenesh Dussain (Mauritius) Yogeshsingh Mahadnac	7–4, 7–4, 7–5	(gold) Winner
2001	South Africa International	(Mauritius) Denis Constantin	(Mauritius) Geenesh Dussain (Mauritius) Yogeshsingh Mahadnac	15–13, 17–16	(gold) Winner

Mixed doubles
Year	Tournament	Partner	Opponent	Score	Result
2008	South Africa International	(Mauritius) Shama Aboobakar	(South Africa) Chris Dednam (South Africa) Michelle Edwards	17–21, 12–21	(silver) Runner-up
2005	Kenya International	(Mauritius) Shama Aboobakar	(Mauritius) Eddy Clarisse (Mauritius) Amrita Sawaram	16–17, 7–15	(silver) Runner-up
2002	Mauritius International	(Mauritius) Shama Aboobakar	(Wales) Matthew Hughes (England) Joanne Muggeridge	5–11, 3–11	(silver) Runner-up
2002	Kenya International	(Mauritius) Shama Aboobakar	(Nigeria) Ola Fagbemi (Nigeria) Grace Daniel	2–7, 7–1, 7–2, 7–4	(gold) Winner
2001	Mauritius International	(Mauritius) Shama Aboobakar	(Seychelles) Georgie Cupidon (Seychelles) Juliette Ah-Wan	7–2, 7–3, 7–8	(gold) Winner

BWF International Challenge tournament
BWF International Series tournament
BWF Future Series tournament

== Career overview ==
=== Olympic Games ===
At the 1996 Summer Olympics, he competed in men's singles event and defeated by Fumihiko Machida of Japan in the first round with the score 15-11, 15-5. In men's doubles event, he was partnered with Eddy Clarisse and defeated by Peter Blackburn and Paul Straight of Australia in the first round with the score 15-3, 15-7. In mixed doubles event, he was partnered with Martine de Souza and defeated by Jens Eriksen and Helene Kirkegaard of Denmark in the first round with the score 15-6, 15-8. At the 2000 Summer Olympics, he competed in mixed doubles event partnered with Marie-Helene Valerie-Pierre and defeated by the Canadian pairs Mike Beres and Kara Solmundson in the first round with the score 15-2, 15-6.
