= Johan Kleingeld =

South African badminton player (born 1971)

Personal information
- Born: Johannes Kleingeld; 10 June 1971 (age 55)
- Height: 1.85 m (6 ft 1 in)

Sport
- Country: South Africa
- Sport: Badminton
- Handedness: Right
- BWF profile
Medal record
Men's badminton
Representing South Africa
All-Africa Games
Gold medal – first place	2003 Abuja	Mixed team
Silver medal – second place	2007 Algiers	Mixed team
Bronze medal – third place	2003 Abuja	Men's doubles
African Championships
Gold medal – first place	2004 Rose Hill	Men's doubles
Gold medal – first place	2004 Rose Hill	Mixed team
Gold medal – first place	2002 Casablanca	Mixed team
Gold medal – first place	1998 Rose Hill	Men's doubles
Silver medal – second place	2002 Casablanca	Men's doubles
Silver medal – second place	2002 Casablanca	Mixed doubles
Silver medal – second place	1998 Rose Hill	Men's singles
Silver medal – second place	1998 Rose Hill	Mixed doubles
Bronze medal – third place	2004 Rose Hill	Mixed doubles
Africa Team Championships
Gold medal – first place	2006 Rose Hill	Men's team

Johannes Kleingeld (born 10 June 1971) is a South African badminton player. He was the men's doubles champion at the African Championships in 1998 and 2004. Kleingeld competed at the 2003 and 2007 All-Africa Games, and helped the team win the gold medal in 2003. He also represented his country at the 1994 and 1998 Commonwealth Games.

== Achievements ==
=== All-Africa Games ===
Men's doubles
Year	Venue	Partner	Opponent	Score	Result
2003	Indoor Sports Halls National Stadium; Abuja, Nigeria	(South Africa) Chris Dednam	(Nigeria) Greg Okuonghae (Nigeria) Ibrahim Adamu		Bronze

=== African Championships ===
Men's singles
Year	Venue	Opponent	Score	Result
1998	Rose Hill, Mauritius	(Mauritius) Édouard Clarisse	8–15, 5–15	Silver

Men's doubles
Year	Venue	Partner	Opponent	Score	Result
2004	National Badminton Centre; Rose Hill, Mauritius	(South Africa) Chris Dednam	(Nigeria) Dotun Akinsanya (Nigeria) Abimbola Odejoke	15–2, 15–6	Gold
2002	Casablanca, Morocco	(South Africa) Chris Dednam	(Mauritius) Stephan Beeharry (Mauritius) Denis Constantin		Silver
1998	Rose Hill, Mauritius	(South Africa) Anton Kriel	(South Africa) Gavin Polmans (South Africa) Neale Woodroffe	15–7, 15–9	Gold

Mixed doubles
Year	Venue	Partner	Opponent	Score	Result
2004	National Badminton Centre; Rose Hill, Mauritius	(South Africa) Marika Daubern	(Mauritius) Stephan Beeharry (Mauritius) Shama Aboobakar	10–15, 13–15	Bronze
2002	Casablanca, Morocco	(South Africa) Chantal Botts	(South Africa) Chris Dednam (South Africa) Antoinette Uys		Silver
1998	Rose Hill, Mauritius	(South Africa) Lina Fourie	(South Africa) Anton Kriel (South Africa) Michelle Edwards	11–15, 0–15	Silver

=== IBF International ===
Men's singles
Year	Tournament	Opponent	Score	Result
1999	South Africa International	(South Africa) Michael Adams	15–12, 16–17, 15–4	(gold) Winner
1997	South Africa International	(Nigeria) Kayode Akinsanya	15–6, 15–11	(gold) Winner
1996	South Africa International	(South Africa) Ivan Botha	15–0, 15–5	(gold) Winner
1995	Botswana International	(Zambia) Mubanga Kaite	15–11, 15–6	(gold) Winner

Men's doubles
Year	Tournament	Partner	Opponent	Score	Result
2002	South Africa International	(South Africa) Chris Dednam	(South Africa) Stewart Carson (South Africa) Dorian James	5–7, 7–0, 7–5, –	(gold) Winner
2000	South Africa International	(South Africa) Gavin Polmans	(South Africa) Anton Kriel (South Africa) Nico Meerholz	17–14, 12–15, 9–15	(silver) Runner-up
1999	South Africa International	(South Africa) Anton Kriel	(Mauritius) Mike Adams (Mauritius) Yogeshsingh Mahadnac	15–9, 15–12	(gold) Winner
1998	South Africa International	(South Africa) Anton Kriel	(Denmark) Kenneth Jonassen (Denmark) Jonas Rasmussen	3–15, 8–15	(silver) Runner-up
1997	South Africa International	(South Africa) Gavin Polmans	(South Africa) Anton Kriel (South Africa) Nico Meerholz	7–15, 10–15	(silver) Runner-up
1996	South Africa International	(South Africa) Gavin Polmans	(South Africa) Anton Kriel (South Africa) Nico Meerholz	17–15, 15–11	(gold) Winner
1995	Botswana International	(South Africa) Paul Woodroffe	(Zambia) Mubanga Kaite (Zambia) Stanley Pitiri Mwangulu	15–2, 15–4	(gold) Winner

Mixed doubles
Year	Tournament	Partner	Opponent	Score	Result
2001	South Africa International	(South Africa) Karen Coetzer	(South Africa) Anton Kriel (South Africa) Antoinette Uys	Walkover	(gold) Winner
2000	South Africa International	(South Africa) Karen Coetzer	(South Africa) Anton Kriel (South Africa) Michelle Edwards	15–13, 12–15, 5–15	(silver) Runner-up
1999	South Africa International	(South Africa) Karen Coetzer	(South Africa) Stewart Carson (South Africa) Antoinette Uys	15–7, 15–8	(gold) Winner
1997	South Africa International	(South Africa) Lina Fourie	(South Africa) Nico Meerholz (South Africa) Tracey Thompson	10–15, 15–9, 15–4	(gold) Winner
1996	South Africa International	(South Africa) Michelle Edwards	(South Africa) Alex Nel (South Africa) Annalize van Staden	15–5, 15–8	(gold) Winner
1995	Botswana International	(South Africa) Lina Fourie	(South Africa) Nico Meerholz (South Africa) Tracey Thompson	15–3, 15–3	(gold) Winner
