= Marie-Hélène Pierre =

Mauritian badminton player (born 1978)

Personal information
- Born: Marie-Hélène Valérie-Pierre; 20 October 1978 (age 48) Black River, Mauritius
- Height: 1.63 m (5 ft 4 in)
- Weight: 51 kg (112 lb)

Sport
- Country: Mauritius
- Sport: Badminton
- Event: Women's & mixed doubles

Women's & mixed doubles
- BWF profile
Medal record
Women's badminton
Representing Mauritius
African Championships
Bronze medal – third place	1998 Rose Hill	Women's doubles
Bronze medal – third place	1998 Rose Hill	Mixed doubles

Marie-Hélène Valérie-Pierre (born 20 October 1978) is a Mauritian badminton player. She competed at the 2000 Summer Olympics in Sydney, Australia in the women's doubles event partnered with Amrita Sawaram, and in the mixed doubles event with Stephan Beehary. She also represented her country at the 1998 Commonwealth Games in Kuala Lumpur, Malaysia.

== Achievements ==
=== African Championships ===
Women's doubles
Year	Venue	Partner	Opponent	Score	Result
1998	Rose Hill, Mauritius	(Mauritius) Vandanah Seesurun	(South Africa) Lina Fourie (South Africa) Monique Ric-Hansen	1–15, 9–15	Bronze

Mixed doubles
Year	Venue	Partner	Opponent	Score	Result
1998	Rose Hill, Mauritius	(Mauritius) Stephan Beeharry	(South Africa) Johan Kleingeld (South Africa) Lina Fourie	2–15, 15–9, 9–15	Bronze
