= Eddy Clarisse =

Mauritian badminton player

Personal information
- Born: Édouard Clarisse; 27 May 1972 (age 54) Mauritius
- Years active: 1987-2006
- Height: 1.78 m (5 ft 10 in)
- Weight: 79 kg (174 lb; 12.4 st)

Sport
- Country: Mauritius
- Sport: Badminton
- BWF profile
Medal record
Men's badminton
Representing Mauritius
All-Africa Games
| Bronze medal – third place | 2003 Abuja | Men's doubles |
| Bronze medal – third place | 2003 Abuja | Mixed team |
African Championships
| Gold medal – first place | 2000 Bauchi | Men's doubles |
| Gold medal – first place | 1998 Rose Hill | Men's singles |
| Gold medal – first place | 1994 Rose Hill | Men's singles |
| Gold medal – first place | 1992 Rose Hill | Men's singles |
| Silver medal – second place | 1992 Rose Hill | Men's doubles |
| Bronze medal – third place | 2000 Bauchi | Men's singles |
Africa Team Championships
| Silver medal – second place | 2006 Rose Hill | Men's team |

Édouard Clarisse (born 27 May 1972) is a retired badminton player from Mauritius, who started playing badminton in 1987, ending his career in March 2006 at the Commonwealth Games in Melbourne, Australia.

Clarisse has participated three times in the Olympic Games (Barcelona 1992, Atlanta 1996, Sydney 2000). He has also been African champion three times in the men's singles (1992, 1994, 1998), also African champion in men's doubles and the team event in 2000.

Clarisse counts several participations at the World Championships and in the Thomas Cup. He has a total of nine gold medals at Indian Ocean Island Games, hence two in the Men's singles (1993 and 1998). With his 10 titles as Mauritius champion in the men's singles and almost as many in men's Doubles, he remains until now the most successful badminton player of this small island in the Indian Ocean. 2005 he won the Kenya International.

== Achievements ==
=== All-Africa Games ===
Men's doubles
| Year | Venue | Partner | Opponent | Score | Result |
|---|---|---|---|---|---|
| 2003 | Indoor Sports Halls National Stadium; Abuja, Nigeria | (Mauritius) Stephan Beeharry | (Nigeria) Abimbola Odejoke (Nigeria) Dotun Akinsanya | –, –, – | Bronze |

=== African Championships ===
Men's singles
| Year | Venue | Opponent | Score | Result |
|---|---|---|---|---|
| 2000 | Multi-Purpose Sports Hall; Bauchi, Nigeria | (Nigeria) Ola Fagbemi | 6–15, 3–15 | Bronze |
| 1998 | Rose Hill, Mauritius | (South Africa) Johan Kleingeld | 15–8, 15–5 | Gold |
| 1994 | Rose Hill, Mauritius | | | Gold |
| 1992 | Rose Hill, Mauritius | (South Africa) Anton Kriel | 11–15, 15–7, 15–10 | Gold |

Men's doubles
| Year | Venue | Partner | Opponent | Score | Result |
|---|---|---|---|---|---|
| 2000 | Multi-Purpose Sports Hall; Bauchi, Nigeria | (Mauritius) Denis Constantin | (Nigeria) Dotun Akinsanya (Nigeria) Abimbola Odejoke | 15–2, 15–8 | Gold |
| 1992 | Rose Hill, Mauritius | (Mauritius) Gilles Allet | (South Africa) Anton Kriel (South Africa) Nico Meerholz | 7–15, 1–15 | Silver |

=== IBF International ===
Men's singles
| Year | Tournament | Opponent | Score | Result |
|---|---|---|---|---|
| 1991 | Kenya International | (Nigeria) Agarawu Tunde | 17–14, 12–15, 12–15 | (silver) Runner-up |

Mixed doubles
| Year | Tournament | Partner | Opponent | Score | Result |
|---|---|---|---|---|---|
| 2005 | Kenya International | (Mauritius) Amrita Sawaram | (Mauritius) Stephan Beeharry (Mauritius) Shama Aboobakar | 17–16, 15–7 | (gold) Winner |
