= Georgie Cupidon =

Seychellois badminton player

Personal information
- Born: Georgie Winsley Cupidon; 10 November 1981 (age 45) Victoria, Seychelles
- Height: 1.75 m (5 ft 9 in)
- Weight: 80 kg (176 lb; 12 st 8 lb)

Sport
- Country: Seychelles
- Sport: Badminton
- Event: Mixed doubles

Mixed doubles
- BWF profile
Medal record
Representing Seychelles
Men's badminton
All-Africa Games
Gold medal – first place	2007 Algiers	Mixed doubles
Silver medal – second place	2011 Maputo	Mixed doubles
Bronze medal – third place	2015 Brazzaville	Mixed doubles
Bronze medal – third place	2015 Brazzaville	Mixed team
Bronze medal – third place	2011 Maputo	Men's doubles
Bronze medal – third place	2011 Maputo	Mixed team
Bronze medal – third place	2007 Algiers	Mixed team
Bronze medal – third place	2003 Abuja	Mixed team
African Championships
Gold medal – first place	2007 Rose Hill	Mixed doubles
Gold medal – first place	2007 Rose Hill	Mixed team
Gold medal – first place	2006 Algiers	Mixed doubles
Silver medal – second place	2009 Nairobi	Mixed doubles
Silver medal – second place	2009 Nairobi	Mixed team
Silver medal – second place	2007 Rose Hill	Men's doubles
Bronze medal – third place	2014 Gaborone	Men's doubles
Bronze medal – third place	2014 Gaborone	Mixed team
Bronze medal – third place	2013 Rose Hill	Mixed team
Bronze medal – third place	2012 Addis Ababa	Mixed doubles
Bronze medal – third place	2009 Nairobi	Men's doubles
Bronze medal – third place	2006 Algiers	Men's doubles
Bronze medal – third place	2006 Algiers	Mixed team
Bronze medal – third place	2000 Bauchi	Men's doubles

Georgie Winsley Cupidon (born 10 November 1981) is a badminton player from Seychelles. He competed in badminton at the 2008 Summer Olympics in the mixed doubles with Juliette Ah-Wan and they were defeated in the first round by Robert Mateusiak and Nadieżda Kostiuczyk. He carried the national flag at the 2008 Summer Olympics opening ceremony. Together with Ah-Wan, he won the gold medals at the 2006 and 2007 African Championships, also at the 2007 All-Africa Games. He competed in four consecutive Commonwealth Games from 2002 to 2014.

== Achievements ==
=== All-Africa Games ===
Men's doubles
Year	Venue	Partner	Opponent	Score	Result
2011	Escola Josina Machel; Maputo, Mozambique	(Seychelles) Steve Malcouzanne	(Nigeria) Jinkan Ifraimu (Nigeria) Ola Fagbemi	16–21, 10–21	Bronze

Mixed doubles
Year	Venue	Partner	Opponent	Score	Result
2015	Gymnase Étienne Mongha; Brazzaville, Republic of the Congo	(Seychelles) Juliette Ah-Wan	(South Africa) Andries Malan (South Africa) Jennifer Fry	15–21, 18–21	Bronze
2011	Escola Josina Machel; Maputo, Mozambique	(Seychelles) Allisen Camille	(Nigeria) Willem Viljoen (Nigeria) Annari Viljoen	20–22, 21–9, 16–21	Silver
2007	Salle OMS El Biar; Algiers, Algeria	(Seychelles) Juliette Ah-Wan	(Nigeria) Greg Okuonghae (Nigeria) Grace Daniel	21–14, 21–17	Gold

=== African Championships ===
Men's doubles
Year	Venue	Partner	Opponent	Score	Result
2014	Lobatse Stadium; Gaborone, Botswana	(Seychelles) Steve Malcouzane	(South Africa) Andries Malan (South Africa) Willem Viljoen	12–21, 10–21	Bronze
2009	Moi International Sports Complex; Nairobi, Kenya	(Seychelles) Steve Malcouzane	(Nigeria) Jinkan Ifraimu (Nigeria) Ola Fagbemi	10–21, 18–21	Bronze
2007	Rose Hill, Mauritius	(Seychelles) Steve Malcouzane	(South Africa) Chris Dednam (South Africa) Roelof Dednam	17–21, 16–21	Silver
2006	Algiers, Algeria	(Seychelles) Steve Malcouzane	(South Africa) Chris Dednam (South Africa) Roelof Dednam	23–25, 25–23, 13–21	Bronze
2000	Bauchi, Nigeria	(Seychelles) Nicholas Jumaye	(Nigeria) Dotun Akinsanya (Nigeria) Abimbola Odejoke	4–15, 4–15	Bronze

Mixed doubles
Year	Venue	Partner	Opponent	Score	Result
2012	Arat Kilo Hall; Addis Ababa, Ethiopia	(Seychelles) Allisen Camille	(South Africa) Enrico James (South Africa) Stacey Doubell	16–21, 21–17, 23–25	Bronze
2009	Moi International Sports Complex; Nairobi, Kenya	(Seychelles) Juliette Ah-Wan	(Nigeria) Ola Fagbemi (Nigeria) Grace Daniel	21–18, 20–22, 16–21	Silver
2007	Rose Hill, Mauritius	(Seychelles) Juliette Ah-Wan	(South Africa) Chris Dednam (South Africa) Michelle Edwards	21–16, 11–21, 21–15	Gold
2006	Algiers, Algeria	(Seychelles) Juliette Ah-Wan	(South Africa) Dorian James (South Africa) Michelle Edwards	21–16, 17–21, 21–16	Gold

=== BWF International Challenge/Series ===
Men's doubles
Year	Tournament	Partner	Opponent	Score	Result
2008	Kenya International	(Seychelles) Steve Malcouzane	(Kenya) Himesh Patel (Kenya) Patrick Ruto	21–11, 21–19	(gold) Winner

Mixed doubles
Year	Tournament	Partner	Opponent	Score	Result
2013	Mauritius International	(Seychelles) Allisen Camille	(South Africa) Willem Viljoen (South Africa) Michelle Butler-Emmett	12–21, 13–21	(silver) Runner-up
2012	Mauritius International	(Seychelles) Cynthia Course	(Mauritius) Deeneshsing Baboolall (Mauritius) Shama Aboobakar	21–19, 21–14	(gold) Winner
2009	Mauritius International	(Seychelles) Juliette Ah-Wan	(Nigeria) Ola Fagbemi (Nigeria) Grace Daniel	17–21, 16–21	(silver) Runner-up
2007	Mauritius International	(Seychelles) Juliette Ah-Wan	(South Africa) Chris Dednam (South Africa) Michelle Edwards	9–21, 17–21	(silver) Runner-up
2006	Mauritius International	(Seychelles) Juliette Ah-Wan	(Nigeria) Greg Okuonghae (Nigeria) Grace Daniel	17–21, 20–22	(silver) Runner-up
2001	Mauritius International	(Seychelles) Juliette Ah-Wan	(Mauritius) Stephan Beeharry (Mauritius) Shama Aboobakar	2–7, 3–7, 8–7	(silver) Runner-up
1999	Kenya International	(Seychelles) Juliette Ah-Wan	(Seychelles) Steve Malcouzane (Seychelles) Lucia Banane	15–10, 15–6	(gold) Winner

BWF International Challenge tournament
BWF International Series tournament
BWF Future Series tournament

Olympic Games
Preceded by Allan Julie	Flagbearer for Seychelles; Beijing 2008	Succeeded by Dominic Dugasse
