= Botswana International =

Badminton championships

The Botswana International is an open badminton tournament held in Gaborone, Botswana. The tournament has been an International Series level, except in 2012 and since 2018 categorized as Future Series level from Badminton World Federation.

== Previous winners ==
Year	Men's singles	Women's singles	Men's doubles	Women's doubles	Mixed doubles	Ref
1993	(South Africa) Jeff Pawson	(Namibia) Bianca Kustner	(South Africa) Allan de Beer (South Africa) Jeff Pawson	(Namibia) Bianca Kustner (Namibia) Heidi Spinas	(South Africa) Allan de Beer (South Africa) Megan Laing	
1994	No competition					
1995	(South Africa) Johan Kleingeld	(South Africa) Lina Fourie	(South Africa) Johan Kleingeld (South Africa) Paul Woodroffe	(South Africa) Lina Fourie (South Africa) Tracey Thompson	(South Africa) Johan Kleingeld (South Africa) Lina Fourie	
1996– 1998	No competition					
1999	(South Africa) Anton Kriel	No competition	(South Africa) Anton Kriel (South Africa) Billy Kuyper	No competition	(South Africa) Anton Kriel (South Africa) Michelle Claire Edwards	
2000– 2009	No competition					
2010	(Italy) Giovanni Traina	(Italy) Agnese Allegrini	(South Africa) Dorian James (South Africa) Willem Viljoen	(South Africa) Annari Viljoen (South Africa) Michelle Claire Edwards	(South Africa) Dorian James (South Africa) Michelle Claire Edwards	
2011	(Uganda) Edwin Ekiring	(Austria) Claudia Mayer	(Nigeria) Jinkan Ifraimu (Nigeria) Ola Fagbemi	(South Africa) Annari Viljoen (South Africa) Michelle Claire Edwards	(South Africa) Dorian James (South Africa) Michelle Claire Edwards	
2012	(Scotland) Alistair Casey	(Mauritius) Shama Aboobakar	(South Africa) Andries Malan (South Africa) Reneshan Naidoo	(South Africa) Elme de Villiers (South Africa) Jennifer van den Berg	(South Africa) Andries Malan (South Africa) Jennifer van den Berg	
2013	(South Africa) Jacob Maliekal	(Portugal) Telma Santos	(Slovenia) Roj Alen (Slovenia) Kek Jamnik	(South Africa) Elme de Villiers (Serbia) Sandra Halilovic	(Egypt) Abdelrahman Kashkal (Egypt) Hadia Hosny	
2014	(Austria) Luka Wraber	(Nigeria) Grace Gabriel	(South Africa) Andries Malan (South Africa) Willem Viljoen	(South Africa) Elme de Villiers (Nigeria) Grace Gabriel	(South Africa) Willem Viljoen (South Africa) Annari Viljoen	
2015	(United States) Howard Shu	(Hungary) Laura Sárosi	(South Africa) Andries Malan (South Africa) Willem Viljoen	(Nigeria) Grace Gabriel (Zambia) Ogar Siamupangila	(Egypt) Abdelrahman Kashkal (Egypt) Hadia Hosny	
2016	(Russia) Anatoliy Yartsev	(Russia) Evgeniya Kosetskaya	(India) Alwin Francis (India) Tarun Kona	(Egypt) Doha Hany (Egypt) Hadia Hosny	(Russia) Anatoliy Yartsev (Russia) Evgeniya Kosetskaya	
2017	(Mexico) Luis Ramon Garrido	(South Africa) Johanita Scholtz	(India) Adarsh Kumar (India) Jagadish Yadav	(South Africa) Michelle Butler-Emmett (South Africa) Jennifer Fry	(South Africa) Andries Malan (South Africa) Jennifer Fry	
2018	(Azerbaijan) Ade Resky Dwicahyo	(Jordan) Domou Amro	(Azerbaijan) Ade Resky Dwicahyo (Azerbaijan) Azmy Qowimuramadhoni	(South Africa) Michelle Butler-Emmett (South Africa) Jennifer Fry	(South Africa) Andries Malan (South Africa) Jennifer Fry	
2019	(South Africa) Cameron Coetzer	(South Africa) Johanita Scholtz	(South Africa) Jason Mann (South Africa) Bongani Von Bodenstein	(South Africa) Megan De Beer (South Africa) Johanita Scholtz	(South Africa) Jarred Elliott (South Africa) Megan De Beer	
2020	Cancelled (Note: This tournament, originally to be played from 19 to 22 November, was later cancelled due to the COVID-19 pandemic in Botswana.)					
2021	(India) Farogh Sanjay Aman	(India) Revati Devasthale	(South Africa) Jarred Elliott (South Africa) Robert Summers	(South Africa) Amy Ackerman (South Africa) Johanita Scholtz	(Kazakhstan) Dmitriy Panarin (Kazakhstan) Kamila Smagulova	
2022	(Jordan) Bahaedeen Ahmad Alshannik	(South Africa) Johanita Scholtz	(Kazakhstan) Artur Niyazov (Kazakhstan) Dmitriy Panarin	(South Africa) Amy Ackerman (South Africa) Deidre Laurens	(South Africa) Jarred Elliott (South Africa) Amy Ackerman	
2023	(Mauritius) Julien Paul	(United Arab Emirates) Nurani Ratu Azzahra	(Malaysia) Keane Chok (Malaysia) Andy Kok	(South Africa) Amy Ackerman (South Africa) Deidre Laurens	(Mauritius) Julien Paul (Mauritius) Kate Ludik	
2024	(Azerbaijan) Dicky Dwi Pangestu	(Maldives) Fathimath Nabaaha Abdul Razzaq	(Azerbaijan) Agil Gabilov (Azerbaijan) Dicky Dwi Pangestu	(Sri Lanka) Hasini Ambalangodage (Sri Lanka) Hasara Wijayarathne	(Azerbaijan) Agil Gabilov (Azerbaijan) Era Maftuha	
2025	(Vietnam) Phan Phúc Thịnh	(South Africa) Johanita Scholtz	(India) Tanmoy Bikash Boruah (India) Kuldeep Kamal	(South Africa) Amy Ackerman (South Africa) Johanita Scholtz	(South Africa) Robert Summers (South Africa) Amy Ackerman	
2026	Cancelled					

BWF International Challenge tournament
BWF International Series tournament
BWF Future Series tournament

== Performances by nation ==
As of the 2025 edition

Pos	Nation	MS	WS	MD	WD	XD	Total
1	South Africa	5	5	9	12	12	43
2	Azerbaijan	2	0	2	0	1	5
2	India	1	1	3	0	0	5
4	Egypt	0	0	0	1	2	3
4	Mauritius	1	1	0	0	1	3
4	Nigeria	0	1	1	1	0	3
4	Russia	1	1	0	0	1	3
8	Austria	1	1	0	0	0	2
8	Italy	1	1	0	0	0	2
8	Jordan	1	1	0	0	0	2
8	Kazakhstan	0	0	1	0	1	2
8	Namibia	0	1	0	1	0	2
13	Hungary	0	1	0	0	0	1
13	Malaysia	0	0	1	0	0	1
13	Maldives	0	1	0	0	0	1
13	Mexico	1	0	0	0	0	1
13	Portugal	0	1	0	0	0	1
13	Scotland	1	0	0	0	0	1
13	Slovenia	0	0	1	0	0	1
13	Sri Lanka	0	0	0	1	0	1
13	Uganda	1	0	0	0	0	1
13	United Arab Emirates	0	1	0	0	0	1
13	United States	1	0	0	0	0	1
13	Vietnam	1	0	0	0	0	1
25	Serbia	0	0	0	0.5	0	0.5
25	Zambia	0	0	0	0.5	0	0.5
Total		18	17	18	17	18	88
