= 2002 African Badminton Championships =

Tournament details
- Dates: 15–21 July
- Edition: 11th
- Venue: Mohammed V Indoor Sport Complex
- Location: Casablanca, Morocco

The 2002 African Badminton Championships were the continental badminton championships to crown the best players and teams across Africa. The tournament was held at the Mohammed V Indoor Sport Complex in Casablanca, Morocco, from 15 to 21 July 2002.

In the team event, South Africa defeated Nigeria in the final while Mauritius defeated Seychelles in the third place play-off. Seychelles also won their first ever gold medal at the championships with Juliette Ah-Wan winning the women's singles title.

== Medalists ==
Event	Gold	Silver	Bronze
Men's singles	(Nigeria) Abimbola Odejoke	(Nigeria) Dotun Akinsanya	(Mauritius) Denis Constantin
Men's singles	(Nigeria) Abimbola Odejoke	(Nigeria) Dotun Akinsanya	(Nigeria) Ola Fagbemi
Women's singles	(Seychelles) Juliette Ah-Wan	(Nigeria) Grace Daniel	(South Africa) Shama Aboobakar
Women's singles	(Seychelles) Juliette Ah-Wan	(Nigeria) Grace Daniel	(South Africa) Michelle Edwards
Men's doubles	(Mauritius) Stephan Beeharry (Mauritius) Denis Constantin	(South Africa) Chris Dednam (South Africa) Johan Kleingeld	(Nigeria) Dotun Akinsanya (Nigeria) Abimbola Odejoke
Men's doubles	(Mauritius) Stephan Beeharry (Mauritius) Denis Constantin	(South Africa) Chris Dednam (South Africa) Johan Kleingeld	(Nigeria) Ocholi Edicha (Nigeria) Ola Fagbemi
Women's doubles	(South Africa) Chantal Botts (South Africa) Michelle Edwards	(Nigeria) Grace Daniel (Nigeria) Miriam Sude	(Seychelles) Juliette Ah-Wan (Seychelles) Catherina Paulin
Women's doubles	(South Africa) Chantal Botts (South Africa) Michelle Edwards	(Nigeria) Grace Daniel (Nigeria) Miriam Sude	(Mauritius) Anusha Dajee (Mauritius) Karen Foo Kune
Mixed doubles	(South Africa) Chris Dednam (South Africa) Antoinette Uys	(South Africa) Johan Kleingeld (South Africa) Chantal Botts	(Nigeria) Abimbola Odejoke (Nigeria) Prisca Azuine
Mixed doubles	(South Africa) Chris Dednam (South Africa) Antoinette Uys	(South Africa) Johan Kleingeld (South Africa) Chantal Botts	(South Africa) Dorian James (South Africa) Michelle Edwards
Mixed team	South Africa; Stewart Carson; Chris Dednam; Dorian James; Johan Kleingeld; Chantal Botts; Michelle Edwards; Antoinette Uys	Nigeria; Dotun Akinsanya; Ocholi Edicha; Ola Fagbemi; Abimbola Odejoke; Prisca Azuine; Grace Daniel; Kuburat Mumini; Miriam Sude	Mauritius; Hyder Aboobakar; Stephan Beeharry; Denis Constantin; Abhinesh Dussain; Yogesh Mahadnac; Vishal Sawaram; Shama Aboobakar; Anusha Dajee; Karen Foo Kune; Amrita Sawaram

=== Medal table ===
Rank	Nation	Gold	Silver	Bronze	Total
1	South Africa	3	2	3	8
2	Nigeria	1	4	4	9
3	Mauritius	1	0	3	4
4	Seychelles	1	0	1	2
Totals (4 entries)		6	6	11	23
