= 1998 African Badminton Championships =

Tournament details
- Dates: 27 July–2 August
- Edition: 9th
- Venue: National Badminton Centre
- Location: Rose Hill, Mauritius

The 1998 African Badminton Championships were the continental badminton championships to crown the best players and teams across Africa. The tournament was held at the National Badminton Centre in Rose-Hill, Mauritius, from 27 July to 2 August 1998. The tournament was originally scheduled to be held in October 1998 at Casablanca, Morocco.

In the team event, South Africa finished in first place while Mauritius placed second. Madagascar won their first medal at the African championships when their team reached the semi-finals.

== Medalists ==
Event	Gold	Silver	Bronze
Men's singles	(Mauritius) Eddy Clarisse	(South Africa) Johan Kleingeld	(Mauritius) Denis Constantin
Men's singles	(Mauritius) Eddy Clarisse	(South Africa) Johan Kleingeld	(South Africa) Neale Woodroffe
Women's singles	(South Africa) Lina Fourie	(South Africa) Michelle Edwards	(South Africa) Beverley Meerholz
Women's singles	(South Africa) Lina Fourie	(South Africa) Michelle Edwards	(Mauritius) Vandanah Seesurun
Men's doubles	(South Africa) Johan Kleingeld (South Africa) Anton Kriel	(South Africa) Gavin Polmans (South Africa) Neale Woodroffe	(Mauritius) Gilles Allet (Mauritius) Geenesh Dussain
Men's doubles	(South Africa) Johan Kleingeld (South Africa) Anton Kriel	(South Africa) Gavin Polmans (South Africa) Neale Woodroffe	(Mauritius) Stephan Beeharry (Mauritius) Denis Constantin
Women's doubles	(South Africa) Lina Fourie (South Africa) Monique Ric-Hansen	(South Africa) Meagen Burnett (South Africa) Michelle Edwards	(Mauritius) Marie-Hélène Pierre (Mauritius) Vandanah Seesurun
Women's doubles	(South Africa) Lina Fourie (South Africa) Monique Ric-Hansen	(South Africa) Meagen Burnett (South Africa) Michelle Edwards	(Mauritius) Selvon Marudamuthu (Mauritius) Amrita Sawaram
Mixed doubles	(South Africa) Anton Kriel (South Africa) Michelle Edwards	(South Africa) Johan Kleingeld (South Africa) Lina Fourie	(South Africa) Gavin Polmans (South Africa) Monique Ric-Hansen
Mixed doubles	(South Africa) Anton Kriel (South Africa) Michelle Edwards	(South Africa) Johan Kleingeld (South Africa) Lina Fourie	(Mauritius) Stephan Beeharry (Mauritius) Marie-Hélène Pierre
Mixed team	South Africa	Mauritius	Madagascar

=== Medal table ===
* Host nation (Mauritius)

Rank	Nation	Gold	Silver	Bronze	Total
1	South Africa	5	5	3	13
2	Mauritius*	1	1	7	9
3	Madagascar	0	0	1	1
Totals (3 entries)		6	6	11	23
