= Ocholi Edicha =

Nigerian badminton player (born 1979)

Personal information
- Born: Ocholi Abel Edicha; 10 May 1979 (age 47) Kaduna, Nigeria
- Height: 1.86 m (6 ft 1 in)
- Weight: 73 kg (161 lb)

Sport
- Country: Nigeria
- Sport: Badminton
- Handedness: Right

Men's singles & doubles
- Highest ranking: 397 (MS 22 April 2010); 145 (MD 9 September 2010); 464 (XD 31 October 2013)
- BWF profile
Medal record
Men's badminton
Representing Nigeria
All-Africa Games
Gold medal – first place	2003 Abuja	Men's singles
Gold medal – first place	2007 Algiers	Mixed team
Silver medal – second place	2003 Abuja	Mixed team
Bronze medal – third place	2007 Algiers	Men's doubles
African Championships
Silver medal – second place	2002 Casablanca	Mixed team
Silver medal – second place	2010 Kampala	Men's doubles
Bronze medal – third place	2002 Casablanca	Men's doubles
Africa Team Championships
Gold medal – first place	2010 Kampala	Men's team

Ocholi Abel Edicha // (born 10 May 1979) is a Nigerian badminton player. He was the men's singles gold medalist at the 2003 All-Africa Games, also in the mixed team event in 2007. He competed at the 2002 and 2010 Commonwealth Games.

Edicha started his career in badminton at the young age. With the support from his father, he joined Enugu Sports Council. He was recruited by Nigerian Army in 1996, spent for 23 years. He stopped playing for his country after the 2010 New Delhi Commonwealth Games.

== Achievements ==
=== All-Africa Games ===
Men's singles
Year	Venue	Opponent	Score	Result
2003	Indoor Sports Halls National Stadium; Abuja, Nigeria	(Nigeria) Ola Fagbemi	–, –	Gold

Men's doubles
Year	Venue	Partner	Opponent	Score	Result
2007	Salle OMS El Biar; Algiers, Algeria	(Nigeria) Jinkan Ifraimu		–, –	Bronze

=== African Championships ===
Men's doubles
Year	Venue	Partner	Opponent	Score	Result
2010	Sharing Youth Center; Kampala, Uganda	(Nigeria) Ibrahim Adamu	(Nigeria) Jinkan Ifraimu (Nigeria) Ola Fagbemi	12–21, 21–16, 14–21	Silver
2002	Casablanca, Morocco	(Nigeria) Ola Fagbemi	(Mauritius) Stephan Beeharry (Mauritius) Denis Constantin	1–7, 1–7, 1–7	Bronze

Mixed doubles
Year	Venue	Partner	Opponent	Score	Result
2000	Multi-Purpose Sports Hall; Bauchi, Nigeria	(Nigeria) Grace Daniel	(Mauritius) Denis Constantin (Mauritius) Selvon Marudamuthu	14–17, 17–15, 7–15	Bronze

=== BWF International Challenge/Series ===
Men's doubles
Year	Tournament	Partner	Opponent	Score	Result
2007	Kenya International	(Nigeria) Abraham Otagada	(Nigeria) Kenneth Omoruyi (Nigeria) Olorunfemi Elewa	21–18, 12–21, 21–19	(gold) Winner
2002	Nigeria International	(Nigeria) Dotun Akinsanya	(Japan) Yuichi Ikeda (Japan) Shoji Sato	3–15, 1–15	(silver) Runner-up

BWF International Challenge tournament
BWF International Series tournament
BWF Future Series tournament
