= 2000 African Badminton Championships =

Tournament details
- Dates: 24–31 July
- Edition: 10th
- Venue: Bauchi Multi-Purpose Indoor Sports Hall
- Location: Bauchi, Nigeria

The 2000 African Badminton Championships were the continental badminton championships to crown the best players and teams across Africa. The tournament was held at the Bauchi Multi-Purpose Indoor Sports Hall in Bauchi, Nigeria, from 24 to 31 July 2000.

In the team event, South Africa, Mauritius, Seychelles and Nigeria reached the semi-finals. Mauritius won their first ever team title by defeating Nigeria in the final. South Africa defeated Seychelles in the third place play-off.

== Background ==
In May 2000, the Badminton Confederation of Africa awarded Nigeria the rights to host the next African championships at the Bauchi Multi-Purpose Indoor Sports Hall. Originally, 18 countries were supposed to compete in the championships. The participating countries later dropped from 18 to 9 due to the funding issues. In the end, only six countries took part in the tournament.

== Medalists ==
Event	Gold	Silver	Bronze
Men's singles	(Mauritius) Denis Constantin	(Nigeria) Ola Fagbemi	(Nigeria) Abimbola Odejoke
Men's singles	(Mauritius) Denis Constantin	(Nigeria) Ola Fagbemi	(Mauritius) Eddy Clarisse
Women's singles	(Mauritius) Amrita Sawaram	(South Africa) Chantal Botts	(Nigeria) Grace Daniel
Women's singles	(Mauritius) Amrita Sawaram	(South Africa) Chantal Botts	(Nigeria) Prisca Azuine
Men's doubles	(Mauritius) Eddy Clarisse (Mauritius) Denis Constantin	(Nigeria) Dotun Akinsanya (Nigeria) Abimbola Odejoke	(South Africa) Dean Potgieter (South Africa) Eugene Uys
Men's doubles	(Mauritius) Eddy Clarisse (Mauritius) Denis Constantin	(Nigeria) Dotun Akinsanya (Nigeria) Abimbola Odejoke	(Seychelles) Georgie Cupidon (Seychelles) Nicholas Jumaye
Women's doubles	(Nigeria) Grace Daniel (Nigeria) Miriam Sude	(Mauritius) Anusha Dajee (Mauritius) Selvon Marudamuthu	(Nigeria) Bridget Ibenero (Nigeria) Kuburat Mumini
Women's doubles	(Nigeria) Grace Daniel (Nigeria) Miriam Sude	(Mauritius) Anusha Dajee (Mauritius) Selvon Marudamuthu	(South Africa) Chantal Botts (South Africa) Karen Coetzer
Mixed doubles	(Nigeria) Abimbola Odejoke (Nigeria) Bridget Ibenero	(Mauritius) Denis Constantin (Mauritius) Selvon Marudamuthu	(Nigeria) Ocholi Edicha (Nigeria) Grace Daniel
Mixed doubles	(Nigeria) Abimbola Odejoke (Nigeria) Bridget Ibenero	(Mauritius) Denis Constantin (Mauritius) Selvon Marudamuthu	(South Africa) Eugene Uys (South Africa) Ronel Pieterse
Mixed team	Mauritius	Nigeria	South Africa

=== Medal table ===
* Host nation (Nigeria)

Rank	Nation	Gold	Silver	Bronze	Total
1	Mauritius	4	2	1	7
2	Nigeria*	2	3	5	10
3	South Africa	0	1	4	5
4	Seychelles	0	0	1	1
Totals (4 entries)		6	6	11	23
