= Ibrahim Adamu =

Nigerian badminton player (born 1981)

Personal information
- Born: 26 November 1981 (age 44)

Sport
- Country: Nigeria
- Sport: Badminton
- Handedness: Right

Men's singles & doubles
- Highest ranking: 330 (MS 1 April 2010); 145 (MD 9 September 2010); 259 (XD 26 August 2010)
- BWF profile
Medal record
Men's badminton
Representing Nigeria
All-Africa Games
Gold medal – first place	2011 Maputo	Mixed team
Gold medal – first place	2007 Algiers	Mixed team
Gold medal – first place	2003 Abuja	Men's doubles
Silver medal – second place	2003 Abuja	Mixed team
Bronze medal – third place	2011 Maputo	Mixed doubles
Bronze medal – third place	2007 Algiers	Men's doubles
African Championships
Silver medal – second place	2011 Marrakesh	Mixed team
Silver medal – second place	2010 Kampala	Men's doubles
Bronze medal – third place	2011 Marrakesh	Mixed doubles
Bronze medal – third place	2010 Kampala	Men's singles
Bronze medal – third place	2004 Rose Hill	Men's singles
Africa Team Championships
Gold medal – first place	2010 Kampala	Men's team
Gold medal – first place	2008 Rose Hill	Men's team

Ibrahim Adamu(born 26 November 1981) is a Nigerian badminton player. In 2003, he won the gold medal at the All-Africa Games in men's doubles event partnered with Greg Orobosa Okuonghae.

== Achievements ==
=== All-Africa Games ===
Men's doubles
Year	Venue	Partner	Opponent	Score	Result
2007	Salle OMS El Biar; Algiers, Algeria	(Nigeria) Greg Okuonghae	(South Africa)		Bronze
2003	Indoor Sports Halls National Stadium; Abuja, Nigeria	(Nigeria) Greg Okuonghae	(Nigeria) Abimbola Odejoke (Nigeria) Dotun Akinsanya		Gold

Mixed doubles
Year	Venue	Partner	Opponent	Score	Result
2011	Escola Josina Machel; Maputo, Mozambique	(Nigeria) Grace Daniel	(South Africa) Willem Viljoen (South Africa) Annari Viljoen	10–21, 11–21	Bronze

=== African Championships ===
Men's singles
Year	Venue	Opponent	Score	Result
2010	Sharing Youth Center; Kampala, Uganda	(Nigeria) Ola Fagbemi	9–21, 7–21	Bronze
2004	Rose Hill, Mauritius	(Nigeria) Dotun Akinsanya	8–15, 5–15	Bronze

Men's doubles
Year	Venue	Partner	Opponent	Score	Result
2010	Sharing Youth Center; Kampala, Uganda	(Nigeria) Ocholi Edicha	(Nigeria) Jinkan Ifraimu (Nigeria) Ola Fagbemi	12–21, 21–16, 14–21	Silver

Mixed doubles
Year	Venue	Partner	Opponent	Score	Result
2011	Marrakesh, Morocco	(Nigeria) Grace Daniel	(South Africa) Dorian James (South Africa) Michelle Edwards	15–21, 16–21	Bronze

=== BWF International Challenge/Series ===
Men's doubles
Year	Tournament	Partner	Opponent	Score	Result
2017	Benin International	(Nigeria) Enejoh Abah	(Jordan) Bahaedeen Ahmad Alshannik (Jordan) Mohd Naser Mansour Nayef	15–21, 21–19, 21–18	(gold) Winner
2013	Kenya International	(India) Siddhrath Saboo	(Nigeria) Enejoh Abah (Nigeria) Victor Makanju	17–21, 15–21	(silver) Runner-up
2008	Mauritius International	(Nigeria) Greg Okuonghae	(Nigeria) Jinkan Ifraimu (Nigeria) Ola Fagbemi	15–21, 17–21	(silver) Runner-up
2005	South Africa International	(Nigeria) Greg Okuonghae	(South Africa) Chris Dednam (South Africa) Roelof Dednam	15–7, 3–15, 10–15	(silver) Runner-up

BWF International Challenge tournament
BWF International Series tournament
BWF Future Series tournament
