= Ola Fagbemi =

Nigerian badminton player (born 1984)

Personal information
- Born: Ebenezar Olaoluwa Fagbemi; 20 October 1984 (age 42)
- Height: 1.76 m (5 ft 9 in)
- Weight: 80 kg (176 lb)

Sport
- Country: Nigeria
- Sport: Badminton

Men's singles & doubles
- Highest ranking: 106 (MS 18 March 2010); 79 (MD 18 March 2010); 101 (XD 22 March 2012)
- BWF profile
Medal record
Men's badminton
Representing Nigeria
All-Africa Games
Gold medal – first place	2011 Maputo	Men's doubles
Gold medal – first place	2011 Maputo	Mixed team
Gold medal – first place	2007 Algiers	Mixed team
Silver medal – second place	2003 Abuja	Men's singles
Silver medal – second place	2003 Abuja	Mixed team
Bronze medal – third place	2015 Brazzaville	Men's doubles
Bronze medal – third place	2015 Brazzaville	Mixed team
Bronze medal – third place	2011 Maputo	Men's singles
African Championships
Gold medal – first place	2010 Kampala	Men's doubles
Gold medal – first place	2009 Nairobi	Men's singles
Gold medal – first place	2009 Nairobi	Men's doubles
Gold medal – first place	2009 Nairobi	Mixed doubles
Silver medal – second place	2014 Gaborone	Mixed team
Silver medal – second place	2013 Rose Hill	Mixed team
Silver medal – second place	2012 Addis Ababa	Men's doubles
Silver medal – second place	2011 Marrakesh	Men's singles
Silver medal – second place	2011 Marrakesh	Men's doubles
Silver medal – second place	2011 Marrakesh	Mixed team
Silver medal – second place	2010 Kampala	Men's singles
Silver medal – second place	2002 Casablanca	Mixed team
Silver medal – second place	2000 Bauchi	Men's singles
Bronze medal – third place	2014 Gaborone	Mixed doubles
Bronze medal – third place	2012 Addis Ababa	Mixed doubles
Bronze medal – third place	2002 Casablanca	Men's singles
Bronze medal – third place	2002 Casablanca	Men's doubles
Africa Team Championships
Gold medal – first place	2010 Kampala	Men's team
Gold medal – first place	2008 Rose Hill	Men's team
Silver medal – second place	2012 Addis Ababa	Men's team

Ebenezar Olaoluwa Fagbemi (born 20 October 1984) is a Nigerian male badminton player. He competed at the 2002 and 2010 Commonwealth Games. At the All-Africa Games, he has collected three golds, two silvers and three bronzes from 2003 to 2015.

== Achievements ==
=== All African Games ===
Men's singles
Year	Venue	Opponent	Score	Result
2011	Escola Josina Machel; Maputo, Mozambique	(Uganda) Edwin Ekiring	21–15, 13–21, 16–21	Bronze
2003	Indoor Sports Halls National Stadium; Abuja, Nigeria	(Nigeria) Ocholi Edicha		Silver

Men's doubles
Year	Venue	Partner	Opponent	Score	Result
2015	Gymnase Étienne Mongha; Brazzaville, Republic of the Congo	(Nigeria) Jinkan Ifraimu	(South Africa) Andries Malan (South Africa) Willem Viljoen	16–21, 19–21	Bronze
2011	Escola Josina Machel; Maputo, Mozambique	(Nigeria) Jinkan Ifraimu	(South Africa) Dorian James (South Africa) Willem Viljoen	21–18, 21–19	Gold

=== African Championships ===
Men's singles
Year	Venue	Opponent	Score	Result
2011	Marrakesh, Morocco	(Nigeria) Jinkan Ifraimu	21–16, 19–21, 18–21	Silver
2010	Kampala, Uganda	(Nigeria) Jinkan Ifraimu	15–21, 0–21 Retired	Silver
2009	Nairobi, Kenya	(Nigeria) Jinkan Ifraimu	21–18, 21–18	Gold
2002	Casablanca, Morocco	(Nigeria) Dotun Akinsanya	7–5, 6–8, 6–8	Bronze
2000	Bauchi, Nigeria	(Mauritius) Denis Constantin	11–15, 8–15	Silver

Men's doubles
Year	Venue	Partner	Opponent	Score	Result
2012	Arat Kilo Hall, Addis Ababa, Ethiopia	(Nigeria) Jinkan Ifraimu	(South Africa) Dorian James (South Africa) Willem Viljoen	15–21, 5–21	Silver
2011	Marrakesh, Morocco	(Nigeria) Jinkan Ifraimu	(South Africa) Dorian James (South Africa) Willem Viljoen	18–21, 14–21	Silver
2010	Kampala, Uganda	(Nigeria) Jinkan Ifraimu	(Nigeria) Ibrahim Adamu (Nigeria) Edicha Abel Ocholi	21–12, 16–21, 21–14	Gold
2009	Nairobi, Kenya	(Nigeria) Jinkan Ifraimu	(South Africa) Dorian James (South Africa) Chris Dednam	21–13, 21–14	Gold
2002	Casablanca, Morocco	(Nigeria) Ocholi Edicha	(Mauritius) Stephan Beeharry (Mauritius) Denis Constantin	1–7, 1–7, 1–7	Bronze

Mixed doubles
Year	Venue	Partner	Opponent	Score	Result
2014	Lobatse Stadium, Gaborone, Botswana	(Nigeria) Dorcas Adesokan	(South Africa) Willem Viljoen (South Africa) Michelle Butler Emmett	17–21, 16–21	Bronze
2012	Arat Kilo Hall, Addis Ababa, Ethiopia	(Nigeria) Susan Ideh	(South Africa) Dorian James (South Africa) Michelle Edwards	18–21, 17–21	Bronze
2009	Nairobi, Kenya	(Nigeria) Grace Daniel	(Seychelles) Georgie Cupidon (Seychelles) Juliette Ah-Wan	18–21, 22–20, 21–16	Gold

=== BWF International Challenge/Series ===
Men's singles
Year	Tournament	Opponent	Score	Result
2002	Kenya International	(Mauritius) Stephan Beeharry	7–4, 8–6, 7–1	(gold) Winner

Men's doubles
Year	Tournament	Partner	Opponent	Score	Result
2014	Nigeria International	(Nigeria) Jinkan Ifraimu	(Nigeria) Enejoh Abah (Nigeria) Victor Makanju	10–11, 11–5, 11–8, 11–9	(gold) Winner
2014	Lagos International	(Nigeria) Jinkan Ifraimu	(South Africa) Andries Malan (South Africa) Willem Viljoen	14–21, 20–22	(silver) Runner-up
2013	Nigeria International	(Nigeria) Jinkan Ifraimu	(Nigeria) Enejoh Abah (Nigeria) Victor Makanju	22–20, 21–19	(gold) Winner
2012	Uganda International	(Nigeria) Jinkan Ifraimu	(South Africa) Dorian Lance James (South Africa) Willem Viljoen	22–24, 19–21	(silver) Runner-up
2011	Botswana International	(Nigeria) Jinkan Ifraimu	(South Africa) Dorian Lance James (South Africa) Willem Viljoen	23–21, 13–21, 21–15	(gold) Winner
2010	Kenya International	(Nigeria) Jinkan Ifraimu	(South Africa) Dorian Lance James (South Africa) Willem Viljoen	20–22, 17–21	(silver) Runner-up
2010	Uganda International	(Nigeria) Jinkan Ifraimu	(South Africa) Dorian Lance James (South Africa) Willem Viljoen	13–21, 9–21	(silver) Runner-up
2009	Mauritius International	(Nigeria) Jinkan Ifraimu	(South Africa) Dorian Lance James (South Africa) Willem Viljoen	21–19, 20–22, 8–21	(silver) Runner-up
2009	Kenya International	(Nigeria) Jinkan Ifraimu	(South Africa) Dorian Lance James (South Africa) Chris Dednam	14–21, 13–21	(silver) Runner-up
2008	Nigeria International	(Nigeria) Jinkan Ifraimu	(Nigeria) Akeem Ogunseye (Nigeria) Greg Orobosa Okuonghae	24–22, 17–21, 21–17	(silver) Runner-up
2008	Mauritius International	(Nigeria) Jinkan Ifraimu	(Nigeria) Greg Orobosa Okuonghae (Nigeria) Ibrahim Adamu	21–15, 21–17	(gold) Winner

Mixed doubles
Year	Tournament	Partner	Opponent	Score	Result
2014	Nigeria International	(Nigeria) Dorcas Adesokan	(Nigeria) Jinkan Ifraimu (Nigeria) Susan Ideh	11–8, 4–11, 11–7, 10–11, 8–11	(gold) Winner
2014	Uganda International	(Nigeria) Dorcas Adesokan	(Nigeria) Enejoh Abah (Nigeria) Tosin Atolagbe	15–21, 21–10, 21–18	(gold) Winner
2013	Nigeria International	(Nigeria) Dorcas Adesokan	(Nigeria) Enejoh Abah (Nigeria) Tosin Atolagbe	21–12, 21–17	(gold) Winner
2011	Botswana International	(Nigeria) Susan Ideh	(South Africa) Dorian Lance James (South Africa) Michelle Claire Edwards	16–21, 21–11, 19–21	(silver) Runner-up
2009	Mauritius International	(Nigeria) Grace Daniel	(Seychelles) Georgie Cupidon (Seychelles) Juliette Ah-Wan	21–17, 21–16	(gold) Winner
2002	Kenya International	(Nigeria) Grace Daniel	(Mauritius) Stephan Beeharry (Mauritius) Shama Aboobakar	7–2, 1–7, 2–7, 4–7	(silver) Runner-up

BWF International Challenge tournament
BWF International Series tournament
BWF Future Series tournament
