= Roelof Dednam =

South African badminton player (born 1985)

Personal information
- Born: Roelof Jakobus Dednam; 21 August 1985 (age 41) Bloemfontein, South Africa
- Height: 1.90 m (6 ft 3 in)
- Weight: 96 kg (212 lb)

Sport
- Country: South Africa
- Sport: Badminton

Men's singles & doubles
- Highest ranking: 340 (MS 1 April 2010); 157 (MD 29 October 2009); 185 (XD 26 August 2010)
- BWF profile
Medal record
Men's badminton
Representing South Africa
All-Africa Games
Gold medal – first place	2007 Algiers	Men's doubles
Silver medal – second place	2011 Maputo	Mixed team
Silver medal – second place	2007 Algiers	Mixed team
Bronze medal – third place	2007 Algiers	Mixed doubles
African Championships
Gold medal – first place	2007 Rose Hill	Men's doubles
Gold medal – first place	2006 Algiers	Men's doubles
Gold medal – first place	2006 Algiers	Mixed team
Silver medal – second place	2010 Kampala	Mixed doubles
Silver medal – second place	2007 Rose Hill	Mixed team
Africa Team Championships
Silver medal – second place	2008 Rose Hill	Men's team
Bronze medal – third place	2010 Kampala	Men's team

Roelof Jakobus Dednam (born 21 August 1985) is a male badminton player from South Africa. Dednam played badminton at the 2008 Summer Olympics in men's doubles with Chris Dednam, losing in the round of 16 to Howard Bach and Bob Malaythong of the United States.

== Achievements ==
=== All Africa Games ===
Men's doubles
Year	Venue	Partner	Opponent	Score	Result
2007	Salle OMS El Biar; Algiers, Algeria	(South Africa) Chris Dednam	(South Africa) Dorian James (South Africa) Willem Viljoen	21–10, 21–15	Gold

Mixed doubles
Year	Venue	Partner	Opponent	Score	Result
2007	Salle OMS El Biar; Algiers, Algeria	(South Africa) Michelle Edwards	(Seychelles) Georgie Cupidon (Seychelles) Juliette Ah-Wan	17–21, 21–19, 13–21	Bronze

=== African Championships ===
Men's doubles
Year	Venue	Partner	Opponent	Score	Result
2007	Stadium Badminton Rose Hill; Rose Hill, Mauritius	(South Africa) Chris Dednam	(Seychelles) Georgie Cupidon (Seychelles) Steve Malcouzane	21–17, 21–16	Gold
2006	Algiers, Algeria	(South Africa) Chris Dednam	(South Africa) Dorian James (South Africa) Willem Viljoen		Gold

Mixed doubles
Year	Venue	Partner	Opponent	Score	Result
2010	Sharing Youth Center; Kampala, Uganda	(South Africa) Annari Viljoen	(South Africa) Dorian James (South Africa) Michelle Edwards	13–21, 14–21	Silver

=== BWF International Challenge/Series ===
Men's singles
Year	Tournament	Opponent	Score	Result
2008	South Africa International	(Brazil) Daniel Paiola	21–23, 21–18, 18–21	(silver) Runner-up

Men's doubles
Year	Tournament	Partner	Opponent	Score	Result
2010	South Africa International	(South Africa) Chris Dednam	(South Africa) Dorian James (South Africa) Willem Viljoen	21–14, 21–18	(gold) Winner
2008	South Africa International	(South Africa) Chris Dednam	(South Africa) Dorian James (South Africa) Willem Viljoen	16–21, 17–21	(silver) Runner-up
2007	South Africa International	(South Africa) Chris Dednam	(South Africa) Dorian James (South Africa) Willem Viljoen	12–21, 18–21	(silver) Runner-up
2007	Mauritius International	(South Africa) Chris Dednam	(Germany) Jochen Cassel (Germany) Thomas Tesche	13–21, 14–21	(silver) Runner-up
2006	Mauritius International	(South Africa) Chris Dednam	(South Africa) Dorian James (South Africa) Willem Viljoen	13–21, 21–23	(silver) Runner-up
2005	South Africa International	(South Africa) Chris Dednam	(Nigeria) Ibrahim Adamu (Nigeria) Greg Okuonghae	7–15, 15–3, 15–10	(gold) Winner
2005	Kenya International	(South Africa) Chris Dednam	(Czech Republic) Jan Fröhlich (Czech Republic) Jan Vondra	11–15, 4–15	(silver) Runner-up

BWF International Challenge tournament
BWF International Series tournament
BWF Future Series tournament
