= Grace Daniel =

Nigerian Badminton player

Personal information
- Born: Grace Kubi Daniel; 24 February 1984 (age 42)
- Height: 1.76 m (5 ft 9 1/2 in)
- Weight: 70 kg (154 lb)

Sport
- Country: Nigeria
- Sport: Badminton
- Handedness: Right
- Highest ranking: 94
- Current ranking: 215 (21 February 2013)
- BWF profile
Medal record
Women's badminton
Representing Nigeria
All-Africa Games
Gold medal – first place	2011 Maputo	Mixed team
Gold medal – first place	2007 Algiers	Women's singles
Gold medal – first place	2007 Algiers	Mixed team
Gold medal – first place	2003 Abuja	Women's singles
Silver medal – second place	2007 Algiers	Women's doubles
Silver medal – second place	2007 Algiers	Mixed doubles
Silver medal – second place	2003 Abuja	Women's doubles
Silver medal – second place	2003 Abuja	Mixed team
Bronze medal – third place	2011 Maputo	Women's doubles
Bronze medal – third place	2011 Maputo	Mixed doubles
Bronze medal – third place	2003 Abuja	Mixed doubles
African Championships
Silver medal – second place	2012 Addis Ababa	Women's doubles
Silver medal – second place	2011 Marrakesh	Mixed team
Bronze medal – third place	2011 Marrakesh	Mixed doubles
Africa Team Championships
Silver medal – second place	2012 Addis Ababa	Women's team
Silver medal – second place	2008 Rose Hill	Women's team
Bronze medal – third place	2010 Kampala	Women's team

Grace Kubi Daniel (born 24 February 1984) is a Nigerian badminton player. She defeated South Africa's Michelle Claire Edwards for the gold medal in the women's singles, and also, teamed up with Susan Ideh for a silver in the doubles at the 2007 All-Africa Games in Algiers, Algeria.

Daniel qualified for the women's singles at the 2008 Summer Olympics in Beijing, after she was ranked eighty-ninth in the world, and awarded a continental spot for Africa by the Badminton World Federation. She lost the first preliminary round match to Czech Republic's Kristina Ludíková, with a score of 13–21 and 8–21.

== Achievements ==
=== African Games ===
Women's singles
Year	Venue	Opponent	Score	Result
2007	Algiers, Algeria	(South Africa) Michelle Edwards	21–16, 21–14	Gold
2003	Abuja, Nigeria	(South Africa) Michelle Edwards		Gold

Women's doubles
Year	Venue	Partner	Opponent	Score	Result
2011	Maputo, Mozambique	(Nigeria) Fatima Azeez	(Seychelles) Camille Allisen (Seychelles) Cynthia Course	22–24, 15–21	Bronze
2007	Algiers, Algeria	(Nigeria) Susan Ideh	(South Africa) Michelle Edwards (South Africa) Chantal Botts	12–21, 21–9, 20–22	Silver
2003	Abuja, Nigeria	(Nigeria) Susan Ideh	(South Africa) Michelle Edwards (South Africa) Chantal Botts		Silver

Mixed doubles
Year	Venue	Partner	Opponent	Score	Result
2011	Maputo, Mozambique	(Nigeria) Ibrahim Adamu	(South Africa) Willem Viljoen (South Africa) Annari Viljoen	10–21, 11–21	Bronze
2007	Algiers, Algeria	(Nigeria) Greg Okuonghae	(Seychelles) Georgie Cupidon (Seychelles) Juliette Ah-Wan	14–21, 17–21	Silver
2003	Abuja, Nigeria	(Nigeria) Greg Okuonghae	(South Africa)		Bronze

=== African Championships ===
Women's singles
Year	Venue	Opponent	Score	Result
2007	Rose Hill, Mauritius	(South Africa) Kerry-Lee Harrington	21–16, 21–16	Gold
2002	Casablanca, Morocco	(Seychelles) Juliette Ah-Wan	3–7, 4–7, 3–7	Silver
2000	Bauchi, Nigeria	(South Africa) Chantal Botts	11–5, 12–13, 5–11	Bronze

Women's doubles
Year	Venue	Partner	Opponent	Score	Result
2012	Arat Kilo Hall, Addis Ababa, Ethiopia	(Nigeria) Susan Ideh	(South Africa) Annari Viljoen (South Africa) Michelle Edwards	16–21, 19–21	Silver
2009	Nairobi, Kenya	(Nigeria) Mary Gideon	(South Africa) Stacey Doubell (South Africa) Kerry-Lee Harrington	21–16, 21–15	Gold
2007	Rose Hill, Mauritius	(Mauritius) Karen Foo Kune	(South Africa) Michelle Edwards (South Africa) Chantal Botts	19–21, 12–21	Silver
2004	Rose Hill, Mauritius	(Nigeria) Miriam Sude	(South Africa) Michelle Edwards (South Africa) Chantal Botts		Silver
2002	Casablanca, Morocco	(Nigeria) Miriam Sude	(South Africa) Michelle Edwards (South Africa) Chantal Botts		Silver
2000	Bauchi, Nigeria	(Nigeria) Miriam Sude	(Mauritius) Anusha Dajee (Mauritius) Selvon Marudamuthu	13–15, 15–6, 15–4	Gold

Mixed Doubles
Year	Venue	Partner	Opponent	Score	Result
2011	Marrakesh, Morocco	(Nigeria) Ibrahim Adamu	(South Africa) Dorian James (South Africa) Michelle Edwards	15–21, 16–21	Bronze
2009	Nairobi, Kenya	(Nigeria) Ola Fagbemi	(Seychelles) Georgie Cupidon (Seychelles) Juliette Ah-Wan	18–21, 22–20, 21–16	Gold
2004	Rose Hill, Mauritius	(Nigeria) Greg Okuonghae	(Mauritius) Stephan Beeharry (Mauritius) Shama Aboobakar	15–9, 11–15, 15–9	Gold
2000	Bauchi, Nigeria	(Nigeria) Ocholi Edicha	(Mauritius) Denis Constantin (Mauritius) Selvon Marudamuthu	14–17, 17–15, 7–15	Bronze

=== BWF International Challenge/Series ===
Women's singles
Year	Tournament	Opponent	Score	Result
2009	Mauritius International	(Seychelles) Juliette Ah-Wan	21–13, 21–17	(gold) Winner
2008	Nigeria International	(China) Xu Bingxin	17–21, 21–9, 6–21	(silver) Runner-up
2008	Mauritius International	(Spain) Yoana Martínez	21–15, 21–18	(gold) Winner
2006	Nigeria International	(Italy) Agnese Allegrini		(silver) Runner-up
2005	South Africa International	(Mauritius) Amrita Sawaram	11–3, 11–2	(gold) Winner
2002	Nigeria International	(Nigeria) Kuburat Mumini	13–11, 11–7	(gold) Winner
2002	Kenya International	(Mauritius) Karen Foo Kune	7–0, 7–5, 7–4	(gold) Winner

Women's doubles
Year	Tournament	Partner	Opponent	Score	Result
2006	Mauritius International	(Mauritius) Karen Foo Kune	(South Africa) Chantal Botts (South Africa) Kerry-Lee Harrington		(gold) Winner

Mixed doubles
Year	Tournament	Partner	Opponent	Score	Result
2009	Mauritius International	(Nigeria) Ola Fagbemi	(Seychelles) Georgie Cupidon (Seychelles) Juliette Ah-Wan	21–17, 21–16	(gold) Winner
2008	Nigeria International	(Nigeria) Greg Okuonghae	(Nigeria) Akeem Ogunseye (Nigeria) Mary Gideon	21–13, 21–13	(gold) Winner
2008	Kenya International	(Nigeria) Greg Okuonghae	(Uganda) Wilson Tukire (Uganda) Mega Nankabirwa	21–8, 21–17	(gold) Winner
2006	Mauritius International	(Nigeria) Greg Okuonghae	(Seychelles) Georgie Cupidon (Seychelles) Juliette Ah-Wan		(gold) Winner
2005	South Africa International	(Nigeria) Greg Okuonghae	(South Africa) Dorian James (South Africa) Michelle Edwards	15–13, 12–15, 13–15	(silver) Runner-up
2002	Kenya International	(Nigeria) Ola Fagbemi	(Mauritius) Stephan Beeharry (Mauritius) Shama Aboobakar	7–2, 1–7, 2–7, 4–7	(silver) Runner-up

BWF International Challenge tournament
BWF International Series tournament
BWF Future Series tournament
