= Antoinette Uys =

South African badminton player (born 1976)

Personal information
- Born: 2 March 1976 (age 50) Durban, South Africa
- Height: 1.76 m (5 ft 9 in)
- Weight: 78 kg (172 lb)

Sport
- Country: South Africa
- Sport: Badminton
- BWF profile
Medal record
Women's badminton
Representing South Africa
All-Africa Games
Gold medal – first place	2003 Abuja	Mixed doubles
Gold medal – first place	2003 Abuja	Mixed team
Bronze medal – third place	2003 Abuja	Women's doubles
African Championships
Gold medal – first place	2002 Casablanca	Mixed doubles
Gold medal – first place	2002 Casablanca	Mixed team

Antoinette Uys (born 2 March 1976) is a badminton player from South Africa. She was the mixed doubles gold medalists at the 2002 African Championships and 2003 All-Africa Games. Uys competed in badminton at the 2004 Summer Olympics in the mixed doubles with partner Chris Dednam. They lost to Tsai Chia-Hsin and Cheng Wen-Hsing of Chinese Taipei in the round of 32.

== Achievements ==
=== All-Africa Games ===
Women's doubles
Year	Venue	Partner	Opponent	Score	Result
2003	Indoor Sports Halls National Stadium; Abuja, Nigeria	(South Africa) Marika Daubern			Bronze

Mixed doubles
Year	Venue	Partner	Opponent	Score	Result
2003	Indoor Sports Halls National Stadium; Abuja, Nigeria	(South Africa) Chris Dednam	(South Africa) Stewart Carson (South Africa) Michelle Edwards		Gold

=== African Championships ===
Mixed doubles
Year	Venue	Partner	Opponent	Score	Result
2002	Casablanca, Morocco	(South Africa) Chris Dednam	(South Africa) Johan Kleingeld (South Africa) Chantal Botts		Gold

=== IBF International ===
Women's doubles
Year	Tournament	Partner	Opponent	Score	Result
2002	South Africa International	(South Africa) Marika Daubern	(South Africa) Chantal Botts (South Africa) Michelle Edwards	2–7, 6–8, 2–7	(silver) Runner-up

Mixed doubles
Year	Tournament	Partner	Opponent	Score	Result
2002	South Africa International	(South Africa) Chris Dednam	(South Africa) Dean Potgieter (South Africa) Chantal Botts	5–7, 1–7, 7–2, –, –	(gold) Winner
2001	South Africa International	(South Africa) Anton Kriel	(South Africa) Johan Kleingeld (South Africa) Karen Coetzer	Walkover	(silver) Runner-up
1999	South Africa International	(South Africa) Stewart Carson	(South Africa) Johan Kleingeld (South Africa) Karen Coetzer	7–15, 8–15	(silver) Runner-up
