= Abimbola Odejoke =

Nigerian badminton player (born 1980)

Personal information
- Born: 14 November 1980 (age 45)

Sport
- Country: Nigeria
- Sport: Badminton
- BWF profile
Medal record
Men's badminton
Representing Nigeria
All-Africa Games
Gold medal – first place	2007 Algiers	Mixed team
Silver medal – second place	2003 Abuja	Men's doubles
Silver medal – second place	2003 Abuja	Mixed team
Bronze medal – third place	2003 Abuja	Mixed doubles
African Championships
Gold medal – first place	2002 Casablanca	Men's singles
Gold medal – first place	2000 Bauchi	Mixed doubles
Silver medal – second place	2004 Rose Hill	Men's doubles
Silver medal – second place	2002 Casablanca	Mixed team
Silver medal – second place	2000 Bauchi	Men's doubles
Bronze medal – third place	2002 Casablanca	Men's doubles
Bronze medal – third place	2002 Casablanca	Mixed doubles
Bronze medal – third place	2000 Bauchi	Men's singles

Abimbola Odejoke (born 14 November 1980) is a Nigerian badminton player. He won the silver medals in the men's doubles and mixed team event, also the bronze medal in mixed doubles event at the 2003 All-Africa Games. Odejoke then claimed the gold medal with the National team at the 2007 All-Africa Games.

== Achievements ==
=== All-Africa Games ===
Men's doubles
Year	Venue	Partner	Opponent	Score	Result
2003	Indoor Sports Halls National Stadium; Abuja, Nigeria	(Nigeria) Dotun Akinsanya	(Nigeria) Greg Okunghae (Nigeria) Ibrahim Adamu	–, –	Silver

Mixed doubles
Year	Venue	Partner	Opponent	Score	Result
2003	Indoor Sports Halls National Stadium; Abuja, Nigeria	(Nigeria) Susan Ideh	(South Africa)	–, –	Bronze

=== African Championships ===
Men's singles
Year	Venue	Opponent	Score	Result
2002	Casablanca, Morocco	(Nigeria) Dotun Akinsanya	Walkover	Gold
2000	Multi-Purpose Sports Hall; Bauchi, Nigeria	(Mauritius) Denis Constantin	17–15, 13–15, 5–15	Bronze

Men's doubles
Year	Venue	Partner	Opponent	Score	Result
2004	National Badminton Centre; Rose Hill, Mauritius	(Nigeria) Dotun Akinsanya	(South Africa) Chris Dednam (South Africa) Johan Kleingeld	2–15, 6–15	Silver
2002	Casablanca, Morocco	(Nigeria) Dotun Akinsanya	(South Africa) Chris Dednam (South Africa) Johan Kleingeld	5–7, 6–8, Retired	Bronze
2000	Multi-Purpose Sports Hall; Bauchi, Nigeria	(Nigeria) Dotun Akinsanya	(Mauritius) Denis Constantin (Mauritius) Édouard Clarisse	2–15, 8–15	Silver

Mixed doubles
Year	Venue	Partner	Opponent	Score	Result
2002	Casablanca, Morocco	(Nigeria) Prisca Azuine	(South Africa) Chris Dednam (South Africa) Antoinette Uys	1–7, 7–8, 0–7	Bronze
2000	Multi-Purpose Sports Hall; Bauchi, Nigeria	(Nigeria) Bridget Ibenero	(Mauritius) Denis Constantin (Mauritius) Selvon Marudamuthu	5–15, 17–16, 15–12	Gold

=== IBF International ===
Men's singles
Year	Tournament	Opponent	Score	Result
2002	Mauritius International	(Germany) Conrad Hückstädt	13–15, 3–15	(silver) Runner-up
