= Amrita Sawaram =

Mauritian badminton player

Personal information
- Born: 13 August 1980 (age 46) Moka, Mauritius
- Height: 1.55 m (5 ft 1 in)
- Weight: 43 kg (95 lb)

Sport
- Country: Mauritius
- Sport: Badminton
- Handedness: Right
- Event: Women's singles & doubles

Women's singles & doubles
- BWF profile
Medal record
Women's badminton
Representing Mauritius
All-Africa Games
Bronze medal – third place	2003 Abuja	Mixed team
African Championships
Gold medal – first place	2000 Bauchi	Women's singles
Bronze medal – third place	2010 Kampala	Women's doubles
Bronze medal – third place	2010 Kampala	Mixed doubles
Bronze medal – third place	2006 Algiers	Women's doubles
Bronze medal – third place	2006 Algiers	Mixed team
Bronze medal – third place	2004 Rose Hill	Women's singles
Bronze medal – third place	2004 Rose Hill	Women's doubles
Bronze medal – third place	1998 Rose Hill	Women's doubles
Africa Team Championships
Silver medal – second place	2006 Rose Hill	Women's team

Amrita Sawaram (born 13 August 1980) is a Mauritian badminton player. She won the gold medal at the 2000 African Championships in the women's singles event, made her as the first Mauritian female to win that competition. Sawaram competed at the 2000 Summer Olympics in Sydney, Australia in the women's singles and doubles event. Sawaram also represented her country in three consecutive Commonwealth Games in 1998, 2002, and 2006.

== Achievements ==
=== African Championships ===
Women's singles
Year	Venue	Opponent	Score	Result
2004	Beau Bassin-Rose Hill, Mauritius	(South Africa) Michelle Edwards	5–11, 1–11	Bronze
2000	Bauchi, Nigeria	(South Africa) Chantal Botts	11–9, 11–3	Gold

Women's doubles
Year	Venue	Partner	Opponent	Score	Result
2010	Kampala, Uganda	(Mauritius) Marlyse Marquer	(South Africa) Annari Viljoen (South Africa) Michelle Edwards	8–21, 11–21	Bronze
2006	Algiers, Algeria	(Mauritius) Karen Foo Kune	(South Africa) Stacey Doubell (South Africa) Michelle Edwards		Bronze
2004	Beau Bassin-Rose Hill, Mauritius	(Mauritius) Karen Foo Kune			Bronze
1998	Beau Bassin-Rose Hill, Mauritius	(Mauritius) Selvon Marudamuthu	(South Africa) Meagen Burnett (South Africa) Michelle Edwards	1–15, 1–15	Bronze

Mixed doubles
Year	Venue	Partner	Opponent	Score	Result
2010	Kampala, Uganda	(Mauritius) Stephan Beeharry	(South Africa) Roelof Dednam (South Africa) Annari Viljoen	13–21, 8–21	Bronze

=== BWF International Challenge/Series ===
Women's singles
Year	Tournament	Opponent	Score	Result
2005	South Africa International	(Nigeria) Grace Daniel	3–11, 2–11	(silver) Runner-up
2005	Kenya International	(India) Trupti Murgunde	0–11, 1–11	(silver) Runner-up
2002	Mauritius International	(South Africa) Michelle Edwards	1–11, 3–11	(silver) Runner-up
2001	Mauritius International	(South Africa) Michelle Edwards	1–7, 2–7, 5–7	(silver) Runner-up
2001	South Africa International	(South Africa) Michelle Edwards	0–11, 7–11	(silver) Runner-up
1999	South Africa International	(South Africa) Meagen Burnett	3–11, 3–11	(silver) Runner-up

Women's doubles
Year	Tournament	Partner	Opponent	Score	Result
2010	Mauritius International	(Mauritius) Shama Aboobakar	(Australia) Leisha Cooper (Mauritius) Yeldi Louison		(silver) Runner-up
2009	Mauritius International	(Mauritius) Shama Aboobakar	(Nigeria) Susan Ideh (Seychelles) Juliette Ah-Wan	18–21, 17–21	(silver) Runner-up
2005	South Africa International	(Mauritius) Shama Aboobakar	(South Africa) Chantal Botts (South Africa) Michelle Edwards	5–15, 7–15	(silver) Runner-up
2005	Kenya International	(Mauritius) Shama Aboobakar	(Uganda) Fiona Nakalema (Uganda) Fiona Ssozi	Walkover	(gold) Winner

Mixed doubles
Year	Tournament	Partner	Opponent	Score	Result
2005	Kenya International	(Mauritius) Eddy Clarisse	(Mauritius) Stephan Beeharry (Mauritius) Shama Aboobakar	17–16, 15–7	(gold) Winner
