= Chris Dednam =

South African badminton player (born 1983)

Personal information
- Full name: Christoffel Cornelius Dednam
- Born: 8 August 1983 (age 43) Bloemfontein, Free State, South Africa
- Height: 1.80 m (5 ft 11 in)
- Weight: 86 kg (190 lb)

Sport
- Country: South Africa
- Sport: Badminton

Men's singles & doubles
- Highest ranking: 327 (MS 22 October 2009); 130 (MD 15 October 2010; 144 (XD 15 October 2009)
- BWF profile
Medal record
Men's badminton
Representing South Africa
All-Africa Games
Gold medal – first place	2007 Algiers	Men's doubles
Gold medal – first place	2003 Abuja	Mixed doubles
Gold medal – first place	2003 Abuja	Mixed team
Silver medal – second place	2007 Algiers	Mixed team
Bronze medal – third place	2003 Abuja	Men's doubles
African Championships
Gold medal – first place	2009 Nairobi	Mixed team
Gold medal – first place	2007 Rose Hill	Men's doubles
Gold medal – first place	2006 Algiers	Men's doubles
Gold medal – first place	2006 Algiers	Mixed team
Gold medal – first place	2004 Rose Hill	Men's doubles
Gold medal – first place	2004 Rose Hill	Mixed team
Gold medal – first place	2002 Casablanca	Mixed doubles
Gold medal – first place	2002 Casablanca	Mixed team
Silver medal – second place	2009 Nairobi	Men's doubles
Silver medal – second place	2007 Rose Hill	Mixed doubles
Silver medal – second place	2007 Rose Hill	Mixed team
Silver medal – second place	2002 Casablanca	Men's doubles
Bronze medal – third place	2012 Addis Ababa	Men's doubles
Bronze medal – third place	2007 Rose Hill	Men's singles
Bronze medal – third place	2006 Algiers	Men's singles
Bronze medal – third place	2004 Rose Hill	Men's singles
Africa Team Championships
Gold medal – first place	2012 Addis Ababa	Men's team
Gold medal – first place	2006 Rose Hill	Men's team
Silver medal – second place	2008 Rose Hill	Men's team

Christoffel Cornelius Dednam (born 8 August 1983) is a badminton player from South Africa. Dednam was the gold medallists at the 2003 All-Africa Games in the mixed doubles event, and in 2007 in the men's doubles event. He competed at the 2004, 2008 Olympic Games, and at the 2006 Commonwealth Games. Dednam played badminton at the 2004 Summer Olympics in men's singles, losing in the round of 32 to Boonsak Ponsana of Thailand. He also competed in mixed doubles with partner Antoinette Uys. They lost to Tsai Chia-Hsin and Cheng Wen-Hsing of Chinese Taipei in the round of 32. At the 2008 Olympics, he played in the men's doubles event with his brother Roelof Dednam, but the duo was defeated by Howard Bach and Khan Bob Malaythong of United States in the first round.

== Achievements ==
=== All-Africa Games ===
Men's doubles
Year	Venue	Partner	Opponent	Score	Result
2007	Salle OMS El Biar; Algiers, Algeria	(South Africa) Roelof Dednam	(South Africa) Dorian James (South Africa) Willem Viljoen	21–10, 21–15	Gold
2003	Indoor Sports Halls National Stadium; Abuja, Nigeria	(South Africa) Johan Kleingeld	(Nigeria) Greg Okuonghae (Nigeria) Ibrahim Adamu		Bronze

Mixed doubles
Year	Venue	Partner	Opponent	Score	Result
2003	Indoor Sports Halls National Stadium; Abuja, Nigeria	(South Africa) Antoinette Uys	(South Africa) Stewart Carson (South Africa) Michelle Edwards		Gold

=== African Championships ===
Men's singles
Year	Venue	Opponent	Score	Result
2007	Stadium Badminton Rose Hill; Rose Hill, Mauritius	(Zambia) Eli Mambwe	18–21, 23–21, 22–24	Bronze
2006	Algiers, Algeria			Bronze
2004	National Badminton Centre; Rose Hill, Mauritius	Olivier Fossy	12–15, 12–15	Bronze

Men's doubles
Year	Venue	Partner	Opponent	Score	Result
2012	Arat Kilo Hall; Addis Ababa, Ethiopia	(South Africa) Enrico James	(Nigeria) Jinkan Bulus (Nigeria) Ola Fagbemi	8–21, 19–21	Bronze
2009	Moi International Sports Complex; Nairobi, Kenya	(South Africa) Dorian James	(Nigeria) Jinkan Bulus (Nigeria) Ola Fagbemi	13–21, 14–21	Silver
2007	Stadium Badminton Rose Hill; Rose Hill, Mauritius	(South Africa) Roelof Dednam	(Seychelles) Georgie Cupidon (Seychelles) Steve Malcouzane	21–17, 21–16	Gold
2006	Algiers, Algeria	(South Africa) Roelof Dednam	(South Africa) Dorian James (South Africa) Willem Viljoen		Gold
2004	National Badminton Centre; Rose Hill, Mauritius	(South Africa) Johan Kleingeld	(Nigeria) Dotun Akinsanya (Nigeria) Abimbola Odejoke	15–2, 15–6	Gold
2002	Casablanca, Morocco	(South Africa) Johan Kleingeld	(Mauritius) Stephan Beeharry (Mauritius) Denis Constantin		Silver

Mixed doubles
Year	Venue	Partner	Opponent	Score	Result
2007	Stadium Badminton Rose Hill; Rose Hill, Mauritius	(South Africa) Michelle Edwards	(Seychelles) Georgie Cupidon (Seychelles) Juliette Ah-Wan	16–21, 21–11, 15–21	Silver
2002	Casablanca, Morocco	(South Africa) Antoinette Uys	(South Africa) Johan Kleingeld (South Africa) Chantal Botts		Gold

=== BWF International Challenge/Series ===
Men's singles
Year	Tournament	Opponent	Score	Result
2001	South Africa International	(Mauritius) Denis Constantin	6–15, 4–15	(silver) Runner-up

Men's doubles
Year	Tournament	Partner	Opponent	Score	Result
2011	South Africa International	(South Africa) Enrico James	(South Africa) Dorian James (South Africa) Willem Viljoen	19–21, 18–21	(silver) Runner-up
2010	South Africa International	(South Africa) Roelof Dednam	(South Africa) Dorian James (South Africa) Willem Viljoen	21–14, 21–18	(gold) Winner
2009	Kenya International	(South Africa) Dorian James	(Nigeria) Jinkan Ifraimu (Nigeria) Ola Fagbemi	21–14, 21–13	(gold) Winner
2008	South Africa International	(South Africa) Roelof Dednam	(South Africa) Dorian James (South Africa) Willem Viljoen	16–21, 17–21	(silver) Runner-up
2007	South Africa International	(South Africa) Roelof Dednam	(South Africa) Dorian James (South Africa) Willem Viljoen	12–21, 18–21	(silver) Runner-up
2007	Mauritius International	(South Africa) Roelof Dednam	(Germany) Jochen Cassel (Germany) Thomas Tesche	13–21, 14–21	(silver) Runner-up
2006	Mauritius International	(South Africa) Roelof Dednam	(South Africa) Dorian James (South Africa) Willem Viljoen	13–21, 21–23	(silver) Runner-up
2005	South Africa International	(South Africa) Roelof Dednam	(Nigeria) Ibrahim Adamu (Nigeria) Greg Okuonghae	7–15, 15–3, 15–10	(gold) Winner
2005	Kenya International	(South Africa) Roelof Dednam	(Czech Republic) Jan Fröhlich (Czech Republic) Jan Vondra	11–15, 4–15	(silver) Runner-up
2002	South Africa International	(South Africa) Johan Kleingeld	(South Africa) Stewart Carson (South Africa) Dorian James	7–7, 7–0, 7–5	(gold) Winner

Mixed doubles
Year	Tournament	Partner	Opponent	Score	Result
2011	South Africa International	(South Africa) Annari Viljoen	(South Africa) Enrico James (South Africa) Stacey Doubell	22–20, 11–21, 21–14	(gold) Winner
2010	South Africa International	(South Africa) Annari Viljoen	(South Africa) Dorian James (South Africa) Michelle Edwards	14–21, 21–10, 21–13	(gold) Winner
2009	Kenya International	(South Africa) Michelle Edwards	(South Africa) Dorian James (South Africa) Annari Viljoen	21–11, 21–13	(gold) Winner
2008	South Africa International	(South Africa) Michelle Edwards	(Mauritius) Stephan Beeharry (Mauritius) Shama Aboobakar	21–17, 21–12	(gold) Winner
2008	Mauritius International	(South Africa) Annari Viljoen	(South Africa) Dorian James (South Africa) Michelle Edwards	16–21, 21–15, 11–21	(silver) Runner-up
2007	South Africa International	(South Africa) Annari Viljoen	(South Africa) Willem Viljoen (South Africa) Jade Morgan	21–14, 12–21, 21–15	(gold) Winner
2007	Mauritius International	(South Africa) Michelle Edwards	(Seychelles) Georgie Cupidon (Seychelles) Juliette Ah-Wan	21–9, 21–17	(gold) Winner
2002	South Africa International	(South Africa) Antoinette Uys	(South Africa) Dean Potgieter (South Africa) Chantal Botts	5–5, 7–1, 7–2	(gold) Winner

BWF International Challenge tournament
BWF International Series tournament
BWF Future Series tournament
