= Juliette Ah-Wan =

Seychellois badminton player (born 1981)

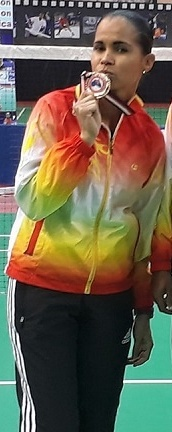
- Juliette Ah-Wan, 2018 African Badminton Championships

Personal information
- Born: Juliette Chantal Ah-Wan; 29 April 1981 (age 45) Victoria, Seychelles
- Height: 1.55 m (5 ft 1 in)
- Weight: 50 kg (110 lb; 7.9 st)

Sport
- Country: Seychelles
- Sport: Badminton
- Handedness: Right
- Event: Women's singles & doubles

Women's singles & doubles
- BWF profile
Medal record
Women's badminton
Representing Seychelles
All-Africa Games
Gold medal – first place	2015 Brazzaville	Women's doubles
Gold medal – first place	2007 Algiers	Mixed doubles
Bronze medal – third place	2015 Brazzaville	Mixed doubles
Bronze medal – third place	2015 Brazzaville	Mixed team
Bronze medal – third place	2007 Algiers	Mixed team
Bronze medal – third place	2003 Abuja	Women's singles
Bronze medal – third place	2003 Abuja	Women's doubles
Bronze medal – third place	2003 Abuja	Mixed team
African Championships
Gold medal – first place	2018 Algiers	Women's doubles
Gold medal – first place	2013 Rose Hill	Women's doubles
Gold medal – first place	2009 Nairobi	Women's singles
Gold medal – first place	2007 Rose Hill	Mixed doubles
Gold medal – first place	2007 Rose Hill	Mixed team
Gold medal – first place	2006 Algiers	Women's singles
Gold medal – first place	2006 Algiers	Mixed doubles
Gold medal – first place	2002 Casablanca	Women's singles
Silver medal – second place	2014 Gaborone	Women's doubles
Silver medal – second place	2009 Nairobi	Mixed doubles
Silver medal – second place	2009 Nairobi	Mixed team
Silver medal – second place	2006 Algiers	Women's doubles
Bronze medal – third place	2014 Gaborone	Mixed team
Bronze medal – third place	2013 Rose Hill	Mixed team
Bronze medal – third place	2010 Kampala	Women's doubles
Bronze medal – third place	2009 Nairobi	Women's doubles
Bronze medal – third place	2007 Rose Hill	Women's doubles
Bronze medal – third place	2006 Algiers	Mixed team
Bronze medal – third place	2004 Rose Hill	Women's doubles
Bronze medal – third place	2004 Rose Hill	Mixed team
Bronze medal – third place	2002 Casablanca	Women's doubles
Africa Team Championships
Bronze medal – third place	2006 Rose Hill	Women's team

Juliette Chantal Ah-Wan (born 29 April 1981) is a badminton player from Seychelles. Born in Victoria, Seychelles, Ah-Wan debuted in 1995 at the age of 14. In 2007, she awarded as Sportslady of the Year. Ah-Wan has competed in some international tournament, including 2008 Summer Olympics, and Commonwealth Games from 2002–2018.

== Achievements ==
=== All-Africa Games ===
Women's singles
Year	Venue	Opponent	Score	Result
2003	Indoor Sports Halls National Stadium; Abuja, Nigeria			Bronze

Women's doubles
Year	Venue	Partner	Opponent	Score	Result
2015	Gymnase Étienne Mongha; Brazzaville, Republic of the Congo	(Seychelles) Allisen Camille	(Mauritius) Kate Foo Kune (Mauritius) Yeldy Louison	22–20, 18–21, 21–14	Gold
2003	Indoor Sports Halls National Stadium; Abuja, Nigeria	(Seychelles) Shirley Etienne			Bronze

Mixed doubles
Year	Venue	Partner	Opponent	Score	Result
2015	Gymnase Étienne Mongha; Brazzaville, Republic of the Congo	(Seychelles) Georgie Cupidon	(South Africa) Andries Malan (South Africa) Jennifer Fry	15–21, 18–21	Bronze
2007	Salle OMS El Biar; Algiers, Algeria	(Seychelles) Georgie Cupidon	(Nigeria) Greg Okuonghae (Nigeria) Grace Daniel	21–14, 21–17	Gold

=== African Championships ===
Women's singles
Year	Venue	Opponent	Score	Result
2009	Nairobi, Kenya	(South Africa) Stacey Doubell	21–15, 21–7	Gold
2006	Algiers, Algeria	(South Africa) Stacey Doubell	21–10, 21–12	Gold
2002	Casablanca, Morocco	(Nigeria) Grace Daniel	7–3, 7–4, 7–3	Gold

Women's doubles
Year	Venue	Partner	Opponent	Score	Result
2018	Salle OMS Harcha Hacéne, Algiers, Algeria	(Seychelles) Allisen Camille	(Egypt) Doha Hany (Egypt) Hadia Hosny	21–18, 13–21, 21–18	Gold
2014	Lobatse Stadium, Gaborone, Botswana	(Seychelles) Allisen Camille	(Mauritius) Kate Foo Kune (Mauritius) Yeldy Louison	17–21, 20–22	Silver
2013	National Badminton Centre, Rose Hill, Mauritius	(Seychelles) Allisen Camille	(Mauritius) Shama Aboobakar (Mauritius) Yeldy Louison	18–21, 21–16, 21–14	Gold
2010	Kampala, Uganda	(Seychelles) Allisen Camille	(Nigeria) Maria Braimoh (Nigeria) Susan Ideh	15–21, 11–21	Bronze
2009	Nairobi, Kenya	(Seychelles) Catherina Paulin	(South Africa) Stacey Doubell (South Africa) Kerry-Lee Harrington	19–21, 21–19, 17–21	Bronze
2007	Rose Hill, Mauritius	(Seychelles) Catherina Paulin	(South Africa) Chantal Botts (South Africa) Michelle Edwards	17–21, 19–21	Bronze
2006	Algiers, Algeria	(Seychelles) Catherina Paulin	(South Africa) Michelle Edwards (South Africa) Stacey Doubell	12–21, 21–23	Silver
2004	Rose Hill, Mauritius	(Seychelles) Shirley Etienne			Bronze
2002	Casablanca, Morocco	(Seychelles) Catherina Paulin	(Nigeria) Grace Daniel (Nigeria) Miriam Sude	2–7, 3–7, 5–7	Bronze

Mixed doubles
Year	Venue	Partner	Opponent	Score	Result
2009	Nairobi, Kenya	(Seychelles) Georgie Cupidon	(Nigeria) Ola Fagbemi (Nigeria) Grace Daniel	21–18, 20–22, 16–21	Silver
2007	Rose Hill, Mauritius	(Seychelles) Georgie Cupidon	(South Africa) Chris Dednam (South Africa) Michelle Edwards	21–16, 11–21, 21–15	Gold
2006	Algiers, Algeria	(Seychelles) Georgie Cupidon	(South Africa) Dorian James (South Africa) Michelle Edwards	21–16, 17–21, 21–16	Gold

=== BWF International Challenge/Series ===
Women's singles
Year	Tournament	Opponent	Score	Result
2009	Mauritius International	(Nigeria) Grace Daniel	13–21, 17–21	(silver) Runner-up
1999	Kenya International	(Kenya) Rose Wanjala	11–2, 13–11	(gold) Winner

Women's doubles
Year	Tournament	Partner	Opponent	Score	Result
2009	Mauritius International	(Nigeria) Susan Ideh	(Mauritius) Shama Aboobakar (Mauritius) Amrita Sawaram	21–18, 21–17	(gold) Winner

Mixed doubles
Year	Tournament	Partner	Opponent	Score	Result
2009	Mauritius International	(Seychelles) Georgie Cupidon	(Nigeria) Ola Fagbemi (Nigeria) Grace Daniel	17–21, 16–21	(silver) Runner-up
2007	Mauritius International	(Seychelles) Georgie Cupidon	(South Africa) Chris Dednam (South Africa) Michelle Edwards	9–21, 17–21	(silver) Runner-up
2006	Mauritius International	(Seychelles) Georgie Cupidon	(Nigeria) Greg Okuonghae (Nigeria) Grace Daniel	17–21, 20–22	(silver) Runner-up
2001	Mauritius International	(Seychelles) Georgie Cupidon	(Mauritius) Stephan Beeharry (Mauritius) Shama Aboobakar	2–7, 3–7, 8–7	(silver) Runner-up
1999	Kenya International	(Seychelles) Georgie Cupidon	(Seychelles) Steve Malcouzane (Seychelles) Lucia Banane	15–10, 15–6	(gold) Winner

BWF International Challenge tournament
BWF International Series tournament
BWF Future Series tournament
