= Kenya International =

Badminton championships

- Sport: Badminton
- Founder: Kenya Badminton Association
- Country: Kenya

The Kenya International is an annual open international badminton tournament held in Kenya. This tournament is organised by the Kenya Badminton Association, with the sanctioned by the Badminton Confederation of Africa (BCA) and Badminton World Federation (BWF).

== History ==
In 1965, badminton is already played by the Kenyan people, when the Kenya Gazette implied the change of the name of Nairobi Badminton Association to Kenya Badminton Association. This tournament is one of the oldest badminton tournament in Africa, and established before the BCA was founded in 1977, which the former All England Open champion, Punch Gunalan of Malaysia, won the men's doubles title in 1972. In 2006, the tournament was a Future Series event, and since 2009 upgrading to International Series with the total prize money $5,000. In 2008, the tournament was held at the Premier Club in Nairobi, with players from ten countries compete. In 2009, it was held at the Moi Sports Centre, Kasarani, simultaneously with African Badminton Championships. The Moi Sports Centre continues to host the tournament, and in 2014, was moved to Safaricom Stadium Kasarani.

== Tournament winners ==
Year	Men's singles	Women's singles	Men's doubles	Women's doubles	Mixed doubles
1985	(Kenya) Peter Netu	(Kenya) Salma Ali	(Kenya) Vijai Maini (Kenya) Amjid Rasul	(Kenya) Janetta Keenan (Kenya) Naila Valani	(Kenya) Amjid Rasul (Kenya) Salma Ali
1986	(India) T. R. Rajan	(Kenya) Christine Joshi	(India) T. R. Rajan (India) Owen Roncon	(Kenya) Christine Joshi (Kenya) Gail D'Souza	(Kenya) N. K. Shah (Kenya) Naila Valani
1987– 1988	No competition				
1989	(Kenya) Satish Narasimhan	(Kenya) Christine Joshi	(Kenya) Vijai Maini (Morocco) Adelhafid Sedk	(Kenya) Christine Joshi (Kenya) Fatma Juma	(Kenya) C. N. Waweru (Kenya) M. Wangari
1990	(Mauritius) Geenesh Dussain	(Mauritius) Vandanah Seesurun	(Mauritius) Geenesh Dussain (Mauritius) Jean-Michel Duverge	(Mauritius) Vandanah Seesurun (Mauritius) Martine de Souza	(Mauritius) Geenesh Dussain (Mauritius) Vandanah Seesurun
1991	(Nigeria) Agarawu Tunde	(Mauritius) Martine de Souza	(Nigeria) Danjuma Fatauchi (Nigeria) Sesan Gbajobi	(Nigeria) Obiageli Olorunsola (Nigeria) Dayo Oyewusi	(Nigeria) Sesan Gbajobi (Nigeria) Obiageli Olorunsola
1992	(Kenya) Simon Kihara	(Kenya) Anna Nganga	(Kenya) Simon Kihara (Kenya) Tom Manda	(Kenya) Christine Joshi (Kenya) Fatma Juma	(Kenya) Tom Manda (Kenya) Jasmin Nzambu
1993	No competition				
1994	(Tanzania) Mehul Joshi	(Uganda) Annet Nakamya	(Kenya) Abraham Wogute (Kenya) Fred Gituku	(Kenya) Anna Nganga (Uganda) Edith Wamalwa	(Uganda) Frank Nsubuga (Uganda) Edith Wamalwa
1995	(Uganda) Frank Nsubuga	(Uganda) Annet Nakamya	(Uganda) Frank Nsubuga (Tanzania) Mehul Joshi	(Uganda) Annet Nakamya (Uganda) Helen Luziika	(Uganda) Frank Nsubuga (Uganda) Edith Wamalwa
1996	(Kenya) Abraham Wogute	(Uganda) Helen Luziika	(Kenya) Abraham Wogute (Kenya) Fred Gituku	(Uganda) Annet Nakamya (Uganda) Helen Luziika	(Kenya) Abraham Wogute (Kenya) Monica Githii
1997	No competition				
1998	(Kenya) Abraham Wogute	(Seychelles) Sandra Moses	(Kenya) Abraham Wogute (Kenya) Fred Gituku	(Uganda) Annet Nakamya (Uganda) Helen Luziika	(Kenya) Abraham Wogute (Kenya) Monica Githii
1999	(France) Bertrand Gallet	(Seychelles) Juliette Ah-Wan	(France) Bertrand Gallet (Kenya) Robert Mbugua	no data	(Seychelles) Georgie Cupidon (Seychelles) Juliette Ah-Wan
2000	No competition				
2001	(France) Sydney Lengagne	(Kenya) Ann Maina	(Kenya) ? (Kenya) ?	no data	
2002	(Nigeria) Ola Fagbemi	(Nigeria) Grace Daniel	(Mauritius) Stephan Beeharry (Mauritius) Hyder Aboobakar	(Mauritius) Karen Foo Kune (Mauritius) Anusha Dajee	(Mauritius) Stephan Beeharry (Mauritius) Shama Aboobakar
2003– 2004	No competition				
2005	(India) Abhinn Shyam Gupta	(India) Trupti Murgunde	(Czech Republic) Jan Fröhlich (Czech Republic) Jan Vondra	(Mauritius) Shama Aboobakar (Mauritius) Amrita Sawaram	(Mauritius) Eddy Clarisse (Mauritius) Amrita Sawaram
2006	(Wales) Richard Vaughan	(Zambia) Ogar Siamupangila	(Uganda) Abraham Wogute (Uganda) Edwin Ekiring	no data	(Uganda) Abraham Wogute (Uganda) Rita Namusisi
2007	(Nigeria) Greg Okuonghae	(United States) Shannon Pohl	(Nigeria) Abraham Otagada (Nigeria) Ocholi Edicha	(Zambia) Delphine Nakanyika (Zambia) Ogar Siamupangila	(Nigeria) Greg Okuonghae (Zambia) Ogar Siamupangila
2008	(India) Chetan Anand	(Portugal) Ana Moura	(Seychelles) Georgie Cupidon (Seychelles) Steve Malcouzane	(South Africa) Michelle Edwards (South Africa) Chantal Botts	(Nigeria) Greg Okuonghae (Nigeria) Grace Daniel
2009	(Iran) Ali Shahhosseini	(Egypt) Dina Nagy	(South Africa) Dorian James (South Africa) Chris Dednam	(India) Dhanya Nair (India) Anita Ohlan	(South Africa) Chris Dednam (South Africa) Michelle Edwards
2010	(India) Oscar Bansal	(Greece) Anne Hald Jensen	(South Africa) Dorian James (South Africa) Wiaan Viljoen	(South Africa) Anna Viljoen (South Africa) Michelle Edwards	(South Africa) Wiaan Viljoen (South Africa) Anna Viljoen
2011	(Russia) Vladimir Malkov	(Turkey) Özge Bayrak	(India) Manu Attri (India) Jishnu Sanyal	(Turkey) Özge Bayrak (Turkey) Neslihan Yiğit	(Vietnam) Lê Hà Anh (Vietnam) Lê Thu Huyền
2012	No competition				
2013	(India) Subhankar Dey	(Nigeria) Grace Gabriel	(Nigeria) Enejoh Abah (Nigeria) Victor Makanju	(Nigeria) Grace Gabriel (Nigeria) Dorcas Ajoke Adesokan	(Kenya) Patrick Kinyua (Kenya) Mercy Joseph
2014	(Iran) Farzin Khanjani	(Italy) Jeanine Cicognini	(Iran) Soroush Eskandari (Iran) Hasan Motaghi	(Iran) Negin Amiripour (Iran) Pegah Kamrani	(Zambia) Donald Mabo (Zambia) Ogar Siamupangila
2015– 2018	No competition				
2019	(India) B. M. Rahul Bharadwaj	(Myanmar) Thet Htar Thuzar	(Algeria) Koceila Mammeri (Algeria) Youcef Sabri Medel	(Lithuania) Vytaute Fomkinaite (Lithuania) Gerda Voitechovskaja	(Jordan) Bahaedeen Ahmad Alshannik (Jordan) Domou Amro
2020	(India) Chirag Sen	(India) Aakarshi Kashyap	(India) Kathiravun Concheepuran Manivannan (India) Santhosh Gajendran	(Egypt) Doha Hany (Egypt) Hadia Hosny	(Egypt) Adham Hatem Elgamal (Egypt) Doha Hany
2021	Cancelled (Note: This tournament, originally to be played from 4–7 March, was later cancelled due to COVID-19 pandemic in Kenya.)				

== Performances by nation ==
Top Nations
Pos	Nation	MS	WS	MD	WD	XD	Total
1	Kenya	4	3	6	1.5	4	18.5
2	Nigeria	3	2	3	2	2.5	12.5
3	Uganda	1	3	1.5	3.5	3	12
4	India	6	2	2	1	0	11
4	Mauritius	1	2	2	3	3	11
6	South Africa	0	0	2	2	2	6
7	Iran	2	0	1	1	0	4
7	Seychelles	0	2	1	0	1	4
9	Zambia	0	1	0	1	1.5	3.5
10	Egypt	0	1	0	1	1	3
11	France	2	0	0.5	0	0	2.5
12	Turkey	0	1	0	1	0	2
13	Tanzania	1	0	0.5	0	0	1.5
14	Algeria	0	0	1	0	0	1
14	Czech Republic	0	0	1	0	0	1
14	Greece	0	1	0	0	0	1
14	Italy	0	1	0	0	0	1
14	Jordan	0	0	0	0	1	1
14	Lithuania	0	0	0	1	0	1
14	Myanmar	0	1	0	0	0	1
14	Portugal	0	1	0	0	0	1
14	Russia	1	0	0	0	0	1
14	United States	0	1	0	0	0	1
14	Vietnam	0	0	0	0	1	1
14	Wales	1	0	0	0	0	1
26	Morocco	0	0	0.5	0	0	0.5
Total		22	22	22	18	20	104
