= Denis Constantin =

Mauritian badminton player

Personal information
- Born: 29 July 1980 (age 46) Curepipe, Plaines Wilhems District, Mauritius
- Height: 1.84 m (6 ft 0 in)
- Weight: 72 kg (159 lb)

Sport
- Country: Australia
- Sport: Badminton
- Event: Men's singles & doubles

Men's singles & doubles
- BWF profile
Medal record
Men's badminton
Representing Mauritius
African Championships
Gold medal – first place	2002 Casablanca	Men's doubles
Gold medal – first place	2000 Bauchi	Men's singles
Gold medal – first place	2000 Bauchi	Men's doubles
Silver medal – second place	2000 Bauchi	Mixed doubles
Bronze medal – third place	2002 Casablanca	Men's singles
Bronze medal – third place	2002 Casablanca	Mixed team
Bronze medal – third place	1998 Rose Hill	Men's singles
Bronze medal – third place	1998 Rose Hill	Men's doubles

Denis Constantin (born 29 July 1980) is a former Mauritian badminton player, and later represented Australia. He was the men's singles gold medallist at the 2000 African Championships, and in the men's doubles event partnered with Eddy Clarisse. He then defend the men's doubles gold in 2002 partnered with Stephan Beeharry. Constantin competed for Mauritius at the 1998, and 2002 Commonwealth Games, also at the 2000 Summer Olympics. He was awarded Athlete of the Month by the Mauritius Sports Council in June 2001. Constantin graduated from the La Trobe University in Melbourne, and now work as physiotherapists.

== Achievements ==
=== African Championships ===
Men's singles
Year	Venue	Opponent	Score	Result
2002	Casablanca, Morocco	(Nigeria) Abimbola Odejoke	5–7, 6–8, 7–2	Bronze
2000	Bauchi, Nigeria	(Nigeria) Ola Fagbemi	15–11, 15–8	Gold
1998	Beau Bassin-Rose Hill, Mauritius	(South Africa) Johan Kleingeld	15–8, 4–15, 6–15	Bronze

Men's doubles
Year	Venue	Partner	Opponent	Score	Result
2002	Casablanca, Morocco	(Mauritius) Stephan Beeharry	(South Africa) Johan Kleingeld (South Africa) Chris Dednam		Gold
2000	Bauchi, Nigeria	(Mauritius) Eddy Clarisse	(Nigeria) Dotun Akinsanya (Nigeria) Abimbola Odejoke	15–2, 15–8	Gold
1998	Beau Bassin-Rose Hill, Mauritius	(Mauritius) Stephan Beeharry	(South Africa) Gavin Polmans (South Africa) Neale Woodroffe	6–15, 15–10, 15–17	Bronze

Mixed doubles
Year	Venue	Partner	Opponent	Score	Result
2000	Bauchi, Nigeria	(Mauritius) Selvon Marudamuthu	(Nigeria) Abimbola Odejoke (Nigeria) Bridget Ibenero	15–5, 16–17, 12–15	Silver

=== IBF International ===
Men's singles
Year	Tournament	Opponent	Score	Result
2001	South Africa International	(South Africa) Chris Dednam	15–6, 15–4	(gold) Winner

Men's doubles
Year	Tournament	Partner	Opponent	Score	Result
2001	South Africa International	(Mauritius) Stephan Beeharry	(Mauritius) Geenesh Dussain (Mauritius) Yogeshsingh Mahadnac	15–13, 17–16	(gold) Winner
1999	Fiji International	(Australia) Peter Blackburn	(New Zealand) Geoffrey Bellingham (New Zealand) Daniel Shirley	15–13, 15–12	(gold) Winner
