= Chantal Botts =

South African badminton player

Personal information
- Born: 30 March 1976 (age 50) Witbank, Mpumalanga, South Africa
- Height: 1.65 m (5 ft 5 in)
- Weight: 75 kg (165 lb)

Sport
- Country: South Africa
- Sport: Badminton
- Event: Women's singles & doubles

Women's singles & doubles
- BWF profile
Medal record
Women's badminton
Representing South Africa
All-Africa Games
Gold medal – first place	2003 Abuja	Women's doubles
Gold medal – first place	2003 Abuja	Mixed team
Gold medal – first place	2007 Algiers	Women's doubles
Silver medal – second place	2007 Algiers	Mixed team
Bronze medal – third place	2003 Abuja	Women's singles
African Championships
Gold medal – first place	2002 Casablanca	Women's doubles
Gold medal – first place	2002 Casablanca	Mixed team
Gold medal – first place	2004 Rose Hill	Women's doubles
Gold medal – first place	2004 Rose Hill	Mixed team
Gold medal – first place	2007 Rose Hill	Women's doubles
Silver medal – second place	2000 Bauchi	Women's singles
Silver medal – second place	2002 Casablanca	Mixed doubles
Silver medal – second place	2004 Rose Hill	Women's singles
Silver medal – second place	2007 Rose Hill	Mixed team
Bronze medal – third place	2000 Bauchi	Women's doubles
Africa Team Championships
Gold medal – first place	2008 Rose Hill	Women's team

Chantal Botts (born 30 March 1976) is a South African badminton player. Botts was the gold medallist in the women's doubles event at the 2003 and 2007 All-Africa Games. She represented South Africa at the 2004 and 2008 Olympic Games partnered with Michelle Edwards.

== Achievements ==
=== All Africa Games ===
Women's singles
Year	Venue	Opponent	Score	Result
2003	Indoor Sports Halls National Stadium, Abuja, Nigeria			Bronze

Women's doubles
Year	Venue	Partner	Opponent	Score	Result
2003	Indoor Sports Halls National Stadium; Abuja, Nigeria	(South Africa) Michelle Edwards	(Nigeria) Grace Daniel (Nigeria) Susan Ideh		Gold
2007	Salle OMS El Biar; Algiers, Algeria	(South Africa) Michelle Edwards	(Nigeria) Grace Daniel (Nigeria) Susan Ideh	21–12, 9–21, 22–20	Gold

=== African Championships ===
Women's singles
Year	Venue	Opponent	Score	Result
2000	Multi-Purpose Sports Hall, Bauchi, Nigeria	(Mauritius) Amrita Sawaram	9–11, 3–11	Silver
2004	National Badminton Centre, Rose Hill, Mauritius	(South Africa) Michelle Edwards	4–11, 2–11	Silver

Women's doubles
Year	Venue	Partner	Opponent	Score	Result
2000	Multi-Purpose Sports Hall; Bauchi, Nigeria	(South Africa) Karen Coetzer	(Nigeria) Grace Daniel (Nigeria) Miriam Sude	15–6, 4–15, 13–15	Bronze
2002	Mohammed V Indoor Sport Complex; Casablanca, Morocco	(South Africa) Michelle Edwards	(Nigeria) Grace Daniel (Nigeria) Miriam Sude		Gold
2004	National Badminton Centre; Rose Hill, Mauritius	(South Africa) Michelle Edwards	(Nigeria) Grace Daniel (Nigeria) Miriam Sude		Gold
2007	Stadium Badminton Rose Hill; Rose Hill, Mauritius	(South Africa) Michelle Edwards	(Nigeria) Grace Daniel (Mauritius) Karen Foo Kune	21–19, 21–12	Gold

Mixed doubles
Year	Venue	Partner	Opponent	Score	Result
2002	Mohammed V Indoor Sport Complex; Casablanca, Morocco	(South Africa) Johan Kleingeld	(South Africa) Chris Dednam (South Africa) Antoinette Uys		Silver

=== BWF International Challenge/Series ===
Women's singles
Year	Tournament	Opponent	Score	Result
1996	Mauritius International	(England) Justine Willmott	4–11, 2–11	(silver) Runner-up
2000	South Africa International	(South Africa) Michelle Edwards	4–11, 0–11	(silver) Runner-up

Women's doubles
Year	Tournament	Partner	Opponent	Score	Result
1999	South Africa International	(South Africa) Linda Montignies	(South Africa) Meagen Burnett (South Africa) Karen Coetzer	17–14, 15–5	(gold) Winner
2001	South Africa International	(South Africa) Michelle Edwards	(South Africa) Marika Daubern (South Africa) Beverley Meerholz	15–1, 15–13	(gold) Winner
2002	South Africa International	(South Africa) Michelle Edwards	(South Africa) Marika Daubern (South Africa) Antoinette Uys	7–2, 8–6, 7–2	(gold) Winner
2005	South Africa International	(South Africa) Michelle Edwards	(Mauritius) Shama Aboobakar (Mauritius) Amrita Sawaram	15–5, 15–7	(gold) Winner
2006	Mauritius International	(South Africa) Kerry-Lee Harrington	(Nigeria) Grace Daniel (Mauritius) Karen Foo Kune	15–21, 22–24	(silver) Runner-up
2007	Mauritius International	(South Africa) Michelle Edwards	(Portugal) Ana Moura (Slovenia) Maja Tvrdy	16–21, 18–21	(silver) Runner-up
2007	South Africa International	(South Africa) Michelle Edwards	(South Africa) Jade Morgan (South Africa) Annari Viljoen	21–23, 18–21	(silver) Runner-up
2008	Mauritius International	(South Africa) Michelle Edwards	(South Africa) Stacey Doubell (South Africa) Kerry-Lee Harrington	21–7, 17–21, 21–14	(gold) Winner
2008	Kenya International	(South Africa) Michelle Edwards		21–14, 21–8	(gold) Winner
2008	South Africa International	(South Africa) Michelle Edwards	(South Africa) Jade Morgan (South Africa) Annari Viljoen	12–21, 16–21	(silver) Runner-up

Mixed doubles
Year	Tournament	Partner	Opponent	Score	Result
2002	South Africa International	(South Africa) Dean Potgieter	(South Africa) Chris Dednam (South Africa) Antoinette Uys	7–5, 1–7, 2–7	(silver) Runner-up

BWF International Challenge tournament

BWF International Series tournament
BWF Future Series tournament
