= Dotun Akinsanya =

Nigerian badminton player

Personal information
- Born: 20 January 1981 (age 45)
- Height: 1.63 m (5 ft 4 in)

Sport
- Country: Nigeria
- Sport: Badminton
- Handedness: Right
- BWF profile
Medal record
Men's badminton
Representing Nigeria
All-Africa Games
Gold medal – first place	2007 Algiers	Mixed team
Silver medal – second place	2003 Abuja	Men's doubles
Silver medal – second place	2003 Abuja	Mixed team
Bronze medal – third place	2003 Abuja	Men's singles
African Championships
Gold medal – first place	2004 Rose Hill	Men's singles
Silver medal – second place	2004 Rose Hill	Men's doubles
Silver medal – second place	2002 Casablanca	Men's singles
Silver medal – second place	2002 Casablanca	Mixed team
Silver medal – second place	2000 Bauchi	Men's doubles
Bronze medal – third place	2002 Casablanca	Men's doubles

Dotun Akinsanya (born 20 January 1981) is a Nigerian badminton player. He won the silver medals in the men's doubles and mixed team event, also the bronze medal in the men's singles at the 2003 All-Africa Games. Akinsanya later captured the gold medal in 2007 All-Africa Games in the mixed team event.

In 2002, he represented his country at the 2002 Manchester Commonwealth Games. In 2003, he received a scholarship from the Olympic Solidarity's Youth Development Program with a partnership with International Badminton Federation, for preparations of talented youngsters for future Olympic Games, specifically the Beijing 2008 Olympics. Although won the 2004 African Championships, he failed to qualify at the 2004 Olympic Games, after his world ranking down to South African player.

== Achievements ==
=== All-Africa Games ===
Men's singles
Year	Venue	Opponent	Score	Result
2003	Indoor Sports Halls National Stadium; Abuja, Nigeria		–, –	Bronze

Men's doubles
Year	Venue	Partner	Opponent	Score	Result
2003	Indoor Sports Halls National Stadium; Abuja, Nigeria	(Nigeria) Abimbola Odejoke	(Nigeria) Greg Okunghae (Nigeria) Ibrahim Adamu	–, –	Silver

=== African Championships ===
Men's singles
Year	Venue	Opponent	Score	Result
2004	National Badminton Centre; Rose Hill, Mauritius	(Réunion) Olivier Fossy	5–15, 15–10, 15–6	Gold
2002	Casablanca, Morocco	(Nigeria) Abimbola Odejoke	Walkover	Silver

Men's doubles
Year	Venue	Partner	Opponent	Score	Result
2004	National Badminton Centre; Rose Hill, Mauritius	(Nigeria) Abimbola Odejoke	(South Africa) Chris Dednam (South Africa) Johan Kleingeld	2–15, 6–15	Silver
2002	Casablanca, Morocco	(Nigeria) Abimbola Odejoke	(South Africa) Chris Dednam (South Africa) Johan Kleingeld	5–7, 6–8, Retired	Bronze
2000	Multi-Purpose Sports Hall; Bauchi, Nigeria	(Nigeria) Abimbola Odejoke	(Mauritius) Denis Constantin (Mauritius) Édouard Clarisse	2–15, 8–15	Silver

=== IBF International ===
Men's doubles
Year	Tournament	Partner	Opponent	Score	Result
2002	Nigeria International	(Nigeria) Ocholi Edicha	(Japan) Yuichi Ikeda (Japan) Shoji Sato	3–15, 1–15	(silver) Runner-up
