= Badminton at the 2007 All-Africa Games =

Badminton at the 2007 All-Africa Games was held from July 13 to July 19, 2007 in Algiers, Algeria.

== Venue ==
- Salle OMS El Biar, El Biar (Algiers)

== Medalists ==
Event	Gold	Silver	Bronze
Men's singles	(Algeria) Nabil Lasmari	(Zambia) Eli Mambwe	(Algeria) Karim Rezig
Men's singles	(Algeria) Nabil Lasmari	(Zambia) Eli Mambwe	(Uganda) Edwin Ekiring
Women's singles	(Nigeria) Grace Daniel	(South Africa) Michelle Edwards	(Seychelles) Catherina Paulin
Women's singles	(Nigeria) Grace Daniel	(South Africa) Michelle Edwards	(South Africa) Stacy Doubell
Men's doubles	(South Africa) Roelof Dednam and Chris Dednam	(South Africa) Dorian Lance James and Willem Viljoen	(Nigeria) Greg Okunghae and Ibrahim Adamu
Men's doubles	(South Africa) Roelof Dednam and Chris Dednam	(South Africa) Dorian Lance James and Willem Viljoen	(Nigeria) Jinkan Ifraimu and Ocholi Edicha
Women's doubles	(South Africa) Michelle Edwards and Chantal Botts	(Nigeria) Grace Daniel and Susan Ideh	(Egypt) Hadia Hosny and Alaa Youssef
Women's doubles	(South Africa) Michelle Edwards and Chantal Botts	(Nigeria) Grace Daniel and Susan Ideh	(South Africa) Stacy Doubell and Kerry-Lee Harrington
Mixed doubles	(Seychelles) Georgie Cupidon and Juliette Ah-Wan	(Nigeria) Okuonghae Greg and Grace Daniel	(South Africa) Roelof Dednam and Michelle Edwards
Mixed doubles	(Seychelles) Georgie Cupidon and Juliette Ah-Wan	(Nigeria) Okuonghae Greg and Grace Daniel	(Zambia) Eli Mambwe and Ogar Siamupangila
Teams	Nigeria	South Africa	Seychelles
Teams	Nigeria	South Africa	Algeria

== Final results ==
Category	Winners	Runners-up	Score
Men's singles	(Algeria) Nabil Lasmari	(Zambia) Eli Mambwe	21–17, 21–13
Women's singles	(Nigeria) Grace Daniel	(South Africa) Michelle Edwards	21–16, 21–14
Men's doubles	(South Africa) Roelof Dednam & Christoffel Dednam	(South Africa) Dorian Lance James & Willem Viljoen	21–10, 21–15
Women's doubles	(South Africa) Michelle Edwards & Chantal Botts	(Nigeria) Grace Daniel & Susan Ideh	21–12, 9–21, 22–20
Mixed doubles	(Seychelles) Georgie Cupidon & Juliette Ah-Wan	(Nigeria) Greg Okuonghae & Grace Daniel	21–14, 21–17

== Medal count ==
Pos	Country	Gold	Silver	Bronze	Total
1	South Africa	2	3	3	8
2	Nigeria	2	2	2	6
3	Algeria	1	0	2	3
3	Seychelles	1	0	2	3
5	Zambia	0	1	1	2
6	Egypt	0	0	1	1
6	Uganda	0	0	1	1
