= Badminton at the African Games =

Badminton has been part of the African Games since 2003 in Abuja, Nigeria.

== History ==
Badminton made its debut in the African Games in 2003. The first six nations to compete in badminton at the Games were Nigeria, Egypt, South Africa, Kenya, Mauritius and Seychelles. Six main events were held, which were men's singles, women's singles, men's doubles, women's doubles, mixed doubles and the mixed team event. In the 2023 Games, the mixed team event was cancelled.

== Editions ==
Games	Year	City	Best nation
VIIII	2003	Abuja, Nigeria	Nigeria
IX	2007	Algiers, Algeria	South Africa
X	2011	Maputo, Mozambique	South Africa
XI	2015	Brazzaville, Republic of the Congo	South Africa
XII	2019	Rabat, Morocco	Nigeria
XIII	2023	Accra, Ghana	Algeria

== Events ==
Event	03	07	11	15	19	23	Years
Men's singles	X	X	X	X	X	X	6
Men's doubles	X	X	X	X	X	X	6
Women's singles	X	X	X	X	X	X	6
Women's doubles	X	X	X	X	X	X	6
Mixed doubles	X	X	X	X	X	X	6
Mixed team	X	X	X	X	X		5
Total	6	6	6	6	6	5	

== Participating nations ==
Nation	03	07	11	15	19	23	Years
Algeria		X	X	X	X	X	5
Benin					X	X	2
Botswana				X			1
Burkina Faso						X	1
Republic of the Congo			X	X		X	3
Democratic Republic of the Congo			X	X	X		3
Egypt	X	X	X	X	X	X	6
Eritrea					X	X	2
Ethiopia		X	X	X	X		4
Ghana		X	X				2
Guinea					X		1
Equatorial Guinea						X	1
Kenya	X		X	X	X		4
Mauritius	X	X	X	X	X	X	6
Morocco					X		1
Mozambique			X				1
Namibia		X					1
Nigeria	X	X	X	X	X	X	6
Senegal						X	1
Seychelles	X	X	X	X	X		5
South Africa	X	X	X	X	X	X	6
Togo					X	X	2
Tunisia					X		1
Uganda		X	X	X	X	X	5
Zambia					X	X	2
Number of nations	6	10	13	12	17	14	
Number of athletes							

== Winners ==
Year	Men's singles	Women's singles	Men's doubles	Women's doubles	Mixed doubles	Team
2003	(Nigeria) Edicha Ocholi	(Nigeria) Grace Daniel	(Nigeria) Greg Okuonghae (Nigeria) Ibrahim Adamu	(South Africa) Michelle Edwards (South Africa) Chantal Botts	(South Africa) Chris Dednam (South Africa) Antoinette Uys	South Africa
2007	(Algeria) Nabil Lasmari	(Nigeria) Grace Daniel	(South Africa) Roelof Dednam (South Africa) Chris Dednam	(South Africa) Michelle Edwards (South Africa) Chantal Botts	(Seychelles) Georgie Cupidon (Seychelles) Juliette Ah-Wan	Nigeria
2011	(South Africa) Jacob Maliekal	(Nigeria) Susan Ideh	(Nigeria) Ola Fagbemi (Nigeria) Jinkan Ifraimu	(South Africa) Stacey Doubell (South Africa) Annari Viljoen	(South Africa) Willem Viljoen (South Africa) Annari Viljoen	Nigeria
2015	(South Africa) Jacob Maliekal	(Mauritius) Kate Foo Kune	(South Africa) Andries Malan (South Africa) Willem Viljoen	(Seychelles) Juliette Ah-Wan (Seychelles) Allisen Camille	(South Africa) Andries Malan (South Africa) Jennifer Fry	Mauritius
2019	(Nigeria) Anuoluwapo Juwon Opeyori	(South Africa) Johanita Scholtz	(Mauritius) Aatish Lubah (Mauritius) Julien Paul	(Egypt) Doha Hany (Egypt) Hadia Hosny	(Algeria) Koceila Mammeri (Algeria) Linda Mazri	Nigeria
2023	(Nigeria) Anuoluwapo Juwon Opeyori	(South Africa) Johanita Scholtz	(Algeria) Koceila Mammeri (Algeria) Youcef Sabri Medel	(Uganda) Husina Kobugabe (Uganda) Gladys Mbabazi	(Algeria) Koceila Mammeri (Algeria) Tanina Mammeri	Not held

== Medal table ==
As of the 2023 edition

Rank	Nation	Gold	Silver	Bronze	Total
1	South Africa (RSA)	13	10	12	35
2	Nigeria (NGR)	11	13	21	45
3	Algeria (ALG)	4	2	2	8
4	Mauritius (MRI)	3	2	8	13
5	Seychelles (SEY)	2	2	9	13
6	Egypt (EGY)	1	3	10	14
7	Uganda (UGA)	1	2	4	7
8	Zambia (ZAM)	0	1	2	3
9	Ghana (GHA)	0	0	1	1
9	Kenya (KEN)	0	0	1	1
Totals (10 entries)		35	35	70	140
