= Anton Kriel =

South African badminton player (born 1964)

Personal information
- Nationality: South African
- Born: 11 September 1964 (age 60)

Sport
- Sport: Badminton

Anton Kriel (born 11 September 1964) is a South African badminton player. He competed in two events at the 1992 Summer Olympics.
