= Burundi national badminton team =

National badminton team representing Burundi

Burundi
- Association: Fédération Burundaise de Badminton (FBB)
- Confederation: BCA (Africa)
- President: Ndondo Francois

BWF ranking
- Current ranking: Unranked (2 April 2024)
- Highest ranking: 89 (1 July 2011)

The Burundi national badminton team (Kirundi: Ikipe y'igihugu ya badminton yo mu Burundi) represents Burundi in international badminton team competitions. The Burundian Federation of Badminton manages the national team.

In 2010, the Burundian Federation of Badminton sent its first few players to debut in the 2010 Thomas & Uber Cups Preliminaries for Africa and the Burundian women's team reached the semifinals. In 2012, the Burundian Federation of Badminton along with the national team were disbanded for a brief period of time due to the country being under political turmoil.

In 2021, Burundi partnered with the Badminton Confederation of Africa and joined the Shuttle Time program organized by the Badminton World Federation (BWF) to improve the presence of badminton in Burundi.

== History ==
Badminton first started in Burundi in the 1950s when the nation was still under colonial rule. The sport was then played by a small minority of white people in Bujumbura, and by Catholic priests in other parts of the country. The sport then spread its popularity to the city of Bubanza and the youth began to play badminton regularly outside football fields.

=== Men's team ===
The Burundian men's team first competed in the 2010 Thomas & Uber Cups Preliminaries for Africa. The team failed to advance further after being defeated by South Africa and Ghana in the group stage.

=== Women's team ===
The Burundian women's team debuted in the 2010 Thomas & Uber Cups Preliminaries for Africa. Although the team lost to South Africa in the group stage, they were able to advance further to the quarter-finals. The team then entered the semi-finals after Seychelles conceded a walkover to the team. The team then lost the semi-final tie to Egypt but won bronze in the event.

== Competitive record ==
=== Thomas Cup ===
Year	Round	Pos
1949 to 1961	Part of Belgium	
1964 to 2008	Did not enter	
2010	Did not qualify	
2012	Did not enter	
2014	Did not enter	
2016	Did not enter	
2018	Did not enter	
2020	Did not enter	
2022	Did not enter	
2024	Did not enter	
2026	Did not qualify	
2028	To be determined	
2030	To be determined	

=== Uber Cup ===
Year	Round	Pos
1957	Part of Belgium	
1960	Part of Belgium	
1963 to 2008	Did not enter	
2010	Did not qualify	
2012	Did not enter	
2014	Did not enter	
2016	Did not enter	
2018	Did not enter	
2020	Did not enter	
2022	Did not enter	
2024	Did not enter	
2026	Did not enter	
2028	To be determined	
2030	To be determined	

=== Sudirman Cup ===
Year	Round	Pos
1989 to 2023	Did not enter	
2025	To be determined	
2027	To be determined	
2029	To be determined	

=== African Games ===
==== Mixed team ====
Year	Round	Pos
2003	Did not enter	
2007	Did not enter	
2011	Did not enter	
2015	Did not enter	
2019	Did not enter	
2027	To be determined	

=== African Team Championships ===
==== Men's team ====
Year	Round	Pos
1979 to 2024	Did not enter	
2026	Group stage	12th
2028	To be determined	
2030	To be determined	

==== Women's team ====
Year	Round	Pos
1979 to 2026	Did not enter	
2028	To be determined	
2030	To be determined	

==== Mixed team ====
Year	Round	Pos
1980 to 2023	Did not enter	
2025	To be determined	
2027	To be determined	
2029	To be determined	

**Red border color indicates tournament was held on home soil.

== Junior competitive record ==
=== Suhandinata Cup ===
Year	Round	Pos
2000 to 2024	Did not enter	
2025	To be determined	

=== African Youth Games ===
==== Men's team ====
Year	Round	Pos
2018	Did not enter	

==== Women's team ====
Year	Round	Pos
2018	Did not enter	

==== Mixed team ====
Year	Round	Pos
2014	Did not enter	

=== African Junior Team Championships ===
==== Mixed team ====
Year	Round	Pos
1979 to 2016	Did not enter	
2021	Group stage	10th
2022	Did not enter	
2024	To be determined	

**Red border color indicates tournament was held on home soil.

== Staff ==
The following list shows the coaching staff for the national badminton team of Burundi.

Name	Role
(Burundi) Nicolas Bikorimana	Coach
(Burundi) Denis Nkurunziza	Coach
(Burundi) Chadrack Niyonkuru	Coach
(Burundi) Philemon Tuyihimbaze	Coach

== Players ==
=== Current squad ===
As of 2 January 2024

==== Men's team ====
Name	DoB/Age	Ranking of event		
Name	DoB/Age	MS	MD	XD
Patrick-Adonis Munezero	3 January 2004 (age 22)	-	-	-
Devy Marc Muvunyi	28 November 2004 (age 21)	-	-	-

==== Women's team ====
Name	DoB/Age	Ranking of event		
Name	DoB/Age	WS	WD	XD
Kelly-Janviere Iradukunda	20 September 2003 (age 22)	-	-	-
Berthila Niyomwungere	21 November 2008 (age 17)	-	-	-

=== Previous squads ===
- All Africa Men's Team Badminton Championships: 2010
- All Africa Women's Team Badminton Championships: 2010
