= Uganda national badminton team =

National badminton team representing Uganda

Uganda
- Association: Uganda Badminton Association (UBA)
- Confederation: BCA (Africa)
- President: Annet Nakamya

BWF ranking
- Current ranking: 40 ▼2 (2 April 2024)
- Highest ranking: 38 (2 January 2024)

Uber Cup
- Appearances: 1 (first in 2024)
- Best result: Group stage

African Mixed Team Championships
- Appearances: 9 (first in 2004)
- Best result: Semi-finals (2021)

African Men's Team Championships
- Appearances: 4 (first in 2016)
- Best result: Group stage

African Women's Team Championships
- Appearances: 4 (first in 2016)
- Best result: Runners-up (2022, 2024)

The Uganda national badminton team (Luganda: Ttiimu y'eggwanga eya Uganda eya badminton) represents Uganda in international badminton team competitions. It is controlled by the Uganda Badminton Association, the governing body for Ugandan badminton.

Formed in 1980, the team did not compete in any international team events until 2004 when the team made their first appearance in the 2004 African Badminton Championships mixed team event. The team made their first appearance at the Uber Cup in 2024.

== History ==
=== Men's team ===
In 1983, the team entered the 1984 Thomas Cup qualifying rounds in Ostend but did not participate.

In 2004, the team competed in the 2004 Thomas Cup African Qualifiers. The team failed to qualify after losing to Nigeria, Mauritius, South Africa. In 2008 and 2010, the team reached the quarter-finals of the Thomas Cup African qualifiers but lost 3–0 to Nigeria. In 2012, the team were eliminated in the group stage of the Thomas Cup African qualifiers.

In 2016, the team competed in the African Men's Team Championships. The team were drawn into Group B with Algeria and Ghana. The team were eliminated in the group stages after losing 5–0 to Algeria and 4–1 to Ghana. The team also did not advance further from the group stages in the African Men's Team Championships in 2022 and 2024.

=== Women's team ===
The team competed in qualifying for the Uber Cup in 2004. The team placed fourth in the round robin tie. In the 2010 Uber Cup African Qualifiers, the team lost in the quarter-finals to Seychelles. In 2012, the team were eliminated in the group stages of the African Uber Cup Qualifiers.

In 2016, the team reached the semi-finals of the African Women's Team Championships and lost 3–0 to Mauritius. In 2018, the team were eliminated in the group stages of the African Women's Team Championships. In the 2022 All Africa Women's Team Championships, the team defeated South Africa 3–0 to enter the final. In the final, the team lost 3–1 to Egypt.

In 2024, the team reached the finals of the African Women's Team Championships again after defeating Algeria 3–0 in the semi-final. In the final, the team lost 3–2 to South Africa. Due to South Africa's withdrawal from the 2024 Uber Cup, Uganda as runners-up of the 2024 African Women's Team Championships replaced South Africa as the only African representative in the final tournament, marking Uganda's debut in the Uber Cup. The team were drawn into Group C with Japan, Indonesia and Hong Kong. The team were eliminated in the group stages after losing 5–0 to all of their opponents in the group.

=== Mixed team ===
In 2004, Uganda competed in the 2004 African Badminton Championships mixed team event and were eliminated in the group stages. In 2006, the team competed in the 2006 Commonwealth Games mixed team event. The team failed to advance to the knockout stage. In the 2010 Commonwealth Games, the team were drawn into Group C with England, Canada, Mauritius and the Falkland Islands. The team first lost 5–0 to England and Canada then won 5–0 against the Falkland Islands. The team lost 4–1 in their last match to Mauritius.

In the 2014 Commonwealth Games, the team did not advance to the knockout stage after finishing third in their group. In 2021, the team were semi-finalists at the 2021 African Badminton Championships mixed team event. The team beat 4–1 in the quarter-finals but lost 3–0 to Egypt in the semi-finals.

=== Africa Air Badminton Championship ===
In 2024, Uganda won the first edition of Africa Air Badminton Championship in Mauritius, with players like Augustus Owinyi, Muzafaru, Fred Kadoli, Sharifah Mbabazi, Olivia Nakajja, and Malha Musa. In September 2026, Uganda hosted the 3rd edition of Africa Air Badminton Championship initially had to feature 14 countries in Africa, however was streamlined to 9 teams. Uganda was placed in Group C alongside Mauritius and Burkina Faso. While at the tournament, Uganda received early exit after losing to both teams to finish bottom of the group.

== Competitive record ==
=== Thomas Cup ===
Year	Round	Pos
1949 to 1961	Part of the United Kingdom	
1964 to 1982	Did not enter	
1984	Withdrew	
1986	Did not enter	
1988	Did not enter	
1990	Did not enter	
1992	Did not enter	
1994	Did not enter	
1996	Did not enter	
1998	Did not enter	
2000	Did not enter	
2002	Did not enter	
2004	Did not qualify	
2006	Did not enter	
2008	Did not qualify	
2010	Did not qualify	
2012	Did not qualify	
2014	Did not qualify	
2016	Did not qualify	
2018	Did not enter	
2020	Did not qualify	
2022	Did not qualify	
2024	Did not qualify	
2026	To be determined	
2028	To be determined	
2030	To be determined	

=== Uber Cup ===
Year	Round	Pos
1957	Part of the United Kingdom	
1960	Part of the United Kingdom	
1963 to 2002	Did not enter	
2004	Did not qualify	
2006	Did not enter	
2008	Did not enter	
2010	Did not qualify	
2012	Did not qualify	
2014	Did not qualify	
2016	Did not qualify	
2018	Did not qualify	
2020	Did not enter	
2022	Did not qualify	
2024	Group stage	16th
2026	To be determined	
2028	To be determined	
2030	To be determined	

=== Sudirman Cup ===
Year	Round	Pos
1989 to 2019	Did not enter	
2021	Did not qualify	
2023	Did not qualify	
2025	Did not qualify	
2027	To be determined	
2029	To be determined	

=== Commonwealth Games ===
==== Men's team ====
Year	Round	Pos
1998	Did not enter	

==== Women's team ====
Year	Round	Pos
1998	Did not enter	

==== Mixed team ====
Year	Round	Pos
1978 to 2002	Did not enter	
2006	Group stage	17th
2010	Group stage	14th
2014	Group stage	15th
2018	Group stage	13th
2022	Group stage	11th
2026	To be determined	

=== African Games ===
==== Mixed team ====
Year	Round	Pos
2003	Did not enter	
2007	Did not enter	
2011	Quarter-finals	6th
2015	Quarter-finals	7th
2019	Quarter-finals	7th
2023	TBD	

=== African Team Championships ===
==== Men's team ====
Year	Round	Pos
1979 to 1988	Did not enter	
2016	Group stage	6th
2018	Did not enter	
2020	Group stage	5th
2022	Group stage	7th
2024	Group stage	7th
2026	To be determined	
2028	To be determined	
2030	To be determined	

==== Women's team ====
Year	Round	Pos
1979 to 1988	Did not enter	
2016	Semi-finals	3rd
2018	Group stage	6th
2020	Did not enter	
2022	Runners-up	2nd
2024	Runners-up	2nd
2026	To be determined	
2028	To be determined	
2030	To be determined	

==== Mixed team ====
Year	Round	Pos
1980 to 2002	Did not enter	
2004	Group stage	5th
2006	Group stage	9th
2007	Did not enter	
2009	Group stage	5th
2011	Group stage	7th
2013	Did not enter	
2014	Did not enter	
2017	Group stage	7th
2019	Group stage	7th
2021	Semi-finals	4th
2023	Quarter-finals	6th
2025	Quarter-finals	6th
2027	To be determined	
2029	To be determined	

=== Islamic Solidarity Games ===
==== Men's team ====
Year	Round	Pos
2013	Withdrew	

==== Women's team ====
Year	Round	Pos
2013	Withdrew	

=== FISU World University Games ===
==== Mixed team ====
Year	Round	Pos
2007	Group stage	18th
2011	Did not enter	
2013	Did not enter	
2015	Group stage	19th
2017	Group stage	20th
2021	Did not enter	
2025	To be determined	

=== World University Team Championships ===
==== Mixed team ====
Year	Round	Pos
2008	Did not enter	
2010	Did not enter	
2012	Did not enter	
2014	Did not enter	
2016	Did not enter	
2018	Did not enter	

**Red border color indicates tournament was held on home soil.

== Junior competitive record ==
=== Suhandinata Cup ===
Year	Round	Pos
(China) 2000	Did not enter	
(South Africa) 2002	Did not enter	
(Canada) 2004	Did not enter	
(South Korea) 2006	Did not enter	
(New Zealand) 2007	Did not enter	
(India) 2008	Did not enter	
(Malaysia) 2009	Did not enter	
(Mexico) 2010	Did not enter	
(Taiwan) 2011	Did not enter	
(Japan) 2012	Did not enter	
(Thailand) 2013	Did not enter	
(Malaysia) 2014	Did not enter	
(Peru) 2015	Did not enter	
(Spain) 2016	Did not enter	
(Indonesia) 2017	Did not enter	
(Canada) 2018	Group stage	36th of 39
(Russia) 2019	Did not enter	
(New Zealand) 2020	Cancelled because of COVID-19 pandemic	
(China) 2021	Cancelled because of COVID-19 pandemic	
(Spain) 2022	Did not enter	
(United States) 2023	Did not enter	
(China) 2024	Group stage	37th of 39
(India) 2025	Group stage	35th of 36
(Egypt) 2026	Group stage	47th of 47

=== Commonwealth Youth Games ===
==== Mixed team ====
Year	Round	Pos
2004	Did not enter	

=== African Youth Games ===
==== Men's team ====
Year	Round	Pos
2018	Did not enter	

==== Women's team ====
Year	Round	Pos
2018	Did not enter	

==== Mixed team ====
Year	Round	Pos
2014	Did not enter	

=== African Junior Team Championships ===
==== Mixed team ====
Year	Round	Pos
1979 to 2001	Did not enter	
2003	Group stage	7th
2005	Group stage	6th
2007	Did not enter	
2009	Group stage	5th
2011	Withdrew	
2013	Did not enter	
2016	Group stage	
2021	Semi-finals	4th
2022	Semi-finals	4th
2024	Did not enter	
2026	Quarter-finals	5th

**Red border color indicates tournament was held on home soil.

== Players ==
=== Current squad ===
As of 2 January 2024

==== Men's team ====
Name	DoB/Age	Ranking of event		
Name	DoB/Age	MS	MD	XD
Brian Kasirye	3 September 2001 (age 25)	183	179	555
Muzafaru Lubega	8 May 2000 (age 26)	517	179	371
Expedito Emuddu	17 August 2003 (age 23)	845	283	494
Augustus Owinyi	24 May 1999 (age 27)	466	283	485
Kenneth Mwambu	23 March 2000 (age 26)	525	326	227
Abdul Swaburuh Ssempiri	28 November 2003 (age 22)	692	326	711
Amos Muyanja	10 April 2000 (age 26)	446	360	-
Thomas Katerega	30 May 2002 (age 24)	794	360	1138

==== Women's team ====
Name	DoB/Age	Ranking of event		
Name	DoB/Age	WS	WD	XD
Fadilah Mohamed Rafi	4 June 2005 (age 21)	116	105	494
Tracy Naluwooza	6 September 2006 (age 20)	230	105	227
Husina Kobugabe	21 March 2001 (age 25)	139	83	371
Gladys Mbabazi	1 May 1996 (age 30)	187	83	-
Kruthum Nalumansi	30 April 2002 (age 24)	416	220	563
Assumpta Owomugisha	10 June 2003 (age 23)	409	220	371
Swabra Nanyonbi	11 July 2004 (age 22)	-	-	711
Rajab Shamsa Mbira	19 April 2002 (age 24)	1134	589	1138

=== Previous squads ===
==== African Team Championships ====
- Men's team: 2022
- Women's team: 2022
