= Benin national badminton team =

National badminton team representing Benin

Benin
- Association: Fédération Béninoise de Badminton (FBBa)
- Confederation: BCA (Africa)
- President: Aubin Houndagnon Assogba

BWF ranking
- Current ranking: 104 ▲1 (2 January 2024)
- Highest ranking: 75 (3 January 2023)

African Mixed Team Championships
- Appearances: 1 (first in 2019)
- Best result: Group stage

African Men's Team Championships
- Appearances: 1 (first in 2022)
- Best result: Group stage

The Benin national badminton team (French: Équipe nationale Béninoise de badminton) represents Benin in international team competitions. The team is controlled by the Badminton Federation of Benin (French: Federation Beninoise de Badminton; FBB). The Beninese mixed team competed in the 2019 African Badminton Championships.

The men's team debuted in the All Africa Men's and Women's Team Badminton Championships in 2022.

== History ==
Badminton made its way to Benin in the 2010s when the sport was widely played in schools and in cities such as Cotonou. In 2011, the Beninese Badminton Federation was established and the national team was formed. In 2014, Benin became part of the Shuttle Time program organized by the Badminton World Federation to promote the sport in the country. The national team first competed internationally at the 2019 African Badminton Championships.

=== Men's team ===
The Beninese men's team first competed in the 2022 All Africa Men's Team Championships. The team were grouped with Algeria, Réunion and hosts Uganda. The team were eliminated in the group stages after losing all their matches against Algeria and Uganda. The team won one match against Réunion when Oswald Ash Fano-Dosh performed a surprising win against Aaron Assing with a score of 22–24, 21–18, 21–14.

=== Mixed team ===
The Beninese mixed team competed in the 2019 African Badminton Championships. The team lost 5–0 to Zambia and Mauritius and did not advance to the quarter-finals.

== Competitive record ==
=== Thomas Cup ===
Year	Round	Pos
1949 to 1958	Part of France	
1961 to 2020	Did not enter	
2022	Did not qualify	
2024	Did not enter	
2026	To be determined	
2028	To be determined	
2030	To be determined	

=== Uber Cup ===
Year	Round	Pos
1957	Part of France	
1960	Part of France	
1963 to 2024	Did not enter	
2026	To be determined	
2028	To be determined	
2030	To be determined	

=== Sudirman Cup ===
Year	Round	Pos
1989 to 2023	Did not enter	
2025	To be determined	
2027	To be determined	
2029	To be determined	

=== African Games ===
==== Mixed team ====
Year	Round	Pos
2003	Did not enter	
2007	Did not enter	
2011	Did not enter	
2015	Did not enter	
2019	Did not enter	
2027	To be determined	

=== African Team Championships ===
==== Men's team ====
Year	Round	Pos
1979 to 2020	Did not enter	
2022	Group stage	10th
2024	Did not enter	
2026	To be determined	
2028	To be determined	
2030	To be determined	

==== Women's team ====
Year	Round	Pos
1979 to 2024	Did not enter	
2026	To be determined	
2028	To be determined	
2030	To be determined	

==== Mixed team ====
Year	Round	Pos
1980 to 2017	Did not enter	
2019	Group stage	
2021	Did not enter	
2023	Did not enter	
2025	To be determined	
2027	To be determined	
2029	To be determined	

**Red border color indicates tournament was held on home soil.

== Junior competitive record ==
=== Suhandinata Cup ===
Year	Round	Pos
2000 to 2023	Did not enter	
2024	To be determined	

=== African Youth Games ===
==== Men's team ====
Year	Round	Pos
2018	Group stage	6th

==== Women's team ====
Year	Round	Pos
2018	Group stage	5th

==== Mixed team ====
Year	Round	Pos
2014	Did not enter	

=== African Junior Team Championships ===
==== Mixed team ====
Year	Round	Pos
1979 to 2016	Did not enter	
2021	Group stage	6th
2022	Did not enter	
2024	To be determined	

**Red border color indicates tournament was held on home soil.

== Staff ==
The following list shows the coaching staff for the Benin national badminton team.

Name	Role
(Benin) Deyo Narcisse Simon	Head coach

== Players ==
=== Current squad ===
As of 2 January 2024

==== Men's team ====
Name	DoB/Age	Ranking of event		
Name	DoB/Age	MS	MD	XD
Oswald Ash Fano-Dosh	16 September 2003 (age 22)	796	534	626
Tobiloba Oyewole	15 March 1996 (age 29)	1339	534	–
Carlos Charles Ahouangassi	17 July 2002 (age 23)	1134	717	973
Julien Wadoud Totin	4 April 2004 (age 21)	862	717	740
Preferet Adomahou	8 April 2004 (age 21)	1134	1110	740
Carlos Miguel Codjo Kpanou	14 April 2003 (age 22)	1134	1110	703

==== Women's team ====
Name	DoB/Age	Ranking of event		
Name	DoB/Age	WS	WD	XD
Anna Akakpo	10 June 2006 (age 19)	889	558	973
Pernelle Fabossou	11 February 2003 (age 22)	701	558	626
Michelle Kpanou	16 July 2000 (age 25)	701	589	1160
Olougbemiga Atchade	9 October 2003 (age 21)	889	589	740
Hilary Fabossou	20 October 2005 (age 19)	889	871	703
Flora Kpogbemabou	11 October 2004 (age 20)	889	871	740
