= African Junior Badminton Championships =

Badminton championships

- Current season, competition or edition: 2026 African Junior Badminton Championships
- Sport: Badminton
- Founded: 1993; 33 years ago
- Most recent champion: Algeria
- Website: badmintonafrica.com

The African Junior Badminton Championships is a tournament organized by the Badminton Confederation of Africa, the governing body of badminton in Africa to crown the best junior badminton players (under-19) in the continent.

The championships were established in 1993 and the first edition was held in Ndola, Zambia.

== Championships (U–19) ==
=== Location of the African Junior Badminton Championships (U–19) ===
The table below gives an overview of all host cities and countries of the African Junior Badminton Championships. The most recent games were held in Beau Bassin-Rose Hill in 2022. The number in parentheses following the city/country denotes how many times that city/country has hosted the championships.

Year	Number	Host city	Events
1993	1	Ndola, Zambia (1)	6
1995	2	Durban, South Africa (1)	6
1997	3	Gaborone, Botswana (1)	6
1999	4	Johannesburg, South Africa (1)	6
2001	5	Lusaka, Zambia (1)	6
2003	6	Cairo, Egypt (1)	6
2005	7	Addis Ababa, Ethiopia (1)	6
2007	8	Gaborone, Botswana (2)	6

Year	Number	Host city	Events
2009	9	Addis Ababa, Ethiopia (2)	6
2011	10	Rose Hill, Mauritius (1)	6
2013	11	Algiers, Algeria (1)	6
2016	12	Casablanca, Morocco (1)	6
2021	13	Cotonou, Benin (1)	6
2022	14	Rose Hill, Mauritius (2)	6
2024	15	Thiès, Senegal (1)	6
2026	16	Cairo, Egypt (2)	6

=== Medal table (2007–2026) ===
African Junior Badminton Championships (U–19)
Rank	NOC	Gold	Silver	Bronze	Total
1	South Africa (RSA)	22	15	12	49
2	Mauritius (MRI)	12	7	28	47
3	Egypt (EGY)	8	14	27	49
4	Algeria (ALG)	6	7	9	22
5	Uganda (UGA)	3	2	7	12
6	Nigeria (NGR)	2	4	3	9
7	Seychelles (SEY)	1	0	3	4
8	Ghana (GHA)	0	2	6	8
9	Botswana (BOT)	0	0	2	2
9	Réunion (REU)	0	0	2	2
11	Benin (BEN)	0	0	1	1
11	Cameroon (CMR)	0	0	1	1
11	Ethiopia (ETH)	0	0	1	1
11	Ivory Coast (CIV)	0	0	1	1
11	Zambia (ZAM)	0	0	1	1
Totals (15 entries)		54	51	104	209

=== Previous winners ===
==== Individual competition ====
Year	Men's singles	Women's singles	Men's doubles	Women's doubles	Mixed doubles
1993	No data				
1995	(Nigeria) Segun Akinsanya	(South Africa) Charne du Preez	(Mauritius) Patrice Anodin (Mauritius) Li Ying	(South Africa) Anneska Davel (South Africa) Charne du Preez	(South Africa) Dean Potgieter (South Africa) Claire Anderson
1997	No data				
1999	No data				
2001	No data				
2003	No data				
2005	(Nigeria) Jinkan Ifraimu	(South Africa) Stacey Doubell	(Nigeria) Jinkan Ifraimu (Nigeria) Hussaini Musa	(South Africa) Annari Viljoen (South Africa) Jade Morgan	(South Africa) Duncan Anderton (South Africa) Stacey Doubell
2007	(South Africa) Jacob Maliekal	(South Africa) Shareen Matthews	(Egypt) Mahmoud El-Sayad (Egypt) Ali Ahmed El-Khateeb	(South Africa) Candace Mann (South Africa) Jennifer Fry	(South Africa) Reinard Louw (South Africa) Jennifer Fry
2009	(South Africa) Jacob Maliekal	(Seychelles) Allisen Camille	(South Africa) Jacob Maliekal (South Africa) Jason Coetzer	(Mauritius) Kate Foo Kune (Mauritius) Yeldy Louison	(South Africa) Jacob Maliekal (South Africa) Debbie Godfrey
2011	(Egypt) Mahmoud El Sayad	(Mauritius) Kate Foo Kune	(South Africa) Andries Malan (South Africa) Prakash Nath	(South Africa) Elme de Villiers (South Africa) Lee-Ann de Wet	(South Africa) Andries Malan (South Africa) Jennifer van der Berg
2013	(Nigeria) Habeeb Bello	(Nigeria) Dorcas Ajoke Adesokan	(Mauritius) Aatish Lubah (Mauritius) Julien Paul	(South Africa) Anri Schoonees (South Africa) Lee-Ann de Wet	(Mauritius) Julien Paul (Mauritius) Aurélie Allet
2016	(Egypt) Adham Hatem Elgamal	(Algeria) Halla Bouksani	(Algeria) Yacine Belhouane (Algeria) Samy Khaldi	(South Africa) Johanita Scholtz (South Africa) Zani van der Merwe	(Algeria) Yacine Belhouane (Algeria) Sirine Ibrahim
2021	(South Africa) Caden Kakora	(Egypt) Nour Ahmed Youssri	(South Africa) Caden Kakora (South Africa) Robert White	(South Africa) Amy Ackerman (South Africa) Diane Olivier	(South Africa) Robert White (South Africa) Amy Ackerman
2022	(Mauritius) Khemtish Rai Nundah	(Uganda) Fadilah Mohamed Rafi	(Egypt) Mohamed Hegazy (Egypt) Youssif Mohamed	(Uganda) Fadilah Mohamed Rafi (Uganda) Tracy Naluwooza	(Uganda) Abed Bukenya (Uganda) Fadilah Mohamed Rafi
2024	(Mauritius) Lucas Douce	(Egypt) Reem Hussein	(Mauritius) Lucas Douce (Mauritius) Aidan Yu Kiat	(Mauritius) Chiara How Hong (Mauritius) Elsa How Hong	(Mauritius) Lucas Douce (Mauritius) Elsa How Hong
2026	(Algeria) Ayoub Rayan Daoud	(Egypt) Fatema Rabie	(Algeria) Ayoub Rayan Daoud (Algeria) Oussama Keddou	(Mauritius) Chiara How Hong (Mauritius) Elsa How Hong	(Algeria) Oussama Keddou (Algeria) Chiraz Halimi

==== Team competition ====
===== Mixed team =====
Year	Winners
1993	South Africa
1995	South Africa
1997	Mauritius
1999	Nigeria
2001	South Africa
2003	Egypt
2005	Nigeria
2007	South Africa
2009	South Africa
2011	South Africa
2013	South Africa
2016	Egypt
2021	South Africa
2022	Mauritius
2024	Mauritius
2026	South Africa

== See also ==
- African Badminton Championships
- All Africa Men's and Women's Team Badminton Championships
