= Francis Orbih =

Nigerian badminton administrator

President of the Badminton Federation of Nigeria
- Incumbent
- Assumed office June 13 2017

Personal details
- Born: Francis Orbih

Francis Orbih is a Nigerian administrator and President of the Badminton Federation of Nigeria (BFN) since June 13th 2017. Before becoming the president of the Badminton federation; he was the chairman of Lagos State Badminton Association of Nigeria (LSBA).

He is a council member of the Badminton Confederation Africa (BCA).
