= 2009 African Junior Badminton Championships =

Tournament details
- Dates: 2–5 August (Team event); 7–9 August (Individual event)
- Edition: 9th
- Venue: Arat Kilo Hall
- Location: Addis Ababa, Ethiopia

The 2009 African Junior Badminton Championships were the continental badminton championships to crown the best youth players and teams across Africa. The tournament was held at the Arat Kilo Hall in Addis Ababa, Ethiopia, from 2 to 9 August 2009.

== Tournament ==
The 2009 African Junior Badminton Championships were held in two separate events. The mixed team event, officially All Africa U-19 Mixed Team Championships 2009, was a continental tournament to crown the best team in Africa. A total of 9 countries across Africa registered their players to compete at mixed team event.

The individual event, officially All Africa U-19 Individual Championships 2009, was a continental tournament to crown the best players in Africa holding from 15 to 17 December.

=== Venue ===
This tournament was held at the Arat Kilo Hall in Addis Ababa with three courts.

== Medalists ==
Event	Gold	Silver	Bronze
Teams	South Africa	Mauritius	Ghana
Teams	South Africa	Mauritius	Ethiopia
Boys' singles	(South Africa) Jacob Maliekal	(South Africa) Edwin Johnson	(Ghana) Daniel Aryee
Boys' singles	(South Africa) Jacob Maliekal	(South Africa) Edwin Johnson	(South Africa) Jason Coetzer
Girls' singles	(Seychelles) Alisen Camille	(Mauritius) Kate Foo Kune	(South Africa) Debbie Godfrey
Girls' singles	(Seychelles) Alisen Camille	(Mauritius) Kate Foo Kune	(Mauritius) Yeldy Louison
Boys' doubles	(South Africa) Jacob Maliekal (South Africa) Jason Coetzer	(Ghana) Daniel Sam (Ghana) Daniel Aryee	(South Africa) Jamie MacManus (South Africa) Justin Mortimer
Boys' doubles	(South Africa) Jacob Maliekal (South Africa) Jason Coetzer	(Ghana) Daniel Sam (Ghana) Daniel Aryee	(Uganda) Herbert Ubayo (Uganda) Ian Senoga
Girls' doubles	(Mauritius) Kate Foo Kune (Mauritius) Yeldy Louison	(South Africa) Sandra le Grange (South Africa) Jennifer van der Berg	(Botswana) Boitumelo Mpipi (Botswana) Lgeso Kgosidiile
Girls' doubles	(Mauritius) Kate Foo Kune (Mauritius) Yeldy Louison	(South Africa) Sandra le Grange (South Africa) Jennifer van der Berg	(Uganda) Bridget Shamim Bangi (Uganda) Daisy Nakalyengo
Mixed doubles	(South Africa) Jacob Maliekal (South Africa) Debbie Godfrey	(South Africa) Jason Coetzer (South Africa) Jennifer van der Berg	(Botswana) Tlholego Chamo (Botswana) Lgeso Kgosidiile
Mixed doubles	(South Africa) Jacob Maliekal (South Africa) Debbie Godfrey	(South Africa) Jason Coetzer (South Africa) Jennifer van der Berg	(Mauritius) Christopher Paul (Mauritius) Yeldy Louison

=== Medal table ===
* Host nation (Ethiopia)

Rank	Nation	Gold	Silver	Bronze	Total
1	South Africa	4	3	3	10
2	Mauritius	1	2	2	5
3	Seychelles	1	0	0	1
4	Ghana	0	1	2	3
5	Botswana	0	0	2	2
5	Uganda	0	0	2	2
7	Ethiopia*	0	0	1	1
Totals (7 entries)		6	6	12	24

== Team event ==
=== Group A ===
Pos	Team	Pld	Pts
1	Mauritius	3	3
2	Ethiopia (H)	3	2
3	Algeria	3	1
4	Sudan	3	0

Source: New Vision
(H) Host

Mauritius	4–1	Algeria
Mauritius	5–0	Ethiopia
Mauritius	5–0	Sudan
Algeria	2–3	Ethiopia
Algeria	5–0	Sudan
Ethiopia	5–0	Sudan

=== Group B ===
Pos	Team	Pld	Pts
1	South Africa	4	4
2	Ghana	4	3
3	Uganda	4	2
4	Botswana	4	1
5	Kenya	4	0

Source: New Vision

South Africa	5–0	Ghana
South Africa	5–0	Uganda
South Africa	5–0	Botswana
South Africa	5–0	Kenya
Ghana	4–1	Uganda
Ghana	4–1	Botswana
Ghana	5–0	Kenya
Uganda	3–2	Botswana
Uganda	5–0	Kenya
Botswana	4–1	Kenya

=== Knockout stage ===
Semi-finals
Mauritius	3
Ghana	0
Ethiopia	0
South Africa	3

Final
Mauritius	2
South Africa	3

==== Final ====
South Africa
3
Arat Kilo Hall, Court 1
5 August 2009, 13:00 UTC+3

Mauritius
2

			1	2	3
1	(South Africa) (Mauritius)	Debbie Godfrey; Kate Foo Kune	19; 21	18; 21
2	(South Africa) (Mauritius)	Jacob Maliekal; Jérôme Joson	21; 14	21; 16
3	(South Africa) (Mauritius)	Sandra le Grange / Jennifer van der Berg; Kate Foo Kune / Yeldy Louison	19; 21	21; 17	21; 23
4	(South Africa) (Mauritius)	Jamie MacManus / Justin Mortimer; Jérôme Joson / Christopher Paul	21; 16	21; 17
5	(South Africa) (Mauritius)	Jacob Maliekal / Debbie Godfrey; Christopher Paul / Yeldy Louison	21; 9	21; 18

=== Final ranking ===
Pos	Team	Pld	W	L	Pts	MD	Final result
1st place, gold medalist(s)	South Africa	6	6	0	6	+24	Champions
2nd place, silver medalist(s)	Mauritius	5	4	1	4	+15	Runners-up
3rd place, bronze medalist(s)	Ghana	5	3	2	3	+8	Eliminated in semi-finals
3rd place, bronze medalist(s)	Ethiopia	4	2	2	2	−2	Eliminated in semi-finals
5	Uganda	4	2	2	2	+1	Eliminated in group stage
6	Algeria	3	1	2	1	+1	Eliminated in group stage
7	Botswana	4	1	3	1	−6	Eliminated in group stage
6	Sudan	3	0	3	0	−15	Eliminated in group stage
7	Kenya	4	0	4	0	−18	Eliminated in group stage
