= 2011 African Junior Badminton Championships =

Tournament details
- Dates: 21–23 August (Team event); 25–26 August (Individual event)
- Edition: 10th
- Venue: National Badminton Centre
- Location: Beau Bassin-Rose Hill, Mauritius

The 2011 African Junior Badminton Championships were the continental badminton championships to crown the best youth players and teams across Africa. The tournament was originally scheduled to be held from 27 to 30 July in Maputo, Mozambique and acted as a prelude to the 2011 All-Africa Games.

The tournament was later postponed to start on 21 August when Mozambique announced that the country pulled out of hosting the event due to financial issues. Mauritius was later chosen as the new host of the championships. The number of participating countries also suffered a significant drop, from 12 to 6 due to the postponement of the championships.

== Tournament ==
The 2011 African Junior Badminton Championships were held in two separate events. The mixed team event, officially All Africa U-19 Mixed Team Championships 2011, was a continental tournament to crown the best team in Africa. A total of 4 countries across Africa registered their players to compete at mixed team event.

The individual event, officially All Africa U-19 Individual Championships 2011, was a continental tournament to crown the best players in Africa holding from 25 to 26 August.

=== Venue ===
This tournament was held at the National Badminton Centre in Rose Hill with three courts.

== Medalists ==
Event	Gold	Silver	Bronze
Teams	South Africa; Cameron Coetzer; Andries Malan; Reneshan Naidoo; Prakash Nath; Elme de Villiers; Lee-Ann de Wet; Sandra le Grange; Jennifer van der Berg	Mauritius; Guillaume Lo; Aatish Lubah; Oshand Nobin; Julien Paul; Stephane Perne; Sejilen Rungassamy; Aurélie Allet; Nawsheen Domah; Rheea Dookhee; Kate Foo Kune; Deepti Ramchurn; Raeesah Rassoolkhan	Egypt; Youssef Ashraf; Mahmoud El Sayad; Omar Emad; Moataz Hesham; Nadine Ashraf; Rana Osman; Toka Elwasary; Aya Tayssir
Boys' singles	(Egypt) Mahmoud El Sayad	(South Africa) Andries Malan	(South Africa) Prakash Nath
Boys' singles	(Egypt) Mahmoud El Sayad	(South Africa) Andries Malan	(Mauritius) Aatish Lubah
Girls' singles	(Mauritius) Kate Foo Kune	(South Africa) Elme de Villiers	(Algeria) Nesrine Baya
Girls' singles	(Mauritius) Kate Foo Kune	(South Africa) Elme de Villiers	(Egypt) Nadine Ashraf
Boys' doubles	(South Africa) Andries Malan (South Africa) Prakash Nath	(South Africa) Cameron Coetzer (South Africa) Reneshan Naidoo	(Egypt) Youssef Ashraf (Egypt) Mahmoud El Sayad
Boys' doubles	(South Africa) Andries Malan (South Africa) Prakash Nath	(South Africa) Cameron Coetzer (South Africa) Reneshan Naidoo	(Egypt) Omar Emad (Egypt) Moataz Hesham
Girls' doubles	(South Africa) Elme de Villiers (South Africa) Lee-Ann de Wet	(South Africa) Sandra le Grange (South Africa) Jennifer van der Berg	(Egypt) Nadine Ashraf (Egypt) Aya Tayssir
Girls' doubles	(South Africa) Elme de Villiers (South Africa) Lee-Ann de Wet	(South Africa) Sandra le Grange (South Africa) Jennifer van der Berg	(Mauritius) Aurélie Allet (Mauritius) Kate Foo Kune
Mixed doubles	(South Africa) Andries Malan (South Africa) Jennifer van der Berg	(Egypt) Mahmoud El Sayad (Egypt) Nadine Ashraf	(South Africa) Prakash Nath (South Africa) Elme de Villiers
Mixed doubles	(South Africa) Andries Malan (South Africa) Jennifer van der Berg	(Egypt) Mahmoud El Sayad (Egypt) Nadine Ashraf	(Mauritius) Aatish Lubah (Mauritius) Kate Foo Kune

=== Medal table ===
* Host nation (Mauritius)

Rank	Nation	Gold	Silver	Bronze	Total
1	South Africa	4	4	2	10
2	Egypt	1	1	5	7
3	Mauritius*	1	1	3	5
4	Algeria	0	0	1	1
Totals (4 entries)		6	6	11	23

== Team event ==
=== Knockout stage ===
Semi-finals
South Africa	3
Egypt	1
Algeria	0
Mauritius	3

Final
South Africa	3
Mauritius	1
Third place
Egypt	4
Algeria	0

=== Final ranking ===
Pos	Team	Pld	W	L	Pts	MD	Final result
1st place, gold medalist(s)	South Africa	3	3	0	3	+9	Champions
2nd place, silver medalist(s)	Mauritius	3	2	1	2	+2	Runners-up
3rd place, bronze medalist(s)	Egypt	3	1	2	1	+1	Third place
4	Algeria	3	0	3	0	−12	Fourth place

== Individual event ==
=== Boys' singles ===
Semifinals
1	(Egypt) Mahmoud El Sayad	21	23	21
4	(South Africa) Prakash Nath	14	25	18
(Mauritius) Aatish Lubah	18	13
2	(South Africa) Andries Malan	21	21

Final
1	(Egypt) Mahmoud El Sayad	21	17	21
2	(South Africa) Andries Malan	17	21	7

=== Girls' singles ===
Semifinals
1	(Mauritius) Kate Foo Kune	21	21
4	(Algeria) Nesrine Baya	16	9
3	(Egypt) Nadine Ashraf	13	19
2	(South Africa) Elme de Villiers	21	21

Final
(Mauritius) Kate Foo Kune	21	21
(South Africa) Elme de Villiers	17	19

=== Boys' doubles ===
Semifinals
1	(South Africa) Andries Malan (South Africa) Prakash Nath	21	21
(Egypt) Omar Emad (Egypt) Moataz Hesham	17	18
3	(Egypt) Youssef Ashraf (Egypt) Mahmoud El Sayad	19	13
(South Africa) Cameron Coetzer (South Africa) Reneshan Naidoo	21	21

Final
1	(South Africa) Andries Malan (South Africa) Prakash Nath	23	17	21
(South Africa) Cameron Coetzer (South Africa) Reneshan Naidoo	21	21	16

=== Girls' doubles ===
Semifinals
1	(Egypt) Nadine Ashraf (Egypt) Aya Tayssir	13	18
4	(South Africa) Elme de Villiers (South Africa) Lee-Ann de Wet	21	21
3	(Mauritius) Aurélie Allet (Mauritius) Kate Foo Kune	11	23	17
2	(South Africa) Sandra le Grange (South Africa) Jennifer van der Berg	21	21	21

Final
4	(South Africa) Elme de Villiers (South Africa) Lee-Ann de Wet	21	21
2	(South Africa) Sandra le Grange (South Africa) Jennifer van der Berg	12	18

=== Mixed doubles ===
Semifinals
1	(Egypt) Mahmoud El Sayad (Egypt) Nadine Ashraf	21	21
(South Africa) Prakash Nath (South Africa) Elme de Villiers	11	14
4	(Mauritius) Aatish Lubah (Mauritius) Kate Foo Kune	21	11	16
2	(South Africa) Andries Malan (South Africa) Jennifer van der Berg	13	21	21

Final
1	(Egypt) Mahmoud El Sayad (Egypt) Nadine Ashraf	15	20
2	(South Africa) Andries Malan (South Africa) Jennifer van der Berg	21	22
