= 2022 All Africa Men's and Women's Team Badminton Championships =

Tournament details
- Dates: 14–17 February
- Edition: 9th
- Venue: Lugogo Arena
- Location: Kampala, Uganda

The 2022 All Africa Men's and Women's Team Badminton Championships was a continental stage tournament of Thomas and Uber Cups, and also to crown the best men's and women's badminton team in Africa. This tournament was held in Kampala, Uganda between 14 and 17 February 2022.

== Medalists ==
Event	Gold	Silver	Bronze
Men's team	Algeria; Mohamed Abderrahime Belarbi; Adel Hamek; Sifeddine Larbaoui; Koceila Mammeri; Youcef Sabri Medel; Mohamed Abdelaziz Ouchefoun	Egypt; Abdelrahman Abdelhakim; Kareem Mahmoud Ahmed; Adham Hatem Elgamal; Mohamed Mostafa Kamel; Ahmed Salah	South Africa; Cameron Coetzer; Jarred Elliott; Caden Kakora; Ruan Snyman; Robert Summers; Robert White
Men's team	Algeria; Mohamed Abderrahime Belarbi; Adel Hamek; Sifeddine Larbaoui; Koceila Mammeri; Youcef Sabri Medel; Mohamed Abdelaziz Ouchefoun	Egypt; Abdelrahman Abdelhakim; Kareem Mahmoud Ahmed; Adham Hatem Elgamal; Mohamed Mostafa Kamel; Ahmed Salah	Mauritius; Melvin Appiah; Jean Bernard Bongout; Aatish Lubah; Khemtish Nundah; Tejraj Pultoo; Saheer Ramrakha
Women's team	Egypt; Nour Ahmed Youssri; Jana Ashraf; Doha Hany; Jana Abdelkader; Hana Tarek	Uganda; Brenda Awor; Husina Kobugabe; Fadilah Mohamed Rafi; Tracy Naluwooza; Rajab Shamsa Mbira; Sharifah Wanyana	Mauritius; Vilina Appiah; Tiya Bhurtun; Lorna Bodha; Kobita Dookhee
Women's team	Egypt; Nour Ahmed Youssri; Jana Ashraf; Doha Hany; Jana Abdelkader; Hana Tarek	Uganda; Brenda Awor; Husina Kobugabe; Fadilah Mohamed Rafi; Tracy Naluwooza; Rajab Shamsa Mbira; Sharifah Wanyana	South Africa; Amy Ackerman; Demi Botha; Deidre Laurens Jordaan; Diane Olivier

=== Medal table ===
* Host nation (Uganda)

Rank	Nation	Gold	Silver	Bronze	Total
1	Egypt	1	1	0	2
2	Algeria	1	0	0	1
3	Uganda*	0	1	0	1
4	Mauritius	0	0	2	2
4	South Africa	0	0	2	2
Totals (5 entries)		2	2	4	8

== Tournament ==
The All Africa Men's and Women's Team Badminton Championships officially crowns the best male and female national badminton teams in Africa and at the same time works as the African qualification event towards the 2022 Thomas & Uber Cup finals. 17 teams consisting of 10 men's team and 7 women's team have entered the tournament.

=== Venue ===
Venue of this tournament is Lugogo Arena, in Kampala, Uganda.

== Men's team ==
All times are Uganda Standard Time (UTC+03:00).

=== Group stage ===
==== Group A ====
Pos	Team	Pld	W	L	MF	MA	MD	GF	GA	GD	PF	PA	PD	Pts	Qualification
1	Mauritius	2	2	0	10	0	+10	20	1	+19	427	142	+285	2	Knockout stage
2	Zambia	2	1	1	5	5	0	11	10	+1	352	348	+4	1	Knockout stage
3	Zimbabwe	2	0	2	0	10	−10	0	20	−20	131	420	−289	0	

Source: TS
- Mauritius vs Zimbabwe

Mauritius
5
Lugogo Arena, Court 1
14 February 2022 14:30

Zimbabwe
0

			1	2	3
1	(Mauritius) (Zimbabwe)	Melvin Appiah; Thabani Mathe	21; 0	21; 0
2	(Mauritius) (Zimbabwe)	Jean Bernard Bongout; Dean Matyanga	21; 0	21; 0
3	(Mauritius) (Zimbabwe)	Khemtish Nundah; Prince Mateme	21; 0	21; 0
4	(Mauritius) (Zimbabwe)	Jean Bernard Bongout / Tejraj Pultoo; Ashel Dziva / Tanaka Muvavi	21; 0	21; 0
5	(Mauritius) (Zimbabwe)	Aatish Lubah / Saheer Ramrakha; Thabani Mathe / Dean Matyanga	21; 0	21; 0

- Zambia vs Zimbabwe

Zambia
5
Lugogo Arena, Court 1
15 February 2022 9:00

Zimbabwe
0

			1	2	3
1	(Zambia) (Zimbabwe)	Kalombo Mulenga; Thabani Mathe	21; 13	21; 13
2	(Zambia) (Zimbabwe)	Mwanza Edward; Dean Matyanga	21; 6	21; 6
3	(Zambia) (Zimbabwe)	Rodrick Mwansa; Tanaka Muvavi	21; 9	21; 16
4	(Zambia) (Zimbabwe)	Mwanza Edward / Kalombo Mulenga; Thabani Mathe / Dean Matyanga	21; 19	21; 17
5	(Zambia) (Zimbabwe)	Marvin Chisela / Rodrick Mwansa; Prince Mateme / Tanaka Muvavi	21; 14	21; 18

- Mauritius vs Zambia

Mauritius
5
Lugogo Arena, Court 2
15 February 2022 18:00

Zambia
0

			1	2	3
1	(Mauritius) (Zambia)	Aatish Lubah; Kalombo Mulenga	21; 15	21; 19
2	(Mauritius) (Zambia)	Melvin Appiah; Mwanza Edward	21; 17	21; 19
3	(Mauritius) (Zambia)	Jean Bernard Bongout; Rodrick Mwansa	21; 15	17; 21	11; 2	retired
4	(Mauritius) (Zambia)	Jean Bernard Bongout / Tejraj Pultoo; Mwanza Edward / Kalombo Mulenga	21; 15	21; 19
5	(Mauritius) (Zambia)	Melvin Appiah / Aatish Lubah; Marvin Chisela / Rodrick Mwansa	21; 0	21; 0

==== Group B ====
Pos	Team	Pld	W	L	MF	MA	MD	GF	GA	GD	PF	PA	PD	Pts	Qualification
1	Algeria	3	3	0	14	1	+13	29	3	+26	659	453	+206	3	Knockout stage
2	Réunion	3	2	1	7	8	−1	16	19	−3	624	655	−31	2	Knockout stage
3	Uganda (H)	3	1	2	8	7	+1	17	16	+1	607	569	+38	1	
4	Benin	3	0	3	1	14	−13	5	29	−24	490	703	−213	0	

Source: TS
(H) Host
- Algeria vs Réunion

Algeria
5
Lugogo Arena, Court 3
14 February 2022 10:00

Réunion
0

			1	2	3
1	(Algeria) (Réunion)	Youcef Sabri Medel; Assing Aaron	21; 10	21; 17
2	(Algeria) (Réunion)	Mohamed Abderrahime Belarbi; Chan Fung Ting Xavier	18; 21	21; 15	21; 19
3	(Algeria) (Réunion)	Adel Hamek; Gregory Grondin	21; 14	21; 13
4	(Algeria) (Réunion)	Koceila Mammeri / Youcef Sabri Medel; Assing Aaron / Chan Fung Ting Xavier	21; 12	21; 17
5	(Algeria) (Réunion)	Mohamed Abderrahime Belarbi / Adel Hamek; Gregory Grondin / Nanicaoudin Loic Antoine	21; 12	21; 15

- Uganda vs Benin

Uganda
5
Lugogo Arena, Court 1
14 February 2022 10:00

Benin
0

			1	2	3
1	(Uganda) (Benin)	Brian Kasirye; Carlos Charles Ahouangassi	21; 4	21; 6
2	(Uganda) (Benin)	Israel Wanagalya; Oswald Ash Fano-Dosh	21; 18	21; 14
3	(Uganda) (Benin)	Friday Attama; Preferet Adomahou	21; 16	21; 8
4	(Uganda) (Benin)	Brian Kasirye / Israel Wanagalya; Carlos Charles Ahouangassi / Carlos Miguel Codjo Kpanou	21; 17	21; 13
5	(Uganda) (Benin)	Friday Attama / Amos Muyanja; Preferet Adomahou / Oswald Ash Fano-Dosh	21; 7	19; 21	21; 19

- Algeria vs Benin

Algeria
5
Lugogo Arena, Court 3
14 February 2022 18:30

Benin
0

			1	2	3
1	(Algeria) (Benin)	Youcef Sabri Medel; Carlos Miguel Codjo Kpanou	21; 10	21; 14
2	(Algeria) (Benin)	Adel Hamek; Carlos Charles Ahouangassi	21; 9	21; 12
3	(Algeria) (Benin)	Sifeddine Larbaoui; Oswald Ash Fano-Dosh	21; 13	21; 14
4	(Algeria) (Benin)	Mohamed Abderrahime Belarbi / Mohamed Abdelaziz Ouchefoun; Preferet Adomahou / Carlos Miguel Codjo Kpanou	21; 13	21; 8
5	(Algeria) (Benin)	Koceila Mammeri / Youcef Sabri Medel; Carlos Charles Ahouangassi / Oswald Ash Fano-Dosh	21; 16	21; 14

- Uganda vs Réunion

Uganda
2
Lugogo Arena, Court 2
14 February 2022 18:30

Réunion
3

			1	2	3
1	(Uganda) (Réunion)	Brian Kasirye; Assing Aaron	21; 15	21; 10
2	(Uganda) (Réunion)	Israel Wanagalya; Nanicaoudin Loic Antoine	21; 18	21; 19
3	(Uganda) (Réunion)	Friday Attaman; Chan Fung Ting Xavier	19; 21	19; 21
4	(Uganda) (Réunion)	Paul Makande / Kenneth Comfort Mwambu; Gregory Grondin / Nanicaoudin Loic Antoine	14; 21	17; 21
5	(Uganda) (Réunion)	Brian Kasirye / Israel Wanagalya; Assing Aaron / Chan Fung Ting Xavier	21; 17	11; 21	18; 21

- Algeria vs Uganda

Algeria
4
Lugogo Arena, Court 1
15 February 2022 14:00

Uganda
1

			1	2	3
1	(Algeria) (Uganda)	Youcef Sabri Medel; Brian Kasirye	17; 21	21; 17	12; 21
2	(Algeria) (Uganda)	Mohamed Abderrahime Belarbi; Israel Wanagalya	24; 22	21; 8
3	(Algeria) (Uganda)	Adel Hamek; Friday Attaman	21; 13	21; 19
4	(Algeria) (Uganda)	Koceila Mammeri / Youcef Sabri Medel; Brian Kasirye / Israel Wanagalya	21; 12	21; 14
5	(Algeria) (Uganda)	Mohamed Abderrahime Belarbi / Adel Hamek; Friday Attaman / Paul Makande	21; 13	21; 15

- Benin vs Réunion

Benin
1
Lugogo Arena, Court 3
15 February 2022 14:00

Réunion
4

			1	2	3
1	(Benin) (Réunion)	Oswald Ash Fano-Dosh; Assing Aaron	22; 24	21; 18	21; 14
2	(Benin) (Réunion)	Preferet Adomahou; Nanicaoudin Loic Antoine	12; 21	22; 20	13; 21
3	(Benin) (Réunion)	Carlos Charles Ahouangassi; Chan Fung Ting Xavier	21; 16	16; 21	12; 21
4	(Benin) (Réunion)	Carlos Charles Ahouangassi / Oswald Ash Fano-Dosh; Assing Aaron / Chan Fung Ting Xavier	14; 21	11; 21
5	(Benin) (Réunion)	Preferet Adomahou / Carlos Miguel Codjo Kpanou; Gregory Grondin / Nanicaoudin Loic Antoine	23; 25	16; 21

==== Group C ====
Pos	Team	Pld	W	L	MF	MA	MD	GF	GA	GD	PF	PA	PD	Pts	Qualification
1	Egypt	2	2	0	9	1	+8	18	2	+16	407	252	+155	2	Knockout stage
2	South Africa	2	1	1	6	4	+2	12	8	+4	370	275	+95	1	Knockout stage
3	Cameroon	2	0	2	0	10	−10	0	20	−20	170	420	−250	0	

Source: TS
- Egypt vs Cameroon

Egypt
5
Lugogo Arena, Court 2
14 February 2022 14:30

Cameroon
0

			1	2	3
1	(Egypt) (Cameroon)	Ahmed Salah; Félix Michel Kemene Atangana	21; 5	21; 9
2	(Egypt) (Cameroon)	Mohamed Mostafa Kamel; Michel Henri Assembe	21; 8	21; 17
3	(Egypt) (Cameroon)	Abdelrahman Abdelhakim; Gilles Francis Donguitsop	21; 8	21; 10
4	(Egypt) (Cameroon)	Abdelrahman Abdelhakim / Mohamed Mostafa Kamel; Michel Henri Assembe / Antoine Eddy Owona Ndimako	21; 6	21; 8
5	(Egypt) (Cameroon)	Kareem Mahmoud Ahmed / Adham Hatem Elgamal; Gilles Francis Donguitsop / Félix Michel Kemene Atangana	21; 6	21; 15

- South Africa vs Cameroon

South Africa
5
Lugogo Arena, Court 2
15 February 2022 9:00

Cameroon
0

			1	2	3
1	(South Africa) (Cameroon)	Ruan Snyman; Félix Michel Kemene Atangana	21; 13	21; 11
2	(South Africa) (Cameroon)	Robert Summers; Michel Henri Assembe	21; 3	21; 8
3	(South Africa) (Cameroon)	Caden Kakora; Antoine Eddy Owona Ndimako	21; 8	21; 6
4	(South Africa) (Cameroon)	Jarred Elliott / Robert Summers; Gilles Francis Donguitsop / Félix Michel Kemene Atangana	21; 5	21; 12
5	(South Africa) (Cameroon)	Cameron Coetzer / Robert White; Michel Henri Assembe / Antoine Eddy Owona Ndimako	21; 8	21; 4

- Egypt vs South Africa

Egypt
4
Lugogo Arena, Court 1
15 February 2022 18:00

South Africa
1

			1	2	3
1	(Egypt) (South Africa)	Adham Hatem Elgamal; Ruan Snyman	21; 10	22; 20
2	(Egypt) (South Africa)	Ahmed Salah; Robert Summers	21; 10	21; 15
3	(Egypt) (South Africa)	Abdelrahman Abdelhakim; Robert White	11; 21	17; 21
4	(Egypt) (South Africa)	Adham Hatem Elgamal / Ahmed Salah; Jarred Elliott / Robert Summers	21; 13	21; 16
5	(Egypt) (South Africa)	Abdelrahman Abdelhakim / Mohamed Mostafa Kamel; Cameron Coetzer / Robert White	21; 16	21; 18

=== Knockout stage ===
==== Bracket ====
The draw was conducted on 15 February 2022 after the last match of the group stage.

Quarter-finals
Egypt
Bye
16 February 14:00
South Africa	3
Zambia	1
16 February 14:00
Réunion	2
Mauritius	3
Algeria
Bye

Semi-finals
17 February 9:00
Egypt	3
South Africa	1
17 February 9:00
Mauritius	0
Algeria	3

Final
17 February 16:30
Egypt	0
Algeria	3

==== Quarter-finals ====
===== South Africa vs Zambia =====
South Africa
3
Lugogo Arena Court 1
16 February 2022 14:00 UTC+3

Zambia
1

			1	2	3
1	(South Africa) (Zambia)	Ruan Snyman; Kalombo Mulenga	19; 21	15; 21
2	(South Africa) (Zambia)	Robert White; Mwanza Edward	21; 14	21; 11
3	(South Africa) (Zambia)	Cameron Coetzer; Marvin Chisela	21; 7	21; 15
4	(South Africa) (Zambia)	Jarred Elliott / Robert Summers; Mwanza Edward / Kalombo Mulenga	21; 16	23; 25	21; 15
5	(South Africa) (Zambia)	Cameron Coetzer / Robert White; Marvin Chisela / Rodrick Mwansa				not played

===== Réunion vs Mauritius =====
Réunion
2
Lugogo Arena Court 2
16 February 2022 14:00 UTC+3

Mauritius
3

			1	2	3
1	(Réunion) (Mauritius)	Nanicaoudin Loic Antoine; Aatish Lubah	9; 21	21; 18	5; 21
2	(Réunion) (Mauritius)	Chan Fung Ting Xavier; Melvin Appiah	18; 21	27; 25	21; 18
3	(Réunion) (Mauritius)	Gregory Grondin; Jean Bernard Bongout	11; 21	12; 21
4	(Réunion) (Mauritius)	Assing Aaron / Chan Fung Ting Xavier; Jean Bernard Bongout / Tejraj Pultoo	17; 21	21; 16	21; 16
5	(Réunion) (Mauritius)	Gregory Grondin / Nanicaoudin Loic Antoine; Melvin Appiah / Aatish Lubah	13; 21	21; 19	4; 21

==== Semi-finals ====
===== Egypt vs South Africa =====
Egypt
3
Lugogo Arena Court 1
17 February 2022 09:00 UTC+3

South Africa
1

			1	2	3
1	(Egypt) (South Africa)	Adham Hatem Elgamal; Ruan Snyman	21; 12	23; 21
2	(Egypt) (South Africa)	Ahmed Salah; Robert White	16; 21	12; 21
3	(Egypt) (South Africa)	Mohamed Mostafa Kamel; Cameron Coetzer	25; 23	21; 13
4	(Egypt) (South Africa)	Adham Hatem Elgamal / Ahmed Salah; Jarred Elliott / Robert Summers	21; 18	21; 15
5	(Egypt) (South Africa)	Abdelrahman Abdelhakim / Mohamed Mostafa Kamel; Cameron Coetzer / Robert White				not played

===== Mauritius vs Algeria =====
Mauritius
0
Lugogo Arena Court 2
17 February 2022 09:00 UTC+3

Algeria
3

			1	2	3
1	(Mauritius) (Algeria)	Aatish Lubah; Mohamed Abderrahime Belarbi	18; 21	21; 11	20; 22
2	(Mauritius) (Algeria)	Melvin Appiah; Koceila Mammeri	20; 22	11; 21
3	(Mauritius) (Algeria)	Jean Bernard Bongout; Adel Hamek	21; 19	18; 21	13; 21
4	(Mauritius) (Algeria)	Jean Bernard Bongout / Tejraj Pultoo; Koceila Mammeri / Youcef Sabri Medel				not played
5	(Mauritius) (Algeria)	Melvin Appiah / Aatish Lubah; Mohamed Abderrahime Belarbi / Adel Hamek				not played

==== Final ====
===== Egypt vs Algeria =====
Egypt
0
Lugogo Arena Court 1
17 February 2022 16:30 UTC+3

Algeria
3

			1	2	3
1	(Egypt) (Algeria)	Adham Hatem Elgamal; Youcef Sabri Medel	21; 8	16; 21	18; 21
2	(Egypt) (Algeria)	Ahmed Salah; Mohamed Abderrahime Belarbi	18; 21	24; 22	18; 21
3	(Egypt) (Algeria)	Mohamed Mostafa Kamel; Adel Hamek	20; 22	13; 21
4	(Egypt) (Algeria)	Kareem Mahmoud Ahmed / Adham Hatem Elgamal; Koceila Mammeri / Youcef Sabri Medel				not played
5	(Egypt) (Algeria)	Abdelrahman Abdelhakim / Ahmed Salah; Mohamed Abderrahime Belarbi / Adel Hamek				not played

=== Final ranking ===
Pos	Team	Pld	W	L	Pts	MD	GD	PD	Final result
1st place, gold medalist(s)	Algeria	5	5	0	10	+19	+34	+231	Champions
2nd place, silver medalist(s)	Egypt	4	3	1	6	+7	+16	+162	Runners-up
3rd place, bronze medalist(s)	Mauritius	4	3	1	6	+8	+17	+328	Eliminated in semi-finals
3rd place, bronze medalist(s)	South Africa	4	2	2	4	+2	+3	+117	Eliminated in semi-finals
5	Réunion	4	2	2	4	−2	−5	−90	Eliminated in quarter-finals
6	Zambia	3	1	2	2	−2	−2	−34	Eliminated in quarter-finals
7	Uganda (H)	3	1	2	2	+1	+1	+38	Eliminated in group stage
8	Cameroon	2	0	2	0	−10	−20	−250	Eliminated in group stage
9	Zimbabwe	2	0	2	0	−10	−20	−289	Eliminated in group stage
10	Benin	3	0	3	0	−13	−24	−213	Eliminated in group stage

== Women's team ==
All times are Uganda Standard Time (UTC+03:00).

=== Group stage ===
==== Group A ====
Pos	Team	Pld	W	L	MF	MA	MD	GF	GA	GD	PF	PA	PD	Pts	Qualification
1	Mauritius	2	1	1	6	4	+2	12	11	+1	407	412	−5	1	Knockout stage
2	South Africa	2	1	1	5	5	0	14	10	+4	448	398	+50	1	Knockout stage
3	Réunion	2	1	1	4	6	−2	10	15	−5	410	455	−45	1	

Source: TS
- South Africa vs Réunion

South Africa
2
Lugogo Arena, Court 2
14 February 2022 10:00

Réunion
3

			1	2	3
1	(South Africa) (Réunion)	Deidre Laurens Jordaan; Leperlier Estelle	21; 15	21; 12
2	(South Africa) (Réunion)	Diane Olivier; Mathilde Lepetit	23; 21	12; 21	18; 21
3	(South Africa) (Réunion)	Demi Botha; Audrey Lebon	11; 21	21; 9	14; 21
4	(South Africa) (Réunion)	Amy Ackerman / Deidre Laurens Jordaan; Audrey Lebon / Leperlier Estelle	21; 13	21; 3
5	(South Africa) (Réunion)	Demi Botha / Diane Olivier; Ly-Hoa Chai / Mathilde Lepetit	21; 16	15; 21	12; 21

- Mauritius vs Réunion

Mauritius
4
Lugogo Arena, Court 3
15 February 2022 18:00

Réunion
1

			1	2	3
1	(Mauritius) (Réunion)	Kobita Dookhee; Leperlier Estelle	21; 12	21; 10
2	(Mauritius) (Réunion)	Lorna Bodha; Mathilde Lepetit	19; 21	21; 11	21; 12
3	(Mauritius) (Réunion)	Tiya Bhurtun; Audrey Lebon	21; 17	12; 21	24; 22
4	(Mauritius) (Réunion)	Lorna Bodha / Kobita Dookhee; Audrey Lebon / Leperlier Estelle	21; 16	21; 11
5	(Mauritius) (Réunion)	Vilina Appiah / Tiya Bhurtun; Ly-Hoa Chai / Mathilde Lepetit	15; 21	7; 21

- South Africa vs Mauritius

South Africa
3
Lugogo Arena, Court 1
16 February 2022 9:00

Mauritius
2

			1	2	3
1	(South Africa) (Mauritius)	Deidre Laurens Jordaan; Kobita Dookhee	14; 21	17; 21
2	(South Africa) (Mauritius)	Amy Ackerman; Lorna Bodha	21; 17	21; 9
3	(South Africa) (Mauritius)	Demi Botha; Tiya Bhurtun	21; 15	17; 21	22; 24
4	(South Africa) (Mauritius)	Amy Ackerman / Deidre Laurens Jordaan; Lorna Bodha / Kobita Dookhee	21; 15	21; 7
5	(South Africa) (Mauritius)	Demi Botha / Diane Olivier; Vilina Appiah / Tiya Bhurtun	21; 18	21; 15

==== Group B ====
Pos	Team	Pld	W	L	MF	MA	MD	GF	GA	GD	PF	PA	PD	Pts	Qualification
1	Uganda (H)	3	2	1	11	4	+7	23	9	+14	605	403	+202	2	Knockout stage
2	Egypt	3	2	1	10	5	+5	22	12	+10	634	430	+204	2	Knockout stage
3	Algeria	3	2	1	9	6	+3	19	13	+6	592	452	+140	2	
4	Zimbabwe	3	0	3	0	15	−15	0	30	−30	84	630	−546	0	

Source: TS
(H) Host
- Egypt vs Zimbabwe

Egypt
5
Lugogo Arena, Court 3
14 February 2022 14:30

Zimbabwe
0

			1	2	3
1	(Egypt) (Zimbabwe)	Nour Ahmed Youssri; Nyasha Kopolo	21; 0	21; 0
2	(Egypt) (Zimbabwe)	Hana Tarek; Rumbidzai Ruwende	21; 0	21; 0
3	(Egypt) (Zimbabwe)	Jana Abdelkader; Ashyline Sibiya	21; 0	21; 0
4	(Egypt) (Zimbabwe)	Doha Hany / Hana Tarek; Nyasha Kopolo / Jestina Taruvinga	21; 0	21; 0
5	(Egypt) (Zimbabwe)	Nour Ahmed Youssri / Jana Ashraf; Rumbidzai Ruwende / Ashyline Sibiya	21; 0	21; 0

- Algeria vs Uganda

Algeria
1
Lugogo Arena, Court 1
14 February 2022 18:30

Uganda
4

			1	2	3
1	(Algeria) (Uganda)	Halla Bouksani; Fadilah Mohamed Rafi	8; 21	15; 21
2	(Algeria) (Uganda)	Yasmina Chibah; Tracy Naluwooza	9; 21	16; 21
3	(Algeria) (Uganda)	Tanina Mammeri; Husina Kobugabe	8; 21	19; 21
4	(Algeria) (Uganda)	Halla Bouksani / Linda Mazri; Brenda Awor / Tracy Naluwooza	13; 21	18; 21
5	(Algeria) (Uganda)	Mounib Celia / Tanina Mammeri; Husina Kobugabe / Fadilah Mohamed Rafi	21; 17	21; 14

- Algeria vs Zimbabwe

Algeria
5
Lugogo Arena, Court 3
15 February 2022 9:00

Zimbabwe
0

			1	2	3
1	(Algeria) (Zimbabwe)	Halla Bouksani; Nyasha Kopolo	21; 5	21; 2
2	(Algeria) (Zimbabwe)	Linda Mazri; Ashyline Sibiya	21; 6	21; 2
3	(Algeria) (Zimbabwe)	Yasmina Chibah; Rumbidzai Ruwende	21; 2	21; 2
4	(Algeria) (Zimbabwe)	Mounib Celia / Yasmina Chibah; Nyasha Kopolo / Ashyline Sibiya	21; 2	21; 7
5	(Algeria) (Zimbabwe)	Linda Mazri / Malak Ouchefoun; Rumbidzai Ruwende / Jestina Taruvinga	21; 2	21; 4

- Egypt vs Uganda

Egypt
3
Lugogo Arena, Court 2
15 February 2022 14:00

Uganda
2

			1	2	3
1	(Egypt) (Uganda)	Doha Hany; Fadilah Mohamed Rafi	21; 13	21; 14
2	(Egypt) (Uganda)	Nour Ahmed Youssri; Tracy Naluwooza	17; 21	21; 8	21; 15
3	(Egypt) (Uganda)	Hana Tarek; Husina Kobugabe	11; 21	21; 14	7; 21
4	(Egypt) (Uganda)	Nour Ahmed Youssri / Jana Abdelkader; Tracy Naluwooza / Rajab Shamsa Mbira	21; 12	21; 15
5	(Egypt) (Uganda)	Doha Hany / Hana Tarek; Husina Kobugabe / Fadilah Mohamed Rafi	10; 21	13; 21

- Egypt vs Algeria

Egypt
2
Lugogo Arena, Court 2
16 February 2022 9:00

Algeria
3

			1	2	3
1	(Egypt) (Algeria)	Doha Hany; Halla Bouksani	15; 21	12; 21
2	(Egypt) (Algeria)	Nour Ahmed Youssri; Yasmina Chibah	21; 19	21; 17
3	(Egypt) (Algeria)	Jana Abdelkader; Tanina Mammeri	18; 21	21; 16	18; 21
4	(Egypt) (Algeria)	Jana Abdelkader / Hana Tarek; Linda Mazri / Malak Ouchefoun	17; 21	18; 21
5	(Egypt) (Algeria)	Nour Ahmed Youssri / Doha Hany; Mounib Celia / Tanina Mammeri	16; 21	21; 18	21; 17

- Uganda vs Zimbabwe

Uganda
5
Lugogo Arena, Court 3
16 February 2022 9:00

Zimbabwe
0

			1	2	3
1	(Uganda) (Zimbabwe)	Fadilah Mohamed Rafi; Nyasha Kopolo	21; 5	21; 4
2	(Uganda) (Zimbabwe)	Tracy Naluwooza; Ashyline Sibiya	21; 4	21; 4
3	(Uganda) (Zimbabwe)	Husina Kobugabe; Jestina Taruvinga	21; 5	21; 5
4	(Uganda) (Zimbabwe)	Husina Kobugabe / Fadilah Mohamed Rafi; Nyasha Kopolo / Ashyline Sibiya	21; 6	21; 4
5	(Uganda) (Zimbabwe)	Tracy Naluwooza / Sharifah Wanyana; Rumbidzai Ruwende / Jestina Taruvinga	21; 6	21; 7

=== Knockout stage ===
==== Bracket ====
The draw was conducted on 15 February 2022 after the last match of the group stage.

Semi-finals
16 February
Mauritius	0
Egypt	3
16 February
South Africa	0
Uganda	3

Final
17 February
Egypt	3
Uganda	1

==== Semi-finals ====
===== Mauritius vs Egypt =====
Mauritius
0
Lugogo Arena Court 1
16 February 2022 18:00 UTC+3

Egypt
3

			1	2	3
1	(Mauritius) (Egypt)	Kobita Dookhee; Nour Ahmed Youssri	12; 21	21; 18	16; 21
2	(Mauritius) (Egypt)	Vilina Appiah; Hana Tarek	16; 21	14; 21
3	(Mauritius) (Egypt)	Tiya Bhurtun; Jana Abdelkader	12; 21	21; 12	20; 22
4	(Mauritius) (Egypt)	Lorna Bodha / Kobita Dookhee; Doha Hany / Hana Tarek				not played
5	(Mauritius) (Egypt)	Vilina Appiah / Tiya Bhurtun; Nour Ahmed Youssri / Jana Abdelkader				not played

===== South Africa vs Uganda =====
South Africa
0
Lugogo Arena Court 2
16 February 2022 18:00 UTC+3

Uganda
3

			1	2	3
1	(South Africa) (Uganda)	Deidre Laurens Jordaan; Fadilah Mohamed Rafi	15; 21	13; 21
2	(South Africa) (Uganda)	Diane Olivier; Tracy Naluwooza	11; 21	18; 21
3	(South Africa) (Uganda)	Amy Ackerman; Husina Kobugabe	12; 21	18; 21
4	(South Africa) (Uganda)	Amy Ackerman / Deidre Laurens Jordaan; Brenda Awor / Tracy Naluwooza				not played
5	(South Africa) (Uganda)	Demi Botha / Diane Olivier; Husina Kobugabe / Fadilah Mohamed Rafi				not played

==== Final ====
===== Egypt vs Uganda =====
Egypt
3
Lugogo Arena Court 2
17 February 2022 16:30 UTC+3

Uganda
1

			1	2	3
1	(Egypt) (Uganda)	Doha Hany; Fadilah Mohamed Rafi	12; 21	21; 18	21; 18
2	(Egypt) (Uganda)	Nour Ahmed Youssri; Tracy Naluwooza	21; 14	21; 18
3	(Egypt) (Uganda)	Jana Abdelkader; Husina Kobugabe	8; 21	8; 21
4	(Egypt) (Uganda)	Doha Hany / Jana Abdelkader; Brenda Awor / Tracy Naluwooza	18; 21	21; 19	23; 21
5	(Egypt) (Uganda)	Nour Ahmed Youssri / Hana Tarek; Husina Kobugabe / Fadilah Mohamed Rafi				not played

=== Final ranking ===
Pos	Team	Pld	W	L	Pts	MD	GD	PD	Final result
1st place, gold medalist(s)	Egypt	5	4	1	8	+10	+16	+211	Champions
2nd place, silver medalist(s)	Uganda	5	3	2	6	+8	+18	+259	Runners-up
3rd place, bronze medalist(s)	Mauritius	3	1	2	2	−1	−3	−30	Eliminated in semi-finals
3rd place, bronze medalist(s)	South Africa	3	1	2	2	−3	−2	+11	Eliminated in semi-finals
5	Algeria	3	2	1	4	+3	+6	+140	Eliminated in group stage
6	Réunion	2	1	1	2	−2	−5	−45	Eliminated in group stage
7	Zimbabwe	3	0	3	0	−15	−30	−546	Eliminated in group stage
