= 2021 African Junior Badminton Championships =

Tournament details
- Dates: 27–29 August (Team event); 31 August – 5 September (Individual event)
- Edition: 13th
- Venue: Stade de l’Amitié Badminton Hall
- Location: Cotonou, Benin

The 2021 African Junior Badminton Championships were the continental badminton championships to crown the best youth players and teams across Africa. The tournament was held at the Stade de l'Amitié Badminton Hall in Cotonou, Benin, from 27 August to 5 September 2021.

== Tournament ==
The 2021 African Junior Badminton Championships were held in two separate events. The mixed team event, officially All Africa U-19 Mixed Team Championships 2021, was a continental tournament to crown the best team in Africa. A total of 10 countries across Africa registered their players to compete at mixed team event.

The individual event, officially All Africa U-19 Individual Championships 2021, was a continental tournament to crown the best players in Africa holding from 31 August to 5 September.

=== Venue ===
This tournament was held at the Stade de l'Amitié Badminton Hall in Cotonou with three courts.

== Medalists ==
Event	Gold	Silver	Bronze
Teams	South Africa; W. J. Bestbier; Caden Kakora; Johan Oberholzer; Barco Scheffer; Keaton Stansfeld; Robert White; Diane Olivier; Amy Ackerman; Inette Kotze; Tamsyn Smith; Michaela Ohlson	Egypt; Ahmed Elbahnasawy; Abdelrahman Abdelsattar; Moaz Hesham Hassan; Youssif Mohamed; Omar Mohamed Sherif; Nour Ahmed Youssri; Jana Abdelkader; Kawther Mohamed Rabee; Nour Refaat; Ganna Elwazery	Uganda; Expedito Emuddu; Paul Makande; Abed Bukenya; Abdul Swaburuh Ssempiri; Guna Kusal Dhulupudi; Fadilah Mohamed Rafi; Tracy Naluwooza
Teams	South Africa; W. J. Bestbier; Caden Kakora; Johan Oberholzer; Barco Scheffer; Keaton Stansfeld; Robert White; Diane Olivier; Amy Ackerman; Inette Kotze; Tamsyn Smith; Michaela Ohlson	Egypt; Ahmed Elbahnasawy; Abdelrahman Abdelsattar; Moaz Hesham Hassan; Youssif Mohamed; Omar Mohamed Sherif; Nour Ahmed Youssri; Jana Abdelkader; Kawther Mohamed Rabee; Nour Refaat; Ganna Elwazery	Mauritius; Lucas Douce; Khemtish Nundah; Hanuman Pravish; Rohissen Soobramanien; Pranav Bhaugeerothee; Vilina Appiah; Tiya Bhurtun; Layna Luxmi Chiniah; Kritisha Mungrah
Boys' singles	(South Africa) Caden Kakora	(South Africa) Robert White	(Egypt) Ahmed Elbahnasawy
Boys' singles	(South Africa) Caden Kakora	(South Africa) Robert White	(Benin) Oswald Ash Fano-Dosh
Girls' singles	(Egypt) Nour Ahmed Youssri	(South Africa) Amy Ackerman	(Uganda) Tracy Naluwooza
Girls' singles	(Egypt) Nour Ahmed Youssri	(South Africa) Amy Ackerman	(Egypt) Kawther Mohamed Rabee
Boys' doubles	(South Africa) Caden Kakora (South Africa) Robert White	(Egypt) Abdelrahman Abdelsattar (Egypt) Ahmed Elbahnasawy	(Uganda) Expedito Emuddu (Uganda) Paul Makande
Boys' doubles	(South Africa) Caden Kakora (South Africa) Robert White	(Egypt) Abdelrahman Abdelsattar (Egypt) Ahmed Elbahnasawy	(Mauritius) Lucas Douce (Mauritius) Khemtish Nundah
Girls' doubles	(South Africa) Amy Ackerman (South Africa) Diane Olivier	(Egypt) Nour Ahmed Youssri (Egypt) Jana Abdelkader	(Cameroon) Madeleine Akoumba Ze (Cameroon) Maeva Anamba
Girls' doubles	(South Africa) Amy Ackerman (South Africa) Diane Olivier	(Egypt) Nour Ahmed Youssri (Egypt) Jana Abdelkader	(Uganda) Fadilah Mohamed Rafi (Uganda) Tracy Naluwooza
Mixed doubles	(South Africa) Robert White (South Africa) Amy Ackerman	(South Africa) Caden Kakora (South Africa) Diane Olivier	(Egypt) Ahmed Elbahnasawy (Egypt) Nour Ahmed Youssri
Mixed doubles	(South Africa) Robert White (South Africa) Amy Ackerman	(South Africa) Caden Kakora (South Africa) Diane Olivier	(Mauritius) Khemtish Nundah (Mauritius) Vilina Appiah

=== Medal table ===
* Host nation (Benin)

Rank	Nation	Gold	Silver	Bronze	Total
1	South Africa	5	3	0	8
2	Egypt	1	3	3	7
3	Uganda	0	0	4	4
4	Mauritius	0	0	3	3
5	Benin*	0	0	1	1
5	Cameroon	0	0	1	1
Totals (6 entries)		6	6	12	24

== Team event ==
=== Group A ===
Pos	Team	Pld	W	L	MF	MA	MD	GF	GA	GD	PF	PA	PD	Pts	Qualification
1	South Africa	4	4	0	20	0	+20	40	0	+40	840	327	+513	4	Advance to semi-finals
2	Mauritius	4	3	1	14	6	+8	28	12	+16	734	469	+265	3	Advance to semi-finals
3	Benin (H)	4	2	2	10	10	0	22	20	+2	667	656	+11	2	
4	Botswana	4	1	3	4	16	−12	6	34	−28	399	811	−412	1	
5	Burkina Faso	4	0	4	2	18	−16	6	34	−28	423	802	−379	0	

Source: tournamentsoftware.com
(H) Host

==== South Africa vs Burkina Faso ====
South Africa
5
Stade de l’Amitié Badminton Hall, Court 2
27 August 2021, 08:30 UTC+1

Burkina Faso
0

			1	2	3
1	(South Africa) (Burkina Faso)	Robert White / Amy Ackerman; Mohamadi Ouédraogo / Carine Ouédraogo	21; 2	21; 4
2	(South Africa) (Burkina Faso)	Caden Kakora; Aboul Fatao Tapsoba	21; 4	21; 6
3	(South Africa) (Burkina Faso)	Amy Ackerman; Carolle Sonde	21; 8	21; 6
4	(South Africa) (Burkina Faso)	Johan Oberholzer / Keaton Stansfeld; Mohamadi Ouédraogo / Aboul Fatao Tapsoba	21; 7	21; 13
5	(South Africa) (Burkina Faso)	Diane Olivier / Tamsyn Smith; Carine Ouédraogo / Carolle Sonde	21; 6	21; 3

==== Mauritius vs Botswana ====
Mauritius
5
Stade de l’Amitié Badminton Hall, Court 1
27 August 2021, 08:30 UTC+1

Botswana
0

			1	2	3
1	(Mauritius) (Botswana)	Khemtish Nundah / Kritisha Mungrah; Pakarae Marenga / Kesego Hamo	21; 4	21; 4
2	(Mauritius) (Botswana)	Lucas Douce; Sedietso Oreemetse	21; 5	21; 11
3	(Mauritius) (Botswana)	Vilina Appiah; Kelebogile Mongunda	21; 8	21; 10
4	(Mauritius) (Botswana)	Lucas Douce / Khemtish Nundah; Pakarae Marenga / Sedietso Oreemetse	21; 3	21; 2
5	(Mauritius) (Botswana)	Vilina Appiah / Kritisha Mungrah; Kesego Hamo / Kelebogile Mongunda	21; 12	21; 13

==== Benin vs Burkina Faso ====
Benin
5
Stade de l’Amitié Badminton Hall, Court 1
27 August 2021, 11:00 UTC+1

Burkina Faso
0

			1	2	3
1	(Benin) (Burkina Faso)	Preferet Adomahou; Aboul Fatao Tapsoba	21; 14	20; 22	21; 16
2	(Benin) (Burkina Faso)	Pernelle Fabossou; Carolle Sonde	21; 12	21; 9
3	(Benin) (Burkina Faso)	Oswald Ash Fano-Dosh / Carlos Kpanou; Mohamadi Ouédraogo / Aboul Fatao Tapsoba	21; 9	21; 10
4	(Benin) (Burkina Faso)	Pernelle Fabossou / Ruth Zannou; Carine Ouédraogo / Carolle Sonde	21; 16	21; 15
5	(Benin) (Burkina Faso)	Preferet Adomahou / Gracia Akapko; Mohamadi Ouédraogo / Carine Ouédraogo	21; 3	21; 8

==== South Africa vs Botswana ====
South Africa
5
Stade de l’Amitié Badminton Hall, Court 3
27 August 2021, 11:00 UTC+1

Botswana
0

			1	2	3
1	(South Africa) (Botswana)	Caden Kakora; Pakarae Marenga	21; 4	21; 5
2	(South Africa) (Botswana)	Diane Olivier; Kelebogile Mongunda	21; 6	21; 10
3	(South Africa) (Botswana)	Johan Oberholzer / Keaton Stansfeld; Pakarae Marenga / Sedietso Oreemetse	21; 5	21; 7
4	(South Africa) (Botswana)	Amy Ackerman / Tamsyn Smith; Kesego Hamo / Kelebogile Mongunda	21; 4	21; 12
5	(South Africa) (Botswana)	Caden Kakora / Diane Olivier; Pakarae Marenga / Kesego Hamo	21; 3	21; 5

==== Mauritius vs Burkina Faso ====
Mauritius
5
Stade de l’Amitié Badminton Hall, Court 1
27 August 2021, 15:00 UTC+1

Burkina Faso
0

			1	2	3
1	(Mauritius) (Burkina Faso)	Rohissen Soobramanien / Kritisha Mungrah; Aboul Fatao Tapsoba / Carolle Sonde	21; 5	21; 6
2	(Mauritius) (Burkina Faso)	Hanuman Pravish; Mohamadi Ouédraogo	21; 11	21; 5
3	(Mauritius) (Burkina Faso)	Vilina Appiah; Carine Ouédraogo	21; 6	21; 1
4	(Mauritius) (Burkina Faso)	Hanuman Pravish / Rohissen Soobramanien; Mohamadi Ouédraogo / Aboul Fatao Tapsoba	21; 6	21; 2
5	(Mauritius) (Burkina Faso)	Vilina Appiah / Kritisha Mungrah; Carine Ouédraogo / Carolle Sonde	21; 4	21; 13

==== South Africa vs Benin ====
South Africa
5
Stade de l’Amitié Badminton Hall, Court 2
27 August 2021, 17:30 UTC+1

Benin
0

			1	2	3
1	(South Africa) (Benin)	Caden Kakora; Oswald Ash Fano-Dosh	21; 17	21; 11
2	(South Africa) (Benin)	Diane Olivier; Pernelle Fabossou	21; 9	21; 11
3	(South Africa) (Benin)	Caden Kakora / Robert White; Preferet Adomahou / Oswald Ash Fano-Dosh	21; 8	21; 12
4	(South Africa) (Benin)	Amy Ackerman / Diane Olivier; Pernelle Fabossou / Ruth Zannou	21; 6	21; 5
5	(South Africa) (Benin)	Robert White / Amy Ackerman; Preferet Adomahou / Pernelle Fabossou	21; 3	21; 9

==== Botswana vs Burkina Faso ====
Botswana
3
Stade de l’Amitié Badminton Hall, Court 3
28 August 2021, 09:00 UTC+1

Burkina Faso
2

			1	2	3
1	(Botswana) (Burkina Faso)	Sedietso Oreemetse / Kesego Hamo; Mohamadi Ouédraogo / Carine Ouédraogo	21; 19	22; 24	21; 19
2	(Botswana) (Burkina Faso)	Pakarae Marenga; Aboul Fatao Tapsoba	9; 21	6; 21
3	(Botswana) (Burkina Faso)	Kelebogile Mongunda; Carolle Sonde	21; 13	21; 6
4	(Botswana) (Burkina Faso)	Pakarae Marenga / Sedietso Oreemetse; Mohamadi Ouédraogo / Aboul Fatao Tapsoba	12; 21	5; 21
5	(Botswana) (Burkina Faso)	Kesego Hamo / Kelebogile Mongunda; Carine Ouédraogo / Carolle Sonde	14; 8			retired

==== Mauritius vs Benin ====
Mauritius
4
Stade de l’Amitié Badminton Hall, Court 2
28 August 2021, 09:00 UTC+1

Benin
1

			1	2	3
1	(Mauritius) (Benin)	Khemtish Nundah; Oswald Ash Fano-Dosh	14; 21	16; 21
2	(Mauritius) (Benin)	Vilina Appiah; Pernelle Fabossou	21; 9	21; 12
3	(Mauritius) (Benin)	Lucas Douce / Khemtish Nundah; Preferet Adomahou / Carlos Kpanou	21; 11	21; 13
4	(Mauritius) (Benin)	Vilina Appiah / Kritisha Mungrah; Gracia Akapko / Flora Kpogbemabou	21; 5	21; 8
5	(Mauritius) (Benin)	Lucas Douce / Kritisha Mungrah; Oswald Ash Fano-Dosh / Pernelle Fabossou	21; 18	21; 10

==== Benin vs Botswana ====
Benin
4
Stade de l’Amitié Badminton Hall, Court 2
28 August 2021, 14:30 UTC+1

Botswana
1

			1	2	3
1	(Benin) (Botswana)	Preferet Adomahou; Pakarae Marenga	21; 5	21; 2
2	(Benin) (Botswana)	Pernelle Fabossou; Kesego Hamo	21; 10	21; 11
3	(Benin) (Botswana)	Oswald Ash Fano-Dosh / Carlos Kpanou; Pakarae Marenga / Sedietso Oreemetse	21; 6	21; 3
4	(Benin) (Botswana)	Ruth Akouegnon / Ruth Zannou; Kesego Hamo / Kelebogile Mongunda	15; 21	21; 18	14; 21
5	(Benin) (Botswana)	Oswald Ash Fano-Dosh / Pernelle Fabossou; Sedietso Oreemetse / Kelebogile Mongunda	21; 6	21; 11

==== South Africa vs Mauritius ====
South Africa
5
Stade de l’Amitié Badminton Hall, Court 1
28 August 2021, 14:00 UTC+1

Mauritius
0

			1	2	3
1	(South Africa) (Mauritius)	Robert White / Amy Ackerman; Khemtish Nundah / Vilina Appiah	21; 11	21; 10
2	(South Africa) (Mauritius)	Caden Kakora; Lucas Douce	21; 8	21; 15
3	(South Africa) (Mauritius)	Diane Olivier; Layna Luxmi Chiniah	21; 16	21; 14
4	(South Africa) (Mauritius)	Caden Kakora / Robert White; Lucas Douce / Khemtish Nundah	21; 12	21; 13
5	(South Africa) (Mauritius)	Amy Ackerman / Diane Olivier; Vilina Appiah / Kritisha Mungrah	21; 9	21; 8

=== Group B ===
Pos	Team	Pld	W	L	MF	MA	MD	GF	GA	GD	PF	PA	PD	Pts	Qualification
1	Egypt	4	4	0	20	0	+20	40	0	+40	852	358	+494	4	Advance to semi-finals
2	Uganda	4	3	1	17	3	+14	34	7	+27	809	402	+407	3	Advance to semi-finals
3	Ghana	4	2	2	10	10	0	20	20	0	621	546	+75	2	
4	Niger	4	1	3	3	17	−14	6	34	−28	361	793	−432	1	
5	Burundi	4	0	4	2	18	−16	4	36	−32	261	812	−551	0	

Source: tournamentsoftware.com

==== Egypt vs Niger ====
Egypt
5
Stade de l’Amitié Badminton Hall, Court 3
27 August 2021, 08:30 UTC+1

Niger
0

			1	2	3
1	(Egypt) (Niger)	Abdelrahman Abdelsattar / Jana Abdelkader; Abdoulnasser Issiakou Chaibou / Lariatou Adamou	21; 2	21; 3
2	(Egypt) (Niger)	Ahmed Elbahnasawy; Issoufou Hamadou	21; 7	21; 8
3	(Egypt) (Niger)	Nour Ahmed Youssri; Rekia Ibrah Mato	21; 2	21; 1
4	(Egypt) (Niger)	Moaz Hesham Hassan / Youssif Mohamed; Abdoulnasser Issiakou Chaibou / Issoufou Hamadou	21; 13	21; 10
5	(Egypt) (Niger)	Kawther Mohamed Rabee / Nour Refaat; Lariatou Adamou / Rekia Ibrah Mato	21; 2	21; 4

==== Uganda vs Burundi ====
Uganda
Walkover
Stade de l’Amitié Badminton Hall, Court 2
27 August 2021, 11:00 UTC+1

Burundi
-

		1	2	3
1	(Uganda) (Burundi)
2	(Uganda) (Burundi)
3	(Uganda) (Burundi)
4	(Uganda) (Burundi)
5	(Uganda) (Burundi)

==== Ghana vs Niger ====
Ghana
5
Stade de l’Amitié Badminton Hall, Court 1
27 August 2021, 15:00 UTC+1

Niger
0

			1	2	3
1	(Ghana) (Niger)	Evans Mensah / Cindy Tornyenyor; Issoufou Hamadou / Rekia Ibrah Mato	21; 14	21; 10
2	(Ghana) (Niger)	Michael Botwe; Abdoulnasser Issiakou Chaibou	21; 11	21; 12
3	(Ghana) (Niger)	Prospera Nantuo; Lariatou Adamou	21; 0	21; 1
4	(Ghana) (Niger)	Emmanuel Amoako / Elvis Osei; Issoufou Hamadou / Abdoulnasser Issiakou Chaibou	21; 6	21; 10
5	(Ghana) (Niger)	Prospera Nantuo / Cindy Tornyenyor; Lariatou Adamou / Rekia Ibrah Mato	21; 1	21; 2

==== Egypt vs Burundi ====
Egypt
5
Stade de l’Amitié Badminton Hall, Court 3
27 August 2021, 15:00 UTC+1

Burundi
0

			1	2	3
1	(Egypt) (Burundi)	Ahmed Elbahnasawy / Jana Abdelkader; Devy Marc Muvunyi / Berthila Niyomwungere	21; 1	21; 5
2	(Egypt) (Burundi)	Abdelrahman Abdelsattar; Patrick-Adonis Munezero	21; 8	21; 4
3	(Egypt) (Burundi)	Nour Ahmed Youssri; Kelly-Janviere Iradukunda	21; 3	21; 8
4	(Egypt) (Burundi)	Moaz Hesham Hassan / Youssif Mohamed; Patrick-Adonis Munezero / Devy Marc Muvunyi	21; 1	21; 2
5	(Egypt) (Burundi)	Kawther Mohamed Rabee / Nour Refaat; Kelly-Janviere Iradukunda / Berthila Niyomwungere	21; 5	21; 5

==== Egypt vs Ghana ====
Egypt
5
Stade de l’Amitié Badminton Hall, Court 1
27 August 2021, 17:30 UTC+1

Ghana
0

			1	2	3
1	(Egypt) (Ghana)	Ahmed Elbahnasawy / Jana Abdelkader; Michael Botwe / Prospera Nantuo	21; 5	21; 8
2	(Egypt) (Ghana)	Abdelrahman Abdelsattar; Emmanuel Amoako	21; 11	21; 13
3	(Egypt) (Ghana)	Nour Ahmed Youssri; Rachael Quarcoo	21; 4	21; 2
4	(Egypt) (Ghana)	Abdelrahman Abdelsattar / Ahmed Elbahnasawy; Emmanuel Amoako / Evans Mensah	21; 6	21; 14
5	(Egypt) (Ghana)	Jana Abdelkader / Nour Ahmed Youssri; Prospera Nantuo / Cindy Tornyenyor	21; 6	21; 16

==== Uganda vs Niger ====
Uganda
5
Stade de l’Amitié Badminton Hall, Court 3
27 August 2021, 17:30 UTC+1

Niger
0

			1	2	3
1	(Uganda) (Niger)	Abed Bukenya / Tracy Naluwooza; Abdoulnasser Issiakou Chaibou / Rekia Ibrah Mato	21; 6	21; 5
2	(Uganda) (Niger)	Guna Kusal Dhulupudi; Issoufou Hamadou	21; 17	21; 16
3	(Uganda) (Niger)	Fadilah Mohamed Rafi; Lariatou Adamou	21; 1	21; 2
4	(Uganda) (Niger)	Abed Bukenya / Abdul Swaburuh Ssempiri; Issoufou Hamadou / Abdoulnasser Issiakou Chaibou	21; 11	21; 6
5	(Uganda) (Niger)	Fadilah Mohamed Rafi / Tracy Naluwooza; Lariatou Adamou / Rekia Ibrah Mato	21; 0	21; 0

==== Burundi vs Niger ====
Burundi
2
Stade de l’Amitié Badminton Hall, Court 1
28 August 2021, 09:00 UTC+1

Niger
3

			1	2	3
1	(Burundi) (Niger)	Devy Marc Muvunyi / Berthila Niyomwungere; Abdoulnasser Issiakou Chaibou / Lariatou Adamou	16; 21	17; 21
2	(Burundi) (Niger)	Patrick-Adonis Munezero; Issoufou Hamadou	16; 21	10; 21
3	(Burundi) (Niger)	Kelly-Janviere Iradukunda; Rekia Ibrah Mato	21; 7	21; 8
4	(Burundi) (Niger)	Patrick-Adonis Munezero / Devy Marc Muvunyi; Issoufou Hamadou / Abdoulnasser Issiakou Chaibou	10; 21	10; 21
5	(Burundi) (Niger)	Kelly-Janviere Iradukunda / Berthila Niyomwungere; Lariatou Adamou / Rekia Ibrah Mato	21; 19	21; 18

==== Uganda vs Ghana ====
Uganda
5
Stade de l’Amitié Badminton Hall, Court 3
28 August 2021, 14:00 UTC+1

Ghana
0

			1	2	3
1	(Uganda) (Ghana)	Expedito Emuddu / Fadilah Mohamed Rafi; Emmanuel Amoako / Prospera Nantuo	21; 14	21; 17
2	(Uganda) (Ghana)	Paul Makande; Elvis Osei	21; 12	24; 22
3	(Uganda) (Ghana)	Tracy Naluwooza; Cindy Tornyenyor	21; 2	21; 7
4	(Uganda) (Ghana)	Expedito Emuddu / Paul Makande; Emmanuel Amoako / Elvis Osei	21; 16	21; 12
5	(Uganda) (Ghana)	Fadilah Mohamed Rafi / Tracy Naluwooza; Prospera Nantuo / Cindy Tornyenyor	21; 6	21; 8

==== Ghana vs Burundi ====
Ghana
5
Stade de l’Amitié Badminton Hall, Court 2
28 August 2021, 17:00 UTC+1

Burundi
0

			1	2	3
1	(Ghana) (Burundi)	Jonathan Ankrah; Patrick-Adonis Munezero	21; 6	21; 6
2	(Ghana) (Burundi)	Gloria Nyame; Kelly-Janviere Iradukunda	21; 7	21; 9
3	(Ghana) (Burundi)	Leslie Addo / Jonathan Ankrah; Patrick-Adonis Munezero / Devy Marc Muvunyi	21; 8	21; 9
4	(Ghana) (Burundi)	Prospera Nantuo / Rachael Quarcoo; Kelly-Janviere Iradukunda / Berthila Niyomwungere	21; 2	21; 4
5	(Ghana) (Burundi)	Evans Mensah / Gloria Nyame; Devy Marc Muvunyi / Berthila Niyomwungere	21; 5	21; 0

==== Egypt vs Uganda ====
Egypt
3
Stade de l’Amitié Badminton Hall, Court 1
28 August 2021, 17:00 UTC+1

Uganda
2

			1	2	3
1	(Egypt) (Uganda)	Ahmed Elbahnasawy / Jana Abdelkader; Expedito Emuddu / Fadilah Mohamed Rafi	17; 21	17; 21
2	(Egypt) (Uganda)	Abdelrahman Abdelsattar; Paul Makande	21; 14	21; 10
3	(Egypt) (Uganda)	Nour Ahmed Youssri; Tracy Naluwooza	21; 14	21; 5
4	(Egypt) (Uganda)	Abdelrahman Abdelsattar / Ahmed Elbahnasawy; Expedito Emuddu / Paul Makande	21; 16	21; 13
5	(Egypt) (Uganda)	Nour Ahmed Youssri / Jana Abdelkader; Fadilah Mohamed Rafi / Tracy Naluwooza	22; 20	18; 21	22; 24

=== Knockout stage ===
Semi-finals
1	South Africa	3
4	Uganda	1
3	Mauritius	2
2	Egypt	3

Final
1	South Africa	3
2	Egypt	1

==== Semi-finals ====
South Africa
3
Stade de l’Amitié Badminton Hall, Court 1
29 August 2021, 09:00 UTC+1

Uganda
1

			1	2	3
1	(South Africa) (Uganda)	Robert White / Amy Ackerman; Paul Makande / Tracy Naluwooza	21; 7	21; 6
2	(South Africa) (Uganda)	Caden Kakora; Expedito Emuddu	21; 16	21; 5
3	(South Africa) (Uganda)	Diane Olivier; Fadilah Mohamed Rafi	6; 21	17; 21
4	(South Africa) (Uganda)	Caden Kakora / Robert White; Expedito Emuddu / Paul Makande	21; 15	21; 4
5	(South Africa) (Uganda)	Amy Ackerman / Diane Olivier; Fadilah Mohamed Rafi / Tracy Naluwooza				not played

Egypt
3
Stade de l’Amitié Badminton Hall, Court 2
29 August 2021, 09:00 UTC+1

Mauritius
2

			1	2	3
1	(Egypt) (Mauritius)	Abdelrahman Abdelsattar; Lucas Douce	17; 21	13; 21
2	(Egypt) (Mauritius)	Nour Ahmed Youssri; Vilina Appiah	21; 8	21; 4
3	(Egypt) (Mauritius)	Ahmed Elbahnasawy / Abdelrahman Abdelsattar; Lucas Douce / Khemtish Nundah	18; 21	21; 18	12; 21
4	(Egypt) (Mauritius)	Nour Ahmed Youssri / Jana Abdelkader; Layna Luxmi Chiniah / Kritisha Mungrah	21; 13	21; 10
5	(Egypt) (Mauritius)	Ahmed Elbahnasawy / Jana Abdelkader; Khemtish Nundah / Vilina Appiah	21; 19	16; 21	21; 18

==== Final ====
South Africa
3
Stade de l’Amitié Badminton Hall, Court 1
29 August 2021, 15:00 UTC+1

Egypt
1

			1	2	3
1	(South Africa) (Egypt)	Robert White / Amy Ackerman; Abdelrahman Abdelsattar / Jana Abdelkader	21; 6	21; 7
2	(South Africa) (Egypt)	Caden Kakora; Ahmed Elbahnasawy	21; 9	21; 17
3	(South Africa) (Egypt)	Diane Olivier; Nour Ahmed Youssri	15; 21	11; 21
4	(South Africa) (Egypt)	Caden Kakora / Robert White; Ahmed Elbahnasawy / Abdelrahman Abdelsattar	21; 13	21; 12
5	(South Africa) (Egypt)	Amy Ackerman / Diane Olivier; Nour Ahmed Youssri / Jana Abdelkader				not played

=== Final ranking ===
Pos	Team	Pld	W	L	Pts	MD	GD	PD	Final result
1st place, gold medalist(s)	South Africa	6	6	0	6	+24	+52	+613	Champions
2nd place, silver medalist(s)	Egypt	6	5	1	4	+19	+39	+476	Runners-up
3rd place, bronze medalist(s)	Mauritius	5	3	1	3	+7	+14	+237	Eliminated in semi-finals
3rd place, bronze medalist(s)	Uganda	4	3	1	3	+12	+23	+353	Eliminated in semi-finals
5	Ghana	4	2	2	2	0	0	+75	Eliminated in group stage
6	Benin	4	2	2	2	0	+2	+11	Eliminated in group stage
7	Botswana	4	1	2	1	−12	−28	−412	Eliminated in group stage
8	Niger	4	1	2	1	−14	−28	−432	Eliminated in group stage
9	Burkina Faso	4	0	2	0	−16	−28	−379	Eliminated in group stage
10	Burundi	3	0	2	0	−16	−32	−551	Eliminated in group stage

== Individual event ==
=== Boys' singles ===
Semifinals
5	(South Africa) Robert White	21	21
7	(Benin) Oswald Ash Fano-Dosh	14	14
(Egypt) Ahmed Elbahnasawy	13	14
2	(South Africa) Caden Kakora	21	21

Final
5	(South Africa) Robert White	16	17
7	(South Africa) Caden Kakora	21	21

=== Girls' singles ===
Semifinals
1	(Egypt) Nour Ahmed Youssri	21	21
3	(Uganda) Tracy Naluwooza	15	10
5	(South Africa) Amy Ackerman	21	21
(Egypt) Kawther Mohamed Rabee	8	13

Final
1	(Egypt) Nour Ahmed Youssri	21	21
5	(South Africa) Amy Ackerman	13	15

=== Boys' doubles ===
Semifinals
(Egypt) Ahmed Elbahnasawy (Egypt) Abdelrahman Abdelsattar	21	21
4	(Uganda) Expedito Emuddu (Uganda) Paul Makande	12	16
3	(Mauritius) Lucas Douce (Mauritius) Khemtish Nundah
2	(South Africa) Caden Kakora (South Africa) Robert White	w	/	o

Final
(Egypt) Ahmed Elbahnasawy (Egypt) Abdelrahman Abdelsattar	14	19
2	(South Africa) Caden Kakora (South Africa) Robert White	21	21

=== Girls' doubles ===
Semifinals
1	(Uganda) Fadilah Mohamed Rafi (Uganda) Tracy Naluwooza	21	16	14
(South Africa) Amy Ackerman (South Africa) Diane Olivier	16	21	21
(Egypt) Nour Ahmed Youssri (Egypt) Jana Abdelkader	21	21
2	(Cameroon) Madeleine Akoumba Ze (Cameroon) Maeva Anamba	5	9

Final
(South Africa) Amy Ackerman (South Africa) Diane Olivier	21	26
2	(Egypt) Nour Ahmed Youssri (Egypt) Jana Abdelkader	19	24

=== Mixed doubles ===
Semifinals
(South Africa) Robert White (South Africa) Amy Ackerman	w	/	o
4	(Mauritius) Khemtish Nundah (Mauritius) Vilina Appiah
(Egypt) Ahmed Elbahnasawy (Egypt) Nour Ahmed Youssri	16	17
2	(South Africa) Caden Kakora (South Africa) Diane Olivier	21	21

Final
(South Africa) Robert White (South Africa) Amy Ackerman	21	21
2	(South Africa) Caden Kakora (South Africa) Diane Olivier	17	14
