= Badminton Federation of Nigeria =

National governing body

- Sport: Badminton
- Abbreviation: BFN
- Affiliation: BWF
- Regional affiliation: Badminton Confederation of Africa
- Headquarters: Abuja, Nigeria
- Location: National Sports Commission, National Stadium
- President: Francis Orbih
- Vice president: Mohammed Maina

Official website
- badmintonnigeria.org
- (Nigeria)

The Badminton Federation of Nigeria is the national governing body that oversees and manages affairs related to the sport of badminton in Nigeria. The federation was formed in 1998. The body is affiliated to the Badminton Confederation of Africa. It controls all badminton related activities across Nigeria.
