= Badminton South Africa =

Sports governing body in South Africa

- Sport: Badminton
- Abbreviation: BSA
- Founded: 1938
- Affiliation: BWF
- Affiliation date: 1939
- Regional affiliation: Badminton Confederation of Africa
- Headquarters: 279 West Avenue, Centurion, Gauteng
- President: Larry Keys

Official website
- www.badmintonsa.co.za
- (South Africa)

Badminton South Africa is the national governing body that oversees and manages affairs related to the sport of badminton in South Africa. The body is affiliated to the BWF and Badminton Confederation of Africa. The association was founded in 1938, as the South African Badminton Union (SABU) and had a name change in 1998. It is made up of 14 provincial associations and 13 districts. Its teams compete at Sudirman Cup, World Championships, Thomas Cup and Uber Cup (for women).

== History ==
Shortly after its inception in 1939, the association was affiliated as a member of the Badminton World Federation, known at that time as International Badminton Federation (IBF). Despite the early founding in 1938, the first championship in South Africa were not held until 1948. Due to the policy of apartheid in South Africa, the association was excluded from international sporting events from 1970 to 1992. With the end of racial segregation, Badminton South Africa consequently became a member of the continental governing body African Badminton Confederation.

== See also ==
- South Africa International
- South Africa national badminton team
- South African Badminton Championships
- Melvill Cup

== Bibliography ==
- Pat Davis: The Encyclopaedia of Badminton. Robert Hale, London, 1987, S. 157, ISBN 0-7090-2796-6
