= 2016 African Junior Badminton Championships =

Tournament details
- Dates: 23–25 August (Team event); 26–28 August (Individual event)
- Edition: 12th
- Venue: Mohammed V Sports Complex
- Location: Casablanca, Morocco

The 2016 African Junior Badminton Championships were the continental badminton championships to crown the best youth players and teams across Africa. The tournament was held at the Mohammed V Sports Complex inside the Stade Mohammed V in Casablanca, Morocco, from 23 to 28 August 2016.

== Tournament ==
The 2016 African Junior Badminton Championships were held in two separate events. The mixed team event, officially All Africa U-19 Mixed Team Championships 2016, was a continental tournament to crown the best team in Africa. A total of 9 countries across Africa registered their players to compete at mixed team event.

The individual event, officially All Africa U-19 Individual Championships 2016, was a continental tournament to crown the best players in Africa holding from 16 to 18 August.

=== Venue ===
This tournament was held at the Mohammed V Sports Complex in Casablanca with four courts.

== Medalists ==
Event	Gold	Silver	Bronze
Teams	Egypt; Youssof Essam Bahnasy; Adham Hatem Elgamal; Mohamed Mostafa Kamel; Rahma Eladawy; Farida Mostafa; Hana Tarek	Algeria; Yacine Belhouane; Samy Khaldi; Sifeddine Larbaoui; Halla Bouksani; Sirine Ibrahim; Linda Mazri	Mauritius; Melvin Appiah; Jean Bernard Bongout; Tejraj Pultoo; Khabir Teeluck; Kobita Dookhee; Shania Leung; Sephora Martin; Ganesha Mungrah
Teams	Egypt; Youssof Essam Bahnasy; Adham Hatem Elgamal; Mohamed Mostafa Kamel; Rahma Eladawy; Farida Mostafa; Hana Tarek	Algeria; Yacine Belhouane; Samy Khaldi; Sifeddine Larbaoui; Halla Bouksani; Sirine Ibrahim; Linda Mazri	South Africa; Pieter Brand; Dillan Schaap; Ruan Snyman; Tarryn Jacobs; Johanita Scholtz; Zani van der Merwe
Boys' singles	(Egypt) Adham Hatem Elgamal	(Zambia) Kalombo Mulenga	(Egypt) Mohamed Mostafa Kamel
Boys' singles	(Egypt) Adham Hatem Elgamal	(Zambia) Kalombo Mulenga	(South Africa) Ruan Snyman
Girls' singles	(Algeria) Halla Bouksani	(Algeria) Linda Mazri	(South Africa) Johanita Scholtz
Girls' singles	(Algeria) Halla Bouksani	(Algeria) Linda Mazri	(Egypt) Hana Tarek
Boys' doubles	(Algeria) Yacine Belhouane (Algeria) Samy Khaldi	(Uganda) Brian Kasirye (Uganda) Davies Senono	(Egypt) Adham Hatem Elgamal (Egypt) Mohamed Mostafa Kamel
Boys' doubles	(Algeria) Yacine Belhouane (Algeria) Samy Khaldi	(Uganda) Brian Kasirye (Uganda) Davies Senono	(Ivory Coast) Alex Patrick Zolobe (Ivory Coast) Franck Emmanuel Zolobe
Girls' doubles	(South Africa) Johanita Scholtz (South Africa) Zani van der Merwe	(Algeria) Sirine Ibrahim (Algeria) Linda Mazri	(Mauritius) Kobita Dookhee (Mauritius) Shania Leung
Girls' doubles	(South Africa) Johanita Scholtz (South Africa) Zani van der Merwe	(Algeria) Sirine Ibrahim (Algeria) Linda Mazri	(Egypt) Farida Mostafa (Egypt) Hana Tarek
Mixed doubles	(Algeria) Yacine Belhouane (Algeria) Sirine Ibrahim	(Algeria) Samy Khaldi (Algeria) Linda Mazri	(Mauritius) Melvin Appiah (Mauritius) Kobita Dookhee
Mixed doubles	(Algeria) Yacine Belhouane (Algeria) Sirine Ibrahim	(Algeria) Samy Khaldi (Algeria) Linda Mazri	(Egypt) Adham Hatem Elgamal (Egypt) Hana Tarek

=== Medal table ===
* Host nation (Morocco)

Rank	Nation	Gold	Silver	Bronze	Total
1	Algeria	3	4	0	7
2	Egypt	2	0	5	7
3	South Africa	1	0	3	4
4	Uganda	0	1	0	1
4	Zambia	0	1	0	1
6	Mauritius	0	0	3	3
7	Ivory Coast	0	0	1	1
Totals (7 entries)		6	6	12	24

== Team event ==
=== Group A ===
Pos	Team	Pld	Pts
1	Egypt	3	3
2	South Africa	3	2
3	Uganda	3	1
4	Seychelles	3	0

Source: BCA

23 August 2016
South Africa	4–1	Uganda
23 August 2016
Egypt	5–0	Seychelles
23 August 2016
South Africa	5–0	Seychelles
23 August 2016
Egypt	4–1	Uganda
24 August 2016
South Africa	2–3	Egypt
24 August 2016
Seychelles	2–3	Uganda

=== Group B ===
Pos	Team	Pld	Pts
1	Algeria	4	4
2	Mauritius	4	3
3	Zambia	4	2
4	Ivory Coast	4	1
5	Morocco (H)	4	0

Source: BCA
(H) Host

23 August 2016
Mauritius	5–0	Ivory Coast
23 August 2016
Algeria	5–0	Morocco
23 August 2016
Mauritius	5–0	Morocco
23 August 2016
Zambia	5–0	Ivory Coast
24 August 2016
Mauritius	3–2	Zambia
24 August 2016
Algeria	5–0	Ivory Coast
24 August 2016
Algeria	4–1	Zambia
24 August 2016
Morocco	1–4	Ivory Coast
24 August 2016
Mauritius	2–3	Algeria
24 August 2016
Zambia	4–1	Morocco

=== Knockout stage ===
Semi-finals
Egypt	3
Mauritius	0
South Africa	2
Algeria	3

Final
Egypt	3
Algeria	1

==== Final ====
Egypt
3
Mohammed V Sports Complex, Court 1
25 August 2016, 18:00 UTC+1

Algeria
1

			1	2	3
1	(Egypt) (Algeria)	Youssef Essam / Moustafa Mohamed; Yacine Belhouane / Samy Khaldi	22; 20	23; 21
2	(Egypt) (Algeria)	Adham Hatem Elgamal; Yacine Belhouane	21; 16	15; 21	21; 14
3	(Egypt) (Algeria)	Rahma Eladawy; Halla Bouksani	14; 21	17; 21
4	(Egypt) (Algeria)	Farida Mostafa / Hana Tarek; Sirine Ibrahim / Linda Mazri	21; 12	24; 22
5	(Egypt) (Algeria)	Adham Hatem Elgamal / Hana Tarek; Samy Khaldi / Linda Mazri				not played

=== Final ranking ===
Pos	Team	Pld	W	L	Pts	MD	Final result
1st place, gold medalist(s)	Egypt	5	5	0	5	+14	Champions
2nd place, silver medalist(s)	Algeria	6	5	1	5	+13	Runners-up
3rd place, bronze medalist(s)	Mauritius	5	3	2	3	+12	Eliminated in semi-finals
3rd place, bronze medalist(s)	South Africa	4	2	2	2	+6	Eliminated in semi-finals
5	Zambia	4	2	2	2	+4	Eliminated in group stage
6	Uganda	3	1	2	1	−5	Eliminated in group stage
7	Ivory Coast	4	1	3	1	−12	Eliminated in group stage
8	Seychelles	3	0	3	0	−11	Eliminated in group stage
9	Morocco (H)	4	0	4	0	−16	Eliminated in group stage

== Individual event ==
=== Boys' singles ===
Semifinals
(Egypt) Mohamed Mostafa Kamel	18	16
(Egypt) Adham Hatem Elgamal	21	21
3	(Zambia) Kalombo Mulenga	21	21
2	(South Africa) Ruan Snyman	15	14

Final
(Egypt) Adham Hatem Elgamal	21	21
3	(Zambia) Kalombo Mulenga	13	13

=== Girls' singles ===
Semifinals
(Algeria) Linda Mazri	21	21
(Egypt) Hana Tarek	16	12
3	(Algeria) Halla Bouksani	21	18	21
2	(South Africa) Johanita Scholtz	13	21	18

Final
(Algeria) Linda Mazri	10	9
3	(Algeria) Halla Bouksani	21	21

=== Boys' doubles ===
Semifinals
1	(Ivory Coast) Alex Patrick Zolobe (Ivory Coast) Franck Emmanuel Zolobe	9	11
(Algeria) Yacine Belhouane (Algeria) Samy Khaldi	21	21
(Uganda) Brian Kasirye (Uganda) Davies Senono	23	21
2	(Egypt) Adham Hatem Elgamal (Egypt) Mohamed Mostafa Kamel	21	19

Final
(Algeria) Yacine Belhouane (Algeria) Samy Khaldi	21	21
(Uganda) Brian Kasirye (Uganda) Davies Senono	14	13

=== Girls' doubles ===
Semifinals
1	(Mauritius) Kobita Dookhee (Mauritius) Shania Leung	12	21	15
(South Africa) Johanita Scholtz (South Africa) Zani van der Merwe	21	17	21
(Algeria) Sirine Ibrahim (Algeria) Linda Mazri	21	15	21
2	(Egypt) Farida Mostafa (Egypt) Hana Tarek	19	21	14

Final
(South Africa) Johanita Scholtz (South Africa) Zani van der Merwe	23	18	21
2	(Algeria) Sirine Ibrahim (Algeria) Linda Mazri	21	21	16

=== Mixed doubles ===
Semifinals
(Algeria) Yacine Belhouane (Algeria) Sirine Ibrahim	21	21
(Egypt) Adham Hatem Elgamal (Egypt) Hana Tarek	17	14
4	(Mauritius) Melvin Appiah (Mauritius) Kobita Dookhee	13	16
(Algeria) Samy Khaldi (Algeria) Linda Mazri	21	21

Final
(Algeria) Yacine Belhouane (Algeria) Sirine Ibrahim	21	21
(Algeria) Samy Khaldi (Algeria) Linda Mazri	14	15
