= 2024 African Junior Badminton Championships =

Tournament details
- Dates: 12–14 August (Team event); 16 August – 18 August (Individual event)
- Edition: 15th
- Venue: Stade Lat-Dior
- Location: Thiès, Senegal

The 2024 African Junior Badminton Championships were the continental badminton championships to crown the best youth players and teams across Africa. The tournament was held at the Stade Lat-Dior in Thiès, Senegal, from 12 to 18 August 2024.

== Tournament ==
The 2024 African Junior Badminton Championships were held in two separate events. The mixed team event, officially All Africa U-19 Mixed Team Championships 2024, was a continental tournament to crown the best team in Africa. A total of 8 countries across Africa registered their players to compete at mixed team event.

The individual event, officially All Africa U-19 Individual Championships 2024, was a continental tournament to crown the best players in Africa holding from 16 to 18 August.

=== Venue ===
This tournament was held at the Stade Lat-Dior in Cotonou with four courts.

== Medalists ==
Event	Gold	Silver	Bronze
Teams	Mauritius; Nyanesh Anand Changea; Lucas Douce; Agnivesh Ragoonundun; Tejas Savoo; Aidan Yu Kiat; Tiya Bhurtun; Layna Luxmi Chiniah; Chiara How Hong; Elsa How Hong; Mia Mi Lin	Egypt; Kareem Hatem; Ziad Hesham; Mahmoud Mohamed Mahmoud; Seif Omar; Omar Refaat; Hadia Elgendy; Alya Elghandour; Reem Hussein; Fatema Rabie; Lojain Wasfy	Algeria; Aimen Daoud; Ayoub Rayan Daoud; Oussama Keddou; Ryane Mazri; Yacine Laichi; Amira Bouhrira; Tinhinane Chila; Manel Hamza; Ines Madi; Deloum Riham
Teams	Mauritius; Nyanesh Anand Changea; Lucas Douce; Agnivesh Ragoonundun; Tejas Savoo; Aidan Yu Kiat; Tiya Bhurtun; Layna Luxmi Chiniah; Chiara How Hong; Elsa How Hong; Mia Mi Lin	Egypt; Kareem Hatem; Ziad Hesham; Mahmoud Mohamed Mahmoud; Seif Omar; Omar Refaat; Hadia Elgendy; Alya Elghandour; Reem Hussein; Fatema Rabie; Lojain Wasfy	South Africa; Timothy Gabriels; Lourens Scheffer; Miguel Vigario; Ricardo Vigario; Hadiyah Carrim; Chloe Lai; Yiwen Li; Anika van der Merwe
Boys' singles	(Mauritius) Lucas Douce	(Mauritius) Aidan Yu Kiat	(Algeria) Aimen Daoud
Boys' singles	(Mauritius) Lucas Douce	(Mauritius) Aidan Yu Kiat	(Egypt) Ziad Hesham
Girls' singles	(Egypt) Reem Hussein	(Egypt) Hadia Elgendy	(Mauritius) Chiara How Hong
Girls' singles	(Egypt) Reem Hussein	(Egypt) Hadia Elgendy	(Egypt) Lojain Wasfy
Boys' doubles	(Mauritius) Lucas Douce (Mauritius) Aidan Yu Kiat	(Algeria) Ayoub Rayan Daoud (Algeria) Oussama Keddou	(Ghana) Leslie Nii Adote Addo (Ghana) Jonathan Ankrah
Boys' doubles	(Mauritius) Lucas Douce (Mauritius) Aidan Yu Kiat	(Algeria) Ayoub Rayan Daoud (Algeria) Oussama Keddou	(Algeria) Aimen Daoud (Algeria) Yacine Laichi
Girls' doubles	(Mauritius) Chiara How Hong (Mauritius) Elsa How Hong	(Egypt) Hadia Elgendy (Egypt) Reem Hussein	(Mauritius) Tiya Bhurtun (Mauritius) Layna Luxmi Chiniah
Girls' doubles	(Mauritius) Chiara How Hong (Mauritius) Elsa How Hong	(Egypt) Hadia Elgendy (Egypt) Reem Hussein	(Egypt) Fatema Rabie (Egypt) Lojain Wasfy
Mixed doubles	(Mauritius) Lucas Douce (Mauritius) Elsa How Hong	(Egypt) Mahmoud Mohamed Mahmoud (Egypt) Fatema Rabie	(Egypt) Ziad Hesham (Egypt) Hadia Elgendy
Mixed doubles	(Mauritius) Lucas Douce (Mauritius) Elsa How Hong	(Egypt) Mahmoud Mohamed Mahmoud (Egypt) Fatema Rabie	(Mauritius) Aidan Yu Kiat (Mauritius) Chiara How Hong

=== Medal table ===
* Host nation (Senegal)

Rank	Nation	Gold	Silver	Bronze	Total
1	Mauritius	5	1	3	9
2	Egypt	1	4	4	9
3	Algeria	0	1	3	4
4	Ghana	0	0	1	1
4	South Africa	0	0	1	1
Totals (5 entries)		6	6	12	24

== Team event ==
=== Group A ===
Pos	Team	Pld	W	L	MF	MA	MD	GF	GA	GD	PF	PA	PD	Pts	Qualification
1	Egypt	3	3	0	14	1	+13	29	4	+25	679	343	+336	3	Advance to Knockout stage
2	Algeria	3	2	1	11	4	+7	24	9	+15	630	428	+202	2	Advance to Knockout stage
3	Tunisia	3	1	2	5	10	−5	10	20	−10	414	504	−90	1	
4	Burundi	3	0	3	0	15	−15	0	30	−30	182	630	−448	0	

Source: tournamentsoftware.com

==== Egypt vs Burundi ====
Egypt
5
Stade Lat-Dior, Court 2
12 August 2024, 10:00 UTC+0

Burundi
0

			1	2	3
1	(Egypt) (Burundi)	Mahmoud Mohamed Mahmoud / Fatema Rabie; Prince Irakoze / Keren Igiraneza	21; 2	21; 4
2	(Egypt) (Burundi)	Seif Omar; Orcella Uwumuhoza	21; 10	21; 7
3	(Egypt) (Burundi)	Reem Hussein; Berthila Niyomwungere	21; 6	21; 3
4	(Egypt) (Burundi)	Kareem Hatem / Ziad Hesham; Prince Irakoze / Orcella Uwumuhoza	21; 2	21; 7
5	(Egypt) (Burundi)	Hadia Elgendy / Lojain Wasfy; Keren Igiraneza / Berthila Niyomwungere	21; 5	21; 2

==== Algeria vs Tunisia ====
Algeria
5
Stade Lat-Dior, Court 1
12 August 2024, 10:00 UTC+0

Tunisia
0

			1	2	3
1	(Algeria) (Tunisia)	Ryane Mazri / Ines Madi; Abderrahmen Trabelsi / Narim Jebali	21; 7	21; 13
2	(Algeria) (Tunisia)	Oussama Keddou; Oubeid Errahmen Kasraoui	21; 6	21; 13
3	(Algeria) (Tunisia)	Amira Bouhrira; Elaa Khedhiri	21; 13	21; 12
4	(Algeria) (Tunisia)	Aimen Daoud / Yacine Laichi; Ahmed Chtioui / Oubeid Errahmen Kasraoui	21; 7	21; 11
5	(Algeria) (Tunisia)	Manel Hamza / Deloum Riham; Narim Jebali / Elaa Khedhiri	21; 19	21; 18

==== Egypt vs Tunisia ====
Egypt
5
Stade Lat-Dior, Court 4
12 August 2024, 15:00 UTC+0

Tunisia
0

			1	2	3
1	(Egypt) (Tunisia)	Ziad Hesham / Hadia Elgendy; Ahmed Chtioui / Narim Jebali	21; 4	21; 7
2	(Egypt) (Tunisia)	Seif Omar; Oubeid Errahmen Kasraoui	21; 7	21; 10
3	(Egypt) (Tunisia)	Reem Hussein; Elaa Khedhiri	21; 10	21; 9
4	(Egypt) (Tunisia)	Kareem Hatem / Mahmoud Mohamed Mahmoud; Ahmed Chtioui / Oubeid Errahmen Kasraoui	21; 8	21; 10
5	(Egypt) (Tunisia)	Fatema Rabie / Lojain Wasfy; Narim Jebali / Elaa Khedhiri	21; 8	21; 12

==== Algeria vs Burundi ====
Algeria
5
Stade Lat-Dior, Court 1
12 August 2024, 15:00 UTC+0

Burundi
0

			1	2	3
1	(Algeria) (Burundi)	Yacine Laichi / Manel Hamza; Orcella Uwumuhoza / Keren Igiraneza	21; 5	21; 4
2	(Algeria) (Burundi)	Aimen Daoud; Bertrand Itanzeneza	21; 4	21; 2
3	(Algeria) (Burundi)	Deloum Riham; Reine Nicole Irumva	21; 4	21; 1
4	(Algeria) (Burundi)	Ayoub Rayan Daoud / Oussama Keddou; Prince Irakoze / Orcella Uwumuhoza	21; 6	21; 13
5	(Algeria) (Burundi)	Hadia Elgendy / Lojain Wasfy; Keren Igiraneza / Reine Nicole Irumva	21; 5	21; 2

==== Tunisia vs Burundi ====
Tunisia
5
Stade Lat-Dior, Court 4
13 August 2024, 10:00 UTC+0

Burundi
0

			1	2	3
1	(Tunisia) (Burundi)	Abderrahmen Trabelsi; Orcella Uwumuhoza	21; 14	21; 6
2	(Tunisia) (Burundi)	Elaa Khedhiri; Berthila Niyomwungere	21; 7	21; 5
3	(Tunisia) (Burundi)	Ahmed Chtioui / Abderrahmen Trabelsi; Prince Irakoze / Orcella Uwumuhoza	21; 10	21; 12
4	(Tunisia) (Burundi)	Fadoua Hachemi / Narim Jebali; Reine Nicole Irumva / Berthila Niyomwungere	21; 6	21; 8
5	(Tunisia) (Burundi)	Oubeid Errahmen Kasraoui / Elaa Khedhiri; Prince Irakoze / Reine Nicole Irumva	21; 12	21; 4

==== Algeria vs Egypt ====
Algeria
1
Stade Lat-Dior, Court 3
13 August 2024, 10:00 UTC+0

Egypt
4

			1	2	3
1	(Algeria) (Egypt)	Oussama Keddou; Seif Omar	16; 21	21; 16	13; 21
2	(Algeria) (Egypt)	Deloum Riham; Reem Hussein	8; 21	11; 21
3	(Algeria) (Egypt)	Aimen Daoud / Yacine Laichi; Mahmoud Mohamed Mahmoud / Seif Omar	18; 21	21; 18	22; 20
4	(Algeria) (Egypt)	Tinhinane Chila / Ines Madi; Hadia Elgendy / Reem Hussein	15; 21	21; 16	10; 21
5	(Algeria) (Egypt)	Aimen Daoud / Lojain Wasfy; Ziad Hesham / Hadia Elgendy	18; 21	16; 21

=== Group B ===
Pos	Team	Pld	W	L	MF	MA	MD	GF	GA	GD	PF	PA	PD	Pts	Qualification
1	Mauritius	3	3	0	14	1	+13	28	3	+25	640	300	+340	3	Advance to Knockout stage
2	South Africa	3	2	1	11	4	+7	23	8	+15	578	362	+216	2	Advance to Knockout stage
3	Benin	3	1	2	5	10	−5	10	21	−11	378	565	−187	1	
4	Senegal (H)	3	0	3	0	15	−15	1	30	−29	276	645	−369	0	

Source: tournamentsoftware.com
(H) Host

==== Mauritius vs Benin ====
Mauritius
5
Stade Lat-Dior, Court 3
12 August 2024, 10:00 UTC+0

Benin
0

			1	2	3
1	(Mauritius) (Benin)	Aidan Yu Kiat / Chiara How Hong; Lewis Kpanou / Blessing Atchade	21; 6	21; 2
2	(Mauritius) (Benin)	Agnivesh Ragoonundun; Jeredy Bassa	21; 12	21; 7
3	(Mauritius) (Benin)	Layna Luxmi Chiniah; Anna Akakpo	21; 3	21; 9
4	(Mauritius) (Benin)	Nyanesh Anand Changea / Tejas Savoo; Jeredy Bassa / Lewis Kpanou	21; 17	21; 14
5	(Mauritius) (Benin)	Elsa How Hong / Mia Mi Lin; Blessing Atchade / Anna Akakpo	21; 9	21; 7

==== South Africa vs Senegal ====
South Africa
5
Stade Lat-Dior, Court 4
12 August 2024, 10:00 UTC+0

Senegal
0

			1	2	3
1	(South Africa) (Senegal)	Miguel Vigario; Demba N'Diaye	21; 6	21; 13
2	(South Africa) (Senegal)	Yiwen Li; Aissatou Faye	21; 10	21; 4
3	(South Africa) (Senegal)	Timothy Gabriels / Lourens Scheffer; Demba N'Diaye / Lamine Traoré	21; 13	21; 10
4	(South Africa) (Senegal)	Chloe Lai / Yiwen Li; Kartoumy Doucouré / Aissatou Ly	21; 6	21; 9
5	(South Africa) (Senegal)	Miguel Vigario / Hadiyah Carrim; Aly Amadou Kane / Aissatou Faye	21; 4	21; 7

==== Mauritius vs Senegal ====
Mauritius
5
Stade Lat-Dior, Court 2
12 August 2024, 15:00 UTC+0

Senegal
0

			1	2	3
1	(Mauritius) (Senegal)	Lucas Douce; Demba N'Diaye	21; 1	21; 1
2	(Mauritius) (Senegal)	Tiya Bhurtun; Aissatou Faye	21; 6	21; 5
3	(Mauritius) (Senegal)	Nyanesh Anand Changea / Tejas Savoo; Demba N'Diaye / Lamine Traoré	21; 4	21; 11
4	(Mauritius) (Senegal)	Layna Luxmi Chiniah / Chiara How Hong; Kartoumy Doucouré / Aissatou Ly	21; 4	21; 6
5	(Mauritius) (Senegal)	Agnivesh Ragoonundun / Mia Mi Lin; Aly Amadou Kane / Aissatou Faye	21; 10	21; 8

==== South Africa vs Benin ====
South Africa
5
Stade Lat-Dior, Court 2
12 August 2024, 15:00 UTC+0

Benin
0

			1	2	3
1	(South Africa) (Benin)	Ricardo Vigario / Chloe Lai; Lewis Kpanou / Anna Akakpo	21; 8	21; 15
2	(South Africa) (Benin)	Miguel Vigario; Jeredy Bassa	21; 7	21; 6
3	(South Africa) (Benin)	Yiwen Li; Blessing Atchade	21; 5	21; 6
4	(South Africa) (Benin)	Timothy Gabriels / Lourens Scheffer; Jeredy Bassa / Lewis Kpanou				w/o
5	(South Africa) (Benin)	Yiwen Li / Anika van der Merwe; Anna Akakpo / Blessing Atchade	21; 11	21; 9

==== Benin vs Senegal ====
Benin
5
Stade Lat-Dior, Court 1
13 August 2024, 10:00 UTC+0

Senegal
0

			1	2	3
1	(Benin) (Senegal)	Lewis Kpanou; Aly Amadou Kane	21; 10	21; 9
2	(Benin) (Senegal)	Anna Akakpo; Aissatou Faye	21; 12	21; 8
3	(Benin) (Senegal)	Kriss-Wisnell Akododja / Pacome Sounouvou; Balla Hanne / Demba N'Diaye	14; 21	22; 20	21; 13
4	(Benin) (Senegal)	Anna Akakpo / Blessing Atchade; Aissatou Faye / Aissatou Ly	21; 16	21; 10
5	(Benin) (Senegal)	Lewis Kpanou / Blessing Atchade; Balla Hanne / Kartoumy Doucouré	21; 12	21; 14

==== Mauritius vs South Africa ====
Mauritius
4
Stade Lat-Dior, Court 2
13 August 2024, 10:00 UTC+0

South Africa
1

			1	2	3
1	(Mauritius) (South Africa)	Agnivesh Ragoonundun / Mia Mi Lin; Ricardo Vigario / Chloe Lai	21; 16	21; 17
2	(Mauritius) (South Africa)	Lucas Douce; Miguel Vigario	21; 7	21; 9
3	(Mauritius) (South Africa)	Elsa How Hong; Yiwen Li	21; 9	21; 6
4	(Mauritius) (South Africa)	Tejas Savoo / Aidan Yu Kiat; Miguel Vigario / Ricardo Vigario	20; 22	15; 21
5	(Mauritius) (South Africa)	Tiya Bhurtun / Layna Luxmi Chiniah; Chloe Lai / Yiwen Li	17; 21	21; 14	21; 16

=== Knockout stage ===
Semi-finals
Egypt	3
South Africa	0
Algeria	0
Mauritius	3

Final
Egypt	1
Mauritius	3

==== Semi-finals ====
Egypt
3
Stade Lat-Dior, Court 1
13 August 2024, 15:30 UTC+0

South Africa
0

			1	2	3
1	(Egypt) (South Africa)	Seif Omar; Miguel Vigario	21; 11	21; 13
2	(Egypt) (South Africa)	Reem Hussein; Yiwen Li	21; 17	21; 16
3	(Egypt) (South Africa)	Ziad Hesham / Seif Omar; Miguel Vigario / Ricardo Vigario	1; 3			retired
4	(Egypt) (South Africa)	Hadia Elgendy / Reem Hussein; Expedito Emuddu / Paul Makande				not played
5	(Egypt) (South Africa)	Ziad Hesham / Hadia Elgendy; Ricardo Vigario / Chloe Lai				not played

Mauritius
3
Stade Lat-Dior, Court 2
13 August 2024, 15:30 UTC+0

Algeria
0

			1	2	3
1	(Mauritius) (Algeria)	Tiya Bhurtun; Lucas Douce	21; 11	21; 18
2	(Mauritius) (Algeria)	Lucas Douce; Aimen Daoud	21; 13	21; 13
3	(Mauritius) (Algeria)	Chiara How Hong / Elsa How Hong; Tinhinane Chila / Manel Hamza	21; 11	21; 13
4	(Mauritius) (Algeria)	Agnivesh Ragoonundun / Tejas Savoo; Aimen Daoud / Yacine Laichi				not played
5	(Mauritius) (Algeria)	Lucas Douce / Elsa How Hong; Ryane Mazri / Ines Madi				not played

==== Final ====
Mauritius
3
Stade Lat-Dior, Court 1
14 August 2024, 10:00 UTC+0

Egypt
1

			1	2	3
1	(Mauritius) (Egypt)	Agnivesh Ragoonundun / Aidan Yu Kiat; Ziad Hesham / Seif Omar	18; 21	12; 21
2	(Mauritius) (Egypt)	Lucas Douce; Seif Omar	21; 15	22; 20
3	(Mauritius) (Egypt)	Tiya Bhurtun; Reem Hussein	21; 15	21; 14
4	(Mauritius) (Egypt)	Chiara How Hong / Elsa How Hong; Hadia Elgendy / Reem Hussein	18; 21	21; 13	21; 18
5	(Mauritius) (Egypt)	Lucas Douce / Elsa How Hong; Ziad Hesham / Hadia Elgendy				not played

=== Final ranking ===
Pos	Team	Pld	W	L	Pts	MD	GD	PD	Final result
1st place, gold medalist(s)	Mauritius	5	5	0	5	+18	+34	+404	Champions
2nd place, silver medalist(s)	Egypt	5	4	1	4	+14	+25	+344	Runners-up
3rd place, bronze medalist(s)	Algeria	4	3	1	3	+4	+9	+155	Eliminated in semi-finals
3rd place, bronze medalist(s)	South Africa	4	3	1	3	+3	+10	+149	Eliminated in semi-finals
5	Tunisia	3	1	2	1	−5	−10	−90	Eliminated in group stage
6	Benin	3	1	2	1	−5	−11	−187	Eliminated in group stage
7	Senegal	3	1	2	0	−15	−29	−369	Eliminated in group stage
8	Burundi	3	1	2	0	−15	−30	−448	Eliminated in group stage

== Individual event ==
=== Boys' singles ===
Semifinals
1	(Mauritius) Lucas Douce	21	21
(Egypt) Ziad Hesham	14	7
6	(Algeria) Aimen Daoud	11	21	24
2	(Mauritius) Aidan Yu Kiat	21	16	26

Final
6	(Mauritius) Lucas Douce	21	21
2	(Mauritius) Aidan Yu Kiat	15	8

=== Girls' singles ===
Semifinals
1	(Egypt) Reem Hussein	21	21
6	(Egypt) Lojain Wasfy	16	11
3	(Mauritius) Chiara How Hong	21	13	13
2	(Egypt) Hadia Elgendy	17	21	21

Final
1	(Egypt) Reem Hussein	15	21	21
5	(Egypt) Hadia Elgendy	21	9	15

=== Boys' doubles ===
Semifinals
1	(Mauritius) Lucas Douce (Mauritius) Aidan Yu Kiat	30	21
4	(Algeria) Aimen Daoud (Algeria) Yacine Laichi	29	17
3	(Ghana) Leslie Nii Adote Addo (Ghana) Jonathan Ankrah	18	12
(Algeria) Ayoub Rayan Daoud (Algeria) Oussama Keddou	21	21

Final
1	(Mauritius) Lucas Douce (Mauritius) Aidan Yu Kiat	21	21
(Algeria) Ayoub Rayan Daoud (Algeria) Oussama Keddou	12	17

=== Girls' doubles ===
Semifinals
1	(Mauritius) Tiya Bhurtun (Mauritius) Layna Luxmi Chiniah	16	11
4	(Egypt) Hadia Elgendy (Egypt) Reem Hussein	21	21
3	(Egypt) Fatema Rabie (Egypt) Lojain Wasfy	18	17
2	(Mauritius) Chiara How Hong (Mauritius) Elsa How Hong	21	21

Final
4	(Egypt) Hadia Elgendy (Egypt) Reem Hussein	14	16
2	(Mauritius) Chiara How Hong (Mauritius) Elsa How Hong	21	21

=== Mixed doubles ===
Semifinals
1	(Mauritius) Aidan Yu Kiat (Mauritius) Chiara How Hong	16	7
(Mauritius) Lucas Douce (Mauritius) Elsa How Hong	21	21
(Egypt) Mahmoud Mohamed Mahmoud (Egypt) Fatema Rabie	16	21	21
2	(Egypt) Ziad Hesham (Egypt) Hadia Elgendy	21	12	15

Final
(Mauritius) Lucas Douce (Mauritius) Elsa How Hong	21	21
2	(Egypt) Mahmoud Mohamed Mahmoud (Egypt) Fatema Rabie	18	16
