= Mahmoud El Sayad =

Egyptian badminton player (born 1993)

Personal information
- Born: Mahmoud Sayed Abdelsalam El Sayad; 12 April 1993 (age 33)

Sport
- Country: Egypt
- Sport: Badminton

Men's
- Highest ranking: 229 (MS) 4 Aug 2011; 195 (MD) 5 Sep 2013; 103 (XD) 12 Sep 2013
- BWF profile
Medal record
Badminton
Representing Egypt
African Championships
Bronze medal – third place	2011 Marrakesh	Mixed team
Africa Team Championships
Bronze medal – third place	2012 Addis Ababa	Men's team

Mahmoud Sayed Abdelsalam El Sayad (born 12 April 1993) is an Egyptian male badminton player.

== Achievements ==
=== BWF International Challenge/Series ===
Men's Doubles
Year	Tournament	Partner	Opponent	Score	Result
2013	Uganda International	(Egypt) Abdelrahman Kashkal	(Italy) Giovanni Greco (Italy) Daniel Messersi	18-21, 18–21	(silver) Runner-up

Mixed Doubles
Year	Tournament	Partner	Opponent	Score	Result
2013	Uganda International	(Egypt) Nadine Ashraf	(Egypt) Abdelrahman Kashkal (Egypt) Hadia Hosny	14-21, 21–15, 21–19	(gold) Winner

BWF International Challenge tournament
BWF International Series tournament
BWF Future Series tournament
