= South Africa national badminton team =

National badminton team representing South Africa

South Africa
- Association: Badminton South Africa (BSA)
- Confederation: BCA (Africa)
- President: Gretha Prinsloo

BWF ranking
- Current ranking: 34 (2 April 2024)
- Highest ranking: 23 (5 April 2012)

Sudirman Cup
- Appearances: 9 (first in 1997)
- Best result: Group stage

Thomas Cup
- Appearances: 4 (first in 2004)
- Best result: Group stage

Uber Cup
- Appearances: 6 (first in 2004)
- Best result: Group stage

African Mixed Team Championships
- Appearances: 17 (first in 1998)
- Best result: Champions (1992, 1994, 1998, 2002, 2004, 2006, 2009, 2011, 2013, 2014)

African Men's Team Championships
- Appearances: 4 (first in 2016)
- Best result: Champions (2016)

African Women's Team Championships
- Appearances: 3 (first in 2020)
- Best result: Champions (2024)

The South African national badminton team (Afrikaans: Suid-Afrika nasionale pluimbalspan; Sotho: Sehlopha sa naha sa badminton sa Afrika Borwa; Xhosa: Iqela lesizwe le-badminton loMzantsi Afrika; Zulu: Iqembu lesizwe laseNingizimu Afrika i-badminton) represents South Africa in international badminton team competitions and is controlled by Badminton South Africa, the governing body for badminton in South Africa. South Africa has participated in the Thomas Cup, Uber Cup and the Sudirman Cup but have never been to the quarterfinals.

South Africa is one of the leading badminton nations in Africa, winning all three team events at the African Badminton Championships for more than four times.

== Competitive record ==
=== Thomas Cup ===
Year	Round	Pos
1949	Did not enter	
1952	Did not enter	
1955	Did not enter	
1958	Did not enter	
1961	Did not enter	
1964	Did not qualify	
1967	Did not qualify	
1970	Did not qualify	
1973	Banned due to apartheid	
1976	Banned due to apartheid	
1979	Banned due to apartheid	
1982	Banned due to apartheid	
1984	Banned due to apartheid	
1986	Banned due to apartheid	
1988	Banned due to apartheid	
1990	Banned due to apartheid	
1992	Did not qualify	
1994	Did not qualify	
1996	Did not qualify	
1998	Did not qualify	
2000	Did not qualify	
2002	Did not qualify	
2004	Round of 16	10th
2006	Round of 16	12th
2008	Did not qualify	
2010	Did not qualify	
2012	Group stage	12th
2014	Did not enter	
2016	Group stage	14th
2018	Did not enter	
2020	Did not qualify	
2022	Did not qualify	
2024	Did not qualify	
2026	Did not qualify	
2028	To be determined	
2030	To be determined	

=== Uber Cup ===
Year	Round	Pos
1957 to 1963	Did not enter	
1966	Did not qualify	
1969	Did not qualify	
1972	Banned due to apartheid	
1975	Banned due to apartheid	
1978	Banned due to apartheid	
1981	Banned due to apartheid	
1984	Banned due to apartheid	
1986	Banned due to apartheid	
1988	Banned due to apartheid	
1990	Banned due to apartheid	
1992	Did not qualify	
1994	Did not qualify	
1996	Did not qualify	
1998	Did not qualify	
2000	Did not qualify	
2002	Did not enter	
2004	Round of 16	12th
2006	Round of 16	12th
2008	Round of 16	12th
2010	Group stage	12th
2012	Group stage	12th
2014	Did not enter	
2016	Did not enter	
2018	Did not enter	
2020	Did not qualify	
2022	Did not qualify	
2024	Qualified, later withdrew	
2026	Group stage	16th
2028	To be determined	
2030	To be determined	

=== Sudirman Cup ===
Year	Round	Pos
1989	Banned due to apartheid	
1991	Banned due to apartheid	
1993	Did not enter	
1995	Did not enter	
1997	Group stage	42nd
1999	Group stage	40th
2001	Group stage	39th
2003	Group stage	34th
2005	Group stage	29th
2007	Group stage	37th
2009	Group stage	30th
2011	Group stage	25th
2013	Did not enter	
2015	Group stage	27th
2017	Did not enter	
2019	Did not enter	
2021	Did not qualify	
2023	Did not qualify	
2025	Did not qualify	
2027	To be determined	
2029	To be determined	

=== Commonwealth Games ===
==== Men's team ====
Year	Round	Pos
1998	Quarter-finals	

==== Women's team ====
Year	Round	Pos
1998	Quarter-finals	

==== Mixed team ====
Year	Round	Pos
1978 to 1990	Banned due to apartheid	
1994	Group stage	
2002	Did not enter	
2006	Group stage	
2010	Did not enter	
2014	Group stage	
2018	Group stage	
2022	Quarter-finals	
2026	To be determined	

=== African Games ===
==== Mixed team ====
Year	Round	Pos
2003	Champions	1st
2007	Runners-up	2nd
2011	Runners-up	2nd
2015	Runners-up	2nd
2019	Semi-finals	4th
2027	To be determined	

=== African Team Championships ===
==== Men's team ====
Year	Round	Pos
1979 to 1988	Banned due to apartheid	
2016	Champions	1st
2018	Did not enter	
2020	Semi-finals	4th
2022	Semi-finals	4th
2024	Group stage	5th
2026	Quarter-finals	6th
2028	To be determined	
2030	To be determined	

==== Women's team ====
Year	Round	Pos
1979 to 1988	Banned due to apartheid	
2016	Did not enter	
2018	Did not enter	
2020	Fourth place	4th
2022	Semi-finals	4th
2024	Champions	1st
2026	Champions	1st
2028	To be determined	
2030	To be determined	

==== Mixed team ====
Year	Round	Pos
1980 to 1988	Banned due to apartheid	
1992	Champions	1st
1994	Champions	1st
1998	Champions	1st
2000	Runners-up	2nd
2002	Champions	1st
2004	Champions	1st
2006	Champions	1st
2007	Runners-up	2nd
2009	Champions	1st
2011	Champions	1st
2013	Champions	1st
2014	Champions	1st
2017	Runners-up	2nd
2019	Quarter-finals	
2021	Semi-finals	3rd
2023	Semi-finals	4th
2025	Semi-finals	3rd
2027	To be determined	
2029	To be determined	

=== FISU World University Games ===
==== Mixed team ====
Year	Round	Pos
2007	Did not enter	
2011	Did not enter	
2013	Did not enter	
2015	Did not enter	
2017	Group stage	
2021	Did not enter	
2025	To be determined	

=== World University Team Championships ===
==== Mixed team ====
Year	Round	Pos
2008	Did not enter	
2010	Did not enter	
2012	Did not enter	
2014	Did not enter	
2016	Did not enter	
2018	Did not enter	

**Red border color indicates tournament was held on home soil.

== Junior competitive record ==
=== Suhandinata Cup ===
Year	Round	Pos
2000	Group stage	23rd
2002	Group stage	16th
2004	Did not enter	
2006	Group stage	27th
2007	Group stage	23rd
2008	Did not enter	
2009	Did not enter	
2010	Group stage	23rd
2011	Did not enter	
2012	Group stage	28th
2013	Group stage	24th
2014	Group stage	28th
2015	Group stage	28th
2016	Group stage	45th
2017	Group stage	31st
2018	Group stage	31st
2019	Did not enter	
2022	Did not enter	
2023	Did not enter	
2024	Did not enter	
2025	Did not enter	
2026	Group stage	32nd of 47

=== Commonwealth Youth Games ===
==== Mixed team ====
Year	Round	Pos
2004	Group stage	8th

=== African Youth Games ===
==== Men's team ====
Year	Round	Pos
2018	Did not enter	

==== Women's team ====
Year	Round	Pos
2018	Did not enter	

==== Mixed team ====
Year	Round	Pos
2014	Runners-up	2nd

=== African Junior Team Championships ===
==== Mixed team ====
Year	Round	Pos
1979	Banned due to apartheid	
1980	Banned due to apartheid	
1982	Banned due to apartheid	
1984	Banned due to apartheid	
1988	Banned due to apartheid	
1993	Champions	1st
1995	Champions	1st
1997	Champions	1st
1999	Runners-up	2nd
2001	Champions	1st
2003	Runners-up	2nd
2005	Runners-up	2nd
2007	Champions	1st
2009	Champions	1st
2011	Champions	1st
2013	Champions	1st
2016	Semi-finals	3rd
2021	Champions	1st
2022	Group stage	
2024	Semi-finals	3rd
2026	Champions	1st

**Red border color indicates tournament was held on home soil.

== Players ==
=== Current squad ===
As of 2 January 2024

==== Men's team ====
Name	DoB/Age	Ranking of event		
Name	DoB/Age	MS	MD	XD
Caden Kakora	10 July 2003 (age 23)	225	176	99
Robert White	27 July 2004 (age 22)	260	176	109
Cameron Coetzer	7 November 1995 (age 30)	1623	708	426
Ruan Snyman	2 November 1998 (age 27)	565	403	-
Jarred Elliott	26 January 2000 (age 26)	-	131	129
Robert Summers	13 May 2002 (age 24)	315	131	426

==== Women's team ====
Name	DoB/Age	Ranking of event		
Name	DoB/Age	WS	WD	XD
Johanita Scholtz	25 January 2000 (age 26)	117	457	99
Anri Schoonees	28 March 1996 (age 30)	-	457	426
Amy Ackerman	16 March 2005 (age 21)	-	68	129
Deidré Laurens	29 March 1995 (age 31)	957	68	109
Demi Botha	27 July 1995 (age 31)	-	457	426
Diane Olivier	6 April 2004 (age 22)	370	457	1160
