= Badminton Africa =

Governing body of badminton in Africa

- Abbreviation: BCA
- Formation: 31 August 1977
- Type: Sports federation
- Headquarters: Pretoria, Republic of South Africa
- Members: 46 member associations 3 associate members
- President: (Seychelles) Michel Bau
- Website: https://badmintonafrica.com/

Badminton Africa (BA) is the governing body of badminton in Africa. It is one of the 5 continental bodies under the flag of the Badminton World Federation. It now has 46 member countries and 2 associate members. It was formerly called the Badminton Confederation of Africa.

== History ==
Badminton Africa was formed on 31 August 1977 as African Badminton Federation during a meeting in Dar es Salaam, Tanzania. The meeting was attended by delegates from seven national organisations from Ghana, Kenya, Mauritius, Mozambique, Nigeria, Tanzania and Zambia. Willibard Kente was elected as a president, and Mariam Hamdan as secretary.

== Member associations ==
- Algeria
- Benin
- Botswana
- Burkina Faso
- Burundi
- Cameroon
- Central African Republic
- Chad (associate member)
- Comoros
- (Republic of the Congo) Congo
- Djibouti
- (Democratic Republic of the Congo) DR Congo
- Egypt
- Equatorial Guinea
- Eritrea
- Eswatini
- Ethiopia
- (The Gambia) Gambia
- Ghana
- Guinea
- Ivory Coast
- Kenya
- Lesotho
- Libya
- Madagascar
- Malawi
- Mauritania
- Mauritius
- Mayotte (associate member)
- Morocco
- Mozambique
- Namibia
- Niger
- Nigeria
- Rwanda
- (Réunion) Reunion (associate member)
- (Saint Helena, Ascension and Tristan da Cunha) Saint Helena
- Senegal
- Seychelles
- Sierra Leone
- Somalia
- South Africa
- Sudan
- Tanzania
- Togo
- Tunisia
- Uganda
- Zambia
- Zimbabwe

== Presidents ==
No.	Years	Name
1	1977–1980	(Tanzania) Willibard Kente
2	1980–1982 (interim)	(Sri Lanka) Ramachandra Balasuperamaniam
3	1982–2005	(Nigeria) Dapo Tejuoso
4	2005–2010	(South Africa) Larry Keys
5	2010 (interim)	(Nigeria) Kabir Badamasuiy
6	2011–2013	(Ethiopia) Dagmawit Girmay Berhane
7	2013–2017	(South Africa) Larry Keys
8	2017–2018	(Nigeria) Danlami Senchi
9	2018 (interim)	(Algeria) Amine Zoubiri
10	2018–now	(Seychelles) Michel Bau

== Tournaments ==
- African Badminton Championships
- All Africa Men's and Women's Team Badminton Championships
- African Junior Badminton Championships
