= 2020 Thomas Cup qualification =

Tournament details
- Dates: February 10, 2020 – February 16, 2020
- Venue: BA: Rizal Memorial Coliseum; BCA: Cairo Stadium Indoor Halls Complex; BE: Stade Couvert Régional; BO: Ken Kay Badminton Stadium; BPA: Centro Pan-Americano de Judô
- Location: BA: Manila, Philippines; BCA: Cairo, Egypt; BE: Liévin, France; BO: Ballarat, Australia; BPA: Salvador, Bahia, Brazil

The 2020 Thomas Cup qualification process is a series of tournaments organised by the five BWF confederations to decide 14 of the 16 teams which will play in the 2020 Thomas Cup, with Denmark qualifying automatically as hosts, and China qualifying automatically as trophy holder.

== Qualified teams ==
Country	Confederation	Qualified as	Qualified on	World Team Rankings	Final appearance
Denmark	Badminton Europe	Host country	29 November 2018	4th	31st
China	Badminton Asia	2018 Thomas Cup winners	27 May 2018	3rd	20th
Algeria	Badminton Africa	2020 All Africa Team Championships winners	13 February 2020	36th	2nd
India	Badminton Asia	2020 Asia Team Championships semifinalists	14 February 2020	6th	12th
Indonesia	Badminton Asia	2020 Asia Team Championships winners	14 February 2020	1st	28th
Japan	Badminton Asia	2020 Asia Team Championships semifinalists	14 February 2020	2nd	16th
Malaysia	Badminton Asia	2020 Asia Team Championships runners up	14 February 2020	7th	28th
France	Badminton Europe	2020 European Team Championships semifinalists	14 February 2020	14th	4th
Netherlands	Badminton Europe	2020 European Team Championships runners up	14 February 2020	16th	2nd
Tahiti	Badminton Oceania	2020 Oceania Team Championships semifinalists^{3}	18 February 2020	107th	Debut
Canada	Badminton Pan Am	2020 Pan Am Team Championships winners	16 February 2020	12th	6th
England	Badminton Europe	Best ranking (Europe)^{1}	18 February 2020	11th	15th
Germany	Badminton Europe	Best ranking (Europe)^{2}	18 February 2020	13th	10th
Chinese Taipei	Badminton Asia	Best ranking (overall)	18 February 2020	5th	4th
South Korea	Badminton Asia	Best ranking (overall)	18 February 2020	8th	19th
Thailand	Badminton Asia	Best ranking (overall)	18 February 2020	9th	14th
Withdrew
Russia	Badminton Europe	2020 European Team Championships semifinalists	14 February 2020	15th	—N/a
Australia	Badminton Oceania	2020 Oceania Team Championships winners	15 February 2020	32nd	—N/a

- ^1 Since Denmark, one of the semifinalists for European qualification tournament had already qualified as the host, hence the spot is given to the best European team from World Team Ranking.
- ^2 Russia withdrew and replaced by Germany as the next highest ranked team for Europe
- ^3 Australia as winner of the BO 2020 championships withdrew and replaced by Tahiti as semifinalists of the BO 2020 championships because New Zealand as runners up of the BO 2020 championships declined the offer

== Qualification process ==
The number of teams participating in the final tournament is 16. The allocation of slots for each confederation is the same allocation from 2016 tournament; 4 from each Asia and Europe, and 1 from each Africa, Oceania and Pan Am. Two automatic qualifiers are the host and defending champion. The remaining quota will be filled by World Team Ranking.

== Confederation qualification ==
=== Badminton Confederation of Africa ===
The qualification for the African teams was held from 10 to 13 February 2020, at the Cairo Stadium Indoor Halls Complex in Cairo, Egypt. The winners of the African qualification will qualified for the Thomas Cup.

==== Teams in contention ====
Teams qualified for the Group stage

- Algeria
- Cameroon
- Egypt
- Mauritius
- Morocco
- Sierra Leone
- South Africa
- Tunisia
- Uganda

==== First round (group stage) ====
Advance to Knockout stage

Group A

Pos	Team	Pld	Pts
1	Algeria	3	3
2	Mauritius	3	2
3	Uganda	3	1
4	Tunisia	3	0

Source: TS
Group B

Pos	Team	Pld	Pts
1	Egypt	4	4
2	South Africa	4	3
3	Morocco	4	2
4	Cameroon	4	1
5	Sierra Leone	0	0

Source: TS

==== Second round (knockout stage) ====
Semi-finals
12 February
Algeria	3
South Africa	0
12 February
Mauritius	3
Egypt	0

Final
13 February
Algeria	3
Mauritius	2

=== Badminton Asia ===
The qualification for the Asian teams will held from 11 to 16 February 2020, at the Srizal Memorial Coliseum in Manila, Philippines. The semifinalist of the Asian qualification will qualified for the Thomas Cup. China qualified automatically as trophy holder.

==== Teams in contention ====
Teams qualified for the Group stage

- Chinese Taipei
- India
- Indonesia
- Japan
- Kazakhstan
- Malaysia
- Philippines
- Singapore
- Thailand
- South Korea

==== First round (group stage) ====
Advance to Knockout stage

Group A
Group B

Pos	Team	Pld	Pts
1	Indonesia	1	1
2	South Korea	1	0

Source: TS

Pos	Team	Pld	Pts
1	Malaysia	2	2
2	India	2	1
3	Kazakhstan	2	0

Source: TS
Group C
Group D

Pos	Team	Pld	Pts
1	Chinese Taipei	2	2
2	Philippines (H)	2	1
3	Singapore	2	0

Source: TS
(H) Host

Pos	Team	Pld	Pts
1	Thailand	1	1
2	Japan	1	0

Source: TS

==== Second round (knockout stage) ====
Quarter-finals
14 February 16:10
Indonesia (1)	3
Philippines	0
14 February 16:10
Thailand (8)	2
India (5)	3
14 February 16:00
South Korea (7)	0
Malaysia (6)	3
14 February 16:10
Japan (2)	3
Chinese Taipei (3)	1

Semi-finals
15 February 16:00
Indonesia (1)	3
India (5)	2
15 February 16:00
Malaysia (6)	3
Japan (2)	0

Final
16 February 16:00
Indonesia (1)	3
Malaysia (6)	1

=== Badminton Europe ===
The qualification for the European teams will held from 11 to 16 February 2020, at the Stade Couvert Régional in Liévin, France. The semi-finalist of the European qualification will qualified for the Thomas Cup. Denmark qualified automatically as hosts.

==== Teams in contention ====
Teams qualified for the Group stage

- Austria
- Azerbaijan
- Belgium
- Bulgaria
- Croatia
- Czech Republic
- Denmark (qualified)
- England
- Estonia
- Finland
- France
- Germany
- Greenland
- Hungary
- Iceland
- Ireland
- Israel
- Italy
- Latvia
- Lithuania
- Luxembourg
- Netherlands
- Norway
- Poland
- Portugal
- Russia
- Slovakia
- Slovenia
- Sweden
- Switzerland
- Spain
- Turkey
- Ukraine
- Wales

==== First round (group stage) ====
Advance to Knockout stage

Group 1
Group 2
Group 3

Pos	Team	Pld	Pts
1	Denmark	3	3
2	Switzerland	3	2
3	Wales	3	1
4	Latvia	3	0

Source: TS

Pos	Team	Pld	Pts
1	England	3	3
2	Sweden	3	2
3	Estonia	3	1
4	Greenland	3	0

Source: TS

Pos	Team	Pld	Pts
1	France (H)	3	3
2	Belgium	3	2
3	Turkey	3	1
4	Hungary	3	0

Source: TS
(H) Host
Group 4
Group 5
Group 6

Pos	Team	Pld	Pts
1	Russia	3	3
2	Austria	3	2
3	Ireland	3	1
4	Poland	3	0

Source: TS

Pos	Team	Pld	Pts
1	Germany	3	3
2	Czech Republic	3	2
3	Iceland	3	1
4	Azerbaijan	3	0

Source: TS

Pos	Team	Pld	Pts
1	Netherlands	3	3
2	Slovakia	3	2
3	Lithuania	3	1
4	Luxembourg	3	0

Source: TS
Group 7
Group 8

Pos	Team	Pld	Pts
1	Ukraine	4	4
2	Finland	4	3
3	Norway	4	2
4	Slovenia	4	1
5	Portugal	4	0

Source: TS

Pos	Team	Pld	Pts
1	Bulgaria	4	3
2	Spain	4	3
3	Italy	4	2
4	Croatia	4	2
5	Israel	4	0

Source: TS

==== Second round (knockout stage) ====
Quarter-finals
14 February 2020
Denmark	3
Germany	0
14 February 2020
Russia	3
Bulgaria	1
14 February 2020
Ukraine	0
France	3
14 February 2020
Netherlands	3
England	2

Semi-finals
15 February 2020
Denmark	3
Russia	0
15 February 2020
France	2
Netherlands	3

Final
16 February 2020
Denmark	3
Netherlands	0

=== Badminton Oceania ===
The qualification for the Oceanian teams will hold from 13 to 15 February 2020, at the Ken Kay Badminton Stadium in Ballarat, Australia. The winner of the Oceania qualification qualified for the Thomas Cup.

==== Teams in contention ====
- Australia
- Fiji
- New Caledonia
- New Zealand
- Tahiti

==== Round-robin ====
Pos	Team	Pld	W	L	MF	MA	MD	GF	GA	GD	PF	PA	PD	Pts	Qualification
1	Australia	4	4	0	18	2	+16	36	5	+31	844	468	+376	4	Thomas Cup
2	New Zealand	4	3	1	17	3	+14	35	6	+29	845	499	+346	3	
3	Tahiti	4	2	2	10	10	0	20	22	−2	643	716	−73	2	
4	New Caledonia	4	1	3	4	16	−12	10	34	−24	609	862	−253	1	
5	Fiji	4	0	4	1	19	−18	4	38	−34	474	870	−396	0	

Source: TS

=== Badminton Pan Am ===
The qualification for the Pan Am teams will hold from 13 to 16 February 2020, at the Centro Pan-Americano de Judô in Salvador, Bahia, Brazil. The winner of the Pan Am qualification will qualified for the Thomas Cup.

==== Teams in contention ====
Teams qualified for the Group stage

- Brazil
- Canada
- Guatemala
- Mexico
- Peru
- United States

==== First round (group stage) ====
Advance to Knockout stage

Group A

Pos	Team	Pld	Pts
1	Canada	2	2
2	Mexico	2	1
3	Brazil	2	0

Source: TS
Group B

Pos	Team	Pld	Pts
1	United States	2	2
2	Guatemala	2	1
3	Peru	2	0

Source: TS

==== Second round (knockout stage) ====
Semi-finals
15 February
Canada	3
Guatemala	1
15 February
Mexico	3
United States	1

Final
16 February
Canada	3
Mexico	1
Third place
15 February
Guatemala	0
United States	3

== World team rankings ==
=== Summary of qualification ===
Below is the chart of the BWF World Team Ranking calculated by adding World Ranking points of top three Men's Singles players and top two Men's Doubles pairs on 18 February 2020.

Rank	Conf.	Nation	Points	Continental results	Qualification status
1	BA	Indonesia	406,902	Winner	Qualified as the winner of BA
2	BA	Japan	377,562	Semifinals	Qualified as BA semifinalists
3	BA	China	329,458	Trophy Holder	Qualified as trophy holder
4	BE	Denmark	304,472	Winner	Qualified as host country
5	BA	Chinese Taipei	276,250	Quarterfinals	Qualified by ranking (overall)
6	BA	India	250,525	Semifinals	Qualified as BA semifinalists
7	BA	Malaysia	231,964	Runner-up	Qualified as BA runners up
8	BA	South Korea	197,987	Quarterfinals	Qualified by ranking (overall)
9	BA	Thailand	184,221	Quarterfinals	Qualified by ranking (overall)
10	BA	Hong Kong	182,876		
11	BE	England	141,712	Quarterfinals	Qualified by ranking (Europe)
12	BPA	Canada	133,060	Winner	Qualified as the winner of BPA
13	BE	Germany	129,507	Quarterfinals	Qualified by ranking (Europe)
14	BE	France	123,440	Semifinals	Qualified as BE semifinalists
15	BE	Russia	116,127	Semifinals	Qualified as BE semifinalists, Withdrew
16	BE	Netherlands	112,980	Runner-up	Qualified as BE runners up
17	BPA	United States	83,420	3rd place	
18	BA	Singapore	72,422	Group stage	
19	BPA	Mexico	70,239	Runner-up	
20	BPA	Brazil	69,458	5th place	
21	BE	Finland	68,376	Group stage	
22	BPA	Guatemala	65,289	4th place	
23	BCA	Nigeria	64,606		
24	BE	Spain	64,028	Group stage	
25	BA	Vietnam	60,757		
26	BE	Ukraine	58,397	Quarterfinals	
27	BE	Ireland	57,907	Group stage	
28	BCA	Egypt	56,912	Semifinals	
29	BE	Czech Republic	54,401	Group stage	
30	BE	Austria	54,084	Group stage	
31	BE	Sweden	53,299	Group stage	
32	BO	Australia	51,535	Winner	Qualified as the winner of BO, Withdrew
33	BE	Scotland	50,210		
34	BE	Poland	49,978	Group stage	
35	BCA	Mauritius	49,502	Runner-up	
36	BCA	Algeria	48,331	Winner	Qualified as the winner of BCA
37	BO	New Zealand	47,471	Runner-up	Qualified as the runners up of BO, declined the offer
38	BE	Bulgaria	45,423	Quarterfinals	
39	BPA	Cuba	45,350		
40	BE	Israel	43,456	Group stage	
41	BE	Azerbaijan	42,519	Group stage	
42	BE	Italy	38,687	Group stage	
43	BPA	Peru	38,392	6th place	
44	BE	Switzerland	38,375	Group stage	
45	BE	Belgium	38,066	Group stage	
46	BA	Sri Lanka	34,821		
47	BE	Turkey	34,017	Group stage	
48	BE	Estonia	31,386	Group stage	
49	BE	Norway	27,340	Group stage	
50	BPA	Jamaica	26,240		
50+ participants
51	BE	Portugal	24,624	Group stage	
52	BCA	South Africa	24,225	Semifinals	
54	BE	Hungary	23,079	Group stage	
56	BA	Philippines	22,026	Quarterfinals	
57	BE	Iceland	21,312	Group stage	
59	BE	Slovenia	20,405	Group stage	
60	BE	Croatia	19,820	Group stage	
61	BA	Kazakhstan	18,770	Group stage	
64	BE	Slovakia	16,080	Group stage	
67	BCA	Uganda	15,326	Group stage	
73	BE	Luxembourg	11,714	Group stage	
80	BCA	Cameroon	7,970	Group stage	
81	BCA	Morocco	7,681	Group stage	
84	BE	Wales	7,010	Group stage	
92	BCA	Tunisia	6,280	Group stage	
96	BO	New Caledonia	5,145	4th place	
106	BE	Greenland	3,290	Group stage	
107	BO	Tahiti	3,129	3rd place	Qualified as BO semifinalists
110	BO	Fiji	3,020	5th place	
112	BE	Lithuania	2,975	Group stage	
124	BE	Latvia	1,148	Group stage	
