= Tunisia national badminton team =

National badminton team representing Tunisia

Tunisia
- Nickname(s): نسور قرطاج (Eagles of Carthage)
- Association: Tunisian Badminton Federation (FTBAD)
- Confederation: BCA (Africa)
- President: Maher Attar

BWF ranking
- Current ranking: Unranked (2 April 2024)
- Highest ranking: 99 (5 July 2018)

African Men's Team Championships
- Appearances: 2 (first in 2018)
- Best result: Group stage

The Tunisia national badminton team (Arabic: منتخب تونس لكرة الريشة) represents Tunisia in international team competitions. The Tunisian national team is managed by the Tunisian Badminton Federation (Arabic: الجامعة التونسية للريشة الطائرة; FTBAD). The men's team debuted in the African Badminton Championships in 2018.

The Tunisian mixed team debuted in the 2019 African Games. The team were eliminated in the group stages.

== History ==
Badminton in Tunisia started in the early 2000s. The Tunisian national badminton team was formed shortly after the formation of the Tunisian Badminton Federation in 2009. The national team competed in their first international team tournament when the men's team debuted at the 2018 All Africa Men's and Women's Team Badminton Championships.

Around this time, the Tunisian Badminton Federation partnered with the Badminton World Federation and organized Shuttle Time programs in the country to promote the sport. Former Bahraini national player was selected to coach the Tunisian team alongside former Egyptian player Ahmed Reda.

=== Men's team ===
The Tunisian men's team competed in the 2018 All Africa Men's Team Badminton Championships. They were grouped with Mauritius and Cameroon in Group A. The team failed to advance to the quarter-finals after losing 5–0 against Cameroon. The team competed in the African Men's Team Championships for a second time in 2020. The team were eliminated in the group stage after losing 5–0 against Uganda, Mauritius and Algeria in their group.

=== Mixed team ===
The Tunisian mixed team first competed in the 2019 African Games. The team were grouped with Nigeria, Zambia and Ethiopia. The team were eliminated in the group stage after losing all of their matches to their opponents in their group.

== Competitive record ==
=== Thomas Cup ===
Year	Round	Pos
1949 to 1955	Part of France	
1958 to 2016	Did not enter	
2018	Did not qualify	
2020	Did not qualify	
2022	Did not enter	
2024	Did not enter	
2026	To be determined	
2028	To be determined	
2030	To be determined	

=== Uber Cup ===
Year	Round	Pos
1957 to 2024	Did not enter	
2026	To be determined	
2028	To be determined	
2030	To be determined	

=== Sudirman Cup ===
Year	Round	Pos
1989 to 2023	Did not enter	
2025	To be determined	
2027	To be determined	
2029	To be determined	

=== African Games ===
==== Mixed team ====
Year	Round	Pos
2003	Did not enter	
2007	Did not enter	
2011	Did not enter	
2015	Did not enter	
2019	Group stage	
2027	To be determined	

=== African Team Championships ===
==== Men's team ====
Year	Round	Pos
1979 to 2016	Did not enter	
2018	Group stage	
2020	Group stage	
2022	Did not enter	
2024	Did not enter	
2026	To be determined	
2028	To be determined	
2030	To be determined	

==== Women's team ====
Year	Round	Pos
1979 to 2024	Did not enter	
2026	To be determined	
2028	To be determined	
2030	To be determined	

==== Mixed team ====
Year	Round	Pos
1980 to 2023	Did not enter	
2025	To be determined	
2027	To be determined	
2029	To be determined	

=== Arab Games ===
==== Men's team ====
Year	Round	Pos
1999	Did not enter	
2004	Did not enter	
2007	Did not enter	

==== Women's team ====
Year	Round	Pos
1999	Did not enter	
2004	Did not enter	
2007	Did not enter	

=== Arab Team Championships ===
==== Men's team ====
Year	Round	Pos
1996	Did not enter	
1998	Did not enter	
2000	Did not enter	
2002	Did not enter	
2004	Did not enter	
2009	Did not enter	
2011	Did not enter	
2017	Fifth place	5th

==== Women's team ====
Year	Round	Pos
1996	Did not enter	
1998	Did not enter	
2000	Did not enter	
2002	Did not enter	
2004	Did not enter	
2009	Did not enter	
2011	Did not enter	
2017	Runners-up	2nd

**Red border color indicates tournament was held on home soil.

== Junior competitive record ==
=== Suhandinata Cup ===
Year	Round	Pos
2000 to 2024	Did not enter	
2025	To be determined	

=== African Youth Games ===
==== Men's team ====
Year	Round	Pos
2018	Did not enter	

==== Women's team ====
Year	Round	Pos
2018	Did not enter	

==== Mixed team ====
Year	Round	Pos
2014	Did not enter	

=== African Junior Team Championships ===
==== Mixed team ====
Year	Round	Pos
1979 to 2022	Did not enter	
2024	Group stage	
2026	Group stage	

=== Arab Junior Team Championships ===
==== Men's team ====
Year	Round	Pos
2003	Did not enter	
2005	Did not enter	
2007	Did not enter	
2009	Did not enter	
2016	Did not enter	

==== Women's team ====
Year	Round	Pos
2003	Did not enter	
2005	Did not enter	
2007	Did not enter	
2009	Did not enter	
2016	Did not enter	

**Red border color indicates tournament was held on home soil.

== Staff ==
The following list shows the coaching staff for the national badminton team of Tunisia.

Name	Role
(Bahrain) Jaffer Ebrahim	Coach
(Egypt) Ahmed Reda	Coach

== Players ==
=== Current squad ===
As of 2 January 2024

==== Men's team ====
Name	DoB/Age	Ranking of event		
Name	DoB/Age	MS	MD	XD
Ouzaier Khayati	20 May 2003 (age 23)	–	–	–
Elmootez Belleh Rabah	25 January 2004 (age 22)	–	–	–
Mouin Rahali	9 October 2003 (age 22)	–	–	–

==== Women's team ====
Name	DoB/Age	Ranking of event		
Name	DoB/Age	WS	WD	XD
Wiem Ben Ahmed	8 January 1996 (age 30)	–	–	–
Fatma Hachani	12 June 2003 (age 23)	–	–	–
Sarra Hamroun	11 July 2002 (age 24)	–	–	–

=== Previous squads ===
==== African Games ====
- Mixed team: 2019

==== African Team Championships ====
- Men's team: 2018, 2020
