= Lesotho national badminton team =

National badminton team representing Lesotho

Lesotho
- Association: Lesotho Badminton Association (LBA)
- Confederation: BCA (Africa)
- President: Mahlape Khetsi

BWF ranking
- Current ranking: Unranked (2 April 2024)
- Highest ranking: 87 (4 July 2023)

African Mixed Team Championships
- Appearances: 1 (first in 2023)
- Best result: Group stage

The Lesotho national badminton team (Sotho: Sehlopha papadi badminton sa naha sa Lesotho) represents Lesotho in international team competitions and is controlled by the Lesotho Badminton Association, the governing body for Lesotho badminton.

The national team debuted in the African Badminton Championships in 2023.

== History ==
The Lesotho badminton team was formed after the establishment of the Lesotho Badminton Association in 1999 under the Lesotho Sports & Recreation Commission development program. The national team later became affiliated to the Badminton World Federation in 2018 and were part of the BWF Shuttle Time program which was aimed to develop and progress badminton in the country.

=== Mixed team ===
In 1984, Lesotho originally planned to debut in the 1984 African Badminton Championships but later declined their participation.

The national team made their first international team event appearance at the 2023 African Badminton Championships. The team sent a total of 4 players and were eliminated in the group stages.

== Competitive record ==
=== Thomas Cup ===
Year	Round	Pos
1949 to 1964	Part of the United Kingdom	
1967 to 2024	Did not enter	
2026	Did not qualify	
2028	To be determined	
2030	To be determined	

=== Uber Cup ===
Year	Round	Pos
1957 to 1966	Part of the United Kingdom	
1969 to 2024	Did not enter	
2026	Did not qualify	
2028	To be determined	
2030	To be determined	

=== Sudirman Cup ===
Year	Round	Pos
1989 to 2021	Did not enter	
2023	Did not qualify	
2025	To be determined	
2027	To be determined	
2029	To be determined	

=== Commonwealth Games ===
==== Men's team ====
Year	Round	Pos
1998	Did not enter	

==== Women's team ====
Year	Round	Pos
1998	Did not enter	

==== Mixed team ====
Year	Round	Pos
1978 to 2022	Did not enter	
2026	To be determined	

=== African Games ===
==== Mixed team ====
Year	Round	Pos
2003	Did not enter	
2007	Did not enter	
2011	Did not enter	
2015	Did not enter	
2019	Did not enter	
2027	To be determined	

=== African Team Championships ===
==== Men's team ====
Year	Round	Pos
1979 to 2024	Did not enter	
2026	Group stage	13th
2028	To be determined	
2030	To be determined	

==== Women's team ====
Year	Round	Pos
1979 to 2026	Did not enter	
2026	Group stage	10th
2028	To be determined	
2030	To be determined	

==== Mixed team ====
Year	Round	Pos
1980 to 2021	Did not enter	
2023	Group stage	13th
2025	To be determined	
2027	To be determined	
2029	To be determined	

**Red border color indicates tournament was held on home soil.

== Junior competitive record ==
=== Suhandinata Cup ===
Year	Round	Pos
2000 to 2024	Did not enter	
2025	To be determined	

=== African Youth Games ===
==== Men's team ====
Year	Round	Pos
2018	Did not enter	

==== Women's team ====
Year	Round	Pos
2018	Did not enter	

==== Mixed team ====
Year	Round	Pos
2014	Did not enter	

=== African Junior Team Championships ===
==== Mixed team ====
Year	Round	Pos
1979 to 2022	Did not enter	
2024	To be determined	

**Red border color indicates tournament was held on home soil.

== Players ==
=== Current squad ===
As of 2 January 2024

==== Men's team ====
Name	DoB/Age	Ranking of event		
Name	DoB/Age	MS	MD	XD
Neo Rahlolo	14 December 2002 (age 23)	1039	711	737
Tebello Selemela	5 February 2002 (age 24)	1054	711	737

==== Women's team ====
Name	DoB/Age	Ranking of event		
Name	DoB/Age	WS	WD	XD
Khahliso Khetheng	14 March 2005 (age 20)	580	448	737
Refiloe Moeletsi	26 February 1998 (age 27)	580	448	737
