= 2020 Badminton Asia Team Championships – Men's team event =

Men's team at the 2020 Badminton Asia Team Championships
- Venue: Rizal Memorial Coliseum
- Location: Manila, Philippines
- Dates: 11–16 February 2020
- Nations: 10

Medalists
gold medal	Indonesia
silver medal	Malaysia
bronze medal	India
bronze medal	Japan

The men's team event at the 2020 Badminton Asia Team Championships took place from 11 to 16 February at the Rizal Memorial Coliseum in Manila, Philippines. Indonesia were the defending champions.

== Seeds ==
The seeds were announced on 21 January 2020 based on the BWF World Team Rankings.

1. Indonesia (champions)
2. Japan (semi-finals)
3. China (withdrew)
4. Chinese Taipei (quarter-finals)
5. India (semi-finals)
6. Malaysia (final)
7. South Korea (quarter-finals)
8. Thailand (quarter-finals)

== Group stage ==
The draw was held on 29 January 2020. The men's team group stages consist of 4 groups: A, B, C and D.

Group A	Group B	Group C	Group D
Indonesia (1); South Korea (7)	India (5); Malaysia (6); Kazakhstan	Chinese Taipei (3); Singapore; Philippines	Japan (2); Thailand (8)

All times are Philippines Standard Time (UTC+08:00).

=== Group A ===
Pos	Team	Pld	W	L	MF	MA	MD	GF	GA	GD	PF	PA	PD	Pts	Qualification
1	Indonesia	1	1	0	4	1	+3	8	4	+4	246	209	+37	1	Knockout stage
2	South Korea	1	0	1	1	4	−3	4	8	−4	209	246	−37	0	Knockout stage

Source: TS

==== Indonesia vs South Korea ====
Indonesia
4
Rizal Memorial Coliseum, Court 1
12 February 2020, 16:00

South Korea
1

			1	2	3
1	(Indonesia) (South Korea)	Anthony Sinisuka Ginting; Heo Kwang-hee	24; 22	19; 21	21; 16
2	(Indonesia) (South Korea)	Marcus Fernaldi Gideon / Kevin Sanjaya Sukamuljo; Choi Sol-gyu / Kim Won-ho	21; 14	21; 16
3	(Indonesia) (South Korea)	Jonatan Christie; Son Wan-ho	16; 21	25; 27
4	(Indonesia) (South Korea)	Fajar Alfian / Muhammad Rian Ardianto; Na Sung-seung / Wang Chan	21; 10	21; 14
5	(Indonesia) (South Korea)	Shesar Hiren Rhustavito; Kim Dong-hoon	15; 21	21; 13	21; 14

=== Group B ===
Pos	Team	Pld	W	L	MF	MA	MD	GF	GA	GD	PF	PA	PD	Pts	Qualification
1	Malaysia	2	2	0	9	1	+8	19	2	+17	434	280	+154	2	Knockout stage
2	India	2	1	1	5	5	0	11	11	0	399	360	+39	1	Knockout stage
3	Kazakhstan	2	0	2	1	9	−8	2	19	−17	241	434	−193	0	

Source: TS

==== India vs Kazakhstan ====
India
4
Rizal Memorial Coliseum, Court 2
11 February 2020, 10:00

Kazakhstan
1

			1	2	3
1	(India) (Kazakhstan)	Srikanth Kidambi; Dmitriy Panarin	21; 10	21; 7
2	(India) (Kazakhstan)	Lakshya Sen; Artur Niyazov	21; 13	21; 8
3	(India) (Kazakhstan)	Subhankar Dey; Khaitmurat Kulmatov	21; 11	21; 5
4	(India) (Kazakhstan)	Prannoy Kumar / Chirag Shetty; Artur Niyazov / Dmitriy Panarin	21; 18	16; 21	19; 21
5	(India) (Kazakhstan)	Arjun M.R. / Dhruv Kapila; Nikita Bragin / Khaitmurat Kulmatov	21; 14	21; 8

==== Malaysia vs Kazakhstan ====
Malaysia
5
Rizal Memorial Coliseum, Court 2
12 February 2020, 10:00

Kazakhstan
0

			1	2	3
1	(Malaysia) (Kazakhstan)	Lee Zii Jia; Dmitriy Panarin	21; 6	21; 12
2	(Malaysia) (Kazakhstan)	Cheam June Wei; Artur Niyazov	21; 15	21; 11
3	(Malaysia) (Kazakhstan)	Leong Jun Hao; Khaitmurat Kulmatov	21; 13	21; 13
4	(Malaysia) (Kazakhstan)	Aaron Chia / Soh Wooi Yik; Artur Niyazov / Dmitriy Panarin	21; 11	21; 11
5	(Malaysia) (Kazakhstan)	Goh Sze Fei / Nur Izzuddin; Nikita Bragin / Khaitmurat Kulmatov	21; 9	21; 4

==== India vs Malaysia ====
India
1
Rizal Memorial Coliseum, Court 1
13 February 2020, 16:00

Malaysia
4

			1	2	3
1	(India) (Malaysia)	B. Sai Praneeth; Lee Zii Jia	18; 21	15; 21
2	(India) (Malaysia)	Arjun M.R. / Chirag Shetty; Aaron Chia / Soh Wooi Yik	18; 21	15; 21
3	(India) (Malaysia)	Srikanth Kidambi; Cheam June Wei	14; 21	21; 16	21; 19
4	(India) (Malaysia)	Dhruv Kapila / Lakshya Sen; Ong Yew Sin / Teo Ee Yi	14; 21	14; 21
5	(India) (Malaysia)	Prannoy Kumar; Leong Jun Hao	10; 21	15; 21

=== Group C ===
Pos	Team	Pld	W	L	MF	MA	MD	GF	GA	GD	PF	PA	PD	Pts	Qualification
1	Chinese Taipei	2	2	0	9	1	+8	18	3	+15	429	287	+142	2	Knockout stage
2	Philippines (H)	2	1	1	3	7	−4	7	14	−7	317	414	−97	1	Knockout stage
3	Singapore	2	0	2	3	7	−4	6	14	−8	337	382	−45	0	

Source: TS
(H) Host

==== Chinese Taipei vs Philippines ====
Chinese Taipei
5
Rizal Memorial Coliseum, Court 1
11 February 2020 16:00

Philippines
0

			1	2	3
1	(Chinese Taipei) (Philippines)	Chou Tien-chen; Ros Pedrosa	21; 12	21; 8
2	(Chinese Taipei) (Philippines)	Lee Yang / Wang Chi-lin; Peter Gabriel Magnaye / Alvin Morada	21; 9	21; 12
3	(Chinese Taipei) (Philippines)	Wang Tzu-wei; Lanz Ralf Zafra	21; 15	21; 12
4	(Chinese Taipei) (Philippines)	Liao Min-chun / Su Ching-heng; Philip Joper Escueta / Paul Pantig	21; 9	18; 21	21; 17
5	(Chinese Taipei) (Philippines)	Chen Shiau-cheng; Arthur Samuel Salvado	21; 7	21; 9

==== Singapore vs Philippines ====
Singapore
2
Rizal Memorial Coliseum, Court 4
12 February 2020 16:00

Philippines
3

			1	2	3
1	(Singapore) (Philippines)	Loh Kean Yew; Ros Pedrosa	21; 11	21; 8
2	(Singapore) (Philippines)	Andy Kwek / Loh Kean Hean; Peter Gabriel Magnaye / Alvin Morada	20; 22	19; 21
3	(Singapore) (Philippines)	Jason Teh; Lanz Ralf Zafra	21; 14	23; 21
4	(Singapore) (Philippines)	Abel Tan / Howin Wong; Philip Joper Escueta / Paul Pantig	16; 21	16; 21
5	(Singapore) (Philippines)	Darrion Michael Ng; Solomon Padiz jr.	10; 21	9; 21

==== Chinese Taipei vs Singapore ====
Chinese Taipei
4
Rizal Memorial Coliseum, Court 2
13 February 2020 16:00

Singapore
1

			1	2	3
1	(Chinese Taipei) (Singapore)	Chou Tien-chen; Loh Kean Yew	16; 21	17; 21
2	(Chinese Taipei) (Singapore)	Liao Min-chun / Su Ching-heng; Andy Kwek / Loh Kean Hean	21; 18	21; 15
3	(Chinese Taipei) (Singapore)	Wang Tzu-wei; Jason Teh	21; 15	21; 11
4	(Chinese Taipei) (Singapore)	Lee Yang / Wang Chi-lin; Howin Wong / Aaron Yong	21; 9	21; 7
5	(Chinese Taipei) (Singapore)	Hsueh Hsuan-yi; Lee Wei Hong	21; 18	21; 16

=== Group D ===
Pos	Team	Pld	W	L	MF	MA	MD	GF	GA	GD	PF	PA	PD	Pts	Qualification
1	Thailand	1	1	0	4	1	+3	8	4	+4	231	202	+29	1	Knockout stage
2	Japan	1	0	1	1	4	−3	4	8	−4	202	231	−29	0	Knockout stage

Source: TS

==== Japan vs Thailand ====
Japan
1
Rizal Memorial Coliseum, Court 2
12 February 2020, 16:00

Thailand
4

			1	2	3
1	(Japan) (Thailand)	Kanta Tsuneyama; Kantaphon Wangcharoen	14; 21	16; 21
2	(Japan) (Thailand)	Takuro Hoki / Yugo Kobayashi; Bodin Isara / Maneepong Jongjit	19; 21	18; 21
3	(Japan) (Thailand)	Koki Watanabe; Kunlavut Vitidsarn	21; 17	13; 21	9; 21
4	(Japan) (Thailand)	Akira Koga / Taichi Saito; Nipitphon Phuangphuapet / Tanupat Viriyangkura	21; 19	18; 21	11; 21
5	(Japan) (Thailand)	Kodai Naraoka; Khosit Phetpradab	21; 14	21; 13

== Knockout stage ==
=== Bracket ===
Quarter-finals
14 February 16:10
Indonesia (1)	3
Philippines	0
14 February 16:10
Thailand (8)	2
India (5)	3
14 February 16:00
South Korea (7)	0
Malaysia (6)	3
14 February 16:10
Japan (2)	3
Chinese Taipei (3)	1

Semi-finals
15 February 16:00
Indonesia (1)	3
India (5)	2
15 February 16:00
Malaysia (6)	3
Japan (2)	0

Final
16 February 16:00
Indonesia (1)	3
Malaysia (6)	1

=== Quarter-finals ===
==== Indonesia vs Philippines ====
Indonesia
3
Rizal Memorial Coliseum, Court 2
14 February 2020, 16:10

Philippines
0

			1	2	3
1	(Indonesia) (Philippines)	Anthony Sinisuka Ginting; Ros Pedrosa	21; 10	21; 16
2	(Indonesia) (Philippines)	Mohammad Ahsan / Hendra Setiawan; Peter Gabriel Magnaye / Alvin Morada	21; 16	21; 12
3	(Indonesia) (Philippines)	Jonatan Christie; Lanz Ralf Zafra	21; 11	21; 14
4	(Indonesia) (Philippines)	Fajar Alfian / Muhammad Rian Ardianto; Philip Joper Escueta / Paul Pantig				not played
5	(Indonesia) (Philippines)	Shesar Hiren Rhustavito; Solomon Padiz jr.				not played

==== Thailand vs India ====
Thailand
2
Rizal Memorial Coliseum, Court 3
14 February 2020, 16:10

India
3

			1	2	3
1	(Thailand) (India)	Kantaphon Wangcharoen; B. Sai Praneeth	21; 14	14; 21	21; 12
2	(Thailand) (India)	Kunlavut Vitidsarn; Srikanth Kidambi	22; 20	21; 14
3	(Thailand) (India)	Kittinupong Kedren / Tanupat Viriyangkura; Arjun M.R. / Dhruv Kapila	18; 21	20; 22
4	(Thailand) (India)	Suppanyu Avihingsanon; Lakshya Sen	19; 21	18; 21
5	(Thailand) (India)	Maneepong Jongjit / Nipitphon Phuangphuapet; Srikanth Kidambi / Chirag Shetty	15; 21	21; 16	15; 21

==== South Korea vs Malaysia ====
South Korea
0
Rizal Memorial Coliseum, Court 1
14 February 2020, 16:00

Malaysia
3

			1	2	3
1	(South Korea) (Malaysia)	Heo Kwang-hee; Lee Zii Jia	9; 21	14; 21
2	(South Korea) (Malaysia)	Choi Sol-gyu / Kim Won-ho; Aaron Chia / Soh Wooi Yik	19; 21	14; 21
3	(South Korea) (Malaysia)	Son Wan-ho; Cheam June Wei	18; 21	21; 9	14; 21
4	(South Korea) (Malaysia)	Na Sung-seung / Wang Chan; Ong Yew Sin / Teo Ee Yi				not played
5	(South Korea) (Malaysia)	Kim Dong-hoon; Leong Jun Hao				not played

==== Japan vs Chinese Taipei ====
Japan
3
Rizal Memorial Coliseum, Court 4
14 February 2020, 16:10

Chinese Taipei
1

			1	2	3
1	(Japan) (Chinese Taipei)	Kanta Tsuneyama; Chou Tien-chen	21; 12	21; 17
2	(Japan) (Chinese Taipei)	Takuro Hoki / Yugo Kobayashi; Lee Yang / Wang Chi-lin	21; 11	17; 21	19; 21
3	(Japan) (Chinese Taipei)	Kenta Nishimoto; Wang Tzu-wei	13; 21	22; 20	21; 14
4	(Japan) (Chinese Taipei)	Akira Koga / Taichi Saito; Liao Min-chun / Su Ching-heng	26; 28	21; 16	21; 13
5	(Japan) (Chinese Taipei)	Kodai Naraoka; Hsueh Hsuan-yi				not played

=== Semi-finals ===
==== Indonesia vs India ====
Indonesia
3
Rizal Memorial Coliseum, Court 1
15 February 2020, 16:00

India
2

			1	2	3
1	(Indonesia) (India)	Anthony Sinisuka Ginting; B. Sai Praneeth	21; 6			retired
2	(Indonesia) (India)	Jonatan Christie; Lakshya Sen	18; 21	20; 22
3	(Indonesia) (India)	Mohammad Ahsan / Hendra Setiawan; Arjun M.R. / Dhruv Kapila	21; 10	14; 21	23; 21
4	(Indonesia) (India)	Shesar Hiren Rhustavito; Subhankar Dey	17; 21	15; 21
5	(Indonesia) (India)	Marcus Fernaldi Gideon / Kevin Sanjaya Sukamuljo; Lakshya Sen / Chirag Shetty	21; 6	21; 13

==== Malaysia vs Japan ====
Malaysia
3
Rizal Memorial Coliseum, Court 2
15 February 2020, 16:10

Japan
0

			1	2	3
1	(Malaysia) (Japan)	Lee Zii Jia; Kanta Tsuneyama	21; 11	8; 21	21; 11
2	(Malaysia) (Japan)	Aaron Chia / Soh Wooi Yik; Takuro Hoki / Yugo Kobayashi	21; 18	21; 15
3	(Malaysia) (Japan)	Cheam June Wei; Kenta Nishimoto	21; 19	3; 21	21; 12
4	(Malaysia) (Japan)	Ong Yew Sin / Teo Ee Yi; Akira Koga / Taichi Saito				not played
5	(Malaysia) (Japan)	Leong Jun Hao; Kodai Naraoka				not played

=== Final ===
==== Indonesia vs Malaysia ====
Indonesia
3
Rizal Memorial Coliseum, Court 1
16 February 2020, 16:00

Malaysia
1

			1	2	3
1	(Indonesia) (Malaysia)	Anthony Sinisuka Ginting; Lee Zii Jia	22; 20	21; 16
2	(Indonesia) (Malaysia)	Marcus Fernaldi Gideon / Kevin Sanjaya Sukamuljo; Aaron Chia / Soh Wooi Yik	22; 20	21; 16
3	(Indonesia) (Malaysia)	Jonatan Christie; Cheam June Wei	16; 21	21; 17	22; 24
4	(Indonesia) (Malaysia)	Mohammad Ahsan / Fajar Alfian; Ong Yew Sin / Teo Ee Yi	21; 18	21; 17
5	(Indonesia) (Malaysia)	Shesar Hiren Rhustavito; Leong Jun Hao				not played

== Final ranking ==
Pos	Team	Pld	W	L	Pts	MD	GD	PD	Final result
1st place, gold medalist(s)	Indonesia	4	4	0	4	+9	+15	+131	Champions
2nd place, silver medalist(s)	Malaysia	5	4	1	4	+12	+21	+171	Runners-up
3rd place, bronze medalist(s)	India	4	3	1	3	0	+2	+9	Eliminated in semi-finals
3rd place, bronze medalist(s)	Japan	4	3	1	3	−4	−5	−9	Eliminated in semi-finals
5	Chinese Taipei	3	2	1	2	+6	+12	+113	Eliminated in quarter-finals
6	Thailand	3	1	1	1	+2	+2	+30	Eliminated in quarter-finals
7	Philippines	3	1	2	1	−7	−13	−144	Eliminated in quarter-finals
8	South Korea	3	0	2	0	−6	−9	−63	Eliminated in quarter-finals
9	Singapore	2	0	2	0	−4	−8	−45	Eliminated in group stage
10	Kazakhstan	2	0	2	0	−8	−17	−193	Eliminated in group stage
