= Cameroon national badminton team =

National badminton team representing Cameroon

Cameroon
- Association: Fédération Camerounaise de Badminton (FECABAD)
- Confederation: BCA (Africa)
- President: Odette Assembe Engoulou

BWF ranking
- Current ranking: 70 ▲2 (2 April 2024)
- Highest ranking: 63 (4 April 2023)

African Mixed Team Championships
- Appearances: 5 (first in 2006)
- Best result: Group stage

African Men's Team Championships
- Appearances: 4 (first in 2018)
- Best result: Quarter-finals (2018)

African Women's Team Championships
- Appearances: 1 (first in 2024)
- Best result: Group stage (2024)

The Cameroon national badminton team (French: Équipe nationale Camerounaise de badminton) represents Cameroon in international team competitions. It is controlled by the Cameroon Badminton Federation, the governing body for Cameroonian badminton.

Founded in the early 2000s, Cameroon made their first appearance at the African Badminton Championships when their team competed in the mixed team event in 2006. Cameroon's men's team first competed in the All Africa Men's and Women's Team Championships in 2018 while the women's team made their debut in 2024.

== History ==
=== Men's team ===
Cameroon made their maiden appearance in the African Men's Team Championships in 2018. The team were drawn into Group A with Mauritius and Tunisia. The team first won 5–0 against Tunisia then lost to Mauritius by the same margin. The team advanced to the quarter-finals after finishing second in their group. In the quarter-finals, the team lost 3–0 to Algeria.

In the 2020 All African Men's Team Championships, the team were eliminated in the group stages after losing 5–0 to Egypt, South Africa and Morocco. The team also did not advance further from the group stage in 2022 and 2024.

=== Women's team ===
Cameroon competed in the African Women's Team Championships in 2024. The team finished on the bottom of Group B after losing 5–0 to Nigeria, Mauritius and South Africa.

=== Mixed team ===
Cameroon withdrew from the 2003 All-African Games mixed team event. In 2006, the team competed in the 2006 African Badminton Championships. The team were eliminated in the group stages.

In the 2023 African Badminton Championships, the team did not advance further after losing 5–0 to Egypt and 4–1 to Zambia.

== Competitive record ==
=== Thomas Cup ===
Year	Round	Pos
1949 to 1958	Part of France	
1961 to 2016	Did not enter	
2018	Did not qualify	
2020	Did not qualify	
2022	Did not qualify	
2024	Did not qualify	
2026	Did not enter	
2028	To be determined	
2030	To be determined	

=== Uber Cup ===
Year	Round	Pos
1957	Part of France	
1960 to 2022	Did not enter	
2024	Did not qualify	
2026	Did not qualify	
2028	To be determined	
2030	To be determined	

=== Sudirman Cup ===
Year	Round	Pos
1989 to 2021	Did not enter	
2023	Did not qualify	
2025	Did not qualify	
2027	To be determined	
2029	To be determined	

=== African Games ===
==== Mixed team ====
Year	Round	Pos
2003	Withdrew	
2007	Did not enter	
2011	Did not enter	
2015	Did not enter	
2019	Did not enter	
2027	To be determined	

=== African Team Championships ===
==== Men's team ====
Year	Round	Pos
1979 to 2016	Did not enter	
2018	Quarter-finals	
2020	Group stage	
2022	Group stage	8th
2024	Group stage	8th
2026	Did not enter	
2028	To be determined	
2030	To be determined	

==== Women's team ====
Year	Round	Pos
1979 to 2022	Did not enter	
2024	Group stage	7th
2026	Quarter-finals	6th
2028	To be determined	
2030	To be determined	

==== Mixed team ====
Year	Round	Pos
1980 to 2004	Did not enter	
2006	Group stage	
2007	Did not enter	
2009	Group stage	
2011	Did not enter	
2013	Did not enter	
2014	Group stage	
2017	Did not enter	
2019	Did not enter	
2021	Did not enter	
2023	Group stage	10th
2025	Group stage	9th
2027	To be determined	
2029	To be determined	

**Red border color indicates tournament was held on home soil.

== Junior competitive record ==
=== Suhandinata Cup ===
Year	Round	Pos
2000 to 2023	Did not enter	
2024	To be determined	

=== African Youth Games ===
==== Men's team ====
Year	Round	Pos
2018	Did not enter	

==== Women's team ====
Year	Round	Pos
2018	Did not enter	

==== Mixed team ====
Year	Round	Pos
2014	Did not enter	

=== African Junior Team Championships ===
==== Mixed team ====
Year	Round	Pos
1979 to 2003	Did not enter	
2005	Group stage	-
2007	Did not enter	
2009	Did not enter	
2013	Did not enter	
2016	Did not enter	
2021	Did not enter	
2022	Did not enter	
2024	To be determined	

**Red border color indicates tournament was held on home soil.

== Players ==
=== Current squad ===
As of 2 January 2024

==== Men's team ====
Name	DoB/Age	Ranking of event		
Name	DoB/Age	MS	MD	XD
Michel Henri Assembe	6 December 1998 (age 27)	587	388	340
Felix Nkonomo Bengono	24 July 1995 (age 30)	574	388	943
Félix Kemene Atangana	19 January 2002 (age 24)	894	591	518
Pascal Nolem	28 December 2005 (age 20)	756	717	740

==== Women's team ====
Name	DoB/Age	Ranking of event		
Name	DoB/Age	WS	WD	XD
Madeleine Akoumba Ze	24 June 2003 (age 22)	355	287	518
Maeva Anamba	4 April 2005 (age 20)	484	287	340
Khan Diack Woti	13 November 2008 (age 17)	726	-	740
Séraphine Avidi	10 October 2006 (age 19)	726	-	740
