= 2023 African Badminton Championships =

Tournament details
- Dates: 13–16 February (Team event); 17–19 February (Individual event)
- Edition: 26th
- Venue: John Barrable Hall
- Location: Benoni, South Africa

The 2023 African Badminton Championships is the continental badminton championships to crown the best players and teams across Africa. The tournament was held at the John Barrable Hall in Benoni, South Africa, from 13 to 19 February 2023.

== Tournament ==
The 2023 African Badminton Championships were held in two separate events. The mixed team event, officially All Africa Mixed Team Championships 2023, was a continental tournament to crown the best team in Africa and qualification to 2023 Sudirman Cup holding from 13 to 16 February. A total of 13 countries across Africa registered their players to compete at mixed team event.

The individual event, officially All Africa Individual Championships 2023, was a continental tournament to crown the best players in Africa holding from 17 to 19 February.

=== Venue ===
This tournament was held at the John Barrable Hall in Benoni with four courts.

=== Point distribution ===
The individual event of this tournament was graded based on the BWF points system for the BWF International Challenge event. Below is the table with the point distribution for each phase of the tournament.

| Winner | Runner-up | 3/4 | 5/8 | 9/16 | 17/32 | 33/64 | 65/128 |
|---|---|---|---|---|---|---|---|
| 4,000 | 3,400 | 2,800 | 2,200 | 1,520 | 920 | 360 | 170 |

== Medalists ==
| Event | Gold | Silver | Bronze |
|---|---|---|---|
| Teams | Egypt; Adham Hatem Elgamal; Kareem Mahmoud Ezzat; Mahmoud Montaser Montaser Mahmoud; Ahmed Salah; Nour Ahmed Youssri; Rahma Mohamed Saad Eladawy; Doha Hany; Hana Tarek Zaher | Mauritius; Melvin Appiah; Jean Bernard Bongout; Lucas Douce; Khemtish Rai Nundah; Julien Paul; Tejraj Pultoo; Vilina Appiah; Tiya Bhurtun; Lorna Bodha; Layna Luxmi Chiniah; Kobita Dookhee; Kate Ludík | South Africa; Cameron Coetzer; Jarred Elliott; Caden Kakora; Robert Summers; Robert White; Amy Ackerman; Demi Botha; Deidre Laurens; Michaela Ohlson; Diane Olivier; Johanita Scholtz; Anri Schoonees |
| Teams | Egypt; Adham Hatem Elgamal; Kareem Mahmoud Ezzat; Mahmoud Montaser Montaser Mahmoud; Ahmed Salah; Nour Ahmed Youssri; Rahma Mohamed Saad Eladawy; Doha Hany; Hana Tarek Zaher | Mauritius; Melvin Appiah; Jean Bernard Bongout; Lucas Douce; Khemtish Rai Nundah; Julien Paul; Tejraj Pultoo; Vilina Appiah; Tiya Bhurtun; Lorna Bodha; Layna Luxmi Chiniah; Kobita Dookhee; Kate Ludík | Algeria; Mohamed Abderrahime Belarbi; Adel Hamek; Sifeddine Larbaoui; Koceila Mammeri; Youcef Sabri Medel; Mohamed Abdelaziz Ouchefoun; Mounib Celia; Yasmina Chibah; Tanina Mammeri; Linda Mazri; Malak Ouchefoun |
| Men's singles | (Nigeria) Anuoluwapo Juwon Opeyori | (Mauritius) Julien Paul | (South Africa) Robert Summers |
| Men's singles | (Nigeria) Anuoluwapo Juwon Opeyori | (Mauritius) Julien Paul | (Uganda) Brian Kasirye |
| Women's singles | (Uganda) Fadilah Mohamed Rafi | (South Africa) Johanita Scholtz | (Uganda) Husina Kobugabe |
| Women's singles | (Uganda) Fadilah Mohamed Rafi | (South Africa) Johanita Scholtz | (Algeria) Yasmina Chibah |
| Men's doubles | (South Africa) Jarred Elliott (South Africa) Robert Summers | (Algeria) Mohamed Abderrahime Belarbi (Algeria) Adel Hamek | (Algeria) Youcef Sabri Medel (Algeria) Koceila Mammeri |
| Men's doubles | (South Africa) Jarred Elliott (South Africa) Robert Summers | (Algeria) Mohamed Abderrahime Belarbi (Algeria) Adel Hamek | (Réunion) Aaron Assing (Réunion) Xavier Chan Fung Ting |
| Women's doubles | (South Africa) Amy Ackerman (South Africa) Deidre Laurens | (Algeria) Yasmina Chibah (Algeria) Linda Mazri | (Uganda) Husina Kobugabe (Uganda) Gladys Mbabazi |
| Women's doubles | (South Africa) Amy Ackerman (South Africa) Deidre Laurens | (Algeria) Yasmina Chibah (Algeria) Linda Mazri | (Algeria) Celia Mounib (Algeria) Tanina Mammeri |
| Mixed doubles | (Algeria) Koceila Mammeri (Algeria) Tanina Mammeri | (Egypt) Adham Hatem Elgamal (Egypt) Doha Hany | (South Africa) Robert White (South Africa) Deidre Laurens |
| Mixed doubles | (Algeria) Koceila Mammeri (Algeria) Tanina Mammeri | (Egypt) Adham Hatem Elgamal (Egypt) Doha Hany | (South Africa) Jarred Elliott (South Africa) Amy Ackerman |

=== Medal table ===
* Host nation (South Africa)

| Rank | Nation | Gold | Silver | Bronze | Total |
|---|---|---|---|---|---|
| 1 | South Africa* | 2 | 1 | 4 | 7 |
| 2 | Algeria | 1 | 2 | 4 | 7 |
| 3 | Egypt | 1 | 1 | 0 | 2 |
| 4 | Uganda | 1 | 0 | 3 | 4 |
| 5 | Nigeria | 1 | 0 | 0 | 1 |
| 6 | Mauritius | 0 | 2 | 0 | 2 |
| 7 | Réunion | 0 | 0 | 1 | 1 |
| Totals (7 entries) | | 6 | 6 | 12 | 24 |

== Team event ==
=== Group A ===
| Pos | Team | Pld | W | L | MF | MA | MD | GF | GA | GD | PF | PA | PD | Pts | Qualification |
|---|---|---|---|---|---|---|---|---|---|---|---|---|---|---|---|
| 1 | Algeria | 3 | 3 | 0 | 13 | 2 | +11 | 27 | 5 | +22 | 649 | 330 | +319 | 3 | Advance to quarter-finals |
| 2 | Nigeria | 3 | 2 | 1 | 12 | 3 | +9 | 25 | 7 | +18 | 633 | 347 | +286 | 2 | Advance to quarter-finals |
| 3 | Zimbabwe | 3 | 1 | 2 | 5 | 10 | −5 | 10 | 20 | −10 | 372 | 540 | −168 | 1 | |
| 4 | Lesotho | 3 | 0 | 3 | 0 | 15 | −15 | 0 | 30 | −30 | 193 | 630 | −437 | 0 | |

Source: tournamentsoftware.com

==== Algeria vs Lesotho ====
Algeria
5
John Barrable Hall - Court 4
13 February 2023, 10:00 UTC+2

Lesotho
0

| | | | 1 | 2 | 3 |
|---|---|---|---|---|---|
| 1 | (Algeria) (Lesotho) | Koceila Mammeri / Tanina Mammeri; Neo Rahlolo / Khahliso Khetheng | 21; 2 | 21; 5 |
| 2 | (Algeria) (Lesotho) | Yasmina Chibah; Refiloe Moeletsi | 21; 4 | 21; 6 |
| 3 | (Algeria) (Lesotho) | Adel Hamek; Tebello Selemela | 21; 3 | 21; 1 |
| 4 | (Algeria) (Lesotho) | Linda Mazri / Malak Ouchefoun; Khahliso Khetheng / Refiloe Moeletsi | 21; 1 | 21; 1 |
| 5 | (Algeria) (Lesotho) | Sifeddine Larbaoui / Mohamed Abdelaziz Ouchefoun; Neo Rahlolo / Tebello Selemela | 21; 6 | 21; 6 |

==== Nigeria vs Zimbabwe ====
Nigeria
5
John Barrable Hall - Court 1
13 February 2023, 15:00 UTC+2

Zimbabwe
0

| | | | 1 | 2 | 3 |
|---|---|---|---|---|---|
| 1 | (Nigeria) (Zimbabwe) | Yunusa Momoh / Grace Gabriel; Ashel Dziva / Fabiana Layla Oliviero | 21; 11 | 21; 6 |
| 2 | (Nigeria) (Zimbabwe) | Chineye Ibere; Shalom Tapiwanashe Sibanda | 21; 5 | 21; 7 |
| 3 | (Nigeria) (Zimbabwe) | Mustaopha Muhammed; Thabani Mathe | 21; 6 | 21; 12 |
| 4 | (Nigeria) (Zimbabwe) | Grace Gabriel / Chineye Ibere; Fabiana Layla Oliviero / Shalom Tapiwanashe Sibanda | 21; 6 | 21; 9 |
| 5 | (Nigeria) (Zimbabwe) | Yunusa Momoh / Mustaopha Muhammed; Ashel Dziva / Thabani Mathe | 21; 12 | 21; 6 |

==== Algeria vs Zimbabwe ====
Algeria
5
John Barrable Hall - Court 2
14 February 2023, 09:00 UTC+2

Zimbabwe
0

| | | | 1 | 2 | 3 |
|---|---|---|---|---|---|
| 1 | (Algeria) (Zimbabwe) | Sifeddine Larbaoui / Mounib Celia; Ashel Dziva / Fabiana Layla Oliviero | 21; 12 | 21; 8 |
| 2 | (Algeria) (Zimbabwe) | Youcef Sabri Medel; Thabani Mathe | 21; 12 | 21; 12 |
| 3 | (Algeria) (Zimbabwe) | Yasmina Chibah; Shalom Tapiwanashe Sibanda | 21; 3 | 21; 3 |
| 4 | (Algeria) (Zimbabwe) | Mohamed Abderrahime Belarbi / Adel Hamek; Ashel Dziva / Thabani Mathe | 21; 11 | 21; 10 |
| 5 | (Algeria) (Zimbabwe) | Mounib Celia / Tanina Mammeri; Fabiana Layla Oliviero / Shalom Tapiwanashe Sibanda | 21; 4 | 21; 7 |

==== Nigeria vs Lesotho ====
Nigeria
5
John Barrable Hall - Court 1
14 February 2023, 15:00 UTC+2

Lesotho
0

| | | | 1 | 2 | 3 |
|---|---|---|---|---|---|
| 1 | (Nigeria) (Lesotho) | Mujittapha Umar / Chineye Ibere; Tebello Selemela / Refiloe Moeletsi | 21; 6 | 21; 1 |
| 2 | (Nigeria) (Lesotho) | Anuoluwapo Juwon Opeyori; Neo Rahlolo | 21; 7 | 21; 2 |
| 3 | (Nigeria) (Lesotho) | Grace Gabriel; Khahliso Khetheng | 21; 1 | 21; 0 |
| 4 | (Nigeria) (Lesotho) | Yunusa Momoh / Mustaopha Muhammed; Neo Rahlolo / Tebello Selemela | 21; 2 | 21; 7 |
| 5 | (Nigeria) (Lesotho) | Grace Gabriel / Chineye Ibere; Khahliso Khetheng / Refiloe Moeletsi | 21; 9 | 21; 3 |

==== Algeria vs Nigeria ====
Algeria
3
John Barrable Hall - Court 1
15 February 2023, 09:00 UTC+2

Nigeria
2

| | | | 1 | 2 | 3 |
|---|---|---|---|---|---|
| 1 | (Algeria) (Nigeria) | Koceila Mammeri / Tanina Mammeri; Yunusa Momoh / Grace Gabriel | 21; 12 | 21; 13 |
| 2 | (Algeria) (Nigeria) | Mohamed Abderrahime Belarbi; Anuoluwapo Juwon Opeyori | 21; 14 | 15; 21 | 11; 21 |
| 3 | (Algeria) (Nigeria) | Linda Mazri; Chineye Ibere | 15; 21 | 16; 21 |
| 4 | (Algeria) (Nigeria) | Koceila Mammeri / Youcef Sabri Medel; Mustaopha Muhammed / Anuoluwapo Juwon Opeyori | 25; 27 | 21; 15 | 21; 15 |
| 5 | (Algeria) (Nigeria) | Mounib Celia / Tanina Mammeri; Grace Gabriel / Chineye Ibere | 21; 19 | 21; 14 |

==== Zimbabwe vs Lesotho ====
Zimbabwe
5
John Barrable Hall - Court 2
15 February 2023, 09:00 UTC+2

Lesotho
0

| | | | 1 | 2 | 3 |
|---|---|---|---|---|---|
| 1 | (Zimbabwe) (Lesotho) | Ashel Dziva / Fabiana Layla Oliviero; Tebello Selemela / Refiloe Moeletsi | 21; 12 | 21; 13 |
| 2 | (Zimbabwe) (Lesotho) | Blessing Mahwire; Neo Rahlolo | 21; 12 | 21; 5 |
| 3 | (Zimbabwe) (Lesotho) | Shalom Tapiwanashe Sibanda; Khahliso Khetheng | 21; 13 | 21; 11 |
| 4 | (Zimbabwe) (Lesotho) | Blessing Mahwire / Thabani Mathe; Neo Rahlolo / Tebello Selemela | 21; 12 | 21; 16 |
| 5 | (Zimbabwe) (Lesotho) | Fabiana Layla Oliviero / Shalom Tapiwanashe Sibanda; Khahliso Khetheng / Refiloe Moeletsi | 21; 15 | 21; 11 |

=== Group B ===
| Pos | Team | Pld | W | L | MF | MA | MD | GF | GA | GD | PF | PA | PD | Pts | Qualification |
|---|---|---|---|---|---|---|---|---|---|---|---|---|---|---|---|
| 1 | South Africa (H) | 2 | 2 | 0 | 9 | 1 | +8 | 19 | 3 | +16 | 444 | 247 | +197 | 2 | Advance to quarter-finals |
| 2 | Uganda | 2 | 1 | 1 | 6 | 4 | +2 | 13 | 9 | +4 | 414 | 297 | +117 | 1 | Advance to quarter-finals |
| 3 | Mozambique | 2 | 0 | 2 | 0 | 10 | −10 | 0 | 20 | −20 | 106 | 420 | −314 | 0 | |

Source: tournamentsoftware.com
(H) Host

==== South Africa vs Mozambique ====
South Africa
5
John Barrable Hall - Court 1
13 February 2023, 10:00 UTC+2

Mozambique
0

| | | | 1 | 2 | 3 |
|---|---|---|---|---|---|
| 1 | (South Africa) (Mozambique) | Robert White / Deidre Laurens; Edmilson Paulo Mutondo / Afrika Matsinhe | 21; 0 | 21; 1 |
| 2 | (South Africa) (Mozambique) | Diane Olivier; Jessica De Almeida | 21; 5 | 21; 3 |
| 3 | (South Africa) (Mozambique) | Caden Kakora; Idrisse Issofo Mossagy | 21; 4 | 21; 12 |
| 4 | (South Africa) (Mozambique) | Amy Ackerman / Anri Schoonees; Jessica De Almeida / Afrika Matsinhe | 21; 3 | 21; 5 |
| 5 | (South Africa) (Mozambique) | Cameron Coetzer / Robert Summers; Idrisse Issofo Mossagy / Edmilson Paulo Mutondo | 21; 5 | 21; 5 |

==== Uganda vs Mozambique ====
Uganda
5
John Barrable Hall - Court 4
13 February 2023, 15:00 UTC+2

Mozambique
0

| | | | 1 | 2 | 3 |
|---|---|---|---|---|---|
| 1 | (Uganda) (Mozambique) | Amos Muyanja / Kenneth Mwambu; Idrisse Issofo Mossagy / Edmilson Paulo Mutondo | 21; 9 | 21; 10 |
| 2 | (Uganda) (Mozambique) | Gladys Mbabazi / Fadilah Mohamed Rafi; Jessica De Almeida / Afrika Matsinhe | 21; 4 | 21; 2 |
| 3 | (Uganda) (Mozambique) | Brian Kasirye; Idrisse Issofo Mossagy | 21; 8 | 21; 7 |
| 4 | (Uganda) (Mozambique) | Husina Kobugabe; Afrika Matsinhe | 21; 3 | 21; 4 |
| 5 | (Uganda) (Mozambique) | Brian Kasirye / Fadilah Mohamed Rafi; Edmilson Paulo Mutondo / Jessica De Almeida | 21; 11 | 21; 5 |

==== South Africa vs Uganda ====
South Africa
4
John Barrable Hall - Court 4
14 February 2023, 09:00 UTC+2

Uganda
1

| | | | 1 | 2 | 3 |
|---|---|---|---|---|---|
| 1 | (South Africa) (Uganda) | Jarred Elliott / Amy Ackerman; Brian Kasirye / Fadilah Mohamed Rafi | 21; 19 | 21; 16 |
| 2 | (South Africa) (Uganda) | Johanita Scholtz; Gladys Mbabazi | 21; 18 | 21; 11 |
| 3 | (South Africa) (Uganda) | Robert White; Brian Kasirye | 15; 21 | 21; 17 | 13; 21 |
| 4 | (South Africa) (Uganda) | Amy Ackerman / Johanita Scholtz; Husina Kobugabe / Fadilah Mohamed Rafi | 15; 21 | 21; 12 | 23; 21 |
| 5 | (South Africa) (Uganda) | Cameron Coetzer / Robert Summers; Expedito Emuddu / Muzafaru Lubega | 21; 12 | 21; 15 |

=== Group C ===
| Pos | Team | Pld | W | L | MF | MA | MD | GF | GA | GD | PF | PA | PD | Pts | Qualification |
|---|---|---|---|---|---|---|---|---|---|---|---|---|---|---|---|
| 1 | Egypt | 2 | 2 | 0 | 10 | 0 | +10 | 20 | 1 | +19 | 437 | 257 | +180 | 2 | Advance to quarter-finals |
| 2 | Zambia | 2 | 1 | 1 | 4 | 6 | −2 | 8 | 12 | −4 | 320 | 362 | −42 | 1 | Advance to quarter-finals |
| 3 | Cameroon | 2 | 0 | 2 | 1 | 9 | −8 | 3 | 18 | −15 | 279 | 417 | −138 | 0 | |

Source: tournamentsoftware.com

==== Egypt vs Cameroon ====
Egypt
5
John Barrable Hall - Court 3
13 February 2023, 10:00 UTC+2

Cameroon
0

| | | | 1 | 2 | 3 |
|---|---|---|---|---|---|
| 1 | (Egypt) (Cameroon) | Ahmed Salah / Hana Tarek Zaher; Felix Dureil Nkonomo Bengono / Maeva Princia Gertrude Anamba | 21; 10 | 21; 9 |
| 2 | (Egypt) (Cameroon) | Adham Hatem Elgamal; Michel Henri Assembe | 21; 6 | 21; 9 |
| 3 | (Egypt) (Cameroon) | Nour Ahmed Youssri; Madeleine Carene Leticia Akoumba Ze | 21; 18 | 21; 15 |
| 4 | (Egypt) (Cameroon) | Ezzat Kareem / Mahmoud Montaser; Michel Henri Assembe / Felix Dureil Nkonomo Bengono | 21; 7 | 21; 13 |
| 5 | (Egypt) (Cameroon) | Rahma Mohamed Saad Eladawy / Doha Hany; Madeleine Carene Leticia Akoumba Ze / Maeva Princia Gertrude Anamba | 17; 21 | 21; 10 | 21; 9 |

==== Zambia vs Cameroon ====
Zambia
4
John Barrable Hall - Court 3
13 February 2023, 15:00 UTC+2

Cameroon
1

| | | | 1 | 2 | 3 |
|---|---|---|---|---|---|
| 1 | (Zambia) (Cameroon) | Chongo Ezra Mulenga / Evelyn Siamupangila; Michel Henri Assembe / Maeva Princia Gertrude Anamba | 21; 13 | 21; 15 |
| 2 | (Zambia) (Cameroon) | Elizaberth Chipeleme; Madeleine Carene Leticia Akoumba Ze | 11; 21 | 11; 21 |
| 3 | (Zambia) (Cameroon) | Kalombo Mulenga; Felix Dureil Nkonomo Bengono | 21; 16 | 21; 7 |
| 4 | (Zambia) (Cameroon) | Elizaberth Chipeleme / Evelyn Siamupangila; Madeleine Carene Leticia Akoumba Ze / Maeva Princia Gertrude Anamba | 21; 12 | 21; 15 |
| 5 | (Zambia) (Cameroon) | Mwanza Edward / Timothy Kafunda; Michel Henri Assembe / Antoine Eddy Owona Ndimako | 21; 16 | 21; 16 |

==== Egypt vs Zambia ====
Egypt
5
John Barrable Hall - Court 1
14 February 2023, 09:00 UTC+2

Zambia
0

| | | | 1 | 2 | 3 |
|---|---|---|---|---|---|
| 1 | (Egypt) (Zambia) | Adham Hatem Elgamal / Doha Hany; Timothy Kafunda / Elizaberth Chipeleme | 21; 13 | 21; 12 |
| 2 | (Egypt) (Zambia) | Ezzat Kareem; Mwanza Edward | 21; 17 | 21; 18 |
| 3 | (Egypt) (Zambia) | Doha Hany; Evelyn Siamupangila | 21; 9 | 21; 5 |
| 4 | (Egypt) (Zambia) | Adham Hatem Elgamal / Ahmed Salah; Chongo Ezra Mulenga / Kalombo Mulenga | 21; 14 | 21; 15 |
| 5 | (Egypt) (Zambia) | Rahma Mohamed Saad Eladawy / Hana Tarek Zaher; Elizaberth Chipeleme / Evelyn Siamupangila | 21; 17 | 21; 10 |

=== Group D ===
| Pos | Team | Pld | W | L | MF | MA | MD | GF | GA | GD | PF | PA | PD | Pts | Qualification |
|---|---|---|---|---|---|---|---|---|---|---|---|---|---|---|---|
| 1 | Mauritius | 2 | 2 | 0 | 9 | 1 | +8 | 19 | 3 | +16 | 447 | 247 | +200 | 2 | Advance to quarter-finals |
| 2 | Réunion | 2 | 1 | 1 | 6 | 4 | +2 | 13 | 9 | +4 | 381 | 348 | +33 | 1 | Advance to quarter-finals |
| 3 | Botswana | 2 | 0 | 2 | 0 | 10 | −10 | 0 | 20 | −20 | 187 | 420 | −233 | 0 | |

Source: tournamentsoftware.com

==== Mauritius vs Botswana ====
Mauritius
5
John Barrable Hall - Court 2
13 February 2023, 10:00 UTC+2

Botswana
0

| | | | 1 | 2 | 3 |
|---|---|---|---|---|---|
| 1 | (Mauritius) (Botswana) | Julien Paul; Tsamorena Kevin Kgosidialwa | 21; 6 | 21; 7 |
| 2 | (Mauritius) (Botswana) | Kate Ludík; Tebogo Ndzinge | 21; 5 | 21; 11 |
| 3 | (Mauritius) (Botswana) | Melvin Appiah / Jean Bernard Bongout; Tsamorena Kevin Kgosidialwa / Tumelo Moilwa | 21; 8 | 21; 10 |
| 4 | (Mauritius) (Botswana) | Lorna Bodha / Kobita Dookhee; Tebogo Ndzinge / Keletso Ntebela | 21; 5 | 21; 13 |
| 5 | (Mauritius) (Botswana) | Julien Paul / Kate Ludík; Tumelo Moilwa / Keletso Ntebela | 21; 5 | 21; 6 |

==== Réunion vs Botswana ====
Réunion
5
John Barrable Hall - Court 2
13 February 2023, 15:00 UTC+2

Botswana
0

| | | | 1 | 2 | 3 |
|---|---|---|---|---|---|
| 1 | (Réunion) (Botswana) | Chan Fung Ting Xavier / Ly-Hoa Chai; Tumelo Moilwa / Keletso Ntebela | 21; 9 | 21; 8 |
| 2 | (Réunion) (Botswana) | Marina Bielle; Tebogo Ndzinge | 21; 18 | 21; 18 |
| 3 | (Réunion) (Botswana) | Assing Aaron; Tsamorena Kevin Kgosidialwa | 21; 10 | 21; 8 |
| 4 | (Réunion) (Botswana) | Marina Bielle / Ly-Hoa Chai; Tebogo Ndzinge / Keletso Ntebela | 21; 17 | 21; 7 |
| 5 | (Réunion) (Botswana) | Assing Aaron / Chan Fung Ting Xavier; Tsamorena Kevin Kgosidialwa / Tumelo Moilwa | 21; 9 | 21; 7 |

==== Mauritius vs Réunion ====
Mauritius
4
John Barrable Hall - Court 3
14 February 2023, 09:00 UTC+2

Réunion
1

| | | | 1 | 2 | 3 |
|---|---|---|---|---|---|
| 1 | (Mauritius) (Réunion) | Julien Paul; Assing Aaron | 21; 9 | 21; 7 |
| 2 | (Mauritius) (Réunion) | Kate Ludík; Marina Bielle | 21; 10 | 21; 7 |
| 3 | (Mauritius) (Réunion) | Melvin Appiah / Jean Bernard Bongout; Assing Aaron / Chan Fung Ting Xavier | 16; 21 | 21; 13 | 15; 21 |
| 4 | (Mauritius) (Réunion) | Lorna Bodha / Kobita Dookhee; Marina Bielle / Ly-Hoa Chai | 21; 16 | 21; 15 |
| 5 | (Mauritius) (Réunion) | Julien Paul / Kate Ludík; Chan Fung Ting Xavier / Ly-Hoa Chai | 17; 21 | 21; 19 | 21; 12 |

=== Knockout stage ===
==== Bracket ====
Quarter-finals
Egypt | 3
Uganda | 1
South Africa | 3
Zambia | 0
Nigeria | 1
Mauritius | 3
Réunion | 0
Algeria | 3

Semi-finals
Egypt | 3
South Africa | 1
Mauritius | 3
Algeria | 2

Final
Egypt | 3
Mauritius | 2

==== Quarter-finals ====
===== Egypt vs Uganda =====
Egypt
3
John Barrable Hall - Court 1
15 February 2023, 15:00 UTC+2

Uganda
1

| | | | 1 | 2 | 3 |
|---|---|---|---|---|---|---|
| 1 | (Egypt) (Uganda) | Adham Hatem Elgamal / Doha Hany; Brian Kasirye / Fadilah Mohamed Rafi | 14; 21 | 16; 21 |
| 2 | (Egypt) (Uganda) | Nour Ahmed Youssri; Husina Kobugabe | 21; 15 | 21; 16 |
| 3 | (Egypt) (Uganda) | Ahmed Salah; Brian Kasirye | 21; 19 | 8; 21 | 21; 19 |
| 4 | (Egypt) (Uganda) | Nour Ahmed Youssri / Doha Hany; Husina Kobugabe / Fadilah Mohamed Rafi | 21; 15 | 21; 18 |
| 5 | (Egypt) (Uganda) | Adham Hatem Elgamal / Ahmed Salah; Expedito Emuddu / Muzafaru Lubega | | | | not played |

===== South Africa vs Zambia =====
South Africa
3
John Barrable Hall - Court 3
15 February 2023, 15:00 UTC+2

Zambia
0

| | | | 1 | 2 | 3 |
|---|---|---|---|---|---|---|
| 1 | (South Africa) (Zambia) | Jarred Elliott / Amy Ackerman; Chongo Mulenga / Evelyn Siamupangila | 21; 7 | 21; 12 |
| 2 | (South Africa) (Zambia) | Robert White; Kalombo Mulenga | 21; 10 | 22; 20 |
| 3 | (South Africa) (Zambia) | Johanita Scholtz; Elizaberth Chipeleme | 21; 7 | 21; 10 |
| 4 | (South Africa) (Zambia) | Cameron Coetzer / Robert Summers; Chongo Mulenga / Kalombo Mulenga | | | | not played |
| 5 | (South Africa) (Zambia) | Amy Ackerman / Deidre Laurens; Elizaberth Chipeleme / Evelyn Siamupangila | | | | not played |

===== Nigeria vs Mauritius =====
Nigeria
1
John Barrable Hall - Court 2
15 February 2023, 15:00 UTC+2

Mauritius
3

| | | | 1 | 2 | 3 |
|---|---|---|---|---|---|---|
| 1 | (Nigeria) (Mauritius) | Yunusa Momoh / Grace Gabriel; Jean Bernard Bongout / Kobita Dookhee | 16; 21 | 19; 21 |
| 2 | (Nigeria) (Mauritius) | Anuoluwapo Juwon Opeyori; Julien Paul | 21; 15 | 21; 15 |
| 3 | (Nigeria) (Mauritius) | Chineye Ibere; Kate Ludík | 16; 21 | 6; 21 |
| 4 | (Nigeria) (Mauritius) | Mustaopha Muhammed / Anuoluwapo Juwon Opeyori; Jean Bernard Bongout / Julien Paul | 21; 18 | 15; 21 | 14; 21 |
| 5 | (Nigeria) (Mauritius) | Grace Gabriel / Chineye Ibere; Kobita Dookhee / Kate Ludík | | | | not played |

===== Réunion vs Algeria =====
Réunion
0
John Barrable Hall - Court 4
15 February 2023, 15:00 UTC+2

Algeria
3

| | | | 1 | 2 | 3 |
|---|---|---|---|---|---|---|
| 1 | (Réunion) (Algeria) | Chan Fung Ting Xavier / Ly-Hoa Chai; Koceila Mammeri / Tanina Mammeri | 15; 21 | 9; 21 |
| 2 | (Réunion) (Algeria) | Marina Bielle; Yasmina Chibah | 11; 21 | 20; 22 |
| 3 | (Réunion) (Algeria) | Loic Bertil; Adel Hamek | 17; 21 | 13; 21 |
| 4 | (Réunion) (Algeria) | Assing Aaron / Chan Fung Ting Xavier; Koceila Mammeri / Youcef Sabri Medel | | | | not played |
| 5 | (Réunion) (Algeria) | Marina Bielle / Ly-Hoa Chai; Mounib Celia / Tanina Mammeri | | | | not played |

==== Semi-finals ====
===== Egypt vs South Africa =====
Egypt
3
John Barrable Hall - Court 2
16 February 2023, 09:00 UTC+2

South Africa
1

| | | | 1 | 2 | 3 |
|---|---|---|---|---|---|---|
| 1 | (Egypt) (South Africa) | Ahmed Salah / Doha Hany; Jarred Elliott / Amy Ackerman | 10; 21 | 15; 21 |
| 2 | (Egypt) (South Africa) | Adham Hatem Elgamal; Robert White | 21; 19 | 19; 21 | 21; 13 |
| 3 | (Egypt) (South Africa) | Nour Ahmed Youssri; Johanita Scholtz | 21; 17 | 21; 18 |
| 4 | (Egypt) (South Africa) | Adham Hatem Elgamal / Ahmed Salah; Cameron Coetzer / Robert Summers | 18; 21 | 21; 16 | 21; 18 |
| 5 | (Egypt) (South Africa) | Nour Ahmed Youssri / Doha Hany; Amy Ackerman / Deidre Laurens | | | | not played |

===== Mauritius vs Algeria =====
Mauritius
3
John Barrable Hall - Court 1
16 February 2023, 09:00 UTC+2

Algeria
2

| | | | 1 | 2 | 3 |
|---|---|---|---|---|---|
| 1 | (Mauritius) (Algeria) | Jean Bernard Bongout / Kobita Dookhee; Koceila Mammeri / Tanina Mammeri | 7; 21 | 14; 21 |
| 2 | (Mauritius) (Algeria) | Julien Paul; Adel Hamek | 21; 17 | 23; 21 |
| 3 | (Mauritius) (Algeria) | Kate Ludík; Yasmina Chibah | 21; 10 | 19; 21 | 21; 16 |
| 4 | (Mauritius) (Algeria) | Jean Bernard Bongout / Julien Paul; Koceila Mammeri / Youcef Sabri Medel | 21; 19 | 10; 21 | 14; 21 |
| 5 | (Mauritius) (Algeria) | Kobita Dookhee / Kate Ludík; Mounib Celia / Tanina Mammeri | 21; 15 | 21; 18 |

==== Finals ====
===== Egypt vs Mauritius =====
Egypt
3
John Barrable Hall - Court 1
16 February 2023, 15:00 UTC+2

Mauritius
2

| | | | 1 | 2 | 3 |
|---|---|---|---|---|---|
| 1 | (Egypt) (Mauritius) | Adham Hatem Elgamal / Doha Hany; Jean Bernard Bongout / Kobita Dookhee | 14; 21 | 17; 21 |
| 2 | (Egypt) (Mauritius) | Ahmed Salah; Julien Paul | 11; 21 | 17; 21 |
| 3 | (Egypt) (Mauritius) | Nour Ahmed Youssri; Kate Ludík | 21; 7 | 21; 17 |
| 4 | (Egypt) (Mauritius) | Adham Hatem Elgamal / Ahmed Salah; Jean Bernard Bongout / Julien Paul | 17; 21 | 22; 20 | 21; 18 |
| 5 | (Egypt) (Mauritius) | Nour Ahmed Youssri / Doha Hany; Kobita Dookhee / Kate Ludík | 21; 14 | 21; 16 |

=== Final ranking ===
| Pos | Team | Pld | W | L | Pts | MD | GD | PD | Final result |
|---|---|---|---|---|---|---|---|---|---|
| 1st place, gold medalist(s) | Egypt | 5 | 5 | 0 | 5 | +15 | +25 | +188 | Champions |
| 2nd place, silver medalist(s) | Mauritius | 5 | 4 | 1 | 4 | +10 | +20 | +211 | Runners-up |
| 3rd place, bronze medalist(s) | Algeria | 5 | 4 | 1 | 4 | +13 | +26 | +369 | Eliminated in semi-finals |
| 3rd place, bronze medalist(s) | South Africa | 4 | 3 | 1 | 3 | +9 | +20 | +255 | Eliminated in semi-finals |
| 5 | Nigeria | 4 | 2 | 2 | 2 | +7 | +15 | +261 | Eliminated in quarter-finals |
| 6 | Uganda | 3 | 1 | 2 | 1 | 0 | +1 | +118 | Eliminated in quarter-finals |
| 7 | Réunion | 3 | 1 | 2 | 1 | −1 | −2 | −9 | Eliminated in quarter-finals |
| 8 | Zambia | 3 | 1 | 2 | 1 | −5 | −10 | −103 | Eliminated in quarter-finals |
| 9 | Zimbabwe | 3 | 1 | 2 | 1 | −5 | −10 | −168 | Eliminated in group stage |
| 10 | Cameroon | 2 | 0 | 2 | 0 | −8 | −15 | −138 | Eliminated in group stage |
| 11 | Botswana | 2 | 0 | 2 | 0 | −10 | −20 | −233 | Eliminated in group stage |
| 12 | Mozambique | 2 | 0 | 2 | 0 | −10 | −20 | −314 | Eliminated in group stage |
| 13 | Lesotho | 3 | 0 | 3 | 0 | −15 | −30 | −437 | Eliminated in group stage |

== Individual event ==
=== Men's singles ===
Semifinals
8 | (South Africa) Robert Summers | 19 | 17
3 | (Nigeria) Anuoluwapo Juwon Opeyori | 21 | 21
4 | (Uganda) Brian Kasirye | 16 | 15
7 | (Mauritius) Julien Paul | 21 | 21

Final
3 | (Nigeria) Anuoluwapo Juwon Opeyori | 18 | 21 | 21
7 | (Mauritius) Julien Paul | 21 | 13 | 18

=== Women's singles ===
Semifinals
5 | (Uganda) Husina Kobugabe | 13 | 21 | 16
4 | (South Africa) Johanita Scholtz | 21 | 19 | 21
(Algeria) Yasmina Chibah | 15 | 21 | 16
7 | (Uganda) Fadilah Mohamed Rafi | 21 | 19 | 21

Final
4 | (South Africa) Johanita Scholtz | 21 | 14 | 16
7 | (Uganda) Fadilah Mohamed Rafi | 14 | 21 | 21

=== Men's doubles ===
Semifinals
1 | (Algeria) Youcef Sabri Medel (Algeria) Koceila Mammeri | 21 | 18 | 19
(South Africa) Jarred Elliott (South Africa) Robert Summers | 12 | 21 | 21
(Réunion) Aaron Assing (Réunion) Xavier Chan Fung Ting | 21 | 19 | 16
2 | (Algeria) Mohamed Abderrahime Belarbi (Algeria) Adel Hamek | 14 | 21 | 21

Final
(South Africa) Jarred Elliott (South Africa) Robert Summers | 21 | 21
2 | (Algeria) Mohamed Abderrahime Belarbi (Algeria) Adel Hamek | 13 | 17

=== Women's doubles ===
Semifinals
(Uganda) Husina Kobugabe (Uganda) Gladys Mbabazi | 17 | 17
(Algeria) Yasmina Chibah (Algeria) Linda Mazri | 21 | 21
(Algeria) Mounib Celia (Algeria) Tanina Mammeri | 18 | 19
2 | (South Africa) Amy Ackerman (South Africa) Deidre Laurens | 21 | 21

Final
(Algeria) Yasmina Chibah (Algeria) Linda Mazri | 19 | 12
2 | (South Africa) Amy Ackerman (South Africa) Deidre Laurens | 21 | 21

=== Mixed doubles ===
Semifinals
1 | (Egypt) Adham Hatem Elgamal (Egypt) Doha Hany | 21 | 21
(South Africa) Robert White (South Africa) Deidre Laurens | 10 | 18
3 | (South Africa) Jarred Elliott (South Africa) Amy Ackerman | 20 | 18
2 | (Algeria) Koceila Mammeri (Algeria) Tanina Mammeri | 22 | 21

Final
1 | (Egypt) Adham Hatem Elgamal (Egypt) Doha Hany | 15 | 13
2 | (Algeria) Koceila Mammeri (Algeria) Tanina Mammeri | 21 | 21
