= 2020 All Africa Men's and Women's Team Badminton Championships =

Tournament details
- Dates: 10–13 February
- Venue: Cairo Stadium Hall 2
- Location: Cairo, Egypt

The 2020 All Africa Men's and Women's Team Badminton Championships was a continental stage tournament of Thomas and Uber Cups, and also to crown the best men's and women's badminton team in Africa. This tournament was held in Cairo, Egypt between 10 and 13 February 2020.

== Medalists ==
Event	Gold	Silver	Bronze
Men's team	Algeria; Adel Hamek; Koceila Mammeri; Mohamed Abderrahime Belarbi; Youcef Sabri Medel	Mauritius; Aatish Lubah; Georges Paul; Jean Bernard Bongout; Khabir Teeluck; Melvin Appiah; Tejraj Pultoo	South Africa; Cameron Coetzer; Jarred Elliott; Jason Mann; Ruan Snyman; Robert Summers; Bongani Von Bodenstein
Men's team	Algeria; Adel Hamek; Koceila Mammeri; Mohamed Abderrahime Belarbi; Youcef Sabri Medel	Mauritius; Aatish Lubah; Georges Paul; Jean Bernard Bongout; Khabir Teeluck; Melvin Appiah; Tejraj Pultoo	Egypt; Abdelrahman Abdelhakim; Monier Fayez Botros; Adham Hatem Elgamal; Mahmoud Montaser; Mohamed Mostafa Kamel; Ahmed Salah
Women's team	Egypt; Nour Ahmed Youssri; Jana Ashraf; Doha Hany; Hadia Hosny; Hana Tarek Mohamed; Rahma Mohamed Saad Eladawy	Algeria; Halla Bouksani; Linda Mazri; Malak Ouchefoune; Ines Ziani	Mauritius; Aurélie Allet; Lorna Bodha; Kobita Dookhee; Kate Foo Kune; Jemimah Leung For Sang; Shaama Sandooyea

== Tournament ==
The All Africa Men's and Women's Team Badminton Championships officially crowns the best male and female national badminton teams in Africa and at the same time works as the African qualification event towards the 2020 Thomas & Uber Cup finals. 13 teams consisting of 9 men's team and 4 women's team have entered the tournament.

=== Venue ===
Venue of this tournament is Cairo Stadium Hall 2, in Cairo, Egypt.

== Men's team ==
All times are Egypt Standard Time (UTC+02:00).

=== Group stage ===
==== Group A ====
Pos	Team	Pld	W	L	MF	MA	MD	GF	GA	GD	PF	PA	PD	Pts	Qualification
1	Algeria	3	3	0	14	1	+13	28	6	+22	687	446	+241	3	Knockout stage
2	Mauritius	3	2	1	11	4	+7	24	9	+15	628	457	+171	2	Knockout stage
3	Uganda	3	1	2	5	10	−5	13	20	−7	532	570	−38	1	
4	Tunisia	3	0	3	0	15	−15	0	30	−30	260	634	−374	0	

Source: TS
- Algeria vs Tunisia

Algeria
5
Cairo Stadium Hall 2, Court 1
10 February 2020 10:00

Tunisia
0

			1	2	3
1	(Algeria) (Tunisia)	Mohamed Abderrahime Belarbi; Rahali Mouin	21; 4	21; 3
2	(Algeria) (Tunisia)	Koceila Mammeri; Khayati Ouzaier	21; 7	21; 5
3	(Algeria) (Tunisia)	Adel Hamek; Drira Mohamed Yassine	21; 11	21; 6
4	(Algeria) (Tunisia)	Mohamed Abderrahime Belarbi / Koceila Mammeri; Khayati Ouzaier / Rahali Mouin	21; 10	21; 10
5	(Algeria) (Tunisia)	Adel Hamek / Youcef Sabri Medel; Drira Mohamed Yassine / Rabah El Mootez Belleh	21; 9	21; 8

- Mauritius vs Uganda

Mauritius
5
Cairo Stadium Hall 2, Court 2
10 February 2020 10:00

Uganda
0

			1	2	3
1	(Mauritius) (Uganda)	Georges Paul; Daniel Mihigo	21; 14	21; 11
2	(Mauritius) (Uganda)	Aatish Lubah; Brian Kasirye	18; 21	21; 11	21; 18
3	(Mauritius) (Uganda)	Jean Bernard Bongout; Israel Wanagalya	21; 18	21; 6
4	(Mauritius) (Uganda)	Aatish Lubah / Georges Julien Paul; Davies Senono / Israel Wanagalya	21; 11	21; 7
5	(Mauritius) (Uganda)	Jean Bernard Bongout / Tejraj Pultoo; Brian Kasirye / Daniel Mihigo	21; 8	21; 10

- Mauritius vs Tunisia

Mauritius
5
Cairo Stadium Hall 2, Court 1
11 February 2020 09:00

Tunisia
0

			1	2	3
1	(Mauritius) (Tunisia)	Melvin Appiah; Rahali Mouin	21; 8	21; 7
2	(Mauritius) (Tunisia)	Tejraj Pultoo; Khayati Ouzaier	25; 23	21; 8
3	(Mauritius) (Tunisia)	Khabir Teeluck; Rabah El Mootez Belleh	21; 4	21; 5
4	(Mauritius) (Tunisia)	Melvin Appiah / Jean Bernard Bongout; Khayati Ouzaier / Rahali Mouin	21; 12	21; 10
5	(Mauritius) (Tunisia)	Tejraj Pultoo / Khabir Teeluck; Drira Mohamed Yassine / Rabah El Mootez Belleh	21; 7	21; 6

- Algeria vs Uganda

Algeria
5
Cairo Stadium Hall 2, Court 2
11 February 2020 09:00

Uganda
0

			1	2	3
1	(Algeria) (Uganda)	Youcef Sabri Medel; Daniel Mihigo	21; 18	21; 16
2	(Algeria) (Uganda)	Mohamed Abderrahime Belarbi; Brian Kasirye	21; 14	18; 21	21; 10
3	(Algeria) (Uganda)	Adel Hamek; Israel Wanagalya	21; 11	21; 17
4	(Algeria) (Uganda)	Koceila Mammeri / Youcef Sabri Medel; Davies Senono / Israel Wanagalya	21; 11	21; 18
5	(Algeria) (Uganda)	Mohamed Abderrahime Belarbi / Adel Hamek; Brian Kasirye / Daniel Mihigo	21; 11	17; 21	21; 19

- Uganda vs Tunisia

Uganda
5
Cairo Stadium Hall 2, Court 1
11 February 2020 17:30

Tunisia
0

			1	2	3
1	(Uganda) (Tunisia)	Davies Senono; Rahali Mouin	21; 8	21; 11
2	(Uganda) (Tunisia)	Daniel Mihigo; Khayati Ouzaier	21; 7	21; 9
3	(Uganda) (Tunisia)	Brian Kasirye; Drira Mohamed Yassine	21; 7	21; 7
4	(Uganda) (Tunisia)	Davies Senono / Israel Wanagalya; Khayati Ouzaier / Rahali Mouin	21; 15	21; 17
5	(Uganda) (Tunisia)	Brian Kasirye / Daniel Mihigo; Drira Mohamed Yassine / Rabah El Mootez Belleh	21; 10	21; 6

- Algeria vs Mauritius

Algeria
4
Cairo Stadium Hall 2, Court 2
11 February 2020 17:30

Mauritius
1

			1	2	3
1	(Algeria) (Mauritius)	Youcef Sabri Medel; Georges Paul	18; 21	14; 21
2	(Algeria) (Mauritius)	Mohamed Abderrahime Belarbi; Aatish Lubah	21; 9	21; 15
3	(Algeria) (Mauritius)	Adel Hamek; Jean Bernard Bongout	21; 13	18; 21	21; 8
4	(Algeria) (Mauritius)	Koceila Mammeri / Youcef Sabri Medel; Aatish Lubah / Georges Paul	14; 21	21; 19	21; 16
5	(Algeria) (Mauritius)	Mohamed Abderrahime Belarbi / Adel Hamek; Melvin Appiah / Jean Bernard Bongout	21; 13	21; 9

==== Group B ====
Pos	Team	Pld	W	L	MF	MA	MD	GF	GA	GD	PF	PA	PD	Pts	Qualification
1	Egypt	4	4	0	19	1	+18	39	6	+33	936	496	+440	4	Knockout stage
2	South Africa	4	3	1	14	6	+8	30	13	+17	825	533	+292	3	Knockout stage
3	Morocco	4	2	2	12	8	+4	26	16	+10	770	500	+270	2	
4	Cameroon	4	1	3	5	15	−10	10	30	−20	468	630	−162	1	
5	Sierra Leone	0	0	0	0	0	0	0	0	0	0	0	0	0	Withdrew

Source: TS
- South Africa vs Cameroon

South Africa
5
Cairo Stadium Hall 2, Court 4
10 February 2020 10:00

Cameroon
0

			1	2	3
1	(South Africa) (Cameroon)	Ruan Snyman; Félix Michel Kemene Atangana	21; 11	21; 6
2	(South Africa) (Cameroon)	Cameron Coetzer; Mamoudou Soudi	21; 6	21; 5
3	(South Africa) (Cameroon)	Jason Mann / Bongani van Bodenstein; Michel Henri Assembe / Félix Michel Kemene Atangana	21; 13	21; 3
4	(South Africa) (Cameroon)	Robert Summers; Michel Henri Assembe	21; 10	21; 10
5	(South Africa) (Cameroon)	Cameron Coetzer / Jarred Elliott; Felix Dureil Nkonomo Bengono / Mamoudou Soudi	21; 13	21; 7

- Egypt vs Cameroon

Egypt
5
Cairo Stadium Hall 2, Court 4
10 February 2020 18:30

Cameroon
0

			1	2	3
1	(Egypt) (Cameroon)	Adham Hatem Elgamal; Félix Michel Kemene Atangana	21; 7	21; 13
2	(Egypt) (Cameroon)	Ahmed Salah; Michel Henri Assembe	21; 6	21; 1
3	(Egypt) (Cameroon)	Abdelrahman Abdelhakim; Felix Dureil Nkonomo Bengono	21; 4	21; 5
4	(Egypt) (Cameroon)	Abdelrahman Abdelhakim / Mohamed Mostafa Kamel; Félix Michel Kemene Atangana / Michel Henri Assembe	21; 10	21; 12
5	(Egypt) (Cameroon)	Monier Fayez Botros / Mahmoud Montaser; Felix Dureil Nkonomo Bengono / Mamoudou Soudi	21; 11	21; 18

- Egypt vs Morocco

Egypt
5
Cairo Stadium Hall 2, Court 4
11 February 2020 09:00

Morocco
0

			1	2	3
1	(Egypt) (Morocco)	Ahmed Salah; Anas Idlahoucine	21; 6	21; 15
2	(Egypt) (Morocco)	Abdelrahman Abdelhakim; Bilal El Harab	18; 21	21; 14	21; 14
3	(Egypt) (Morocco)	Mohamed Mostafa Kamel; Driss Bourroum	21; 7	14; 21	21; 4
4	(Egypt) (Morocco)	Monier Fayez Botros / Mahmoud Montaser; Anas Idlahoucine / Youssef Oubella	21; 19	21; 11
5	(Egypt) (Morocco)	Adham Hatem Elgamal / Ahmed Salah; Driss Bourroum / Bilal El Harab	21; 18	21; 15

- Egypt vs South Africa

Egypt
4
Cairo Stadium Hall 2, Court 3
11 February 2020 17:30

South Africa
1

			1	2	3
1	(Egypt) (South Africa)	Adham Hatem Elgamal; Ruan Snyman	21; 23	21; 15	18; 21
2	(Egypt) (South Africa)	Abdelrahman Abdelhakim; Cameron Coetzer	19; 21	21; 18	25; 23
3	(Egypt) (South Africa)	Mohamed Mostafa Kamel; Robert Summers	21; 10	21; 7
4	(Egypt) (South Africa)	Adham Hatem Elgamal / Ahmed Salah; Jason Mann / Bongani van Bodenstein	21; 17	22; 20
5	(Egypt) (South Africa)	Abdelrahman Abdelhakim / Mohamed Mostafa Kamel; Cameron Coetzer / Jarred Elliott	21; 19	22; 24	21; 16

- Morocco vs Cameroon

Morocco
5
Cairo Stadium Hall 2, Court 4
11 February 2020 17:30

Cameroon
0

			1	2	3
1	(Morocco) (Cameroon)	Anas Idlahoucine; Félix Michel Kemene Atangana	21; 10	21; 7
2	(Morocco) (Cameroon)	Bilal El Harab; Mamoudou Soudi	21; 5	21; 10
3	(Morocco) (Cameroon)	Driss Bourroum; Michel Henri Assembe	21; 8	21; 7
4	(Morocco) (Cameroon)	Anas Idlahoucine / Youssef Oubella; Felix Dureil Nkonomo Bengono / Mamoudou Soudi	21; 14	21; 11
5	(Morocco) (Cameroon)	Driss Bourroum / Bilal El Harab; Michel Henri Assembe / Félix Michel Kemene Atangana	21; 6	21; 9

- South Africa vs Morocco

South Africa
3
Cairo Stadium Hall 2, Court 4
12 February 2020 10:00

Morocco
2

			1	2	3
1	(South Africa) (Morocco)	Ruan Snyman; Anas Idlahoucine	21; 13	21; 12
2	(South Africa) (Morocco)	Cameron Coetzer; Bilal El Harab	21; 14	21; 17
3	(South Africa) (Morocco)	Robert Summers; Driss Bourroum	4; 21	11; 21
4	(South Africa) (Morocco)	Cameron Coetzer / Jarred Elliott; Anas Idlahoucine / Youssef Oubella	21; 18	21; 17
5	(South Africa) (Morocco)	Jason Mann / Bongani van Bodenstein; Driss Bourroum / Bilal El Harab	13; 21	17; 21

=== Knockout stage ===
Semi-finals
12 February
Algeria	3
South Africa	0
12 February
Mauritius	3
Egypt	0

Final
13 February
Algeria	3
Mauritius	2

==== Semifinals ====
- Algeria vs South Africa

Algeria
3
Cairo Stadium Hall 2, Court 1
12 February 2020 16:00

South Africa
0

			1	2	3
1	(Algeria) (South Africa)	Youcef Sabri Medel; Ruan Snyman	21; 14	21; 12
2	(Algeria) (South Africa)	Mohamed Abderrahime Belarbi; Cameron Coetzer	21; 13	21; 11
3	(Algeria) (South Africa)	Adel Hamek; Bongani von Bodenstein	21; 7	21; 16
4	(Algeria) (South Africa)	Koceila Mammeri / Youcef Sabri Medel; Jason Mann / Ruan Snyman				not played
5	(Algeria) (South Africa)	Mohamed Abderrahime Belarbi / Adel Hamek; Cameron Coetzer / Jarred Elliott				not played

- Mauritius vs Egypt

Mauritius
3
Cairo Stadium Hall 2, Court 2
12 February 2020 16:00

Egypt
0

			1	2	3
1	(Mauritius) (Egypt)	Georges Paul; Ahmed Salah	18; 21	21; 17	21; 12
2	(Mauritius) (Egypt)	Aatish Lubah; Abdelrahman Abdelhakim	21; 13	21; 12
3	(Mauritius) (Egypt)	Jean Bernard Bongout; Mohamed Mostafa Kamel	21; 18	21; 15
4	(Mauritius) (Egypt)	Aatish Lubah / Georges Paul; Adham Hatem Elgamal / Ahmed Salah				not played
5	(Mauritius) (Egypt)	Melvin Appiah / Jean Bernard Bongout; Abdelrahman Abdelhakim / Mohamed Mostafa Kamel				not played

==== Final ====
- Algeria vs Mauritius

Algeria
3
Cairo Stadium Hall 2, Court 1
13 February 2020 14:00

Mauritius
2

			1	2	3
1	(Algeria) (Mauritius)	Youcef Sabri Medel; Georges Paul	18; 21	9; 21
2	(Algeria) (Mauritius)	Mohamed Abderrahime Belarbi; Aatish Lubah	9; 21	19; 21
3	(Algeria) (Mauritius)	Adel Hamek; Jean Bernard Bongout	22; 20	21; 15
4	(Algeria) (Mauritius)	Koceila Mammeri / Youcef Sabri Medel; Georges Paul / Aatish Lubah	15; 21	22; 20	21; 13
5	(Algeria) (Mauritius)	Mohamed Abderrahime Belarbi / Adel Hamek; Melvin Appiah / Jean Bernard Bongout	22; 20	21; 16

== Women's team ==
All times are Egypt Standard Time (UTC+02:00).

=== Round robin ===
Pos	Team	Pld	W	L	MF	MA	MD	GF	GA	GD	PF	PA	PD	Pts	Qualification
1	Egypt	3	3	0	10	5	+5	20	11	+9	638	539	+99	3	Uber Cup
2	Algeria	3	2	1	10	5	+5	20	11	+9	563	522	+41	2	
3	Mauritius	3	1	2	8	7	+1	17	16	+1	573	565	+8	1	
4	South Africa	3	0	3	2	13	−11	8	27	−19	551	699	−148	0	

Source: TS
- Egypt vs Algeria

Egypt
3
Cairo Stadium Hall 2, Court 1
10 February 2020 18:30

Algeria
2

			1	2	3
1	(Egypt) (Algeria)	Hadia Hosny; Halla Bouksani	15; 21	19; 21
2	(Egypt) (Algeria)	Nour Ahmed Youssri; Linda Mazri	21; 17	21; 17
3	(Egypt) (Algeria)	Jana Ashraf; Malak Ouchefoune	19; 21	14; 21
4	(Egypt) (Algeria)	Doha Hany / Hadia Hosny; Halla Bouksani / Linda Mazri	21; 13	21; 12
5	(Egypt) (Algeria)	Nour Ahmed Youssri / Jana Ashraf; Malak Ouchefoune / Ines Ziani	21; 6	21; 11

- Mauritius vs South Africa

Mauritius
4
Cairo Stadium Hall 2, Court 2
10 February 2020 18:30

South Africa
1

			1	2	3
1	(Mauritius) (South Africa)	Kate Foo Kune; Deidre Laurens Jordaan	21; 2	21; 10
2	(Mauritius) (South Africa)	Lorna Bodha; Michelle Butler-Emmett	16; 21	10; 21
3	(Mauritius) (South Africa)	Kobita Dookhee; Amy Ackerman	21; 14	21; 19
4	(Mauritius) (South Africa)	Aurélie Allet / Kate Foo Kune; Amy Ackerman / Michelle Butler-Emmett	16; 21	21; 13	22; 20
5	(Mauritius) (South Africa)	Lorna Bodha / Kobita Dookhee; Deidre Laurens Jordaan / Lehandre Schoeman	10; 21	21; 16	21; 17

- Egypt vs South Africa

Egypt
4
Cairo Stadium Hall 2, Court 1
11 February 2020 14:00

South Africa
1

			1	2	3
1	(Egypt) (South Africa)	Doha Hany; Deidre Laurens Jordaan	21; 9	21; 12
2	(Egypt) (South Africa)	Hadia Hosny; Michelle Butler-Emmett	21; 14	21; 12
3	(Egypt) (South Africa)	Nour Ahmed Youssri; Amy Ackerman	21; 17	19; 21	21; 12
4	(Egypt) (South Africa)	Rahma Mohamed Saad Eladawy / Hana Tarek Mohamed; Deidre Laurens Jordaan / Lehandre Schoeman	21; 19	20; 22	22; 24
5	(Egypt) (South Africa)	Doha Hany / Hadia Hosny; Amy Ackerman / Michelle Butler-Emmett	21; 12	21; 16

- Mauritius vs Algeria

Mauritius
2
Cairo Stadium Hall 2, Court 2
11 February 2020 14:00

Algeria
3

			1	2	3
1	(Mauritius) (Algeria)	Kate Foo Kune; Halla Bouksani	21; 12	21; 11
2	(Mauritius) (Algeria)	Aurélie Allet; Linda Mazri	15; 21	7; 21
3	(Mauritius) (Algeria)	Kobita Dookhee; Malak Ouchefoune	11; 21	14; 21
4	(Mauritius) (Algeria)	Aurélie Allet / Kate Foo Kune; Halla Bouksani / Malak Ouchefoune	20; 22	12; 21
5	(Mauritius) (Algeria)	Lorna Bodha / Kobita Dookhee; Linda Mazri / Ines Ziani	21; 11	21; 14

- South Africa vs Algeria

South Africa
0
Cairo Stadium Hall 2, Court 1
12 February 2020 10:00

Algeria
5

			1	2	3
1	(South Africa) (Algeria)	Deidre Laurens Jordaan; Halla Bouksani	11; 21	5; 21
2	(South Africa) (Algeria)	Michelle Butler-Emmett; Linda Mazri	13; 21	10; 21
3	(South Africa) (Algeria)	Amy Ackerman; Malak Ouchefoune	14; 21	20; 22
4	(South Africa) (Algeria)	Deidre Laurens Jordaan / Lehandre Schoeman; Linda Mazri / Ines Ziani	21; 16	20; 22	18; 21
5	(South Africa) (Algeria)	Amy Ackerman / Michelle Butler-Emmett; Halla Bouksani / Malak Ouchefoune	15; 21	19; 21

- Egypt vs Mauritius

Egypt
3
Cairo Stadium Hall 2, Court 2
12 February 2020 10:00

Mauritius
2

			1	2	3
1	(Egypt) (Mauritius)	Doha Hany; Kate Foo Kune	15; 21	13; 21
2	(Egypt) (Mauritius)	Hadia Hosny; Lorna Bodha	21; 12	21; 7
3	(Egypt) (Mauritius)	Nour Ahmed Youssri; Kobita Dookhee	21; 15	21; 15
4	(Egypt) (Mauritius)	Doha Hany / Hadia Hosny; Aurélie Allet / Kobita Dookhee	11; 21	23; 21	21; 14
5	(Egypt) (Mauritius)	Nour Ahmed Youssri / Jana Ashraf; Lorna Bodha / Kate Foo Kune	16; 21	21; 21
