= 2026 All Africa Men's and Women's Team Badminton Championships =

Tournament details
- Dates: 9–12 February
- Edition: 11th
- Venue: Royal Aria Indoor Hall
- Location: Gaborone, Botswana

The 2026 All Africa Men's and Women's Team Badminton Championships was a continental stage tournament to crown the best men's and women's badminton team in Africa. The tournament also served as the African qualifiers for the 2026 Thomas & Uber Cup to be held in . This tournament was held in Gaborone, Botswana between 9 and 12 February 2026.

The title holders of the men's team were Algeria, who have been defending their title since 2018. South Africa are the women's team defending champion.

== Medalists ==
Event	Gold	Silver	Bronze
Men's team	Algeria; Mohamed Abderrahime Belarbi; Adel Hamek; Oussama Keddou; Koceila Mammeri; Youcef Sabri Medel; Mohamed Abdelaziz Ouchefoun	Mauritius; Jean Bernard Bongout; Lucas Douce; Khemtish Rai Nundah; Julien Paul; Tejas Savoo	Egypt; Abdelrahman Abdelsattar; Ahmed Elbahnasawy; Adham Hatem Elgamal; Kareem Ezzat; Mohamed Mostafa Kamel; Seif Omar
Men's team	Algeria; Mohamed Abderrahime Belarbi; Adel Hamek; Oussama Keddou; Koceila Mammeri; Youcef Sabri Medel; Mohamed Abdelaziz Ouchefoun	Mauritius; Jean Bernard Bongout; Lucas Douce; Khemtish Rai Nundah; Julien Paul; Tejas Savoo	Zambia; Mark Banda; Timothy Kafunda; Wesley Kafunda; Chongo Mulenga; Kalombo Mulenga; Jonathan Mumba; Rodrick Mwansa; Edward Mwanza
Women's team	South Africa; Amy Ackerman; Elme de Villiers; Chloe Lai; Johanita Scholtz; Anri Schoonees	Egypt; Nour Ahmed Youssri; Ganna Elwazery; Doha Hany; Malayka Mohamed; Fatema Rabie; Hana Tarek	Nigeria; Zainab Damilola Alabi; Ruth Chinenye Ebere; Ojo Favour Ifeloluwa; Sofiat Arinola Obanishola; Olajumoke Obasanmi; Jonah Peace Tunze
Women's team	South Africa; Amy Ackerman; Elme de Villiers; Chloe Lai; Johanita Scholtz; Anri Schoonees	Egypt; Nour Ahmed Youssri; Ganna Elwazery; Doha Hany; Malayka Mohamed; Fatema Rabie; Hana Tarek	Algeria; Halla Bouksani; Yasmina Chibah; Sirine Ibrahim; Tanina Mammeri; Linda Mazri; Malak Ouchefoun

=== Medal table ===
* Host nation (Botswana)

Rank	Nation	Gold	Silver	Bronze	Total
1	Algeria	1	0	1	2
2	South Africa	1	0	0	1
3	Egypt	0	1	1	2
4	Mauritius	0	1	0	1
5	Nigeria	0	0	1	1
5	Zambia	0	0	1	1
Totals (6 entries)		2	2	4	8

== Tournament ==
The All Africa Men's and Women's Team Badminton Championships officially crowns the best male and female national badminton teams in Africa and at the same time works as the African qualification event towards the 2026 Thomas & Uber Cup finals.

=== Venue ===
The team event was held at the Royal Aria Indoor Hall, in Gaborone, Botswana.

=== Draw ===
The draw was revealed on 9 February 2026. The men's team group stage consists of four groups while the women's team group stage consists of three groups. 23 teams consisting of 13 men's team and 10 women's team have entered the tournament.

- Men's team

Group A	Group B	Group C	Group D
Nigeria; Ghana; Botswana	Egypt; Zimbabwe; Burundi	Algeria; Zambia; Madagascar	Mauritius; South Africa; Seychelles; Lesotho

- Women's team

Group A	Group B	Group C
Algeria; Mauritius; Botswana; Lesotho	Egypt; Cameroon; Zambia	South Africa; Nigeria; Zimbabwe

== Men's team ==
=== Group stage ===
==== Group A ====
Pos	Team	Pld	W	L	MF	MA	MD	GF	GA	GD	PF	PA	PD	Pts	Qualification
1	Nigeria	2	2	0	10	0	+10	20	1	+19	438	254	+184	2	Knockout stage
2	Ghana	2	1	1	3	7	−4	8	15	−7	361	448	−87	1	Knockout stage
3	Botswana (H)	2	0	2	2	8	−6	5	17	−12	334	431	−97	0	

Source: TS
(H) Host
- Nigeria vs Botswana

Nigeria
5
Royal Aria Indoor Hall, Court 1
9 February 2026, 09:00

Botswana
0

			1	2	3
1	(Nigeria) (Botswana)	Alhaji Aliyu Shehu; Tsamorena Kevin Kgosidialwa	21; 11	21; 10
2	(Nigeria) (Botswana)	Joseph Abel; Tefo Kabomo	21; 9	21; 3
3	(Nigeria) (Botswana)	Ibrahim Dewo Ahmed; Godknows Kethabanetswe	21; 13	21; 7
4	(Nigeria) (Botswana)	Joseph Abel / Alhaji Aliyu Shehu; Tumelo Moilwa / Tshepo Perekisi	21; 14	21; 13
5	(Nigeria) (Botswana)	Ibrahim Dewo Ahmed / Saidu Aliyu; Tefo Kabomo / Godknows Kethabanetswe	21; 19	21; 15

- Ghana vs Botswana

Ghana
3
Royal Aria Indoor Hall, Court 4
9 February 2026, 15:00

Botswana
2

			1	2	3
1	(Ghana) (Botswana)	Francis Obeng-Shang; Tsamorena Kevin Kgosidialwa	23; 21	22; 20
2	(Ghana) (Botswana)	Ahmad Abdul-Samad; Tefo Kabomo	21; 15	21; 13
3	(Ghana) (Botswana)	Reuben Teye Tetteh; Godknows Kethabanetswe	17; 21	10; 21
4	(Ghana) (Botswana)	Ahmad Abdul-Samad / Ebenezer Korampong; Tumelo Moilwa / Tshepo Perekisi	21; 23	21; 10	22; 20
5	(Ghana) (Botswana)	Francis Obeng-Shang / Reuben Teye Tetteh; Tefo Kabomo / Godknows Kethabanetswe	7; 21	21; 14	15; 21

- Nigeria vs Ghana

Nigeria
5
Royal Aria Indoor Hall, Court 2
10 February 2026, 09:00

Ghana
0

			1	2	3
1	(Nigeria) (Ghana)	Saidu Aliyu; Ahmad Abdul-Samad	21; 14	21; 14
2	(Nigeria) (Ghana)	Alhaji Aliyu Shehu; Ebenezer Korampong	21; 9	21; 8
3	(Nigeria) (Ghana)	Joseph Abel; Reuben Teye Tetteh	21; 10	21; 8
4	(Nigeria) (Ghana)	Joseph Abel / Alhaji Aliyu Shehu; Ahmad Abdul-Samad / Ebenezer Korampong	21; 18	21; 10
5	(Nigeria) (Ghana)	Ibrahim Dewo Ahmed / Saidu Aliyu; Francis Obeng-Shang / Reuben Teye Tetteh	18; 21	21; 14	21; 14

==== Group B ====
Pos	Team	Pld	W	L	MF	MA	MD	GF	GA	GD	PF	PA	PD	Pts	Qualification
1	Egypt	2	2	0	10	0	+10	20	1	+19	437	143	+294	2	Knockout stage
2	Zimbabwe	2	1	1	5	5	0	11	10	+1	322	297	+25	1	Knockout stage
3	Burundi	2	0	2	0	10	−10	0	20	−20	101	420	−319	0	

Source: TS
- Egypt vs Burundi

Egypt
5
Royal Aria Indoor Hall, Court 4
9 February 2026, 09:00

Burundi
0

			1	2	3
1	(Egypt) (Burundi)	Adham Hatem Elgamal; Patrick-Adonis Munezero	21; 2	21; 4
2	(Egypt) (Burundi)	Kareem Ezzat; Yves Ngabo	21; 1	21; 2
3	(Egypt) (Burundi)	Seif Omar; Kevin Kwizera	21; 1	21; 3
4	(Egypt) (Burundi)	Ahmed Elbahnasawy / Kareem Ezzat; Kevin Kwizera / Patrick-Adonis Munezero	21; 6	21; 6
5	(Egypt) (Burundi)	Abdelrahman Abdelsattar / Mohamed Mostafa Kamel; Yves Ngabo / Chadrack Niyonkuru	21; 3	21; 3

- Zimbabwe vs Burundi

Zimbabwe
5
Royal Aria Indoor Hall, Court 1
9 February 2026, 15:00

Burundi
0

			1	2	3
1	(Zimbabwe) (Burundi)	Thabani Mathe; Patrick-Adonis Munezero	21; 13	21; 9
2	(Zimbabwe) (Burundi)	Trinity Chipumho; Yves Ngabo	21; 2	21; 3
3	(Zimbabwe) (Burundi)	Blessing Mahwire; Kevin Kwizera	21; 8	21; 7
4	(Zimbabwe) (Burundi)	Trinity Chipumho / Thabani Mathe; Kevin Kwizera / Patrick-Adonis Munezero	21; 7	21; 6
5	(Zimbabwe) (Burundi)	Alfred Bonde / Blessing Mahwire; Yves Ngabo / Chadrack Niyonkuru	21; 6	21; 9

- Egypt vs Zimbabwe

Egypt
5
Royal Aria Indoor Hall, Court 3
10 February 2026, 09:00

Zimbabwe
0

			1	2	3
1	(Egypt) (Zimbabwe)	Ahmed Elbahnasawy; Thabani Mathe	21; 15	21; 9
2	(Egypt) (Zimbabwe)	Abdelrahman Abdelsattar; Trinity Chipumho	21; 13	17; 21	21; 10
3	(Egypt) (Zimbabwe)	Mohamed Mostafa Kamel; Blessing Mahwire	21; 4	21; 3
4	(Egypt) (Zimbabwe)	Adham Hatem Elgamal / Kareem Ezzat; Trinity Chipumho / Thabani Mathe	21; 14	21; 13
5	(Egypt) (Zimbabwe)	Abdelrahman Abdelsattar / Seif Omar; Alfred Bonde / Blessing Mahwire	21; 6	21; 4

==== Group C ====
Pos	Team	Pld	W	L	MF	MA	MD	GF	GA	GD	PF	PA	PD	Pts	Qualification
1	Algeria	2	2	0	10	0	+10	20	1	+19	436	284	+152	2	Knockout stage
2	Zambia	2	1	1	5	5	0	11	10	+1	366	330	+36	1	Knockout stage
3	Madagascar	2	0	2	0	10	−10	0	20	−20	232	420	−188	0	

Source: TS
- Algeria vs Madagascar

Algeria
5
Royal Aria Indoor Hall, Court 2
9 February 2026, 09:00

Madagascar
0

			1	2	3
1	(Algeria) (Madagascar)	Adel Hamek; Lalaïna Ramanana-Rahary	21; 18	21; 18
2	(Algeria) (Madagascar)	Mohamed Abderrahime Belarbi; Tokinirina Razafimandimby	21; 10	21; 13
3	(Algeria) (Madagascar)	Mohamed Abdelaziz Ouchefoun; Andriambola Razakasoavina	21; 14	21; 13
4	(Algeria) (Madagascar)	Koceila Mammeri / Youcef Sabri Medel; Lalaïna Ramanana-Rahary / Tokinirina Razafimandimby	21; 13	21; 12
5	(Algeria) (Madagascar)	Oussama Keddou / Mohamed Abdelaziz Ouchefoun; Hery-Zo Rakotoherinivo / Andriambola Razakasoavina	21; 10	21; 7

- Zambia vs Madagascar

Zambia
5
Royal Aria Indoor Hall, Court 3
9 February 2026, 15:00

Madagascar
0

			1	2	3
1	(Zambia) (Madagascar)	Kalombo Mulenga; Lalaïna Ramanana-Rahary	21; 10	21; 12
2	(Zambia) (Madagascar)	Chongo Mulenga; Tokinirina Razafimandimby	21; 13	21; 12
3	(Zambia) (Madagascar)	Rodrick Mwansa; Hery-Zo Rakotoherinivo	21; 11	21; 6
4	(Zambia) (Madagascar)	Chongo Mulenga / Kalombo Mulenga; Lalaïna Ramanana-Rahary / Tokinirina Razafimandimby	21; 9	21; 12
5	(Zambia) (Madagascar)	Edward Mwanza / Timothy Kafunda; Hery-Zo Rakotoherinivo / Andriambola Razakasoavina	21; 9	21; 10

- Algeria vs Zambia

Algeria
5
Royal Aria Indoor Hall, Court 4
10 February 2026, 09:00

Zambia
0

			1	2	3
1	(Algeria) (Zambia)	Adel Hamek; Kalombo Mulenga	21; 14	16; 21	21; 16
2	(Algeria) (Zambia)	Mohamed Abderrahime Belarbi; Chongo Mulenga	21; 14	21; 18
3	(Algeria) (Zambia)	Mohamed Abdelaziz Ouchefoun; Rodrick Mwansa	21; 9	21; 11
4	(Algeria) (Zambia)	Koceila Mammeri / Youcef Sabri Medel; Chongo Mulenga / Kalombo Mulenga	21; 15	21; 10
5	(Algeria) (Zambia)	Oussama Keddou / Mohamed Abdelaziz Ouchefoun; Timothy Kafunda / Wesley Kafunda	21; 11	21; 17

==== Group D ====
Pos	Team	Pld	W	L	MF	MA	MD	GF	GA	GD	PF	PA	PD	Pts	Qualification
1	Mauritius	3	3	0	15	0	+15	30	0	+30	634	289	+345	3	Knockout stage
2	South Africa	3	2	1	10	5	+5	20	10	+10	570	378	+192	2	Knockout stage
3	Seychelles	3	1	2	4	11	−7	8	23	−15	386	596	−210	1	
4	Lesotho	3	0	3	1	14	−13	3	28	−25	316	643	−327	0	

Source: TS
- Mauritius vs Lesotho

Mauritius
5
Royal Aria Indoor Hall, Court 3
9 February 2026, 09:00

Lesotho
0

			1	2	3
1	(Mauritius) (Lesotho)	Julien Paul; Mokhali Maleke	21; 8	21; 6
2	(Mauritius) (Lesotho)	Jean Bernard Bongout; Neo Rahlolo	21; 3	21; 6
3	(Mauritius) (Lesotho)	Khemtish Rai Nundah; Katleho Mohapi	21; 7	21; 10
4	(Mauritius) (Lesotho)	Lucas Douce / Julien Paul; Mokhali Maleke / Katleho Mohapi	21; 9	21; 7
5	(Mauritius) (Lesotho)	Jean Bernard Bongout / Khemtish Rai Nundah; Rethabile Sehole / Neo Tsokelo	21; 7	21; 2

- South Africa vs Seychelles

South Africa
5
Royal Aria Indoor Hall, Court 2
9 February 2026, 15:00

Seychelles
0

			1	2	3
1	(South Africa) (Seychelles)	Caden Kakora; Jakim Renaud	21; 6	21; 6
2	(South Africa) (Seychelles)	Miguel Vigario; Yohan Didon	21; 8	21; 17
3	(South Africa) (Seychelles)	Anthony Phillips; Daniel Bedier	21; 12	21; 9
4	(South Africa) (Seychelles)	Caden Kakora / Anthony Phillips; Yohan Didon / Jakim Renaud	21; 8	21; 8
5	(South Africa) (Seychelles)	Miguel Vigario / Ricardo Vigario; Daniel Bedier / Joshua Raguin	21; 7	21; 8

- Mauritius vs Seychelles

Mauritius
5
Royal Aria Indoor Hall, Court 1
10 February 2026, 09:00

Seychelles
0

			1	2	3
1	(Mauritius) (Seychelles)	Lucas Douce; Jakim Renaud	21; 7	21; 6
2	(Mauritius) (Seychelles)	Jean Bernard Bongout; Yohan Didon	21; 7	21; 4
3	(Mauritius) (Seychelles)	Khemtish Rai Nundah; Daniel Bedier	21; 11	21; 7
4	(Mauritius) (Seychelles)	Jean Bernard Bongout / Julien Paul; Yohan Didon / Jakim Renaud	21; 7	21; 8
5	(Mauritius) (Seychelles)	Lucas Douce / Khemtish Rai Nundah; Daniel Bedier / Joshua Raguin	21; 2	21; 15

- South Africa vs Lesotho

South Africa
5
Royal Aria Indoor Hall, Court 1
10 February 2026, 15:00

Lesotho
0

			1	2	3
1	(South Africa) (Lesotho)	Caden Kakora; Mokhali Maleke	21; 11	21; 2
2	(South Africa) (Lesotho)	Anthony Phillips; Neo Rahlolo	21; 4	21; 5
3	(South Africa) (Lesotho)	Misha Bredell; Limpho Matlosa	21; 12	21; 6
4	(South Africa) (Lesotho)	Caden Kakora / Anthony Phillips; Katleho Mohapi / Neo Rahlolo	21; 8	21; 9
5	(South Africa) (Lesotho)	Miguel Vigario / Ricardo Vigario; Limpho Matlosa / Neo Tsokelo	21; 5	21; 13

- Mauritius vs South Africa

Mauritius
5
Royal Aria Indoor Hall, Court 2
11 February 2026, 09:00

South Africa
0

			1	2	3
1	(Mauritius) (South Africa)	Lucas Douce; Caden Kakora	21; 11	21; 18
2	(Mauritius) (South Africa)	Julien Paul; Anthony Phillips	21; 15	25; 23
3	(Mauritius) (South Africa)	Khemtish Rai Nundah; Misha Bredell	21; 9	21; 11
4	(Mauritius) (South Africa)	Jean Bernard Bongout / Julien Paul; Caden Kakora / Anthony Phillips	21; 15	21; 17
5	(Mauritius) (South Africa)	Lucas Douce / Khemtish Rai Nundah; Miguel Vigario / Ricardo Vigario	21; 19	21; 12

- Seychelles vs Lesotho

Seychelles
4
Royal Aria Indoor Hall, Court 4
11 February 2026, 09:00

Lesotho
1

			1	2	3
1	(Seychelles) (Lesotho)	Jakim Renaud; Mokhali Maleke	21; 12	21; 8
2	(Seychelles) (Lesotho)	Yohan Didon; Neo Rahlolo	19; 21	17; 21
3	(Seychelles) (Lesotho)	Daniel Bedier; Katleho Mohapi	21; 13	21; 18
4	(Seychelles) (Lesotho)	Yohan Didon / Jakim Renaud; Mokhali Maleke / Rethabile Sehole	21; 8	21; 13
5	(Seychelles) (Lesotho)	Daniel Bedier / Joshua Raguin; Katleho Mohapi / Neo Rahlolo	16; 21	22; 20	23; 21

=== Knockout stage ===
==== Bracket ====
Quarter-finals
11 February 17:00
Algeria	3
Ghana	0
11 February 17:00
Egypt	3
South Africa	2
11 February 17:00
Zambia	3
Nigeria	1
11 February 17:00
Zimbabwe	0
Mauritius	3

Semi-finals
12 February 9:00
Algeria	3
Egypt	1
12 February 9:00
Zambia	2
Mauritius	3

Final
12 February 15:00
Algeria	3
Mauritius	2

==== Quarter-finals ====
- Algeria vs Ghana

Algeria
3
Royal Aria Indoor Hall, Court 1
11 February 2026, 17:00

Ghana
0

			1	2	3
1	(Algeria) (Ghana)	Adel Hamek; Francis Obeng-Shang	21; 12	21; 7
2	(Algeria) (Ghana)	Mohamed Abderrahime Belarbi; Ahmad Abdul-Samad	21; 10	21; 8
3	(Algeria) (Ghana)	Koceila Mammeri; Ebenezer Korampong	21; 9	21; 13
4	(Algeria) (Ghana)	Mohamed Abderrahime Belarbi / Youcef Sabri Medel; Ahmad Abdul-Samad / Ebenezer Korampong				not played
5	(Algeria) (Ghana)	Adel Hamek / Koceila Mammeri; Francis Obeng-Shang / Reuben Teye Tetteh				not played

- Zambia vs Nigeria

Zambia
3
Royal Aria Indoor Hall, Court 2
11 February 2026, 17:00

Nigeria
1

			1	2	3
1	(Zambia) (Nigeria)	Kalombo Mulenga; Alhaji Aliyu Shehu	15; 21	21; 10	21; 17
2	(Zambia) (Nigeria)	Chongo Mulenga; Joseph Abel	18; 21	21; 11	21; 14
3	(Zambia) (Nigeria)	Rodrick Mwansa; Ibrahim Dewo Ahmed	21; 17	7; 21	15; 21
4	(Zambia) (Nigeria)	Chongo Mulenga / Kalombo Mulenga; Joseph Abel / Alhaji Aliyu Shehu	21; 14	21; 11
5	(Zambia) (Nigeria)	Edward Mwanza / Timothy Kafunda; Ibrahim Dewo Ahmed / Saidu Aliyu				not played

- Egypt vs South Africa

Egypt
3
Royal Aria Indoor Hall, Court 3
11 February 2026, 17:00

South Africa
2

			1	2	3
1	(Egypt) (South Africa)	Adham Hatem Elgamal; Caden Kakora	21; 13	15; 21	21; 13
2	(Egypt) (South Africa)	Kareem Ezzat; Miguel Vigario	21; 10	21; 14
3	(Egypt) (South Africa)	Seif Omar; Anthony Phillips	21; 9	10; 21	14; 21
4	(Egypt) (South Africa)	Ahmed Elbahnasawy / Kareem Ezzat; Caden Kakora / Anthony Phillips	21; 19	18; 21	18; 21
5	(Egypt) (South Africa)	Abdelrahman Abdelsattar / Mohamed Mostafa Kamel; Miguel Vigario / Ricardo Vigario	21; 18	21; 13

- Zimbabwe vs Mauritius

Zimbabwe
0
Royal Aria Indoor Hall, Court 4
11 February 2026, 17:00

Mauritius
3

			1	2	3
1	(Zimbabwe) (Mauritius)	Trinity Chipumho; Julien Paul	11; 21	5; 21
2	(Zimbabwe) (Mauritius)	Thabani Mathe; Jean Bernard Bongout	15; 21	11; 21
3	(Zimbabwe) (Mauritius)	Alfred Bonde; Khemtish Rai Nundah	3; 21	5; 21
4	(Zimbabwe) (Mauritius)	Trinity Chipumho / Thabani Mathe; Jean Bernard Bongout / Julien Paul				not played
5	(Zimbabwe) (Mauritius)	Alfred Bonde / Blessing Mahwire; Lucas Douce / Khemtish Rai Nundah				not played

==== Semi-finals ====
- Algeria vs Egypt

Algeria
3
Royal Aria Indoor Hall, Court 4
12 February 2026, 09:00

Egypt
1

			1	2	3
1	(Algeria) (Egypt)	Adel Hamek; Adham Hatem Elgamal	21; 7	21; 17
2	(Algeria) (Egypt)	Mohamed Abderrahime Belarbi; Kareem Ezzat	18; 21	21; 23
3	(Algeria) (Egypt)	Koceila Mammeri; Mohamed Mostafa Kamel	21; 15	21; 10
4	(Algeria) (Egypt)	Mohamed Abderrahime Belarbi / Youcef Sabri Medel; Ahmed Ali Bahnsawy / Kareem Ezzat	21; 18	21; 15
5	(Algeria) (Egypt)	Adel Hamek / Koceila Mammeri; Adham Hatem Elgamal / Mohamed Mostafa Kamel				not played

- Zambia vs Mauritius

Zambia
2
Royal Aria Indoor Hall, Court 1
12 February 2026, 09:00

Mauritius
3

			1	2	3
1	(Zambia) (Mauritius)	Kalombo Mulenga; Lucas Douce	21; 19	11; 21	22; 20
2	(Zambia) (Mauritius)	Chongo Mulenga; Julien Paul	9; 21	21; 18	10; 21
3	(Zambia) (Mauritius)	Rodrick Mwansa; Khemtish Rai Nundah	12; 21	19; 21
4	(Zambia) (Mauritius)	Chongo Mulenga / Kalombo Mulenga; Lucas Douce / Julien Paul	13; 21	25; 23	21; 19
5	(Zambia) (Mauritius)	Timothy Kafunda / Edward Mwanza; Jean Bernard Bongout / Khemtish Rai Nundah	6; 21	8; 21

==== Final ====
- Algeria vs Mauritius

Algeria
3
Royal Aria Indoor Hall, Court 2
12 February 2026, 15:00

Mauritius
2

			1	2	3
1	(Algeria) (Mauritius)	Adel Hamek; Lucas Douce	21; 9	21; 16
2	(Algeria) (Mauritius)	Mohamed Abderrahime Belarbi; Julien Paul	21; 18	12; 21	13; 21
3	(Algeria) (Mauritius)	Koceila Mammeri; Khemtish Rai Nundah	12; 21	21; 12	18; 21
4	(Algeria) (Mauritius)	Mohamed Abderrahime Belarbi / Youcef Sabri Medel; Lucas Douce / Julien Paul	22; 20	22; 20
5	(Algeria) (Mauritius)	Adel Hamek / Koceila Mammeri; Jean Bernard Bongout / Khemtish Rai Nundah	17; 21	21; 18	21; 14

=== Final ranking ===
Pos	Team	Pld	W	L	Pts	MD	GD	PD	Final result
1st place, gold medalist(s)	Algeria	5	5	0	5	+16	+32	+268	Champions
2nd place, silver medalist(s)	Mauritius	6	5	1	5	+18	+36	+469	Runners-up
3rd place, bronze medalist(s)	Egypt	4	3	1	3	+9	+15	+284	Eliminated in semi-finals
3rd place, bronze medalist(s)	Zambia	4	2	2	2	+1	+4	+2	Eliminated in semi-finals
5	Nigeria	3	2	1	2	+8	+16	+160	Eliminated in quarter-finals
6	South Africa	4	2	2	2	+4	+7	+163	Eliminated in quarter-finals
7	Zimbabwe	3	1	2	1	−3	−5	−51	Eliminated in quarter-finals
8	Ghana	3	1	2	1	−7	−13	−154	Eliminated in quarter-finals
9	Seychelles	3	1	2	1	−7	−15	−210	Eliminated in group stage
10	Botswana (H)	2	0	2	0	−6	−12	−97	Eliminated in group stage
11	Madagascar	2	0	2	0	−10	−20	−188	Eliminated in group stage
12	Burundi	2	0	2	0	−10	−20	−319	Eliminated in group stage
13	Lesotho	3	0	3	0	−13	−25	−327	Eliminated in group stage

== Women's team ==
=== Group stage ===
==== Group A ====
Pos	Team	Pld	W	L	MF	MA	MD	GF	GA	GD	PF	PA	PD	Pts	Qualification
1	Mauritius	3	3	0	13	2	+11	26	5	+21	628	346	+282	3	Knockout stage
2	Algeria	3	2	1	12	3	+9	25	6	+19	627	345	+282	2	Knockout stage
3	Botswana (H)	3	1	2	5	10	−5	10	20	−10	401	492	−91	1	
4	Lesotho	3	0	3	0	15	−15	0	30	−30	157	630	−473	0	

Source: TS
(H) Host
- Mauritius vs Botswana

Mauritius
5
Royal Aria Indoor Hall, Court 2
9 February 2026, 12:00

Botswana
0

			1	2	3
1	(Mauritius) (Botswana)	Elsa How Hong; Tsholofelo Willie	21; 7	21; 9
2	(Mauritius) (Botswana)	Tiya Bhurtun; Tessa Kabelo	21; 9	21; 15
3	(Mauritius) (Botswana)	Chiara How Hong; Tebogo Ndzinge	21; 10	21; 2
4	(Mauritius) (Botswana)	Chiara How Hong / Elsa How Hong; Keletso Ntebela / Tsholofelo Willie	21; 11	21; 8
5	(Mauritius) (Botswana)	Tiya Bhurtun / Layna Luxmi Chiniah; Tessa Kabelo / Tebogo Ndzinge	21; 13	21; 12

- Algeria vs Lesotho

Algeria
5
Royal Aria Indoor Hall, Court 4
9 February 2026, 12:00

Lesotho
0

			1	2	3
1	(Algeria) (Lesotho)	Yasmina Chibah; Lerato Matlosa	21; 5	21; 4
2	(Algeria) (Lesotho)	Halla Bouksani; Thato Talejane	21; 2	21; 4
3	(Algeria) (Lesotho)	Malak Ouchefoun; Kelumetse Moeletsi	21; 4	21; 4
4	(Algeria) (Lesotho)	Sirine Ibrahim / Tanina Mammeri; Lerato Matlosa / Kelumetse Moeletsi	21; 6	21; 5
5	(Algeria) (Lesotho)	Halla Bouksani / Malak Ouchefoun; Khahliso Khetheng / Thato Talejane	21; 5	21; 3

- Mauritius vs Lesotho

Mauritius
5
Royal Aria Indoor Hall, Court 2
10 February 2026, 12:00

Lesotho
0

			1	2	3
1	(Mauritius) (Lesotho)	Tiya Bhurtun; Lerato Matlosa	21; 5	21; 6
2	(Mauritius) (Lesotho)	Chiara How Hong; Thato Talejane	21; 4	21; 3
3	(Mauritius) (Lesotho)	Layna Luxmi Chiniah; Khahliso Khetheng	21; 2	21; 2
4	(Mauritius) (Lesotho)	Chiara How Hong / Elsa How Hong; Lerato Matlosa / Thato Talejane	21; 4	21; 5
5	(Mauritius) (Lesotho)	Tiya Bhurtun / Layna Luxmi Chiniah; Khahliso Khetheng / Kelumetse Moeletsi	21; 7	21; 5

- Algeria vs Botswana

Algeria
5
Royal Aria Indoor Hall, Court 4
10 February 2026, 12:00

Botswana
0

			1	2	3
1	(Algeria) (Botswana)	Yasmina Chibah; Tsholofelo Willie	21; 6	21; 6
2	(Algeria) (Botswana)	Halla Bouksani; Tessa Kabelo	21; 15	21; 13
3	(Algeria) (Botswana)	Malak Ouchefoun; Tebogo Ndzinge	21; 15	21; 5
4	(Algeria) (Botswana)	Sirine Ibrahim / Tanina Mammeri; Keletso Ntebela / Tsholofelo Willie	21; 3	21; 13
5	(Algeria) (Botswana)	Halla Bouksani / Malak Ouchefoun; Tessa Kabelo / Tebogo Ndzinge	21; 9	21; 10

- Botswana vs Lesotho

Botswana
5
Royal Aria Indoor Hall, Court 3
10 February 2026, 15:00

Lesotho
0

			1	2	3
1	(Botswana) (Lesotho)	Tsholofelo Willie; Lerato Matlosa	21; 18	21; 12
2	(Botswana) (Lesotho)	Tessa Kabelo; Khahliso Khetheng	21; 7	21; 5
3	(Botswana) (Lesotho)	Tebogo Ndzinge; Kelumetse Moeletsi	21; 3	21; 3
4	(Botswana) (Lesotho)	Keletso Ntebela / Tsholofelo Willie; Khahliso Khetheng / Lerato Matlosa	21; 11	21; 7
5	(Botswana) (Lesotho)	Tessa Kabelo / Tebogo Ndzinge; Kelumetse Moeletsi / Thato Talejane	21; 4	21; 2

- Algeria vs Mauritius

Algeria
2
Royal Aria Indoor Hall, Court 1
11 February 2026, 09:00

Mauritius
3

			1	2	3
1	(Algeria) (Mauritius)	Yasmina Chibah; Elsa How Hong	15; 21	14; 21
2	(Algeria) (Mauritius)	Halla Bouksani; Tiya Bhurtun	21; 15	21; 12
3	(Algeria) (Mauritius)	Malak Ouchefoun; Chiara How Hong	21; 18	18; 21	17; 21
4	(Algeria) (Mauritius)	Sirine Ibrahim / Tanina Mammeri; Chiara How Hong / Elsa How Hong	21; 19	21; 17
5	(Algeria) (Mauritius)	Halla Bouksani / Malak Ouchefoun; Tiya Bhurtun / Layna Luxmi Chiniah	18; 21	20; 22

==== Group B ====
Pos	Team	Pld	W	L	MF	MA	MD	GF	GA	GD	PF	PA	PD	Pts	Qualification
1	Egypt	2	2	0	10	0	+10	20	2	+18	459	215	+244	2	Knockout stage
2	Cameroon	2	1	1	5	5	0	12	10	+2	377	343	+34	1	Knockout stage
3	Zambia	2	0	2	0	10	−10	0	20	−20	142	420	−278	0	

Source: TS
- Egypt vs Zambia

Egypt
5
Royal Aria Indoor Hall, Court 1
9 February 2026, 12:00

Zambia
0

			1	2	3
1	(Egypt) (Zambia)	Nour Ahmed Youssri; Mary Chilambe	21; 1	21; 3
2	(Egypt) (Zambia)	Doha Hany; Esther Mwansa	21; 3	21; 5
3	(Egypt) (Zambia)	Fatema Rabie; Matildah Kalandanya	21; 7	21; 5
4	(Egypt) (Zambia)	Nour Ahmed Youssri / Doha Hany; Mary Chilambe / Evelyn Siamupangila	21; 5	21; 6
5	(Egypt) (Zambia)	Ganna Elwazery / Hana Tarek; Matildah Kalandanya / Esther Mwansa	21; 7	21; 6

- Cameroon vs Zambia

Cameroon
5
Royal Aria Indoor Hall, Court 1
10 February 2026, 12:00

Zambia
0

			1	2	3
1	(Cameroon) (Zambia)	Madeleine Akoumba Ze; Esther Mwansa	21; 3	21; 11
2	(Cameroon) (Zambia)	Maeva Anamba; Evelyn Siamupangila	21; 8	21; 8
3	(Cameroon) (Zambia)	Mado Promesse Ngo Hiol; Matildah Kalandanya	21; 14	21; 4
4	(Cameroon) (Zambia)	Madeleine Akoumba Ze / Maeva Anamba; Mary Chilambe / Evelyn Siamupangila	21; 9	21; 12
5	(Cameroon) (Zambia)	Praxede Reine Eunice Eyono / Mado Promesse Ngo Hiol; Matildah Kalandanya / Esther Mwansa	21; 11	21; 14

- Egypt vs Cameroon

Egypt
5
Royal Aria Indoor Hall, Court 2
10 February 2026, 15:00

Cameroon
0

			1	2	3
1	(Egypt) (Cameroon)	Nour Ahmed Youssri; Madeleine Akoumba Ze	21; 11	21; 16
2	(Egypt) (Cameroon)	Malayka Mohamed; Maeva Anamba	19; 21	21; 13	21; 7
3	(Egypt) (Cameroon)	Hana Tarek; Mado Promesse Ngo Hiol	21; 12	21; 7
4	(Egypt) (Cameroon)	Doha Hany / Hana Tarek; Madeleine Akoumba Ze / Maeva Anamba	21; 17	20; 22	21; 14
5	(Egypt) (Cameroon)	Ganna Elwazery / Fatema Rabie; Praxede Reine Eunice Eyono / Mado Promesse Ngo Hiol	21; 12	21; 15

==== Group C ====
Pos	Team	Pld	W	L	MF	MA	MD	GF	GA	GD	PF	PA	PD	Pts	Qualification
1	South Africa	2	2	0	8	2	+6	16	4	+12	396	204	+192	2	Knockout stage
2	Nigeria	2	1	1	7	3	+4	14	6	+8	369	240	+129	1	Knockout stage
3	Zimbabwe	2	0	2	0	10	−10	0	20	−20	99	420	−321	0	

Source: TS
- South Africa vs Zimbabwe

South Africa
5
Royal Aria Indoor Hall, Court 3
9 February 2026, 12:00

Zimbabwe
0

			1	2	3
1	(South Africa) (Zimbabwe)	Johanita Scholtz; Fabiana Layla Oliviero	21; 4	21; 3
2	(South Africa) (Zimbabwe)	Chloe Lai; Shalom Tapiwanashe Sibanda	21; 6	21; 8
3	(South Africa) (Zimbabwe)	Elme de Villiers; Valerie Tapiwa Samuriwo	21; 0	21; 3
4	(South Africa) (Zimbabwe)	Amy Ackerman / Johanita Scholtz; Fabiana Layla Oliviero / Shalom Tapiwanashe Sibanda	21; 9	21; 4
5	(South Africa) (Zimbabwe)	Elme De Villiers / Anri Schoonees; Valerie Tapiwa Samuriwo / Nicholine Tabile Sibanda	21; 6	21; 2

- Nigeria vs Zimbabwe

Nigeria
5
Royal Aria Indoor Hall, Court 3
10 February 2026, 12:00

Zimbabwe
0

			1	2	3
1	(Nigeria) (Zimbabwe)	Ruth Chinenye Ebere; Fabiana Layla Oliviero	21; 4	21; 3
2	(Nigeria) (Zimbabwe)	Sofiat Arinola Obanishola; Shalom Tapiwanashe Sibanda	21; 8	21; 4
3	(Nigeria) (Zimbabwe)	Zainab Damilola Alabi; Nicholine Tabile Sibanda	21; 4	21; 8
4	(Nigeria) (Zimbabwe)	Zainab Damilola Alabi / Sofiat Arinola Obanishola; Fabiana Layla Oliviero / Shalom Tapiwanashe Sibanda	21; 6	21; 6
5	(Nigeria) (Zimbabwe)	Ruth Chinenye Ebere / Olajumoke Obasanmi; Valerie Tapiwa Samuriwo / Nicholine Tabile Sibanda	21; 5	21; 6

- South Africa vs Nigeria

South Africa
3
Royal Aria Indoor Hall, Court 4
10 February 2026, 15:00

Nigeria
2

			1	2	3
1	(South Africa) (Nigeria)	Johanita Scholtz; Ruth Chinenye Ebere	21; 19	21; 17
2	(South Africa) (Nigeria)	Chloe Lai; Sofiat Arinola Obanishola	13; 21	14; 21
3	(South Africa) (Nigeria)	Elme de Villiers; Zainab Damilola Alabi	21; 9	21; 10
4	(South Africa) (Nigeria)	Amy Ackerman / Johanita Scholtz; Ruth Chinenye Ebere / Olajumoke Obasanmi	21; 5	21; 15
5	(South Africa) (Nigeria)	Elme de Villiers / Anri Schoonees; Zainab Damilola Alabi / Sofiat Arinola Obanishola	15; 21	18; 21

=== Knockout stage ===
==== Bracket ====
Quarter-finals
11 February 17:00
Egypt
Bye
11 February 17:00
Mauritius	0
Nigeria	3
11 February 17:00
Algeria	3
Cameroon	1
11 February 17:00
Bye
South Africa

Semi-finals
12 February 9:00
Egypt	3
Nigeria	0
12 February 9:00
Algeria	0
South Africa	3

Final
12 February 15:00
Egypt	1
South Africa	3

==== Quarter-finals ====
- Mauritius vs Nigeria

Mauritius
0
Royal Aria Indoor Hall, Court 1
11 February 2026, 13:30

Nigeria
3

			1	2	3
1	(Mauritius) (Nigeria)	Elsa How Hong; Ruth Chinenye Ebere	21; 8	14; 21	18; 21
2	(Mauritius) (Nigeria)	Chiara How Hong; Sofiat Arinola Obanishola	14; 21	21; 17	18; 21
3	(Mauritius) (Nigeria)	Layna Luxmi Chiniah; Zainab Damilola Alabi	18; 21	17; 21
4	(Mauritius) (Nigeria)	Chiara How Hong / Elsa How Hong; Ruth Chinenye Ebere / Olajumoke Obasanmi				not played
5	(Mauritius) (Nigeria)	Tiya Bhurtun / Layna Luxmi Chiniah; Zainab Damilola Alabi / Sofiat Arinola Obanishola				not played

- Algeria vs Cameroon

Algeria
3
Royal Aria Indoor Hall, Court 2
11 February 2026, 13:30

Cameroon
1

			1	2	3
1	(Algeria) (Cameroon)	Yasmina Chibah; Madeleine Akoumba Ze	14; 21	16; 21
2	(Algeria) (Cameroon)	Halla Bouksani; Maeva Anamba	21; 15	21; 10
3	(Algeria) (Cameroon)	Malak Ouchefoun; Mado Promesse Ngo Hiol	21; 9	21; 15
4	(Algeria) (Cameroon)	Yasmina Chibah / Linda Mazri; Praxede Reine Eunice Eyono / Mado Promesse Ngo Hiol	21; 9	21; 9
5	(Algeria) (Cameroon)	Sirine Ibrahim / Tanina Mammeri; Madeleine Akoumba Ze / Maeva Anamba				not played

==== Semi-finals ====
- Egypt vs Nigeria

Egypt
3
Royal Aria Indoor Hall, Court 3
12 February 2026, 09:00

Nigeria
0

			1	2	3
1	(Egypt) (Nigeria)	Nour Ahmed Youssri; Ruth Chinenye Ebere	21; 14	21; 12
2	(Egypt) (Nigeria)	Doha Hany; Sofiat Arinola Obanishola	21; 17	17; 21	21; 6
3	(Egypt) (Nigeria)	Fatema Rabie; Zainab Damilola Alabi	20; 22	21; 10	21; 14
4	(Egypt) (Nigeria)	Nour Ahmed Youssri / Doha Hany; Ruth Chinenye Ebere / Olajumoke Obasanmi				not played
5	(Egypt) (Nigeria)	Ganna Elwazery / Hana Tarek; Zainab Damilola Alabi / Sofiat Arinola Obanishola				not played

- Algeria vs South Africa

Algeria
0
Royal Aria Indoor Hall, Court 2
12 February 2026, 09:00

South Africa
3

			1	2	3
1	(Algeria) (South Africa)	Yasmina Chibah; Johanita Scholtz	10; 21	11; 21
2	(Algeria) (South Africa)	Halla Bouksani; Elme de Villiers	21; 18	16; 21	19; 21
3	(Algeria) (South Africa)	Malak Ouchefoun; Amy Ackerman	19; 21	13; 21
4	(Algeria) (South Africa)	Yasmina Chibah / Linda Mazri; Amy Ackerman / Johanita Scholtz				not played
5	(Algeria) (South Africa)	Sirine Ibrahim / Tanina Mammeri; Elme de Villiers / Anri Schoonees				not played

==== Final ====
- Egypt vs South Africa

Egypt
1
Royal Aria Indoor Hall, Court 1
12 February 2026, 15:00

South Africa
3

			1	2	3
1	(Egypt) (South Africa)	Nour Ahmed Youssri; Johanita Scholtz	21; 17	18; 21	18; 21
2	(Egypt) (South Africa)	Doha Hany; Elme de Villiers	17; 21	13; 21
3	(Egypt) (South Africa)	Fatema Rabie; Amy Ackerman	21; 19	21; 14
4	(Egypt) (South Africa)	Nour Ahmed Youssri / Doha Hany; Amy Ackerman / Johanita Scholtz	12; 21	14; 21
5	(Egypt) (South Africa)	Ganna Elwazery / Hana Tarek; Elme de Villiers / Anri Schoonees				not played

=== Final ranking ===
Pos	Team	Pld	W	L	Pts	MD	GD	PD	Final result
1st place, gold medalist(s)	South Africa	4	4	0	4	+11	+20	+248	Champions
2nd place, silver medalist(s)	Egypt	4	3	1	3	+11	+19	+270	Runners-up
3rd place, bronze medalist(s)	Algeria	5	3	2	3	+8	+18	+294	Eliminated in semi-finals
3rd place, bronze medalist(s)	Nigeria	4	2	2	2	+4	+8	+92	Eliminated in semi-finals
5	Mauritius	4	3	1	3	+8	+17	+272	Eliminated in quarter-finals
6	Cameroon	3	1	2	1	−2	−2	−13	Eliminated in quarter-finals
7	Botswana (H)	2	1	2	1	−5	−10	−91	Eliminated in group stage
8	Zambia	2	0	2	0	−10	−20	−278	Eliminated in group stage
9	Zimbabwe	2	0	2	0	−10	−20	−321	Eliminated in group stage
10	Lesotho	3	0	3	0	−15	−30	−473	Eliminated in group stage
