= West Asian Badminton Championships =

Badminton championships

The West Asian Badminton Championships are a series of badminton tournaments organized by the Badminton Asia governing body to crown the best senior and junior badminton players in West Asia.

== History ==
The championships were conceptualized by Badminton Asia to help improve the sport's popularity in West Asia. The first tournament was hosted in Beirut in 2018, where players in the West Asian region took part in U17 and U15 categories. The second edition of the youth championships was hosted in Amman, Jordan in 2019.

== Championships (U–23) ==
| Year | Edition | Host city | Host country | Events |
|---|---|---|---|---|
| 2025 | 1 | Erbil (1) | Iraq (1) | 6 |
| 2026 | 2 | Manama (1) | Bahrain (1) | 6 |

=== Previous winners ===
==== Individual competition ====
| Year | Men's singles | Women's singles | Men's doubles | Women's doubles | Mixed doubles |
|---|---|---|---|---|---|
| 2025 | (Bahrain) Sayed Ebrahim Hasan | (Jordan) Lamees Alkhateeb | (Lebanon) Christophe Abi Younes (Lebanon) Oliver Khoury | (Jordan) Maryam Abuarrah (Jordan) Lamees Alkhateeb | (Jordan) Saif Abu Eid (Jordan) Maryam Abuarrah |
| 2026 | (Saudi Arabia) Qahtan Al-Abidi | (Jordan) Lamees Alkhateeb | (Saudi Arabia) Qahtan Al-Abidi (Saudi Arabia) Fahad Al-Malki | (Jordan) Maryam Abuarrah (Jordan) Lamees Alkhateeb | (Jordan) Saif Abu Eid (Jordan) Maryam Abuarrah |

==== Team competition (2025–) ====
| Year | Mixed |
|---|---|
| 2025 | Iraq |
| 2026 | Jordan |

== Junior championships (U–19, U–18) ==
=== Location of the West Asian Junior Championships (U–19, U–18) ===
The table below gives an overview of all host cities and countries of the West Asian Junior Championships.

| Year | Edition | Host city | Host country | Events |
|---|---|---|---|---|
| 2026 | 1 | Manama (1) | Bahrain (1) | 6 |

=== Previous winners ===
==== Individual competition ====
| Year | Men's singles | Women's singles | Men's doubles | Women's doubles | Mixed doubles |
|---|---|---|---|---|---|
| 2026 | (Saudi Arabia) Alwathiq Al-Abidi | (Jordan) Maria Abuarrah | (Saudi Arabia) Alwathiq Al-Abidi (Saudi Arabia) Abdulaziz Al-Muqahwi | (Syria) Ranim Alhasbani (Syria) Fulla Alnajjar | (Jordan) Ismail Omar (Jordan) Maria Abuarrah |

==== Team competition ====
| Year | Mixed |
|---|---|
| 2026 | Syria |

== Youth Championships (U–17 & U–15) ==
=== Location of the West Asian Youth Championships (U–17 & U–15) ===
The table below gives an overview of all host cities and countries of the West Asian U–17 and U–15 Junior Championships.

| Year | Edition | Host city | Host country | Events |
|---|---|---|---|---|
| 2018 | 1 | Beirut (1) | Lebanon (1) | 12 |
| 2019 | 2 | Amman (1) | Jordan (1) | 12 |
| 2021 | 3 | Riffa (1) | Bahrain (1) | 12 |
| 2022 | 4 | Kuwait City (1) | Kuwait (1) | 12 |
| 2023 | 5 | Erbil (1) | Iraq (1) | 12 |
| 2024 | 6 | Muscat (1) | Oman (1) | 12 |
| 2025 | 7 | Erbil (2) | Iraq (2) | 12 |
| 2026 | 8 | Manama (1) | Bahrain (2) | 6 |

=== Previous winners ===
==== Individual competition U–17 ====
| Year | Men's singles | Women's singles | Men's doubles | Women's doubles | Mixed doubles |
|---|---|---|---|---|---|
| 2018 | (Iran) Nima Rostampourlagaldani | (Iran) Yeiganeh Seyedtafreshikhameneh | (Jordan) Izzeldeen Abuarrah (Jordan) Tareq Alhomsi | (Iran) Kimia Azadvari (Iran) Yeiganeh Seyedtafreshikhameneh | (Jordan) Izzeldeen Abuarrah (Jordan) Reem Allham |
| 2019 | (Iran) Nima Rostampourlagaldani | (Iran) Fatemeh Babaei | (Iran) Mohsen Masoumitabarzanjani (Iran) Nima Rostampourlagaldani | (Iran) Sareh Aminian (Iran) Fatemeh Babaei | (Jordan) Izzeldeen Abuarrah (Jordan) Wesam Hammoudeh |
| 2021 | (Jordan) Qusai Althawahreh | (Jordan) Lamees Alkhateeb | (Jordan) Saif Abu Eid (Jordan) Qusai Althawahreh | (Jordan) Lamees Alkhateeb (Jordan) Wesam Hammoudeh | (Jordan) Qusai Althawahreh (Jordan) Lamees Alkhateeb |
| 2022 | (Jordan) Ahmed Sweidan | (Jordan) Maryam Abuarrah | (Saudi Arabia) Fahad Al-Malki (Saudi Arabia) Yazan Saigh | (Jordan) Maryam Abuarrah (Jordan) Marah Omar | Not held |
| 2023 | (Jordan) Ahmed Sweidan | (Jordan) Marah Omar | (Syria) Albara Albarkho (Syria) Hussam Aldin Rae | (Jordan) Maryam Abuarrah (Jordan) Marah Omar | (Jordan) Ahmed Sweidan (Jordan) Maryam Abuarrah |
| 2024 | (Jordan) Ismail Omar | (Jordan) Maria Abuarrah | (Saudi Arabia) Alwathiq Al-Abidi (Saudi Arabia) Abdulaziz Al-Muqahwi | (Jordan) Maria Abuarrah (Jordan) Jana Osaileh | (Syria) Hussam Aldin Rae (Syria) Sanaa Alzoubi |
| 2025 | (Jordan) Ismail Omar | (Jordan) Maria Abuarrah | (Syria) Shadi Alansari (Syria) Mohamad Khaled Alrefaee | (Syria) Sanaa Alzoubi (Syria) Dania Kurdi | (Jordan) Ismail Omar (Jordan) Maria Abuarrah |
| 2026 | Not held | | | | |

==== Individual competition U–16 ====
| Year | Men's singles | Women's singles | Men's doubles | Women's doubles | Mixed doubles |
|---|---|---|---|---|---|
| 2026 | (Saudi Arabia) Yousef Falemban | (United Arab Emirates) Lujain Asem Abusalem | (Saudi Arabia) Abdullah Al-Abdullah (Saudi Arabia) Yousef Falemban | (United Arab Emirates) Lujain Asem Abusalem (United Arab Emirates) Dana Ahmad Mohammad | (Saudi Arabia) Yousef Falemban (Saudi Arabia) Hanin Fayz |

==== Individual competition U–15 ====
| Year | Men's singles | Women's singles | Men's doubles | Women's doubles | Mixed doubles |
|---|---|---|---|---|---|
| 2018 | (Iran) Ali Hayati | (Iran) Fatemeh Mouneskhah | (Iran) Ali Hayati (Iran) Mohammad Zarchi | (Iran) Fatemeh Babaei (Iran) Fatemeh Mouneskhah | (Syria) Mostafa Habosh (Syria) Yara Alssawas |
| 2019 | (Iran) Ali Hayati | (Iran) Maryam Soltani | (Iran) Mohammadparsa Alvandi (Iran) Ali Hayati | (Iran) Mobina Nedaei (Iran) Maryam Soltani | (Jordan) Qusai Althawahreh (Jordan) Lamees Alkhateeb |
| 2021 | (Jordan) Ahmed Sweidan | (Jordan) Maryam Abuarrah | (Jordan) Ismail Omar (Jordan) Ahmed Sweidan | (Jordan) Maryam Abuarrah (Jordan) Marah Omar | (Jordan) Ahmed Sweidan (Jordan) Marah Omar |
| 2022 | (Jordan) Ismail Omar | (Jordan) Maria Abuarrah | (Syria) Albara Albarkho (Syria) Hussam Aldin Rae | (Jordan) Maria Abuarrah (Jordan) Jana Osaileh | Not held |
| 2023 | (Syria) Shadi Alansari | (Syria) Mayas Kabbani | (Syria) Shadi Alansari (Syria) Mohamad Khaled Alrefaee | (Syria) Sanaa Alzoubi (Syria) Mayas Kabbani | (Syria) Mohamad Khaled Alrefaee (Syria) Sanaa Alzoubi |
| 2024 | (Saudi Arabia) Rayan Al-Mukhimer | (Syria) Mayas Kabbani | (Syria) Mohamad Khaled Alrefaee (Syria) Abdulrahman Kabbani | (Syria) Mayas Kabbani (Syria) Leen Shakerdi | (Saudi Arabia) Rayan Al-Mukhimer (Saudi Arabia) Albatul Al-Mutairi |
| 2025 | (Iraq) Ammar Taher | (Syria) Mayas Kabbani | (Iraq) Yousif Hamedi (Iraq) Ammar Taher | (Iraq) Baneen Abdulrazzaq (Iraq) Farah Mahdi | (Iraq) Ammar Taher (Iraq) Baneen Abdulrazzaq |
| 2026 | Not held | | | | |

==== Team competition U–17 ====
| Year | Mixed |
|---|---|
| 2022 | Cancelled |
| 2023 | Cancelled |
| 2024 | Syria |
| 2025 | Lebanon |

==== Team competition U–16 ====
| Year | Mixed |
|---|---|
| 2026 | United Arab Emirates |

==== Team competition U–15 ====
| Year | Mixed |
|---|---|
| 2022 | Cancelled |
| 2023 | Cancelled |
| 2024 | Saudi Arabia |
| 2025 | Iraq |

== See also ==
- Badminton Asia Championships
