= Palestine national badminton team =

National badminton team representing Palestine

Palestine
- Association: Palestine Badminton Federation (PBF)
- Confederation: BA (Asia)
- President: Yagoub Al-Eissa

BWF ranking
- Current ranking: Unranked (2 January 2024)
- Highest ranking: Unranked

The Palestine national badminton team (Arabic: منتخب فلسطين للريشة الطائرة) represents Palestine in international badminton team competitions. The national team is controlled by the Palestine Badminton Federation. Badminton in Palestine has been played since the 1990s when Syria brought its badminton influence into the Arab world.

Palestine is also one of the main founding nations of the Arab Badminton Federation which was formed in 1996. The nation competed in the inaugural Arab Badminton Championships shortly after the formation of the Arab Badminton Federation.

Palestine also competes in the Arab Junior Badminton Championships.

== History ==
Following the formation of the Syria Arab Badminton Association in 1985, badminton started to make its way into the Arab world. This led to the formation of the Palestine Badminton Federation. The country then started to take part in regional tournaments.

=== Men's team ===
Palestine made their debut in competitive badminton at the 1996 Arab Badminton Championships and finished in fifth place in the men's team event. The team then withdrew from the 2002 Arab Badminton Championships. In the sixth edition of the championships in 2009, Palestine were grouped with hosts Jordan, Egypt and Iraq in Group A in the men's team event. The team started off with a 3–0 loss to Jordan. The team finished at the bottom of the group after losing their next matches 3–0 to Egypt and Iraq.

In 2011, Palestine placed fifth in the men's team round robin event at the 2011 Arab Badminton Championships after losing 5–0 to Jordan, Syria and Iraq.

=== Women's team ===
The Palestinian women's team lost 3–0 to Jordan. The team then competed in the 2011 Arab Badminton Championships women's team event. The team lost all their matches to Jordan, Syria and Iraq. The team finished fifth in the event.

== Competitive record ==
=== Thomas Cup ===
Year	Round	Pos
1949	Did not enter	
1952	Did not enter	
1955	Did not enter	
1958	Did not enter	
1961	Did not enter	
1964	Did not enter	
1967	Did not enter	
1970	Did not enter	
1973	Did not enter	
1976	Did not enter	
1979	Did not enter	
1982	Did not enter	
1984	Did not enter	
1986	Did not enter	
1988	Did not enter	
1990	Did not enter	
1992	Did not enter	
1994	Did not enter	
1996	Did not enter	
1998	Did not enter	
2000	Did not enter	
2002	Did not enter	
2004	Did not enter	
2006	Did not enter	
2008	Did not enter	
2010	Did not enter	
2012	Did not enter	
2014	Did not enter	
2016	Did not enter	
2018	Did not enter	
2020	Did not enter	
2022	Did not enter	
2024	Did not enter	
2026	TBD	
2028	TBD	
2030	TBD	

=== Uber Cup ===
Year	Round	Pos
1957	Did not enter	
1960	Did not enter	
1963	Did not enter	
1966	Did not enter	
1969	Did not enter	
1972	Did not enter	
1975	Did not enter	
1978	Did not enter	
1981	Did not enter	
1984	Did not enter	
1986	Did not enter	
1988	Did not enter	
1990	Did not enter	
1992	Did not enter	
1994	Did not enter	
1996	Did not enter	
1998	Did not enter	
2000	Did not enter	
2002	Did not enter	
2004	Did not enter	
2006	Did not enter	
2008	Did not enter	
2010	Did not enter	
2012	Did not enter	
2014	Did not enter	
2016	Did not enter	
2018	Did not enter	
2020	Did not enter	
2022	Did not enter	
2024	Did not enter	
2026	TBD	
2028	TBD	
2030	TBD	

=== Sudirman Cup ===
Year	Round	Pos
1989	Did not enter	
1991	Did not enter	
1993	Did not enter	
1995	Did not enter	
1997	Did not enter	
1999	Did not enter	
2001	Did not enter	
2003	Did not enter	
2005	Did not enter	
2007	Did not enter	
2009	Did not enter	
2011	Did not enter	
2013	Did not enter	
2015	Did not enter	
2017	Did not enter	
2019	Did not enter	
2021	Did not enter	
2023	Did not enter	
2025	TBD	
2027	TBD	
2029	TBD	

=== Asian Games ===
==== Men's team ====
Year	Round	Pos
1962	Did not enter	
1966	Did not enter	
1970	Did not enter	
1974	Did not enter	
1978	Did not enter	
1982	Did not enter	
1986	Did not enter	
1990	Did not enter	
1994	Did not enter	
1998	Did not enter	
2002	Did not enter	
2006	Did not enter	
2010	Did not enter	
2014	Did not enter	
2018	Did not enter	
2022	Did not enter	
2026	TBD	
2030	TBD	
2034	TBD	
2038	TBD	

==== Women's team ====
Year	Round	Pos
1962	Did not enter	
1966	Did not enter	
1970	Did not enter	
1974	Did not enter	
1978	Did not enter	
1982	Did not enter	
1986	Did not enter	
1990	Did not enter	
1994	Did not enter	
1998	Did not enter	
2002	Did not enter	
2006	Did not enter	
2010	Did not enter	
2014	Did not enter	
2018	Did not enter	
2022	Did not enter	
2026	TBD	
2030	TBD	
2034	TBD	
2038	TBD	

=== Asian Team Championships ===
==== Men's team ====
Year	Round	Pos
1962	Did not enter	
1965	Did not enter	
1969	Did not enter	
1971	Did not enter	
1976	Did not enter	
1983	Did not enter	
1985	Did not enter	
1987	Did not enter	
1989	Did not enter	
1993	Did not enter	
2004	Did not enter	
2006	Did not enter	
2008	Did not enter	
2010	Did not enter	
2012	Did not enter	
2016	Did not enter	
2018	Did not enter	
2020	Did not enter	
2022	Did not enter	
2024	Did not enter	
2026	TBD	
2028	TBD	
2030	TBD	

==== Women's team ====
Year	Round	Pos
2004	Did not enter	
2006	Did not enter	
2008	Did not enter	
2010	Did not enter	
2012	Did not enter	
2016	Did not enter	
2018	Did not enter	
2020	Did not enter	
2022	Did not enter	
2024	Did not enter	
2026	TBD	
2028	TBD	
2030	TBD	

==== Mixed team ====
Year	Round	Pos
2017	Did not enter	
2019	Did not enter	
2023	Did not enter	
2025	TBD	
2027	TBD	
2029	TBD	

=== Arab Games ===
==== Men's team ====
Year	Round	Pos
1999	Did not enter	
2004	Did not enter	
2007	Did not enter	

==== Women's team ====
Year	Round	Pos
1999	Did not enter	
2004	Did not enter	
2007	Did not enter	

=== Arab Team Championships ===
==== Men's team ====
Year	Round	Pos
1996	Fifth place	5th
1998	Fifth place	5th
2000	Group stage	7th
2002	Group stage	7th
2004	Did not enter	
2009	Group stage	8th
2011	Fifth place	5th
2017	Did not enter	
2024	TBD	

==== Women's team ====
Year	Round	Pos
1996	Fifth place	5th
1998	Fifth place	5th
2000	Group stage	7th
2002	Group stage	6th
2004	Did not enter	
2009	Group stage	7th
2011	Fifth place	5th
2017	Did not enter	
2024	TBD	

**Red border color indicates tournament was held on home soil.

== Junior competitive record ==
=== Suhandinata Cup ===
Year	Round	Pos
2000	Did not enter	
2002	Did not enter	
2004	Did not enter	
2006	Did not enter	
2007	Did not enter	
2008	Did not enter	
2009	Did not enter	
2010	Did not enter	
2011	Did not enter	
2012	Did not enter	
2013	Did not enter	
2014	Did not enter	
2015	Did not enter	
2016	Did not enter	
2017	Did not enter	
2018	Did not enter	
2019	Did not enter	
2022	Did not enter	
2023	Did not enter	
2024	TBD	

=== Asian Junior Team Championships ===
==== Boys' team ====
Year	Round	Pos
1997	Did not enter	
1998	Did not enter	
1999	Did not enter	
2000	Did not enter	
2001	Did not enter	
2002	Did not enter	
2004	Did not enter	
2005	Did not enter	

==== Girls' team ====
Year	Round	Pos
1997	Did not enter	
1998	Did not enter	
1999	Did not enter	
2000	Did not enter	
2001	Did not enter	
2002	Did not enter	
2004	Did not enter	
2005	Did not enter	

==== Mixed team ====
Year	Round	Pos
2006	Did not enter	
2007	Did not enter	
2008	Did not enter	
2009	Did not enter	
2010	Did not enter	
2011	Did not enter	
2012	Did not enter	
2013	Did not enter	
2014	Did not enter	
2015	Did not enter	
2016	Did not enter	
2017	Did not enter	
2018	Did not enter	
2019	Did not enter	
2023	Did not enter	
2024	TBD	
2025	TBD	

=== Arab Junior Team Championships ===
==== Men's team ====
Year	Round	Pos
2003	Did not enter	
2005	Did not enter	
2007	Did not enter	
2009	Sixth place	6th
2016	Did not enter	

==== Women's team ====
Year	Round	Pos
2003	Did not enter	
2005	Did not enter	
2007	Did not enter	
2009	Fifth place	5th
2016	Did not enter	

**Red border color indicates tournament was held on home soil.

== Players ==
=== Current squad ===
As of 2 January 2024

==== Men's team ====
Name	DoB/Age	Ranking of event		
Name	DoB/Age	MS	MD	XD
Mohammad Jalamneh	2008 (age 16–17)	–	–	–
Ibrahim Kanan	2008 (age 16–17)	–	–	–

==== Women's team ====
Name	DoB/Age	Ranking of event		
Name	DoB/Age	WS	WD	XD
Marwa Abujaza	2006 (age 18–19)	–	–	–
Mariam Abujaza	2009 (age 15–16)	–	–	–
