= 2024 Uber Cup qualification =

Tournament details
- Dates: 12 – 18 February 2024
- Venue: BA: Setia City Convention Centre; BCA: Cairo Stadium Hall 4 BE: Sport Arena in Łódź; BO: Badminton Geelong; BPA: Centro Paralimpico Brasilero
- Location: BA: Selangor, Malaysia; BCA: Cairo, Egypt; BE: Łódź, Poland; BO: Geelong, Australia; BPA: São Paulo, Brazil

The 2024 Uber Cup qualification process is a series of tournaments organised by the five BWF confederations to decide 14 of the 16 teams which will play in the 2024 Uber Cup, with China qualifying automatically as hosts, South Korea qualifying automatically as trophy holder.

== Qualification process ==
The number of teams participating in the final tournament is 16. The allocation of slots for each confederation is the same allocation from 2016 tournament; 4 from each Asia and Europe, and 1 from each Africa, Oceania and Pan Am. Two automatic qualifiers are the host and defending champion. The remaining quota will be filled by world team ranking.

=== Qualified teams ===
Country	Confederation	Qualified as	Qualified on	World Team Rankings	Final appearance
China	Badminton Asia	Host country	28 November 2021	1	21st
South Korea	Badminton Asia	2022 Uber Cup winners	14 May 2022	2	21st
South Africa	Badminton Africa	2024 All Africa Championships winners	15 February 2024	38	6th
India	Badminton Asia	2024 Asia Championships winner	18 February 2024	7	9th
Thailand	Badminton Asia	2024 Asia Championships runner-up	18 February 2024	4	9th
Indonesia	Badminton Asia	2024 Asia Championships semifinalists	17 February 2024	5	27th
Japan	Badminton Asia	2024 Asia Championships semifinalists	17 February 2024	3	21st
Canada	Badminton Pan Am	2024 Pan Am Cup winners	18 February 2024	11	14th
Denmark	Badminton Europe	2024 European Championships winner	18 February 2024	8	23rd
Spain	Badminton Europe	2024 European Championships runner-up	18 February 2024	12	4th
France	Badminton Europe	2024 European Championships semifinalists	17 February 2024	13	4th
Scotland	Badminton Europe	2024 European Championships semifinalists	17 February 2024	21	2nd
Australia	Badminton Oceania	2024 Oceania Championships	18 February 2022	17	10th
Chinese Taipei	Badminton Asia	Best ranking (overall)	20 February 2024	7	15th
United States	Badminton Pan Am	Best ranking (overall)	20 February 2024	9	13th
Malaysia	Badminton Asia	Best ranking (overall)	20 February 2024	10	9th

== Confederation qualification ==
=== Badminton Confederation of Africa ===
The qualification for the African teams was held from 12 to 15 February 2024, at the Cairo Stadium Hall 4, in Cairo, Egypt. The winners of the African qualification will qualified for the Thomas Cup.

==== Teams in contention ====
Teams qualified for the Group stage

- Algeria
- Cameroon
- Egypt
- Mauritius
- Nigeria
- South Africa
- Uganda

==== First round (group stage) ====
Advance to Knockout stage

Group A

Pos	Team	Pld	Pts
1	South Africa	3	3
2	Algeria	3	2
3	Mauritius	3	1
4	Cameroon	3	0

Source: TS
Group B

Pos	Team	Pld	Pts
1	Uganda	2	2
2	Nigeria	2	1
3	Egypt (H)	2	0

Source: TS
(H) Host

==== Second round (knockout stage) ====
Semi-finals
14 February 14:00
South Africa	3
Nigeria	2
14 February 14:00
Algeria	0
Uganda	3

Final
15 February 15:00
South Africa	3
Uganda	2

=== Badminton Asia ===
The qualification for the Asian teams was held from 18 to 20 February 2024, at the Setia City Convention Centre in Shah Alam, Selangor, Malaysia. The semifinalist of the Asian qualification will qualified for the Thomas Cup. South Korea did not participate the qualification championships.

==== Teams in contention ====
Teams qualified for the Group stage

- China
- Chinese Taipei
- Hong Kong
- India
- Indonesia
- Japan
- Kazakhstan
- Malaysia
- Singapore
- Thailand
- United Arab Emirates

==== First round (group stage) ====
Advance to Knockout stage

Group W
Group X

Pos	Team	Pld	Pts
1	India	1	1
2	China	1	0

Pos	Team	Pld	Pts
1	Indonesia	2	2
2	Hong Kong	2	1
3	Kazakhstan	2	0

Group Y
Group Z

Pos	Team	Pld	Pts
1	Thailand	2	2
2	Malaysia	2	1
3	United Arab Emirates	2	0

Pos	Team	Pld	Pts
1	Japan	2	2
2	Chinese Taipei	2	1
3	Singapore	2	0

==== Second round (knockout stage) ====
Quarter-finals
16 February 10:00
Japan (2)	3
China (1)	2
16 February 10:00
India	3
Hong Kong	0
16 February 10:00
Malaysia	0
Indonesia (4)	3
16 February 10:00
Chinese Taipei	1
Thailand (3)	3

Semi-finals
17 February 10:00
Japan (2)	2
India	3
17 February 10:00
Indonesia (4)	1
Thailand (3)	3

Final
18 February 10:00
India	3
Thailand (3)	2

=== Badminton Europe ===
The qualification for the European teams was held from 14 to 18 February 2024, at the Sport Arena Łódź in Łódź, Poland. The semifinalist of the European qualification will qualified for the Thomas Cup.

==== Teams in contention ====
Teams qualified for the Group stage

- Denmark
- France
- Germany
- Netherlands
- Poland
- Scotland
- Spain
- Turkey

Teams failed to qualify for the Group stage

- Azerbaijan
- Belgium
- Bulgaria
- Czech Republic
- England
- Estonia
- Finland
- Greenland
- Hungary
- Iceland
- Ireland
- Italy
- Latvia
- Luxembourg
- Portugal
- Slovakia
- Slovenia
- Sweden
- Switzerland
- Ukraine

==== First round (group stage) ====
Advance to Knockout stage

Group 1

Pos	Team	Pld	Pts
1	Denmark	3	3
2	France	3	2
3	Turkey	3	1
4	Poland (H)	3	0

Source: TS
(H) Host
Group 2

Pos	Team	Pld	Pts
1	Spain	3	3
2	Scotland	3	2
3	Germany	3	1
4	Netherlands	3	0

Source: TS

==== Second round (knockout stage) ====
Semi-finals
17 February 10:00
Denmark	3
France	1
17 February 10:00
Scotland	0
Spain	3

Final
18 February 10:00
Denmark	3
Spain	1

=== Badminton Oceania ===
The qualification for the Oceanian teams was held from 16 to 18 February 2024, at the Badminton Geelong in Geelong, Australia. The winner of the Oceania qualification qualified for the Thomas Cup.

==== Teams in contention ====
- Australia
- Cook Islands
- New Zealand
- Tahiti

==== Round-robin ====
Pos	Team	Pld	W	L	MF	MA	MD	GF	GA	GD	PF	PA	PD	Pts	Qualification
1	Australia (H)	3	3	0	15	0	+15	30	1	+29	648	290	+358	3	Uber Cup
2	New Zealand	3	2	1	10	5	+5	21	10	+11	571	405	+166	2	
3	Tahiti	3	1	2	5	10	−5	10	21	−11	426	560	−134	1	
4	Cook Islands	3	0	3	0	15	−15	1	30	−29	259	649	−390	0	

Source: TS
(H) Host

=== Badminton Pan Am ===
The qualification for the Pan Am teams was held from 15 to 18 February 2024, at the Centro Paralimpico Brasílero in São Paulo, Brazil. The winner of the Pan Am qualification will qualified for the Uber Cup.

==== Teams in contention ====
Teams qualified for the Group stage

- Brazil
- Canada
- El Salvador
- Mexico
- Peru
- United States

==== First round (group stage) ====
Advance to Semi-finals

Group A

Pos	Team	Pld	Pts
1	United States	2	2
2	Peru	2	1
3	Mexico	2	0

Source: TS
Group B

Pos	Team	Pld	Pts
1	Canada	2	2
2	Brazil (H)	2	1
3	El Salvador	2	0

Source: TS
(H) Host

==== Second round (knockout stage) ====
Semi-finals
16 February
United States	3
Brazil	0
16 February
Peru	0
Canada	3

Final
17 February
United States	0
Canada	3
Third place
17 February
Brazil	3
Peru	0

== World team rankings ==
Below is the chart of the BWF World Team Ranking calculated by adding World Ranking points of top three Women's Singles players and top two Women's Doubles pairs on 20 February 2024.

Key

- QS – Qualification stage
- GS – Group stage
- SG – Subgroup

Rank	Conf.	Nation	Points	Continental results	Host	Title holder	Continental qualifier	Ranking qualifier
1	BA	China	445,941	Quarter-finalist	Host			
2	BA	South Korea	396,109	absent		Holder		
3	BA	Japan	370,651	Semi-finalist			Asia	
4	BA	Thailand	305,449	Finalist			Asia	
5	BA	Indonesia	278,309	Semi-finalist			Asia	
6	BA	Chinese Taipei	271,956	Quarter-finalist				World ranking
7	BA	India	222,135	Winner			Asia	
8	BE	Denmark	208,672	Winner			Europe	
9	BPA	United States	207,737	2nd place				World ranking
10	BA	Malaysia	190,777	Quarter-finalist				World ranking
11	BPA	Canada	161,214	Winner			Pan America	
12	BE	Spain	150,255	Finalist			Europe	
13	BE	France	141,327	Semi-finalist			Europe	
14	BA	Hong Kong	137,304	Quarter-finalist				
15	BE	Germany	123,311	3rd in GS				
16	BA	Singapore	113,013	3rd in GS				
17	BO	Australia	106,940	Winner			Oceania	
18	BPA	Mexico	106,159	5th place				
19	BPA	Brazil	103,302	3rd place				
20	BE	Bulgaria	99,411	QS finalist				
21	BE	Scotland	97,735	Semi-finalist			Europe	
22	BE	England	89,978	2nd in QS GS				
23	BE	Netherlands	85,961	4th in GS				
25	BPA	Peru	78,874	4th place				
26	BE	Turkey	72,640	3rd in GS				
27	BCA	Uganda	71,620	Finalist				
28	BE	Estonia	69,450	2nd in QS GS				
29	BE	Czech Republic	60,946	2nd in QS SG				
30	BE	Switzerland	59,138	2nd in QS GS				
31	BE	Hungary	57,507	QS finalist				
32	BE	Italy	55,477	3rd in QS GS				
34	BE	Poland	49,102	4th in GS				
35	BE	Azerbaijan	48,705	3rd in QS GS				
36	BA	United Arab Emirates	48,444	3rd in GS				
37	BE	Sweden	48,249	2nd in QS GS				
38	BCA	South Africa	47,548	Winner			Africa	
39	BE	Belgium	47,028	3rd in QS GS				
40	BE	Ukraine	46,986	2nd in QS SG				
41	BE	Ireland	43,958	2nd in QS SG				
42	BCA	Mauritius	41,767	3rd in GS				
44	BE	Israel	38,122	3rd in QS SG				
45	BPA	El Salvador	37,833	6th place				
46	BCA	Egypt	36,251	3rd in GS				
48	BCA	Algeria	31,544	Semi-finalist				
53	BO	New Zealand	20,482	2nd place				
54	BE	Slovenia	20,094	4th in QS GS				
55	BCA	Nigeria	19,916	Semi-finalist				
56	BA	Kazakhstan	19,889	3rd in GS				
60	BE	Luxembourg	17,211	4th in QS GS				
62	BE	Slovakia	16,023	4th in QS GS				
67	BE	Latvia	15,002	3rd in QS SG				
68	BE	Portugal	14,890	2nd in QS SG				
72	BCA	Cameroon	10,846	4th in GS				
77	BE	Finland	7,787	3rd in QS SG				
93	BO	Tahiti	2,922	3rd place				
103	BO	Cook Islands	1,644	4th place				
114	BE	Greenland	20	3rd in QS SG				
