= Bahrain national badminton team =

National badminton team

Bahrain
- Association: Bahrain Badminton & Squash Federation (BBSF)
- Confederation: BA (Asia)
- President: Sawsan Haji Taqawi

BWF ranking
- Current ranking: 51 ▲6 (2 January 2024)
- Highest ranking: 51 (2 January 2024)

Asian Mixed Team Championships
- Appearances: 1 (first in 2023)
- Best result: Group stage

Asian Men's Team Championships
- Appearances: 1 (first in 1985)
- Best result: Round of 16 (1985)

The Bahrain national badminton team (Arabic: منتخب البحرين لكرة الريشة) represents Bahrain in international badminton team competitions. The Bahrain Badminton & Squash Federation organizes any event or national event in the national team. Bahrain have competed in badminton at the Asian Games. The Bahrain team have also competed in the Pan Arab Games. The team won two bronzes.

== History ==
Badminton first started in Bahrain in the 1930s, when the sport was played in private clubs. Bahrain started sending its athletes to compete in international tournaments in the 1980s. In the late 1990s, the team started competing the Pan Arab Games.

=== Men's team ===
The men's team first competed in the 1999 Pan Arab Games. The team competed for the next two editions of the Games in 2004 and 2007 but did not achieve a podium finish.

=== Mixed team ===
The mixed team made their debut at the 2023 Badminton Asia Mixed Team Championships. The team lost 0–5 to Indonesia and Thailand. The team managed to finish third in the group after prevailing against Lebanon and winning closely against Syria.

== Competitive record ==
=== Thomas Cup ===
Year	Round	Pos
1949	Part of the United Kingdom	
1952	Part of the United Kingdom	
1955	Part of the United Kingdom	
1958	Part of the United Kingdom	
1961	Part of the United Kingdom	
1964	Part of the United Kingdom	
1967	Part of the United Kingdom	
1970	Part of the United Kingdom	
1973	Did not enter	
1976	Did not enter	
1979	Did not enter	
1982	Did not enter	
1984	Did not enter	
1986	Did not enter	
1988	Did not enter	
1990	Did not enter	
1992	Did not enter	
1994	Did not enter	
1996	Did not enter	
1998	Did not enter	
2000	Did not enter	
2002	Did not enter	
2004	Did not enter	
2006	Did not enter	
2008	Did not enter	
2010	Did not enter	
2012	Did not enter	
2014	Did not enter	
2016	Did not enter	
2018	Did not enter	
2020	Did not enter	
2022	Did not enter	
2024	TBD	
2026	TBD	
2028	TBD	
2030	TBD	

=== Uber Cup ===
Year	Round	Pos
1957	Part of the United Kingdom	
1960	Part of the United Kingdom	
1963	Part of the United Kingdom	
1966	Part of the United Kingdom	
1969	Part of the United Kingdom	
1972	Did not enter	
1975	Did not enter	
1978	Did not enter	
1981	Did not enter	
1984	Did not enter	
1986	Did not enter	
1988	Did not enter	
1990	Did not enter	
1992	Did not enter	
1994	Did not enter	
1996	Did not enter	
1998	Did not enter	
2000	Did not enter	
2002	Did not enter	
2004	Did not enter	
2006	Did not enter	
2008	Did not enter	
2010	Did not enter	
2012	Did not enter	
2014	Did not enter	
2016	Did not enter	
2018	Did not enter	
2020	Did not enter	
2022	Did not enter	
2024	TBD	
2026	TBD	
2028	TBD	
2030	TBD	

=== Sudirman Cup ===
Year	Round	Pos
1989	Did not enter	
1991	Did not enter	
1993	Did not enter	
1995	Did not enter	
1997	Did not enter	
1999	Did not enter	
2001	Did not enter	
2003	Did not enter	
2005	Did not enter	
2007	Did not enter	
2009	Did not enter	
2011	Did not enter	
2013	Did not enter	
2015	Did not enter	
2017	Did not enter	
2019	Did not enter	
2021	Did not enter	
2023	Did not qualify	
2025	TBD	
2027	TBD	
2029	TBD	

=== Asian Games ===
==== Men's team ====
Year	Round	Pos
1962	Part of the United Kingdom	
1966	Part of the United Kingdom	
1970	Part of the United Kingdom	
1974	Did not enter	
1978	Did not enter	
1982	Did not enter	
1986	Did not enter	
1990	Did not enter	
1994	Did not enter	
1998	Did not enter	
2002	Did not enter	
2006	Did not enter	
2010	Did not enter	
2014	Did not enter	
2018	Did not enter	
2022	Did not enter	
2026	TBD	
2030	TBD	
2034	TBD	
2038	TBD	

==== Women's team ====
Year	Round	Pos
1962	Part of the United Kingdom	
1966	Part of the United Kingdom	
1970	Part of the United Kingdom	
1974	Did not enter	
1978	Did not enter	
1982	Did not enter	
1986	Did not enter	
1990	Did not enter	
1994	Did not enter	
1998	Did not enter	
2002	Did not enter	
2006	Did not enter	
2010	Did not enter	
2014	Did not enter	
2018	Did not enter	
2022	Did not enter	
2026	TBD	
2030	TBD	
2034	TBD	
2038	TBD	

=== Asian Team Championships ===
==== Men's team ====
Year	Round	Pos
1962	Part of the United Kingdom	
1965	Part of the United Kingdom	
1969	Part of the United Kingdom	
1971	Part of the United Kingdom	
1976	Did not enter	
1983	Did not enter	
1985	Round of 16	
1987	Did not enter	
1989	Did not enter	
1993	Did not enter	
2004	Did not enter	
2006	Did not enter	
2008	Did not enter	
2010	Did not enter	
2012	Did not enter	
2016	Did not enter	
2018	Did not enter	
2020	Did not enter	
2022	Did not enter	
2024	TBD	
2026	TBD	
2028	TBD	
2030	TBD	

==== Women's team ====
Year	Round	Pos
2004	Did not enter	
2006	Did not enter	
2008	Did not enter	
2010	Did not enter	
2012	Did not enter	
2016	Did not enter	
2018	Did not enter	
2020	Did not enter	
2022	Did not enter	
2024	TBD	
2026	TBD	
2028	TBD	
2030	TBD	

==== Mixed team ====
Year	Round	Pos
2017	Did not enter	
2019	Did not enter	
2023	Group stage	9th
2025	TBD	
2027	TBD	
2029	TBD	

=== Arab Games ===
==== Men's team ====
Year	Round	Pos
1999	3rd / 4th in group	4th
2004	Did not enter	
2007	Fifth place	5th

==== Women's team ====
Year	Round	Pos
1999	3rd / 4th in group	3rd
2004	Did not enter	
2007	Did not enter	

**Red border color indicates tournament was held on home soil.

== Junior competitive record ==
=== Suhandinata Cup ===
Year	Round	Pos
2000	Did not enter	
2002	Did not enter	
2004	Did not enter	
2006	Did not enter	
2007	Did not enter	
2008	Did not enter	
2009	Did not enter	
2010	Did not enter	
2011	Did not enter	
2012	Did not enter	
2013	Did not enter	
2014	Did not enter	
2015	Did not enter	
2016	Did not enter	
2017	Did not enter	
2018	Did not enter	
2019	Did not enter	
2022	Did not enter	
2023	Did not enter	
2024	TBD	

=== Asian Junior Team Championships ===
==== Boys' team ====
Year	Round	Pos
1997	Did not enter	
1998	Did not enter	
1999	Did not enter	
2000	Did not enter	
2001	Did not enter	
2002	Did not enter	
2004	Did not enter	
2005	Did not enter	

==== Girls' team ====
Year	Round	Pos
1997	Did not enter	
1998	Did not enter	
1999	Did not enter	
2000	Did not enter	
2001	Did not enter	
2002	Did not enter	
2004	Did not enter	
2005	Did not enter	

==== Mixed team ====
Year	Round	Pos
2006	Did not enter	
2007	Did not enter	
2008	Did not enter	
2009	Did not enter	
2010	Did not enter	
2011	Did not enter	
2012	Did not enter	
2013	Did not enter	
2014	Did not enter	
2015	Did not enter	
2016	Did not enter	
2017	Did not enter	
2018	Did not enter	
2019	Did not enter	
2023	Did not enter	
2024	TBD	
2025	TBD	

**Red border color indicates tournament was held on home soil.

== Staff ==
The following list shows the coaching staff for the national badminton team of Bahrain.

Name	Role
(Bahrain) Ahmed Aljallad	Coach
(Bahrain) Abdul Rahman Abbasi	Coach

== Players ==
=== Current squad ===
As of 2 January 2024

==== Men's team ====
Name	DoB/Age	Ranking of event		
Name	DoB/Age	MS	MD	XD
Adnan Ebrahim	3 July 1998 (age 27)	280	1071	–
Jaffar Ebrahim	27 November 2005 (age 19)	–	–	–
Mohamed Muanis	26 December 1999 (age 25)	–	1071	–
Ahmed Hasan	11 September 2006 (age 19)	–	–	–
Yusuf Al-Mutawa	3 May 2006 (age 19)	–	–	–
Sayed Ebrahim Hasan	12 November 2008 (age 17)	996	455	–
Nasser Al-Nakkas	16 April 2007 (age 18)	1039	455	–
saurabh singh	25 December 1999 (age 25)	871	649	–

==== Women's team ====
Name	DoB/Age	Ranking of event		
Name	DoB/Age	WS	WD	XD
Lizbeth Elsa Binu	12 August 2003 (age 22)	483	–	–
Reya Fathima	10 October 2001 (age 24)	–	–	–
Maryam Saleh	17 March 2005 (age 20)	–	–	–
Dalal Al-Hamad	26 May 2005 (age 20)	–	–	–
Shahd Al-Anezi	19 June 2008 (age 17)	–	–	–
Rehana Sunder	1990 (age 34–35)	–	–	–
Thanvi Jeyashankar	17 August 2005 (age 20)	–	–	–
Sushmita Kolloju	15 November 2007 (age 18)	–	–	–

=== Previous squads ===
==== Asian Team Championships ====
- Mixed team: 2023

==== Pan Arab Games ====
- Men's team: 2007
