= Lebanon national badminton team =

National badminton team of Lebanon

Lebanon
- Association: Federation Libanaise de Badminton (FLB)
- Confederation: BA (Asia)
- President: Jassem Kanso

BWF ranking
- Current ranking: Unranked
- Highest ranking: Unranked

Asian Mixed Team Championships
- Appearances: 1 (first in 2023)
- Best result: Group stage

The Lebanon national badminton team (Arabic: فريق كرة الريشة اللبناني) represents Lebanon in international badminton team competitions. The national team is controlled by the Lebanon Badminton Federation, the governing body for badminton in Lebanon. The Lebanese team made their international team debut at the 2023 Badminton Asia Mixed Team Championships.

The Lebanese junior team also competes in the Mediterranean Badminton Championships.

== History ==
The Lebanese badminton team formed on 28 April 1993 after the establishment of the Lebanon Badminton Federation. The team soon became affiliated with the Lebanese Olympic Committee. Lebanese players made their first international appearances in individual events at the 2013 Mediterranean Games, where badminton was first introduced in the games. The national junior team competed in the Mediterranean Badminton Championships team event in 2017 but were eliminated in the group stages.

=== Mixed team ===
In 2023, the Lebanese team made their first senior team appearance at the 2023 Badminton Asia Mixed Team Championships. The team were drawn into Group C with Indonesia, Thailand, Bahrain and Syria. The team lost all matches in the group tie and were eliminated in the group stages.

== Competitive record ==
=== Asian Team Championships ===
==== Mixed team ====
Year	Result
2023	Group Stage − 17th

== Junior competitive record ==
=== Mediterranean Junior Team Championships ===
==== Mixed team ====
Year	Result
2017	Group stage

== Players ==
=== Current squad ===
As of 2 January 2024

==== Men's team ====
Name	DoB/Age	Ranking of event		
Name	DoB/Age	MS	MD	XD
Abi Younes Christophe	23 April 2003 (age 22)	-	-	-
Oliver Khoury	17 April 2007 (age 18)	-	-	-
Raphael Renno	21 October 2006 (age 18)	-	-	-

==== Women's team ====
Name	DoB/Age	Ranking of event		
Name	DoB/Age	WS	WD	XD
Lynne El-Jabbour	20 July 2006 (age 19)	-	-	-
Mira Houssein Agha	26 July 2005 (age 20)	-	-	-
Zeina Kazma	24 March 2006 (age 19)	-	-	-

=== Previous squads ===
==== Asian Team Championships ====
- Mixed team: 2023
