= 2024 Badminton Asia Team Championships – Women's team event =

Women's team at the 2024 Badminton Asia Team Championships
- Venue: Setia City Convention Centre
- Location: Shah Alam, Selangor, Malaysia
- Dates: 13–18 February 2024
- Nations: 11

Medalists
gold medal	India
silver medal	Thailand
bronze medal	Japan
bronze medal	Indonesia

The women's team event at the 2024 Badminton Asia Team Championships took place from 13 to 18 February at the Setia City Convention Centre in Shah Alam, Selangor, Malaysia. Indonesia were the winner of the last edition.

== Seeds ==
The seeds were announced on 9 January 2024 based on the BWF World Team Rankings.

1. China (quarter-finals)
2. Japan (semi-finals)
3. Thailand (final)
4. Indonesia (semi-finals)

== Group stage ==
The draw was held on 30 January 2024. The women's team group stages consist of 4 groups: W, X, Y, and Z.

Group W	Group X	Group Y	Group Z
China (1); India	Indonesia (4); Hong Kong; Kazakhstan	Thailand (3); Malaysia; United Arab Emirates	Japan (2); Chinese Taipei; Singapore

== Group stage ==
All times are Malaysia Standard Time (UTC+08:00).

=== Group W ===
Pos	Team	Pld	W	L	MF	MA	MD	GF	GA	GD	PF	PA	PD	Pts	Qualification
1	India	1	1	0	3	2	+1	6	6	0	214	231	−17	1	Knockout stage
2	China	1	0	1	2	3	−1	6	6	0	231	214	+17	0	Knockout stage

==== China vs India ====
China
2
Setia City Convention Centre, Court 1
14 February 2024, 09:00

India
3

			1	2	3
1	(China) (India)	Han Yue; P. V. Sindhu	17; 21	15; 21
2	(China) (India)	Liu Shengshu / Tan Ning; Tanisha Crasto / Ashwini Ponnappa	21; 19	21; 16
3	(China) (India)	Wang Zhiyi; Ashmita Chaliha	21; 13	21; 15
4	(China) (India)	Li Yijing / Luo Xumin; Treesa Jolly / Gayatri Gopichand	21; 10	18; 21	17; 21
5	(China) (India)	Wu Luoyu; Anmol Kharb	20; 22	21; 14	18; 21

=== Group X ===
Pos	Team	Pld	W	L	MF	MA	MD	GF	GA	GD	PF	PA	PD	Pts	Qualification
1	Indonesia	2	2	0	10	0	+10	20	2	+18	459	249	+210	2	Knockout stage
2	Hong Kong	2	1	1	5	5	0	12	10	+2	398	340	+58	1	Knockout stage
3	Kazakhstan	2	0	2	0	10	−10	0	20	−20	152	420	−268	0	

==== Indonesia vs Kazakhstan ====
Indonesia
5
Setia City Convention Centre, Court 3
13 February 2024, 09:00

Kazakhstan
0

			1	2	3
1	(Indonesia) (Kazakhstan)	Putri Kusuma Wardani; Kamila Smagulova	21; 9	21; 7
2	(Indonesia) (Kazakhstan)	Ester Nurumi Tri Wardoyo; Aisha Zhumabek	21; 8	21; 5
3	(Indonesia) (Kazakhstan)	Komang Ayu Cahya Dewi; Dilyara Jumadilova	21; 2	21; 4
4	(Indonesia) (Kazakhstan)	Lanny Tria Mayasari / Ribka Sugiarto; Nargiza Rakhmetullayeva / Aisha Zhumabek	21; 4	21; 10
5	(Indonesia) (Kazakhstan)	Meilysa Trias Puspita Sari / Rachel Allessya Rose; Dilyara Jumadilova / Kamila Smagulova	21; 5	21; 7

==== Hong Kong vs Kazakhstan ====
Hong Kong
5
Setia City Convention Centre, Court 4
14 February 2024, 09:00

Kazakhstan
0

			1	2	3
1	(Hong Kong) (Kazakhstan)	Lo Sin Yan; Kamila Smagulova	21; 15	21; 10
2	(Hong Kong) (Kazakhstan)	Yeung Sum Yee; Aisha Zhumabek	21; 15	21; 7
3	(Hong Kong) (Kazakhstan)	Saloni Samirbhai Mehta; Nargiza Rakhmetullayeva	21; 5	21; 8
4	(Hong Kong) (Kazakhstan)	Fan Ka Yan / Yau Mau Ying; Yeva Butpayeva / Dilyara Jumadilova	21; 6	21; 6
5	(Hong Kong) (Kazakhstan)	Lui Lok Lok / Ng Wing Yung; Nargiza Rakhmetullayeva / Aisha Zhumabek	21; 10	21; 9

==== Indonesia vs Hong Kong ====
Indonesia
5
Setia City Convention Centre, Court 2
15 February 2024, 09:00

Hong Kong
0

			1	2	3
1	(Indonesia) (Hong Kong)	Putri Kusuma Wardani; Lo Sin Yan	21; 14	21; 16
2	(Indonesia) (Hong Kong)	Febriana Dwipuji Kusuma / Amallia Cahaya Pratiwi; Yeung Nga Ting / Yeung Pui Lam	19; 21	21; 10	21; 19
3	(Indonesia) (Hong Kong)	Ester Nurumi Tri Wardoyo; Yeung Sum Yee	21; 14	21; 13
4	(Indonesia) (Hong Kong)	Lanny Tria Mayasari / Ribka Sugiarto; Lui Lok Lok / Ng Wing Yung	17; 21	21; 15	24; 22
5	(Indonesia) (Hong Kong)	Stephanie Widjaja; Liang Ka Wing	21; 13	21; 10

=== Group Y ===
Pos	Team	Pld	W	L	MF	MA	MD	GF	GA	GD	PF	PA	PD	Pts	Qualification
1	Thailand	2	2	0	9	1	+8	19	3	+16	459	286	+173	2	Knockout stage
2	Malaysia	2	1	1	6	4	+2	13	9	+4	430	339	+91	1	Knockout stage
3	United Arab Emirates	2	0	2	0	10	−10	0	20	−20	156	420	−264	0	

==== Thailand vs United Arab Emirates ====
Thailand
5
Setia City Convention Centre, Court 1
13 February 2024, 09:00

United Arab Emirates
0

			1	2	3
1	(Thailand) (United Arab Emirates)	Supanida Katethong; Nurani Ratu Azzahra	21; 13	21; 9
2	(Thailand) (United Arab Emirates)	Busanan Ongbamrungphan; Madhumitha Sundarapandian	21; 3	21; 1
3	(Thailand) (United Arab Emirates)	Tidapron Kleebyeesun; Nayonika Rajesh	21; 9	21; 9
4	(Thailand) (United Arab Emirates)	Laksika Kanlaha / Phataimas Muenwong; Zainaba Reem Siraj / Sreeyuktha Sreejith Parol	21; 9	21; 5
5	(Thailand) (United Arab Emirates)	Benyapa Aimsaard / Nuntakarn Aimsaard; Nayonika Rajesh / Madhumitha Sundarapandian	21; 3	21; 5

==== Malaysia vs United Arab Emirates ====
Malaysia
5
Setia City Convention Centre, Court 3
14 February 2024, 09:00

United Arab Emirates
0

			1	2	3
1	(Malaysia) (United Arab Emirates)	Goh Jin Wei; Nurani Ratu Azzahra	21; 13	21; 9
2	(Malaysia) (United Arab Emirates)	Letshanaa Karupathevan; Madhumitha Sundarapandian	21; 11	21; 14
3	(Malaysia) (United Arab Emirates)	Wong Ling Ching; Sreeyuktha Sreejith Parol	21; 4	21; 12
4	(Malaysia) (United Arab Emirates)	Pearly Tan / Thinaah Muralitharan; Nayonika Rajesh / Madhumitha Sundarapandian	21; 4	21; 5
5	(Malaysia) (United Arab Emirates)	Tan Zhing Yi / Teoh Mei Xing; Zainaba Reem Siraj / Sreeyuktha Sreejith Parol	21; 4	21; 14

==== Thailand vs Malaysia ====
Thailand
4
Setia City Convention Centre, Court 3
15 February 2024, 09:00

Malaysia
1

			1	2	3
1	(Thailand) (Malaysia)	Supanida Katethong; Goh Jin Wei	21; 13	26; 24
2	(Thailand) (Malaysia)	Jongkolphan Kititharakul / Rawinda Prajongjai; Pearly Tan / Thinaah Muralitharan	20; 22	21; 15	21; 19
3	(Thailand) (Malaysia)	Busanan Ongbamrungphan; Letshanaa Karupathevan	21; 17	21; 18
4	(Thailand) (Malaysia)	Benyapa Aimsaard / Nuntakarn Aimsaard; Tan Zhing Yi / Teoh Mei Xing	21; 17	21; 18
5	(Thailand) (Malaysia)	Pornpicha Choeikeewong; Wong Ling Ching	19; 21	21; 15	16; 21

=== Group Z ===
Pos	Team	Pld	W	L	MF	MA	MD	GF	GA	GD	PF	PA	PD	Pts	Qualification
1	Japan	2	2	0	10	0	+10	20	1	+19	442	271	+171	2	Knockout stage
2	Chinese Taipei	2	1	1	5	5	0	11	12	−1	419	393	+26	1	Knockout stage
3	Singapore	2	0	2	0	10	−10	2	20	−18	261	458	−197	0	

==== Japan vs Singapore ====
Japan
5
Setia City Convention Centre, Court 2
13 February 2024, 09:00

Singapore
0

			1	2	3
1	(Japan) (Singapore)	Aya Ohori; Yeo Jia Min	21; 12	21; 12
2	(Japan) (Singapore)	Rena Miyaura / Ayako Sakuramoto; Heng Xiao En / Jin Yujia	21; 13	21; 4
3	(Japan) (Singapore)	Nozomi Okuhara; Insyirah Khan	21; 10	21; 10
4	(Japan) (Singapore)	Rin Iwanaga / Kie Nakanishi; Elsa Lai / Lim Su Qi	21; 3	21; 9
5	(Japan) (Singapore)	Tomoka Miyazaki; Jaslyn Hooi	21; 9	21; 18

==== Chinese Taipei vs Singapore ====
Chinese Taipei
5
Setia City Convention Centre, Court 2
14 February 2024, 09:00

Singapore
0

			1	2	3
1	(Chinese Taipei) (Singapore)	Hsu Wen-chi; Insyirah Khan	21; 17	21; 9
2	(Chinese Taipei) (Singapore)	Hsu Ya-ching / Lin Wan-ching; Heng Xiao En / Jin Yujia	21; 11	21; 17
3	(Chinese Taipei) (Singapore)	Pai Yu-po; Jaslyn Hooi	18; 21	21; 15	21; 11
4	(Chinese Taipei) (Singapore)	Chang Ching-hui / Yang Ching-tun; Elsa Lai / Michelle Zan	21; 10	21; 12
5	(Chinese Taipei) (Singapore)	Sung Shuo-yun; Megan Lee	21; 4	20; 22	21; 12

==== Japan vs Chinese Taipei ====
Japan
5
Setia City Convention Centre, Court 1
15 February 2024, 09:00

Chinese Taipei
0

			1	2	3
1	(Japan) (Chinese Taipei)	Aya Ohori; Hsu Wen-chi	21; 19	21; 14
2	(Japan) (Chinese Taipei)	Rena Miyaura / Ayako Sakuramoto; Chang Ching-hui / Yang Ching-tun	21; 13	21; 12
3	(Japan) (Chinese Taipei)	Nozomi Okuhara; Sung Shuo-yun	22; 24	21; 18	21; 14
4	(Japan) (Chinese Taipei)	Rin Iwanaga / Kie Nakanishi; Hu Ling-fang / Lin Xiao-min	21; 18	21; 13
5	(Japan) (Chinese Taipei)	Natsuki Nidaira; Lin Sih-yun	21; 18	21; 8

== Knockout stage ==
=== Bracket ===
Quarter-finals
16 February 10:00
Japan (2)	3
China (1)	2
16 February 10:00
India	3
Hong Kong	0
16 February 10:00
Malaysia	0
Indonesia (4)	3
16 February 10:00
Chinese Taipei	1
Thailand (3)	3

Semi-finals
17 February 10:00
Japan (2)	2
India	3
17 February 10:00
Indonesia (4)	1
Thailand (3)	3

Final
18 February 10:00
India	3
Thailand (3)	2

=== Quarter-finals ===
==== Japan vs China ====
Japan
3
Setia City Convention Centre, Court 1
16 February 2024, 10:00

China
2

			1	2	3
1	(Japan) (China)	Aya Ohori; Han Yue	8; 21	11; 21
2	(Japan) (China)	Nami Matsuyama / Chiharu Shida; Li Yijing / Luo Xumin	13; 21	21; 11	21; 13
3	(Japan) (China)	Nozomi Okuhara; Wang Zhiyi	14; 21	24; 22	7; 21
4	(Japan) (China)	Rena Miyaura / Ayako Sakuramoto; Keng Shuliang / Zhang Chi	21; 9	21; 10
5	(Japan) (China)	Natsuki Nidaira; Chen Lu	22; 20	21; 12

==== Malaysia vs Indonesia ====
Malaysia
0
Setia City Convention Centre, Court 2
16 February 2024, 10:00

Indonesia
3

			1	2	3
1	(Malaysia) (Indonesia)	Letshanaa Karupathevan; Putri Kusuma Wardani	12; 21	21; 18	13; 21
2	(Malaysia) (Indonesia)	Pearly Tan / Thinaah Muralitharan; Lanny Tria Mayasari / Ribka Sugiarto	14; 21	21; 18	15; 21
3	(Malaysia) (Indonesia)	Wong Ling Ching; Ester Nurumi Tri Wardoyo	21; 14	15; 21	16; 21
4	(Malaysia) (Indonesia)	Tan Zhing Yi / Teoh Mei Xing; Amallia Cahaya Pratiwi / Rachel Allessya Rose				not played
5	(Malaysia) (Indonesia)	Siti Nurshuhaini; Komang Ayu Cahya Dewi				not played

==== India vs Hong Kong ====
India
3
Setia City Convention Centre, Court 3
16 February 2024, 10:00

Hong Kong
0

			1	2	3
1	(India) (Hong Kong)	P. V. Sindhu; Lo Sin Yan	21; 7	16; 21	21; 12
2	(India) (Hong Kong)	Tanisha Crasto / Ashwini Ponnappa; Yeung Nga Ting / Yeung Pui Lam	21; 10	21; 14
3	(India) (Hong Kong)	Ashmita Chaliha; Yeung Sum Yee	21; 12	21; 13
4	(India) (Hong Kong)	Treesa Jolly / Gayatri Gopichand; Fan Ka Yan / Yau Mau Ying				not played
5	(India) (Hong Kong)	Anmol Kharb; Saloni Samirbhai Mehta				not played

==== Chinese Taipei vs Thailand ====
Chinese Taipei
1
Setia City Convention Centre, Court 4
16 February 2024, 10:00

Thailand
3

			1	2	3
1	(Chinese Taipei) (Thailand)	Hsu Wen-chi; Supanida Katethong	21; 14	21; 17
2	(Chinese Taipei) (Thailand)	Hsu Ya-ching / Lin Wan-ching; Jongkolphan Kititharakul / Rawinda Prajongjai	23; 21	11; 21	16; 21
3	(Chinese Taipei) (Thailand)	Pai Yu-po; Busanan Ongbamrungphan	11; 21	15; 21
4	(Chinese Taipei) (Thailand)	Hu Ling-fang / Yang Ching-tun; Benyapa Aimsaard / Nuntakarn Aimsaard	21; 18	19; 21	12; 21
5	(Chinese Taipei) (Thailand)	Sung Shuo-yun; Pornpicha Choeikeewong				not played

=== Semi-finals ===
==== Indonesia vs Thailand ====
Indonesia
1
Setia City Convention Centre, Court 1
17 February 2024, 10:00

Thailand
3

			1	2	3
1	(Indonesia) (Thailand)	Putri Kusuma Wardani; Supanida Katethong	17; 21	19; 21
2	(Indonesia) (Thailand)	Lanny Tria Mayasari / Ribka Sugiarto; Jongkolphan Kititharakul / Rawinda Prajongjai	20; 22	14; 21
3	(Indonesia) (Thailand)	Ester Nurumi Tri Wardoyo; Busanan Ongbamrungphan	25; 23	21; 16
4	(Indonesia) (Thailand)	Amallia Cahaya Pratiwi / Rachel Allessya Rose; Benyapa Aimsaard / Nuntakarn Aimsaard	22; 24	14; 21
5	(Indonesia) (Thailand)	Komang Ayu Cahya Dewi; Pornpicha Choeikeewong				not played

==== Japan vs India ====
Japan
2
Setia City Convention Centre, Court 2
17 February 2024, 10:00

India
3

			1	2	3
1	(Japan) (India)	Aya Ohori; P. V. Sindhu	21; 13	22; 20
2	(Japan) (India)	Nami Matsuyama / Chiharu Shida; Treesa Jolly / Gayatri Gopichand	17; 21	21; 16	20; 22
3	(Japan) (India)	Nozomi Okuhara; Ashmita Chaliha	17; 21	14; 21
4	(Japan) (India)	Rena Miyaura / Ayako Sakuramoto; Ashwini Ponnappa / P. V. Sindhu	21; 14	21; 11
5	(Japan) (India)	Natsuki Nidaira; Anmol Kharb	14; 21	18; 21

=== Final ===
==== India vs Thailand ====
India
3
Setia City Convention Centre, Court 1
18 February 2024, 10:00

Thailand
2

			1	2	3
1	(India) (Thailand)	P. V. Sindhu; Supanida Katethong	21; 12	21; 12
2	(India) (Thailand)	Treesa Jolly / Gayatri Gopichand; Jongkolphan Kititharakul / Rawinda Prajongjai	21; 16	18; 21	21; 16
3	(India) (Thailand)	Ashmita Chaliha; Busanan Ongbamrungphan	11; 21	14; 21
4	(India) (Thailand)	Priya Konjengbam / Shruti Mishra; Benyapa Aimsaard / Nuntakarn Aimsaard	11; 21	9; 21
5	(India) (Thailand)	Anmol Kharb; Pornpicha Choeikeewong	21; 14	21; 9

== Final ranking ==
Pos	Team	Pld	W	L	Pts	MD	GD	PD	Final result
1st place, gold medalist(s)	India	4	4	0	8	+6	+7	+36	Champions
2nd place, silver medalist(s)	Thailand	5	4	1	8	+11	+21	+211	Runners-up
3rd place, bronze medalist(s)	Indonesia	4	3	1	6	+11	+17	+221	Eliminated in semi-finals
3rd place, bronze medalist(s)	Japan	4	3	1	6	+10	+20	+178	Eliminated in semi-finals
5	Malaysia	3	1	2	2	−1	+1	+63	Eliminated in quarter-finals
6	Chinese Taipei	3	1	2	2	−2	−3	0	Eliminated in quarter-finals
7	Hong Kong	3	1	2	2	−3	−3	+5	Eliminated in quarter-finals
8	China	2	0	2	0	−2	−2	+15	Eliminated in quarter-finals
9	Singapore	2	0	2	0	−10	−18	−197	Eliminated in group stage
10	United Arab Emirates	2	0	2	0	−10	−20	−264	Eliminated in group stage
11	Kazakhstan	2	0	2	0	−10	−20	−268	Eliminated in group stage
