= 2025 Badminton Asia Junior Championships – Teams event =

Tournament details
- Dates: 18 – 22 July 2025
- Edition: 25th
- Level: International
- Venue: Manahan Indoor Sports Hall
- Location: Surakarta, Central Java, Indonesia

The teams event of the 2025 Badminton Asia Junior Championships was held from 18–22 July 2025. China was the champion of the last edition held in Yogyakarta, Indonesia.

17 countries competed in this event. The group draw was done on 8 July.

== Seedings ==
The seedings for teams competing in the tournament were released on June 6, 2024. It was based on aggregated points from the best players in the BWF World Junior Ranking.

1. Thailand (finals)
2. India (quarter-finals)
3. Indonesia (quarter-finals)
4. China (champion)
5. Chinese Taipei (group stage)
6. Malaysia (quarter-finals)
7. South Korea (semi-finals)
8. Hong Kong (quarter-finals)
9. United Arab Emirates (group stage)
10. Japan (semi-finals)
11. Singapore (group stage)
12. Vietnam (group stage)
13. Sri Lanka (group stage)
14. Kazakhstan (group stage)
15. Philippines (group stage)
16. Macau (group stage)
17. Myanmar (group stage)

== Group stage ==
=== Group A ===
Pos	Team	Pld	W	L	MF	MA	MD	GF	GA	GD	PF	PA	PD	Pts	Qualification	Thailand	Japan	Chinese Taipei for Olympic games	Kazakhstan
1	Thailand	3	3	0	330	259	+71	20	10	+10	1755	1421	+334	3	Advance to knockout stage	—	110–101	110–106	110–52
2	Japan	3	2	1	321	263	+58	18	12	+6	1745	1442	+303	2	Advance to knockout stage		—	110–104	110–49
3	Chinese Taipei	3	1	2	320	265	+55	22	8	+14	1777	1418	+359	1				—	110–45
4	Kazakhstan	3	0	3	146	330	−184	0	30	−30	819	1815	−996	0					—

Source: bwfbadminton

=== Group B ===
Pos	Team	Pld	W	L	MF	MA	MD	GF	GA	GD	PF	PA	PD	Pts	Qualification	Indonesia	Malaysia	Singapore	Macau	Myanmar
1	Indonesia (H)	4	4	0	440	277	+163	38	2	+36	2415	1466	+949	4	Advance to knockout stage	—	110–92	110–66	110–72	110–47
2	Malaysia	4	3	1	422	279	+143	31	9	+22	2339	1501	+838	3	Advance to knockout stage		—	110–58	110–59	110–52
3	Singapore	4	1	3	340	411	−71	17	23	−6	1828	2233	−405	1				—	110–81	106–110
4	Macau	4	1	3	322	427	−105	7	33	−26	1695	2367	−672	1					—	110–97
5	Myanmar	4	1	3	306	436	−130	7	33	−26	1677	2387	−710	1						—

Source: bwfbadminton
(H) Host

==== Indonesia vs Myanmar ====
(110) Indonesia vs Myanmar (47); Friday, 18 July 2025, 08:30 UTC+7; Manahan Indoor Sports Hall, Court 1
#	Category	Indonesia	Score (Partition score)	Myanmar
1	MS	Zaki Ubaidillah (Indonesia)	11–5 (11–2)	(Myanmar) Nyan Shaine Lin
2	WD	Riska Anggraini (Indonesia); Rinjani Kwinnara Nastine (Indonesia)	22–10 (11–2)	(Myanmar) Yoon Thethtar Maung (Myanmar) Nan Sam Chan Thaw
3	WS	Thalita Ramadhani Wiryawan (Indonesia)	33–15 (11–0)	(Myanmar) Lin Lin Htet
4	MD	Muhammad Rizki Mubarrok (Indonesia); Raihan Daffa Edsel Pramono (Indonesia)	44–21 (11–6)	(Myanmar) Phone Htet Zaw (Myanmar) Lal Zuidika
5	XD	Kenzie Yoe (Indonesia); Luna Rianty Saffana (Indonesia)	55–26 (11–5)	(Myanmar) Phone Htet Zaw (Myanmar) Eaint Chit Phoo
6	MS	Zaki Ubaidillah (Indonesia)	66–32 (11–6)	(Myanmar) Nyan Shaine Lin
7	WD	Riska Anggraini (Indonesia); Rinjani Kwinnara Nastine (Indonesia)	77–35 (11–2)	(Myanmar) Yoon Thethtar Maung (Myanmar) Nan Sam Chan Thaw
8	WS	Thalita Ramadhani Wiryawan (Indonesia)	88–40 (11–3)	(Myanmar) Lin Lin Htet
9	MD	Muhammad Vito Annafsa (Indonesia); Grendly Alkatib Lumintang (Indonesia)	99–45 (11–3)	(Myanmar) Nyan Min Htet (Myanmar) Lal Zuidika
10	XD	Theodorus Steve Kurniawan (Indonesia); Luna Rianty Saffana (Indonesia)	110–47 (11–2)	(Myanmar) Phone Htet Zaw (Myanmar) Eaint Chit Phoo
Result

==== Indonesia vs Macau ====
(110) Indonesia vs Macau (72); Friday, 18 July 2025, 16:30 UTC+7; Manahan Indoor Sports Hall, Court 1
#	Category	Indonesia	Score (Partition score)	Macau
1	WD	Riska Anggraini (Indonesia); Jania Novalita Situmorang (Indonesia)	8–11 (8–11)	(Macau) Ian Chi Cheng (Macau) Ung Cheok Ian
2	MS	Richie Duta Richardo (Indonesia)	22–14 (14–3)	(Macau) Chio Chi Seng
3	MD	Ikhsan Lintang Pramudya (Indonesia); Devin Artha Wahyudi (Indonesia)	33–15 (11–1)	(Macau) Kou Sin Iong (Macau) Ou Ka Hou
4	XD	Kenzie Yoe (Indonesia); Luna Rianty Saffana (Indonesia)	44–20 (11–5)	(Macau) Lei Lok Him (Macau) Chan Hao Wai
5	WS	Salsabila Amiradana (Indonesia)	55–36 (11–16)	(Macau) Chan Hao Wai
6	WD	Sheila Lidia (Indonesia); Aurelia Syakira Putri (Indonesia)	66–38 (11–2)	(Macau) Ho Hei U (Macau) Kou Sin Cheng
7	MS	Dendi Triansyah (Indonesia)	77–42 (11–4)	(Macau) Chio Chi Seng
8	MD	Ikhsan Lintang Pramudya (Indonesia); Devin Artha Wahyudi (Indonesia)	88–45 (11–3)	(Macau) Kou Sin Iong (Macau) Wong Pak Kio
9	XD	Theodorus Steve Kurniawan (Indonesia); Luna Rianty Saffana (Indonesia)	99–50 (11–5)	(Macau) Lei Lok Him (Macau) Chan Hao Wai
10	WS	Kavita Nadjwa Aulia (Indonesia)	110–72 (11–22)	(Macau) Chan Hao Wai
Result

==== Indonesia vs Singapore ====
(110) Indonesia vs Singapore (66); Saturday, 19 July 2025, 09:00 UTC+7; Manahan Indoor Sports Hall, Court 1
#	Category	Indonesia	Score (Partition score)	Singapore
1	MD	Ikhsan Lintang Pramudya (Indonesia); Devin Artha Wahyudi (Indonesia)	11–5 (11–3)	(Singapore) Marco Boon Jie Le (Singapore) Tan Jia Hui
2	WS	Salsabila Amiradana (Indonesia)	22–10 (11–5)	(Singapore) Aaliyah Zakaria
3	WD	Riska Anggraini (Indonesia); Rinjani Kwinnara Nastine (Indonesia)	33–17 (11–7)	(Singapore) Li Zheng Yan (Singapore) Teo Eng Ker
4	MS	Zaki Ubaidillah (Indonesia)	44–20 (11–3)	(Singapore) Ding Han Jin
5	XD	Devin Artha Wahyudi (Indonesia); Rinjani Kwinnara Nastine (Indonesia)	55–25 (11–1)	(Singapore) Tan Jia Hui (Singapore) Khloe Lim Ke Jia
6	MD	Muhammad Rizki Mubarrok (Indonesia); Raihan Daffa Edsel Pramono (Indonesia)	66–37 (11–12)	(Singapore) Marco Boon Jie Le (Singapore) Ng Ming Zhe
7	WS	Thalita Ramadhani Wiryawan (Indonesia)	77–43 (11–6)	(Singapore) Aaliyah Zakaria
8	WD	Sheila Lidia (Indonesia); Aurelia Syakira Putri (Indonesia)	88–45 (11–2)	(Singapore) Ho Hei U (Singapore) Kou Sin Cheng
9	MS	Richie Duta Richardo (Indonesia)	99–56 (11–11)	(Singapore) Ding Han Jin
10	XD	Ikhsan Lintang Pramudya (Indonesia); Luna Rianty Saffana (Indonesia)	110–66 (11–10)	(Singapore) Ng Ming Zhe (Singapore) Li Zheng Yan
Result

==== Indonesia vs Malaysia ====
(110) Indonesia vs Malaysia (92); Sunday, 20 July 2025, 12:00 UTC+7; Manahan Indoor Sports Hall, Court 1
#	Category	Indonesia	Score (Partition score)	Malaysia
1	MS	Zaki Ubaidillah (Indonesia)	11–5 (11–3)	(Malaysia) Kong Wei Xiang
2	WD	Riska Anggraini (Indonesia); Rinjani Kwinnara Nastine (Indonesia)	20–22 (9–17)	(Malaysia) Low Zi Yu (Malaysia) Dania Sofea
3	WS	Thalita Ramadhani Wiryawan (Indonesia)	33–29 (13–7)	(Malaysia) Oo Shan Zi
4	XD	Theodorus Steve Kurniawan (Indonesia); Luna Rianty Saffana (Indonesia)	44–43 (11–14)	(Malaysia) Loh Ziheng (Malaysia) Noraqilah Maisarah
5	MD	Ikhsan Lintang Pramudya (Indonesia); Devin Artha Wahyudi (Indonesia)	55–52 (11–9)	(Malaysia) Loh Ziheng (Malaysia) Tan Zhi Yang
6	MS	Zaki Ubaidillah (Indonesia)	66–60 (11–8)	(Malaysia) Lim Boon Le
7	WD	Riska Anggraini (Indonesia); Rinjani Kwinnara Nastine (Indonesia)	77–67 (11–7)	(Malaysia) Low Zi Yu (Malaysia) Dania Sofea
8	WS	Thalita Ramadhani Wiryawan (Indonesia)	88–73 (11–6)	(Malaysia) Eng Ler Qi
9	XD	Devin Artha Wahyudi (Indonesia); Rinjani Kwinnara Nastine (Indonesia)	99–81 (11–8)	(Malaysia) Datu Anif Isaac Datu Asrah (Malaysia) Dania Sofea
10	MD	Ikhsan Lintang Pramudya (Indonesia); Devin Artha Wahyudi (Indonesia)	110–92 (11–11)	(Malaysia) Irfan M. Shazmir (Malaysia) Ahmad Redzuan
Result

=== Group C ===
Pos	Team	Pld	W	L	MF	MA	MD	GF	GA	GD	PF	PA	PD	Pts	Qualification	People's Republic of China	South Korea	Philippines	Vietnam
1	China	3	3	0	330	222	+108	29	1	+28	1814	1196	+618	3	Advance to knockout stage	—	110–95	110–69	110–58
2	South Korea	3	2	1	315	293	+22	17	13	+4	1730	1637	+93	2	Advance to knockout stage		—	110–105	110–78
3	Philippines	3	1	2	284	303	−19	10	20	−10	1500	1678	−178	1				—	110–83
4	Vietnam	3	0	3	219	330	−111	4	26	−22	1271	1804	−533	0					—

Source: bwfbadminton

=== Group D ===
Pos	Team	Pld	W	L	MF	MA	MD	GF	GA	GD	PF	PA	PD	Pts	Qualification	India	Hong Kong	United Arab Emirates	Sri Lanka
1	India	3	3	0	330	252	+78	30	0	+30	1815	1288	+527	3	Advance to knockout stage	—	110–100	110–83	110–69
2	Hong Kong	3	2	1	320	296	+24	15	15	0	1711	1669	+42	2	Advance to knockout stage		—	110–91	110–95
3	United Arab Emirates	3	1	2	284	317	−33	11	19	−8	1533	1760	−227	1				—	110–97
4	Sri Lanka	3	0	3	261	330	−69	4	26	−22	1461	1803	−342	0					—

Source: bwfbadminton

== Knockout stage ==
Quarter-finals
21 July
Thailand	110
Hong Kong	98
21 July
Indonesia	109
South Korea	110
21 July
Malaysia	64
China	110
21 July
Japan	110
India	104

Semi-finals
21 July
Thailand	110
South Korea	106
21 July
China	110
Japan	82

Final
22 July
Thailand	90
China	110

=== Quarter-finals ===
==== Indonesia vs South Korea ====
(109) Indonesia vs South Korea (110); Monday, 21 July 2025, 09:00 UTC+7; Manahan Indoor Sports Hall, Court 1
#	Category	Indonesia	Score (Partition score)	South Korea
1	MS	Zaki Ubaidillah (Indonesia)	11–5 (11–5)	(South Korea) Kim Min-seung
2	WD	Riska Anggraini (Indonesia); Rinjani Kwinnara Nastine (Indonesia)	22–21 (11–16)	(South Korea) Cheon Hye-in (South Korea) Moon In-seo
3	XD	Theodorus Steve Kurniawan (Indonesia); Luna Rianty Saffana (Indonesia)	26–33 (4–12)	(South Korea) Lee Hyeong-woo (South Korea) Cheon Hye-in
4	WS	Thalita Ramadhani Wiryawan (Indonesia)	40–44 (14–11)	(South Korea) Kim Bo-hye
5	MD	Ikhsan Lintang Pramudya (Indonesia); Devin Artha Wahyudi (Indonesia)	53–55 (13–11)	(South Korea) Cho Hyeong-woo (South Korea) Lee Hyeong-woo
6	MS	Zaki Ubaidillah (Indonesia)	66–60 (13–5)	(South Korea) Kim Min-seung
7	WD	Riska Anggraini (Indonesia); Rinjani Kwinnara Nastine (Indonesia)	77–76 (11–16)	(South Korea) Cheon Hye-in (South Korea) Moon In-seo
8	XD	Devin Artha Wahyudi (Indonesia); Rinjani Kwinnara Nastine (Indonesia)	84–88 (7–12)	(South Korea) Lee Hyeong-woo (South Korea) Cheon Hye-in
9	WS	Thalita Ramadhani Wiryawan (Indonesia)	97–99 (13–11)	(South Korea) Kim Han-bi
10	MD	Ikhsan Lintang Pramudya (Indonesia); Devin Artha Wahyudi (Indonesia)	109–110 (12–11)	(South Korea) Cho Hyeong-woo (South Korea) Lee Hyeong-woo
Result

== Final ranking ==
Pos	Team	Pld	W	L	Pts	MD	GD	PD	Final result
1st place, gold medalist(s)	China	6	6	0	6	+202			Champions
2nd place, silver medalist(s)	Thailand	6	5	1	5	+67			Runners-up
3rd place, bronze medalist(s)	Japan	5	3	2	3	+36			Eliminated in semi-finals
3rd place, bronze medalist(s)	South Korea	5	3	2	3	+19			Eliminated in semi-finals
5	Indonesia	5	4	1	4	+162			Eliminated in quarter-finals
6	India	4	3	1	3	+72			Eliminated in quarter-finals
7	Malaysia	5	3	2	3	+97			Eliminated in quarter-finals
8	Hong Kong	4	2	2	2	+13			Eliminated in quarter-finals
9	Chinese Taipei	3	1	2	1	+55	+14	+359	Eliminated in group stage
10	Philippines	3	1	2	1	−19	−10	−178	Eliminated in group stage
11	United Arab Emirates	3	1	2	1	−33	−8	−227	Eliminated in group stage
12	Singapore	4	1	3	1	–71	–6	–405	Eliminated in group stage
13	Macau	4	1	3	1	–105	–26	–672	Eliminated in group stage
14	Myanmar	4	1	3	1	–130	–26	–710	Eliminated in group stage
15	Sri Lanka	3	0	3	0	–69	–22	−342	Eliminated in group stage
16	Vietnam	3	0	3	0	–111	–22	–533	Eliminated in group stage
17	Kazakhstan	3	0	3	0	–184	–30	–996	Eliminated in group stage
