= United Arab Emirates national badminton team =

National badminton team representing the United Arab Emirates

United Arab Emirates
- Association: UAE Badminton Federation (UAEBF)
- Confederation: BA (Asia)
- President: Dawoud Al-Hajri

BWF ranking
- Current ranking: 33 ▲8 (2025 - 01 - 07)
- Highest ranking: 28 (2024 - 07 - 02)

Asian Mixed Team Championships
- Appearances: 1 (first in 2023)
- Best result: Group stage (2023)

The United Arab Emirates national badminton team (Arabic: منتخب الإمارات لكرة الريشة) represents the United Arab Emirates in international badminton team competitions. The national team is controlled by the UAE Badminton Federation, the governing body for badminton in the United Arab Emirates. The Emirati team made their first international team appearance at the 2023 Badminton Asia Mixed Team Championships.

== History ==
Badminton has been known and played in the United Arab Emirates since 2014, when the sport gained popularity after Dubai hosted the 2014 BWF Super Series Finals. Following the establishment of the UAE Badminton Federation in 2016, the national team have taken part in Shuttle Time programs organized by the Badminton World Federation.

=== Mixed team ===
The United Arab Emirates were chosen as hosts for the 2023 Badminton Asia Mixed Team Championships and qualified for the championships as the host team. They were placed in Group B with India, Malaysia and Kazakhstan. The Emirati team had a decent debut. Although the team lost 5–0 against India and Malaysia in their first two matches, the team gave a good fight against Kazakhstan and lost narrowly.

== Competitive record ==
=== Thomas Cup ===
Year	Round	Pos
1949	Part of the United Kingdom	
1952	Part of the United Kingdom	
1955	Part of the United Kingdom	
1958	Part of the United Kingdom	
1961	Part of the United Kingdom	
1964	Part of the United Kingdom	
1967	Part of the United Kingdom	
1970	Part of the United Kingdom	
1973	Did not enter	
1976	Did not enter	
1979	Did not enter	
1982	Did not enter	
1984	Did not enter	
1986	Did not enter	
1988	Did not enter	
1990	Did not enter	
1992	Did not enter	
1994	Did not enter	
1996	Did not enter	
1998	Did not enter	
2000	Did not enter	
2002	Did not enter	
2004	Did not enter	
2006	Did not enter	
2008	Did not enter	
2010	Did not enter	
2012	Did not enter	
2014	Did not enter	
2016	Did not enter	
2018	Did not enter	
2020	Did not enter	
2022	Did not enter	
2024	Did not qualify	
2026	TBD	
2028	TBD	
2030	TBD	

=== Uber Cup ===
Year	Round	Pos
1957	Part of the United Kingdom	
1960	Part of the United Kingdom	
1963	Part of the United Kingdom	
1966	Part of the United Kingdom	
1969	Part of the United Kingdom	
1972	Did not enter	
1975	Did not enter	
1978	Did not enter	
1981	Did not enter	
1984	Did not enter	
1986	Did not enter	
1988	Did not enter	
1990	Did not enter	
1992	Did not enter	
1994	Did not enter	
1996	Did not enter	
1998	Did not enter	
2000	Did not enter	
2002	Did not enter	
2004	Did not enter	
2006	Did not enter	
2008	Did not enter	
2010	Did not enter	
2012	Did not enter	
2014	Did not enter	
2016	Did not enter	
2018	Did not enter	
2020	Did not enter	
2022	Did not enter	
2024	Did not qualify	
2026	TBD	
2028	TBD	
2030	TBD	

=== Sudirman Cup ===
Year	Round	Pos
1989	Did not enter	
1991	Did not enter	
1993	Did not enter	
1995	Did not enter	
1997	Did not enter	
1999	Did not enter	
2001	Did not enter	
2003	Did not enter	
2005	Did not enter	
2007	Did not enter	
2009	Did not enter	
2011	Did not enter	
2013	Did not enter	
2015	Did not enter	
2017	Did not enter	
2019	Did not enter	
2021	Did not enter	
2023	Did not qualify	
2025	TBD	
2027	TBD	
2029	TBD	

=== Asian Games ===
==== Men's team ====
Year	Round	Pos
1962	Part of the United Kingdom	
1966	Part of the United Kingdom	
1970	Part of the United Kingdom	
1974	Did not enter	
1978	Did not enter	
1982	Did not enter	
1986	Did not enter	
1990	Did not enter	
1994	Did not enter	
1998	Did not enter	
2002	Did not enter	
2006	Did not enter	
2010	Did not enter	
2014	Did not enter	
2018	Did not enter	
2022	Did not enter	
2026	TBD	
2030	TBD	
2034	TBD	
2038	TBD	

==== Women's team ====
Year	Round	Pos
1962	Part of the United Kingdom	
1966	Part of the United Kingdom	
1970	Part of the United Kingdom	
1974	Did not enter	
1978	Did not enter	
1982	Did not enter	
1986	Did not enter	
1990	Did not enter	
1994	Did not enter	
1998	Did not enter	
2002	Did not enter	
2006	Did not enter	
2010	Did not enter	
2014	Did not enter	
2018	Did not enter	
2022	Did not enter	
2026	TBD	
2030	TBD	
2034	TBD	
2038	TBD	

=== Asian Team Championships ===
==== Men's team ====
Year	Round	Pos
1962	Part of the United Kingdom	
1965	Part of the United Kingdom	
1969	Part of the United Kingdom	
1971	Did not enter	
1976	Did not enter	
1983	Did not enter	
1985	Did not enter	
1987	Did not enter	
1989	Did not enter	
1993	Did not enter	
2004	Did not enter	
2006	Did not enter	
2008	Did not enter	
2010	Did not enter	
2012	Did not enter	
2016	Did not enter	
2018	Did not enter	
2020	Did not enter	
2022	Did not enter	
2024	Group Stage	10th
2026	TBD	
2028	TBD	
2030	TBD	

==== Women's team ====
Year	Round	Pos
2004	Did not enter	
2006	Did not enter	
2008	Did not enter	
2010	Did not enter	
2012	Did not enter	
2016	Did not enter	
2018	Did not enter	
2020	Did not enter	
2022	Did not enter	
2024	Group Stage	10th
2026	TBD	
2028	TBD	
2030	TBD	

==== Mixed team ====
Year	Round	Pos
2017	Did not enter	
2019	Did not enter	
2023	Group stage	14th
2025	TBD	
2027	TBD	
2029	TBD	

=== Arab Games ===
==== Men's team ====
Year	Round	Pos
1999	Did not enter	
2004	Did not enter	
2007	Did not enter	

==== Women's team ====
Year	Round	Pos
1999	Did not enter	
2004	Did not enter	
2007	Did not enter	

=== Arab Team Championships ===
==== Men's team ====
Year	Round	Pos
1996	Did not enter	
1998	Did not enter	
2000	Did not enter	
2002	Did not enter	
2004	Did not enter	
2009	Did not enter	
2011	Did not enter	
2017	Did not enter	
2024	TBD	

==== Women's team ====
Year	Round	Pos
1996	Did not enter	
1998	Did not enter	
2000	Did not enter	
2002	Did not enter	
2004	Did not enter	
2009	Did not enter	
2011	Did not enter	
2017	Did not enter	
2024	TBD	

**Red border color indicates tournament was held on home soil.

== Junior competitive record ==
=== Suhandinata Cup ===
Year	Round	Pos
2000	Did not enter	
2002	Did not enter	
2004	Did not enter	
2006	Did not enter	
2007	Did not enter	
2008	Did not enter	
2009	Did not enter	
2010	Did not enter	
2011	Did not enter	
2012	Did not enter	
2013	Did not enter	
2014	Did not enter	
2015	Did not enter	
2016	Did not enter	
2017	Did not enter	
2018	Did not enter	
2019	Did not enter	
2020	Cancelled because of COVID-19 pandemic	
2021	Cancelled because of COVID-19 pandemic	
2022	Did not enter	
2023	Did not enter	
2024	Group stage	11th of 39
2025	Group stage	19th of 36
2026	Quarter-finals	6th of 47

=== Asian Junior Team Championships ===
==== Boys' team ====
Year	Round	Pos
1997	Did not enter	
1998	Did not enter	
1999	Did not enter	
2000	Did not enter	
2001	Did not enter	
2002	Did not enter	
2004	Did not enter	
2005	Did not enter	

==== Girls' team ====
Year	Round	Pos
1997	Did not enter	
1998	Did not enter	
1999	Did not enter	
2000	Did not enter	
2001	Did not enter	
2002	Did not enter	
2004	Did not enter	
2005	Did not enter	

==== Mixed team ====
Year	Round	Pos
2006	Did not enter	
2007	Did not enter	
2008	Did not enter	
2009	Did not enter	
2010	Did not enter	
2011	Did not enter	
2012	Did not enter	
2013	Did not enter	
2014	Did not enter	
2015	Did not enter	
2016	Did not enter	
2017	Did not enter	
2018	Did not enter	
2019	Did not enter	
2023	Group stage	11th
2024	Quarter-finals	5th
2025	Group stage	11th
2026	Group stage	11th

=== Arab Junior Team Championships ===
==== Men's team ====
Year	Round	Pos
2003	Did not enter	
2005	Did not enter	
2007	Did not enter	
2009	Did not enter	
2016	Did not enter	

==== Women's team ====
Year	Round	Pos
2003	Did not enter	
2005	Did not enter	
2007	Did not enter	
2009	Did not enter	
2016	Did not enter	

**Red border color indicates tournament was held on home soil.

== Players ==
=== Current squad ===
As of 2 January 2024

==== Men's team ====
Name	DoB/Age	Ranking of event		
Name	DoB/Age	MS	MD	XD
Somi Romdhani	28 January 1998 (age 28)	359	101	-
Bharath Latheesh	12 July 2007 (age 19)	162	-	-
Dev Ayyappan	16 January 2006 (age 20)	-	71	-
Dhiren Ayyappan	16 January 2006 (age 20)	-	71	-
Kuswanto	15 December 1998 (age 27)	318	298	114
Abheesh Satheerthan	11 October 1996 (age 30)		697	-
Nasser Alsayegh	27 September 2005 (age 21)	-	665	-
Abdulaziz Mohamed	16 May 2010 (age 16)	-	665	-
Hamid Almazrouei	6 February 2006 (age 20)	-	-	-
Dev Vishnu	12 June 2006 (age 20)	374	-	

==== Women's team ====
Name	DoB/Age	Ranking of event		
Name	DoB/Age	WS	WD	XD
Prakriti Bharath	23 August 2007 (age 19)	84	478	-
Nurani Ratu Azzahra	15 May 2002 (age 24)	203	-	129
Madhumitha Sundarapandian	24 May 2007 (age 19)	328	-	-
Zainaba Reem Siraj	8 April 2004 (age 22)	209	457	-
Sreeyuktha Sreejith Parol	22 December 2005 (age 20)	311	-	165
Farah Alhajji	28 June 2006 (age 20)	970	321	-
Ghadeer Ali Altahri	9 October 2006 (age 20)	970	321	-
Sanika Dhawan Gurav	23 May 2005 (age 21)	328	765	-
Taabia Khan	14 June 2006 (age 20)	-	114	110
Aleena Qathun	12 September 2005 (age 21)	-	165	
Akansha Raj	30 June 2007 (age 19)	464	765	-
Nayonika Rajesh	22 January 2005 (age 21)	738	565	-

=== Previous squads ===
==== Asian Team Championships ====
- Mixed team: 2023
