= 2023 Badminton Asia Mixed Team Championships =

Tournament details
- Dates: 14–19 February
- Edition: 3
- Competitors: 17 teams
- Venue: Dubai Exhibition Centre
- Location: Dubai, United Arab Emirates

The 2023 Badminton Asia Mixed Team Championships was the third edition of the Badminton Asia Mixed Team Championships, held at the Dubai Exhibition Centre in Dubai, United Arab Emirates from 14 to 19 February 2023. It was organised by Badminton Asia and United Arab Emirates Badminton Federation.

== Medalists ==
Event	Gold	Silver	Bronze
Mixed team	China; Zhao Junpeng; Lei Lanxi; Cai Yanyan; Gao Fangjie; He Jiting; Zhou Haodong; Ren Xiangyu; Tan Qiang; Li Yijing; Luo Xumin; Liu Shengshu; Tan Ning; Feng Yanzhe; Huang Dongping; Jiang Zhenbang; Wei Yaxin	South Korea; Cho Geon-yeop; Lee Yun-gyu; Sim Yu-jin; Kim Ga-eun; Kim Won-ho; Jin Yong; Na Sung-seung; Jeong Na-eun; Lee So-hee; Baek Ha-na; Lee Yu-lim; Kim Young-hyuk	India; Ishaan Bhatnagar; K. Ashwini Bhat; Tanisha Crasto; Krishna Prasad Garaga; Shikha Gautam; Treesa Jolly; Dhruv Kapila; Aakarshi Kashyap; Vishnuvardhan Goud Panjala; Prannoy H. S. Gayatri Gopichand; Lakshya Sen; Chirag Shetty; P. V. Sindhu
Mixed team	China; Zhao Junpeng; Lei Lanxi; Cai Yanyan; Gao Fangjie; He Jiting; Zhou Haodong; Ren Xiangyu; Tan Qiang; Li Yijing; Luo Xumin; Liu Shengshu; Tan Ning; Feng Yanzhe; Huang Dongping; Jiang Zhenbang; Wei Yaxin	South Korea; Cho Geon-yeop; Lee Yun-gyu; Sim Yu-jin; Kim Ga-eun; Kim Won-ho; Jin Yong; Na Sung-seung; Jeong Na-eun; Lee So-hee; Baek Ha-na; Lee Yu-lim; Kim Young-hyuk	Thailand; Benyapa Aimsaard; Nuntakarn Aimsaard; Lalinrat Chaiwan; Laksika Kanlaha; Saran Jamsri; Pharanyu Kaosamaang; Supanida Katethong; Chasinee Korepap; Ratchapol Makkasasithorn; Phataimas Muenwong; Busanan Ongbamrungphan; Peeratchai Sukphun; Pakkapon Teeraratsakul; Panitchaphon Teeraratsakul; Sitthikom Thammasin; Worrapol Thongsa-Nga

== Tournament ==
The 2023 Badminton Asia Mixed Team Championships (also known as the Tong Yun Kai Cup 2023) was the third edition of the Badminton Asia Mixed Team Championships, a continental badminton tournament to crown the best mixed national badminton teams in Asia. The tournament was held with 17 teams at the Dubai Exhibition Centre in Dubai, United Arab Emirates, from 14 to 19 February 2023. Team China is the defending champion.

=== Venue ===
The tournament was held at the Dubai Exhibition Centre in Dubai, United Arab Emirates.

=== Seeds ===
The seeding are as follows:

1. China
2. Japan
3. Indonesia
4. Malaysia

=== Draw ===
The draw was held on 31 January 2023. The group stage consisted of one group with five teams and three groups each with four teams. The first seeded team, China, was preassigned to Group A, while the second seeded team, Japan, was preassigned to Group D.

Group A	Group B	Group C	Group D
China; South Korea; Singapore; Uzbekistan	Malaysia; India; Kazakhstan; United Arab Emirates	Indonesia; Thailand; Bahrain; Syria; Lebanon	Japan; Chinese Taipei; Hong Kong; Pakistan

== Group stage ==
=== Group A ===
Pos	Team	Pld	W	L	MF	MA	MD	GF	GA	GD	PF	PA	PD	Pts	Qualification
1	China	3	3	0	13	2	+11	26	7	+19	658	441	+217	3	Knockout stage
2	South Korea	3	2	1	12	3	+9	26	9	+17	698	498	+200	2	Knockout stage
3	Singapore	3	1	2	5	10	−5	14	20	−6	577	555	+22	1	
4	Uzbekistan	3	0	3	0	15	−15	0	30	−30	191	630	−439	0	

Source: TournamentSoftware.com

==== South Korea vs Singapore ====
South Korea
5
Dubai Exhibition Centre - Court 1
14 February 2023, 09:00 UTC+4

Singapore
0

			1	2	3
1	(South Korea) (Singapore)	Kim Won-ho / Jeong Na-eun; Andy Kwek / Jin Yujia	21; 15	21; 17
2	(South Korea) (Singapore)	Kim Ga-eun; Yeo Jia Min	19; 21	21; 16	21; 19
3	(South Korea) (Singapore)	Lee Yun-gyu; Loh Kean Yew	10; 21	21; 18	21; 15
4	(South Korea) (Singapore)	Baek Ha-na / Lee So-hee; Jin Yujia / Crystal Wong	18; 21	21; 4	21; 15
5	(South Korea) (Singapore)	Kim Won-ho / Na Sung-seung; Terry Hee / Loh Kean Hean	21; 13	21; 16

==== China vs Uzbekistan ====
China
5
Dubai Exhibition Centre - Court 3
14 February 2023, 09:00 UTC+4

Uzbekistan
0

			1	2	3
1	(China) (Uzbekistan)	Lei Lanxi; Biloliddin Kuchkarboev	21; 6	21; 14
2	(China) (Uzbekistan)	Cai Yanyan; Diana Garamova	21; 5	21; 4
3	(China) (Uzbekistan)	Ren Xiangyu / Tan Qiang; Abdul Voris Muminov / Abdurashid Muminov	21; 3	21; 4
4	(China) (Uzbekistan)	Li Yijing / Luo Xumin; Viktoria Rudakova / Sevinch Sodikova	21; 5	21; 4
5	(China) (Uzbekistan)	Jiang Zhenbang / Wei Yaxin; Gafforbek Jabborov / Makhbuba Makhmudova	21; 3	21; 6

==== China vs Singapore ====
China
5
Dubai Exhibition Centre - Court 2
15 February 2023, 09:00 UTC+4

Singapore
0

			1	2	3
1	(China) (Singapore)	Feng Yanzhe / Huang Dongping; Terry Hee / Crystal Wong	21; 16	21; 12
2	(China) (Singapore)	Lei Lanxi; Jason Teh	14; 21	21; 19	21; 14
3	(China) (Singapore)	Gao Fangjie; Insyirah Khan	21; 3	21; 15
4	(China) (Singapore)	He Jiting / Zhou Haodong; Andy Kwek / Loh Kean Hean	21; 13	21; 14
5	(China) (Singapore)	Liu Shengshu / Tan Ning; Jin Yujia / Crystal Wong	21; 13	21; 16

==== South Korea vs Uzbekistan ====
South Korea
5
Dubai Exhibition Centre - Court 3
15 February 2023, 09:00 UTC+4

Uzbekistan
0

			1	2	3
1	(South Korea) (Uzbekistan)	Kim Young-hyuk / Lee Yu-lim; Gafforbek Jabborov / Makhbuba Makhmudova	21; 4	21; 4
2	(South Korea) (Uzbekistan)	Cho Geon-yeop; Biloliddin Kuchkarboev	21; 8	21; 5
3	(South Korea) (Uzbekistan)	Sim Yu-jin; Diana Garamova	21; 13	21; 9
4	(South Korea) (Uzbekistan)	Jin Yong / Na Sung-seung; Abdul Voris Muminov / Abdurashid Muminov	21; 3	21; 8
5	(South Korea) (Uzbekistan)	Jeong Na-eun / Lee Yu-lim; Viktoria Rudakova / Sevinch Sodikova	21; 4	21; 5

==== China vs South Korea ====
China
3
Dubai Exhibition Centre - Court 1
16 February 2023, 09:00 UTC+4

South Korea
2

			1	2	3
1	(China) (South Korea)	Zhao Junpeng; Cho Geon-yeop	11; 21	21; 16	24; 22
2	(China) (South Korea)	Gao Fangjie; Kim Ga-eun	22; 20	21; 19
3	(China) (South Korea)	Ren Xiangyu / Tan Qiang; Kim Won-ho / Na Sung-seung	18; 21	16; 21
4	(China) (South Korea)	Liu Shengshu / Tan Ning; Baek Ha-na / Lee So-hee	16; 21	16; 21
5	(China) (South Korea)	Jiang Zhenbang / Wei Yaxin; Kim Young-hyuk / Lee Yu-lim	17; 21	21; 15	21; 13

==== Singapore vs Uzbekistan ====
Singapore
5
Dubai Exhibition Centre - Court 2
16 February 2023, 09:00 UTC+4

Uzbekistan
0

			1	2	3
1	(Singapore) (Uzbekistan)	Jason Teh; Abdurashid Muminov	21; 7	21; 10
2	(Singapore) (Uzbekistan)	Insyirah Khan; Diana Garamova	21; 6	21; 3
3	(Singapore) (Uzbekistan)	Andy Kwek / Loh Kean Hean; Gafforbek Jabborov / Biloliddin Kuchkarboev	21; 13	21; 12
4	(Singapore) (Uzbekistan)	Jin Yujia / Crystal Wong; Viktoria Rudakova / Sevinch Sodikova	21; 4	21; 7
5	(Singapore) (Uzbekistan)	Terry Hee / Jessica Tan; Abdul Voris Muminov / Makhbuba Makhmudova	21; 5	21; 7

=== Group B ===
Pos	Team	Pld	W	L	MF	MA	MD	GF	GA	GD	PF	PA	PD	Pts	Qualification
1	India	3	3	0	14	1	+13	28	4	+24	657	403	+254	3	Knockout stage
2	Malaysia	3	2	1	11	4	+7	24	8	+16	641	433	+208	2	Knockout stage
3	Kazakhstan	3	1	2	3	12	−9	6	24	−18	376	609	−233	1	
4	United Arab Emirates (H)	3	0	3	2	13	−11	4	26	−22	385	614	−229	0	

Source: TournamentSoftware.com
(H) Host

==== Malaysia vs United Arab Emirates ====
Malaysia
5
Dubai Exhibition Centre - Court 1
14 February 2023, 13:00 UTC+4

United Arab Emirates
0

			1	2	3
1	(Malaysia) (United Arab Emirates)	Lee Zii Jia; Bharath Latheesh	21; 12	21; 15
2	(Malaysia) (United Arab Emirates)	Goh Jin Wei; Madhumitha Sundarapandian	21; 0	21; 7
3	(Malaysia) (United Arab Emirates)	Ong Yew Sin / Teo Ee Yi; Dev Ayyappan / Dhiren Ayyappan	21; 11	21; 13
4	(Malaysia) (United Arab Emirates)	Pearly Tan / Thinaah Muralitharan; Sanika Dhawan Gurav / Taabia Khan	21; 9	21; 8
5	(Malaysia) (United Arab Emirates)	Tan Kian Meng / Lai Pei Jing; Dev Vishnu / Aleena Qathun	21; 10	21; 9

==== India vs Kazakhstan ====
India
5
Dubai Exhibition Centre - Court 2
14 February 2023, 13:00 UTC+4

Kazakhstan
0

			1	2	3
1	(India) (Kazakhstan)	Ishaan Bhatnagar / Tanisha Crasto; Makhsut Tadzhibullaev / Nargiza Rakhmetullayeva	21; 5	21; 11
2	(India) (Kazakhstan)	Prannoy H. S. Dmitriy Panarin	21; 9	21; 11
3	(India) (Kazakhstan)	P. V. Sindhu; Kamila Smagulova	21; 4	21; 12
4	(India) (Kazakhstan)	Krishna Prasad Garaga / Vishnuvardhan Goud Panjala; Khaitmurat Kulmatov / Artur Niyazov	21; 10	21; 6
5	(India) (Kazakhstan)	Treesa Jolly / Gayatri Gopichand; Nargiza Rakhmetullayeva / Aisha Zhumabek	21; 5	21; 7

==== India vs United Arab Emirates ====
India
5
Dubai Exhibition Centre - Court 1
15 February 2023, 17:00 UTC+4

United Arab Emirates
0

			1	2	3
1	(India) (United Arab Emirates)	Lakshya Sen; Dev Vishnu	21; 16	21; 12
2	(India) (United Arab Emirates)	Aakarshi Kashyap; Madhumitha Sundarapandian	21; 6	21; 7
3	(India) (United Arab Emirates)	Dhruv Kapila / Chirag Shetty; Dev Ayyappan / Dhiren Ayyappan	21; 15	21; 14
4	(India) (United Arab Emirates)	K. Ashwini Bhat / Shikha Gautam; Sanika Dhawan Gurav / Akansha Raj	21; 7	21; 4
5	(India) (United Arab Emirates)	Ishaan Bhatnagar / Tanisha Crasto; Bharath Latheesh / Nayonika Rajesh	21; 13	21; 8

==== Malaysia vs Kazakhstan ====
Malaysia
5
Dubai Exhibition Centre - Court 4
15 February 2023, 17:00 UTC+4

Kazakhstan
0

			1	2	3
1	(Malaysia) (Kazakhstan)	Wong Ling Ching; Aisha Zhumabek	21; 6	21; 13
2	(Malaysia) (Kazakhstan)	Leong Jun Hao; Dmitriy Panarin	21; 12	21; 16
3	(Malaysia) (Kazakhstan)	Go Pei Kee / Teoh Mei Xing; Nargiza Rakhmetullayeva / Kamila Smagulova	21; 7	21; 7
4	(Malaysia) (Kazakhstan)	Aaron Chia / Soh Wooi Yik; Khaitmurat Kulmatov / Artur Niyazov	21; 5	21; 17
5	(Malaysia) (Kazakhstan)	Chen Tang Jie / Toh Ee Wei; Makhsut Tadzhibullaev / Aisha Zhumabek	21; 9	21; 10

==== Malaysia vs India ====
Malaysia
1
Dubai Exhibition Centre - Court 1
16 February 2023, 17:00 UTC+4

India
4

			1	2	3
1	(Malaysia) (India)	Lee Zii Jia; Prannoy H. S.	21; 18	13; 21	23; 25
2	(Malaysia) (India)	Wong Ling Ching; P. V. Sindhu	13; 21	17; 21
3	(Malaysia) (India)	Aaron Chia / Soh Wooi Yik; Dhruv Kapila / Chirag Shetty	21; 16	21; 10
4	(Malaysia) (India)	Pearly Tan / Thinaah Muralitharan; Treesa Jolly / Gayatri Gopichand	21; 23	15; 21
5	(Malaysia) (India)	Chen Tang Jie / Toh Ee Wei; Ishaan Bhatnagar / Tanisha Crasto	19; 21	21; 19	16; 21

==== Kazakhstan vs United Arab Emirates ====
Kazakhstan
3
Dubai Exhibition Centre - Court 4
16 February 2023, 17:00 UTC+4

United Arab Emirates
2

			1	2	3
1	(Kazakhstan) (United Arab Emirates)	Kamila Smagulova; Madhumitha Sundarapandian	17; 21	13; 21
2	(Kazakhstan) (United Arab Emirates)	Dmitriy Panarin; Bharath Latheesh	21; 13	21; 10
3	(Kazakhstan) (United Arab Emirates)	Nargiza Rakhmetullayeva / Aisha Zhumabek; Sanika Dhawan Gurav / Nayonika Rajesh	30; 29	21; 13
4	(Kazakhstan) (United Arab Emirates)	Khaitmurat Kulmatov / Artur Niyazov; Dev Ayyappan / Dhiren Ayyappan	12; 21	9; 21
5	(Kazakhstan) (United Arab Emirates)	Dmitriy Panarin / Aisha Zhumabek; Dev Vishnu / Taabia Khan	21; 13	29; 27

=== Group C ===
Pos	Team	Pld	W	L	MF	MA	MD	GF	GA	GD	PF	PA	PD	Pts	Qualification
1	Indonesia	4	4	0	18	2	+16	36	6	+30	847	412	+435	4	Knockout stage
2	Thailand	4	3	1	17	3	+14	36	6	+30	852	362	+490	3	Knockout stage
3	Bahrain	4	2	2	8	12	−4	16	27	−11	592	771	−179	2	
4	Syria	4	1	3	7	13	−6	17	26	−9	570	738	−168	1	
5	Lebanon	4	0	4	0	20	−20	0	40	−40	262	840	−578	0	

Source: TournamentSoftware.com

==== Indonesia vs Lebanon ====
Indonesia
5
Dubai Exhibition Centre - Court 2
14 February 2023, 09:00 UTC+4

Lebanon
0

			1	2	3
1	(Indonesia) (Lebanon)	Anthony Sinisuka Ginting; Abi Younes Christophe	21; 6	21; 8
2	(Indonesia) (Lebanon)	Putri Kusuma Wardani; Zeina Kazma	21; 5	21; 4
3	(Indonesia) (Lebanon)	Fajar Alfian / Muhammad Rian Ardianto; Abi Younes Christophe / Raphael Renno	21; 6	21; 8
4	(Indonesia) (Lebanon)	Apriyani Rahayu / Siti Fadia Silva Ramadhanti; Mira Houssein Agha / Zeina Kazma	21; 4	21; 5
5	(Indonesia) (Lebanon)	Rehan Naufal Kusharjanto / Lisa Ayu Kusumawati; Oliver Khoury / Lynne El-Jabbour	21; 3	21; 5

==== Thailand vs Syria ====
Thailand
5
Dubai Exhibition Centre - Court 4
14 February 2023, 09:00 UTC+4

Syria
0

			1	2	3
1	(Thailand) (Syria)	Ratchapol Makkasasithorn / Chasinee Korepap; Amjad Al Fassih / Ranim Alhasbani	21; 3	21; 2
2	(Thailand) (Syria)	Sitthikom Thammasin; Aljallad Ahmad	21; 11	21; 5
3	(Thailand) (Syria)	Busanan Ongbamrungphan; Sanaa Mahmoud	21; 7	21; 2
4	(Thailand) (Syria)	Laksika Kanlaha / Phataimas Muenwong; Ranim Alhasbani / Sanaa Mahmoud	21; 3	21; 2
5	(Thailand) (Syria)	Peeratchai Sukphun / Pakkapon Teeraratsakul; Aljallad Ahmad / Amjad Al Fassih	21; 4	21; 9

==== Bahrain vs Lebanon ====
Bahrain
5
Dubai Exhibition Centre - Court 3
14 February 2023, 17:00 UTC+4

Lebanon
0

			1	2	3
1	(Bahrain) (Lebanon)	Mohamed Muanis / Reya Fathima; Abi Younes Christophe / Lynne El-Jabbour	21; 7	21; 17
2	(Bahrain) (Lebanon)	Lizbeth Elsa Binu; Zeina Kazma	21; 8	21; 6
3	(Bahrain) (Lebanon)	Adnan Ebrahim; Raphael Renno	21; 6	21; 11
4	(Bahrain) (Lebanon)	Lizbeth Elsa Binu / Reya Fathima; Mira Houssein Agha / Zeina Kazma	21; 19	21; 17
5	(Bahrain) (Lebanon)	Adnan Ebrahim / Mohamed Muanis; Abi Younes Christophe / Oliver Khoury	21; 10	21; 11

==== Indonesia vs Syria ====
Indonesia
5
Dubai Exhibition Centre - Court 4
14 February 2023, 17:00 UTC+4

Syria
0

			1	2	3
1	(Indonesia) (Syria)	Rinov Rivaldy / Pitha Haningtyas Mentari; Amjad Al Fassih / Sanaa Mahmoud	21; 2	21; 4
2	(Indonesia) (Syria)	Gregoria Mariska Tunjung; Ranim Alhasbani	21; 6	21; 11
3	(Indonesia) (Syria)	Chico Aura Dwi Wardoyo; Aljallad Ahmad	21; 7	21; 15
4	(Indonesia) (Syria)	Lanny Tria Mayasari / Ribka Sugiarto; Ranim Alhasbani / Sanaa Mahmoud	21; 2	21; 5
5	(Indonesia) (Syria)	Pramudya Kusumawardana / Yeremia Rambitan; Aljallad Ahmad / Amjad Al Fassih	21; 7	21; 14

==== Indonesia vs Bahrain ====
Indonesia
5
Dubai Exhibition Centre - Court 1
15 February 2023, 09:00 UTC+4

Bahrain
0

			1	2	3
1	(Indonesia) (Bahrain)	Rinov Rivaldy / Pitha Haningtyas Mentari; Mohamed Muanis / Reya Fathima	21; 7	21; 6
2	(Indonesia) (Bahrain)	Putri Kusuma Wardani; Lizbeth Elsa Binu	21; 7	21; 3
3	(Indonesia) (Bahrain)	Chico Aura Dwi Wardoyo; Adnan Ebrahim	21; 5	21; 9
4	(Indonesia) (Bahrain)	Lanny Tria Mayasari / Ribka Sugiarto; Lizbeth Elsa Binu / Reya Fathima	21; 5	21; 8
5	(Indonesia) (Bahrain)	Pramudya Kusumawardana / Yeremia Rambitan; Adnan Ebrahim / Mohamed Muanis	21; 3	21; 10

==== Thailand vs Lebanon ====
Thailand
5
Dubai Exhibition Centre - Court 4
15 February 2023, 09:00 UTC+4

Lebanon
0

			1	2	3
1	(Thailand) (Lebanon)	Saran Jamsri; Oliver Khoury	21; 4	21; 3
2	(Thailand) (Lebanon)	Lalinrat Chaiwan; Mira Houssein Agha	21; 1	21; 1
3	(Thailand) (Lebanon)	Pharanyu Kaosamaang / Worrapol Thongsa-Nga; Abi Younes Christophe / Oliver Khoury	21; 2	21; 3
4	(Thailand) (Lebanon)	Benyapa Aimsaard / Nuntakarn Aimsaard; Lynne El-Jabbour / Zeina Kazma	21; 1	21; 1
5	(Thailand) (Lebanon)	Pakkapon Teeraratsakul / Phataimas Muenwong; Raphael Renno / Mira Houssein Agha	21; 1	21; 2

==== Thailand vs Bahrain ====
Thailand
5
Dubai Exhibition Centre - Court 2
15 February 2023, 17:00 UTC+4

Bahrain
0

			1	2	3
1	(Thailand) (Bahrain)	Ratchapol Makkasasithorn / Chasinee Korepap; Mohamed Muanis / Reya Fathima	21; 6	21; 7
2	(Thailand) (Bahrain)	Panitchaphon Teeraratsakul; Adnan Ebrahim	21; 15	21; 16
3	(Thailand) (Bahrain)	Supanida Katethong; Lizbeth Elsa Binu	21; 5	21; 3
4	(Thailand) (Bahrain)	Peeratchai Sukphun / Pakkapon Teeraratsakul; Adnan Ebrahim / Mohamed Muanis	21; 11	21; 6
5	(Thailand) (Bahrain)	Laksika Kanlaha / Phataimas Muenwong; Lizbeth Elsa Binu / Reya Fathima	21; 5	21; 4

==== Syria vs Lebanon ====
Syria
5
Dubai Exhibition Centre - Court 3
15 February 2023, 17:00 UTC+4

Lebanon
0

			1	2	3
1	(Syria) (Lebanon)	Amjad Al Fassih / Sanaa Mahmoud; Raphael Renno / Zeina Kazma	21; 13	21; 3
2	(Syria) (Lebanon)	Ranim Alhasbani; Lynne El-Jabbour	21; 15	21; 6
3	(Syria) (Lebanon)	Aljallad Ahmad; Abi Younes Christophe	21; 7	21; 9
4	(Syria) (Lebanon)	Ranim Alhasbani / Sanaa Mahmoud; Lynne El-Jabbour / Mira Houssein Agha	21; 6	21; 3
5	(Syria) (Lebanon)	Aljallad Ahmad / Amjad Al Fassih; Oliver Khoury / Raphael Renno	21; 9	21; 6

==== Indonesia vs Thailand ====
Indonesia
3
Dubai Exhibition Centre - Court 2
16 February 2023, 13:00 UTC+4

Thailand
2

			1	2	3
1	(Indonesia) (Thailand)	Anthony Sinisuka Ginting; Sitthikom Thammasin	9; 21	12; 21
2	(Indonesia) (Thailand)	Gregoria Mariska Tunjung; Busanan Ongbamrungphan	18; 21	15; 21
3	(Indonesia) (Thailand)	Fajar Alfian / Muhammad Rian Ardianto; Pharanyu Kaosamaang / Worrapol Thongsa-Nga	21; 13	19; 21	21; 16
4	(Indonesia) (Thailand)	Apriyani Rahayu / Siti Fadia Silva Ramadhanti; Benyapa Aimsaard / Nuntakarn Aimsaard	18; 21	21; 16	21; 14
5	(Indonesia) (Thailand)	Rinov Rivaldy / Pitha Haningtyas Mentari; Pakkapon Teeraratsakul / Phataimas Muenwong	21; 18	21; 19

==== Bahrain vs Syria ====
Bahrain
3
Dubai Exhibition Centre - Court 4
16 February 2023, 13:00 UTC+4

Syria
2

			1	2	3
1	(Bahrain) (Syria)	Mohamed Muanis / Reya Fathima; Amjad Al Fassih / Ranim Alhasbani	18; 21	21; 16	21; 14
2	(Bahrain) (Syria)	Adnan Ebrahim; Aljallad Ahmad	21; 16	22; 24	21; 12
3	(Bahrain) (Syria)	Lizbeth Elsa Binu; Sanaa Mahmoud	13; 21	11; 21
4	(Bahrain) (Syria)	Adnan Ebrahim / Mohamed Muanis; Aljallad Ahmad / Amjad Al Fassih	17; 21	21; 17	21; 14
5	(Bahrain) (Syria)	Lizbeth Elsa Binu / Reya Fathima; Ranim Alhasbani / Sanaa Mahmoud	15; 21	19; 21

=== Group D ===
Pos	Team	Pld	W	L	MF	MA	MD	GF	GA	GD	PF	PA	PD	Pts	Qualification
1	Japan	3	3	0	12	3	+9	25	8	+17	655	446	+209	3	Knockout stage
2	Hong Kong	3	2	1	9	6	+3	20	14	+6	582	551	+31	2	Knockout stage
3	Chinese Taipei	3	1	2	9	6	+3	20	13	+7	627	544	+83	1	
4	Pakistan	3	0	3	0	15	−15	0	30	−30	307	630	−323	0	

Source: TournamentSoftware.com

==== Chinese Taipei vs Hong Kong ====
Chinese Taipei
2
Dubai Exhibition Centre - Court 1
14 February 2023, 17:00 UTC+4

Hong Kong
3

			1	2	3
1	(Chinese Taipei) (Hong Kong)	Ye Hong-wei / Lee Chia-hsin; Lee Chun Hei / Ng Tsz Yau	15; 21	15; 21
2	(Chinese Taipei) (Hong Kong)	Chou Tien-chen; Ng Ka Long	13; 21	18; 21
3	(Chinese Taipei) (Hong Kong)	Hsu Wen-chi; Saloni Samirbhai Mehta	15; 21	21; 11	21; 6
4	(Chinese Taipei) (Hong Kong)	Lu Ching-yao / Yang Po-han; Tang Chun Man / Yeung Shing Choi	21; 11	17; 21	21; 23
5	(Chinese Taipei) (Hong Kong)	Hsu Ya-ching / Lin Wan-ching; Fan Ka Yan / Ng Tsz Yau	21; 18	21; 13

==== Japan vs Pakistan ====
Japan
5
Dubai Exhibition Centre - Court 2
14 February 2023, 17:00 UTC+4

Pakistan
0

			1	2	3
1	(Japan) (Pakistan)	Hiroki Midorikawa / Natsu Saito; Muhammad Irfan Saeed Bhatti / Ghazala Saddique	21; 10	21; 11
2	(Japan) (Pakistan)	Natsuki Nidaira; Mahoor Shahzad	21; 4	21; 6
3	(Japan) (Pakistan)	Kodai Naraoka; Murad Ali	21; 8	21; 10
4	(Japan) (Pakistan)	Rin Iwanaga / Kie Nakanishi; Mahoor Shahzad / Ghazala Saddique	21; 7	21; 3
5	(Japan) (Pakistan)	Ayato Endo / Yuta Takei; Murad Ali / Muhammad Irfan Saeed Bhatti	21; 10	21; 15

==== Japan vs Hong Kong ====
Japan
4
Dubai Exhibition Centre - Court 1
15 February 2023, 17:00 UTC+4

Hong Kong
1

			1	2	3
1	(Japan) (Hong Kong)	Koki Watanabe; Lee Cheuk Yiu	22; 20	11; 21	11; 21
2	(Japan) (Hong Kong)	Aya Ohori; Liang Ka Ying	21; 7	21; 9
3	(Japan) (Hong Kong)	Takuro Hoki / Yugo Kobayashi; Law Cheuk Him / Yeung Shing Choi	21; 10	21; 13
4	(Japan) (Hong Kong)	Rena Miyaura / Ayako Sakuramoto; Fan Ka Yan / Yan Mau Ying	21; 9	19; 21	21; 4
5	(Japan) (Hong Kong)	Yuta Watanabe / Arisa Higashino; Lee Chun Hei / Ng Tsz Yau	21; 11	21; 18

==== Chinese Taipei vs Pakistan ====
Chinese Taipei
5
Dubai Exhibition Centre - Court 2
15 February 2023, 17:00 UTC+4

Pakistan
0

			1	2	3
1	(Chinese Taipei) (Pakistan)	Ye Hong-wei / Lee Chia-hsin; Murad Ali / Ghazala Siddique	21; 12	21; 13
2	(Chinese Taipei) (Pakistan)	Chi Yu-jen; Muhammad Irfan Saeed Bhatti	21; 13	21; 15
3	(Chinese Taipei) (Pakistan)	Sung Shuo-yun; Mahoor Shahzad	21; 13	21; 12
4	(Chinese Taipei) (Pakistan)	Su Ching-heng / Ye Hong-wei; Murad Ali / Muhammad Irfan Saeed Bhatti	21; 11	21; 11
5	(Chinese Taipei) (Pakistan)	Lee Chia-hsin / Teng Chun-hsun; Mahoor Shahzad / Ghazala Siddique	21; 9	21; 13

==== Japan vs Chinese Taipei ====
Japan
3
Dubai Exhibition Centre - Court 1
16 February 2023, 13:00 UTC+4

Chinese Taipei
2

			1	2	3
1	(Japan) (Chinese Taipei)	Kodai Naraoka; Chou Tien-chen	14; 21	17; 21
2	(Japan) (Chinese Taipei)	Natsuki Nidaira; Hsu Wen-chi	21; 16	24; 22
3	(Japan) (Chinese Taipei)	Ayato Endo / Yuta Takei; Lu Ching-yao / Yang Po-han	21; 16	21; 17
4	(Japan) (Chinese Taipei)	Rena Miyaura / Ayako Sakuramoto; Chang Ching-hui / Yang Ching-tun	18; 21	21; 10	21; 12
5	(Japan) (Chinese Taipei)	Hiroki Midorikawa / Arisa Higashino; Ye Hong-wei / Lee Chia-hsin	19; 21	17; 21

==== Hong Kong vs Pakistan ====
Hong Kong
5
Dubai Exhibition Centre - Court 3
16 February 2023, 13:00 UTC+4

Pakistan
0

			1	2	3
1	(Hong Kong) (Pakistan)	Tang Chun Man / Tse Ying Suet; Muhammad Irfan Saeed Bhatti / Ghazala Siddique	21; 7	21; 10
2	(Hong Kong) (Pakistan)	Saloni Samirbhai Mehta; Mahoor Shahzad	21; 12	21; 13
3	(Hong Kong) (Pakistan)	Ng Ka Long; Murad Ali	21; 10	21; 11
4	(Hong Kong) (Pakistan)	Lui Lok Lok / Ng Wing Yung; Mahoor Shahzad / Ghazala Siddique	21; 17	21; 3
5	(Hong Kong) (Pakistan)	Chow Hin Long / Lui Chun Wai; Murad Ali / Muhammad Irfan Saeed Bhatti	21; 7	21; 11

== Knockout stage ==
Quarter-finals
China	3
Malaysia	2
India	3
Hong Kong	2
South Korea	3
Indonesia	1
Thailand	3
Japan	2

Semi-finals
China	3
India	2
South Korea	3
Thailand	1

Final
China	3
South Korea	1

=== Quarter-finals ===
==== South Korea vs Indonesia ====
South Korea
3
Dubai Exhibition Centre - Court 1
17 February 2023, 11:00 UTC+4

Indonesia
1

			1	2	3
1	(South Korea) (Indonesia)	Lee Yun-gyu; Chico Aura Dwi Wardoyo	17; 21	16; 21
2	(South Korea) (Indonesia)	Kim Ga-eun; Putri Kusuma Wardani	21; 17	14; 21	21; 12
3	(South Korea) (Indonesia)	Kim Won-ho / Na Sung-seung; Fajar Alfian / Muhammad Rian Ardianto	16; 21	21; 13	21; 16
4	(South Korea) (Indonesia)	Baek Ha-na / Lee So-hee; Apriyani Rahayu / Siti Fadia Silva Ramadhanti	21; 14	21; 9
5	(South Korea) (Indonesia)	Kim Young-hyuk / Lee Yu-lim; Rinov Rivaldy / Pitha Haningtyas Mentari				not played

==== Thailand vs Japan ====
Thailand
3
Dubai Exhibition Centre - Court 2
17 February 2023, 11:00 UTC+4

Japan
2

			1	2	3
1	(Thailand) (Japan)	Sitthikom Thammasin; Koki Watanabe	21; 16	21; 13
2	(Thailand) (Japan)	Busanan Ongbamrungphan; Aya Ohori	21; 19	14; 21	21; 17
3	(Thailand) (Japan)	Pharanyu Kaosamaang / Worrapol Thongsa-Nga; Takuro Hoki / Yugo Kobayashi	17; 21	12; 21
4	(Thailand) (Japan)	Benyapa Aimsaard / Nuntakarn Aimsaard; Rin Iwanaga / Kie Nakanishi	19; 21	17; 21
5	(Thailand) (Japan)	Pakkapon Teeraratsakul / Phataimas Muenwong; Hiroki Midorikawa / Natsu Saito	21; 16	17; 21	21; 14

==== India vs Hong Kong ====
India
3
Dubai Exhibition Centre - Court 1
17 February 2023, 16:00 UTC+4

Hong Kong
2

			1	2	3
1	(India) (Hong Kong)	Ishaan Bhatnagar / Tanisha Crasto; Lee Chun Hei / Ng Tsz Yau	24; 26	17; 21
2	(India) (Hong Kong)	Lakshya Sen; Ng Ka Long	22; 20	19; 21	18; 21
3	(India) (Hong Kong)	Dhruv Kapila / Chirag Shetty; Tang Chun Man / Yeung Shing Choi	20; 22	21; 16	21; 11
4	(India) (Hong Kong)	P. V. Sindhu; Saloni Samirbhai Mehta	16; 21	21; 7	21; 9
5	(India) (Hong Kong)	Treesa Jolly / Gayatri Gopichand; Ng Tsz Yau / Ng Wing Yung	21; 13	21; 12

==== China vs Malaysia ====
China
3
Dubai Exhibition Centre - Court 2
17 February 2023, 16:00 UTC+4

Malaysia
2

			1	2	3
1	(China) (Malaysia)	Lei Lanxi; Lee Zii Jia	16; 21	20; 22
2	(China) (Malaysia)	Gao Fangjie; Goh Jin Wei	15; 21	21; 13	21; 19
3	(China) (Malaysia)	He Jiting / Zhou Haodong; Ong Yew Sin / Teo Ee Yi	24; 22	21; 18
4	(China) (Malaysia)	Liu Shengshu / Tan Ning; Pearly Tan / Thinaah Muralitharan	17; 21	21; 12	19; 21
5	(China) (Malaysia)	Feng Yanzhe / Huang Dongping; Tan Kian Meng / Lai Pei Jing	21; 15	25; 23

=== Semi-finals ===
==== South Korea vs Thailand ====
South Korea
3
Dubai Exhibition Centre - Court 1
18 February 2023, 11:00 UTC+4

Thailand
1

			1	2	3
1	(South Korea) (Thailand)	Cho Geon-yeop; Sitthikom Thammasin	23; 25	21; 19	12; 21
2	(South Korea) (Thailand)	Kim Ga-eun; Supanida Katethong	21; 15	21; 12
3	(South Korea) (Thailand)	Kim Won-ho / Na Sung-seung; Pharanyu Kaosamaang / Worrapol Thongsa-Nga	21; 13	21; 11
4	(South Korea) (Thailand)	Jeong Na-eun / Lee So-hee; Benyapa Aimsaard / Nuntakarn Aimsaard	21; 9	21; 7
5	(South Korea) (Thailand)	Kim Young-hyuk / Lee Yu-lim; Pakkapon Teeraratsakul / Phataimas Muenwong				not played

==== China vs India ====
China
3
Dubai Exhibition Centre - Court 1
18 February 2023, 16:00 UTC+4

India
2

			1	2	3
1	(China) (India)	Lei Lanxi; Prannoy H. S.	21; 13	21; 15
2	(China) (India)	Gao Fangjie; P. V. Sindhu	21; 9	16; 21	21; 18
3	(China) (India)	He Jiting / Zhou Haodong; Dhruv Kapila / Chirag Shetty	19; 21	19; 21
4	(China) (India)	Liu Shengshu / Tan Ning; Treesa Jolly / Gayatri Gopichand	18; 21	21; 13	19; 21
5	(China) (India)	Jiang Zhenbang / Wei Yaxin; Ishaan Bhatnagar / Tanisha Crasto	21; 17	21; 13

=== Final ===
==== China vs South Korea ====
China
3
Dubai Exhibition Centre - Court 1
19 February 2023, 14:00 UTC+4

South Korea
1

			1	2	3
1	(China) (South Korea)	Lei Lanxi; Lee Yun-gyu	21; 16	21; 15
2	(China) (South Korea)	Gao Fangjie; Kim Ga-eun	21; 15	21; 15
3	(China) (South Korea)	He Jiting / Zhou Haodong; Kim Won-ho / Na Sung-seung	21; 19	16; 21	17; 21
4	(China) (South Korea)	Liu Shengshu / Tan Ning; Jeong Na-eun / Lee So-hee	21; 11	21; 10
5	(China) (South Korea)	Feng Yanzhe / Huang Dongping; Kim Young-hyuk / Lee Yu-lim				not played

== Final ranking ==
Pos	Team	Pld	W	L	Pts	MD	GD	PD	Final result
1st place, gold medalist(s)	China	6	6	0	6	+15	+28	+302	Champions
2nd place, silver medalist(s)	South Korea	6	4	2	4	+11	+19	+237	Runners-up
3rd place, bronze medalist(s)	India	5	4	1	4	+13	+23	+261	Eliminated in semi-finals
3rd place, bronze medalist(s)	Thailand	6	4	2	4	+13	+25	+445	Eliminated in semi-finals
5	Indonesia	5	4	1	4	+14	+28	+411	Eliminated in quarter-finals
6	Japan	4	3	1	3	+8	+17	+204	Eliminated in quarter-finals
7	Malaysia	4	2	2	2	+6	+14	+195	Eliminated in quarter-finals
8	Hong Kong	4	2	2	2	+2	+5	−11	Eliminated in quarter-finals
9	Bahrain	4	2	2	2	−4	−11	−179	Eliminated in group stage
10	Chinese Taipei	3	1	2	1	+3	+7	+83	Eliminated in group stage
11	Singapore	3	1	2	1	−5	−6	+22	Eliminated in group stage
12	Syria	4	1	3	1	−6	−9	−168	Eliminated in group stage
13	Kazakhstan	3	1	2	1	−9	−18	−233	Eliminated in group stage
14	United Arab Emirates (H)	3	0	3	0	−11	−22	−229	Eliminated in group stage
15	Pakistan	3	0	3	0	−15	−30	−323	Eliminated in group stage
16	Uzbekistan	3	0	3	0	−15	−30	−439	Eliminated in group stage
17	Lebanon	4	0	4	0	−20	−40	−578	Eliminated in group stage
