= 2023 Badminton Asia Mixed Team Championships squads =

Badminton teams

This article lists the squads lists for badminton's 2023 Badminton Asia Mixed Team Championships. Rankings stated are per tournament prospectus based on BWF World Ranking for 31 January 2023.

== Group A ==
Group A consists of China, South Korea, Singapore and Uzbekistan.

=== China ===
Name	DoB/Age	MS Rank	WS Rank	MD Rank	WD Rank	XD Rank
Zhao Junpeng	2 February 1996 (aged 27)	12	–	–	–	–
Lei Lanxi	25 January 1998 (aged 25)	116	–	–	–	–
Cai Yanyan	15 November 1999 (aged 23)	–	–	–	–	–
Gao Fangjie	29 September 1998 (aged 24)	–	99	–	–	–
He Jiting	19 February 1998 (aged 24)	–	–	20	–	–
Zhou Haodong	20 February 1998 (aged 24)	–	–	20	–	–
Ren Xiangyu	23 October 1998 (aged 24)	–	–	22	–	–
Tan Qiang	16 September 1998 (aged 24)	–	–	22	–	–
Li Yijing	12 January 2002 (aged 21)	–	–	–	115	–
Luo Xumin	5 August 2002 (aged 20)	–	-	–	115	–
Liu Shengshu	8 April 2004 (aged 18)	–	–	–	296	–
Tan Ning	3 April 2003 (aged 19)	–	–	–	296	–
Feng Yanzhe	13 February 2001 (aged 22)	–	–	–	–	24
Huang Dongping	30 April 1995 (aged 27)	–	–	–	512	24
Jiang Zhenbang	28 May 2001 (aged 21)	–	–	–	–	48
Wei Yaxin	18 April 2000 (aged 22)	–	–	–	–	48

=== South Korea ===
Name	DoB/Age	MS Rank	WS Rank	MD Rank	WD Rank	XD Rank
Cho Geon-yeop	1 April 1996 (aged 26)	228	–	–	–	–
Lee Yun-gyu	1 November 1997 (aged 25)	237	–	–	–	–
Sim Yu-jin	13 July 1999 (aged 23)	–	47	–	–	–
Kim Ga-eun	7 February 1998 (aged 25)	–	20	–	–	–
Kim Won-ho	2 June 1999 (aged 23)	–	–	10	–	18
Jin Yong	8 April 2003 (aged 19)	–	–	72	–	142
Na Sung-seung	28 August 1999 (aged 23)	–	-	72	–	110
Jeong Na-eun	27 June 2000 (aged 22)	–	–	–	4	18
Lee So-hee	14 June 1994 (aged 28)	–	–	–	11	–
Baek Ha-na	22 September 2000 (aged 22)	–	–	–	15	136
Lee Yu-lim	27 January 2000 (aged 23)	–	–	–	15	126
Kim Young-hyuk	1 April 1997 (aged 25)	–	–	–	–	126

=== Singapore ===
Name	DoB/Age	MS Rank	WS Rank	MD Rank	WD Rank	XD Rank
Loh Kean Yew	26 June 1997 (aged 25)	8	–	–	–	–
Jason Teh	25 August 2000 (aged 22)	64	–	–	–	–
Yeo Jia Min	1 February 1999 (aged 24)	–	35	–	–	–
Insyirah Khan	12 September 2001 (aged 21)	–	79	–	452	–
Terry Hee	6 July 1995 (aged 27)	–	–	31	–	19
Loh Kean Hean	12 March 1995 (aged 27)	–	–	31	–	–
Andy Kwek	22 April 1999 (aged 23)	–	–	102	–	–
Jin Yujia	6 February 1997 (aged 26)	–	–	–	24	–
Crystal Wong	2 August 1999 (aged 23)	–	–	–	24	–
Jessica Tan	16 July 1993 (aged 29)	–	–	–	–	19

=== Uzbekistan ===
Name	DoB/Age	MS Rank	WS Rank	MD Rank	WD Rank	XD Rank
Abdul Voris Muminov	11 July 2002 (aged 20)	–	–	–	–	–
Abdurashid Muminov	3 August 2002 (aged 20)	–	–	–	–	–
Biloliddin Kuchkarboev	10 July 2001 (aged 21)	–	–	–	–	–
Diana Garamova	4 January 2006 (aged 17)	–	–	–	–	–
Gafforbek Jabborov	17 July 2003 (aged 19)	–	–	–	–	–
Makhbuba Makhmudova	22 May 2005 (aged 17)	–	–	–	–	–
Sevinch Sodikova	2 October 2001 (aged 21)	–	–	–	–	–
Viktoria Rudakova	1 July 1995 (aged 27)	–	–	–	–	–

== Group B ==
Group B consists of Malaysia, India, Kazakhstan and the United Arab Emirates.

=== Malaysia ===
Name	DoB/Age	MS Rank	WS Rank	MD Rank	WD Rank	XD Rank
Lee Zii Jia	29 March 1998 (aged 24)	4	–	–	–	–
Leong Jun Hao	13 July 1999 (aged 23)	66	–	–	–	–
Goh Jin Wei	30 January 2000 (aged 23)	–	29	–	–	443
Wong Ling Ching	7 October 2003 (aged 19)	–	228	–	–	–
Aaron Chia	24 February 1997 (aged 25)	–	–	2	–	–
Soh Wooi Yik	17 February 1998 (aged 24)	–	-	2	–	–
Ong Yew Sin	30 January 1995 (aged 28)	–	–	8	–	89
Teo Ee Yi	4 April 1993 (aged 29)	–	–	8	–	–
Pearly Tan	14 March 2000 (aged 22)	–	–	–	5	–
Thinaah Muralitharan	3 January 1998 (aged 25)	–	–	–	5	–
Tan Kian Meng	1 June 1994 (aged 28)	–	–	39	–	6
Lai Pei Jing	8 August 1992 (aged 30)	–	–	–	–	6
Teoh Mei Xing	16 September 1998 (aged 24)	–	–	–	25	75
Toh Ee Wei	18 September 2000 (aged 22)	–	–	–	–	28
Chen Tang Jie	5 January 1998 (aged 25)	–	–	–	–	54
Go Pei Kee	18 April 2002 (aged 20)	–	–	–	109	219

=== India ===
Name	DoB/Age	MS Rank	WS Rank	MD Rank	WD Rank	XD Rank
Prannoy H. S.	17 July 1992 (aged 30)	9	–	–	–	–
Lakshya Sen	16 August 2001 (aged 21)	11	–	–	–	–
Pusarla Venkata Sindhu	5 July 1995 (aged 27)	–	9	–	–	–
Aakarshi Kashyap	24 August 2001 (aged 21)	–	41	–	–	–
Chirag Shetty	4 July 1997 (aged 25)	–	–	6	–	–
Dhruv Kapila	1 February 2000 (aged 22)	–	–	24	–	258
Krishna Prasad Garaga	15 March 2000 (aged 22)	–	–	34	–	–
Vishnuvardhan Goud Panjala	11 February 2001 (aged 22)	–	–	34	–	–
Gayatri Gopichand	4 March 2003 (aged 19)	–	–	–	19	258
Treesa Jolly	27 May 2003 (aged 19)	–	–	–	19	260
Ashwini Bhat K.	10 January 2000 (aged 23)	–	–	–	34	–
Shikha Gautam	18 April 1998 (aged 24)	–	–	–	34	–
Ishaan Bhatnagar	2 February 2002 (aged 21)	–	–	61	–	26
Tanisha Crasto	5 May 2003 (aged 19)	–	–	–	161	26

=== Kazakhstan ===
Name	DoB/Age	MS Rank	WS Rank	MD Rank	WD Rank	XD Rank
Aisha Zhumabek	7 June 2000 (aged 22)	–	402	–	–	506
Arina Sazonova	23 December 1988 (aged 34)	–	–	–	–	–
Artur Niyazov	30 August 1993 (aged 29)	477	–	237	–	506
Dmitriy Panarin	8 January 2000 (aged 23)	120	–	237	–	565
Kamila Smagulova	14 June 1996 (aged 26)	–	632	–	–	–
Khaitmurat Kulmatov	19 February 1996 (aged 26)	856	–	–	–	–
Makhsut Tadzhibullaev	3 October 2004 (aged 18)	1199	–	–	–	–
Nargiza Rakhmetullayeva	16 July 2004 (aged 18)	–	661	–	–	–

=== United Arab Emirates ===
Name	DoB/Age	MS Rank	WS Rank	MD Rank	WD Rank	XD Rank
Akansha Raj	30 June 2007 (aged 15)	–	–	–	–	–
Aleena Qathun	12 September 2005 (aged 17)	–	–	–	–	–
Bharath Latheesh	12 July 2007 (aged 15)	–	–	–	–	–
Dev Ayyappan	16 January 2006 (aged 17)	–	–	–	–	–
Dev Vishnu	12 June 2006 (aged 16)	–	–	–	–	–
Dhiren Ayyappan	16 January 2006 (aged 17)	–	–	–	–	–
Ghadeer Ali Altahri	9 October 2006 (aged 16)	–	–	–	–	–
Hamid Almazrouei	6 February 2006 (aged 17)	–	–	–	–	–
Madhumitha Sundarapandian	24 May 2007 (aged 15)	–	–	–	–	–
Maryam Alblooshi	28 May 1997 (aged 25)	–	–	–	–	–
Nasser Alsayegh	27 September 2005 (aged 17)	–	–	–	–	–
Nayonika Rajesh	22 January 2005 (aged 18)	–	–	–	–	–
Rishabh Kalidasan	18 July 2008 (aged 14)	–	–	–	–	–
Riyan Malhan	16 May 2010 (aged 12)	–	–	–	–	–
Sanika Dhawan Gurav	23 May 2005 (aged 17)	–	–	–	–	–
Taabia Khan	14 June 2006 (aged 16)	–	–	–	–	–

== Group C ==
Group C consists of Indonesia, Thailand, Bahrain, Syria and Lebanon.

=== Indonesia ===
Name	DoB/Age	MS Rank	WS Rank	MD Rank	WD Rank	XD Rank
Anthony Sinisuka Ginting	11 May 1996 (aged 26)	3	–	–	–	–
Chico Aura Dwi Wardoyo	15 June 1998 (aged 24)	15	–	–	–	–
Gregoria Mariska Tunjung	11 August 1999 (aged 23)	–	14	–	–	–
Putri Kusuma Wardani	20 July 2002 (aged 20)	–	43	–	–	–
Fajar Alfian	7 March 1996 (aged 26)	–	–	1	–	–
Muhammad Rian Ardianto	13 February 1996 (aged 27)	–	–	1	–	–
Pramudya Kusumawardana	13 December 2000 (aged 22)	–	–	21	–	–
Yeremia Rambitan	13 December 2000 (aged 22)	–	–	21	–	–
Apriyani Rahayu	29 April 1998 (aged 24)	–	–	–	8	–
Siti Fadia Silva Ramadhanti	16 November 2000 (aged 22)	–	–	–	8	–
Lanny Tria Mayasari	8 May 2002 (aged 20)	–	–	–	59	–
Ribka Sugiarto	22 January 2000 (aged 23)	–	–	–	59	–
Pitha Haningtyas Mentari	1 July 1999 (aged 23)	–	–	–	–	9
Rinov Rivaldy	12 November 1999 (aged 23)	–	–	–	–	9
Lisa Ayu Kusumawati	15 January 2000 (aged 23)	–	–	–	–	13
Rehan Naufal Kusharjanto	28 February 2000 (aged 22)	–	–	–	–	13

=== Thailand ===
Name	DoB/Age	MS Rank	WS Rank	MD Rank	WD Rank	XD Rank
Benyapa Aimsaard	29 August 2002 (aged 20)	–	–	–	13	–
Busanan Ongbamrungphan	22 March 1996 (aged 26)	–	12	–	–	–
Chasinee Korepap	28 April 2000 (aged 22)	–	–	–	–	92
Laksika Kanlaha	17 December 1997 (aged 25)	–	–	–	110	–
Lalinrat Chaiwan	21 February 2001 (aged 21)	–	30	–	–	–
Nuntakarn Aimsaard	23 May 1999 (aged 23)	–	–	–	13	–
Pakkapon Teeraratsakul	11 November 2004 (aged 18)	–	–	139	–	220
Panitchaphon Teeraratsakul	11 November 2004 (aged 18)	176	–	–	–	–
Peeratchai Sukphun	31 August 2004 (aged 18)	–	–	139	–	–
Pharanyu Kaosamaang	6 March 2003 (aged 19)	–	–	76	–	–
Phataimas Muenwong	5 July 1995 (aged 27)	–	–	–	110	220
Ratchapol Makkasasithorn	1 December 2001 (aged 21)	–	–	–	–	92
Saran Jamsri	20 January 2000 (aged 23)	508	–	–	–	–
Sitthikom Thammasin	7 April 1995 (aged 27)	32	–	–	–	–
Supanida Katethong	26 October 1997 (aged 25)	–	25	–	–	–
Worrapol Thongsa-Nga	29 October 1995 (aged 27)	–	–	76	–	–

=== Bahrain ===
Name	DoB/Age	MS Rank	WS Rank	MD Rank	WD Rank	XD Rank
Adnan Ebrahim	3 July 1998 (aged 24)	291	–	339	–	–
Jaffer Ebrahim	24 January 1985 (aged 38)	–	–	–	–	–
Lizbeth Elsa Binu	21 February 2008 (aged 14)	–	–	–	–	470
Mohamed Muanis	25 December 1999 (aged 23)	–	–	–	–	–
Reya Fathima	10 October 2002 (aged 20)	–	–	–	–	–

=== Syria ===
Name	DoB/Age	MS Rank	WS Rank	MD Rank	WD Rank	XD Rank
Aljallad Ahmad	25 January 1997 (aged 26)	878	–	339	–	–
Amjad Al Fassih	8 April 2000 (aged 22)	–	–	–	–	–
Ranim Alhasbani	5 January 2008 (aged 15)	–	–	–	–	–
Sanaa Mahmoud	31 January 1995 (aged 28)	–	–	–	–	–

=== Lebanon ===
Name	DoB/Age	MS Rank	WS Rank	MD Rank	WD Rank	XD Rank
Abi Younes Christophe	23 April 2003 (aged 19)	–	–	–	–	–
Lynne El-Jabbour	20 July 2006 (aged 16)	–	–	–	–	–
Mira Hussein Agha	26 July 2005 (aged 17)	–	–	–	–	–
Oliver Khoury	17 April 2007 (aged 15)	–	–	–	–	–
Raphael Renno	21 October 2006 (aged 16)	–	–	–	–	–
Zeina Kazma	24 March 2006 (aged 16)	–	–	–	–	–

== Group D ==
Group D consists of Japan, Chinese Taipei, Hong Kong and Pakistan.

=== Japan ===
Name	DoB/Age	MS Rank	WS Rank	MD Rank	WD Rank	XD Rank
Kodai Naraoka	30 June 2001 (aged 21)	7	–	–	–	–
Koki Watanabe	29 January 1999 (aged 24)	43	–	–	–	–
Natsuki Nidaira	12 July 1998 (aged 24)	–	33	–	–	–
Aya Ohori	2 October 1996 (aged 26)	–	34	–	–	–
Takuro Hoki	14 August 1995 (aged 27)	–	–	4	–	–
Yugo Kobayashi	10 July 1995 (aged 27)	–	–	4	–	–
Ayato Endo	19 June 2000 (aged 22)	–	–	43	–	–
Yuta Takei	29 November 2000 (aged 22)	–	–	43	–	–
Rin Iwanaga	21 May 1999 (aged 23)	–	–	–	16	–
Kie Nakanishi	24 December 1995 (aged 27)	–	–	–	16	–
Rena Miyaura	25 July 1995 (aged 27)	–	–	–	72	–
Ayako Sakuramoto	19 August 1995 (aged 27)	–	–	–	72	–
Yuta Watanabe	16 March 1997 (aged 25)	–	–	–	–	2
Arisa Higashino	1 August 1996 (aged 26)	–	–	–	–	2
Hiroki Midorikawa	17 May 2000 (aged 22)	–	–	–	–	25
Natsu Saito	9 June 2000 (aged 22)	–	–	–	–	25

=== Chinese Taipei ===
Name	DoB/Age	MS Rank	WS Rank	MD Rank	WD Rank	XD Rank
Chang Ching-hui	17 May 1996 (aged 26)	–	–	–	46	–
Chi Yu-jen	25 June 1997 (aged 25)	68	–	–	–	–
Chou Tien-chen	8 January 1990 (aged 33)	5	–	–	–	–
Hsu Wen-chi	28 September 1997 (aged 25)	–	17	–	–	–
Hsu Ya-ching	30 July 1991 (aged 31)	–	–	–	41	–
Lee Chia-hsin	11 May 1997 (aged 25)	–	–	–	30	23
Lin Wan-ching	1 November 1995 (aged 27)	–	–	–	41	–
Lu Ching-yao	7 June 1993 (aged 29)	–	–	14	–	–
Su Ching-heng	10 November 1992 (aged 30)	–	–	42	–	–
Sung Shuo-yun	15 June 1997 (aged 25)	–	36	–	–	–
Teng Chun-hsun	27 September 2000 (aged 22)	–	–	–	30	–
Yang Ching-tun	17 November 1995 (aged 27)	–	–	–	46	–
Yang Po-han	13 March 1994 (aged 28)	–	–	14	–	–
Ye Hong-wei	1 November 1999 (aged 23)	–	–	42	–	23

=== Hong Kong ===
Name	DoB/Age	MS Rank	WS Rank	MD Rank	WD Rank	XD Rank
Chow Hin Long	6 April 2000 (aged 22)	–	–	95	–	331
Fan Ka Yan	27 January 1997 (aged 26)	–	–	–	158	158
Law Cheuk Him	26 June 1994 (aged 28)	–	–	78	–	87
Lee Cheuk Yiu	28 August 1996 (aged 26)	21	–	–	–	–
Lee Chun Hei	25 January 1994 (aged 29)	–	–	78	–	21
Liang Ka Wing	19 June 2005 (aged 17)	–	–	–	–	–
Lui Chun Wai	10 January 2001 (aged 22)	–	–	95	–	174
Lui Lok Lok	22 September 2002 (aged 20)	–	–	–	196	277
Ng Ka Long	24 June 1994 (aged 28)	18	–	–	–	–
Ng Tsz Yau	24 April 1998 (aged 24)	–	–	–	36	21
Ng Wing Yung	17 May 1995 (aged 27)	–	–	–	196	53
Saloni Samirbhai Mehta	27 August 2002 (aged 20)	–	257	–	–	–
Tang Chun Man	20 March 1995 (aged 27)	–	–	–	–	20
Tse Ying Suet	9 November 1991 (aged 31)	–	–	–	–	20
Yau Mau Ying	24 October 1999 (aged 23)	–	–	–	158	–
Yeung Shing Choi	21 March 1996 (aged 26)	–	–	–	–	158

=== Pakistan ===
Name	DoB/Age	MS Rank	WS Rank	MD Rank	WD Rank	XD Rank
Ghazala Saddique	12 April 1994 (aged 28)	–	–	–	–	–
Mahoor Shahzad	17 October 1996 (aged 26)	–	–	–	–	–
Muhammad Irfan Saeed Bhatti	18 November 1992 (aged 30)	–	–	–	–	–
Murad Ali	7 April 1991 (aged 31)	–	–	–	–	–
