= Badminton at the 2004 Arab Games =

- Venue: Mokhtar-Aribi Hall
- Location: El Biar, Algiers, Algeria
- Dates: 26 September – 4 October 2004

Badminton was contested at the 2004 Arab Games. The events were held at the Mokhtar-Aribi Hall in El Biar, Algiers, Algeria from 26 September to 4 October 2004.

Syria dominated the medal table for a second consecutive time, winning five golds, a silver and a bronze. The host team, Algeria finished second on the medal table, winning a gold, two silvers and a bronze.

Algeria won their first gold medal in badminton in the Games when men's doubles pair Karim Rezig and Zeradine Ammar defeated Tariq Mansour Elfawair and Rami Al-Sheikh in the final. Egypt also won their first gold in the Games when the women's team finished first in the women's team event.

== Medal table ==
* Host nation (Algeria)

Rank	NOC	Gold	Silver	Bronze	Total
1	Syria (SYR)	5	1	2	8
2	Algeria (ALG)*	1	2	1	4
3	Egypt (EGY)	1	0	5	6
4	Jordan (JOR)	0	3	2	5
5	Iraq (IRQ)	0	0	2	2
Totals (5 entries)		7	6	12	25

=== Medalists ===
Event	Gold	Silver	Bronze
Men's singles	Syria; Tareq Shalhoum	Jordan; Tariq Mansour Elfawair	Syria; Bassel Al-Durrah
Men's singles	Syria; Tareq Shalhoum	Jordan; Tariq Mansour Elfawair	Egypt; Kareem Shedeed
Men's doubles	Algeria; Karim Rezig; Ammar Zeradine	Jordan; Tariq Mansour Elfawair; Rami Al-Sheikh	Iraq; Saleh Mehdi; Wisam Salah
Men's doubles	Algeria; Karim Rezig; Ammar Zeradine	Jordan; Tariq Mansour Elfawair; Rami Al-Sheikh	Egypt; Yehya Aldel Kader; Tamar Raafat
Men's team	Syria; Tareq Shalhoum; Bassel Al-Durrah; Nawras Abdul Wahid; Hayel Kareem	Algeria; Karim Rezig; Ammar Zeradine; Kamel Haroun; Salim Belmahi	Jordan; Tariq Mansour Elfawair; Rami Al-Sheikh; Omar Hani Bani; Muntaser Elnabani
Women's singles	Syria; Hadil Kareem	Jordan; Razane Kaled Alkhalife	Syria; Eva Katrib
Women's singles	Syria; Hadil Kareem	Jordan; Razane Kaled Alkhalife	Egypt; Hadia Hosny
Women's doubles	Syria; Eva Katrib; Hadil Kareem	Jordan; Razane Kaled Alkhalife; Rawan Ghazi	Egypt; Dina Nagy; Sandy Nagy
Women's doubles	Syria; Eva Katrib; Hadil Kareem	Jordan; Razane Kaled Alkhalife; Rawan Ghazi	Algeria; Malika Menaceri; Sara Naidji
Women's team	Egypt; Alaa Youssef; Sandy Nagy; Hadia Hosny; Dina Nagy	Syria; Eva Katrib; Hadil Kareem; Bushra Muhawesh	Jordan; Razane Kaled Alkhalife; Rawan Ghazi; Dina Abu Zaid; Najwa Al-Turk
Mixed doubles	Syria; Bassel Al-Durrah; Eva Katrib	Algeria; Ammar Zeradine; Malika Menaceri	Egypt; Kareem Shedeed; Alaa Youssef
Mixed doubles	Syria; Bassel Al-Durrah; Eva Katrib	Algeria; Ammar Zeradine; Malika Menaceri	Iraq; Saleh Mehdi; Etihad Kamel

== Participating nations ==
A total of 6 nations competed in badminton at the 2004 Arab Games:

- Algeria
- Bahrain
- Egypt
- Iraq
- Jordan
- Syria
