= 2004 Thomas Cup qualification =

Tournament details
- Dates: January 31, 2004 – February 25, 2004
- Venue: BA: Kuala Lumpur Badminton Stadium; BCA: Pretoria Showgrounds; BE: Mestská Hala; BO: Ken Kay Badminton Stadium; BPA: Sir Garfield Sobers Gymnasium
- Location: BA: Kuala Lumpur, Malaysia; BCA: Pretoria, South Africa; BE: Prešov, Slovakia; BO: Ballarat, Australia; BPA: Bridgetown, Barbados

The 2004 Thomas Cup qualification process is a series of tournaments organised by the five IBF confederations to decide 11 of the 12 teams which will play in the 2004 Thomas Cup, with Indonesia qualifying automatically as hosts and trophy holders.

== Qualified teams ==
Country	Confederation	Qualified as	Qualified on	Final appearance
Indonesia	Badminton Asia	2002 Thomas Cup winners, 2004 Thomas Cup hosts	August 2003	20th
China	Badminton Asia	2004 Badminton Asia Thomas Cup Preliminaries winners	22 February 2004	12th
South Africa	Badminton Africa	2004 Thomas Cup Preliminaries for Africa winners	25 February 2004	Debut
Malaysia	Badminton Asia	2004 Badminton Asia Thomas Cup Preliminaries runners-up	22 February 2004	20th
South Korea	Badminton Asia	2004 Badminton Asia Thomas Cup Preliminaries semifinalists	21 February 2004	11th
Japan	Badminton Asia	2004 Badminton Asia Thomas Cup Preliminaries semifinalists	21 February 2004	7th
Thailand	Badminton Asia	Fifth place at the 2004 Badminton Asia Thomas Cup Preliminaries	22 February 2004	9th
Denmark	Badminton Europe	2004 European Thomas Cup Preliminaries winners	15 February 2004	23rd
Germany	Badminton Europe	2004 European Thomas Cup Preliminaries runners-up	15 February 2004	2nd
England	Badminton Europe	2004 European Thomas Cup Preliminaries third place	15 February 2004	8th
New Zealand	Badminton Oceania	2004 Thomas Cup Preliminaries for Oceania winners	1 February 2004	Debut
United States	Badminton Pan Am	2004 Pan American Thomas Cup Preliminaries winners	21 February 2004	7th

== Qualification process ==
The number of teams participating in the final tournament is 12. The allocation of slots for each confederation are 4 from Asia, 3 from Europe, and 1 from each Africa, Oceania and Pan Am. Two automatic qualifiers are the host and defending champion.

== Confederation qualification ==
=== Badminton Confederation of Africa ===
The qualification for the African teams was held from 23 to 25 February 2004, at Pretoria Showgrounds in Pretoria, South Africa. The winners of the African qualification will qualify for the Thomas Cup.

==== Teams in contention ====
- Botswana
- Mauritius
- Nigeria
- South Africa
- Swaziland
- Uganda
- Zambia

==== Round-robin ====
Pos	Team	Pld	Pts
1	South Africa	6	6
2	Nigeria	6	5
3	Mauritius	6	4
4	Uganda	6	3
5	Zambia	6	2
6	Botswana	6	1
7	Swaziland	6	0

Source: L'Express

=== Badminton Asia ===
The qualification for the Asian teams was held from 17 to 22 February 2004, at the Kuala Lumpur Badminton Stadium in Kuala Lumpur, Malaysia. The semi-finalists of the Asian qualification will qualify for the Thomas Cup. The team that finishes 5th in the classification rounds will also earn a spot in the final tournament.

==== Teams in contention ====
Teams qualified for the Group stage

- China
- Chinese Taipei
- Hong Kong
- India
- Iran
- Japan
- Macau
- Malaysia
- Pakistan
- Singapore
- South Korea
- Sri Lanka
- Thailand
- Vietnam

==== First round (group stage) ====
Advance to Knockout stage
Advance to Classification round

Group A
Group B

Pos	Team	Pld	Pts
1	South Korea	3	3
2	India	3	2
3	Iran	3	1
4	Macau	3	0

Source: BadmintonCN

Pos	Team	Pld	Pts
1	Malaysia	2	2
2	Hong Kong	2	1
3	Sri Lanka	2	0

Source: BadmintonCN
Group C
Group D

Pos	Team	Pld	Pts
1	Japan	2	2
2	Singapore	2	1
3	Pakistan	2	0

Source: BadmintonCN

Pos	Team	Pld	Pts
1	China	3	3
2	Thailand	3	2
3	Chinese Taipei	3	1
4	Vietnam	3	0

Source: BadmintonCN

==== Classification round ====
7th place
A2	India	0
B2	Hong Kong	3
C2	Singapore	0
D2	Thailand	3

5th place
B2	Hong Kong	2
D2	Thailand	3

==== Knockout stage ====
Semi-finals
A1	South Korea	0
B1	Malaysia	3
C1	Japan	0
D1	China	3

Final
D1	China	3
B1	Malaysia	2
Third place
A1	South Korea	3
C1	Japan	0

=== Badminton Europe ===
The qualification for the European teams was held from 10 to 15 February 2004, at the Mestská Hala in Prešov, Slovakia. The semi-finalists of the European qualification will qualify for the Thomas Cup.

==== Teams in contention ====
Teams qualified for the Group stage

- Austria
- Belarus
- Belgium
- Bulgaria
- Cyprus
- Czech Republic
- Denmark
- England
- Estonia
- Finland
- France
- Germany
- Greece
- Hungary
- Iceland
- Ireland
- Israel
- Latvia
- Lithuania
- Moldova
- Netherlands
- Norway
- Poland
- Portugal
- Russia
- Scotland
- Slovakia
- Slovenia
- Spain
- Sweden
- Switzerland
- Turkey
- Ukraine
- Wales

==== First round (group stage) ====
Advance to Knockout stage

Group A
Group B
Group C

Pos	Team	Pld	Pts
1	Denmark	3	3
2	Portugal	3	2
3	Slovenia	3	1
4	Switzerland	3	0

Source: tuc.presov.sk

Pos	Team	Pld	Pts
1	Germany	3	3
2	Scotland	3	2
3	Greece	3	1
4	Latvia	3	0

Source: tuc.presov.sk

Pos	Team	Pld	Pts
1	England	3	3
2	Bulgaria	3	2
3	Czech Republic	3	1
4	Moldova	3	0

Source: tuc.presov.sk
Group D
Group E
Group F

Pos	Team	Pld	Pts
1	Ukraine	3	3
2	Spain	3	2
3	Estonia	3	1
4	Israel	3	0

Source: tuc.presov.sk

Pos	Team	Pld	Pts
1	France	3	3
2	Finland	3	2
3	Ireland	3	1
4	Belarus	3	0

Source: tuc.presov.sk

Pos	Team	Pld	Pts
1	Sweden	2	2
2	Norway	2	1
3	Lithuania	2	0

Source: tuc.presov.sk
Group G
Group H
Group K

Pos	Team	Pld	Pts
1	Poland	3	3
2	Iceland	3	2
3	Cyprus	3	1
4	Slovakia (H)	3	0

Source: tuc.presov.sk
(H) Host

Pos	Team	Pld	Pts
1	Russia	3	3
2	Belgium	3	2
3	Hungary	3	1
4	Turkey	3	0

Source: tuc.presov.sk

Pos	Team	Pld	Pts
1	Netherlands	2	2
2	Wales	2	1
3	Austria	2	0

Source: tuc.presov.sk

==== Second round (knockout stage) ====
Second round
K1	Netherlands	3
F1	Sweden	1

Quarter-finals
A1	Denmark	3
K1	Netherlands	0
G1	Poland	3
D1	Ukraine	1
C1	England	3
H1	Russia	1
B1	Germany	3
E1	France	0

Semi-finals
A1	Denmark	3
G1	Poland	0
C1	England	2
B1	Germany	3

Final
A1	Denmark	3
B1	Germany	0
Third place
G1	Poland	1
C1	England	3

=== Badminton Oceania ===
The qualification for the Oceanian teams was held from 31 January to 1 February 2004, at the Ken Kay Badminton Stadium in Ballarat, Australia. The winner of the Oceania qualification will qualify for the Thomas Cup.

==== Teams in contention ====
- Australia
- New Zealand

==== Play-off ====
Team 1	Score	Team 2
New Zealand	4–1	Australia

=== Badminton Pan Am ===
The qualification for the Pan Am teams was held from 17 to 21 February 2004, at the Sir Garfield Sobers Gymnasium in Bridgetown, Barbados. The winner of the Pan Am qualification will qualify for the Thomas Cup.

==== Teams in contention ====
Teams qualified for the Group stage

- Barbados
- Brazil
- Canada
- Guatemala
- Mexico
- ~~Suriname~~ (withdrew)
- Trinidad and Tobago
- United States

==== First round (group stage) ====
Advance to Knockout stage

Group A

Pos	Team	Pld	Pts
1	United States	3	3
2	Brazil	3	2
3	Mexico	3	1
4	Trinidad and Tobago	3	0

Source: TournamentSoftware
Group B

Pos	Team	Pld	Pts
1	Canada	2	2
2	Guatemala	2	1
3	Barbados	2	0

Source: TournamentSoftware

==== Second round (knockout stage) ====
Semi-finals
17 February
United States	3
Guatemala	1
17 February
Brazil	0
Canada	3

Final
18 February
United States	3
Canada	1
Third place
18 February
Guatemala	3
Brazil	0
