= 2004 Uber Cup qualification =

Tournament details
- Dates: January 31, 2004 – February 25, 2004
- Venue: BA: Kuala Lumpur Badminton Stadium; BCA: Pretoria Showgrounds; BE: Mestská Hala; BO: Ken Kay Badminton Stadium; BPA: Sir Garfield Sobers Gymnasium
- Location: BA: Kuala Lumpur, Malaysia; BCA: Pretoria, South Africa; BE: Prešov, Slovakia; BO: Ballarat, Australia; BPA: Bridgetown, Barbados

The 2004 Uber Cup qualification process is a series of tournaments organised by the five IBF confederations to decide 10 of the 12 teams which will play in the 2004 Uber Cup, with Indonesia qualifying automatically as hosts and China as trophy holders.

== Qualified teams ==
Country	Confederation	Qualified as	Qualified on	Final appearance
Indonesia	Badminton Asia	2004 Uber Cup hosts	August 2003	18th
China	Badminton Asia	2002 Uber Cup winners	18 May 2002	11th
South Africa	Badminton Africa	2006 Uber Cup Preliminaries for Africa winners	25 February 2004	Debut
South Korea	Badminton Asia	2004 Badminton Asia Uber Cup Preliminaries winners	22 February 2004	11th
Chinese Taipei	Badminton Asia	2004 Badminton Asia Uber Cup Preliminaries runners-up	18 February 2004	Debut
Japan	Badminton Asia	2004 Badminton Asia Uber Cup Preliminaries semifinalists	21 February 2004	17th
Malaysia	Badminton Asia	2004 Badminton Asia Uber Cup Preliminaries semifinalists	21 February 2006	8th
Denmark	Badminton Europe	2004 European Uber Cup Preliminaries winners	15 February 2004	14th
Germany	Badminton Europe	2004 European Uber Cup Preliminaries runners-up	15 February 2004	2nd
Netherlands	Badminton Europe	2004 European Uber Cup Preliminaries third place	15 February 2004	7th
Australia	Badminton Oceania	2004 Uber Cup Preliminaries for Oceania winners	1 February 2004	3rd
Canada	Badminton Pan Am	2006 Pan American Uber Cup Preliminaries winners	21 February 2004	9th

== Qualification process ==
The number of teams participating in the final tournament is 12. The allocation of slots for each confederation are 4 from Asia, 3 from Europe, and 1 from each Africa, Oceania and Pan Am. Two automatic qualifiers are the host and defending champion.

== Confederation qualification ==
=== Badminton Confederation of Africa ===
The qualification for the African teams was held from 23 to 25 February 2004, at Pretoria Showgrounds in Pretoria, South Africa. The winners of the African qualification will qualify for the Thomas Cup.

==== Teams in contention ====
- Botswana
- Mauritius
- Nigeria
- South Africa
- Swaziland
- Uganda
- Zambia

==== Round-robin ====
Pos	Team	Pld	Pts
1	South Africa	6	6
2	Mauritius	6	5
3	Nigeria	6	4
4	Uganda	6	3
5	Zambia	6	2
6	Botswana	6	1
7	Swaziland	6	0

Source: L'Express

=== Badminton Asia ===
The qualification for the Asian teams was held from 17 to 22 February 2004, at the Kuala Lumpur Badminton Stadium in Kuala Lumpur, Malaysia. The semi-finalists of the Asian qualification will qualify for the Uber Cup.

==== Teams in contention ====
Teams qualified for the Group stage

- Chinese Taipei
- Hong Kong
- India
- Japan
- Macau
- Malaysia
- South Korea
- Thailand
- Vietnam

==== First round (group stage) ====
Advance to Knockout stage
Advance to Classification round

Group X

Pos	Team	Pld	Pts
1	Japan	4	4
2	Malaysia	4	3
3	India	4	2
4	Hong Kong	4	1
5	Macau	4	0

Source: BadmintonCN
Group Y

Pos	Team	Pld	Pts
1	South Korea	3	3
2	Chinese Taipei	3	2
3	Thailand	3	1
4	Vietnam	3	0

Source: BadmintonCN

==== Knockout stage ====
Semi-finals
X1	Japan	0
Y2	Chinese Taipei	3
Y1	South Korea	3
X2	Malaysia	1

Final
Y2	Chinese Taipei	1
Y1	South Korea	3
Third place
X1	Japan	3
X2	Malaysia	1

=== Badminton Europe ===
The qualification for the European teams was held from 10 to 15 February 2004, at the Mestská Hala in Prešov, Slovakia. The semi-finalists of the European qualification will qualify for the Uber Cup.

==== Teams in contention ====
Teams qualified for the Group stage

- Armenia
- Austria
- Bulgaria
- Cyprus
- Czech Republic
- Denmark
- England
- Estonia
- Finland
- France
- Germany
- Greece
- Hungary
- Iceland
- Ireland
- Latvia
- Lithuania
- Netherlands
- Norway
- Portugal
- Romania
- Russia
- Scotland
- Slovakia
- Slovenia
- Spain
- Sweden
- Switzerland
- Turkey
- Ukraine
- Wales

==== First round (group stage) ====
Advance to Knockout stage

Group A
Group B
Group C

Pos	Team	Pld	Pts
1	Netherlands	3	3
2	Scotland	3	2
3	Latvia	3	1
4	Ireland	3	0

Source: tuc.presov.sk

Pos	Team	Pld	Pts
1	Denmark	2	2
2	Austria	2	1
3	Hungary	2	0

Source: tuc.presov.sk

Pos	Team	Pld	Pts
1	Germany	3	3
2	Iceland	3	2
3	Norway	3	1
4	Greece	3	0

Source: tuc.presov.sk
Group D
Group E
Group F

Pos	Team	Pld	Pts
1	England	3	3
2	Slovenia	3	2
3	Portugal	3	1
4	Slovakia (H)	3	0

Source: tuc.presov.sk
(H) Host

Pos	Team	Pld	Pts
1	France	3	3
2	Switzerland	3	2
3	Spain	3	1
4	Lithuania	3	0

Source: tuc.presov.sk

Pos	Team	Pld	Pts
1	Sweden	3	3
2	Ukraine	3	2
3	Estonia	3	1
4	Romania	3	0

Source: tuc.presov.sk
Group G
Group H

Pos	Team	Pld	Pts
1	Russia	3	3
2	Wales	3	2
3	Turkey	3	1
4	Armenia	3	0

Source: tuc.presov.sk

Pos	Team	Pld	Pts
1	Bulgaria	3	3
2	Finland	3	2
3	Czech Republic	3	1
4	Cyprus	3	0

Source: tuc.presov.sk

==== Second round (knockout stage) ====
Quarter-finals
B1	Denmark	3
H1	Bulgaria	0
D1	England	3
F1	Sweden	0
A1	Netherlands	3
G1	Russia	0
C1	Germany	3
E1	France	0

Semi-finals
B1	Denmark	3
D1	England	0
A1	Netherlands	1
C1	Germany	3

Final
B1	Denmark	3
C1	Germany	2
Third place
D1	England	0
A1	Netherlands	3

=== Badminton Oceania ===
The qualification for the Oceanian teams was held from 31 January to 1 February 2004, at the Ken Kay Badminton Stadium in Ballarat, Australia. The winner of the Oceania qualification will qualify for the Uber Cup.

==== Teams in contention ====
- Australia
- New Zealand

==== Play-off ====
Team 1	Score	Team 2
New Zealand	1–4	Australia

=== Badminton Pan Am ===
The qualification for the Pan Am teams was held from 17 to 21 February 2004, at the Sir Garfield Sobers Gymnasium in Bridgetown, Barbados. The winner of the Pan Am qualification will qualify for the Uber Cup.

==== Teams in contention ====
- Barbados
- Canada
- Guatemala
- Peru
- United States

==== Round-robin ====
Pos	Team	Pld	Pts
1	Canada	4	4
2	United States	4	3
3	Peru	4	2
4	Guatemala	4	1
5	Barbados	4	0

Source: TournamentSoftware
