= 1963 Uber Cup qualification =

Tournament details
- Dates: 29 September 1962 – 18 February 1963
- Location: Asian zone: Bangkok; Hong Kong; European zone: Dublin; Glasgow

The qualifying process for the 1963 Uber Cup took place from 29 September 1962 to 18 February 1963 to decide the final teams which will play in the final tournament.

== Qualification process ==
The qualification process is divided into four regions, the Asian Zone, the American Zone, the European Zone and the Australasian Zone. Teams in their respective zone will compete in a knockout format. Three singles and four doubles will be played on the day of competition. The teams that win their respective zone will earn a place in the final tournament to be held in Wilmington, United States.

The winners of the 1960 Uber Cup, the United States were exempted from the qualifying rounds and automatically qualified for the challenge round. Therefore, Canada automatically qualified for the final tournament since there was no other opponent in the American zone qualifiers.

=== Qualified teams ===
Country	Qualified as	Qualified on	Final appearance
United States	1960 Uber Cup winners	9 April 1960	3rd
Indonesia	Asian Zone winners	December 1962	1st
England	European Zone winners	18 February 1963	1st
Canada	Sole representative of the American Zone	March 1962	2nd
New Zealand	Australasian Zone winners	September 1962	3rd

== Asian Zone ==
=== Bracket ===
Semi-finals
30 September 1962 – Bangkok
Thailand	3
Indonesia	4
29 September 1962 – Hong Kong
Hong Kong	2
India	5

Final
December 1962
Indonesia	w/o
India

=== Semi-finals ===
Thailand
3
Bangkok, Thailand
30 September 1962

Indonesia
4

			1	2	3
1	(Thailand) (Indonesia)	Boopha Kaenthong; Minarni	1; 11	7; 11
2	(Thailand) (Indonesia)	Pratuang Pattabongse; Corry Kawilarang	3; 11	11; 2	12; 10
3	(Thailand) (Indonesia)	Sumol Chanklum; Happy Herowati	9; 12	11; 6	11; 3
4	(Thailand) (Indonesia)	Sumol Chanklum / Pankae Phongarn; Happy Herowati / Corry Kawilarang	16; 18	7; 15
5	(Thailand) (Indonesia)	Uchanee Mahakanok / Pratuang Pattabongse; Retno Koestijah / Minarni	12; 15	16; 18
6	(Thailand) (Indonesia)	Uchanee Mahakanok / Pratuang Pattabongse; Happy Herowati / Corry Kawilarang	18; 16	11; 15	15; 8
7	(Thailand) (Indonesia)	Sumol Chanklum / Pankae Phongarn; Retno Koestijah / Minarni	3; 15	9; 15

India
5
Hong Kong
29 September 1962

Hong Kong
2

			1	2	3
1	(India) (Hong Kong)	Meena Shah; Tsui Yuen Chun	12; 9	11; 3
2	(India) (Hong Kong)	Prem Prashar; Lam Oi Chun	11; 5	11; 1
3	(India) (Hong Kong)	Jasbir Kaur; Cynder Ho	11; 5	2; 11	1; 11
4	(India) (Hong Kong)	Manda Kelkar / Prem Prashar; Chan Wai Fun / Tsui Yuen Chun	15; 1	15; 5
5	(India) (Hong Kong)	Jasbir Kaur / Meena Shah; Cynder Ho / Chan Yuen Yue	15; 6	15; 5
6	(India) (Hong Kong)	Jasbir Kaur / Meena Shah; Chan Wai Fun / Tsui Yuen Chun	15; 11	15; 12
7	(India) (Hong Kong)	Manda Kelkar / Prem Prashar; Cynder Ho / Chan Yuen Yue				w/o

=== Final ===
The final match between Indonesia and India was cancelled as India conceded a walkover. Therefore, Indonesia automatically qualified for the Uber Cup finals for the first time.

== European Zone ==
=== Bracket ===
Semi-finals
16 January 1963 – Glasgow
Ireland	4
Scotland	3
Bye
England

Final
18 February 1963 – Dublin
Ireland	1
England	6

=== Semi-finals ===
Ireland
4
Glasgow, Scotland
16 January 1963

Scotland
3

			1	2	3
1	(Republic of Ireland) (Scotland)	Mary O'Sullivan; Muriel Ferguson	11; 4	11; 5
2	(Republic of Ireland) (Scotland)	Yvonne Kelly; M. Macleod	11; 5	11; 4
3	(Republic of Ireland) (Scotland)	Susan Peard; D. G. Calder	1; 11	11; 5	11; 12
4	(Republic of Ireland) (Scotland)	Yvonne Kelly / Mary O'Sullivan; D. G. Calder / M. Macleod	15; 5	15; 4
5	(Republic of Ireland) (Scotland)	Lena McAleese / Susan Peard; Catherine Dunglison / Muriel Ferguson	14; 17	11; 15
6	(Republic of Ireland) (Scotland)	Lena McAleese / Susan Peard; D. G. Calder / M. Macleod	15; 12	17; 14
7	(Republic of Ireland) (Scotland)	Yvonne Kelly / Mary O'Sullivan; Catherine Dunglison / Muriel Ferguson	15; 5	10; 15	6; 15

=== Final ===
England
6
Dublin, Ireland
18 February 1963

Ireland
1

			1	2	3
1	(England) (Republic of Ireland)	Ursula Smith; Mary O'Sullivan	11; 8	11; 8
2	(England) (Republic of Ireland)	Iris Rogers; Yvonne Kelly	11; 12	11; 2	6; 11
3	(England) (Republic of Ireland)	Angela Bairstow; Susan Peard	11; 3	11; 1
4	(England) (Republic of Ireland)	Brenda Parr / Jenny Pritchard; Lena McAleese / Susan Peard	15; 11	15; 7
5	(England) (Republic of Ireland)	Margaret Barrand / Ursula Smith; Yvonne Kelly / Mary O'Sullivan	15; 7	15; 11
6	(England) (Republic of Ireland)	Margaret Barrand / Ursula Smith; Lena McAleese / Susan Peard	15; 12	15; 5
7	(England) (Republic of Ireland)	Brenda Parr / Jenny Pritchard; Yvonne Kelly / Jane Kempster	15; 3	18; 13

== Australasian Zone ==
=== Bracket ===
Final
September 1962
New Zealand	w/o
Australia

=== Final ===
The Australasian Zone final was not played due to Australia conceding a walkover to New Zealand. New Zealand qualified for the final tournament.
