= Armenia national badminton team =

National badminton team representing Armenia

Armenia
- Association: Badminton Federation of Armenia (BFA)
- Confederation: BE (Europe)
- President: Hovhannes Khachatryan

BWF ranking
- Current ranking: Unranked (2 January 2024)
- Highest ranking: 88 (2 July 2015)

Sudirman Cup
- Appearances: 1 (first in 1997)
- Best result: Group stage (1997)

European Men's Team Championships
- Appearances: 1 (first in 2006)
- Best result: Group stage

European Women's Team Championships
- Appearances: 1 (first in 2004)
- Best result: Group stage

The Armenia national badminton team (Armenian: Հայաստանի բադմինտոնի ազգային հավաքական) represents Armenia in international badminton team competitions. The national team is controlled by the Badminton Federation of Armenia, the governing body of Armenian badminton. Armenia competed in the Sudirman Cup in 1989 and 1991 as part of the Soviet Union national badminton team.

The Armenian junior team also participated in the BWF World Junior Championships mixed team event, also known as the Suhandinata Cup.

== History ==
Badminton was first played in Armenia in the 1980s when it was still under Soviet rule. After Armenia gained independence following the dissolution of the Soviet Union in 1991, the Badminton Federation of Armenia was established which then formed the national team in 1992. Armenia made its first international team appearance at the 1997 Sudirman Cup.

=== Men's team ===
The Armenian men's team competed in the 2006 European Men's Team Badminton Championship. The team were placed into Group 1 with Denmark, Ireland and Iceland. The team lost all matches against Denmark and Ireland but managed to win a match against Iceland.

=== Mixed team ===
The Armenian mixed team debuted in the Sudirman Cup in 1997. The team were placed into Group 8 with Lithuania, Estonia, Greece and Chile to compete for 55th to 59th place. The Armenian team lost 5–0 to Lithuania and Estonia but won narrowly against Greece and Chile to earn themselves 57th place on the overall standings.

== Competitive record ==
=== Thomas Cup ===
Year	Round	Pos
1949	Part of the Soviet Union	
1952	Part of the Soviet Union	
1955	Part of the Soviet Union	
1958	Part of the Soviet Union	
1961	Part of the Soviet Union	
1964	Part of the Soviet Union	
1967	Part of the Soviet Union	
1970	Part of the Soviet Union	
1973	Part of the Soviet Union	
1976	Part of the Soviet Union	
1979	Part of the Soviet Union	
1982	Part of the Soviet Union	
1984	Part of the Soviet Union	
1986	Part of the Soviet Union	
1988	Part of the Soviet Union	
1990	Part of the Soviet Union	
1992	Part of the CIS	
1994	Did not enter	
1996	Did not qualify	
1998	Did not enter	
2000	Did not enter	
2002	Did not enter	
2004	Did not enter	
2006	Did not qualify	
2008	Did not enter	
2010	Did not enter	
2012	Did not enter	
2014	Did not enter	
2016	Did not enter	
2018	Did not enter	
2020	Did not enter	
2022	Did not enter	
2024	Did not enter	
2026	Did not enter	
2028	TBD	
2030	TBD	

=== Uber Cup ===
Year	Round	Pos
1957	Part of the Soviet Union	
1960	Part of the Soviet Union	
1963	Part of the Soviet Union	
1966	Part of the Soviet Union	
1969	Part of the Soviet Union	
1972	Part of the Soviet Union	
1975	Part of the Soviet Union	
1978	Part of the Soviet Union	
1981	Part of the Soviet Union	
1984	Part of the Soviet Union	
1986	Part of the Soviet Union	
1988	Part of the Soviet Union	
1990	Part of the Soviet Union	
1992	Part of the CIS	
1994	Did not enter	
1996	Did not enter	
1998	Did not enter	
2000	Did not enter	
2002	Did not enter	
2004	Did not qualify	
2006	Did not enter	
2008	Did not enter	
2010	Did not enter	
2012	Did not enter	
2014	Did not enter	
2016	Did not enter	
2018	Did not enter	
2020	Did not enter	
2022	Did not enter	
2024	TBD	
2026	TBD	
2028	TBD	
2030	TBD	

=== Sudirman Cup ===
Year	Round	Pos
1989	Part of the Soviet Union	
1991	Part of the Soviet Union	
1993	Did not enter	
1995	Did not enter	
1997	Group stage	57th
1999	Did not enter	
2001	Did not enter	
2003	Did not enter	
2005	Did not enter	
2007	Did not enter	
2009	Did not enter	
2011	Did not enter	
2013	Did not enter	
2015	Did not enter	
2017	Did not enter	
2019	Did not enter	
2021	Did not enter	
2023	Did not enter	
2025	TBD	
2027	TBD	
2029	TBD	

=== European Team Championships ===
==== Men's team ====
Year	Round	Pos
2004	Did not enter	
2006	Group stage	
2008	Did not enter	
2010	Did not enter	
2012	Did not enter	
2014	Did not enter	
2016	Did not enter	
2018	Did not enter	
2020	Did not enter	
2024	Did not enter	
2026	TBD	
2028	TBD	
2030	TBD	

==== Women's team ====
Year	Round	Pos
2004	Group stage	31st
2006	Did not enter	
2008	Did not enter	
2010	Did not enter	
2012	Did not enter	
2014	Did not enter	
2016	Did not enter	
2018	Did not enter	
2020	Did not enter	
2024	Did not enter	
2026	TBD	
2028	TBD	
2030	TBD	

==== Mixed team ====
Year	Round	Pos
1972	Part of the Soviet Union	
1974	Part of the Soviet Union	
1976	Part of the Soviet Union	
1978	Part of the Soviet Union	
1980	Part of the Soviet Union	
1982	Part of the Soviet Union	
1984	Part of the Soviet Union	
1986	Part of the Soviet Union	
1988	Part of the Soviet Union	
1990	Part of the Soviet Union	
1992	Part of the CIS	
1994	Did not enter	
1996	Did not enter	
1998	Did not enter	
2000	Did not enter	
2002	Did not enter	
2004	Did not enter	
2006	Did not enter	
2008	Did not enter	
2009	Did not enter	
2011	Did not enter	
2013	Did not enter	
2015	Did not enter	
2017	Did not enter	
2019	Did not enter	
2021	Did not enter	
2023	Did not enter	
2025	TBD	
2027	TBD	
2029	TBD	

**Red border color indicates tournament was held on home soil.

== Junior competitive record ==
=== Suhandinata Cup ===
Year	Round	Pos
2000	Did not enter	
2002	Did not enter	
2004	Did not enter	
2006	Did not enter	
2007	Did not enter	
2008	Did not enter	
2009	Did not enter	
2010	Did not enter	
2011	Did not enter	
2012	Did not enter	
2013	Group stage	26th
2014	Group stage	31st
2015	Did not enter	
2016	Group stage	48th
2017	Group stage	44th
2018	Did not enter	
2019	Group stage	40th
2022	Group stage	32nd
2023	Group stage	31st
2024	Group stage	34th
2025	Did not enter	
2026	Group stage	40th of 47

=== European Junior Team Championships ===
==== Mixed team ====
Year	Round	Pos
1975	Part of the Soviet Union	
1977	Part of the Soviet Union	
1979	Part of the Soviet Union	
1981	Part of the Soviet Union	
1983	Part of the Soviet Union	
1985	Part of the Soviet Union	
1987	Part of the Soviet Union	
1989	Part of the Soviet Union	
1991	Part of the Soviet Union	
1993	Did not enter	
1995	Did not enter	
1997	Did not enter	
1999	Did not qualify	
2001	Did not enter	
2003	Did not enter	
2005	Did not enter	
2007	Did not enter	
2009	Did not enter	
2011	Did not enter	
2013	Group stage	
2015	Group stage	
2017	Did not enter	
2018	Did not enter	
2020	Did not enter	
2022	Did not enter	
2024	TBD	

=== Finlandia Cup ===
==== Mixed team ====
Year	Round	Pos
1984	Part of the Soviet Union	
1986	Part of the Soviet Union	
1988	Part of the Soviet Union	
1990	Part of the Soviet Union	
1992	Part of the CIS	
1994	Did not enter	
1996	Did not enter	
1998	Group stage	21st
2000	Did not enter	
2002	Did not enter	
2004	Did not enter	
2006	Did not enter	

**Red border color indicates tournament was held on home soil.

== Staff ==
The following list shows the coaching staff for the national badminton team of Armenia.

Name	Role
(Armenia) Eleonora Mesropyani	Coach

== Players ==
=== Current squad ===
As of 2 January 2024

==== Men's team ====
Name	DoB/Age	Ranking of event		
Name	DoB/Age	MS	MD	XD
Arman Vardanyan	12 November 2003 (age 22)	–	–	–
Mikayel Harutyunyan	7 February 2005 (age 21)	–	–	–
Davit Saribekyan	5 June 2006 (age 20)	–	–	–
Gor Grigoryan	25 July 2002 (age 24)	–	–	–
Zaven Mnatsakanyan	3 October 1997 (age 29)	–	–	–
Manvel Harutyunyan	13 February 2006 (age 20)	–	–	–

==== Women's team ====
Name	DoB/Age	Ranking of event		
Name	DoB/Age	WS	WD	XD
Elen Tiraturyan	23 August 2005 (age 21)	–	–	–
Gayane Mamajanyan	13 March 2004 (age 22)	–	–	–
Lilit Poghosyan	17 April 1996 (age 30)	–	–	–
Marieta Nikoyan	24 December 1998 (age 27)	–	–	–
Svetlana Boyajyan	10 March 2004 (age 22)	–	–	–
Lusine Smbatyan	8 December 2007 (age 18)	–	–	–

== See also ==
- Sport in Armenia
