= 1963 Uber Cup knockout stage =

Badminton tournament

The knockout stage for the 1963 Uber Cup began on 1 April 1963 with the first round and ended on 6 April with the final tie.

== Qualified teams ==
The teams that won their zonal tie qualified for the final knockout stage.

Group	Winners
A	United States
B	Indonesia
C	Canada
D	England
E	New Zealand

== Bracket ==
First round
United States
Bye
1 April 1963 – New London
New Zealand	0
Indonesia	7
1 April 1963 – Boston
Canada	0
England	7

Second round
United States
Bye
3 April 1963 – Bronxville
Indonesia	2
England	5

Challenge round
6 April 1963 – Wilmington
United States	4
England	3

== First round ==
=== New Zealand vs Indonesia ===
New Zealand
0
New London, United States
1 April 1963

Indonesia
7

			1	2	3
1	(New Zealand) (Indonesia)	Val Gow; Corry Kawilarang	8; 11	1; 11
2	(New Zealand) (Indonesia)	Gilda Tompkins; Minarni	8; 11	4; 11
3	(New Zealand) (Indonesia)	Margaret Moorhead; Retno Koestijah	8; 11	5; 11
4	(New Zealand) (Indonesia)	Val Gow / Gaynor Simpson; Happy Herowati / Corry Kawilarang	7; 15	10; 15
5	(New Zealand) (Indonesia)	Margaret Moorhead / Gilda Tompkins; Retno Koestijah / Minarni	5; 15	4; 15
6	(New Zealand) (Indonesia)	Margaret Moorhead / Gilda Tompkins; Happy Herowati / Corry Kawilarang	5; 15	6; 15
7	(New Zealand) (Indonesia)	Val Gow / Gaynor Simpson; Retno Koestijah / Minarni	7; 15	4; 15

=== Canada vs England ===
Canada
0
Boston, United States
1 April 1963

England
7

			1	2	3
1	(Canada) (England)	Marjory Shedd; Angela Bairstow	6; 11	8; 11
2	(Canada) (England)	Jean Miller; Ursula Smith	5; 11	8; 11
3	(Canada) (England)	Patricia Espley; Iris Rogers	2; 11	1; 11
4	(Canada) (England)	Marjory Shedd / Dorothy Tinline; Brenda Parr / Jenny Pritchard	5; 15	8; 15
5	(Canada) (England)	Beverley Chittick / Jean Miller; Margaret Barrand / Ursula Smith	5; 15	13; 15
6	(Canada) (England)	Beverley Chittick / Jean Miller; Brenda Parr / Jenny Pritchard	7; 15	9; 15
7	(Canada) (England)	Marjory Shedd / Dorothy Tinline; Margaret Barrand / Ursula Smith	3; 15	7; 15

== Second round ==
=== England vs Indonesia ===
England
5
Bronxville, United States
3 April 1963

Indonesia
2

			1	2	3
1	(England) (Indonesia)	Angela Bairstow; Corry Kawilarang	11; 5	2; 11	12; 10
2	(England) (Indonesia)	Ursula Smith; Retno Koestijah	11; 8	11; 5
3	(England) (Indonesia)	Iris Rogers; Minarni	11; 9	11; 6
4	(England) (Indonesia)	Margaret Barrand / Ursula Smith; Happy Herowati / Corry Kawilarang	18; 13	17; 15
5	(England) (Indonesia)	Brenda Parr / Jenny Pritchard; Retno Koestijah / Minarni	15; 12	13; 15	2; 15
6	(England) (Indonesia)	Brenda Parr / Jenny Pritchard; Happy Herowati / Corry Kawilarang	5; 15	11; 15
7	(England) (Indonesia)	Margaret Barrand / Ursula Smith; Retno Koestijah / Minarni	15; 9	18; 15

== Challenge round ==
=== United States vs England ===
United States
4
Wilmington, United States
6 April 1963

England
3

			1	2	3
1	(United States) (England)	Judy Hashman; Angela Bairstow	11; 2	11; 1
2	(United States) (England)	McGregor Stewart; Ursula Smith	11; 4	11; 7
3	(United States) (England)	Dorothy O'Neil; Iris Rogers	6; 11	7; 11
4	(United States) (England)	Judy Hashman / Carlene Starkey; Margaret Barrand / Ursula Smith	15; 8	18; 15
5	(United States) (England)	Tyna Barinaga / Caroline Jensen; Jenny Pritchard / Iris Rogers	8; 15	1; 15
6	(United States) (England)	Judy Hashman / Carlene Starkey; Jenny Pritchard / Iris Rogers	15; 8	8; 15	15; 9
7	(United States) (England)	Tyna Barinaga / Caroline Jensen; Margaret Barrand / Ursula Smith	10; 15	14; 18
