= Poland national badminton team =

Polish national badminton team

Poland
- Association: Polski Związek Badmintona (PZBAD)
- Confederation: BE (Europe)
- President: Marek Krajewski

BWF ranking
- Current ranking: 39 ▼1 (2 January 2024)
- Highest ranking: 14 (5 January 2012)

Sudirman Cup
- Appearances: 12 (first in 1989)
- Best result: Group stage

Thomas Cup
- Appearances: 1 (first in 2010)
- Best result: Group stage

European Mixed Team Championships
- Appearances: 19 (first in 1980)
- Best result: Semi-finals (2008, 2009)

European Men's Team Championships
- Appearances: 7 (first in 2006)
- Best result: Runners-up (2010)

European Women's Team Championships
- Appearances: 6 (first in 2006)
- Best result: Group stage

Helvetia Cup
- Appearances: 9 (first in 1979)
- Best result: Champions (1989, 1991)

The Poland national badminton team (Polish: Reprezentacja Polski w badmintona) represents Poland in international badminton team competitions. It is managed by the Polish Badminton Association in the capital city of Warsaw. Poland competed in the Sudirman Cup from 1989 to 2011. The men's team only competed the Thomas Cup once in 2010 and the women's team have never qualified for the Uber Cup.

The men's team were runners-up at the 2010 European Men's Team Badminton Championships, where Poland was the host nation. The mixed team reached two consecutive semifinals in the European Mixed Team Badminton Championships in 2008 and 2009.

The Poland team has had many players in the past that have reached top 10 in the BWF World Ranking, one of them being Robert Mateusiak and Nadieżda Zięba, who were the world number one mixed doubles pair in 2010.

Poland has also been successful in para-badminton. National player Bartłomiej Mróz is a four-time silver medalist at the BWF Para-Badminton World Championships and has a career-high ranking of 3 in the men's singles SU5 category.

== Competitive record ==
=== Thomas Cup ===
Year	Result
(England) 1949	Did not enter
(Colony of Singapore) 1952	Did not enter
(Colony of Singapore) 1955	Did not enter
(Colony of Singapore) 1958	Did not enter
(Indonesia) 1961	Did not enter
(Japan) 1964	Did not enter
(Indonesia) 1967	Did not enter
(Malaysia) 1970	Did not enter
(Indonesia) 1973	Did not enter
(Thailand) 1976	Did not enter
(Indonesia) 1979	Did not enter
(England) 1982	Did not enter
(Malaysia) 1984	Did not enter
(Indonesia) 1986	Did not enter
(Malaysia) 1988	Did not enter
(Japan) 1990	Did not qualify
(Malaysia) 1992	Did not qualify
(Indonesia) 1994	Did not qualify
(Hong Kong) 1996	Did not qualify
(Hong Kong) 1998	Did not qualify
(Malaysia) 2000	Did not qualify
(China) 2002	Did not qualify
(Indonesia) 2004	Did not qualify
(Japan) 2006	Did not qualify
(Indonesia) 2008	Did not qualify
(Malaysia) 2010	Group stage
(China) 2012	Did not qualify
(India) 2014	Did not enter
(China) 2016	Did not qualify
(Thailand) 2018	Did not qualify
(Denmark) 2020	Did not qualify
(Thailand) 2022	Did not enter
(China) 2024	Did not qualify
(Denmark) 2026	Did not qualify
(N/A) 2028	TBD
(N/A) 2030	TBD

=== Uber Cup ===
Year	Result
(England) 1957	Did not enter
(United States) 1960	Did not enter
(United States) 1963	Did not enter
(New Zealand) 1966	Did not enter
(Japan) 1969	Did not enter
(Japan) 1972	Did not enter
(Indonesia) 1975	Did not enter
(New Zealand) 1978	Did not enter
(Japan) 1981	Did not enter
(Malaysia) 1984	Did not enter
(Indonesia) 1986	Did not qualify
(Malaysia) 1988	Did not enter
(Japan) 1990	Did not qualify
(Malaysia) 1992	Did not qualify
(Indonesia) 1994	Did not qualify
(Hong Kong) 1996	Did not qualify
(Hong Kong) 1998	Did not qualify
(Malaysia) 2000	Did not qualify
(China) 2002	Did not qualify
(Indonesia) 2004	Did not qualify
(Japan) 2006	Did not qualify
(Indonesia) 2008	Did not qualify
(Malaysia) 2010	Did not qualify
(China) 2012	Did not qualify
(India) 2014	Did not enter
(China) 2016	Did not enter
(Thailand) 2018	Did not qualify
(Denmark) 2020	Did not qualify
(Thailand) 2022	Did not enter
(China) 2024	Did not qualify
(Denmark) 2026	Did not qualify
(N/A) 2028	TBD
(N/A) 2030	TBD

=== Sudirman Cup ===
Year	Result
(Indonesia) 1989	Group 4 Relegated − 18th
(Denmark) 1991	Group 5 − 20th
(England) 1993	Group 5 Relegated − 22nd
(Switzerland) 1995	Group 6 Promoted − 23rd
(Scotland) 1997	Group 4 − 25th
(Denmark) 1999	Group 4 − 27th
(Spain) 2001	Group 4 − 27th
(Netherlands) 2003	Group 4 Promoted − 23rd
(China) 2005	Group 3 Promoted − 17th
(Scotland) 2007	Group 2 − 15th
(China) 2009	Group 2 − 19th
(China) 2011	Did not enter
(Malaysia) 2013	Did not enter
(China) 2015	Did not enter
(Australia) 2017	Did not enter
(China) 2019	Did not enter
(Finland) 2021	Did not enter
(China) 2023	Did not enter
(China) 2025	TBD
(N/A) 2027	TBD
(N/A) 2029	TBD

=== European Team Championships ===
==== Men's team ====
Year	Result
(Slovakia) 2004	Fourth place
(Greece) 2006	Quarter-finals
(Netherlands) 2008	Fourth place
(Poland) 2010	(silver) Runners-up
(Netherlands) 2012	Quarter-finals
(Switzerland) 2014	Did not enter
(Russia) 2016	Quarter-finals
(Russia) 2018	Quarter-finals
(France) 2020	Group stage
(Poland) 2024	Group stage
(Turkey) 2026	Did not qualify

==== Women's team ====
Year	Result
(Slovakia) 2004	Did not enter
(Greece) 2006	Group stage
(Netherlands) 2008	Group stage
(Poland) 2010	Group stage
(Netherlands) 2012	Group stage
(Switzerland) 2014	Did not enter
(Russia) 2016	Did not enter
(Russia) 2018	Group stage
(France) 2020	Group stage
(Poland) 2024	Group stage
(Turkey) 2026	Did not qualify

==== Mixed team ====
Year	Result
(Sweden) 1972	Did not enter
(Austria) 1974	Did not enter
(Republic of Ireland) 1976	Did not enter
(England) 1978	Did not enter
(Netherlands) 1980	Group stage − 17th
(West Germany) 1982	Group stage − 12th
(England) 1984	Group stage − 11th
(Sweden) 1986	Group stage − 9th
(Norway) 1988	Group stage − 8th
(Soviet Union) 1990	Group stage − 8th
(Scotland) 1992	Group stage − 8th
(Netherlands) 1994	Group stage − 8th
(Denmark) 1996	Group stage − 8th
(Bulgaria) 1998	Group stage − 14th
(Scotland) 2000	Group stage − 12th
(Sweden) 2002	Group stage − 9th
(Switzerland) 2004	Group stage − 5th
(Netherlands) 2006	Group stage − 5th
(Denmark) 2008	(bronze) Third place
(England) 2009	(bronze) Semi-finals
(Netherlands) 2011	Quarter-finals
(Russia) 2013	Did not enter
(Belgium) 2015	Group stage
(Poland) 2017	Quarter-finals
(Denmark) 2019	Did not qualify
(Finland) 2021	Did not qualify
(France) 2023	Did not qualify
(Azerbaijan) 2025	Did not qualify

=== Helvetia Cup ===
Year	Result
(Switzerland) 1962	Did not enter
(West Germany) 1963	Did not enter
(Netherlands) 1964	Did not enter
(Austria) 1965	Did not enter
(Belgium) 1966	Did not enter
(Switzerland) 1967	Did not enter
(Norway) 1968	Did not enter
(Czechoslovakia) 1969	Did not enter
(West Germany) 1970	Did not enter
(Netherlands) 1971	Did not enter
(Austria) 1973	Did not enter
(Belgium) 1975	Did not enter
(Soviet Union) 1977	Did not enter
(Austria) 1979	Group stage − 11th
(Norway) 1981	Fourth place
(Switzerland) 1983	Group stage − 9th
(Poland) 1985	(bronze) Third place
(Northern Ireland) 1987	Group stage − 5th
(Hungary) 1989	(gold) Champions
(Bulgaria) 1991	(gold) Champions
(Austria) 1993	(silver) Runners-up
(Cyprus) 1995	Did not enter
(France) 1997	Did not enter
(Northern Ireland) 1999	(silver) Runners-up
(Czech Republic) 2001	Did not enter
(Portugal) 2003	Did not enter
(Cyprus) 2005	Did not enter
(Iceland) 2007	Did not enter

=== FISU World University Games ===
==== Mixed team ====
Year	Result
(Thailand) 2007	Group stage
(China) 2011	Did not enter
(Russia) 2013	Quarter-finals
(South Korea) 2015	Group stage
(Chinese Taipei) 2017	Group stage
(China) 2021	Group stage
(Germany) 2025	TBD

=== World University Team Championships ===
==== Mixed team ====
Year	Result
(Portugal) 2008	(bronze) Semi-finals
(Chinese Taipei) 2010	Group stage
(South Korea) 2012	Group stage
(Spain) 2014	Did not enter
(Russia) 2016	Group stage
(Malaysia) 2018	Did not enter

**Red border color indicates tournament was held on home soil.

== Junior competitive record ==
=== Suhandinata Cup ===
Year	Round	Pos
(China) 2000	Did not enter	
(South Africa) 2002	Did not enter	
(Canada) 2004	Did not enter	
(South Korea) 2006	Did not enter	
(New Zealand) 2007	Did not enter	
(India) 2008	Did not enter	
(Malaysia) 2009	Did not enter	
(Mexico) 2010	Did not enter	
(Chinese Taipei) 2011	Did not enter	
(Japan) 2012	Did not enter	
(Thailand) 2013	Did not enter	
(Malaysia) 2014	Did not enter	
(Peru) 2015	Did not enter	
(Spain) 2016	Group stage	15th of 52
(Indonesia) 2017	Group stage	15th of 44
(Canada) 2018	Group stage	37th of 39
(Russia) 2019	Did not enter	
(New Zealand) 2020	Cancelled because of COVID-19 pandemic	
(China) 2021	Cancelled because of COVID-19 pandemic	
(Spain) 2022	Did not enter	
(United States) 2023	Did not enter	
(China) 2024	Group stage	12th of 39
(India) 2025	Group stage	16th of 36
(Egypt) 2026	Group stage	31st of 47

=== European Junior Team Championships ===
==== Mixed team ====
Year	Result
(Denmark) 1975	Did not enter
(Malta) 1977	Did not enter
(West Germany) 1979	Did not enter
(Scotland) 1981	Group stage − 15th
(Finland) 1983	Group stage − 12th
(Austria) 1985	Group stage − 13th
(Poland) 1987	Group stage − 12th
(England) 1989	Group stage − 9th
(Hungary) 1991	Group stage − 6th
(Bulgaria) 1993	Group stage − 7th
(Slovakia) 1995	Group stage − 7th
(Czech Republic) 1997	Group stage − 6th
(Scotland) 1999	Fourth place
(Poland) 2001	Group stage − 6th
(Denmark) 2003	Group stage − 8th
(Netherlands) 2005	Group stage − 13th
(Germany) 2007	Group stage − 8th
(Italy) 2009	Group stage
(Finland) 2011	Group stage
(Turkey) 2013	Group stage
(Poland) 2015	Group stage
(France) 2017	Group stage
(Estonia) 2018	Quarter-finals
(Finland) 2020	Did not enter
(Serbia) 2022	Group stage
(Spain) 2024	(bronze) Semi-finalist

=== Finlandia Cup ===
==== Mixed team ====
Year	Result
(Switzerland) 1984	(bronze) Third place
(Hungary) 1986	Fourth place
(Wales) 1988	(silver) Runners-up
(Austria) 1990	(silver) Runners-up
(Czechoslovakia) 1992	Did not enter
(Czech Republic) 1994	Did not enter
(Portugal) 1996	Did not enter
(Finland) 1998	Did not enter
(Austria) 2000	Did not enter
(Slovenia) 2002	Did not enter
(Austria) 2004	Did not enter
(Slovakia) 2006	Did not enter

**Red border color indicates tournament was held on home soil.

== Players ==
=== Current squad ===
As of 2 January 2024

==== Men's team ====
Name	DoB/Age	Ranking of event		
Name	DoB/Age	MS	MD	XD
Dominik Kwinta	27 July 2004 (age 22)	197	184	-
Mikołaj Szymanowski	27 November 2003 (age 22)	219	184	1021
Mateusz Danielak	9 August 1997 (age 29)	237	-	-
Maksymilian Danielak	29 October 2004 (age 22)	422	717	-
Szymon Slepecki	10 July 2003 (age 23)	-	143	214
Robert Cybulski	6 August 1999 (age 27)	-	143	133
Michal Sobolewski	26 January 1999 (age 27)	-	240	1315
Adam Szolc	18 March 1999 (age 27)	-	240	-
Jakub Melaniuk	28 September 2003 (age 23)	-	167	246
Paweł Śmiłowski	26 August 1998 (age 28)	-	320	103

==== Women's team ====
Name	DoB/Age	Ranking of event		
Name	DoB/Age	WS	WD	XD
Wiktoria Dąbczyńska	4 May 1999 (age 27)	133	318	-
Weronika Górniak	14 February 2002 (age 24)	301	-	-
Zuzanna Jankowska	18 August 2002 (age 24)	341	318	-
Jessica Orzechowicz	12 October 2002 (age 24)	383	871	711
Dominika Kwaśnik	5 October 2001 (age 25)	-	121	683
Kornelia Marczak	8 March 1997 (age 29)	-	121	133
Paulina Hankiewicz	30 May 2001 (age 25)	-	142	232
Magdalena Świerczyńska	4 April 1998 (age 28)	-	393	103
Anastasia Khomich	27 September 2002 (age 24)	961	182	214
Julia Pławecka	12 August 2003 (age 23)	-	402	246

=== Previous squads ===
==== Thomas Cup ====
- 2010

==== European Team Championships ====
- Men's team: 2020
- Women's team: 2020
