= BadmintonScotland =

Badminton association

Badminton Scotland
- Formation: 1911
- Type: National Sport Association
- Headquarters: Glasgow, Scotland
- President: Ian Campbell
- Affiliations: BEC, BWF
- Website: badmintonscotland.org.uk

Badminton Scotland is the governing body for the sport of badminton in Scotland. It aims to govern, encourage and develop the sport for all throughout the country. Established in 1911 as the Scottish Badminton Union, it is affiliated to the Badminton World Federation and the Badminton Europe.

== Presidents ==
Badminton Scotland organizes the annual Scottish Open, which has been held since 1907. Following table lists the presidents who have served in the organization since 1911.

No.	Name	Years
1	Thomas L. Adam	1911–1920
2	Dr. W. B. McTier, JP	1920–1922
3	C. J. Davidson	1922–1925
4	J. N. Morrison Sykes	1925–1928
5	Dr. J. Crombie	1928–1930
6	J. E. Inglis	1930–1932
7	J. A. Gibson	1932–1934
8	Jackson Millar	1934–1936
9	R. W. Stevenson	1936–38
10	E. D. Ballantyne	1938–1947
11	Hugh Harper	1948
12	T. Davidson	1949–1950
13	Dr. H. M. Crombie	1950–1952
14	N. D. Brodie	1952–1954
15	G. M. Crabbie	1954–1956
16	J. J. McCarry	1956–1958
17	E. W. Wilson	1958–1960
18	D. L. Bloomer	1960–1962
19	J. R. Cutt	1962–1964
20	H. H. Anderson	1964–1966

No.	Name	Years
21	John Stevenson	1966–1968
22	J. M. Simpson	1968–1970
23	A. P. Urquhart	1970–1972
24	D. C. Laidlaw	1972–1974
25	D. G. Nisbet	1974–1975
26	R. M. Fowlis	1975–1977
27	Craig Reedie	1977–1979
28	M. Henderson	1979–1981
29	C. R. Glegg	1981–1983
30	D. Gow	1983–1985
31	T. W. Pettigrew	1985–1987
32	C. M. Atkinson	1987–1989
33	I. E. Brown	1989–1991
34	D. B. Tennent	1991–1993
35	T. R. Campbell	1993–1995
36	J. Barrie	1995–1997
37	R. Conway	1997–1999
38	Dr. F. McEwan	1999–2001
39	Mrs. M. McCulloch	2001–2003
40	D. Barr	2003–2005

No.	Name	Years
41	J. S. Paterson	2005–2007
42	L. Douglas	2007–2009
43	Mrs. C. Black	2009–2011
44	Mrs. K. Stalker	2011–2013
45	R. Conway	2013–2015
46	Dan Travers	2015–2017
47	Ian Campbell	2017–present
