= 2024 European Men's and Women's Team Badminton Championships =

Tournament details
- Dates: 14 – 18 February
- Edition: 9
- Venue: Sport Arena
- Location: Łódź, Poland

Champions
- Men's teams: Denmark
- Women's teams: Denmark

The 2024 edition of the European Men's and Women's Team Badminton Championships was held in Łódź, Poland, from 14 to 18 February 2024. This tournament served as European qualification for the 2024 Thomas & Uber Cup. For the first time this competition was played with just the best 8 men's and women's team through the qualification stage held in 6 different nations. Poland as hosts and Denmark as reigning champions in both categories were automatically qualified.

== Medalists ==
| Event | Gold | Silver | Bronze |
|---|---|---|---|
| Men's Team | Denmark; Anders Antonsen; Kim Astrup; Viktor Axelsen; Mads Christophersen; Rasmus Gemke; Magnus Johannesen; Rasmus Kjær; Daniel Lundgaard; Anders Skaarup Rasmussen; Frederik Søgaard; Jesper Toft; Mads Vestergaard | France; Eloi Adam; Lucas Claerbout; Lucas Corvée; Thom Gicquel; Ronan Labar; Alex Lanier; Julien Maio; Arnaud Merklé; Christo Popov; Toma Junior Popov; Léo Rossi | England; Nadeem Dalvi; Rory Easton; Callum Hemming; Harry Huang; Cholan Kayan; Ben Lane; Toby Penty; Zach Russ; Ethan van Leeuwen; Sean Vendy |
| Men's Team | Denmark; Anders Antonsen; Kim Astrup; Viktor Axelsen; Mads Christophersen; Rasmus Gemke; Magnus Johannesen; Rasmus Kjær; Daniel Lundgaard; Anders Skaarup Rasmussen; Frederik Søgaard; Jesper Toft; Mads Vestergaard | France; Eloi Adam; Lucas Claerbout; Lucas Corvée; Thom Gicquel; Ronan Labar; Alex Lanier; Julien Maio; Arnaud Merklé; Christo Popov; Toma Junior Popov; Léo Rossi | Germany; Bjarne Geiss; Daniel Hess; Brian Holtschke; Samuel Hsiao; Matthias Kicklitz; Mark Lamsfuß; Kenneth Neumann; Kian-Yu Oei; Kai Schäfer; Patrick Scheiel; Marvin Seidel; Jan Colin Völker |
| Women's Team | Denmark; Natasja Anthonisen; Mia Blichfeldt; Alexandra Bøje; Christine Busch; Line Christophersen; Maiken Fruergaard; Clara Graversen; Julie Dawall Jakobsen; Line Kjærsfeldt; Amalie Magelund; Amalie Schulz; Sara Thygesen | Spain; Clara Azurmendi; Nikol Carulla; Beatriz Corrales; Nerea Ivorra; Carmen Maria Jiménez; Claudia Leal; Paula López; Carolina Marín; Lucía Rodríguez; Ania Setien | France; Sharone Bauer; Delphine Delrue; Malya Hoareau; Léonice Huet; Téa Margueritte; Rosy Oktavia Pancasari; Qi Xuefei; Anna Tatranova; Anne Tran; Flavie Vallet; Emilie Vercelot |
| Women's Team | Denmark; Natasja Anthonisen; Mia Blichfeldt; Alexandra Bøje; Christine Busch; Line Christophersen; Maiken Fruergaard; Clara Graversen; Julie Dawall Jakobsen; Line Kjærsfeldt; Amalie Magelund; Amalie Schulz; Sara Thygesen | Spain; Clara Azurmendi; Nikol Carulla; Beatriz Corrales; Nerea Ivorra; Carmen Maria Jiménez; Claudia Leal; Paula López; Carolina Marín; Lucía Rodríguez; Ania Setien | Scotland; Rachel Andrew; Katrina Chan; Kirsty Gilmour; Julie MacPherson; Ishbel McCallister; Lauren Middleton; Brooke Stalker; Rachel Sugden; Ciara Torrance |

=== Medal table ===
* Host nation (Poland)

| Rank | Nation | Gold | Silver | Bronze | Total |
|---|---|---|---|---|---|
| 1 | Denmark | 2 | 0 | 0 | 2 |
| 2 | France | 0 | 1 | 1 | 2 |
| 3 | Spain | 0 | 1 | 0 | 1 |
| 4 | England | 0 | 0 | 1 | 1 |
| 4 | Germany | 0 | 0 | 1 | 1 |
| 4 | Scotland | 0 | 0 | 1 | 1 |
| Totals (6 entries) | | 2 | 2 | 4 | 8 |

== Qualification ==
The draw was announced on 24 July 2023, played between 6 and 10 December 2023. 26 men's and 24 women's teams competed in group stage.

- Poland (Host nation)

=== Men's team ===
- Denmark (Reigning champion)

| Group | Host city | Qualifiers | Failed to qualify |
|---|---|---|---|
| 1 | (France) Aire-sur-la-Lys; Complexe Sportif Régional | France | Italy; Bulgaria; Slovenia |
| 2 | (Germany) Bad Camberg; Kreissporthalle | Germany | Finland; Estonia; Malta |
| 3 | (England) Milton Keynes; National Badminton Centre | England | Sweden; Switzerland; Iceland |
| 4 | (Netherlands) Arnhem; National Sports Centre Papendal | Netherlands | Spain; Hungary; Latvia |
| 5 | (England) Milton Keynes; National Badminton Centre | Ukraine | Scotland; Slovakia |
| 5 | (England) Milton Keynes; National Badminton Centre | Ukraine | Belgium^{§} Israel; Greenland |
| 6 | (Czech Republic) Prague; BB Arena Štěrboholy | Czech Republic | Austria; Portugal |
| 6 | (Czech Republic) Prague; BB Arena Štěrboholy | Czech Republic | Azerbaijan^{§} Ireland; Norway |

=== Women's team ===
- Denmark (Reigning champion)

| Group | Host city | Qualifiers | Failed to qualify |
|---|---|---|---|
| 1 | (Spain) Madrid; Residencia Joaquín Blume | Spain | Sweden; Italy; Luxembourg |
| 2 | (Germany) Bad Camberg; Kreissporthalle | Germany | England |
| 3 | (France) Aire-sur-la-Lys; Complexe Sportif Régional | France | Switzerland; Belgium; Slovenia |
| 4 | (Azerbaijan) Khirdalan; Absheron Olympic Sports Complex | Scotland | Estonia; Azerbaijan; Slovakia |
| 5 | (Bulgaria) Sofia; Badminton hall "Europe" | Turkey | Bulgaria^{§} Ireland; Latvia |
| 5 | (Bulgaria) Sofia; Badminton hall "Europe" | Turkey | Ukraine; Greenland |
| 6 | (Netherlands) Arnhem; National Sports Centre Papendal | Netherlands | Portugal; Finland |
| 6 | (Netherlands) Arnhem; National Sports Centre Papendal | Netherlands | Hungary^{§} Czech Republic; Israel |

- §: Subgroup winner.

== Tournament ==
The 2024 European Men's and Women's Team Badminton Championships will crown the best male and female national badminton teams in Europe and at the same time serve as the European qualification event towards the 2024 Thomas & Uber Cup to be held in Chengdu, China.

=== Venue ===
This tournament will be held at the Żyliński Sport Arena in Łódź, Poland.

=== Seeds ===
The defending Champions, Denmark, were top seeded for both men's and women's team, while the host country Poland were seeded seven and eight, respectively.

- Men's team
1. Denmark
2. France
3. Germany
4. England
5. Netherlands
6. Czech Republic
7. Poland
8. Ukraine
- Women's team
1. Denmark
2. Spain
3. Germany
4. France
5. Scotland
6. Netherlands
7. Turkey
8. Poland

=== Draw ===
The draw was held on 19 December 2023 at the Badminton Europe Confederation Office in Brøndby, Denmark at 12:00pm. Both the men's team and the women's team group stage consists of 2 groups, Group 1 and Group 2.

- Men's team

| Group A | Group B |
|---|---|
| Denmark; Germany; Czech Republic; Poland | France; Netherlands; England; Ukraine |

- Women's team

| Group A | Group B |
|---|---|
| Denmark; France; Turkey; Poland | Germany; Spain; Netherlands; Scotland |

== Men's team ==
All times are Central European Time (UTC+01:00).

=== Group stage ===
==== Group 1 ====
| Pos | Team | Pld | W | L | MF | MA | MD | GF | GA | GD | PF | PA | PD | Pts | Qualification | Denmark | Germany | Poland | Czech Republic |
|---|---|---|---|---|---|---|---|---|---|---|---|---|---|---|---|---|---|---|---|
| 1 | Denmark | 3 | 3 | 0 | 15 | 0 | +15 | 30 | 2 | +28 | 665 | 398 | +267 | 3 | Knockout stage | — | 5–0 | 5–0 | 5–0 |
| 2 | Germany | 3 | 2 | 1 | 8 | 7 | +1 | 18 | 14 | +4 | 579 | 524 | +55 | 2 | Knockout stage | | — | 4–1 | 4–1 |
| 3 | Poland (H) | 3 | 1 | 2 | 4 | 11 | −7 | 8 | 24 | −16 | 488 | 642 | −154 | 1 | | | | — | 3–2 |
| 4 | Czech Republic | 3 | 0 | 3 | 3 | 12 | −9 | 9 | 25 | −16 | 485 | 653 | −168 | 0 | | | | | — |

Source: TS
(H) Host

===== Denmark vs. Germany =====
Denmark
5
Sport Arena Łódź, Court 2
14 February 2024, 10:00

Germany
0

| | | | 1 | 2 | 3 |
|---|---|---|---|---|---|
| 1 | (Denmark) (Germany) | Anders Antonsen; Matthias Kicklitz | 16; 21 | 21; 16 | 21; 12 |
| 2 | (Denmark) (Germany) | Kim Astrup / Mads Vestergaard; Bjarne Geiss / Jan Colin Völker | 23; 21 | 21; 18 |
| 3 | (Denmark) (Germany) | Rasmus Gemke; Samuel Hsiao | 21; 14 | 21; 7 |
| 4 | (Denmark) (Germany) | Rasmus Kjær / Frederik Søgaard; Kenneth Neumann / Marvin Seidel | 21; 12 | 21; 14 |
| 5 | (Denmark) (Germany) | Magnus Johannesen; Kian-Yu Oei | 21; 12 | 21; 13 |

===== Poland vs. Czech Republic =====
Poland
3
Sport Arena Łódź, Court 1
14 February 2024, 10:00

Czech Republic
2

| | | | 1 | 2 | 3 |
|---|---|---|---|---|---|
| 1 | (Poland) (Czech Republic) | Dominik Kwinta; Jan Louda | 11; 21 | 12; 21 |
| 2 | (Poland) (Czech Republic) | Miłosz Bochat / Robert Cybulski; Ondřej Král / Adam Mendrek | 17; 21 | 10; 21 |
| 3 | (Poland) (Czech Republic) | Mikołaj Szymanowski; Jiří Král | 18; 21 | 21; 15 | 22; 20 |
| 4 | (Poland) (Czech Republic) | Szymon Slepecki / Paweł Śmiłowski; Vít Kulíšek / Tomáš Švejda | 21; 14 | 21; 16 |
| 5 | (Poland) (Czech Republic) | Adrian Dziółko; Dominik Kopřiva | 21; 19 | 15; 21 | 21; 19 |

===== Denmark vs. Czech Republic =====
Denmark
5
Sport Arena Łódź, Court 3
15 February 2024, 10:00

Czech Republic
0

| | | | 1 | 2 | 3 |
|---|---|---|---|---|---|
| 1 | (Denmark) (Czech Republic) | Anders Antonsen; Jan Louda | 21; 18 | 21; 9 |
| 2 | (Denmark) (Czech Republic) | Kim Astrup / Anders Skaarup Rasmussen; Ondřej Král / Adam Mendrek | 21; 11 | 21; 12 |
| 3 | (Denmark) (Czech Republic) | Magnus Johannesen; Dominik Kopřiva | 17; 21 | 21; 5 | 21; 10 |
| 4 | (Denmark) (Czech Republic) | Daniel Lundgaard / Mads Vestergaard; Vít Kulíšek / Tomáš Švejda | 21; 7 | 21; 6 |
| 5 | (Denmark) (Czech Republic) | Mads Christophersen; David Smutný | 21; 12 | 21; 8 |

===== Poland vs. Germany =====
Poland
1
Sport Arena Łódź, Court 1
15 February 2024, 10:00

Germany
4

| | | | 1 | 2 | 3 |
|---|---|---|---|---|---|
| 1 | (Poland) (Germany) | Dominik Kwinta; Matthias Kicklitz | 21; 23 | 19; 21 |
| 2 | (Poland) (Germany) | Jakub Melaniuk / Wiktor Trecki; Bjarne Geiss / Jan Colin Völker | 10; 21 | 12; 21 |
| 3 | (Poland) (Germany) | Mikołaj Szymanowski; Samuel Hsiao | 13; 21 | 19; 21 |
| 4 | (Poland) (Germany) | Robert Cybulski / Szymon Slepecki; Daniel Hess / Marvin Seidel | 10; 21 | 13; 21 |
| 5 | (Poland) (Germany) | Mateusz Golas; Kian-Yu Oei | 21; 14 | 21; 19 |

===== Denmark vs. Poland =====
Denmark
5
Sport Arena Łódź, Court 1
16 February 2024, 10:00

Poland
0

| | | | 1 | 2 | 3 |
|---|---|---|---|---|---|
| 1 | (Denmark) (Poland) | Rasmus Gemke; Dominik Kwinta | 21; 15 | 21; 15 |
| 2 | (Denmark) (Poland) | Rasmus Kjær / Frederik Søgaard; Jakub Melaniuk / Wiktor Trecki | 21; 8 | 21; 13 |
| 3 | (Denmark) (Poland) | Magnus Johannesen; Mikołaj Szymanowski | 21; 12 | 21; 9 |
| 4 | (Denmark) (Poland) | Daniel Lundgaard / Mads Vestergaard; Robert Cybulski / Szymon Slepecki | 21; 11 | 21; 9 |
| 5 | (Denmark) (Poland) | Mads Christophersen; Mateusz Golas | 21; 11 | 21; 16 |

===== Czech Republic vs. Germany =====
Czech Republic
1
Sport Arena Łódź, Court 3
16 February 2024, 10:00

Germany
4

| | | | 1 | 2 | 3 |
|---|---|---|---|---|---|
| 1 | (Czech Republic) (Germany) | Jan Louda; Kai Schäfer | 21; 12 | 9; 21 | 21; 15 |
| 2 | (Czech Republic) (Germany) | Jiří Král / Ondřej Král; Marvin Seidel / Jan Colin Völker | 13; 21 | 15; 21 |
| 3 | (Czech Republic) (Germany) | Dominik Kopřiva; Matthias Kicklitz | 14; 21 | 6; 21 |
| 4 | (Czech Republic) (Germany) | Vít Kulíšek / Tomáš Švejda; Bjarne Geiss / Kenneth Neumann | 13; 21 | 10; 21 |
| 5 | (Czech Republic) (Germany) | David Smutný; Samuel Hsiao | 10; 21 | 5; 21 |

==== Group 2 ====
| Pos | Team | Pld | W | L | MF | MA | MD | GF | GA | GD | PF | PA | PD | Pts | Qualification | France | England | Netherlands | Ukraine |
|---|---|---|---|---|---|---|---|---|---|---|---|---|---|---|---|---|---|---|---|
| 1 | France | 3 | 3 | 0 | 14 | 1 | +13 | 28 | 4 | +24 | 660 | 440 | +220 | 3 | Knockout stage | — | 4–1 | 5–0 | 5–0 |
| 2 | England | 3 | 2 | 1 | 8 | 7 | +1 | 17 | 15 | +2 | 563 | 538 | +25 | 2 | Knockout stage | | — | 3–2 | 4–1 |
| 3 | Netherlands | 3 | 1 | 2 | 7 | 8 | −1 | 16 | 18 | −2 | 584 | 620 | −36 | 1 | | | | — | 5–0 |
| 4 | Ukraine | 3 | 0 | 3 | 1 | 14 | −13 | 4 | 28 | −24 | 450 | 659 | −209 | 0 | | | | | — |

Source: TS

===== France vs. England =====
France
4
Sport Arena Łódź, Court 3
14 February 2024, 10:00

England
1

| | | | 1 | 2 | 3 |
|---|---|---|---|---|---|
| 1 | (France) (England) | Toma Junior Popov; Harry Huang | 21; 12 | 21; 11 |
| 2 | (France) (England) | Lucas Corvee / Ronan Labar; Ben Lane / Sean Vendy | 11; 21 | 19; 21 |
| 3 | (France) (England) | Christo Popov; Nadeem Dalvi | 21; 14 | 21; 14 |
| 4 | (France) (England) | Thom Gicquel / Toma Junior Popov; Callum Hemming / Ethan van Leeuwen | 21; 10 | 21; 16 |
| 5 | (France) (England) | Arnaud Merkle; Cholan Kayan | 21; 19 | 20; 22 | 21; 9 |

===== Ukraine vs. Netherlands =====
Ukraine
0
Sport Arena Łódź, Court 4
14 February 2024, 10:00

Netherlands
5

| | | | 1 | 2 | 3 |
|---|---|---|---|---|---|
| 1 | (Ukraine) (Netherlands) | Danylo Bosniuk; Mark Caljouw | 18; 21 | 9; 21 |
| 2 | (Ukraine) (Netherlands) | Viacheslav Yakovlev; Joran Kweekel | 16; 21 | 10; 21 |
| 3 | (Ukraine) (Netherlands) | Glib Beketov / Ivan Druzchenko; Andy Buijk / Timo Stoffelen | 15; 21 | 18; 21 |
| 4 | (Ukraine) (Netherlands) | Oleksii Titov; Noah Haase | 17; 21 | 22; 20 | 19; 21 |
| 5 | (Ukraine) (Netherlands) | Viacheslav Yakovlev / Nikita Yeromenko; Ties van der Lecq / Brian Wassink | 25; 23 | 12; 21 | 9; 21 |

===== France vs. Netherlands =====
France
5
Sport Arena Łódź, Court 2
15 February 2024, 10:00

Netherlands
0

| | | | 1 | 2 | 3 |
|---|---|---|---|---|---|
| 1 | (France) (Netherlands) | Toma Junior Popov; Mark Caljouw | 21; 19 | 21; 16 |
| 2 | (France) (Netherlands) | Christo Popov; Finn Achthoven | 21; 9 | 24; 22 |
| 3 | (France) (Netherlands) | Lucas Corvee / Ronan Labar; Ties van der Lecq / Brian Wassink | 21; 15 | 21; 16 |
| 4 | (France) (Netherlands) | Arnaud Merkle; Noah Haase | 21; 11 | 21; 9 |
| 5 | (France) (Netherlands) | Thom Gicquel / Christo Popov; Andy Buijk / Timo Stoffelen | 21; 7 | 19; 21 | 21; 6 |

===== Ukraine vs. England =====
Ukraine
1
Sport Arena Łódź, Court 4
15 February 2024, 10:00

England
4

| | | | 1 | 2 | 3 |
|---|---|---|---|---|---|
| 1 | (Ukraine) (England) | Danylo Bosniuk; Harry Huang | 21; 15 | 21; 13 |
| 2 | (Ukraine) (England) | Viacheslav Yakovlev; Cholan Kayan | 11; 21 | 8; 21 |
| 3 | (Ukraine) (England) | Glib Beketov / Nikita Yeromenko; Ben Lane / Sean Vendy | 10; 21 | 19; 21 |
| 4 | (Ukraine) (England) | Oleksii Titov; Toby Penty | 11; 21 | 13; 21 |
| 5 | (Ukraine) (England) | Danylo Bosniuk / Viacheslav Yakovlev; Zach Russ / Ethan van Leeuwen | 13; 21 | 13; 21 |

===== Netherlands vs. England =====
Netherlands
2
Sport Arena Łódź, Court 2
16 February 2024, 10:00

England
3

| | | | 1 | 2 | 3 |
|---|---|---|---|---|---|
| 1 | (Netherlands) (England) | Mark Caljouw; Harry Huang | 21; 16 | 21; 14 |
| 2 | (Netherlands) (England) | Noah Haase / Brian Wassink; Callum Hemming / Sean Vendy | 10; 21 | 10; 21 |
| 3 | (Netherlands) (England) | Joran Kweekel; Cholan Kayan | 21; 7 | 21; 14 |
| 4 | (Netherlands) (England) | Andy Buijk / Ties van der Lecq; Ben Lane / Ethan van Leeuwen | 15; 21 | 23; 21 | 10; 21 |
| 5 | (Netherlands) (England) | Finn Achthoven; Toby Penty | 14; 21 | 14; 21 |

===== France vs. Ukraine =====
France
5
Sport Arena Łódź, Court 4
16 February 2024, 10:00

Ukraine
0

| | | | 1 | 2 | 3 |
|---|---|---|---|---|---|
| 1 | (France) (Ukraine) | Toma Junior Popov; Danylo Bosniuk | 21; 17 | 21; 19 |
| 2 | (France) (Ukraine) | Christo Popov; Oleksii Titov | 21; 12 | 21; 15 |
| 3 | (France) (Ukraine) | Lucas Corvee / Thom Gicquel; Glib Beketov / Ivan Druzchenko | 21; 8 | 21; 11 |
| 4 | (France) (Ukraine) | Arnaud Merkle; Ivan Tsaregorotsev | 21; 15 | 21; 11 |
| 5 | (France) (Ukraine) | Christo Popov / Toma Junior Popov; Viacheslav Yakovlev / Nikita Yeromenko | 21; 8 | 21; 4 |

=== Knockout stage ===
Semi-finals
17 February 15:00
Denmark | 3
Germany | 0
17 February 15:00
England | 0
France | 3

Final
18 February 15:00
Denmark | 3
France | 0

==== Semi-finals ====
Denmark
3
Sport Arena Łódź, Court 1
17 February 2024, 15:00

Germany
0

| | | | 1 | 2 | 3 |
|---|---|---|---|---|---|---|
| 1 | (Denmark) (Germany) | Anders Antonsen; Matthias Kicklitz | 21; 11 | 21; 18 |
| 2 | (Denmark) (Germany) | Kim Astrup / Anders Skaarup Rasmussen; Bjarne Geiss / Jan Colin Völker | 24; 22 | 21; 17 |
| 3 | (Denmark) (Germany) | Rasmus Gemke; Samuel Hsiao | 21; 15 | 21; 13 |
| 4 | (Denmark) (Germany) | Rasmus Kjær / Frederik Søgaard; Daniel Hess / Marvin Seidel | | | | not played |
| 5 | (Denmark) (Germany) | Magnus Johannesen; Kian-Yu Oei | | | | not played |

England
0
Sport Arena Łódź, Court 2
17 February 2024, 15:00

France
3

| | | | 1 | 2 | 3 |
|---|---|---|---|---|---|---|
| 1 | (England) (France) | Harry Huang; Toma Junior Popov | 17; 21 | 13; 21 |
| 2 | (England) (France) | Callum Hemming / Sean Vendy; Lucas Corvée / Ronan Labar | 11; 21 | 16; 21 |
| 3 | (England) (France) | Nadeem Dalvi; Christo Popov | 12; 21 | 16; 21 |
| 4 | (England) (France) | Ben Lane / Ethan van Leeuwen; Thom Gicquel / Toma Junior Popov | | | | not played |
| 5 | (England) (France) | Cholan Kayan; Arnaud Merklé | | | | not played |

==== Final ====
Denmark
3
Sport Arena Łódź, Court 1
18 February 2024, 15:00

France
0

| | | | 1 | 2 | 3 |
|---|---|---|---|---|---|---|
| 1 | (Denmark) (France) | Anders Antonsen; Toma Junior Popov | 21; 15 | 21; 15 |
| 2 | (Denmark) (France) | Kim Astrup / Anders Skaarup Rasmussen; Lucas Corvee / Ronan Labar | 21; 13 | 21; 13 |
| 3 | (Denmark) (France) | Rasmus Gemke; Christo Popov | 14; 21 | 22; 20 | 21; 9 |
| 4 | (Denmark) (France) | Rasmus Kjær / Frederik Søgaard; Thom Gicquel / Toma Junior Popov | | | | not played |
| 5 | (Denmark) (France) | Mads Christophersen; Arnaud Merklé | | | | not played |

=== Final ranking ===
| Pos | Team | Pld | W | L | Pts | MD | GD | PD | Final result |
|---|---|---|---|---|---|---|---|---|---|
| 1st place, gold medalist(s) | Denmark | 5 | 5 | 0 | 10 | +21 | +39 | +335 | Champions |
| 2nd place, silver medalist(s) | France | 5 | 4 | 1 | 8 | +13 | +25 | +226 | Runners-up |
| 3rd place, bronze medalist(s) | Germany | 4 | 2 | 2 | 4 | −2 | −2 | +22 | Eliminated in semi-finals |
| 3rd place, bronze medalist(s) | England | 4 | 2 | 2 | 4 | −2 | −4 | −16 | Eliminated in semi-finals |
| 5 | Netherlands | 3 | 1 | 2 | 2 | −1 | −2 | −36 | Eliminated in group stage |
| 6 | Poland (H) | 3 | 1 | 2 | 2 | −7 | −16 | −154 | Eliminated in group stage |
| 7 | Czech Republic | 3 | 0 | 3 | 0 | −9 | −16 | −168 | Eliminated in group stage |
| 8 | Ukraine | 3 | 0 | 3 | 0 | −13 | −24 | −209 | Eliminated in group stage |

== Women's team ==
All times are Central European Time (UTC+01:00).

=== Group stage ===
==== Group 1 ====
| Pos | Team | Pld | W | L | MF | MA | MD | GF | GA | GD | PF | PA | PD | Pts | Qualification | Denmark | France | Turkey | Poland |
|---|---|---|---|---|---|---|---|---|---|---|---|---|---|---|---|---|---|---|---|
| 1 | Denmark | 3 | 3 | 0 | 14 | 1 | +13 | 29 | 4 | +25 | 687 | 496 | +191 | 3 | Knockout stage | — | 4–1 | 5–0 | 5–0 |
| 2 | France | 3 | 2 | 1 | 8 | 7 | +1 | 17 | 17 | 0 | 644 | 592 | +52 | 2 | Knockout stage | | — | 3–2 | 4–1 |
| 3 | Turkey | 3 | 1 | 2 | 6 | 9 | −3 | 13 | 19 | −6 | 516 | 585 | −69 | 1 | | | | — | 4–1 |
| 4 | Poland (H) | 3 | 0 | 3 | 2 | 13 | −11 | 7 | 26 | −19 | 470 | 644 | −174 | 0 | | | | | — |

Source: TS
(H) Host

===== Denmark vs. France =====
Denmark
4
Sport Arena Łódź, Court 2
14 February 2024, 15:00

France
1

| | | | 1 | 2 | 3 |
|---|---|---|---|---|---|
| 1 | (Denmark) (France) | Line Kjærsfeldt; Léonice Huet | 21; 13 | 21; 13 |
| 2 | (Denmark) (France) | Maiken Fruergaard / Sara Thygesen; Margot Lambert / Anne Tran | 18; 21 | 26; 24 | 22; 20 |
| 3 | (Denmark) (France) | Mia Blichfeldt; Rosy Oktavia Pancasari | 21; 17 | 21; 18 |
| 4 | (Denmark) (France) | Alexandra Bøje / Amalie Magelund; Sharone Bauer / Delphine Delrue | 21; 15 | 19; 21 | 17; 21 |
| 5 | (Denmark) (France) | Line Christophersen; Anna Tatranova | 21; 19 | 21; 12 |

===== Turkey vs. Poland =====
Turkey
4
Sport Arena Łódź, Court 1
14 February 2024, 15:00

Poland
1

| | | | 1 | 2 | 3 |
|---|---|---|---|---|---|---|
| 1 | (Turkey) (Poland) | Neslihan Arın; Wiktoria Dąbczyńska | 21; 13 | 21; 13 |
| 2 | (Turkey) (Poland) | Bengisu Erçetin / Nazlıcan İnci; Anastasia Khomich / Daria Zimnol | 21; 14 | 21; 9 |
| 3 | (Turkey) (Poland) | Özge Bayrak; Joanna Rudna | 21; 19 | 21; 10 |
| 4 | (Turkey) (Poland) | Yasemen Bektaş / Zehra Erdem; Paulina Hankiewicz / Kornelia Marczak | 21; 19 | 19; 21 | 21; 10 |
| 5 | (Turkey) (Poland) | Betül Söner; Zuzanna Jankowska | 4; 5 | | | retired |

===== Denmark vs. Poland =====
Denmark
5
Sport Arena Łódź, Court 1
15 February 2024, 15:00

Poland
0

| | | | 1 | 2 | 3 |
|---|---|---|---|---|---|
| 1 | (Denmark) (Poland) | Line Christophersen; Wiktoria Dabczynska | 21; 14 | 21; 11 |
| 2 | (Denmark) (Poland) | Christine Busch / Maiken Fruergaard; Anastasia Khomich / Daria Zimnol | 18; 21 | 21; 15 | 21; 15 |
| 3 | (Denmark) (Poland) | Julie Dawall Jakobsen; Zuzanna Jankowska | 21; 16 | 21; 10 |
| 4 | (Denmark) (Poland) | Alexandra Bøje / Amalie Magelund; Paulina Hankiewicz / Kornelia Marczak | 21; 13 | 21; 7 |
| 5 | (Denmark) (Poland) | Amalie Schulz; Ulyana Volskaya | 21; 11 | 21; 15 |

===== Turkey vs. France =====
Turkey
2
Sport Arena Łódź, Court 3
15 February 2024, 15:00

France
3

| | | | 1 | 2 | 3 |
|---|---|---|---|---|---|
| 1 | (Turkey) (France) | Neslihan Arın; Qi Xuefei | 21; 15 | 17; 21 | 6; 21 |
| 2 | (Turkey) (France) | Özge Bayrak; Léonice Huet | 21; 17 | 21; 15 |
| 3 | (Turkey) (France) | Zehra Erdem; Rosy Oktavia Pancasari | 14; 21 | 15; 21 |
| 4 | (Turkey) (France) | Bengisu Erçetin / Nazlıcan İnci; Margot Lambert / Anne Tran | 15; 21 | 19; 21 |
| 5 | (Turkey) (France) | Yasemen Bektaş / Zehra Erdem; Sharone Bauer / Delphine Delrue | 21; 17 | 21; 15 |

===== Denmark vs. Turkey =====
Denmark
5
Sport Arena Łódź, Court 4
16 February 2024, 15:00

Turkey
0

| | | | 1 | 2 | 3 |
|---|---|---|---|---|---|
| 1 | (Denmark) (Turkey) | Line Kjærsfeldt; Neslihan Arın | 21; 9 | 21; 8 |
| 2 | (Denmark) (Turkey) | Maiken Fruergaard / Sara Thygesen; Bengisu Erçetin / Nazlıcan İnci | 21; 18 | 21; 19 |
| 3 | (Denmark) (Turkey) | Mia Blichfeldt; Özge Bayrak | 21; 12 | 21; 16 |
| 4 | (Denmark) (Turkey) | Alexandra Bøje / Amalie Magelund; Yasemen Bektaş / Zehra Erdem | 21; 18 | 21; 14 |
| 5 | (Denmark) (Turkey) | Julie Dawall Jakobsen; Cansu Erçetin | 21; 11 | 21; 9 |

===== Poland vs. France =====
Poland
1
Sport Arena Łódź, Court 1
16 February 2024, 15:00

France
4

| | | | 1 | 2 | 3 |
|---|---|---|---|---|---|---|
| 1 | (Poland) (France) | Wiktoria Dąbczyńska; Léonice Huet | 17; 21 | 17; 21 |
| 2 | (Poland) (France) | Anastasia Khomich / Daria Zimnol; Margot Lambert / Anne Tran | 12; 21 | 10; 21 |
| 3 | (Poland) (France) | Zuzanna Jankowska; Rosy Oktavia Pancasari | 13; 21 | 8; 21 |
| 4 | (Poland) (France) | Paulina Hankiewicz / Kornelia Marczak; Sharone Bauer / Emilie Vercelot | 22; 20 | 21; 18 |
| 5 | (Poland) (France) | Jessica Orzechowicz; Anna Tatranova | 21; 19 | 5; 21 | 6; 14 | retired |

==== Group 2 ====
| Pos | Team | Pld | W | L | MF | MA | MD | GF | GA | GD | PF | PA | PD | Pts | Qualification | Spain | Scotland | Germany | Netherlands |
|---|---|---|---|---|---|---|---|---|---|---|---|---|---|---|---|---|---|---|---|
| 1 | Spain | 3 | 3 | 0 | 10 | 5 | +5 | 20 | 10 | +10 | 559 | 472 | +87 | 3 | Knockout stage | — | 3–2 | 3–2 | 4–1 |
| 2 | Scotland | 3 | 2 | 1 | 8 | 7 | +1 | 18 | 14 | +4 | 553 | 538 | +15 | 2 | Knockout stage | | — | 3–2 | 3–2 |
| 3 | Germany | 3 | 1 | 2 | 8 | 7 | +1 | 16 | 14 | +2 | 520 | 522 | −2 | 1 | | | | — | 4–1 |
| 4 | Netherlands | 3 | 0 | 3 | 4 | 11 | −7 | 8 | 24 | −16 | 495 | 595 | −100 | 0 | | | | | — |

Source: TS

===== Spain vs. Germany =====
Spain
3
Sport Arena Łódź, Court 3
14 February 2024, 15:00

Germany
2

| | | | 1 | 2 | 3 |
|---|---|---|---|---|---|
| 1 | (Spain) (Germany) | Carolina Marín; Yvonne Li | 21; 14 | 21; 16 |
| 2 | (Spain) (Germany) | Clara Azurmendi; Miranda Wilson | 21; 16 | 21; 9 |
| 3 | (Spain) (Germany) | Beatriz Corrales; Antonia Schaller | 21; 11 | 21; 16 |
| 4 | (Spain) (Germany) | Paula López / Lucía Rodríguez; Stine Küspert / Thuc Phuong Nguyen | 17; 21 | 17; 21 |
| 5 | (Spain) (Germany) | Clara Azurmendi / Beatriz Corrales; Linda Efler / Isabel Lohau | 10; 21 | 18; 21 |

===== Netherlands vs. Scotland =====
Netherlands
2
Sport Arena Łódź, Court 4
14 February 2024, 15:00

Scotland
3

| | | | 1 | 2 | 3 |
|---|---|---|---|---|---|---|
| 1 | (Netherlands) (Scotland) | Jaymie Laurens; Kirsty Gilmour | 10; 21 | 7; 21 |
| 2 | (Netherlands) (Scotland) | Debora Jille / Alyssa Tirtosentono; Julie MacPherson / Ciara Torrance | 21; 14 | 18; 21 | 21; 14 |
| 3 | (Netherlands) (Scotland) | Nadia Choukri; Rachel Sudgen | 15; 21 | 16; 21 |
| 4 | (Netherlands) (Scotland) | Kirsten de Wit / Kelly van Buiten; Rachel Andrew / Kirsty Gilmour | 10; 21 | 22; 24 |
| 5 | (Netherlands) (Scotland) | Flora Wang; Lauren Middleton | 11; 21 | 21; 15 | 6; 1 | retired |

===== Spain vs. Scotland =====
Spain
3
Sport Arena Łódź, Court 4
15 February 2024, 15:00

Scotland
2

| | | | 1 | 2 | 3 |
|---|---|---|---|---|---|
| 1 | (Spain) (Scotland) | Carolina Marín; Kirsty Gilmour | 16; 21 | 11; 21 |
| 2 | (Spain) (Scotland) | Clara Azurmendi; Rachel Sudgen | 21; 14 | 21; 16 |
| 3 | (Spain) (Scotland) | Beatriz Corrales; Brooke Stalker | 21; 13 | 21; 6 |
| 4 | (Spain) (Scotland) | Paula López / Lucía Rodríguez; Rachel Andrew / Kirsty Gilmour | 21; 12 | 21; 14 |
| 5 | (Spain) (Scotland) | Clara Azurmendi / Beatriz Corrales; Julie MacPherson / Ciara Torrance | 13; 21 | 14; 21 |

===== Netherlands vs. Germany =====
Netherlands
1
Sport Arena Łódź, Court 2
15 February 2024, 15:00

Germany
4

| | | | 1 | 2 | 3 |
|---|---|---|---|---|---|
| 1 | (Netherlands) (Germany) | Jaymie Laurens; Yvonne Li | 14; 21 | 9; 21 |
| 2 | (Netherlands) (Germany) | Kirsten de Wit / Debora Jille; Linda Efler / Isabel Lohau | 18; 21 | 16; 21 |
| 3 | (Netherlands) (Germany) | Nadia Choukri; Miranda Wilson | 15; 21 | 13; 21 |
| 4 | (Netherlands) (Germany) | Cheryl Seinen / Kelly van Buiten; Stine Küspert / Thuc Phuong Nguyen | 13; 21 | 15; 21 |
| 5 | (Netherlands) (Germany) | Flora Wang; Antonia Schaller | 21; 14 | 21; 7 |

===== Spain vs. Netherlands =====
Spain
4
Sport Arena Łódź, Court 2
16 February 2024, 15:00

Netherlands
1

| | | | 1 | 2 | 3 |
|---|---|---|---|---|---|
| 1 | (Spain) (Netherlands) | Carolina Marín; Jaymie Laurens | 21; 15 | 21; 13 |
| 2 | (Spain) (Netherlands) | Clara Azurmendi; Nadia Choukri | 21; 10 | 21; 9 |
| 3 | (Spain) (Netherlands) | Ania Setien; Flora Wang | 21; 15 | 21; 13 |
| 4 | (Spain) (Netherlands) | Paula López / Lucía Rodríguez; Debora Jille / Cheryl Seinen | 21; 14 | 21; 16 |
| 5 | (Spain) (Netherlands) | Nikol Carulla / Ania Setien; Kirsten de Wit / Kelly van Buiten | 9; 21 | 14; 21 |

===== Scotland vs. Germany =====
Scotland
3
Sport Arena Łódź, Court 3
16 February 2024, 15:00

Germany
2

| | | | 1 | 2 | 3 |
|---|---|---|---|---|---|
| 1 | (Scotland) (Germany) | Kirsty Gilmour; Yvonne Li | 21; 11 | 21; 13 |
| 2 | (Scotland) (Germany) | Rachel Sudgen; Miranda Wilson | 17; 21 | 12; 21 |
| 3 | (Scotland) (Germany) | Julie MacPherson; Antonia Schaller | 21; 12 | 21; 11 |
| 4 | (Scotland) (Germany) | Rachel Andrew / Kirsty Gilmour; Stine Küspert / Thuc Phuong Nguyen | 21; 19 | 21; 15 |
| 5 | (Scotland) (Germany) | Julie MacPherson / Ciara Torrance; Linda Efler / Isabel Lohau | 14; 21 | 10; 21 |

=== Knockout stage ===
Semi-finals
17 February 10:00
Denmark | 3
France | 1
17 February 10:00
Scotland | 0
Spain | 3

Final
18 February 10:00
Denmark | 3
Spain | 1

==== Semi-finals ====
Denmark
3
Sport Arena Łódź, Court 1
17 February 2024, 10:00

France
1

| | | | 1 | 2 | 3 |
|---|---|---|---|---|---|---|
| 1 | (Denmark) (France) | Line Kjærsfeldt; Qi Xuefei | 14; 21 | 21; 16 | 21; 17 |
| 2 | (Denmark) (France) | Maiken Fruergaard / Sara Thygesen; Margot Lambert / Anne Tran | 21; 16 | 15; 21 | 17; 21 |
| 3 | (Denmark) (France) | Mia Blichfeldt; Léonice Huet | 21; 15 | 21; 16 |
| 4 | (Denmark) (France) | Alexandra Bøje / Amalie Magelund; Sharone Bauer / Delphine Delrue | 21; 23 | 21; 17 | 21; 8 |
| 5 | (Denmark) (France) | Line Christophersen; Rosy Oktavia Pancasari | | | | not played |

Scotland
0
Sport Arena Łódź, Court 2
17 February 2024, 10:00

Spain
3

| | | | 1 | 2 | 3 |
|---|---|---|---|---|---|---|
| 1 | (Scotland) (Spain) | Kirsty Gilmour; Carolina Marín | 15; 21 | 11; 21 |
| 2 | (Scotland) (Spain) | Rachel Sudgen; Clara Azurmendi | 14; 21 | 18; 21 |
| 3 | (Scotland) (Spain) | Julie MacPherson; Beatriz Corrales | 7; 21 | 7; 21 |
| 4 | (Scotland) (Spain) | Rachel Andrew / Kirsty Gilmour; Paula López / Lucía Rodríguez | | | | not played |
| 5 | (Scotland) (Spain) | Julie MacPherson / Ciara Torrance; Clara Azurmendi / Beatriz Corrales | | | | not played |

==== Final ====
Denmark
3
Sport Arena Łódź, Court 1
18 February 2024, 10:00

Spain
1

| | | | 1 | 2 | 3 |
|---|---|---|---|---|---|---|
| 1 | (Denmark) (Spain) | Line Kjærsfeldt; Carolina Marín | 19; 21 | 12; 21 |
| 2 | (Denmark) (Spain) | Mia Blichfeldt; Clara Azurmendi | 21; 12 | 21; 19 |
| 3 | (Denmark) (Spain) | Line Christophersen; Beatriz Corrales | 21; 9 | 21; 16 |
| 4 | (Denmark) (Spain) | Christine Busch / Amalie Magelund; Paula López / Lucía Rodríguez | 21; 13 | 21; 13 |
| 5 | (Denmark) (Spain) | Maiken Fruergaard / Sara Thygesen; Clara Azurmendi / Beatriz Corrales | | | | not played |

=== Final ranking ===
| Pos | Team | Pld | W | L | Pts | MD | GD | PD | Final result |
|---|---|---|---|---|---|---|---|---|---|
| 1st place, gold medalist(s) | Denmark | 5 | 5 | 0 | 10 | +17 | +32 | +247 | Champions |
| 2nd place, silver medalist(s) | Spain | 5 | 4 | 1 | 8 | +6 | +12 | +108 | Runners-up |
| 3rd place, bronze medalist(s) | France | 4 | 2 | 2 | 4 | −1 | −3 | +29 | Eliminated in semi-finals |
| 3rd place, bronze medalist(s) | Scotland | 4 | 2 | 2 | 4 | −2 | −2 | −39 | Eliminated in semi-finals |
| 5 | Germany | 3 | 1 | 2 | 2 | +1 | +2 | −2 | Eliminated in group stage |
| 6 | Turkey | 3 | 1 | 2 | 2 | −3 | −6 | −69 | Eliminated in group stage |
| 7 | Netherlands | 3 | 0 | 3 | 0 | −7 | −16 | −100 | Eliminated in group stage |
| 8 | Poland | 3 | 0 | 3 | 0 | −11 | −19 | −174 | Eliminated in group stage |
