= 2004 European Thomas & Uber Cup Preliminaries =

European badminton tournament

Tournament details
- Dates: 10–15 February 2004
- Venue: Mestská Hala
- Location: Prešov, Slovakia

The 2004 European Thomas & Uber Cup Preliminaries were the European qualifiers for the 2004 Thomas & Uber Cup in Jakarta, Indonesia. The tournament was held at the Mestská Hala (now City Hall Prešov) in Prešov, Slovakia. A total of 65 teams, including 34 men's teams and 31 women's teams took part in the qualifiers.

Denmark won the men's and women's competition, with Germany second in both cases. Denmark and Germany both qualified for the 2004 Thomas Cup as finalists of the European preliminaries. England qualified for the 2004 Thomas Cup as the team placed third after defeating Poland 3–1 in the third place match.

== Men's team ==
=== Group stage ===
==== Group A ====
Pos	Team	Pld	W	L	MF	MA	MD	Pts	Qualification	Denmark	Portugal	Slovenia	Switzerland
1	Denmark	3	3	0	15	0	+15	3	Knockout stage	—	5–0	5–0	5–0
2	Portugal	3	2	1	8	7	+1	2			—	4–1	4–1
3	Slovenia	3	1	2	6	9	−3	1				—	5–0
4	Switzerland	3	0	3	1	14	−13	0					—

Source: tuc.presov.sk

==== Group B ====
Pos	Team	Pld	W	L	MF	MA	MD	Pts	Qualification	Germany	Scotland	Greece	Latvia
1	Germany	3	3	0	15	0	+15	3	Knockout stage	—	5–0	5–0	5–0
2	Scotland	3	2	1	9	6	+3	2			—	4–1	5–0
3	Greece	3	1	2	5	10	−5	1				—	4–1
4	Latvia	3	0	3	1	14	−13	0					—

Source: tuc.presov.sk

==== Group C ====
Pos	Team	Pld	W	L	MF	MA	MD	Pts	Qualification	England	Bulgaria	Czech Republic	Moldova
1	England	3	3	0	14	1	+13	3	Knockout stage	—	5–0	4–1	5–0
2	Bulgaria	3	2	1	8	7	+1	2			—	3–2	5–0
3	Czech Republic	3	1	2	8	7	+1	1				—	5–0
4	Moldova	3	0	3	0	15	−15	0					—

Source: tuc.presov.sk

==== Group D ====
Pos	Team	Pld	W	L	MF	MA	MD	Pts	Qualification	Ukraine	Spain	Estonia	Israel
1	Ukraine	3	3	0	13	2	+11	3	Knockout stage	—	3–2	5–0	5–0
2	Spain	3	2	1	12	3	+9	2			—	5–0	5–0
3	Estonia	3	1	2	5	10	−5	1				—	5–0
4	Israel	3	0	3	0	15	−15	0					—

Source: tuc.presov.sk

==== Group E ====
Pos	Team	Pld	W	L	MF	MA	MD	Pts	Qualification	France	Finland	Ireland	Belarus
1	France	3	3	0	12	3	+9	3	Knockout stage	—	3–2	5–0	4–1
2	Finland	3	2	1	11	4	+7	2			—	4–1	5–0
3	Ireland	3	1	2	4	11	−7	1				—	3–2
4	Belarus	3	0	3	3	12	−9	0					—

Source: tuc.presov.sk

==== Group F ====
Pos	Team	Pld	W	L	MF	MA	MD	Pts	Qualification	Sweden	Norway	Lithuania
1	Sweden	2	2	0	9	1	+8	2	Knockout stage	—	4–1	5–0
2	Norway	2	1	1	6	4	+2	1			—	5–0
3	Lithuania	2	0	2	0	10	−10	0				—

Source: tuc.presov.sk

==== Group G ====
Pos	Team	Pld	W	L	MF	MA	MD	Pts	Qualification	Poland	Iceland	Cyprus	Slovakia
1	Poland	3	3	0	15	0	+15	3	Knockout stage	—	5–0	5–0	5–0
2	Iceland	3	2	1	10	5	+5	2			—	5–0	5–0
3	Cyprus	3	1	2	3	12	−9	1				—	3–2
4	Slovakia (H)	3	0	3	2	13	−11	0					—

Source: tuc.presov.sk
(H) Host

==== Group H ====
Pos	Team	Pld	W	L	MF	MA	MD	Pts	Qualification	Russia	Belgium	Hungary	Turkey
1	Russia	3	3	0	15	0	+15	3	Knockout stage	—	5–0	5–0	5–0
2	Belgium	3	2	1	9	6	+3	2			—	4–1	5–0
3	Hungary	3	1	2	6	9	−3	1				—	4–1
4	Turkey	3	0	3	1	14	−13	0					—

Source: tuc.presov.sk

==== Group K ====
Pos	Team	Pld	W	L	MF	MA	MD	Pts	Qualification	Netherlands	Wales	Austria
1	Netherlands	2	2	0	9	1	+8	2	Knockout stage	—	4–1	5–0
2	Wales	2	1	1	4	6	−2	1			—	3–2
3	Austria	2	0	2	2	8	−6	0				—

Source: tuc.presov.sk

=== Knockout stage ===
Second round
K1	Netherlands	3
F1	Sweden	1

Quarter-finals
A1	Denmark	3
K1	Netherlands	0
G1	Poland	3
D1	Ukraine	1
C1	England	3
H1	Russia	1
B1	Germany	3
E1	France	0

Semi-finals
A1	Denmark	3
G1	Poland	0
C1	England	2
B1	Germany	3

Final
A1	Denmark	3
B1	Germany	0
Third place
G1	Poland	1
C1	England	3

=== Final ranking ===
Pos	Team	Pld	W	L	Pts	MD	GD	PD	Final result
1st place, gold medalist(s)	Denmark	6	6	0	6	+24	−	−	Champions
2nd place, silver medalist(s)	Germany	6	5	1	5	+19	−	−	Runners-up
3rd place, bronze medalist(s)	England	6	5	1	5	+17	−	−	Third place
4	Poland	6	4	2	4	+12	−	−	Fourth place
5	Russia	4	3	1	3	+9	−	−	Eliminated in quarter-finals
6	Ukraine	4	3	1	3	+9	−	−	Eliminated in quarter-finals
7	Netherlands	4	3	1	3	+7	−	−	Eliminated in quarter-finals
8	France	4	3	1	3	+6	−	−	Eliminated in quarter-finals
9	Sweden	3	2	1	2	+6	−	−	Eliminated in second round
10	Spain	3	2	1	2	+9	−	−	Eliminated in group stage
11	Belgium	3	2	1	2	+9	−	−	Eliminated in group stage
12	Finland	3	2	1	2	+7	−	−	Eliminated in group stage
13	Scotland	3	2	1	2	+3	−	−	Eliminated in group stage
14	Bulgaria	3	2	1	2	+1	−	−	Eliminated in group stage
15	Portugal	3	2	1	2	+1	−	−	Eliminated in group stage
16	Iceland	3	2	1	2	+1	−	−	Eliminated in group stage
17	Czech Republic	3	2	1	2	+1	−	−	Eliminated in group stage
18	Slovenia	3	2	1	2	−3	−	−	Eliminated in group stage
19	Estonia	3	2	1	2	−5	−	−	Eliminated in group stage
20	Norway	2	1	1	1	+2	−	−	Eliminated in group stage
21	Wales	2	1	1	1	−2	−	−	Eliminated in group stage
22	Slovakia (H)	3	1	2	1	−5	−	−	Eliminated in group stage
23	Hungary	3	1	2	1	−5	−	−	Eliminated in group stage
24	Greece	3	1	2	1	−5	−	−	Eliminated in group stage
25	Ireland	3	1	2	1	−7	−	−	Eliminated in group stage
26	Austria	2	0	2	0	−6	−	−	Eliminated in group stage
27	Belarus	3	0	3	0	−9	−	−	Eliminated in group stage
28	Cyprus	3	0	3	0	−11	−	−	Eliminated in group stage
29	Lithuania	2	0	2	0	−10	−	−	Eliminated in group stage
30	Switzerland	3	0	3	0	−13	−	−	Eliminated in group stage
31	Latvia	3	0	3	0	−13	−	−	Eliminated in group stage
32	Turkey	3	0	3	0	−15	−	−	Eliminated in group stage
33	Israel	3	0	3	0	−15	−	−	Eliminated in group stage
34	Moldova	3	0	3	0	−15	−	−	Eliminated in group stage

=== Qualified teams ===
- Denmark (23rd appearance)
- Germany (2nd appearance)
- England (9th appearance)

== Women's team ==
=== Group stage ===
==== Group A ====
Pos	Team	Pld	W	L	MF	MA	MD	Pts	Qualification	Netherlands	Scotland	Latvia	Ireland
1	Netherlands	3	3	0	15	0	+15	3	Knockout stage	—	5–0	5–0	5–0
2	Scotland	3	2	1	9	6	+3	2			—	4–1	5–0
3	Latvia	3	1	2	4	11	−7	1				—	3–2
4	Ireland	3	0	3	2	13	−11	0					—

Source: tuc.presov.sk

==== Group B ====
Pos	Team	Pld	W	L	MF	MA	MD	Pts	Qualification	Denmark	Austria	Hungary
1	Denmark	2	2	0	10	0	+10	2	Knockout stage	—	5–0	5–0
2	Austria	2	1	1	3	7	−4	1			—	3–2
3	Hungary	2	0	2	2	8	−6	0				—

Source: tuc.presov.sk

==== Group C ====
Pos	Team	Pld	W	L	MF	MA	MD	Pts	Qualification	Germany	Iceland	Norway	Greece
1	Germany	3	3	0	15	0	+15	3	Knockout stage	—	5–0	5–0	5–0
2	Iceland	3	2	1	10	5	+5	2			—	5–0	5–0
3	Norway	3	1	2	4	11	−7	1				—	4–1
4	Greece	3	0	3	1	14	−13	0					—

Source: tuc.presov.sk

==== Group D ====
Pos	Team	Pld	W	L	MF	MA	MD	Pts	Qualification	England	Slovenia	Portugal	Slovakia
1	England	3	3	0	14	1	+13	3	Knockout stage	—	4–1	5–0	5–0
2	Slovenia	3	2	1	10	5	+5	2			—	5–0	4–1
3	Portugal	3	1	2	3	12	−9	1				—	3–2
4	Slovakia (H)	3	0	3	3	12	−9	0					—

Source: tuc.presov.sk
(H) Host

==== Group E ====
Pos	Team	Pld	W	L	MF	MA	MD	Pts	Qualification	France	Switzerland	Spain	Lithuania
1	France	3	3	0	12	3	+9	3	Knockout stage	—	3–2	4–1	5–0
2	Switzerland	3	2	1	11	4	+7	2			—	4–1	5–0
3	Spain	3	1	2	7	8	−1	1				—	5–0
4	Lithuania	3	0	3	0	15	−15	0					—

Source: tuc.presov.sk

==== Group F ====
Pos	Team	Pld	W	L	MF	MA	MD	Pts	Qualification	Sweden	Ukraine	Estonia	Romania
1	Sweden	3	3	0	12	3	+9	3	Knockout stage	—	3–2	4–1	5–0
2	Ukraine	3	2	1	11	4	+7	2			—	4–1	5–0
3	Estonia	3	1	2	5	10	−5	1				—	3–2
4	Romania	3	0	3	2	13	−11	0					—

Source: tuc.presov.sk

==== Group G ====
Pos	Team	Pld	W	L	MF	MA	MD	Pts	Qualification	Russia	Wales	Turkey	Armenia
1	Russia	3	3	0	14	1	+13	3	Knockout stage	—	4–1	5–0	5–0
2	Wales	3	2	1	11	4	+7	2			—	5–0	5–0
3	Turkey	3	1	2	4	11	−7	1				—	4–1
4	Armenia	3	0	3	1	14	−13	0					—

Source: tuc.presov.sk

==== Group H ====
Pos	Team	Pld	W	L	MF	MA	MD	Pts	Qualification	Bulgaria	Finland	Czech Republic	Cyprus
1	Bulgaria	3	3	0	14	1	+13	3	Knockout stage	—	4–1	5–0	5–0
2	Finland	3	2	1	10	5	+5	2			—	4–1	5–0
3	Czech Republic	3	1	2	6	9	−3	1				—	5–0
4	Cyprus	3	0	3	0	15	−15	0					—

Source: tuc.presov.sk

=== Knockout stage ===
Quarter-finals
B1	Denmark	3
H1	Bulgaria	0
D1	England	3
F1	Sweden	0
A1	Netherlands	3
G1	Russia	0
C1	Germany	3
E1	France	0

Semi-finals
B1	Denmark	3
D1	England	0
A1	Netherlands	1
C1	Germany	3

Final
B1	Denmark	3
C1	Germany	2
Third place
D1	England	0
A1	Netherlands	3

=== Final ranking ===
Pos	Team	Pld	W	L	Pts	MD	GD	PD	Final result
1st place, gold medalist(s)	Denmark	5	5	0	5	+17	−	−	Champions
2nd place, silver medalist(s)	Germany	6	5	1	5	+19	−	−	Runners-up
3rd place, bronze medalist(s)	Netherlands	6	5	1	5	+19	−	−	Third place
4	England	6	4	2	4	+10	−	−	Fourth place
5	Russia	4	3	1	3	+10	−	−	Eliminated in quarter-finals
6	Bulgaria	4	3	1	3	+10	−	−	Eliminated in quarter-finals
7	Sweden	4	3	1	3	+6	−	−	Eliminated in quarter-finals
8	France	4	3	1	3	+6	−	−	Eliminated in quarter-finals
9	Switzerland	3	2	1	2	+7	−	−	Eliminated in group stage
10	Wales	3	2	1	2	+7	−	−	Eliminated in group stage
11	Ukraine	3	2	1	2	+7	−	−	Eliminated in group stage
12	Slovenia	3	2	1	2	+5	−	−	Eliminated in group stage
13	Finland	3	2	1	2	+5	−	−	Eliminated in group stage
14	Iceland	3	2	1	2	+5	−	−	Eliminated in group stage
15	Scotland	3	2	1	2	+3	−	−	Eliminated in group stage
16	Spain	3	2	1	2	−1	−	−	Eliminated in group stage
17	Czech Republic	3	2	1	2	−3	−	−	Eliminated in group stage
18	Austria	2	1	1	1	−4	−	−	Eliminated in group stage
19	Estonia	3	1	2	1	−5	−	−	Eliminated in group stage
20	Turkey	3	1	2	1	−7	−	−	Eliminated in group stage
21	Norway	3	1	2	1	−7	−	−	Eliminated in group stage
22	Latvia	3	1	2	1	−7	−	−	Eliminated in group stage
23	Portugal	3	1	2	1	−9	−	−	Eliminated in group stage
24	Hungary	2	0	2	0	−6	−	−	Eliminated in group stage
25	Slovakia (H)	3	0	3	0	−9	−	−	Eliminated in group stage
26	Ireland	3	0	3	0	−11	−	−	Eliminated in group stage
27	Cyprus	3	0	3	0	−11	−	−	Eliminated in group stage
28	Romania	3	0	3	0	−11	−	−	Eliminated in group stage
29	Greece	3	0	3	0	−13	−	−	Eliminated in group stage
30	Lithuania	3	0	3	0	−15	−	−	Eliminated in group stage
31	Armenia	3	0	3	0	−15	−	−	Eliminated in group stage

=== Qualified teams ===
- Denmark (14th appearance)
- Germany (2nd appearance)
- Netherlands (6th appearance)
