= Portugal national badminton team =

National badminton team

Portugal
- Association: Federação Portuguesa de Badminton (FPB)
- Confederation: BE (Europe)
- President: Horácio Miranda Ornelas Bento de Gouveia

BWF ranking
- Current ranking: 67 ▼11 (3 October 2023)
- Highest ranking: 44 (6 October 2011)

Sudirman Cup
- Appearances: 7 (first in 1995)
- Best result: Group stage

European Mixed Team Championships
- Appearances: 10 (first in 1978)
- Best result: Group stage

European Men's Team Championships
- Appearances: 7 (first in 2004)
- Best result: Group stage

European Women's Team Championships
- Appearances: 7 (first in 2004)
- Best result: Group stage

Helvetia Cup
- Appearances: 9 (first in 1979)
- Best result: Runners-up (1997, 2001)

The Portugal national badminton team (Portuguese: Seleção Portuguesa de Badminton) represents Portugal in international badminton team competitions. It is controlled by the Portuguese Badminton Federation, the governing body for badminton in Portugal. The Portuguese have never competed in the Thomas Cup and Uber Cup. The team last participated the Sudirman Cup in 2009.

The team have been competing in the European Men's and Women's Team Badminton Championships since 2006. They have never reached the quarterfinals.

== Competitive record ==
=== Thomas Cup ===
Year	Result
(England) 1949	Did not enter
(Colony of Singapore) 1952	Did not enter
(Colony of Singapore) 1955	Did not enter
(Colony of Singapore) 1958	Did not enter
(Indonesia) 1961	Did not enter
(Japan) 1964	Did not enter
(Indonesia) 1967	Did not enter
(Malaysia) 1970	Did not enter
(Indonesia) 1973	Did not enter
(Thailand) 1976	Did not enter
(Indonesia) 1979	Did not enter
(England) 1982	Did not enter
(Malaysia) 1984	Did not enter
(Indonesia) 1986	Did not enter
(Malaysia) 1988	Did not enter
(Japan) 1990	Did not enter
(Malaysia) 1992	Did not qualify
(Indonesia) 1994	Did not qualify
(Hong Kong) 1996	Did not qualify
(Hong Kong) 1998	Did not qualify
(Malaysia) 2000	Did not qualify
(China) 2002	Did not qualify
(Indonesia) 2004	Did not qualify
(Japan) 2006	Did not qualify
(Indonesia) 2008	Did not qualify
(Malaysia) 2010	Did not qualify
(China) 2012	Did not qualify
(India) 2014	Did not enter
(China) 2016	Did not enter
(Thailand) 2018	Did not qualify
(Denmark) 2020	Did not qualify
(Thailand) 2022	Did not enter
(China) 2024	Did not qualify
(Denmark) 2026	Did not qualify
(N/A) 2028	TBD
(N/A) 2030	TBD

=== Uber Cup ===
Year	Result
(England) 1957	Did not enter
(United States) 1960	Did not enter
(United States) 1963	Did not enter
(New Zealand) 1966	Did not enter
(Japan) 1969	Did not enter
(Japan) 1972	Did not enter
(Indonesia) 1975	Did not enter
(New Zealand) 1978	Did not enter
(Japan) 1981	Did not enter
(Malaysia) 1984	Did not enter
(Indonesia) 1986	Did not enter
(Malaysia) 1988	Did not enter
(Japan) 1990	Did not enter
(Malaysia) 1992	Did not enter
(Indonesia) 1994	Did not qualify
(Hong Kong) 1996	Did not qualify
(Hong Kong) 1998	Did not qualify
(Malaysia) 2000	Did not qualify
(China) 2002	Did not qualify
(Indonesia) 2004	Did not qualify
(Japan) 2006	Did not qualify
(Indonesia) 2008	Did not qualify
(Malaysia) 2010	Did not qualify
(China) 2012	Did not qualify
(India) 2014	Did not enter
(China) 2016	Did not enter
(Thailand) 2018	Did not qualify
(Denmark) 2020	Did not qualify
(Thailand) 2022	Did not enter
(China) 2024	Did not qualify
(Denmark) 2026	Did not qualify
(N/A) 2028	TBD
(N/A) 2030	TBD

=== Sudirman Cup ===
Year	Result
(Indonesia) 1989	Did not enter
(Denmark) 1991	Did not enter
(England) 1993	Did not enter
(Switzerland) 1995	Group 9 − 38th
(Scotland) 1997	Group 5 − 35th
(Denmark) 1999	Group 5 − 35th
(Spain) 2001	Group 5 − 36th
(Netherlands) 2003	Group 5 − 31st
(China) 2005	Did not enter
(Scotland) 2007	Group 6 Promoted − 41st
(China) 2009	Group 4 − 28th
(China) 2011	Did not enter
(Malaysia) 2013	Did not enter
(China) 2015	Did not enter
(Australia) 2017	Did not enter
(China) 2019	Did not enter
(Finland) 2021	Did not enter
(China) 2023	Did not enter
(China) 2025	TBD
(N/A) 2027	TBD
(N/A) 2029	TBD

=== European Team Championships ===
==== Men's team ====
Year	Result
(Slovakia) 2004	Group stage
(Greece) 2006	Group stage
(Netherlands) 2008	Group stage
(Poland) 2010	Group stage
(Netherlands) 2012	Group stage
(Switzerland) 2014	Did not enter
(Russia) 2016	Did not enter
(Russia) 2018	Group stage
(France) 2020	Group stage
(Poland) 2024	Did not qualify
(Turkey) 2026	Did not qualify

==== Women's team ====
Year	Result
(Slovakia) 2004	Group stage
(Greece) 2006	Group stage
(Netherlands) 2008	Group stage
(Poland) 2010	Group stage
(Netherlands) 2012	Group stage
(Switzerland) 2014	Did not enter
(Russia) 2016	Did not enter
(Russia) 2018	Group stage
(France) 2020	Group stage
(Poland) 2024	Did not qualify
(Turkey) 2026	Did not qualify

==== Mixed team ====
Year	Result
(Sweden) 1972	Did not enter
(Austria) 1974	Did not enter
(Republic of Ireland) 1976	Did not enter
(England) 1978	Group stage − 18th
(Netherlands) 1980	Group stage − 20th
(West Germany) 1982	Did not enter
(England) 1984	Did not enter
(Sweden) 1986	Did not enter
(Norway) 1988	Group stage − 21st
(Soviet Union) 1990	Did not enter
(Scotland) 1992	Group stage − 22nd
(Netherlands) 1994	Did not enter
(Denmark) 1996	Did not enter
(Bulgaria) 1998	Group stage − 15th
(Scotland) 2000	Group stage − 16th
(Sweden) 2002	Group stage − 15th
(Switzerland) 2004	Did not enter
(Netherlands) 2006	Group stage − 14th
(Denmark) 2008	Did not enter
(England) 2009	Group stage
(Netherlands) 2011	Group stage
(Russia) 2013	Did not enter
(Belgium) 2015	Did not enter
(Poland) 2017	Did not qualify
(Denmark) 2019	Did not qualify
(Finland) 2021	Did not qualify
(France) 2023	Did not qualify
(Azerbaijan) 2025	Did not qualify

=== Helvetia Cup ===
Year	Result
(Switzerland) 1962	Did not enter
(West Germany) 1963	Did not enter
(Netherlands) 1964	Did not enter
(Austria) 1965	Did not enter
(Belgium) 1966	Did not enter
(Switzerland) 1967	Did not enter
(Norway) 1968	Did not enter
(Czechoslovakia) 1969	Did not enter
(West Germany) 1970	Did not enter
(Netherlands) 1971	Did not enter
(Austria) 1973	Did not enter
(Belgium) 1975	Did not enter
(Soviet Union) 1977	Did not enter
(Austria) 1979	Group stage − 10th
(Norway) 1981	Did not enter
(Switzerland) 1983	Did not enter
(Poland) 1985	Did not enter
(Northern Ireland) 1987	Did not enter
(Hungary) 1989	Did not enter
(Bulgaria) 1991	Did not enter
(Austria) 1993	Group stage − 13th
(Cyprus) 1995	Group stage − 9th
(France) 1997	(silver) Runners-up
(Northern Ireland) 1999	(bronze) Third place
(Czech Republic) 2001	(silver) Runners-up
(Portugal) 2003	Fourth place
(Cyprus) 2005	(bronze) Third place
(Iceland) 2007	Group stage − 5th

=== FISU World University Games ===
==== Mixed team ====
Year	Result
(Thailand) 2007	Did not enter
(China) 2011	Did not enter
(Russia) 2013	Did not enter
(South Korea) 2015	Did not enter
(Chinese Taipei) 2017	Did not enter
(China) 2021	Did not enter
(Germany) 2025	TBD

=== World University Team Championships ===
==== Mixed team ====
Year	Result
(Portugal) 2008	Round of 16
(Chinese Taipei) 2010	Did not enter
(South Korea) 2012	Did not enter
(Spain) 2014	Did not enter
(Russia) 2016	Did not enter
(Malaysia) 2018	Did not enter

**Red border color indicates tournament was held on home soil.

== Junior competitive record ==
=== Suhandinata Cup ===
Year	Round	Pos
(China) 2000	Did not enter	
(South Africa) 2002	Did not enter	
(Canada) 2004	Did not enter	
(South Korea) 2006	Did not enter	
(New Zealand) 2007	Did not enter	
(India) 2008	Did not enter	
(Malaysia) 2009	Did not enter	
(Mexico) 2010	Did not enter	
(Chinese Taipei) 2011	Did not enter	
(Japan) 2012	Did not enter	
(Thailand) 2013	Did not enter	
(Malaysia) 2014	Did not enter	
(Peru) 2015	Did not enter	
(Spain) 2016	Group H2	28th of 52
(Indonesia) 2017	Did not enter	
(Canada) 2018	Did not enter	
(Russia) 2019	Group D	34th of 43
(New Zealand) 2020	Cancelled because of COVID-19 pandemic	
(China) 2021	Cancelled because of COVID-19 pandemic	
(Spain) 2022	Group C	29th of 37
(United States) 2023	Group E	18th of 40
(China) 2024	Group H	33rd of 39
(India) 2025	Group A	27th of 36
(Egypt) 2026	Group stage	34th of 47

=== European Junior Team Championships ===
==== Mixed team ====
Year	Result
(Denmark) 1975	Did not enter
(Malta) 1977	Did not enter
(West Germany) 1979	Group stage − 17th
(Scotland) 1981	Group stage − 16th
(Finland) 1983	Did not enter
(Austria) 1985	Group stage − 20th
(Poland) 1987	Did not enter
(England) 1989	Group stage − 19th
(Hungary) 1991	Group stage − 14th
(Bulgaria) 1993	Group stage − 16th
(Slovakia) 1995	Did not enter
(Czech Republic) 1997	Did not enter
(Scotland) 1999	Did not enter
(Poland) 2001	Did not enter
(Denmark) 2003	Did not enter
(Netherlands) 2005	Group stage − 12th
(Germany) 2007	Group stage − 16th
(Italy) 2009	Did not enter
(Finland) 2011	Did not enter
(Turkey) 2013	Did not enter
(Poland) 2015	Group stage
(France) 2017	Group stage
(Estonia) 2018	Group stage
(Finland) 2020	Group stage
(Serbia) 2022	Group stage
(Spain) 2024	Group stage

=== Finlandia Cup ===
==== Mixed team ====
Year	Result
(Switzerland) 1984	Did not enter
(Hungary) 1986	Did not enter
(Wales) 1988	Group stage − 12th
(Austria) 1990	Group stage − 10th
(Czechoslovakia) 1992	Group stage − 13th
(Czech Republic) 1994	Group stage − 9th
(Portugal) 1996	Group stage − 14th
(Finland) 1998	Group stage − 7th
(Austria) 2000	Fourth place
(Slovenia) 2002	Group stage − 5th
(Austria) 2004	(bronze) Third place
(Slovakia) 2006	Did not enter

**Red border color indicates tournament was held on home soil.

== Players ==
=== Current squad ===
==== Men's team ====
Name	DoB/Age	Ranking of event		
Name	DoB/Age	MS	MD	XD
Bernardo Atilano	19 June 1996 (age 30)	100	-	-
David Silva	12 September 2003 (age 23)	1107	490	900
Gabriel Rodrigues	15 April 2002 (age 24)	276	488	572
Duarte Nuno Anjo	5 April 1996 (age 30)	1352	1296	-
Angelo Silva	30 March 1997 (age 29)	1624	1268	1277
Tomas Nero	1 December 1992 (age 33)	-	866	966
Bruno Carvalho	1 October 1994 (age 32)	277	622	648
Rodrigo Almeida	29 August 2001 (age 25)	1605	490	882
Pedro Portelas	31 January 2003 (age 23)	1286	941	966
Rodrigo Dias	31 October 2003 (age 22)	-	941	1277

==== Women's team ====
Name	DoB/Age	Ranking of event		
Name	DoB/Age	WS	WD	XD
Madalena Fortunato	14 May 2004 (age 22)	271	507	900
Mariana Afonso	18 January 2002 (age 24)	1028	741	1085
Inês Pardilhó	9 October 2004 (age 22)	771	679	1277
Mariana Paiva	7 October 1998 (age 28)	281	507	656
Mariana Pinto Leite	3 July 1999 (age 27)	971	524	1107
Mariana Neves	19 March 2002 (age 24)	-	698	882
Catarina Martins	5 July 1999 (age 27)	1167	741	865
Sonia Gonçalves	24 September 1994 (age 32)	517	295	648
Adriana Gonçalves	24 April 1999 (age 27)	754	295	900
Beatriz Roberto	9 April 2004 (age 22)	1163	880	966

=== Previous squads ===
==== European Team Championships ====
- Men's team: 2020
- Women's team: 2020
