= Scotland national badminton team =

National badminton team representing Scotland

Scotland
- Association: Badminton Scotland (BS)
- Confederation: BE (Europe)
- President: Carolyn Young

BWF ranking
- Current ranking: 21 (2 January 2024)
- Highest ranking: 15 (4 January 2018)

Sudirman Cup
- Appearances: 13 (first in 1989)
- Best result: Group stage

Uber Cup
- Appearances: 1 (first in 2020)
- Best result: Group stage

European Mixed Team Championships
- Appearances: 27 (first in 1972)
- Best result: Fourth place (1984, 1986)

European Men's Team Championships
- Appearances: 7 (first in 2004)
- Best result: Group stage

European Women's Team Championships
- Appearances: 7 (first in 2004)
- Best result: Semi-finals (2020)

The Scotland national badminton team represents Scotland in international badminton team competitions. It is controlled by Badminton Scotland, the organization for badminton in the nation. The Scottish team have never participated in the Thomas Cup but have participated in the Uber Cup and the Sudirman Cup multiple times. The team reached the semifinals at the 2020 European Men's and Women's Team Badminton Championships.

== Competitive record ==
=== Thomas Cup ===
Year	Round	Pos
1949	Did not qualify	
1952	Did not qualify	
1955	Did not qualify	
1958	Did not qualify	
1961	Did not qualify	
1964	Did not qualify	
1967	Did not qualify	
1970	Did not qualify	
1973	Did not qualify	
1976	Did not qualify	
1979	Did not qualify	
1982	Did not qualify	
1984	Did not qualify	
1986	Did not qualify	
1988	Did not qualify	
1990	Did not qualify	
1992	Did not qualify	
1994	Did not qualify	
1996	Did not qualify	
1998	Did not qualify	
2000	Did not qualify	
2002	Did not qualify	
2004	Did not qualify	
2006	Did not qualify	
2008	Did not qualify	
2010	Did not qualify	
2012	Did not qualify	
2014	Did not qualify	
2016	Did not qualify	
2018	Did not enter	
2020	Did not enter	
2022	Did not enter	
2024	Did not qualify	
2026	Did not enter	
2028	TBD	
2030	TBD	

=== Uber Cup ===
Year	Round	Pos
1957	Did not qualify	
1960	Did not qualify	
1963	Did not qualify	
1966	Did not qualify	
1969	Did not qualify	
1972	Did not qualify	
1975	Did not qualify	
1978	Did not qualify	
1981	Did not qualify	
1984	Did not qualify	
1986	Did not qualify	
1988	Did not qualify	
1990	Did not qualify	
1992	Did not qualify	
1994	Did not qualify	
1996	Did not qualify	
1998	Did not qualify	
2000	Did not qualify	
2002	Did not qualify	
2004	Did not qualify	
2006	Did not qualify	
2008	Did not qualify	
2010	Did not qualify	
2012	Did not qualify	
2014	Did not qualify	
2016	Did not enter	
2018	Did not enter	
2020	Group stage	13th
2022	Did not enter	
2024	Qualified but withdrew	
2026	Did not enter	
2028	TBD	
2030	TBD	

=== Sudirman Cup ===
Year	Round	Pos
1989	Group stage	15th
1991	Group stage	13th
1993	Group stage	13th
1995	Group stage	14th
1997	Group stage	15th
1999	Group stage	12th
2001	Group stage	14th
2003	Group stage	14th
2005	Group stage	21st
2007	Group stage	19th
2009	Group stage	21st
2011	Did not enter	
2013	Group stage	14th
2015	Did not enter	
2017	Group stage	17th
2019	Did not enter	
2021	Did not qualify	
2023	Did not qualify	
2025	TBD	
2027	TBD	
2029	TBD	

=== Commonwealth Games ===
==== Men's team ====
Year	Round	Pos
1998	Quarter-finals	

==== Women's team ====
Year	Round	Pos
1998	Quarter-finals	

==== Mixed team ====
Year	Round	Pos
1978	Group stage	
1982	Group stage	
1986	Fourth place	4th
1990	Group stage	
1994	Group stage	
2002	Semi-finals	4th
2006	Did not enter	
2010	Quarter-finals	
2014	Quarter-finals	
2018	Quarter-finals	
2022	Quarter-finals	
2026	TBD	

=== European Team Championships ===
==== Men's team ====
Year	Round	Pos
2004	Group stage	
2006	Group stage	
2008	Group stage	
2010	Group stage	
2012	Group stage	
2014	Group stage	
2016	Group stage	
2018	Did not enter	
2020	Did not enter	
2024	Did not qualify	
2026	TBD	
2028	TBD	
2030	TBD	

==== Women's team ====
Year	Round	Pos
2004	Group stage	
2006	Group stage	
2008	Group stage	
2010	Group stage	
2012	Group stage	
2014	Group stage	
2016	Did not enter	
2018	Did not enter	
2020	Semi-finals	4th
2024	Semi-finals	4th
2026	TBD	
2028	TBD	
2030	TBD	

==== Mixed team ====
Year	Round	Pos
1972	Group stage	5th
1974	Group stage	6th
1976	Group stage	6th
1978	Group stage	6th
1980	Group stage	7th
1982	Group stage	6th
1984	Fourth place	4th
1986	Fourth place	4th
1988	Group stage	7th
1990	Group stage	6th
1992	Group stage	5th
1994	Group stage	7th
1996	Group stage	7th
1998	Group stage	8th
2000	Group stage	13th
2002	Group stage	13th
2004	Group stage	10th
2006	Group stage	9th
2008	Group stage	9th
2009	Group stage	
2011	Group stage	
2013	Quarter-finals	
2015	Quarter-finals	
2017	Did not qualify	
2019	Did not qualify	
2021	Group stage	5th
2023	Group stage	5th
2025	TBD	
2027	TBD	
2029	TBD	

**Red border color indicates tournament was held on home soil.

== Junior competitive record ==
=== Suhandinata Cup ===
Year	Round	Pos
2000	Did not enter	
2002	Did not enter	
2004	Did not enter	
2006	Did not enter	
2007	Group stage	10th
2008	Group stage	17th
2009	Did not enter	
2010	Did not enter	
2011	Did not enter	
2012	Did not enter	
2013	Group stage	16th
2014	Did not enter	
2015	Did not enter	
2016	Group stage	34th
2017	Group stage	23rd
2018	Group stage	12th
2019	Group stage	20th
2022	Did not enter	
2023	Did not enter	
2024	TBD	

=== Commonwealth Youth Games ===
==== Mixed team ====
Year	Round	Pos
2004	Group stage	5th

=== European Junior Team Championships ===
==== Mixed team ====
Year	Round	Pos
1975	Group stage	5th
1977	Group stage	5th
1979	Group stage	6th
1981	Group stage	6th
1983	Group stage	5th
1985	Group stage	5th
1987	Group stage	5th
1989	Group stage	6th
1991	Group stage	8th
1993	Group stage	11th
1995	Group stage	15th
1997	Group stage	13th
1999	Group stage	9th
2001	Group stage	8th
2003	Group stage	10th
2005	Group stage	9th
2007	Group stage	6th
2009	Group stage	
2011	Group stage	
2013	Group stage	
2015	Group stage	
2017	Group stage	
2018	Quarter-finals	
2020	Did not enter	
2022	Group stage	
2024	Group stage	

=== Finlandia Cup ===
==== Mixed team ====
Year	Round	Pos
1984	Did not enter	
1986	Did not enter	
1988	Did not enter	
1990	Did not enter	
1992	Did not enter	
1994	Did not enter	
1996	Champions	1st
1998	Did not enter	
2000	Did not enter	
2002	Did not enter	
2004	Did not enter	
2006	Did not enter	

**Red border color indicates tournament was held on home soil.

== Players ==
=== Current squad ===
As of 2 January 2024

==== Men's team ====
Name	DoB/Age	Ranking of event		
Name	DoB/Age	MS	MD	XD
Callum Smith	9 March 2002 (age 24)	681	-	-
James Robertson	2 January 2000 (age 26)	767	-	-
Danny Robson	24 June 2001 (age 24)	1735	-	-
Alexander Dunn	13 September 1998 (age 27)	-	31	370
Adam Hall	12 February 1996 (age 30)	-	31	43
Christopher Grimley	6 February 2000 (age 26)	-	51	197
Matthew Grimley	6 February 2000 (age 26)	-	51	551
Jack MacGregor	1 March 2000 (age 26)	-	115	614
Adam Pringle	31 March 2001 (age 25)	-	115	106
Ciar Pringle	31 January 1999 (age 27)	-	671	1021

==== Women's team ====
Name	DoB/Age	Ranking of event		
Name	DoB/Age	WS	WD	XD
Kirsty Gilmour	21 September 1993 (age 32)	25	-	-
Rachel Sugden	13 November 2001 (age 24)	180	578	-
Lauren Middleton	23 July 2000 (age 25)	260	589	-
Abbie Brooks	20 May 2004 (age 21)	655	-	-
Julie MacPherson	17 November 1997 (age 28)	-	45	43
Ciara Torrance	1 September 1999 (age 26)	-	45	370
Rachel Andrew	19 January 2001 (age 25)	-	179	106
Sarah Sidebottom	26 April 2000 (age 26)	-	589	614
Eleanor O'Donnell	1 September 1998 (age 27)	-	179	197
Jodie Harris	10 April 2002 (age 24)	-	-	-

=== Previous squads ===
==== Uber Cup ====
- 2020
