= Garfield Sobers Gymnasium =

Sports venue in Barbados

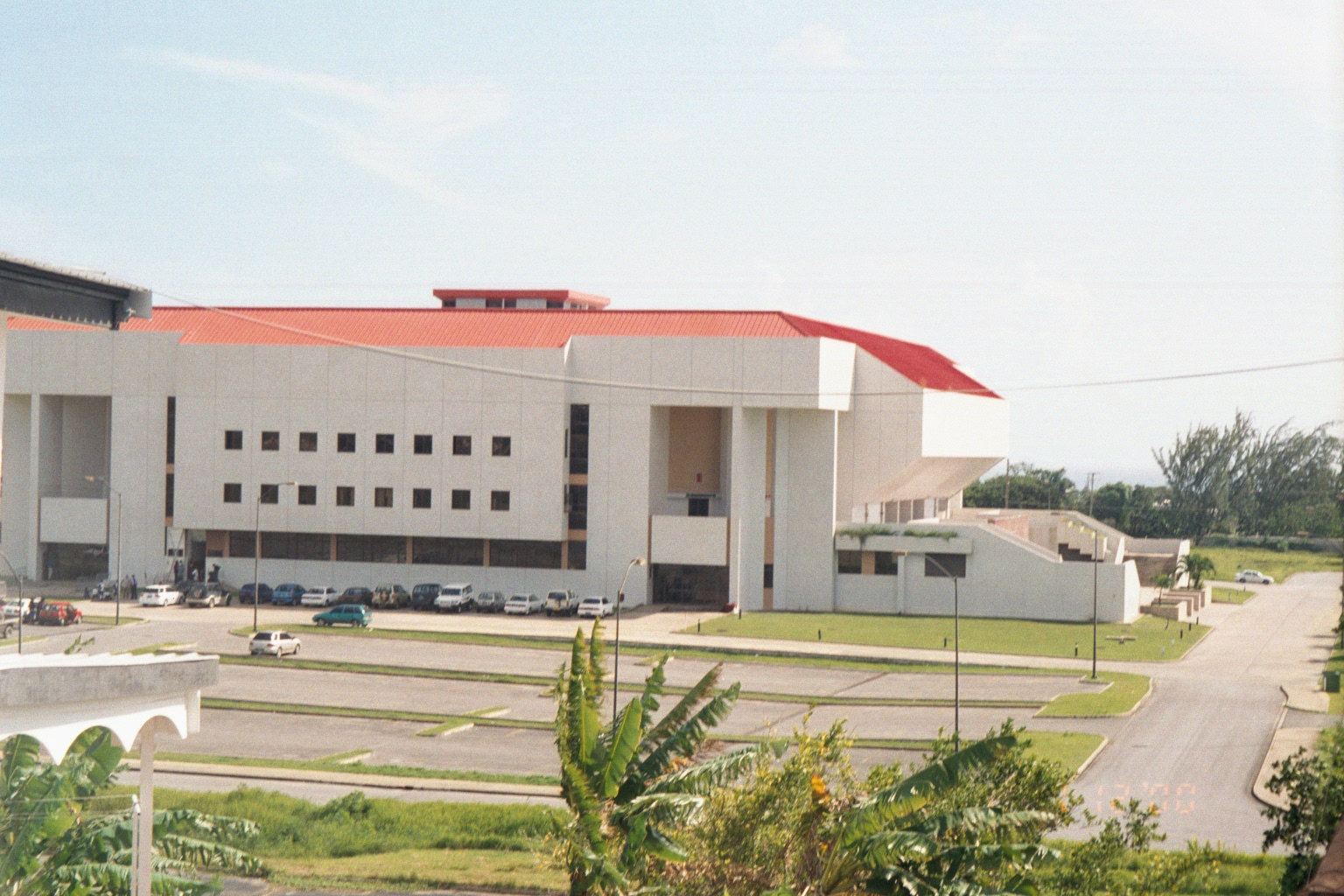
- Wildey Gymnasium from a hillside to the north.
- Interactive map of Garfield Sobers Gymnasium
- Location: Saint Michael, Barbados
- Coordinates: 13°05′27″N 59°34′34″W
- Owner: Ministry of Education, Youth Affairs and Sports
- Capacity: 5,000

Construction
- Opened: November 1992
- Renovated: 2005, 2017
- Architect: China State Construction

The Garfield Sobers Gymnasium (or occasionally the "Wildey Gym") is one of the main government-owned indoor sporting facilities located in the country of Barbados. Able to accommodate close to 5,000 people, it is situated northeast of the ABC Highway within the Sir Gary Sobers Sports Complex.

Normally hosting many student, professional as well as charity sporting events to the wider Barbadian community, it has also become home to song contests, entertainment shows, basketball, volleyball, and bodybuilding events in addition to badminton contests. "The Gymnasium" is located in the neighbourhood of Wildey, Saint Michael. Also found at the Sir Gary Sobers Sports Complex are tennis courts and an Aquatic Centre.

The Wildey Gymnasium was completed in November, 1992. In both 2005 and 2017 it underwent a sponsored refurbishment under grants by the Chinese government. In June 2017 a fire burned on the site located in some debris and refuse outside the main building during renovation construction.

The Garfield Sobers Sports Complex falls under the jurisdiction of the Ministry of Education, Youth Affairs and Sports.
