= 2004 Thomas & Uber Cup Preliminaries for Oceania =

Tournament details
- Dates: 31 January–1 February
- Nations: 2 (Men's team); 2 (Women's team)
- Venue: Ballarat Badminton Stadium
- Location: Ballarat, Australia

The 2004 Thomas & Uber Cup Preliminaries for Oceania was a continental badminton team championships in Oceania sanctioned by the Badminton World Federation. The tournament was held from 30 to 31 January 2004.

== Tournament ==
The 2004 Thomas & Uber Cup Preliminaries for Oceania was a continental team tournament of badminton held to determine the best men's and women's team in Oceania, who would qualify to 2004 Thomas & Uber Cup. This tournament was organized by Badminton Oceania and was sanctioned by the Badminton World Federation.

=== Venue ===
The tournament was held at the Ken Kay Badminton Stadium in Ballarat, Australia.

=== Competition format ===
With only two teams in contention, the two teams will compete in a single-elimination tie to earn qualification for the finals to be hosted in Jakarta.

== Men's team ==
=== New Zealand vs Australia ===
New Zealand
4
Ken Kay Badminton Stadium
1 February 2004

Australia
1

			1	2	3
1	(New Zealand) (Australia)	Geoffrey Bellingham; Stuart Gomez	15; 7	15; 7
2	(New Zealand) (Australia)	John Gordon; Hung Pham	15; 6	15; 8
3	(New Zealand) (Australia)	John Moody; Stuart Brehaut	11; 15	3; 15
4	(New Zealand) (Australia)	Geoffrey Bellingham / Craig Cooper; Ashley Brehaut / Travis Denney	15; 11	4; 15	15; 11
5	(New Zealand) (Australia)	John Gordon / John Moody; Boyd Cooper / Stuart Brehaut	15; 10	15; 11

== Women's team ==
=== New Zealand vs Australia ===
New Zealand
1
Ken Kay Badminton Stadium
31 January 2004

Australia
4

			1	2	3
1	(New Zealand) (Australia)	Rachel Hindley; Kellie Lucas	3; 11	2; 11
2	(New Zealand) (Australia)	Nicole Gordon; Jane Crabtree	7; 11	8; 11
3	(New Zealand) (Australia)	Rebecca Gordon; Lenny Permana	11; 4	2; 11	11; 8
4	(New Zealand) (Australia)	Sara Runesten-Petersen / Rebecca Gordon; Kate Wilson-Smith / Jane Crabtree	13; 15	8; 15
5	(New Zealand) (Australia)	Nicole Gordon / Lianne Shirley; Kellie Lucas / Lenny Permana	15; 8	10; 15	13; 15
