= 1963 Uber Cup =

Tournament details
- Dates: 1 – 6 April 1963
- Edition: 3rd
- Level: International
- Nations: 5
- Location: Boston, United States; New London, United States; Bronxville, United States; Wilmington, United States

The 1963 Uber Cup was the third edition of the Uber Cup, the women's badminton competition. The tournament took place in the 1962-63 badminton season, 11 countries competed.

Defending champions the United States hosted the final and claimed victory over England — their third consecutive victory, largely on the strength of Judy Devlin once again winning all three of her matches.

== Qualification ==
Four teams qualified for the interzone stage of the competition, Indonesia, New Zealand, Canada and England. The United States were exempted until the challenge round.

Means of qualification	Date	Venue	Slot	Qualified teams
1960 Uber Cup	4 – 9 April 1960	Baltimore; Boston; New Haven; Philadelphia	1	United States
Asian Zone	29 September – December 1962	Bangkok; Hong Kong	1	Indonesia
American Zone	–	–	1	Canada
European Zone	16 January – 18 February 1963	Copenhagen; Dublin; Edinburgh	1	England
Australasian Zone	–	–	1	New Zealand
Total			5	

== Knockout stage ==
The following four teams, shown by region, qualified for the 1963 Uber Cup. In the first round, both Canada and New Zealand suffered upsetting defeats to debutants England and Indonesia, losing 7–0 to the two teams respectively. In the semi-final clash, England defeated Indonesia 5–2 to enter the challenge round. The United States and England clashed in the final. 7 matches were played: 3 singles and 4 doubles (2 doubles, then reversed). The United States retained the Uber Cup for a third time after defeating the England 4–3.

=== Bracket ===
First round
United States
Bye
1 April 1963 – New London
New Zealand	0
Indonesia	7
1 April 1963 – Boston
Canada	0
England	7

Second round
United States
Bye
3 April 1963 – Bronxville
Indonesia	2
England	5

Challenge round
6 April 1963 – Wilmington
United States	4
England	3

=== First round ===
1 April 1963

New Zealand	0–7	Indonesia
Report

New London, United States

1 April 1963

Canada	0–7	England
Report

Boston, United States

=== Second round ===
3 April 1963

England	5–2	Indonesia
Report

Bronxville, United States

=== Challenge round ===
6 April 1963

United States	4–3	England
Report

Wilmington, United States

1963 Uber Cup winner

United States
Third title
