= Ireland national badminton team =

Irish national badminton team

Ireland
- Association: Badminton Ireland (BI)
- Confederation: BE (Europe)
- President: Cynthia Symth

BWF ranking
- Current ranking: 30 ▼2 (2 January 2024)
- Highest ranking: 21 (2 July 2019)

Sudirman Cup
- Appearances: 6 (first in 1991)
- Best result: Group stage

European Mixed Team Championships
- Appearances: 21 (first in 1972)
- Best result: Quarter-finals (1972, 1974, 1976, 1978, 1980, 1982, 2015)

European Men's Team Championships
- Appearances: 7 (first in 2006)
- Best result: Group stage

European Women's Team Championships
- Appearances: 6 (first in 2006)
- Best result: Group stage

Helvetia Cup
- Appearances: 15 (first in 1975)
- Best result: Champions (1981)

The Ireland national badminton team (Irish: Foireann náisiúnta badmantan na hÉireann) represents Ireland in international badminton team competitions. The national team is controlled by Badminton Ireland, the governing body for badminton in Ireland. Ireland has made multiple appearances in the Sudirman Cup. The team's best result was reaching the quarterfinals at the 2015 European Mixed Team Badminton Championships.

Former national player, Sam Magee was appointed as the main doubles coach while former Malaysian player, Iskandar Zulkarnain was appointed as the national team's singles coach.

== Participation in BWF competitions ==
=== Thomas Cup ===
Year	Round	Pos
1949	Did not qualify	
1952	Did not qualify	
1955	Did not qualify	
1958	Did not qualify	
1961	Did not qualify	
1964	Did not qualify	
1967	Did not qualify	
1970	Did not qualify	
1973	Did not qualify	
1976	Did not enter	
1979	Did not enter	
1982	Did not enter	
1984	Did not qualify	
1986	Did not qualify	
1988	Did not qualify	
1990	Did not qualify	
1992	Did not qualify	
1994	Did not qualify	
1996	Did not qualify	
1998
2000
2002	Did not qualify	
2004	Did not qualify	
2006	Did not qualify	

Sudirman Cup

Year	Result
1991	24th - Group 6
1993	26th - Group 6 Relegated
1995	30th - Group 7
1997	32nd - Group 5
2007	33rd - Group 5 Promoted
2019	22nd - Group 3

== Participation in European Team Badminton Championships ==
Men's Team

Year	Result
(Greece) 2006	Group stage
(Netherlands) 2008	Group stage
(Poland) 2010	Group stage
(Switzerland) 2014	Group stage
(Russia) 2016	Group stage
(Russia) 2018	Group stage
(France) 2020	Group stage
(Poland) 2024	Did not qualify
(Turkey) 2026	Did not qualify

Women's Team

Year	Result
(Greece) 2006	Group stage
(Netherlands) 2008	Group stage
(Switzerland) 2014	Group stage
(Russia) 2016	Group stage
(Russia) 2018	Group stage
(France) 2020	Group stage
(Poland) 2024	Did not qualify
(Turkey) 2026	Did not qualify

Mixed Team

Year	Result
(Sweden) 1972	Quarter-finalist
(Austria) 1974	Quarter-finalist
(Republic of Ireland) 1976	Quarter-finalist
(England) 1978	Quarter-finalist
(Netherlands) 1980	Quarter-finalist
(West Germany) 1982	Quarter-finalist
(England) 1984	Group stage
(Sweden) 1986	Group stage
(Norway) 1988	Group stage
(Soviet Union) 1990	Group stage
(Scotland) 1992	Group stage
(Netherlands) 1994	Group stage
(Denmark) 1996	Group stage
(Bulgaria) 1998	Group stage
(Denmark) 2008	Group stage
(England) 2009	Group stage
(Netherlands) 2011	Group stage
(Russia) 2013	Group stage
(Belgium) 2015	Quarter-finalist
(Poland) 2017	Group stage
(Denmark) 2019	Group stage
(Azerbaijan) 2025	Did not qualify

== Participation in Helvetia Cup ==
The Helvetia Cup or European B Team Championships was a European mixed team championship in badminton. The first Helvetia Cup tournament took place in Zürich, Switzerland in 1962. The tournament took place every two years from 1971 until 2007, after which it was dissolved.

Year	Result
(Belgium) 1975	Fourth place
(Soviet Union) 1977	(silver) Runner-up
(Austria) 1979	(silver) Runner-up
(Norway) 1981	(gold) Champion
(Switzerland) 1983	(bronze) Third place
(Poland) 1985	6th place
(Northern Ireland) 1987	(bronze) Third place
(Hungary) 1989	(bronze) Third place
(Bulgaria) 1991	(silver) Runner-up
(Austria) 1993	(bronze) Third place

Year	Result
(Northern Ireland) 1999	5th place
(Czech Republic) 2001	11th place
(Portugal) 2003	13th place
(Cyprus) 2005	11th place
(Iceland) 2007	(silver) Runner-up

== Junior competitive record ==
=== Suhandinata Cup ===
Year	Round	Pos
(China) 2000	Did not enter	
(South Africa) 2002	Did not enter	
(Canada) 2004	Did not enter	
(South Korea) 2006	Did not enter	
(New Zealand) 2007	Did not enter	
(India) 2008	Did not enter	
(Malaysia) 2009	Did not enter	
(Mexico) 2010	Did not enter	
(Taiwan) 2011	Did not enter	
(Japan) 2012	Group stage	26th of 30
(Thailand) 2013	Did not enter	
(Malaysia) 2014	Did not enter	
(Peru) 2015	Did not enter	
(Spain) 2016	Did not enter	
(Indonesia) 2017	Did not enter	
(Canada) 2018	Did not enter	
(Russia) 2019	Did not enter	
(New Zealand) 2020	Cancelled because of COVID-19 pandemic	
(China) 2021	Cancelled because of COVID-19 pandemic	
(Spain) 2022	Did not enter	
(United States) 2023	Did not enter	
(China) 2024	Did not enter	
(India) 2025	Group stage	23rd of 36

=== European Junior Team Championships ===
==== Mixed team ====
Year	Result
(Poland) 2015	Group stage
(France) 2017	Group stage
(Estonia) 2018	Group stage
(Serbia) 2022	Group stage
(Spain) 2024	Group stage

== Players ==
=== Current squad ===
Squads for European Team Championships Qualifiers

==== Men's team ====
Name	World Rank		
Name	MS	MD	XD
Nhat Nguyen	25	1440	—
Joshua Magee	2125	559	143
Paul Reynolds	—	89	1252
Scott Guildea	—	89	1019
Dylan Noble	892	—	—
Matthew Cheung	629	559	—

==== Women's team ====
Name	Ranking of event		
Name	WS	WD	XD
Sophia Noble	143	746	—
Siofra Flynn	265	174	—
Michelle Shochan	436	746	—
Orla Flynn	—	174	—
