= Arab Badminton Championships =

Regional badminton championships

- Current season, competition or edition: 2026 Arab Badminton Championships
- Sport: Badminton
- Founded: 1996; 30 years ago
- Most recent champion: Algeria
- Website: arabbadminton.com

The Arab Badminton Championships (Arabic: البطولة العربية للريشة الطائرة) is a regional badminton tournament organized by the Arab Badminton Federation (ABF) to crown the best badminton players and teams in the Arab world. The inaugural edition of the championships was hosted in 1996 in Damascus, Syria. Syria also hosted the second edition of the championships in 1998.

The first four editions of the championships featured only four events, the events being men's singles, women's singles, the men's team event and the women's team event. Doubles events were later introduced in the fifth edition of the championships hosted in Amman, Jordan.

== Nations participating ==
- Algeria (from 2002)
- Bahrain (from 1996)
- Djibouti (from 2024)
- Egypt (from 2000)
- Iraq (from 1996)
- Jordan (from 1996)
- Kuwait (from 2024)
- Lebanon (from 2000)
- Libya (from 2017)
- Mauritania (from 2009)
- Morocco (from 2009)
- Oman (from 2021)
- Palestine (from 1996)
- Qatar (from 2024)
- Saudi Arabia (from 2017)
- Sudan (from 2004)
- Syria (from 1996)
- Tunisia (from 2017)

== Championships ==
Year	Number	Host city	Host country	Events	Top Nation
1996	1	Damascus	Syria	4	
1998	2	Damascus	Syria	4	
2000	3	Beirut	Lebanon	4	Syria
2001	~~4~~	Casablanca	Morocco	-	Syria
2002	4	Damascus	Syria	4	Syria
2004	5	Amman	Jordan	7	Syria
2008	~~6~~	Casablanca	Morocco	-	Syria
2009	6	Amman	Jordan	7	Syria
2011	7	Aqaba	Jordan	7	Syria
2017	8	Tunis	Tunisia	7	Algeria
2021	9	Hamad Town	Bahrain	5	Jordan
2024	10	Riyadh	Saudi Arabia	5	Algeria
2026	11	Cairo	Egypt	5	Algeria

== Past winners ==
=== Individual event ===
Year	Men's singles	Women's singles	Men's doubles	Women's doubles	Mixed doubles
1996			Not held		
1998			Not held		
2000	(Syria) Ismat Khalil	(Syria) Eva Katrib	Not held		
~~2001~~	Cancelled				
2002	(Syria) Tareq Shalhoum	(Syria) Hadil Kareem	Not held		
2004	(Syria) Bassel Al-Durrah	(Syria) Hadil Kareem	(Syria) Bassel Al-Durrah (Syria) Tareq Shalhoum	(Syria) Eva Katrib (Syria) Hadil Kareem	(Syria) Tareq Shalhoum (Syria) Hadil Kareem
2009	(Syria) Ammar Awad	(Syria) Hadil Kareem	(Syria) Bassel Al-Durrah (Syria) Nawras Abdul Wahid	(Syria) Bushra Muhawesh (Syria) Hadil Kareem	(Syria) Bassel Al-Durrah (Syria) Hadil Kareem
2011	(Syria) Ammar Awad	(Syria) Sanaa Mahmoud	(Syria) Ammar Awad (Syria) Mohammad Saleh	(Syria) Hadil Kareem (Syria) Sanaa Mahmoud	(Syria) Jehad Kareem (Syria) Hadil Kareem
2017	(Algeria) Youcef Sabri Medel	(Algeria) Halla Bouksani	(Bahrain) Adnan Ebrahim (Bahrain) Jaffar Ebrahim	(Algeria) Halla Bouksani (Algeria) Yasmina Chibah	(Algeria) Youcef Sabri Medel (Algeria) Ferd Houda
2021	(Bahrain) Adnan Ebrahim	(Jordan) Domou Amro	(Algeria) Koceila Mammeri (Algeria) Youcef Sabri Medel	(Jordan) Domou Amro (Jordan) Marah Omar	(Egypt) Adham Hatem Elgamal (Egypt) Doha Hany
2024	(Bahrain) Adnan Ebrahim	(Egypt) Nour Ahmed Youssri	(Algeria) Sifeddine Larbaoui (Algeria) Youcef Sabri Medel	(Algeria) Yasmina Chibah (Algeria) Linda Mazri	(Jordan) Bahaedeen Ahmad Alshannik (Jordan) Domou Amro
2026	(Bahrain) Adnan Ebrahim	(Saudi Arabia) Khadijah Kawthar	(Algeria) Koceila Mammeri (Algeria) Youcef Sabri Medel	(Algeria) Sirine Ibrahim (Algeria) Tanina Mammeri	(Algeria) Koceila Mammeri (Algeria) Tanina Mammeri

=== Team event ===
Year	Country	Venue	Men's team			Women's team		
Year	Country	Venue	Champion	Runner-up	Bronze	Champion	Runner-up	Bronze
1996	Syria	Damascus	Syria	Jordan	Bahrain	Syria	Jordan	Bahrain
1998	Syria	Damascus	Syria	Jordan	Bahrain	Syria	Jordan	Bahrain
2000	Lebanon	Beirut	Syria	Egypt	Jordan; Iraq	Syria	Egypt	Jordan; Lebanon
~~2001~~	Morocco	Casablanca	Cancelled			Cancelled		
2002	Syria	Damascus	Syria	Egypt	Jordan	Syria	Egypt	Algeria
2004	Jordan	Amman	Syria	Egypt	Jordan	Syria	Jordan	Egypt
~~2008~~	Morocco	Casablanca	Cancelled			Cancelled		
2009	Jordan	Amman	Syria	Egypt	Jordan; Bahrain	Syria	Jordan	Egypt; Jordan B
2011	Jordan	Aqaba	Syria	Jordan	Iraq	Syria	Jordan	Iraq
2017	Tunisia	Tunis	Bahrain	Algeria	Morocco	Algeria	Tunisia	Sudan
2021	Bahrain	Hamad Town	Not held			Not held		
2024	Saudi Arabia	Riyadh	Not held			Not held		
2026	Egypt	Cairo	Not held			Not held		

== Junior results ==
=== Team event (U19) ===
Year	Country	Venue	Men's team			Women's team		
Year	Country	Venue	Champion	Runner-up	Bronze	Champion	Runner-up	Bronze
2003	Egypt	Cairo	Syria	Jordan	Bahrain	Syria	Jordan	Bahrain
~~2004~~	Morocco	Casablanca	Not held			Not held		
2005	Jordan	Amman	Syria	Jordan	Iraq	Syria	Egypt	Jordan
2007	Syria	Tartous	Syria	Jordan	Iraq	Jordan	Syria	Egypt
2009	Syria	Damascus	Syria	Egypt	Jordan	Syria	Jordan	Iraq
2016	Algeria	Algiers	Algeria	Jordan	Iraq	Algeria	Iraq	Jordan
2022	Kuwait	Shuwaikh	Not held			Not held		
