= 2023 Badminton Asia Championships =

Badminton tournament, Dubai, United Arab Emirates

Tournament details
- Dates: 25 April – 30 April
- Venue: Sheikh Rashid Bin Hamdan Indoor Hall
- Location: Dubai, United Arab Emirates

Champions
- Men's singles: (Indonesia) Anthony Sinisuka Ginting
- Women's singles: (Chinese Taipei) Tai Tzu-ying
- Men's doubles: (India) Satwiksairaj Rankireddy (India) Chirag Shetty
- Women's doubles: (Japan) Yuki Fukushima (Japan) Sayaka Hirota
- Mixed doubles: (China) Jiang Zhenbang (China) Wei Yaxin

The 2023 Badminton Asia Championships (officially known as the KhiladiX.com Dubai Badminton Asia Championship 2023 Powered by Floki for sponsorship reasons) was a badminton tournament held at the Sheikh Rashid Bin Hamdan Indoor Hall in Dubai, United Arab Emirates from 25 to 30 April 2023.

== Tournament ==
The 2023 Badminton Asia Championships is the 40th edition of the Badminton Asia Championships. This tournament is hosted by the United Arab Emirates Badminton Federation, with the sanction of Badminton Asia.

=== Venue ===
This international tournament is held at the Sheikh Rashid Bin Hamdan Indoor Hall in Dubai, United Arab Emirates.

=== Point distribution ===
This tournament is graded based on the BWF points system equivalent to the BWF World Tour Super 1000 event.

Winner	Runner-up	3/4	5/8	9/16	17/32	33/64
12,000	10,200	8,400	6,600	4,800	3,000	1,200

== Medal summary ==
=== Medalists ===
Event	Gold	Silver	Bronze
Men's singles	(Indonesia) Anthony Sinisuka Ginting	(Singapore) Loh Kean Yew	(China) Lu Guangzu
Men's singles	(Indonesia) Anthony Sinisuka Ginting	(Singapore) Loh Kean Yew	(Japan) Kanta Tsuneyama
Women's singles	(Chinese Taipei) Tai Tzu-ying	(South Korea) An Se-young	(Japan) Akane Yamaguchi
Women's singles	(Chinese Taipei) Tai Tzu-ying	(South Korea) An Se-young	(China) Chen Yufei
Men's doubles	(India) Satwiksairaj Rankireddy (India) Chirag Shetty	(Malaysia) Ong Yew Sin (Malaysia) Teo Ee Yi	(Japan) Takuro Hoki (Japan) Yugo Kobayashi
Men's doubles	(India) Satwiksairaj Rankireddy (India) Chirag Shetty	(Malaysia) Ong Yew Sin (Malaysia) Teo Ee Yi	(Chinese Taipei) Lee Yang (Chinese Taipei) Wang Chi-lin
Women's doubles	(Japan) Yuki Fukushima (Japan) Sayaka Hirota	(South Korea) Baek Ha-na (South Korea) Lee So-hee	(Thailand) Jongkolphan Kititharakul (Thailand) Rawinda Prajongjai
Women's doubles	(Japan) Yuki Fukushima (Japan) Sayaka Hirota	(South Korea) Baek Ha-na (South Korea) Lee So-hee	(Japan) Mayu Matsumoto (Japan) Wakana Nagahara
Mixed doubles	(China) Jiang Zhenbang (China) Wei Yaxin	(China) Zheng Siwei (China) Huang Yaqiong	(Malaysia) Goh Soon Huat (Malaysia) Shevon Jemie Lai
Mixed doubles	(China) Jiang Zhenbang (China) Wei Yaxin	(China) Zheng Siwei (China) Huang Yaqiong	(Indonesia) Dejan Ferdinansyah (Indonesia) Gloria Emanuelle Widjaja

=== Medal table ===
* Host nation (United Arab Emirates)

Rank	Nation	Gold	Silver	Bronze	Total
1	China	1	1	2	4
2	Japan	1	0	4	5
3	Chinese Taipei	1	0	1	2
3	Indonesia	1	0	1	2
5	India	1	0	0	1
6	South Korea	0	2	0	2
7	Malaysia	0	1	1	2
8	Singapore	0	1	0	1
9	Thailand	0	0	1	1
Totals (9 entries)		5	5	10	20

== Qualification ==
=== Final standings ===
Group	Men's singles	Women's singles	Men's doubles	Women's doubles	Mixed doubles
A	(Maldives) Hussein Zayan Shaheed	(Sri Lanka) Rashmi Mudalige	(Vietnam) Nguyễn Đình Hoàng (Vietnam) Trần Đình Mạnh	(Hong Kong) Lui Lok Lok (Hong Kong) Ng Wing Yung	(Sri Lanka) Chamath Dias (Sri Lanka) Natasha Gunasekera
B	(Nepal) Prince Dahal	(Kazakhstan) Kamila Smagulova	(United Arab Emirates) Dev Ayyappan (United Arab Emirates) Dhiren Ayyappan	(Philippines) Alyssa Leonardo (Philippines) Thea Pomar	(Vietnam) Phạm Văn Hải (Vietnam) Thân Vân Anh
C	(United Arab Emirates) Bharath Latheesh	(Myanmar) Thet Htar Thuzar	(Thailand) Tanadon Punpanich (Thailand) Wachirawit Sothon	(Chinese Taipei) Hsieh Pei-shan (Chinese Taipei) Tseng Yu-chi	(India) Rohan Kapoor (India) N. Sikki Reddy
D	(Philippines) Jewel Angelo Albo	(Hong Kong) Yeung Sum Yee	(Singapore) Andy Kwek (Singapore) Loh Kean Hean	(Malaysia) Ng Qi Xuan (Malaysia) Teoh Le Xuan	(Thailand) Ratchapol Makkasasithorn (Thailand) Chasinee Korepap

== Men's singles ==
=== Seeds ===
1. (Indonesia) Jonatan Christie (First Round)
2. (Indonesia) Anthony Sinisuka Ginting (Champion)
3. (Malaysia) Lee Zii Jia (First Round)
4. (Japan) Kodai Naraoka (Quarter-finals)
5. (Chinese Taipei) Chou Tien-chen (Second Round)
6. (Thailand) Kunlavut Vitidsarn (Second Round)
7. (Singapore) Loh Kean Yew (Final)
8. (India) Prannoy H. S. (Quarter-finals)

=== Finals ===
Semifinal
7	(Singapore) Loh Kean Yew	21	21
(China) Lu Guangzu	19	15
(Japan) Kanta Tsuneyama	13	16
2	(Indonesia) Anthony Sinisuka Ginting	21	21

Final
7	(Singapore) Loh Kean Yew	12	8
2	(Indonesia) Anthony Sinisuka Ginting	21	21

=== Top half ===
==== Section 1 ====
First round
1	(Indonesia) J Christie
(China) Shi YQ	w	/	o
(Hong Kong) Lee C Y	21	21
(Malaysia) Ng T Y	17	18
7	(Singapore) Loh K Y	21	23
(India) L Sen	7	21
(Jordan) B A Alshannik	21	21
A1	(Maldives) H Z Shaheed	11	13

Second round
(China) Shi YQ	18	18
(Hong Kong) Lee C Y	21	21
7	(Singapore) Loh K Y	21	21
(Jordan) B A Alshannik	14	14

Quarter final
(Hong Kong) Lee C Y	19	19
7	(Singapore) Loh K Y	21	21

==== Section 2 ====
First round
4	(Japan) K Naraoka	21	21
C1	(United Arab Emirates) B Latheesh	4	6
(India) S Kidambi	21	21
(Bahrain) A Ebrahim	13	8
5	(Chinese Taipei) Chou T-c	21	21
(Vietnam) Nguyễn H Đ	13	17
(China) Lu GZ	21	21
(Thailand) K Wangcharoen	12	16

Second round
4	(Japan) K Naraoka	21	20	21
(India) S Kidambi	14	22	9
5	(Chinese Taipei) Chou T-c	21	14	8
(China) Lu GZ	19	21	21

Quarter final
4	(Japan) K Naraoka	19	9
(China) Lu GZ	21	21

=== Bottom half ===
==== Section 3 ====
First round
(Kazakhstan) D Panarin	13	11
(Indonesia) C A Dwi Wardoyo	21	21
(Myanmar) Phone P Naing	14	9
8	(India) Prannoy H. S.	21	21
B1	(Nepal) P Dahal	7	13
(Japan) K Tsuneyama	21	21
(Hong Kong) Ng K L	21	21
3	(Malaysia) Lee Z J	19	16

Second round
(Indonesia) C A Dwi Wardoyo	16	21	18
8	(India) Prannoy H. S.	21	5	21
(Japan) K Tsuneyama	13	21	21
(Hong Kong) Ng K L	21	19	11

Quarter final
8	(India) Prannoy H. S.	11	9^{r}
(Japan) K Tsuneyama	21	13

==== Section 4 ====
First round
(China) Li SF	21	21
(South Korea) Jeon H-j	10	18
(Sri Lanka) V Nettasinghe	12	7
6	(Thailand) K Vitidsarn	21	21
(Japan) K Nishimoto	21	21
D1	(Philippines) J A Albo	7	17
(Chinese Taipei) Wang T-w	16	17
2	(Indonesia) A S Ginting	21	21

Second round
(China) Li SF	21	21
6	(Thailand) K Vitidsarn	13	15
(Japan) K Nishimoto	18	17
2	(Indonesia) A S Ginting	21	21

Quarter final
(China) Li SF	21	21	24
2	(Indonesia) A S Ginting	10	23	26

== Women's singles ==
=== Seeds ===
1. (Japan) Akane Yamaguchi (Semi-finals)
2. (South Korea) An Se-young (Final)
3. (China) Chen Yufei (Semi-finals)
4. (Chinese Taipei) Tai Tzu-ying (Champion)
5. (China) He Bingjiao (Quarter-finals)
6. (China) Wang Zhiyi (Quarter-finals)
7. (Thailand) Ratchanok Intanon (withdrew)
8. (India) P. V. Sindhu (Quarter-finals)

=== Finals ===
Semifinal
1	(Japan) Akane Yamaguchi	12	21	15
4	(Chinese Taipei) Tai Tzu-ying	21	16	21
3	(China) Chen Yufei	21	11	19
2	(South Korea) An Se-young	16	21	21

Final
4	(Chinese Taipei) Tai Tzu-ying	21	21
2	(South Korea) An Se-young	10	14

=== Top half ===
==== Section 1 ====
First round
1	(Japan) A Yamaguchi	25	21
(India) M Bansod	23	19
(Indonesia) P K Wardani	16	13
(Chinese Taipei) Sung S-y	21	21
6	(China) Wang ZY	21	23
C1	(Myanmar) Thet Htar T	11	21
(Malaysia) Kisona S	21	15	13
(Thailand) P Chochuwong	18	21	21

Second round
1	(Japan) A Yamaguchi	21	21
(Chinese Taipei) Sung S-y	17	13
6	(China) Wang ZY	w	/	o
(Thailand) P Chochuwong

Quarter final
1	(Japan) A Yamaguchi	13	21	21
6	(China) Wang ZY	21	14	17

==== Section 2 ====
First round
4	(Chinese Taipei) Tai T-y	21	21
(Singapore) Yeo J M	17	18
(Thailand) S Katethong	11	18
(Japan) N Nidaira	21	21
5	(China) He BJ	21	21
(South Korea) Kim G-e	15	17
PFQ	(Vietnam) Nguyễn T L	21	21
B1	(Kazakhstan) K Smagulova	8	6

Second round
4	(Chinese Taipei) Tai T-y	21	21
(Japan) N Nidaira	18	6
5	(China) He BJ	21	21
PFQ	(Vietnam) Nguyễn T L	16	17

Quarter final
4	(Chinese Taipei) Tai T-y	14	21	21
5	(China) He BJ	21	16	18

=== Bottom half ===
==== Section 3 ====
First round
(Indonesia) G M Tunjung	19	21	21
(Chinese Taipei) Pai Y-p	21	11	7
(India) A Kashyap	6	12
PFQ	(Indonesia) K A C Dewi	21	21
D1	(Hong Kong) Yeung S Y	14	1
(Japan) A Ohori	21	21
(South Korea) Sim Y-j	11	7
3	(China) Chen YF	21	21

Second round
(Indonesia) G M Tunjung	15	21	21
PFQ	(Indonesia) K A C Dewi	21	13	18
(Japan) A Ohori	15	15
3	(China) Chen YF	21	21

Quarter final
(Indonesia) G M Tunjung	10	21	13
3	(China) Chen YF	21	19	21

==== Section 4 ====
First round
(Japan) S Kawakami	18	14
(China) Han Y	21	21
(Chinese Taipei) Hsu W-c	15	20
8	(India) P. V. Sindhu	21	22
(Thailand) B Ongbamrungphan	21	21
A1	(Sri Lanka) R Mudalige	3	7
(Malaysia) Goh J W	10	8
2	(South Korea) An S-y	21	21

Second round
(China) Han Y	12	15
8	(India) P. V. Sindhu	21	21
(Thailand) B Ongbamrungphan	19	16
2	(South Korea) An S-y	21	21

Quarter final
8	(India) P. V. Sindhu	21	5	9
2	(South Korea) An S-y	18	21	21

== Men's doubles ==
=== Seeds ===
1. (Indonesia) Fajar Alfian / Muhammad Rian Ardianto (Quarter-finals)
2. (Malaysia) Aaron Chia / Soh Wooi Yik (Second Round)
3. (Indonesia) Mohammad Ahsan / Hendra Setiawan (Quarter-finals)
4. (Japan) Takuro Hoki / Yugo Kobayashi (Semi-finals)
5. (China) Liu Yuchen / Ou Xuanyi (Second Round)
6. (India) Satwiksairaj Rankireddy / Chirag Shetty (Champions)
7. (China) Liang Weikeng / Wang Chang (Quarter-finals)
8. (Malaysia) Ong Yew Sin / Teo Ee Yi (Final)

=== Finals ===
Semifinal
8	(Malaysia) Ong Yew Sin (Malaysia) Teo Ee Yi	21	26
4	(Japan) Takuro Hoki (Japan) Yugo Kobayashi	16	24
6	(India) Satwiksairaj Rankireddy (India) Chirag Shetty	21	13
(Chinese Taipei) Lee Yang (Chinese Taipei) Wang Chi-lin	18	14^{r}

Final
8	(Malaysia) Ong Yew Sin (Malaysia) Teo Ee Yi	21	17	19
6	(India) Satwiksairaj Rankireddy (India) Chirag Shetty	16	21	21

=== Top half ===
==== Section 1 ====
First round
1	(Indonesia) F Alfian (Indonesia) M R Ardianto	21	21
(China) He JT (China) Zhou HD	16	18
(Chinese Taipei) Lee J-h (Chinese Taipei) Yang P-hs	21	21
A1	(Vietnam) Nguyen Đ H (Vietnam) Tran Đ M	13	9
8	(Malaysia) Ong Y S (Malaysia) Teo E Y	12	21	21
(India) M R Arjun (India) D Kapila	21	16	12
(South Korea) Kang M-h (South Korea) Seo S-j	17	21
(Japan) A Endo (Japan) Y Takei	21	23

Second round
1	(Indonesia) F Alfian (Indonesia) M R Ardianto	21	21
(Chinese Taipei) Lee J-h (Chinese Taipei) Yang P-hs	14	12
8	(Malaysia) Ong Y S (Malaysia) Teo E Y	10	21	22
(Japan) A Endo (Japan) Y Takei	21	15	20

Quarter final
1	(Indonesia) F Alfian (Indonesia) M R Ardianto	20	15
8	(Malaysia) Ong Y S (Malaysia) Teo E Y	22	21

==== Section 2 ====
First round
4	(Japan) T Hoki (Japan) Y Kobayashi	21	21
(India) K P Garaga (India) V G Panjala	15	17
(Malaysia) Man W C (Malaysia) Tee K W	21	21
PFQ	(India) P S Ravikrishna (India) S P Udayakumar	12	17
5	(China) Liu YC (China) Ou XY	21	21
PFQ	(Philippines) C Bernardo (Philippines) A Morada	18	12
D1	(Singapore) A Kwek (Singapore) Loh K H	19	15
(Indonesia) M S Fikri (Indonesia) B Maulana	21	21

Second round
4	(Japan) T Hoki (Japan) Y Kobayashi	21	11
(Malaysia) Man W C (Malaysia) Tee K W	14	3^{r}
5	(China) Liu YC (China) Ou XY	23	17	20
(Indonesia) M S Fikri (Indonesia) B Maulana	21	21	22

Quarter final
4	(Japan) T Hoki (Japan) Y Kobayashi	21	21
(Indonesia) M S Fikri (Indonesia) B Maulana	14	17

=== Bottom half ===
==== Section 3 ====
First round
(South Korea) Jin Y (South Korea) Na S-s	21	21
(Chinese Taipei) Su C-h (Chinese Taipei) Ye H-w	18	12
(Malaysia) Tan K M (Malaysia) Tan W K	14	17
6	(India) S Rankireddy (India) C Shetty	21	21
(China) Ren XY (China) Tan Q	21	21
(Japan) A Koga (Japan) T Saito	19	17
B1	(United Arab Emirates) De. Ayyappan (United Arab Emirates) Dh. Ayyappan	14	17
3	(Indonesia) M Ahsan (Indonesia) H Setiawan	21	21

Second round
(South Korea) Jin Y (South Korea) Na S-s	13	11
6	(India) S Rankireddy (India) C Shetty	21	21
(China) Ren XY (China) Tan Q	17	20
3	(Indonesia) M Ahsan (Indonesia) H Setiawan	21	22

Quarter final
6	(India) S Rankireddy (India) C Shetty	21	21
3	(Indonesia) M Ahsan (Indonesia) H Setiawan	11	12

==== Section 4 ====
First round
(South Korea) Choi S-g (South Korea) Kim W-h	21	21
(Thailand) S Jomkoh (Thailand) K Kedren	15	15
C1	(Thailand) T Punpanich (Thailand) W Sothon	14	16
7	(China) Liang WK (China) Wang C	21	21
(Chinese Taipei) Lee Y (Chinese Taipei) Wang C-l	21	21
(Japan) K Matsui (Japan) Y Takeuchi	10	16
(Indonesia) L R Carnando (Indonesia) D Marthin	21	19	20
2	(Malaysia) A Chia (Malaysia) Soh W Y	19	21	22

Second round
(South Korea) Choi S-g (South Korea) Kim W-h	17	21	19
7	(China) Liang WK (China) Wang C	21	19	21
(Chinese Taipei) Lee Y (Chinese Taipei) Wang C-l	14	21	21
2	(Malaysia) A Chia (Malaysia) Soh W Y	21	16	19

Quarter final
7	(China) Liang WK (China) Wang C	18	21	8
(Chinese Taipei) Lee Y (Chinese Taipei) Wang C-l	21	15	21

== Women's doubles ==
=== Seeds ===
1. (China) Chen Qingchen / Jia Yifan (Quarter-finals)
2. (Japan) Nami Matsuyama / Chiharu Shida (First Round)
3. (South Korea) Kim So-yeong / Kong Hee-yong (Second Round)
4. (China) Zhang Shuxian / Zheng Yu (Second Round)
5. (Indonesia) Apriyani Rahayu / Siti Fadia Silva Ramadhanti (First Round)
6. (South Korea) Jeong Na-eun / Kim Hye-jeong (Quarter-finals)
7. (Japan) Yuki Fukushima / Sayaka Hirota (Champions)
8. (Malaysia) Pearly Tan / Thinaah Muralitharan (withdrew)

=== Finals ===
Semifinal
7	(Japan) Yuki Fukushima (Japan) Sayaka Hirota	21	21
(Thailand) Jongkolphan Kititharakul (Thailand) Rawinda Prajongjai	18	15
(Japan) Mayu Matsumoto (Japan) Wakana Nagahara	21	8	13
(South Korea) Baek Ha-na (South Korea) Lee So-hee	16	21	21

Final
7	(Japan) Yuki Fukushima (Japan) Sayaka Hirota	21	21
(South Korea) Baek Ha-na (South Korea) Lee So-hee	7	14

=== Top half ===
==== Section 1 ====
First round
1	(China) Chen QC (China) Jia YF	21	21
D1	(Malaysia) Ng Q X (Malaysia) Teoh L X	3	10
(India) K A Bhat (India) S Gautam	22	12	18
(Indonesia) M T Puspita Sari (Indonesia) R A Rose	20	21	21
7	(Japan) Y Fukushima (Japan) S Hirota	21	21
(Chinese Taipei) Lee C-h (Chinese Taipei) Teng C-h	11	12
(South Korea) Lee Y-l (South Korea) Shin S-c	21	21
(Singapore) Jin YJ (Singapore) C Wong	14	12

Second round
1	(China) Chen QC (China) Jia YF	21	21
(Indonesia) M T Puspita Sari (Indonesia) R A Rose	9	11
7	(Japan) Y Fukushima (Japan) S Hirota	21	21
(South Korea) Lee Y-l (South Korea) Shin S-c	12	15

Quarter final
1	(China) Chen QC (China) Jia YF	20	15
7	(Japan) Y Fukushima (Japan) S Hirota	22	21

==== Section 2 ====
First round
3	(South Korea) Kim S-y (South Korea) Kong H-y	18	21	22
(Japan) R Iwanaga (Japan) K Nakanishi	21	18	20
(Indonesia) F D Kusuma (Indonesia) A C Pratiwi	23	14	21
(Chinese Taipei) Chang C-h (Chinese Taipei) Yang C-t	21	21	15
PFQ	(India) H Manazhiyil (India) A Roy	11	2
(Thailand) J Kititharakul (Thailand) R Prajongjai	21	21
C1	(Chinese Taipei) Hsieh P-s (Chinese Taipei) Tseng Y-c	18	11
(Hong Kong) Yeung N T (Hong Kong) Yeung P L	21	21

Second round
3	(South Korea) Kim S-y (South Korea) Kong H-y	16	16
(Indonesia) F D Kusuma (Indonesia) A C Pratiwi	21	21
(Thailand) J Kititharakul (Thailand) R Prajongjai	21	21
(Hong Kong) Yeung N T (Hong Kong) Yeung P L	9	14

Quarter final
(Indonesia) F D Kusuma (Indonesia) A C Pratiwi	21	18	11
(Thailand) J Kititharakul (Thailand) R Prajongjai	16	21	21

=== Bottom half ===
==== Section 3 ====
First round
(India) G Gopichand (India) T Jolly	17	21	21
(Indonesia) L T Mayasari (Indonesia) R Sugiarto	21	17	18
(Thailand) S Paewsampran (Thailand) P Supajirakul	17	14
6	(South Korea) Jeong N-e (South Korea) Kim H-j	21	21
A1	(Hong Kong) Lui L L (Hong Kong) Ng W Y	13	9
(Japan) M Matsumoto (Japan) W Nagahara	21	21
(Malaysia) V Hoo (Malaysia) Lim C S	15	12
4	(China) Zhang SX (China) Zheng Y	21	21

Second round
(India) G Gopichand (India) T Jolly
6	(South Korea) Jeong N-e (South Korea) Kim H-j	w	/	o
(Japan) M Matsumoto (Japan) W Nagahara	21	20	21
4	(China) Zhang SX (China) Zheng Y	17	22	14

Quarter final
6	(South Korea) Jeong N-e (South Korea) Kim H-j	18	13
(Japan) M Matsumoto (Japan) W Nagahara	21	21

==== Section 4 ====
First round
(Chinese Taipei) Hsu Y-c (Chinese Taipei) Lin W-c	21	21
(Hong Kong) Ng T Y (Hong Kong) Tsang H Y	18	14
(Thailand) B Aimsaard (Thailand) N Aimsaard	21	21
5	(Indonesia) A Rahayu (Indonesia) S F S Ramadhanti	18	11
B1	(Philippines) A Leonardo (Philippines) T Pomar	14	13
(China) Li YJ (China) Luo XM	21	21
(South Korea) Baek H-n (South Korea) Lee S-h	21	21
2	(Japan) N Matsuyama (Japan) C Shida	9	11

Second round
(Chinese Taipei) Hsu Y-c (Chinese Taipei) Lin W-c	9	15
(Thailand) B Aimsaard (Thailand) N Aimsaard	21	21
(China) Li YJ (China) Luo XM	12	21	14
(South Korea) Baek H-n (South Korea) Lee S-h	21	15	21

Quarter final
(Thailand) B Aimsaard (Thailand) N Aimsaard	17	12
(South Korea) Baek H-n (South Korea) Lee S-h	21	21

== Mixed doubles ==
=== Seeds ===
1. (China) Zheng Siwei / Huang Yaqiong (Final)
2. (Japan) Yuta Watanabe / Arisa Higashino (withdrew)
3. (Thailand) Dechapol Puavaranukroh / Sapsiree Taerattanachai (First Round)
4. (South Korea) Seo Seung-jae / Chae Yoo-jung (Second Round)
5. (Malaysia) Tan Kian Meng / Lai Pei Jing (First Round)
6. (China) Feng Yanzhe / Huang Dongping (First Round)
7. (South Korea) Kim Won-ho / Jeong Na-eun (First Round)
8. (Malaysia) Goh Soon Huat / Shevon Jemie Lai (Semi-finals)

=== Finals ===
Semifinal
1	(China) Zheng Siwei (China) Huang Yaqiong	21	21
8	(Malaysia) Goh Soon Huat (Malaysia) Shevon Jemie Lai	11	13
(Indonesia) Dejan Ferdinansyah (Indonesia) Gloria Emanuelle Widjaja	17	15
(China) Jiang Zhenbang (China) Wei Yaxin	21	21

Final
1	(China) Zheng Siwei (China) Huang Yaqiong	15	16
(China) Jiang Zhenbang (China) Wei Yaxin	21	21

=== Top half ===
==== Section 1 ====
First round
1	(China) Zheng SW (China) Huang YQ	21	21
D1	(Thailand) R Makkasasithorn (Thailand) C Korepap	13	4
(Singapore) T Hee (Singapore) J Tan	21	21
(Chinese Taipei) Lee J-h (Chinese Taipei) Hsu Y-c	14	16
7	(South Korea) Kim W-h (South Korea) Jeong N-e	14	13
(Malaysia) Chen T J (Malaysia) Toh E W	21	21
(Indonesia) P Jordan (Indonesia) M D Oktavianti	21	21
(Japan) K Yamashita (Japan) N Shinoya	17	16

Second round
1	(China) Zheng SW (China) Huang YQ	21	21
(Singapore) T Hee (Singapore) J Tan	13	9
(Malaysia) Chen T J (Malaysia) Toh E W	21	21	15
(Indonesia) P Jordan (Indonesia) M D Oktavianti	23	18	21

Quarter final
1	(China) Zheng SW (China) Huang YQ	21	21
(Indonesia) P Jordan (Indonesia) M D Oktavianti	11	17

==== Section 2 ====
First round
3	(Thailand) D Puavaranukroh (Thailand) S Taerattanachai	21	19	15
(Japan) H Midorikawa (Japan) N Saito	12	21	21
A1	(Sri Lanka) C Dias (Sri Lanka) N Gunasekara	8	12
(Indonesia) R Rivaldy (Indonesia) P H Mentari	21	21
8	(Malaysia) Goh S H (Malaysia) S J Lai	15	22	21
(Chinese Taipei) Ye H-w (Chinese Taipei) Lee C-h	21	20	15
(Hong Kong) Lee C H (Hong Kong) Ng T Y	21	19	19
(China) Cheng X (China) Chen FH	18	21	21

Second round
(Japan) H Midorikawa (Japan) N Saito	12	21	13
(Indonesia) R Rivaldy (Indonesia) P H Mentari	21	16	21
8	(Malaysia) Goh S H (Malaysia) S J Lai	12	22	21
(China) Cheng X (China) Chen FH	21	20	15

Quarter final
(Indonesia) R Rivaldy (Indonesia) P H Mentari	17	21	19
8	(Malaysia) Goh S H (Malaysia) S J Lai	21	15	21

=== Bottom half ===
==== Section 3 ====
First round
(Chinese Taipei) Yang P-hs (Chinese Taipei) Hu L-f	19	17
(Thailand) S Jomkoh (Thailand) S Paewsampran	21	21
(Indonesia) D Ferdinansyah (Indonesia) G E Widjaja	21	21
6	(China) Feng YZ (China) Huang DP	18	14
C1	(India) R Kapoor (India) N S Reddy	21	21
(Malaysia) Chan P S (Malaysia) Cheah Y S	12	16
(Japan) Y Kaneko (Japan) M Matsutomo	18	15
4	(South Korea) Seo S-j (South Korea) Chae Y-j	21	21

Second round
(Thailand) S Jomkoh (Thailand) S Paewsampran	18	21	20
(Indonesia) D Ferdinansyah (Indonesia) G E Widjaja	21	17	22
C1	(India) R Kapoor (India) N S Reddy	w	/	o
4	(South Korea) Seo S-j (South Korea) Chae Y-j

Quarter final
(Indonesia) D Ferdinansyah (Indonesia) G E Widjaja	21	19	21
C1	(India) R Kapoor (India) N S Reddy	18	21	15

==== Section 4 ====
First round
(Thailand) R Oupthong (Thailand) J Sudjaipraparat	21	21
B1	(Vietnam) Phạm V H (Vietnam) Thân V A	11	6
(China) Jiang ZB (China) Wei YX	21	21
5	(Malaysia) Tan K M (Malaysia) Lai P J	17	13
(Chinese Taipei) Chang K-c (Chinese Taipei) Lee C-c	18	21	11
(Indonesia) R N Kusharjanto (Indonesia) L A Kusumawati	21	15	6^{r}
(Hong Kong) Tang C M (Hong Kong) Tse Y S	16	17
PFQ	(India) B. S Reddy (India) A Ponnappa	21	21

Second round
(Thailand) R Oupthong (Thailand) J Sudjaipraparat	13	8
(China) Jiang ZB (China) Wei YX	21	21
(Chinese Taipei) Chang K-c (Chinese Taipei) Lee C-c	21	21
PFQ	(India) B. S Reddy (India) A Ponnappa	15	17

Quarter final
(China) Jiang ZB (China) Wei YX	21	18	21
(Chinese Taipei) Chang K-c (Chinese Taipei) Lee C-c	17	21	17

== Players ==
Nation	MS	WS	MD	WD	XD	Total	Number of players
Bahrain	1	–	–	–	–	1	1
Bangladesh	–	–	1	–	–	1	2
Brunei	1	–	–	–	–	1	1
China	3	4	4	3	4	18	29
Chinese Taipei	2	3	4	4	4	17	23
Timor-Leste	1	–	–	–	–	1	1
Hong Kong	2	1	1	4	2	10	16
India	3	3	4	4	4	18	30
Indonesia	3	3	4	4	4	18	30
Iran	1	1	–	1	–	3	3
Iraq	1	–	–	–	–	1	1
Japan	3	4	4	4	3	18	29
Jordan	1	–	–	–	–	1	1
Kazakhstan	1	1	–	–	–	2	2
Malaysia	2	2	4	2	4	14	23
Maldives	1	1	1	1	1	5	5
Mongolia	1	–	–	–	–	1	1
Myanmar	1	1	–	–	–	2	2
Nepal	1	1	–	–	1	3	2
Philippines	1	1	1	1	1	5	6
Saudi Arabia	1	–	1	–	–	2	3
Singapore	1	1	1	1	1	5	8
South Korea	1	3	3	4	2	13	19
Sri Lanka	1	1	–	–	1	3	4
Syria	1	–	–	–	–	1	1
Thailand	2	3	3	3	4	15	23
United Arab Emirates (H)	2	2	2	2	2	10	16
Vietnam	1	1	1	1	1	5	8
Total (28 nations)	40	38	38	39	39	194	290

== Performance by nation ==
Nation	GS	R32	R16	QF	SF	F	W	Total
China	—	18	16	9	4	2	1	18
Chinese Taipei	1	17	7	3	2	1	1	17
India	4	15	7	4	1	1	1	18
Indonesia	—	18	12	9	2	1	1	18
Japan	—	18	11	6	5	1	1	18
South Korea	—	13	8	3	2	2		13
Malaysia	1	14	5	2	2	1		14
Singapore	1	2	2	1	1	1		5
Thailand	3	14	7	2	1			15
Hong Kong	4	8	3	1				10
Vietnam	3	4	1					5
Jordan	—	1	1					1
Philippines	4	3						5
Sri Lanka	2	3						3
United Arab Emirates	10	2						10
Kazakhstan	1	2						2
Myanmar	1	2						2
Bahrain	—	1						1
Maldives	5	1						5
Nepal	3	1						3
Iran	3							3
Saudi Arabia	2							2
Bangladesh	1							1
Brunei	1							1
Timor-Leste	1							1
Iraq	1							1
Mongolia	1							1
Syria	1							1
Total	54	160	80	40	20	10	5	194
