= Badminton at the 2007 Arab Games =

Badminton at the 2007 Pan Arab Games
- Venue: Cairo Stadium Indoor Halls Complex
- Dates: 19–24 November
- Nations: 8

Badminton was contested at the 2007 Pan Arab Games in Cairo Stadium Indoor Halls Complex, Cairo, Egypt from November 19 to November 24, 2007.

Syria topped the medal table, winning four gold medals, a silver and a bronze.

== Medal table ==
* Host nation (Egypt)

Rank	NOC	Gold	Silver	Bronze	Total
1	Syria (SYR)	4	1	1	6
2	Algeria (ALG)	3	2	0	5
3	Egypt (EGY)*	0	3	5	8
4	Jordan (JOR)	0	1	2	3
5	Bahrain (BRN)	0	0	2	2
5	Iraq (IRQ)	0	0	2	2
7	Sudan (SUD)	0	0	1	1
Totals (7 entries)		7	7	13	27

=== Medalists ===
Event	Gold	Silver	Bronze
Men's singles	Algeria; Nabil Lasmari	Algeria; Karim Rezig	Egypt; Abdelrahman Kashkal
Men's singles	Algeria; Nabil Lasmari	Algeria; Karim Rezig	Bahrain; Jaffar Ibrahim
Men's doubles	Algeria; Nabil Lasmari; Karim Rezig	Egypt; Kareem Shedeed; Abdelrahman Kashkal	Bahrain; Jaffar Ibrahim; Hamid Ibrahim
Men's doubles	Algeria; Nabil Lasmari; Karim Rezig	Egypt; Kareem Shedeed; Abdelrahman Kashkal	Syria; Tareq Shalhoum; Bassel Al-Durrah
Men's team	Algeria; Nabil Lasmari; Karim Rezig; Salim Belmahi; Yacoub Benadda	Syria; Tareq Shalhoum; Bassel Al-Durrah; Nawras Abdul Wahid; Hayel Kareem	Jordan; Rami Al-Sheikh; Mohd Naser Mansour Nayef; Tariq Mansour Elfawair; Muntaser Elnabani
Men's team	Algeria; Nabil Lasmari; Karim Rezig; Salim Belmahi; Yacoub Benadda	Syria; Tareq Shalhoum; Bassel Al-Durrah; Nawras Abdul Wahid; Hayel Kareem	Egypt; Abdelrahman Kashkal; Kareem Shedeed; Shehab Yehia; Mohamed El-Sayad; Ahmed Salah
Women's singles	Syria; Hadil Kareem	Egypt; Hadia Hosny	Egypt; Dina Nagy
Women's singles	Syria; Hadil Kareem	Egypt; Hadia Hosny	Syria; Eva Katrib
Women's doubles	Syria; Hadil Karim; Bushra Muhawesh	Jordan; Razane Kaled Alkhalife; Dima Issam Alardah	Egypt; Alaa Youssef; Hadia Hosny
Women's doubles	Syria; Hadil Karim; Bushra Muhawesh	Jordan; Razane Kaled Alkhalife; Dima Issam Alardah	Iraq; Etihad Kamel; Ola Sabri
Women's team	Syria; Hadil Kareem; Eva Katrib; Bushra Muhawesh	Egypt; Hadia Hosny; Dina Nagy; Alaa Youssef; Noran Hassan Elbanna; Sandy Nagy	Sudan; Susan Abdullah; Munira Abkar; Nehany Ukasha; Nahid Ramadan
Women's team	Syria; Hadil Kareem; Eva Katrib; Bushra Muhawesh	Egypt; Hadia Hosny; Dina Nagy; Alaa Youssef; Noran Hassan Elbanna; Sandy Nagy	Jordan; Razane Kaled Alkhalife; Dima Issam Alardah; Alia Munir Khawaja; Mazahreh Leina Fehmi
Mixed doubles	Syria; Bassel Al-Durrah; Hadil Kareem	Algeria; Karim Rezig; Malika Menaceri	Egypt; Kareem Shedeed; Alaa Youssef
Mixed doubles	Syria; Bassel Al-Durrah; Hadil Kareem	Algeria; Karim Rezig; Malika Menaceri	Iraq; Saleh Mehdi; Etihad Kamel

== Individual results ==
=== Men's singles ===
==== Finals ====
Semi-finals
(Algeria) Karim Rezig	21	21
(Bahrain) Jaffar Ibrahim	8	14
(Algeria) Nabil Lasmari	21	21
(Egypt) Abdelrahman Kashkal	6	7

Final
(Algeria) Karim Rezig	17	16
(Algeria) Nabil Lasmari	21	21

==== Section 1 ====
First round
(Algeria) Karim Rezig	21	21
(Iraq) Abbas Salam	11	8
(Bahrain) Mubarak Mohammed
(Egypt) Ahmed Salah	w	/	o

Second round
(Syria) Tareq Shalhoum	17	15
(Algeria) Karim Rezig	21	21
(Egypt) Shehab Yehia	21	21
(Egypt) Ahmed Salah	18	13

Quarter-finals
(Algeria) Karim Rezig	21	21
(Egypt) Shehab Yehia	12	11

==== Section 2 ====
First round
(Iraq) Saleh Mehdi	21	21	21
(Syria) Hayel Kareem	23	13	16
(Sudan) Abdelrahman Mohamed	5	10
(Jordan) Rami Al-Sheikh	21	21
(Algeria) Yacoub Benadda	1	10
(Bahrain) Jaffar Ibrahim	21	21
(Sudan) Amin Saif Eldin	9	11
(Egypt) Kareem Shedeed	21	21

Second round
(Iraq) Saleh Mehdi	16	20
(Jordan) Rami Al-Sheikh	21	22
(Bahrain) Jaffar Ibrahim	21	26
(Egypt) Kareem Shedeed	15	24

Quarter-finals
(Jordan) Rami Al-Sheikh	7	26
(Bahrain) Jaffar Ibrahim	21	28

==== Section 3 ====
First round
(Syria) Nawras Abdul Wahid	21	21
(Egypt) Mohamed El-Sayad	17	10
(Jordan) Muntaser Elnabani	8	12
(Algeria) Nabil Lasmari	21	21
(Jordan) Mohd Naser Mansour Nayef	21	21
(Mauritania) Sayed Ibrahim	4	4

Second round
(Syria) Nawras Abdul Wahid	15	5
(Algeria) Nabil Lasmari	21	21
(Jordan) Mohd Naser Mansour Nayef	21	21
(Sudan) Haitham Hassan Awad	5	15

Quarter-finals
(Algeria) Nabil Lasmari	21	21
(Jordan) Mohd Naser Mansour Nayef	15	16

==== Section 4 ====
First round
(Egypt) Abdelrahman Kashkal	21	21
(Sudan) Fath Alrahman Ahmed	4	5
(Bahrain) Hamid Ibrahim	21	21
(Algeria) Salim Belmahi	11	13

Second round
(Egypt) Abdelrahman Kashkal	21	21
(Iraq) Jabar Alikazem	16	11
(Bahrain) Hamid Ibrahim	25	10	15
(Jordan) Tariq Mansour Elfawair	23	21	21

Quarter-finals
(Egypt) Abdelrahman Kashkal	21	21
(Jordan) Tariq Mansour Elfawair	17	17

=== Women's singles ===
==== Finals ====
Semi-finals
(Syria) Hadil Kareem	21	21
(Egypt) Dina Nagy	5	9
(Egypt) Hadia Hosny	21	21
(Syria) Eva Katrib	9	17

Final
(Syria) Hadil Kareem	21	21
(Egypt) Hadia Hosny	15	12

==== Section 1 ====
First round
(Iraq) Ann Khalid
(Algeria) Cherifi Hakima

Second round
(Syria) Hadil Kareem
(Egypt) Sandy Nagy
(Sudan) Munira Abkar
(Algeria) Cherifi Hakima

Quarter-finals
(Syria) Hadil Kareem
(Algeria) Cherifi Hakima

==== Section 2 ====
First round
(Sudan) Susan Abdullah
(Iraq) Ola Sabri
(Iraq) Esra Nasser
(Egypt) Dina Nagy

Second round
(Egypt) Noran Hassan Elbanna
(Sudan) Susan Abdullah
(Jordan) Alia Munir Khawaja
(Egypt) Dina Nagy

Quarter-finals
(Egypt) Noran Hassan Elbanna
(Egypt) Dina Nagy

==== Section 3 ====
First round
(Egypt) Hadia Hosny
(Syria) Bushra Muhawesh
(Sudan) Nehany Ukasha
(Iraq) Etihad Kamel

Second round
(Egypt) Hadia Hosny
(Algeria) Malika Menaceri
(Iraq) Etihad Kamel
(Sudan) Nahid Ramadan

Quarter-finals
(Egypt) Hadia Hosny
(Iraq) Etihad Kamel

==== Section 4 ====
First round
(Jordan) Mazahreh Leina Fehmi
(Syria) Eva Katrib
(Iraq) Hadeel Hany
(Jordan) Razane Kaled Alkhalife

Second round
(Syria) Eva Katrib
(Jordan) Dima Issam Alardah
(Jordan) Razane Kaled Alkhalife
(Egypt) Alaa Youssef

Quarter-finals
(Syria) Eva Katrib
(Egypt) Alaa Youssef

=== Men's doubles ===
Quarterfinals
(Syria) Tareq Shalhoum (Syria) Bassel Al-Durrah	21	21
(Sudan) Haitham Hassan Awad (Sudan) Amin Saif Eldin	13	11
(Bahrain) Jaffar Ibrahim (Bahrain) Hamid Ibrahim	21	19	21
(Iraq) Abbas Salam (Iraq) Jabar Alikazem	17	21	17
(Egypt) Kareem Shedeed (Egypt) Abdelrahman Kashkal	21	18	24
(Jordan) Rami Al-Sheikh (Jordan) Tariq Mansour Elfawair	19	21	22

Semifinals
(Algeria) Nabil Lasmari (Algeria) Karim Rezig	18	21	21
(Syria) Tareq Shalhoum (Syria) Bassel Al-Durrah	21	15	15
(Bahrain) Jaffar Ibrahim (Bahrain) Hamid Ibrahim	18	30	16
(Egypt) Kareem Shedeed (Egypt) Abdelrahman Kashkal	21	29	21

Finals
(Algeria) Nabil Lasmari (Algeria) Karim Rezig	21	21
(Egypt) Kareem Shedeed (Egypt) Abdelrahman Kashkal	15	17

=== Women's doubles ===
Quarterfinals
(Egypt) Alaa Youssef (Egypt) Hadia Hosny	21	21
(Algeria) Malika Menaceri (Algeria) Cherifi Hakima	11	9
(Iraq) Etihad Kamel (Iraq) Ola Sabri	21	14	21
(Sudan) Susan Abdullah (Sudan) Munira Abkar	16	21	18

Semifinals
(Syria) Hadil Kareem (Syria) Bushra Muhawesh	17	21	21
(Egypt) Alaa Youssef (Egypt) Hadia Hosny	21	13	11
(Iraq) Etihad Kamel (Iraq) Ola Sabri	8	3
(Jordan) Razane Kaled Alkhalife (Jordan) Dima Issam Alardah	21	21

Finals
(Syria) Hadil Kareem (Syria) Bushra Muhawesh	21	22
(Jordan) Razane Kaled Alkhalife (Jordan) Dima Issam Alardah	13	20

=== Mixed doubles ===
Quarterfinals
(Egypt) Kareem Shedeed (Egypt) Alaa Youssef	8	21	21
(Jordan) Rami Al-Sheikh (Jordan) Razane Kaled Alkhalife	21	17	19
(Sudan) Amin Saif Eldin (Sudan) Susan Abdullah	21	13	12
(Iraq) Saleh Mehdi (Iraq) Etihad Kamel	17	21	21

Semifinals
(Syria) Bassel Al-Durrah (Syria) Hadil Kareem	15	21	21
(Egypt) Kareem Shedeed (Egypt) Alaa Youssef	21	14	12
(Iraq) Saleh Mehdi (Iraq) Etihad Kamel	7	16
(Algeria) Karim Rezig (Algeria) Malika Menaceri	21	21

Finals
(Syria) Bassel Al-Durrah (Syria) Hadil Kareem	21	21
(Algeria) Karim Rezig (Algeria) Malika Menaceri	14	12

== Men's team ==
=== Final ranking ===
Pos	Team	Final result
1st place, gold medalist(s)	Algeria	Champions
2nd place, silver medalist(s)	Syria	Runners-up
3rd place, bronze medalist(s)	Jordan	Group semi runner-up
3rd place, bronze medalist(s)	Egypt	Group semi runner-up
5	Bahrain	5th in group
6	Sudan	6th in group
7	Iraq	7th in group

=== Matches ===
Algeria
3
Cairo Stadium Indoor Halls Complex
19 November 2007

Sudan
0

			1	2	3
1	(Algeria) (Sudan)	Karim Rezig; Amin Saif Eldin	21; 5	21; 7
2	(Algeria) (Sudan)	Yacoub Benadda / Karim Rezig; Fath Alrahman Ahmed / Haitham Hassan Awad	21; 15	21; 9
3	(Algeria) (Sudan)	Nourine Salim; Fath Alrahman Ahmed				w/o

Egypt
3
Cairo Stadium Indoor Halls Complex
19 November 2007

Iraq
0

			1	2	3
1	(Egypt) (Iraq)	Abdelrahman Kashkal; Jabar Alikazem	21; 4	21; 4
2	(Egypt) (Iraq)	Mahmoud El-Sayad / Kareem Shedeed; Saleh Mehdi / Abbas Salam	21; 19	21; 17
3	(Egypt) (Iraq)	Shehab Yehia; Saleh Mehdi	21; 16	21; 17

Bahrain
1
Cairo Stadium Indoor Halls Complex
19 November 2007

Jordan
2

			1	2	3
1	(Bahrain) (Jordan)	Jaffar Ibrahim; Muntaser Elnabani	21; 11	21; 13
2	(Bahrain) (Jordan)	Hamid Ibrahim / Jaffar Ibrahim; Rami Al-Sheikh / Tariq Mansour Elfawair	9; 15			retired
3	(Bahrain) (Jordan)	Mubarak Mohammed; Tariq Mansour Elfawair	13; 21	12; 21

Jordan
2
Cairo Stadium Indoor Halls Complex
21 November 2007

Iraq
1

			1	2	3
1	(Jordan) (Iraq)	Muntaser Elnabani; Saleh Mehdi	17; 21	17; 21
2	(Jordan) (Iraq)	Rami Al-Sheikh / Tariq Mansour Elfawair; Jabar Alikazem / Abbas Salam	23; 25	21; 13	21; 19
3	(Jordan) (Iraq)	Rami Al-Sheikh; Abbas Salam	21; 19	21; 10

Algeria
2
Cairo Stadium Indoor Halls Complex
21 November 2007

Egypt
1

			1	2	3
1	(Algeria) (Egypt)	Nabil Lasmari; Shehab Yehia	21; 11	21; 18
2	(Algeria) (Egypt)	Yacoub Benadda / Nourine Salim; Kareem Shedeed / Mahmoud El-Sayad	8; 21	9; 21
3	(Algeria) (Egypt)	Karim Rezig; Mahmoud El-Sayad

Bahrain
2
Cairo Stadium Indoor Halls Complex
21 November 2007

Sudan
1

			1	2	3
1	(Bahrain) (Sudan)	Jaffar Ibrahim; Haitham Hassan Awad	21; 10	21; 2
2	(Bahrain) (Sudan)	Hamid Ibrahim / Jaffar Ibrahim; Haitham Hassan Awad / Fath Alrahman Ahmed	21; 3	21; 9
3	(Bahrain) (Sudan)	Mubarak Mohammed; Amin Saif Eldin	16; 21	21; 18	21; 23

Egypt
3
Cairo Stadium Indoor Halls Complex
21 November 2007

Sudan
0

			1	2	3
1	(Egypt) (Sudan)	Karim Shedeed; Haitham Hassan Awad	21; 7	21; 8
2	(Egypt) (Sudan)	Mahmoud El-Sayad / Shehab Yehia; Haitham Hassan Awad / Fath Alrahman Ahmed	21; 8	21; 11
3	(Egypt) (Sudan)	Shehab Yehia; Amin Saif Eldin	21; 11	21; 9

Bahrain
3
Cairo Stadium Indoor Halls Complex
21 November 2007

Iraq
0

			1	2	3
1	(Bahrain) (Iraq)	Mubarak Mohammed; Saleh Mehdi				w/o
2	(Bahrain) (Iraq)	Hamid Ibrahim / Jaffar Ibrahim; Jabar Alikazem / Abbas Salam	21; 14	21; 16
3	(Bahrain) (Iraq)	Jaffar Ibrahim; Abbas Salam	21; 14	21; 16

Syria
2
Cairo Stadium Indoor Halls Complex
21 November 2007

Jordan
1

			1	2	3
1	(Syria) (Jordan)	Nawras Abdul Wahid; Muntaser Elnabani	21; 12	21; 15
2	(Syria) (Jordan)	Tareq Shalhoum / Bassel Al-Durrah; Rami Al-Sheikh / Tariq Mansour Elfawair	21; 11	21; 18
3	(Syria) (Jordan)	Tareq Shalhoum; Tariq Mansour Elfawair	14; 21			retired

Algeria
3
Cairo Stadium Indoor Halls Complex
21 November 2007

Syria
0

			1	2	3
1	(Algeria) (Syria)	Nabil Lasmari; Nawras Abdul Wahid	21; 8	21; 10
2	(Algeria) (Syria)	Nabil Lasmari / Karim Rezig; Tareq Shalhoum / Bassel Al-Durrah	23; 21	15; 21	21; 11
3	(Algeria) (Syria)	Yacoub Benadda; Tareq Shalhoum				w/o

== Women's team ==
=== Final ranking ===
Pos	Team	Final result
1st place, gold medalist(s)	Syria	Champions
2nd place, silver medalist(s)	Egypt	Runners-up
3rd place, bronze medalist(s)	Sudan	Group semi runner-up
3rd place, bronze medalist(s)	Jordan	Group semi runner-up
5	Iraq	5th in group
6	Algeria	6th in group

=== Matches ===
Egypt
3
Cairo Stadium Indoor Halls Complex
19 November 2007

Iraq
0

			1	2	3
1	(Egypt) (Iraq)	Sandy Nagy; Ola Sabri	21; 7	21; 7
2	(Egypt) (Iraq)	Noran Hassan Elbanna / Dina Nagy; Ola Sabri / Abbas Salam	21; 7	21; 9
3	(Egypt) (Iraq)	Alaa Youssef; Hadeel Hany				w/o

Syria
3
Cairo Stadium Indoor Halls Complex
21 November 2007

Sudan
0

			1	2	3
1	(Syria) (Sudan)	Hadil Kareem; Susan Abdullah	21; 11	21; 7
2	(Syria) (Sudan)	Hadil Kareem / Eva Katrib; Munira Abkar / Nahid Ramadan	21; 7	9; 6		retired
3	(Syria) (Sudan)	Bushra Muhawesh; Nehany Ukasha	21; 16	5; 5		retired

Jordan
3
Cairo Stadium Indoor Halls Complex
19 November 2007

Algeria
0

			1	2	3
1	(Jordan) (Algeria)	Razane Kaled Alkhalife; Malika Menaceri	21; 14	21; 13
2	(Jordan) (Algeria)	Dima Issam Alardah / Razane Kaled Alkhalife; Cherifi Hakima / Malika Menaceri	18; 21	22; 20		retired
3	(Jordan) (Algeria)	Mazahreh Leina Fehmi; Cherifi Hakima				w/o

Iraq
1
Cairo Stadium Indoor Halls Complex
21 November 2007

Sudan
2

			1	2	3
1	(Iraq) (Sudan)	Etihad Kamel; Susan Abdullah	21; 19	21; 17
2	(Iraq) (Sudan)	Etihad Kamel / Ola Sabri; Munira Abkar / Susan Abdullah	18; 21	14; 21
3	(Iraq) (Sudan)	Esra Nasser; Nahid Ramadan				w/o

Syria
3
Cairo Stadium Indoor Halls Complex
21 November 2007

Egypt
0

			1	2	3
1	(Syria) (Egypt)	Eva Katrib; Alaa Youssef	21; 15	21; 12
2	(Syria) (Egypt)	Hadil Kareem / Bushra Muhawesh; Alaa Youssef / Hadia Hosny	21; 13	21; 16
3	(Syria) (Egypt)	Hadil Kareem; Noran Hassan Elbanna	21; 14	21; 13

Jordan
3
Cairo Stadium Indoor Halls Complex
21 November 2007

Iraq
0

			1	2	3
1	(Jordan) (Iraq)	Razane Kaled Alkhalife; Ola Sabri				w/o
2	(Jordan) (Iraq)	Etihad Kamel / Ola Sabri; Etihad Kamel / Ola Sabri	21; 9	21; 15
3	(Jordan) (Iraq)	Mazahreh Leina Fehmi; Esra Nasser				w/o

== Participating nations ==
A total of 8 nations competed in badminton at the 2007 Pan Arab Games:

- Algeria
- Bahrain
- Egypt
- Iraq
- Jordan
- Mauritania
- Sudan
- Syria

== Participants ==
Country	Men's	Women's	Total athletes
Algeria (ALG)	1. Nabil Lasmari; 2. Karim Rezig; 3. Salim Belmahi; 4. Yacoub Benadda	1. Malika Menaceri; 2. Cherifi Hakima	6
Bahrain (BHR)	1. Jaffar Ibrahim; 2. Hamid Ibrahim; 3. Mubarak Mohammed		3
Egypt (EGY)	1. Abdelrahman Kashkal; 2. Kareem Shedeed; 3. Ahmed Salah; 4. Shehab Yehia; 5. Mohamed El-Sayad	1. Hadia Hosny; 2. Dina Nagy; 3. Sandy Nagy; 4. Alaa Youssef; 5. Noran Hassan Elbanna	10
Iraq (IRQ)	1. Jabar Alikazem; 2. Saleh Mehdi; 3. Abbas Salam	1. Etihad Kamel; 2. Ola Sabri; 3. Hadeel Hany; 4. Esra Nasser; 5. Ann Khalid	8
Jordan (JOR)	1. Rami Al-Sheikh; 2. Mohd Naser Mansour Nayef; 3. Tariq Mansour Elfawair; 4. Muntaser Elnabani	1. Razane Kaled Alkhalife; 2. Dima Issam Alardah; 3. Alia Munir Khawaja; 4. Mazahreh Leina Fehmi	8
Mauritania (MTN)	1. Sayed Ibrahim		1
Sudan (SUD)	1. Haitham Hassan Awad; 2. Fath Alrahman Ahmed; 3. Amin Saif Eldin; 4. Abdelrahman Mohamed	1. Susan Abdullah; 2. Munira Abkar; 3. Nahid Ramadan; 4. Nehany Ukasha	8
Syria (SYR)	1. Tareq Shalhoum; 2. Bassel Al-Durrah; 3. Nawras Abdul Wahid; 4. Hayel Kareem	1. Hadil Kareem; 2. Eva Katrib; 3. Bushra Muhawesh	7
