= Sudan national badminton team =

National badminton team representing Sudan

Sudan
- Association: Sudan Badminton Federation (SBF)
- Confederation: BCA (Africa)
- President: Hanadi Alsiddig Yagoub

BWF ranking
- Current ranking: Unranked (2 April 2024)
- Highest ranking: 131 (4 October 2018)

African Mixed Team Championships
- Appearances: 1 (first in 2006)
- Best result: Group stage

The Sudan national badminton team (Arabic: فريق كرة الريشة الوطني لجمهورية السودان) represents Sudan in international badminton team competitions. It is controlled by the Sudan Badminton Federation, the national governing body for Sudanese badminton. The Sudanese team is affiliated with the Sudan Olympic Committee and the Badminton Confederation of Africa.

== History ==
Badminton has been played in Sudan since 1999. The sport was then played by a small Malaysian diaspora in Sudan. In 2003 the Sudan Badminton Federation was established and the national team was formed. The national association sent its first few players for the 2007 Pan Arab Games.

Badminton has struggled to gain popularity in Sudan in the 2010s due to the lack of competition. In 2020, the Republic Badminton Championship were in El-Obeid to increase competition in Sudanese badminton. Intercity badminton clubs in Sudan including Al-Abyad and Al-Jarif Al-Khartoum competed in the championships.

=== Men's team ===
The Sudanese men's debuted in the 2007 Pan Arab Games. The team lost 3–0 to Algeria and Egypt in the round robin event. They then lost 2–1 to Bahrain and finished in 6th place.

=== Women's team ===
The Sudanese women's team first competed in the 2007 Pan Arab Games. The team lost 3–0 to Syria in their first match. They then achieved a surprising win when they defeated the Iraqi team 2–1 to earn themselves a bronze medal finish. Doubles pair Munira Abkar and Susan Abdullah managed to turn the tie around when they defeated Etihad Kamel and Ola Sabri 21–18, 21–14.

== Competitive record ==
=== Thomas Cup ===
Year	Round	Pos
1949 to 1955	Part of the United Kingdom	
1952	Part of the United Kingdom	
1955	Part of the United Kingdom	
1958 to 2024	Did not enter	
2026	To be determined	
2028	To be determined	
2030	To be determined	

=== Uber Cup ===
Year	Round	Pos
1957 to 2024	Did not enter	
2026	To be determined	
2028	To be determined	
2030	To be determined	

=== Sudirman Cup ===
Year	Round	Pos
1989 to 2023	Did not enter	
2025	To be determined	
2027	To be determined	
2029	To be determined	

=== African Games ===
==== Mixed team ====
Year	Round	Pos
2003	Did not enter	
2007	Did not enter	
2011	Did not enter	
2015	Did not enter	
2019	Did not enter	
2027	To be determined	

=== African Team Championships ===
==== Men's team ====
Year	Round	Pos
1979 to 2024	Did not enter	
2026	To be determined	
2028	To be determined	
2030	To be determined	

==== Women's team ====
Year	Round	Pos
1979 to 2024	Did not enter	
2026	To be determined	
2028	To be determined	
2030	To be determined	

==== Mixed team ====
Year	Round	Pos
1980 to 2004	Did not enter	
2006	Group stage	13th
2007	Did not enter	
2009	Did not enter	
2011	Did not enter	
2013	Did not enter	
2014	Did not enter	
2017	Did not enter	
2019	Did not enter	
2021	Did not enter	
2023	Did not enter	
2025	To be determined	
2027	To be determined	
2029	To be determined	

=== Arab Games ===
==== Men's team ====
Year	Round	Pos
1999	Did not enter	
2004	Did not enter	
2007	Sixth place	6th

==== Women's team ====
Year	Round	Pos
1999	Did not enter	
2004	Did not enter	
2007	3rd / 4th in group	4th

=== Arab Team Championships ===
==== Men's team ====
Year	Round	Pos
1996	Did not enter	
1998	Did not enter	
2000	Did not enter	
2002	Did not enter	
2004	Sixth place	6th
2009	Group stage	7th
2011	Did not enter	
2017	Sixth place	6th

==== Women's team ====
Year	Round	Pos
1996	Did not enter	
1998	Did not enter	
2000	Did not enter	
2002	Did not enter	
2004	Fourth place	4th
2009	Group stage	6th
2011	Did not enter	
2017	Third place	3rd

**Red border color indicates tournament was held on home soil.

== Junior competitive record ==
=== Suhandinata Cup ===
Year	Round	Pos
2000 to 2024	Did not enter	
2025	To be determined	

=== African Youth Games ===
==== Men's team ====
Year	Round	Pos
2018	Did not enter	

==== Women's team ====
Year	Round	Pos
2018	Did not enter	

==== Mixed team ====
Year	Round	Pos
2014	Did not enter	

=== African Junior Team Championships ===
==== Mixed team ====
Year	Round	Pos
1979 to 2007	Did not enter	
2009	Group stage	8th
2011	Did not enter	
2013	Did not enter	
2016	Did not enter	
2021	Did not enter	
2022	Did not enter	
2024	To be determined	

=== Arab Junior Team Championships ===
==== Boys' team ====
Year	Round	Pos
2003	Fifth place	5th
2005	Group stage	7th
2007	Group stage	7th
2009	Did not enter	
2016	Did not enter	

==== Girls' team ====
Year	Round	Pos
2003	Fifth place	5th
2005	Group stage	7th
2007	Group stage	7th
2009	Did not enter	
2016	Did not enter	

**Red border color indicates tournament was held on home soil.

== Players ==
=== Current squad ===
As of 2 January 2024

==== Men's team ====
Name	DoB/Age	Ranking of event		
Name	DoB/Age	MS	MD	XD
Osman Mohamedkhair	29 November 1991 (age 33)	–	–	–
Haitham Hassan Awad	1989 (age 35–36)	–	–	–

==== Women's team ====
Name	DoB/Age	Ranking of event		
Name	DoB/Age	WS	WD	XD
Rayan Ragab	1 January 1993 (age 32)	–	–	–
Munira Abkar	1988 (age 36–37)	–	–	–

=== Previous squads ===
==== Pan Arab Games ====
- Men's team: 2007
- Women's team: 2007
