= Badminton at the 1999 Arab Games =

- Venue: Al-Yarmouk Hall
- Location: Amman, Jordan
- Dates: 19–25 August

Badminton made its debut at the 1999 Arab Games. Seven events were contested in the tournament. The tournament was held at the Al-Yarmouk Hall in Amman, Jordan from August 19 to August 25, 1999.

Syria topped the medal table, winning a total of six golds, two silvers and a bronze. Hosts Jordan placed second on the medal table, winning a gold, three silvers and five bronze medals in the tournament. Egypt placed third on the medal table with two silvers and two bronze medals.

== Medal table ==
* Host nation (Jordan)

Rank	NOC	Gold	Silver	Bronze	Total
1	Syria (SYR)	6	2	1	9
2	Jordan (JOR)*	1	3	5	9
3	Egypt (EGY)	0	2	2	4
4	Bahrain (BHR)	0	0	4	4
5	Iraq (IRQ)	0	0	2	2
Totals (5 entries)		7	7	14	28

=== Medalists ===
Event	Gold	Silver	Bronze
Men's singles	Syria; Talal Derki	Syria; Bassel Al-Durrah	Jordan; Muntaser Elnabani
Men's singles	Syria; Talal Derki	Syria; Bassel Al-Durrah	Jordan; Tariq Mansour Elfawair
Men's doubles	Syria; Bassel Al-Durrah; Talal Derki	Egypt; Yehya Aldel Kader; Tamar Raafat	Jordan; Tariq Mansour Elfawair; Wael Tlilan
Men's doubles	Syria; Bassel Al-Durrah; Talal Derki	Egypt; Yehya Aldel Kader; Tamar Raafat	Iraq; Saleh Mehdi; Jabar Alikazem
Men's team	Syria; Talal Derki; Bassel Al-Durrah; Nawras Abdul Wahid; Hayel Kareem	Jordan; Tariq Mansour Elfawair; Rami Al-Sheikh; Wael Tlilan; Muntaser Elnabani	Bahrain; Hesham Al-Abbasi; Saleh Mohammed; Jaffer Sayede; Mubarak Mohammed
Men's team	Syria; Talal Derki; Bassel Al-Durrah; Nawras Abdul Wahid; Hayel Kareem	Jordan; Tariq Mansour Elfawair; Rami Al-Sheikh; Wael Tlilan; Muntaser Elnabani	Egypt; Yehya Aldel Kader; Tamar Raafat; Kareem Shedeed; Karim Shalam
Women's singles	Syria; Eva Katrib	Syria; Rasha Al-Hassan	Jordan; Dina Abu Zaid
Women's singles	Syria; Eva Katrib	Syria; Rasha Al-Hassan	Jordan; Ghada Al-Afghani
Women's doubles	Syria; Eva Katrib; Rasha Al-Hassan	Jordan; Dina Abu Zaid; Lina Al-Rashdan	Egypt; Shaima Thabet; Sanaa Thabet
Women's doubles	Syria; Eva Katrib; Rasha Al-Hassan	Jordan; Dina Abu Zaid; Lina Al-Rashdan	Bahrain; Samira Asiri; Suad Yassin
Women's team	Syria; Hadil Kareem; Eva Katrib; Nabela Fatal; Rasha Al-Hassan	Jordan; Dina Abu Zaid; Lina Al-Rashdan; Najwa Al-Turk; Ghada Al-Afghani	Bahrain; Samia Al-Qattan; Samira Asiri; Suad Yassin
Women's team	Syria; Hadil Kareem; Eva Katrib; Nabela Fatal; Rasha Al-Hassan	Jordan; Dina Abu Zaid; Lina Al-Rashdan; Najwa Al-Turk; Ghada Al-Afghani	Iraq; Etihad Kamel; Ola Sabri; Hadeel Hany; Esra Nasser
Mixed doubles	Jordan; Tariq Mansour Elfawair; Najwa Al-Turk	Egypt; Kareem Shedeed; Alaa Youssef	Syria; Talal Derki; Eva Katrib
Mixed doubles	Jordan; Tariq Mansour Elfawair; Najwa Al-Turk	Egypt; Kareem Shedeed; Alaa Youssef	Bahrain; Hesham Al-Abbasi; Samia Al-Qattan

== Participating nations ==
A total of 6 nations competed in badminton at the 1999 Arab Games:

- Algeria
- Bahrain
- Egypt
- Iraq
- Jordan
- Syria
