= Iraq national badminton team =

National badminton team representing Iraq

Iraq
- Association: Iraq Badminton Federation (BFI)
- Confederation: BA (Asia)
- President: Haval Abdulaziz Muhammed

BWF ranking
- Current ranking: 121 (2 January 2024)
- Highest ranking: 86 (3 April 2015)

The Iraq national badminton team (Arabic: منتخب الريشة الوطني العراقي) represents Iraq in international badminton team competitions and is controlled by the Iraq Badminton Federation, the governing body for Iraqi badminton.

The team made its international team tournament debut in the 2009 Badminton Asia Junior Championships mixed team event. Iraq also competes in para-badminton. The national team competed in the Pan Arab Games and has won two bronze medals in doubles.

== History ==
Badminton was first introduced to Iraq in the 1950s by British soldiers. The Iraq Badminton Federation and the national team became affiliated with the National Olympic Committee of Iraq in 1987.

=== Men's team ===
The Iraqi men's team competed in the 2007 Pan Arab Games. The team lost all of their matches in the round robin tournament and finished in 7th place.

=== Women's team ===
The Iraqi women's team first competed in the 2007 Pan Arab Games along with the men's team. The team won against Algeria but lost 0−3 to Egypt, Sudan, Jordan and Syria. The team finished in 5th place on the overall standings.

== Competitive record ==
=== Pan Arab Games ===
==== Men's team ====
Year	Result
(Jordan) 1999	Group stage
(Algeria) 2004	Group stage
(Egypt) 2007	7th

==== Women's team ====
Year	Result
(Jordan) 1999	Group stage
(Algeria) 2004	Group stage
(Egypt) 2007	5th

== Junior competitive record ==
=== Asian Junior Team Championships ===
==== Mixed team ====
Year	Result
2009	Group stage

== Players ==
=== Current squad ===
As of 2 January 2024

==== Men's team ====
Name	DoB/Age	Ranking of event		
Name	DoB/Age	MS	MD	XD
Yousif Alhumairi	13 September 2003 (age 23)	694	-	-
Ali Muafaq Hadi Alqazzaz	27 October 1998 (age 28)	1561	717	-
Yousif Khudhur	24 March 2004 (age 22)	1561	717	-
Muntadher Nabeel	11 September 2002 (age 24)	1561	717	-

==== Women's team ====
Name	DoB/Age	Ranking of event		
Name	DoB/Age	WS	WD	XD
Hajir Haneer	14 October 2007 (age 19)	1035	589	-
Maryam Haneer	6 December 2003 (age 22)	1035	589	-
Iman Abdulrazaq	19 July 2008 (age 18)	-	-	-
Lobna Shakir	3 December 1987 (age 38)	835	-	-

=== Previous squads ===
==== Pan Arab Games ====
- Men's team: 2007
- Women's team: 2007
