= Egypt national badminton team =

National badminton team representing Egypt

Egypt
- Association: Egyptian Badminton Federation (EBF)
- Confederation: BCA (Africa)
- President: Ali Hassaballah

BWF ranking
- Current ranking: 22 (2 April 2024)
- Highest ranking: 18 (3 January 2023)

Sudirman Cup
- Appearances: 2 (first in 2021)
- Best result: Group stage

Uber Cup
- Appearances: 2 (first in 2020)
- Best result: Group stage

African Mixed Team Championships
- Appearances: 13 (first in 2000)
- Best result: Champions (2017, 2021, 2023)

African Men's Team Championships
- Appearances: 4 (first in 2018)
- Best result: Runners-up (2022)

African Women's Team Championships
- Appearances: 5 (first in 2016)
- Best result: Champions (2020, 2022)

The Egypt national badminton team (Arabic: منتخب مصر لكرة الريشة) represents Egypt in international badminton team competitions. The team is controlled by the Egyptian Badminton Federation, the governing body for badminton in Egypt.

The team was formed in 1991 after the formation of the Egyptian Badminton Federation. In the team's early years, they frequently participated in Arab regional tournaments such as the Arab Games (then called the Pan Arab Games) and the Arab Badminton Championships.

Egypt first qualified for the Sudirman Cup in 2021 after the team won the 2021 African Mixed Team Championships. The team made their first appearance at the Uber Cup in 2020 after winning the African Women's Team Championships for the first time in 2020. The men's team have yet to qualify for the Thomas Cup.

== History ==
=== Men's team ===
In the 1999 Arab Games, the team won their first international team medal, which was a bronze in the men's team event. In 2004, the team finished fourth at 2004 Arab Games men's team event. The team won another bronze at the 2007 Arab Games. In 2008, the team entered the semi-finals of the 2008 Thomas Cup Preliminaries but lost 3–1 to Nigeria. In the 2010 Thomas Cup Preliminaries, the team lost 3–2 to Mauritius in the semi-finals. In 2012, the team lost 3–0 to Nigeria at the 2012 Thomas Cup Preliminaries.

In the 2020 All Africa Men's Team Championships, the team lost in the semi-finals to Mauritius 3–0. In the 2022 All Africa Men's Team Championships in Kampala, the team almost qualified for their first Thomas Cup but lost 3–0 to rivals Algeria. In the 2024 All Africa Men's Team Championships, the team lost 3–2 to Nigeria in the semi-finals.

=== Women's team ===
The Egyptian women's team finished in 5th place at the 1999 Arab Games. In 2004, the women's team emerged as champions at the Arab Games after defeating Jordan, Syria and Algeria in the round robin tournament. At the 2016 African Women's Team Championships, Egypt finished as runners-up after losing 3–0 to Mauritius in the final.

The Egyptian women's team won the 2020 All Africa Men's and Women's Team Badminton Championships in the women's team event. This qualified Egypt for the Uber Cup for the first time. The women's team made their debut in the 2020 Thomas & Uber Cup finals and was placed into Group C with South Korea, Chinese Taipei and Tahiti. The team was placed 3rd in the group after defeating Tahiti in the tie and was placed 9th on the final rankings.

The team won their second African title in 2024 and qualified for their second appearance at the Uber Cup. In the 2022 Uber Cup, the team were placed into Group C with Thailand, Denmark and Malaysia. The team placed 4th in the group and did not advance to the quarter-finals. In 2024, the team suffered shocking defeats when they lost to both Uganda and Nigeria 4–1 on home soil and failed to advance to the semi-finals for the first time.

=== Mixed team ===
Egypt first competed in the African Mixed Team Championships in 2000 but did not advance to the knockout stage. At the 2009 African Mixed Team Championships in Nairobi, the team reached the semi-finals for the first time but lost 3–0 to Seychelles. The team reached the semi-finals for a second consecutive time in 2011 but lost 3–1 to Nigeria.

In 2017, Egypt emerged as African Mixed Team Champions for the first time when the team defeated South Africa 3–1 in the final. The team had a hard task overcoming Nigeria 3–2 in the semi-finals. In 2021, Egypt won the African Mixed Team Championships for the second time after defeating Algeria 4–1 in the final. With this result, the team qualified for their first ever Sudirman Cup. In the 2021 Sudirman Cup, the team were drawn into Group D with Japan, Malaysia and England. The team finished last in the group and placed 15th on the overall rankings.

In 2023, the team qualified for the Sudirman Cup for a second time after defeating Mauritius 3–2 in the African Mixed Team Championships final. The team were placed in Group A with Denmark, Singapore and hosts China. The team placed 16th on the overall rankings.

== Competitive record ==
=== Thomas Cup ===
Year	Round	Pos
1949 to 2006	Did not enter	
2008	Did not qualify	
2010	Did not qualify	
2012	Did not qualify	
2014	Did not enter	
2016	Did not enter	
2018	Did not qualify	
2020	Did not qualify	
2022	Did not qualify	
2024	Did not qualify	
2026	Did not qualify	
2028	To be determined	
2030	To be determined	

=== Uber Cup ===
Year	Round	Pos
1957 to 2006	Did not enter	
2008	Did not qualify	
2010	Did not qualify	
2012	Did not qualify	
2014	Did not enter	
2016	Did not qualify	
2018	Did not qualify	
2020	Group stage	9th
2022	Group stage	16th
2024	Did not qualify	
2026	Did not qualify	
2028	To be determined	
2030	To be determined	

=== Sudirman Cup ===
Year	Round	Pos
1989 to 2019	Did not enter	
2021	Group stage	15th
2023	Group stage	16th
2025	Did not qualify	
2027	To be determined	
2029	To be determined	

=== African Games ===
==== Mixed team ====
Year	Round	Pos
2003	Group stage	
2007	Group stage	
2011	Withdrew	
2015	Quarter-finals	
2019	Semi-finals	3rd
2027	To be determined	

=== African Team Championships ===
==== Men's team ====
Year	Round	Pos
1979 to 2016	Did not enter	
2018	Quarter-finals	
2020	Semi-finals	3rd
2022	Runners-up	2nd
2024	Semi-finals	3rd
2026	Semi-finals	3rd
2028
2030

==== Women's team ====
Year	Round	Pos
1979 to 1988	Did not enter	
2016	Runners-up	2nd
2018	Semi-finals	3rd
2020	Champions	1st
2022	Champions	1st
2024	Group stage	6th
2026	Runners-up	2nd
2028	To be determined	
2030	To be determined	

==== Mixed team ====
Year	Round	Pos
1980 to 1998	Did not enter	
2000	Group stage	
2002	Group stage	
2004	Group stage	
2006	Group stage	
2007	Did not enter	
2009	Semi-finals	4th
2011	Semi-finals	4th
2013	Group stage	
2014	Group stage	
2017	Champions	1st
2019	Semi-finals	3rd
2021	Champions	1st
2023	Champions	1st
2025	Semi-finals	3rd
2027	To be determined	
2029	To be determined	

=== Arab Games ===
==== Men's team ====
Year	Round	Pos
1999	3rd / 4th in group	3rd
2004	Fourth place	4th
2007	3rd / 4th in group	3rd

==== Women's team ====
Year	Round	Pos
1999	Fifth place	5th
2004	Champions	1st
2007	Runners-up	2nd

=== Arab Team Championships ===
==== Men's team ====
Year	Round	Pos
1996	Did not enter	
1998	Did not enter	
2000	Runners-up	2nd
2002	Runners-up	2nd
2004	Runners-up	2nd
2009	Runners-up	2nd
2011	Did not enter	
2017	Did not enter	

==== Women's team ====
Year	Round	Pos
1996	Did not enter	
1998	Did not enter	
2000	Runners-up	2nd
2002	Runners-up	2nd
2004	Third place	3rd
2009	3rd / 4th in group	3rd
2011	Did not enter	
2017	Did not enter	

**Red border color indicates tournament was held on home soil.

== Junior competitive record ==
=== Suhandinata Cup ===
Year	Round	Pos
(China) 2000	Did not enter	
(South Africa) 2002	Did not enter	
(Canada) 2004	Did not enter	
(South Korea) 2006	Group stage	28th of 28
(New Zealand) 2007	Did not enter	
(India) 2008	Did not enter	
(Malaysia) 2009	Did not enter	
(Mexico) 2010	Did not enter	
(Taiwan) 2011	Group stage	20th of 22
(Japan) 2012	Did not enter	
(Thailand) 2013	Did not enter	
(Malaysia) 2014	Group stage	27th of 33
(Peru) 2015	Did not enter	
(Spain) 2016	Did not enter	
(Indonesia) 2017	Group stage	39th of 44
(Canada) 2018	Did not enter	
(Russia) 2019	Did not enter	
(New Zealand) 2020	Cancelled because of COVID-19 pandemic	
(China) 2021	Cancelled because of COVID-19 pandemic	
(Spain) 2022	Group stage	28th of 37
(United States) 2023	Did not enter	
(China) 2024	Did not enter	
(India) 2025	Group stage	30th of 36
(Egypt) 2026	Group stage	42nd of 47

=== African Youth Games ===
==== Men's team ====
Year	Round	Pos
2018	Runners-up	2nd

==== Women's team ====
Year	Round	Pos
2018	Runners-up	2nd

==== Mixed team ====
Year	Round	Pos
2014	Semi-finals	3rd

=== African Junior Team Championships ===
==== Mixed team ====
Year	Round	Pos
1979 to 1999	Did not enter	
2001	Group stage	
2003	Champions	1st
2005	Group stage	
2007	Did not enter	
2009	Group stage	
2011	Third place	3rd
2013	Group stage	
2016	Champions	1st
2021	Runners-up	2nd
2022	Semi-finals	3rd
2024	Runners-up	2nd
2026	Quarter-finals	5th

**Red border color indicates tournament was held on home soil.

== Players ==
=== Current squad ===
As of 2 January 2024

==== Men's team ====
Name	DoB/Age	Ranking of event		
Name	DoB/Age	MS	MD	XD
Adham Hatem Elgamal	4 February 1998 (age 28)	137	214	74
Ahmed Salah	30 September 1990 (age 36)	369	214	287
Kareem Ezzat	10 October 2002 (age 23)	583	370	740
Mahmoud Montaser	15 October 2001 (age 24)	503	370	567
Aly Ashraf	1 May 2001 (age 25)	894	717	740
Abdelrahman Abdelsattar	5 May 2003 (age 23)	1444	717	1021

==== Women's team ====
Name	DoB/Age	Ranking of event		
Name	DoB/Age	WS	WD	XD
Doha Hany	10 September 1997 (age 29)	147	228	74
Nour Ahmed Youssri	17 July 2003 (age 23)	129	228	740
Rahma Eladawy	8 January 1998 (age 28)	338	312	567
Hana Tarek	4 May 1998 (age 28)	405	312	287
Jana Abdelkader	1 October 2004 (age 22)	429	805	1021
Alya Elghandour	25 February 2008 (age 18)	1030	805	740

=== Previous squads ===
==== Uber Cup ====
- 2020, 2022

==== Sudirman Cup ====
- 2021, 2023

==== Pan Arab Games ====
- Men's team: 2007
- Women's team: 2007
