= 2006 African Badminton Championships =

Tournament details
- Dates: 3–10 December
- Edition: 13th
- Venue: Salle OMS El Biar
- Location: Algiers, Algeria

The 2006 African Badminton Championships were the continental badminton championships to crown the best players and teams across Africa. The tournament was held at the Salle OMS El Biar in Algiers, Algeria, from 3 to 10 December 2006.

In the semi-final of the team event, South Africa and Algeria narrowly beat Mauritius and Seychelles to enter the final. South Africa won the final by defeating Algeria 3–0. Nigeria and Kenya withdrew from the tournament after encountering either flight connection or visa problems.

== Medalists ==
Event	Gold	Silver	Bronze
Men's singles	(Algeria) Nabil Lasmari	(Zambia) Eli Mambwe	(South Africa) Chris Dednam
Men's singles	(Algeria) Nabil Lasmari	(Zambia) Eli Mambwe	(South Africa) Willem Viljoen
Women's singles	(Seychelles) Juliette Ah-Wan	(South Africa) Stacey Doubell	(Mauritius) Karen Foo Kune
Women's singles	(Seychelles) Juliette Ah-Wan	(South Africa) Stacey Doubell	(Egypt) Hadia Hosny
Men's doubles	(South Africa) Chris Dednam (South Africa) Roelof Dednam	(South Africa) Dorian James (South Africa) Willem Viljoen	(Seychelles) Georgie Cupidon (Seychelles) Steve Malcouzanne
Men's doubles	(South Africa) Chris Dednam (South Africa) Roelof Dednam	(South Africa) Dorian James (South Africa) Willem Viljoen	(Algeria) Zeradine Ammar (Algeria) Karim Rezig
Women's doubles	(South Africa) Michelle Edwards (South Africa) Stacey Doubell	(Seychelles) Juliette Ah-Wan (Seychelles) Catherina Paulin	(Mauritius) Karen Foo Kune (Mauritius) Amrita Sawaram
Women's doubles	(South Africa) Michelle Edwards (South Africa) Stacey Doubell	(Seychelles) Juliette Ah-Wan (Seychelles) Catherina Paulin	(Egypt) Hadia Hosny (Egypt) Alaa Youssef
Mixed doubles	(Seychelles) Georgie Cupidon (Seychelles) Juliette Ah-Wan	(South Africa) Dorian James (South Africa) Michelle Edwards	(Egypt) Kareem Shedeed (Egypt) Alaa Youssef
Mixed doubles	(Seychelles) Georgie Cupidon (Seychelles) Juliette Ah-Wan	(South Africa) Dorian James (South Africa) Michelle Edwards	(Algeria) Nabil Lasmari (Morocco) Rajae Rochdy
Mixed team	South Africa; Robert Abrahams; Chris Dednam; Roelof Dednam; Dorian James; Willem Viljoen; Chantal Botts; Stacey Doubell; Michelle Edwards; Kerry-Lee Harrington; Charné du Preez	Algeria; Maamar Abdet; Zeradine Ammar; Salim Belmahi; Fateh Bettahar; Salaheddine Boumoussa; Mahlous Mohammed; Karim Rezig; Sid Ali Tabariten; Ryma Boudellaa; Fatma Brahimi; Hakima Cherifi	Seychelles; Georgie Cupidon; Steve Malcouzanne; Juliette Ah-Wan; Danielle Jupiter; Catherina Paulin; Sherley Sedgwick
Mixed team	South Africa; Robert Abrahams; Chris Dednam; Roelof Dednam; Dorian James; Willem Viljoen; Chantal Botts; Stacey Doubell; Michelle Edwards; Kerry-Lee Harrington; Charné du Preez	Algeria; Maamar Abdet; Zeradine Ammar; Salim Belmahi; Fateh Bettahar; Salaheddine Boumoussa; Mahlous Mohammed; Karim Rezig; Sid Ali Tabariten; Ryma Boudellaa; Fatma Brahimi; Hakima Cherifi	Mauritius; Lloyd Alam; Sahir Edoo; Vishal Sawaram; Karen Foo Kune; Amrita Sawaram; Marlyse Marquer

=== Medal table ===
* Host nation (Algeria)

Rank	Nation	Gold	Silver	Bronze	Total
1	South Africa	3	3	2	8
2	Seychelles	2	1	2	5
3	Algeria*	1	1	1.5	3.5
4	Zambia	0	1	0	1
5	Egypt	0	0	3	3
5	Mauritius	0	0	3	3
7	Morocco	0	0	0.5	0.5
Totals (7 entries)		6	6	12	24

== Team event ==
=== Group stage ===
==== Group A ====
Team	Pld	W	L	MF	MA	MD	Pts
South Africa	6	6	0	29	1	+28	6
Algeria	6	5	1	24	6	+18	5
Egypt	6	4	2	22	8	+14	4
Ethiopia	6	3	3	13	17	−4	3
Botswana	6	2	4	12	18	−6	2
Cameroon	6	1	5	4	26	−22	1
Sudan	6	0	6	1	29	−28	0

South Africa	4–1	Algeria
South Africa	5–0	Egypt
South Africa	5–0	Botswana
South Africa	5–0	Ethiopia
South Africa	5–0	Cameroon
South Africa	5–0	Sudan
Algeria	3–2	Egypt
Algeria	5–0	Botswana
Algeria	5–0	Ethiopia
Algeria	5–0	Cameroon
Algeria	5–0	Sudan
Egypt	5–0	Botswana
Egypt	5–0	Ethiopia
Egypt	5–0	Cameroon
Egypt	5–0	Sudan
Botswana	2–3	Ethiopia
Botswana	5–0	Cameroon
Botswana	5–0	Sudan
Ethiopia	5–0	Cameroon
Ethiopia	5–0	Sudan
Cameroon	4–1	Sudan

==== Group B ====
Team	Pld	W	L	MF	MA	MD	Pts
Seychelles	5	5	0	21	4	+15	5
Mauritius	5	4	1	19	6	+13	4
Zambia	5	3	2	14	11	+3	3
Uganda	5	2	3	9	16	−7	2
Ghana	5	1	3	3	22	−19	1
Morocco	5	0	3	2	23	−21	0

Seychelles	5–0	Mauritius
Seychelles	4–1	Zambia
Seychelles	4–1	Uganda
Seychelles	4–1	Ghana
Seychelles	4–1	Morocco
Mauritius	4–1	Zambia
Mauritius	5–0	Uganda
Mauritius	5–0	Ghana
Mauritius	5–0	Morocco
Zambia	4–1	Uganda
Zambia	5–0	Ghana
Zambia	5–0	Morocco
Uganda	4–1	Ghana
Uganda	5–0	Morocco
Ghana	3–2	Morocco

=== Knockout stage ===
Semi-finals
South Africa	3
Mauritius	2
Algeria	3
Seychelles	2

Final
South Africa	3
Algeria	0

=== Final ===
South Africa
3
Salle OMS El Biar, Court 1
6 December 2006

Algeria
0

			1	2	3
1	(South Africa) (Algeria)	Chris Dednam; Karim Rezig	22; 20	20; 22	21; 11
2	(South Africa) (Algeria)	Kerry-Lee Harrington; Hakima Cherifi	21; 8	21; 5
3	(South Africa) (Algeria)	Chris Dednam / Roelof Dednam; Nabil Lasmari / Ammar Zeradine	21; 11	21; 12
4	(South Africa) (Algeria)	Stacey Doubell / Michelle Edwards; Fatma Brahimi / Hakima Cherifi				not played
5	(South Africa) (Algeria)	Dorian James / Michelle Edwards; Ammar Zeradine / Ryma Boudellaa				not played
