= Nabil Lasmari =

French-Algerian badminton player (born 1978)

Nabil Lasmari نبيل لسماري
Personal information
- Born: 8 February 1978 (age 48)
- Height: 1.82 m (6 ft 0 in)

Sport
- Country: Algeria
- Sport: Badminton
- Handedness: Right
- Event: Men's singles

Men's singles
- BWF profile
Medal record
Representing Algeria
Men's badminton
All-Africa Games
Gold medal – first place	2007 Algiers	Men's singles
Bronze medal – third place	2007 Algiers	Mixed team
African Championships
Gold medal – first place	2006 Algiers	Men's singles
Gold medal – first place	2007 Rose Hill	Men's singles
Silver medal – second place	2006 Algiers	Mixed team
Bronze medal – third place	2006 Algiers	Mixed doubles
Bronze medal – third place	2007 Rose Hill	Men's doubles

Nabil Lasmari (born 8 February 1978) is a former French-Algerian badminton player. In France, he played for Roubaix, won four men's singles National Championships title in 1998, 2000, 2002 and 2004. While representing Algeria, Lasmari won the African Championships in 2006 and 2007, also the 2007 All-Africa Games. He competed at the 2008 Olympic Games in Beijing, China. He is now works as a coach in Chantecler club in Bordeaux, France.

== Achievements ==
=== All-Africa Games ===
Men's singles
Year	Venue	Opponent	Score	Result
2007	Salle OMS El Biar; Algiers, Algeria	(Zambia) Eli Mambwe	21–17, 21–13	Gold

=== African Championships ===
Men's singles
Year	Venue	Opponent	Score	Result
2007	Stadium Badminton Rose Hill; Rose Hill, Mauritius	(Zambia) Eli Mambwe	21–16, 23–21	Gold
2006	Salle OMS El Biar; Algiers, Algeria	(Zambia) Eli Mambwe		Bronze

Men's doubles
Year	Venue	Partner	Opponent	Score	Result
2007	Stadium Badminton Rose Hill; Rose Hill, Mauritius	(Algeria) Zeradine Ammar	(Seychelles) Georgie Cupidon (Seychelles) Steve Malcouzane	16–21, 21–16, 17–21	Bronze

Mixed doubles
Year	Venue	Partner	Opponent	Score	Result
2006	Salle OMS El Biar; Algiers, Algeria	(Morocco) Rajae Rochdy	(Seychelles) Georgie Cupidon (Seychelles) Juliette Ah-Wan		Bronze

=== BWF International Challenge/Series ===
Men's singles
Year	Tournament	Opponent	Score	Result
2007	Algeria International	(Iran) Kaveh Mehrabi	21–6, 10–4 Retired	(gold) Winner
2007	Peru International	(Denmark) Sune Gavnholt	22–20, 22–20	(gold) Winner
2007	Iran Fajr International	(Sri Lanka) Niluka Karunaratne	9–21, 21–9, 21–19	(gold) Winner
2004	Luxembourge Memorial Thierry Theis	(Germany) Andreas Wölk	15–10, 15–2	(gold) Winner
2001	Slovenian International	(Slovenia) Andrej Pohar	3–7, 7–2, 1–7, 7–3, 7–3	(gold) Winner
2001	Czech International	(Canada) Bobby Milroy	7–1, 7–4, 2–7, 2–7, 5–7	(silver) Runner-up
2001	Belgian International	(Germany) Conrad Hückstädt	15–9, 15–9	(gold) Winner

Men's doubles
Year	Tournament	Partner	Opponent	Score	Result
2007	Giraldilla International	(France) Lénaïc Luong	(Cuba) Alexander Hernandez (Cuba) Osleni Guerrero	21–18, 21–17	(gold) Winner

Mixed doubles
Year	Tournament	Partner	Opponent	Score	Result
2005	French International	(Indonesia) Eny Widiowati	(Denmark) Jacob Chemnitz (Denmark) Julie Houmann	4–15, 15–7, 15–13	(gold) Winner

BWF International Challenge tournament
BWF International Series tournament
BWF Future Series tournament
