= Algeria national badminton team =

National badminton team representing Algeria

Algeria
- Association: Algerian Badminton Association (FAB)
- Confederation: BCA (Africa)
- President: Mohamed Moncef Zemmouchi

BWF ranking
- Current ranking: 23 ▼1 (7 July 2026)
- Highest ranking: 22 (6 January 2026)

Sudirman Cup
- Appearances: 1 (first in 2025)
- Best result: Group stage

Thomas Cup
- Appearances: 5 (first in 2018)
- Best result: Group stage

African Mixed Team Championships
- Appearances: 9 (first in 2006)
- Best result: Champions (2025)

African Men's Team Championships
- Appearances: 5 (first in 2016)
- Best result: Champions (2018, 2020, 2022, 2024, 2026)

African Women's Team Championships
- Appearances: 4 (first in 2020)
- Best result: Runners-up (2020)

The Algeria national badminton team (Arabic: منتخب الجزائر لكرة الريشة) represents Algeria in international badminton team competitions. The team made their first-ever appearance at the Thomas Cup (World Men's Team Championships) in 2018. The Algerian team have never qualified for the Uber Cup.

The men's team later won the 2020 and 2022 All Africa Men's Team Badminton Championships. This earned the Algerian team a spot in the 2020 and 2022 Thomas Cup. Algeria won their first title in the African Mixed Team Championships in 2025.

== History ==
Badminton was first played in Algeria in the 1990s in the city of Chlef. The sport then grew and began to spread around the cities of Aïn Defla, Relizane, Mostaganem and Boumerdès. The national team was formed around 1996 following the formation of the Algerian Badminton Association. In 1999, the national championships were organized to select the best players for the national setup.

=== Men's team ===
The Algerian men's team first competed in the Pan Arab Games in 1999. The team then finished as runners-up in 2004 and then won gold in 2007 after beating Syria in the final. In 2010, the men's team made their African Men's Team Championship debut but lost in the group stages. In 2018, the Algerian men's team made history by winning the All Africa Men's Team Badminton Championship and qualifying for 2018 Thomas Cup. The team were placed in Group D and lost all their matches against Denmark, Malaysia and Russia.

The team qualified for the 2020 Thomas Cup after winning the 2020 All Africa Men's Team Championship final 3–2 against Mauritius. The team were eliminated in the group stages of the 2020 Thomas Cup. The team won the African Men's Team Championship for a third consecutive time in 2022 after defeating Egypt 3–0. At the 2022 Thomas Cup, the team failed to get past the group stage after finishing on the bottom of their group.

=== Women's team ===
The Algerian women's team debuted in the 1999 Pan Arab Games. In 2018, the women's team debuted in the 2018 All Africa Women's Team Championship and reached the semifinals but lost to Mauritius. The team almost qualified for the 2020 Uber Cup when they finished 2nd at the 2020 All Africa Women's Team Championship. The team were halted in the group stage at the 2022 All Africa Women's Team Badminton Championship.

=== Mixed team ===
The mixed team debuted in the 2003 African Games. They later made their debut at the African Mixed Team Championships in 2006 and finished as runners-up. The team then won bronze in the 2007 African Games. In 2015, the team were halted in the quarter-finals after losing to Seychelles 3–1. In 2019, they lost in the quarter-finals of the 2019 African Mixed Team Championships. After a few months, the team came back stronger and reached the final of the 2019 African Games. The team lost 3–0 to Nigeria in the final.

In 2021, the team lost their chances of qualifying for the Sudirman Cup at the mixed team championships to Egypt. In 2023, they failed to enter the final of the African Mixed Team Championships after losing narrowly to Mauritius. At the 2025 African Mixed Team Championships, the team defeated host nation Cameroon and rivals Egypt in the group stage and advanced to the knockout stages. The team met Egypt for a second time in the semi-finals and defeated Egypt 3–2 to enter the finals. In the final, the team beat former champions Mauritius 3–1 and won the African Mixed Team Championships for the first time since the team's formation in 1996. The victory also granted Algeria qualification for its first ever appearance at the Sudirman Cup.

== Competitive record ==
=== Thomas Cup ===
Year	Round	Pos
1949	Part of France	
1952	Part of France	
1955	Part of France	
1958	Part of France	
1961	Part of France	
1964	Did not enter	
1967	Did not enter	
1970	Did not enter	
1973	Did not enter	
1976	Did not enter	
1979	Did not enter	
1982	Did not enter	
1984	Did not enter	
1986	Did not enter	
1988	Did not enter	
1990	Did not enter	
1992	Did not enter	
1994	Did not enter	
1996	Did not enter	
1998	Did not enter	
2000	Did not enter	
2002	Did not enter	
2004	Did not enter	
2006	Did not qualify	
2008	Did not enter	
2010	Did not qualify	
2012	Did not enter	
2014	Did not enter	
2016	Did not qualify	
2018	Group stage	16th
2020	Group stage	15th
2022	Group stage	16th
2024	Group stage	16th
2026	Group stage	16th
2028	To be determined	
2030	To be determined	

=== Uber Cup ===
Year	Round	Pos
1957	Part of France	
1960	Part of France	
1963	Did not enter	
1966	Did not enter	
1969	Did not enter	
1972	Did not enter	
1975	Did not enter	
1978	Did not enter	
1981	Did not enter	
1984	Did not enter	
1986	Did not enter	
1988	Did not enter	
1990	Did not enter	
1992	Did not enter	
1994	Did not enter	
1996	Did not enter	
1998	Did not enter	
2000	Did not enter	
2002	Did not enter	
2004	Did not enter	
2006	Did not enter	
2008	Did not enter	
2010	Did not enter	
2012	Did not enter	
2014	Did not enter	
2016	Did not enter	
2018	Did not qualify	
2020	Did not qualify	
2022	Did not qualify	
2024	Did not qualify	
2026	Did not qualify	
2028	To be determined	
2030	To be determined	

=== Sudirman Cup ===
Year	Round	Pos
1989	Did not enter	
1991	Did not enter	
1993	Did not enter	
1995	Did not enter	
1997	Did not enter	
1999	Did not enter	
2001	Did not enter	
2003	Did not enter	
2005	Did not enter	
2007	Did not enter	
2009	Did not enter	
2011	Did not enter	
2013	Did not enter	
2015	Did not enter	
2017	Did not enter	
2019	Did not enter	
2021	Did not qualify	
2023	Did not qualify	
2025	Group stage	16th
2027	To be determined	
2029	To be determined	

=== African Games ===
==== Mixed team ====
Year	Round	Pos
2003	Did not enter	
2007	Semi-finals	4th
2011	Did not enter	
2015	Quarter-finals	-
2019	Runners-up	2nd
2027	To be determined	

=== African Team Championships ===
==== Men's team ====
Year	Round	Pos
1979 to 1988	Did not enter	
2016	Semi-finals	3rd
2018	Champions	1st
2020	Champions	1st
2022	Champions	1st
2024	Champions	1st
2026	Champions	1st
2028	To be determined	
2030	To be determined	

==== Women's team ====
Year	Round	Pos
1979 to 2016	Did not enter	
2018	Semi-finals	4th
2020	Runners-up	2nd
2022	Group stage	
2024	Semi-finals	3rd
2026	Semi-finals	3rd
2028	To be determined	
2030	To be determined	

==== Mixed team ====
Year	Round	Pos
1980 to 2004	Did not enter	
2006	Runners-up	2nd
2007	Group stage	-
2009	Group stage	-
2011	Group stage	-
2013	Did not enter	
2014	Did not enter	
2017	Group stage	-
2019	Quarter-finals	-
2021	Runners-up	2nd
2023	Semi-finals	3rd
2025	Champions	1st
2027	To be determined	
2029	To be determined	

=== Islamic Solidarity Games ===
==== Men's team ====
Year	Round	Pos
2013	Withdrew	

==== Women's team ====
Year	Round	Pos
2013	Withdrew	

=== Arab Games ===
==== Men's team ====
Year	Round	Pos
1999	Did not enter	
2004	Runners-up	2nd
2007	Champions	1st

==== Women's team ====
Year	Round	Pos
1999	Did not enter	
2004	Fourth place	4th
2007	Sixth place	6th

=== Arab Team Championships ===
==== Men's team ====
Year	Round	Pos
1996	Did not enter	
1998	Did not enter	
2000	Did not enter	
2002	Group stage	5th
2004	Did not enter	
2009	Did not enter	
2011	Did not enter	
2017	Runners-up	2nd

==== Women's team ====
Year	Round	Pos
1996	Did not enter	
1998	Did not enter	
2000	Did not enter	
2002	Third place	3rd
2004	Did not enter	
2009	Did not enter	
2011	Did not enter	
2017	Champions	1st

**Red border color indicates tournament was held on home soil.

== Junior competitive record ==
=== Suhandinata Cup ===
Year	Round	Pos
2000 to 2012	Did not enter	
2013	Withdrew	
2014	Did not enter	
2015	Did not enter	
2016	Group stage	51st
2017	Withdrew	
2018	Withdrew	
2019	Did not enter	
2022	Did not enter	
2023	Did not enter	
2024	Did not enter	
2025	Did not enter	
2026	Group stage	45th of 47

=== African Youth Games ===
==== Men's team ====
Year	Round	Pos
2018	Semi-finals	3rd

==== Women's team ====
Year	Round	Pos
2018	Champions	1st

==== Mixed team ====
Year	Round	Pos
2014	Did not enter	

=== African Junior Team Championships ===
==== Mixed team ====
Year	Round	Pos
1979 to 2001	Did not enter	
2003	Group stage	-
2005	Group stage	-
2007	Did not enter	
2009	Group stage	-
2011	Fourth place	4th
2013	Semi-finals	3rd
2016	Runners-up	2nd
2021	Did not enter	
2022	Runners-up	2nd
2024	Semi-finals	3rd
2026	Runners-up	2nd

=== Arab Junior Team Championships ===
==== Men's team ====
Year	Round	Pos
2003	Did not enter	
2005	Did not enter	
2007	Group stage	6th
2009	Did not enter	
2016	Champions	1st

==== Women's team ====
Year	Round	Pos
2003	Did not enter	
2005	Did not enter	
2007	Group stage	6th
2009	Did not enter	
2016	Champions	1st

**Red border color indicates tournament was held on home soil.

== Staff ==
The following list shows the coaching staff for the Algerian national badminton team.

Name	Role
(Algeria) Nourine Salim	Head coach

== Players ==
=== Current squad ===
As of 2 April 2024

==== Men's team ====
Name	DoB/Age	Ranking of event		
Name	DoB/Age	MS	MD	XD
Mohamed Abderrahime Belarbi	8 August 1992 (age 34)	355	183	740
Adel Hamek	25 October 1992 (age 33)	222	183	740
Koceila Mammeri	23 February 1999 (age 27)	-	62	46
Youcef Sabri Medel	5 July 1996 (age 30)	268	62	-
Sifeddine Larbaoui	30 June 2002 (age 24)	407	251	424
Mohamed Abdelaziz Ouchefoun	9 September 2001 (age 25)	344	251	381

==== Women's team ====
Name	DoB/Age	Ranking of event		
Name	DoB/Age	WS	WD	XD
Halla Bouksani	30 July 2000 (age 26)	267	131	746
Celia Mounib	20 August 1998 (age 28)	377	427	424
Tanina Mammeri	17 June 2003 (age 23)	216	131	46
Yasmina Chibah	23 November 1999 (age 26)	256	136	746
Linda Mazri	21 December 2001 (age 24)	387	136	746
Malak Ouchefoun	23 August 2003 (age 23)	293	593	381

=== Previous squads ===
==== Thomas Cup ====
- 2020, 2022

==== Pan Arab Games ====
- Men's team: 2007
- Women's team: 2007
