= Jordanian Association for Badminton =

- Sport: Badminton
- Jurisdiction: Jordan
- Abbreviation: JAB
- Founded: 1993
- Affiliation: Badminton World Federation, Badminton Asia Confederation, Arab Union for Badminton
- Headquarters: Amman, Jordan

Official website
- jordan-badminton.com
- (Jordan)

The Jordanian Association for Badminton was formed in 1993 and is the national governing body of Badminton in Jordan.

== Tournaments ==
- Jordan International

== Affiliation ==
- Badminton World Federation
- Badminton Asia Confederation
- Arab Union for Badminton
