= Mauritania national badminton team =

Mauritania
- Association: Mauritanian Badminton Federation
- Confederation: Badminton Confederation of Africa
- President: Mohamed Ould el-Hacen

BWF ranking
- Current ranking: Unranked
- Highest ranking: Unranked

The Mauritania national badminton team (Arabic: المنتخب الوطني لكرة الريشة للجمهورية الإسلامية الموريتانية) represents Mauritania in international badminton team competitions. The Mauritanian team is controlled by the Mauritanian Badminton Federation, which is the governing body for Mauritanian badminton. Mauritania competes in badminton at the Pan Arab Games.

== History ==
Mauritania made its badminton debut in the 1999 Pan Arab Games in Amman, Jordan where badminton was first contested in the Games. The national team have never entered the semifinals.

== Competitive record ==
=== Pan Arab Games ===
Men's team

Year	Result
(Jordan) 1999	Group stage

== Players ==
=== Squad ===
As of the 2007 Pan Arab Games

==== Men's team ====
Name	DoB/Age	Ranking of event		
Name	DoB/Age	MS	MD	XD
Sayed Ibrahim	1987 (age 37–38)	-	-	-
