= Syria national badminton team =

National badminton team representing Syria

Syria
- Association: Syria Arab Badminton Association (SABA)
- Confederation: BA (Asia)
- President: Kholoud Bitar

BWF ranking
- Current ranking: 65 ▼1 (2 January 2024)
- Highest ranking: 62 (4 July 2023)

Asian Mixed Team Championships
- Appearances: 1 (first in 2023)
- Best result: Group stage

The Syria national badminton team (Arabic: منتخب كرة الريشة الوطني السوري) represents Syria in international badminton team competitions. The national team is controlled by the Syria Arab Badminton Association. The national team is recognized in the BWF as the Syrian Arab Republic.

The Syrian national badminton team first competed in the 1999 Pan Arab Games. The Syrian national badminton team won the men's team and women's team events twice and finished as runners-ups in 2004 and 2007.

The Syrian junior team competed in the 2011 Asian Junior Badminton Championships mixed team event. Former Syrian national player, Aram Mahmoud was the first Syrian-born badminton athlete to play at the Summer Olympics.

== History ==
Syria was one of the first few Arab countries to embark on competitive badminton. The national team was formed shortly after the establishment of the Syria Arab Badminton Association in 1985. Syria also plays a big role in introducing competitive badminton to the Arab world.

Syria competed in their first international team event at the 1999 Pan Arab Games and won a total of six gold medals in all disciplines.

=== Men's team ===
The Syrian men's team won the men's team event two consecutive times at the Pan Arab Games in 1999 and 2004 respectively. In 2007, the team failed to retain their title after finishing as second best in the round-robin event.

=== Women's team ===
The Syrian women's team competed in the 1999 Pan Arab Games and won first place in the championships after defeating Egypt. The Syrian team failed to win for a second time in 2004 and finished as group runner-up. At the 2007 Pan Arab Games, the Syrian team recaptured the women's team title after defeating Egypt, Sudan, Jordan and Iraq to secure first place position in the group.

=== Mixed team ===
The Syrian mixed team made their Asian Team Championships debut in 2023. The team were grouped with Indonesia, Thailand, Bahrain and Lebanon in Group C. The team were overpowered by Indonesia and Thailand in the first two matches. In their third match, the team defeated Lebanon 5−0. The team finished in 12th place on the overall rankings after failing to beat Bahrain in their final match.

== Competitive record ==
=== Thomas Cup ===
Year	Round	Pos
1949	Did not enter	
1952	Did not enter	
1955	Did not enter	
1958	Did not enter	
1961	Did not enter	
1964	Did not enter	
1967	Did not enter	
1970	Did not enter	
1973	Did not enter	
1976	Did not enter	
1979	Did not enter	
1982	Did not enter	
1984	Did not enter	
1986	Did not enter	
1988	Did not enter	
1990	Did not enter	
1992	Did not enter	
1994	Did not enter	
1996	Did not enter	
1998	Did not enter	
2000	Did not enter	
2002	Did not enter	
2004	Did not enter	
2006	Did not enter	
2008	Did not enter	
2010	Did not enter	
2012	Did not enter	
2014	Did not enter	
2016	Did not enter	
2018	Did not enter	
2020	Did not enter	
2022	Did not enter	
2024	TBD	
2026	TBD	
2028	TBD	
2030	TBD	

=== Uber Cup ===
Year	Round	Pos
1957	Did not enter	
1960	Did not enter	
1963	Did not enter	
1966	Did not enter	
1969	Did not enter	
1972	Did not enter	
1975	Did not enter	
1978	Did not enter	
1981	Did not enter	
1984	Did not enter	
1986	Did not enter	
1988	Did not enter	
1990	Did not enter	
1992	Did not enter	
1994	Did not enter	
1996	Did not enter	
1998	Did not enter	
2000	Did not enter	
2002	Did not enter	
2004	Did not enter	
2006	Did not enter	
2008	Did not enter	
2010	Did not enter	
2012	Did not enter	
2014	Did not enter	
2016	Did not enter	
2018	Did not enter	
2020	Did not enter	
2022	Did not enter	
2024	TBD	
2026	TBD	
2028	TBD	
2030	TBD	

=== Sudirman Cup ===
Year	Round	Pos
1989	Did not enter	
1991	Did not enter	
1993	Did not enter	
1995	Did not enter	
1997	Did not enter	
1999	Did not enter	
2001	Did not enter	
2003	Did not enter	
2005	Did not enter	
2007	Did not enter	
2009	Did not enter	
2011	Did not enter	
2013	Did not enter	
2015	Did not enter	
2017	Did not enter	
2019	Did not enter	
2021	Did not enter	
2023	Did not qualify	
2025	TBD	
2027	TBD	
2029	TBD	

=== Asian Games ===
==== Men's team ====
Year	Round	Pos
1962	Did not enter	
1966	Did not enter	
1970	Did not enter	
1974	Did not enter	
1978	Did not enter	
1982	Did not enter	
1986	Did not enter	
1990	Did not enter	
1994	Did not enter	
1998	Did not enter	
2002	Did not enter	
2006	Did not enter	
2010	Did not enter	
2014	Did not enter	
2018	Did not enter	
2022	Did not enter	
2026	TBD	
2030	TBD	
2034	TBD	
2038	TBD	

==== Women's team ====
Year	Round	Pos
1962	Did not enter	
1966	Did not enter	
1970	Did not enter	
1974	Did not enter	
1978	Did not enter	
1982	Did not enter	
1986	Did not enter	
1990	Did not enter	
1994	Did not enter	
1998	Did not enter	
2002	Did not enter	
2006	Did not enter	
2010	Did not enter	
2014	Did not enter	
2018	Did not enter	
2022	Did not enter	
2026	TBD	
2030	TBD	
2034	TBD	
2038	TBD	

=== Asian Team Championships ===
==== Men's team ====
Year	Round	Pos
1962	Did not enter	
1965	Did not enter	
1969	Did not enter	
1971	Did not enter	
1976	Did not enter	
1983	Did not enter	
1985	Did not enter	
1987	Did not enter	
1989	Did not enter	
1993	Did not enter	
2004	Did not enter	
2006	Did not enter	
2008	Did not enter	
2010	Did not enter	
2012	Did not enter	
2016	Did not enter	
2018	Did not enter	
2020	Did not enter	
2022	Did not enter	
2024	TBD	
2026	TBD	
2028	TBD	
2030	TBD	

==== Women's team ====
Year	Round	Pos
2004	Did not enter	
2006	Did not enter	
2008	Did not enter	
2010	Did not enter	
2012	Did not enter	
2016	Did not enter	
2018	Did not enter	
2020	Did not enter	
2022	Did not enter	
2024	TBD	
2026	TBD	
2028	TBD	
2030	TBD	

==== Mixed team ====
Year	Round	Pos
2017	Did not enter	
2019	Did not enter	
2023	Group stage	12th
2025	TBD	
2027	TBD	
2029	TBD	

=== Arab Games ===
==== Men's team ====
Year	Round	Pos
1999	Champions	1st
2004	Champions	1st
2007	Runners-up	2nd

==== Women's team ====
Year	Round	Pos
1999	Champions	1st
2004	Runners-up	2nd
2007	Champions	1st

=== Arab Team Championships ===
==== Men's team ====
Year	Round	Pos
1996	Champions	1st
1998	Champions	1st
2000	Champions	1st
2002	Champions	1st
2004	Champions	1st
2009	Champions	1st
2011	Champions	1st
2017	Did not enter	

==== Women's team ====
Year	Round	Pos
1996	Champions	1st
1998	Champions	1st
2000	Champions	1st
2002	Champions	1st
2004	Champions	1st
2009	Champions	1st
2011	Champions	1st
2017	Did not enter	

=== Mediterranean Team Championships ===
==== Mixed team ====
Year	Round	Pos
2019	Did not enter	

=== Women's Islamic Games ===
==== Women's team ====
Year	Round	Pos
1993	Third place	3rd
1997	Third place	3rd
2001	Third place	3rd
2005	Group stage	

=== FISU World University Games ===
==== Mixed team ====
Year	Round	Pos
2007	Did not enter	
2011	Group stage	
2013	Did not enter	
2015	Did not enter	
2017	Did not enter	
2021	Did not enter	
2025	TBD	

=== World University Team Championships ===
==== Mixed team ====
Year	Round	Pos
2008	Did not enter	
2010	Did not enter	
2012	Did not enter	
2014	Did not enter	
2016	Did not enter	
2018	Did not enter	

**Red border color indicates tournament was held on home soil.

== Junior competitive record ==
=== Suhandinata Cup ===
Year	Round	Pos
2000	Did not enter	
2002	Did not enter	
2004	Did not enter	
2006	Did not enter	
2007	Did not enter	
2008	Did not enter	
2009	Did not enter	
2010	Did not enter	
2011	Did not enter	
2012	Did not enter	
2013	Did not enter	
2014	Did not enter	
2015	Did not enter	
2016	Did not enter	
2017	Did not enter	
2018	Did not enter	
2019	Did not enter	
2022	Did not enter	
2023	Did not enter	
2024	TBD	

=== Asian Junior Team Championships ===
==== Boys' team ====
Year	Round	Pos
1997	Round of 32	
1998	Did not enter	
1999	Did not enter	
2000	Did not enter	
2001	Did not enter	
2002	Did not enter	
2004	Did not enter	
2005	Did not enter	

==== Girls' team ====
Year	Round	Pos
1997	Did not enter	
1998	Did not enter	
1999	Did not enter	
2000	Did not enter	
2001	Did not enter	
2002	Did not enter	
2004	Did not enter	
2005	Did not enter	

==== Mixed team ====
Year	Round	Pos
2006	Did not enter	
2007	Did not enter	
2008	Did not enter	
2009	Did not enter	
2010	Did not enter	
2011	Group stage	
2012	Did not enter	
2013	Did not enter	
2014	Did not enter	
2015	Did not enter	
2016	Did not enter	
2017	Did not enter	
2018	Did not enter	
2019	Did not enter	
2023	Did not enter	
2024	TBD	
2025	TBD	

=== Arab Junior Team Championships ===
==== Boys' team ====
Year	Round	Pos
2003	Champions	1st
2005	Champions	1st
2007	Champions	1st
2007	Group stage (Team B)	5th
2009	Champions	1st
2016	Did not enter	

==== Girls' team ====
Year	Round	Pos
2003	Champions	1st
2005	Champions	1st
2007	Runners-up	2nd
2007	Group stage (Team B)	5th
2009	Champions	1st
2016	Did not enter	

=== Mediterranean Junior Team Championships ===
==== Mixed team ====
Year	Round	Pos
2015	Group stage	7th
2017	Did not enter	

**Red border color indicates tournament was held on home soil.

== Players ==
=== Current squad ===
As of 2 January 2024

==== Men's team ====
Name	DoB/Age	Ranking of event		
Name	DoB/Age	MS	MD	XD
Ahmad Aljallad	25 January 1997 (age 28)	544	1084	-
Amjad Alfassih	8 April 2000 (age 24)	-	1084	-
Talal Khoder Agha	1 January 2003 (age 22)	-	-	-
Mostafa Habosh	1 January 2004 (age 21)	-	-	-

==== Women's team ====
Name	DoB/Age	Ranking of event		
Name	DoB/Age	WS	WD	XD
Sanaa Mahmoud	31 January 1995 (age 30)	1243	-	-
Ranim Alhasbani	5 January 2008 (age 17)	1243	-	-
Baraa Alali	7 January 2004 (age 21)	-	-	-
Yara Alsawas	1 January 2004 (age 21)	-	-	-

=== Previous squads ===
==== Asian Team Championships ====
- Mixed team: 2023

==== Pan Arab Games ====
- Men's team: 2007
- Women's team: 2007
