= 2022 Thomas & Uber Cup squads =

Badminton teams at the 2022 events

This article lists the confirmed squad list for the 2022 Thomas & Uber Cup participating teams. The rankings used to decide the order of play are based on the BWF World Ranking per 19 April 2022.

The age listed for each player is on 8 May 2022 which was the first day of the tournament. Only a maximum of twelve players were allowed to compete in each squad.

== Thomas Cup ==
=== Group A ===
==== Indonesia ====
Twelve players represented Indonesia in the 2022 Thomas Cup.

Name	DoB/Age	Ranking of event	
Name	DoB/Age	MS	MD
Anthony Sinisuka Ginting	20 October 1996 (aged 25)	5	
Jonatan Christie	15 September 1997 (aged 24)	8	
Shesar Hiren Rhustavito	28 March 1994 (aged 28)	24	
Tegar Sulistio	22 May 2002 (aged 19)	496	
Syabda Perkasa Belawa	25 August 2001 (aged 20)	626	
Kevin Sanjaya Sukamuljo	2 August 1995 (aged 26)		1
Mohammad Ahsan	7 September 1987 (aged 34)		2
Hendra Setiawan	25 August 1984 (aged 37)		2
Fajar Alfian	7 March 1995 (aged 27)		8
Muhammad Rian Ardianto	13 February 1996 (aged 26)		8
Bagas Maulana	20 July 1998 (aged 23)		20
Muhammad Shohibul Fikri	16 November 1999 (aged 22)		20

==== South Korea ====
Badminton Korea Association confirmed nine players to represent South Korea in the 2022 Thomas Cup.

Name	DoB/Age	Ranking of event	
Name	DoB/Age	MS	MD
Heo Kwang-hee	11 August 1995 (aged 26)	30	
Jeon Hyeok-jin	13 June 1995 (aged 26)	267	
Lee Yun-gyu	1 November 1997 (aged 24)	596	
Choi Sol-gyu	5 August 1995 (aged 26)		12
Seo Seung-jae	4 September 1997 (aged 24)		12
Kang Min-hyuk	17 February 1999 (aged 23)		52
Na Sung-seung	28 August 1999 (aged 22)		67
Kim Won-ho	2 June 1999 (aged 22)		70
Jin Yong	8 April 2003 (aged 19)		235

==== Thailand ====
Twelve players represented Thailand in the 2022 Thomas Cup.

Name	DoB/Age	Ranking of event	
Name	DoB/Age	MS	MD
Kunlavut Vitidsarn	11 May 2001 (aged 20)	18	
Kantaphon Wangcharoen	18 September 1998 (aged 23)	21	
Sitthikom Thammasin	7 April 1995 (aged 27)	31	
Khosit Phetpradab	8 July 1994 (aged 27)	43	
Adulrach Namkul	2 November 1997 (aged 24)	140	
Chaloempon Charoenkitamorn	15 April 1997 (aged 25)		303
Nanthakarn Yordphaisong	23 September 1993 (aged 28)		303
Panitchaphon Teeraratsakul	11 November 2004 (aged 17)	606	558
Pakkapon Teeraratsakul	11 November 2004 (aged 17)	847	558
Tanadon Punpanich	1 October 2002 (aged 19)		661
Wachirawit Sothon	22 January 2000 (aged 22)		661
Peeratchai Sukphun	31 August 2004 (aged 17)		1641

==== Singapore ====
Name	DoB/Age	Ranking of event	
Name	DoB/Age	MS	MD
Loh Kean Yew	26 June 1997 (aged 24)	10	
Jason Teh	25 August 2000 (aged 21)	93	
Joel Koh	23 November 2000 (aged 21)	222	
Lim Ming Hong	23 March 2002 (aged 20)	2520	
Terry Hee	6 July 1995 (aged 26)		60
Loh Kean Hean	12 March 1995 (aged 27)		60
Danny Bawa Chrisnanta	30 December 1988 (aged 33)		163
Andy Kwek	22 April 1999 (aged 23)		163
Wesley Koh	13 July 2002 (aged 19)		359
Junsuke Kubo	11 May 2002 (aged 19)		359
Lim Shun Tian	27 February 2002 (aged 20)		

=== Group B ===
==== Denmark ====
Twelve players represented Denmark in the 2022 Thomas Cup.

Name	DoB/Age	Ranking of event	
Name	DoB/Age	MS	MD
Viktor Axelsen	4 January 1994 (aged 28)	1	
Anders Antonsen	27 April 1997 (aged 25)	3	
Rasmus Gemke	11 January 1997 (aged 25)	13	
Hans-Kristian Vittinghus	16 January 1986 (aged 36)	22	
Victor Svendsen	2 August 1995 (aged 26)	59	
Kim Astrup	6 March 1992 (aged 30)		10
Anders Skaarup Rasmussen	15 February 1989 (aged 33)		10
Rasmus Kjær	4 October 1998 (aged 23)		56
Lasse Mølhede	25 October 1993 (aged 28)		57
Jeppe Bay	4 March 1997 (aged 25)		57
Mathias Christiansen	20 February 1994 (aged 28)		84
Frederik Søgaard	25 July 1997 (aged 24)		214

==== China ====
Twelve players represented China in the 2022 Thomas Cup.

Name	DoB/Age	Ranking of event	
Name	DoB/Age	MS	MD
Lu Guangzu	19 October 1996 (aged 25)	25	
Zhao Junpeng	2 February 1996 (aged 26)	37	
Sun Feixiang	15 May 1998 (aged 23)	54	
Li Shifeng	9 January 2000 (aged 22)	64	
Weng Hongyang	18 June 1999 (aged 22)	81	
He Jiting	19 February 1998 (aged 24)		18
Tan Qiang	16 September 1998 (aged 23)		18
Liu Cheng	4 January 1992 (aged 30)		27
Ou Xuanyi	23 January 1994 (aged 28)		29
Liu Yuchen	25 July 1995 (aged 26)		153
Ren Xiangyu	23 October 1998 (aged 23)		157
Zhou Haodong	20 February 1998 (aged 24)		209

==== France ====
Six players represented France in the 2022 Thomas Cup.

Name	DoB/Age	Ranking of event	
Name	DoB/Age	MS	MD
Toma Junior Popov	29 September 1998 (aged 23)	28	30
Christo Popov	8 March 2002 (aged 20)	56	30
Arnaud Merklé	25 April 2000 (aged 22)	60	
Alex Lanier	26 January 2005 (aged 17)	145	
Fabien Delrue	22 June 2000 (aged 21)		42
William Villeger	22 October 2000 (aged 21)		42

==== Algeria ====
Name	DoB/Age	Ranking of event	
Name	DoB/Age	MS	MD
Youcef Sabri Medel	5 July 1996 (aged 25)	136	58
Koceila Mammeri	23 February 1992 (aged 30)	207	58
Mohamed Abderrahime Belarbi	8 August 1992 (aged 29)	224	109
Adel Hamek	25 October 1992 (aged 29)	244	109
Sifeddine Larbaoui	30 June 2002 (aged 19)	296	314
Mohamed Abdelaziz Ouchefoun	9 September 2001 (aged 20)	317	314

=== Group C ===
==== Chinese Taipei ====
Ten players represented Chinese Taipei in the 2022 Thomas Cup.

Name	DoB/Age	Ranking of event	
Name	DoB/Age	MS	MD
Chou Tien-chen	8 January 1990 (aged 32)	4	
Wang Tzu-wei	27 February 1995 (aged 27)	15	
Lu Chia-hung	4 March 1997 (aged 25)	118	599
Liao Jhuo-fu	26 July 2002 (aged 19)	2298	
Lee Yang	12 August 1995 (aged 26)		3
Wang Chi-lin	18 January 1995 (aged 27)		3
Lu Ching-yao	7 June 1993 (aged 28)		25
Yang Po-han	13 March 1994 (aged 28)		25
Su Ching-heng	10 November 1992 (aged 29)		26
Ye Hong-wei	1 November 1999 (aged 22)		127

==== India ====
Ten players represented India in the 2022 Thomas Cup.

Name	DoB/Age	Ranking of event	
Name	DoB/Age	MS	MD
Lakshya Sen	16 August 2001 (aged 20)	9	
Srikanth Kidambi	7 February 1993 (aged 29)	11	
Prannoy H. S.	17 July 1992 (aged 29)	23	
Priyanshu Rajawat	1 February 2002 (aged 20)	83	
Satwiksairaj Rankireddy	13 August 2000 (aged 21)		7
Chirag Shetty	4 July 1997 (aged 24)		7
Arjun M. R.	11 May 1997 (aged 24)		38
Dhruv Kapila	1 February 2000 (aged 22)		38
Krishna Prasad Garaga	15 March 2000 (aged 22)		45
Vishnuvardhan Goud Panjala	11 February 2001 (aged 21)		45

==== Germany ====
Twelve players represented Germany in the 2022 Thomas Cup. Fabian Roth was replaced by Samuel Hsiao since he had not recovered from COVID-19.

Name	DoB/Age	Ranking of event	
Name	DoB/Age	MS	MD
Max Weißkirchen	18 October 1996 (aged 25)	68	
Kai Schäfer	13 June 1993 (aged 28)	82	
Samuel Hsiao	25 December 1998 (aged 23)	202	826
Matthias Kicklitz	5 April 2002 (aged 20)	455	
Mark Lamsfuß	19 April 1994 (aged 28)		17
Marvin Seidel	9 November 1995 (aged 26)		17
Jones Ralfy Jansen	12 November 1992 (aged 29)		40
Jan Colin Völker	26 February 1998 (aged 24)		65
Bjarne Geiss	28 November 1997 (aged 24)		65
Daniel Hess	31 July 1998 (aged 23)		130

==== Canada ====
Eight players represented Canada in the 2022 Thomas Cup.

Name	DoB/Age	Ranking of event	
Name	DoB/Age	MS	MD
Brian Yang	25 November 2001 (aged 20)	33	914
Jason Ho-Shue	29 August 1998 (aged 23)	49	35
Nyl Yakura	14 February 1993 (aged 29)		35
B. R. Sankeerth	22 December 1997 (aged 24)	88	243
Victor Lai	19 December 2004 (aged 17)	386	1866
Kevin Lee	10 November 1998 (aged 23)	733	1978
Adam Dong	14 February 1994 (aged 28)		325
Ty Alexander Lindeman	15 August 1997 (aged 24)		483

=== Group D ===
==== Japan ====
Twelve players represented Japan in the 2022 Thomas Cup.

Name	DoB/Age	Ranking of event	
Name	DoB/Age	MS	MD
Kento Momota	1 September 1994 (aged 27)	2	
Kanta Tsuneyama	21 June 1996 (aged 25)	14	
Kenta Nishimoto	30 August 1994 (aged 27)	20	
Kodai Naraoka	30 June 2001 (aged 20)	45	
Riku Hatano	19 June 2001 (aged 20)	201	
Takuro Hoki	14 August 1995 (aged 26)		4
Yugo Kobayashi	10 July 1995 (aged 26)		4
Yuta Watanabe	13 June 1997 (aged 24)		5
Akira Koga	8 March 1994 (aged 28)		23
Taichi Saito	21 April 1993 (aged 29)		23
Yoshinori Takeuchi	8 October 1992 (aged 29)		32
Keiichiro Matsui	5 June 1994 (aged 27)		32

==== Malaysia ====
Twelve players represented Malaysia in the 2022 Thomas Cup.

Name	DoB/Age	Ranking of event	
Name	DoB/Age	MS	MD
Lee Zii Jia	29 March 1998 (aged 24)	6	
Liew Daren	6 August 1987 (aged 34)	34	
Ng Tze Yong	16 May 2000 (aged 21)	46	
Aidil Sholeh	9 January 2000 (aged 22)	100	
Leong Jun Hao	13 July 1999 (aged 22)	124	
Aaron Chia	24 February 1997 (aged 25)		7
Soh Wooi Yik	17 February 1998 (aged 24)		7
Ong Yew Sin	30 January 1995 (aged 27)		11
Teo Ee Yi	4 April 1993 (aged 29)		11
Goh Sze Fei	18 August 1997 (aged 24)		14
Nur Izzuddin	11 November 1997 (aged 24)		14
Chia Wei Jie	3 January 2000 (aged 22)		167

==== England ====
Ten players represented England in the 2022 Thomas Cup.

Name	DoB/Age	Ranking of event	
Name	DoB/Age	MS	MD
Toby Penty	12 August 1992 (aged 29)	51	
Zach Russ	3 July 2000 (aged 21)		73
Johnnie Torjussen	24 June 1996 (aged 25)	200	1430
Cholan Kayan	6 March 2003 (aged 19)	502	556
Sid Palakkal	16 September 2002 (aged 19)	648	
Ben Lane	13 July 1997 (aged 24)		19
Sean Vendy	18 May 1996 (aged 25)		19
Callum Hemming	27 June 1999 (aged 22)		49
Steven Stallwood	1 April 1999 (aged 23)		49
Rory Easton	16 January 2001 (aged 21)		75

==== United States ====
Five players represented United States in the 2022 Thomas Cup. The team was supported by coach Dennis Christensen.

Name	DoB/Age	Ranking of event	
Name	DoB/Age	MS	MD
Enrico Asuncion	8 November 1998 (aged 23)	263	422
Don Henley Averia	9 February 2003 (aged 19)	369	422
William Hu	26 March 2002 (aged 20)	1995	752
Adrian King-Sun Mar	30 September 2004 (aged 17)		
Henry Tang	8 March 2004 (aged 18)	896	

== Uber Cup ==
=== Group A ===
==== Japan ====
Twelve players represented Japan in the 2022 Uber Cup.

Name	DoB/Age	Ranking of event	
Name	DoB/Age	WS	WD
Akane Yamaguchi	6 June 1997 (aged 24)	2	
Nozomi Okuhara	13 March 1995 (aged 27)	5	
Sayaka Takahashi	29 July 1992 (aged 29)	13	
Saena Kawakami	5 December 1997 (aged 24)	42	
Riko Gunji	31 July 2002 (aged 19)	126	704
Yuki Fukushima	6 May 1993 (aged 29)		4
Sayaka Hirota	1 August 1994 (aged 27)		4
Wakana Nagahara	9 January 1996 (aged 26)		5
Mayu Matsumoto	7 August 1995 (aged 26)		5
Chiharu Shida	29 April 1997 (aged 25)		7
Nami Matsuyama	28 June 1998 (aged 23)		7
Misaki Matsutomo	8 February 1992 (aged 30)		908

==== Indonesia ====
Twelve players represented Indonesia in the 2022 Uber Cup.

Name	DoB/Age	Ranking of event	
Name	DoB/Age	WS	WD
Komang Ayu Cahya Dewi	12 October 2002 (aged 19)	317	
Aisyah Sativa Fatetani	14 May 2002 (aged 19)	323	
Bilqis Prasista	24 May 2003 (aged 18)	327	
Tasya Farahnailah	17 August 2004 (aged 17)	347	
Siti Sarah Azzahra	2 January 2003 (aged 19)	646	
Nita Violina Marwah	25 March 2001 (aged 21)		41
Febriana Dwipuji Kusuma	20 February 2001 (aged 21)		114
Amalia Cahaya Pratiwi	14 October 2001 (aged 20)		114
Tryola Nadia	19 January 2002 (aged 20)		196
Melani Mamahit	16 October 2002 (aged 19)		196
Jesita Putri Miantoro	1 May 2002 (aged 20)		412
Lanny Tria Mayasari	8 May 2002 (aged 20)		521

==== France ====
Nine players represented France in the 2022 Uber Cup.

Name	DoB/Age	Ranking of event	
Name	DoB/Age	WS	WD
Qi Xuefei	28 February 1992 (aged 30)	45	
Léonice Huet	21 May 2000 (aged 21)	55	
Yaëlle Hoyaux	1 August 1998 (aged 23)	68	452
Émilie Drouin	2 December 2004 (aged 17)	277	1210
Anne Tran	27 April 1996 (aged 26)		29
Margot Lambert	15 March 1999 (aged 23)		63
Vimala Hériau	10 February 1999 (aged 23)		67
Flavie Vallet	7 October 2002 (aged 19)		122
Émilie Vercelot	5 February 2002 (aged 20)		122

==== Germany ====
Ten players represented Germany in the 2022 Uber Cup. Miranda Wilson was replaced by Florentine Schöffski since Wilson had not recovered from her injury.

Name	DoB/Age	Ranking of event	
Name	DoB/Age	WS	WD
Yvonne Li	30 May 1998 (aged 23)	25	306
Ann-Kathrin Spöri	23 April 2001 (aged 21)	212	1325
Florentine Schöffski	8 May 2003 (aged 19)	982	
Linda Efler	23 January 1995 (aged 27)		25
Isabel Lohau	17 March 1992 (aged 30)		25
Annabella Jäger	16 July 1998 (aged 23)		80
Stine Küspert	24 July 1999 (aged 22)		80
Emma Moszczynski	7 June 2001 (aged 20)		84
Leona Michalski	14 June 2002 (aged 19)	743	152
Selin Hübsch	1 May 2005 (aged 17)	611	396

=== Group B ===
==== China ====
Twelve players represented China in the 2022 Uber Cup.

Name	DoB/Age	Ranking of event	
Name	DoB/Age	WS	WD
Chen Yufei	1 March 1998 (aged 24)	3	
He Bingjiao	21 March 1997 (aged 25)	9	
Wang Zhiyi	29 April 2000 (aged 22)	16	
Han Yue	18 November 1999 (aged 22)	24	
Zhang Yiman	15 January 1997 (aged 25)	35	
Chen Qingchen	23 June 1997 (aged 24)		1
Jia Yifan	29 June 1997 (aged 24)		1
Zheng Yu	7 January 1996 (aged 26)		14
Li Wenmei	2 November 1999 (aged 22)		14
Zhang Shuxian	2 January 2000 (aged 22)		96
Du Yue	15 February 1998 (aged 24)		113
Huang Dongping	20 January 1995 (aged 27)		140

==== Chinese Taipei ====
Ten players represented Chinese Taipei in the 2022 Uber Cup.

Name	DoB/Age	Ranking of event	
Name	DoB/Age	WS	WD
Tai Tzu-ying	20 June 1994 (aged 27)	1	
Hsu Wen-chi	28 September 1997 (aged 24)	75	404
Sung Shuo-yun	15 June 1997 (aged 24)	93	283
Chen Su-yu	19 December 1997 (aged 24)	154	603
Hsu Ya-ching	30 July 1991 (aged 30)		34
Chang Ching-hui	17 May 1996 (aged 25)		59
Lee Chih-chen	3 January 1998 (aged 24)		61
Lin Wan-ching	1 November 1995 (aged 26)		98
Teng Chun-hsun	27 September 2000 (aged 21)		108
Lee Chia-hsin	11 May 1997 (aged 24)	916	179

==== Spain ====
Six players represented Spain in the 2022 Uber Cup.

Name	DoB/Age	Ranking of event	
Name	DoB/Age	WS	WD
Carolina Marín	15 June 1993 (aged 28)	6	
Clara Azurmendi	4 May 1998 (aged 24)	43	53
Beatriz Corrales	3 December 1992 (aged 29)	51	53
Ania Setién	6 March 2003 (aged 19)	309	143
Lucía Rodríguez	8 March 2004 (aged 18)	222	143
Lorena Uslé	16 February 1994 (aged 28)		167

==== Australia ====
Australia sent nine players to compete at the 2022 Uber Cup. The team was supported by three coaches (Stuart Brehaut, Jeff Tho and Leanne Choo) and a physiotherapist.

Name	DoB/Age	Ranking of event	
Name	DoB/Age	WS	WD
Chen Hsuan-yu	6 January 1993 (aged 29)	78	207
Louisa Ma	26 November 1994 (aged 27)	139	704
Tiffany Ho	6 January 1998 (aged 24)	265	279
Angela Yu	8 March 2003 (aged 19)	526	870
Gronya Somerville	10 May 1995 (aged 26)		31
Kaitlyn Ea	25 June 2003 (aged 18)	1139	440
Joyce Choong	20 December 1995 (aged 26)		482
Sylvina Kurniawan	5 May 1988 (aged 34)	501	482
Sydney Go	11 June 2004 (aged 17)	1148	919

=== Group C ===
==== Thailand ====
Twelve players represented Thailand in the 2022 Uber Cup.

Name	DoB/Age	Ranking of event	
Name	DoB/Age	WS	WD
Ratchanok Intanon	5 February 1995 (aged 27)	8	
Pornpawee Chochuwong	22 January 1998 (aged 24)	10	
Busanan Ongbamrungphan	22 March 1996 (aged 26)	11	
Phittayaporn Chaiwan	21 February 2001 (aged 21)	21	
Supanida Katethong	26 October 1997 (aged 24)	26	
Pitchamon Opatniput	4 January 2007 (aged 15)	339	1210
Jongkolphan Kititharakul	1 March 1993 (aged 29)		8
Rawinda Prajongjai	29 June 1993 (aged 28)		8
Benyapa Aimsaard	29 August 2002 (aged 19)		30
Nuntakarn Aimsaard	23 May 1999 (aged 22)		30
Phataimas Muenwong	5 July 1995 (aged 26)		43
Laksika Kanlaha	17 December 1997 (aged 24)	613	165

==== Denmark ====
Ten players represented Denmark in the 2022 Uber Cup. Freja Ravn was replaced by Amalie Schulz due to a cruciate ligament injury.

Name	DoB/Age	Ranking of event	
Name	DoB/Age	WS	WD
Mia Blichfeldt	19 August 1997 (aged 24)	14	
Line Christophersen	14 January 2000 (aged 22)	22	
Line Kjærsfeldt	20 April 1994 (aged 28)	33	
Julie Dawall Jakobsen	25 March 1998 (aged 24)	41	
Sara Thygesen	20 January 1991 (aged 31)		16
Maiken Fruergaard	11 May 1995 (aged 26)		16
Amalie Magelund	13 May 2000 (aged 21)		24
Alexandra Bøje	6 December 1999 (aged 22)		32
Amalie Schulz	26 June 2001 (aged 20)	132	50
Rikke Søby Hansen	1 February 1995 (aged 27)		357

==== Malaysia ====
Twelve players represented Malaysia in the 2022 Uber Cup.

Name	DoB/Age	Ranking of event	
Name	DoB/Age	WS	WD
Kisona Selvaduray	1 October 1998 (aged 23)	58	
Goh Jin Wei	30 January 2000 (aged 22)	77	
Eoon Qi Xuan	2 November 2000 (aged 21)	135	
Myisha Mohd Khairul	27 July 2002 (aged 19)	255	
Tan Zhing Yi	1 August 2003 (aged 18)	1527	
Chan Wen Tse	27 June 2005 (aged 16)		
Pearly Tan	14 March 2000 (aged 22)		13
Thinaah Muralitharan	3 January 1998 (aged 24)		13
Anna Cheong	15 March 1998 (aged 24)		65
Teoh Mei Xing	6 March 1997 (aged 25)		65
Low Yeen Yuan	9 March 2002 (aged 20)		77
Valeree Siow	18 March 2002 (aged 20)		77

==== Egypt ====
Name	DoB/Age	Ranking of event	
Name	DoB/Age	WS	WD
Doha Hany	10 September 1997 (aged 24)	84	47
Nour Ahmed Youssri	17 July 2003 (aged 18)	169	243
Jana Ashraf	26 November 2000 (aged 21)	235	243
Hana Tarek	4 May 1998 (aged 24)	286	272
Jana Abdelkader	1 October 2004 (aged 17)	550	530

=== Group D ===
==== South Korea ====
Twelve players represented South Korea in the 2022 Uber Cup.

Name	DoB/Age	Ranking of event	
Name	DoB/Age	WS	WD
An Se-young	5 February 2002 (aged 20)	4	
Kim Ga-eun	7 February 1998 (aged 24)	18	
Sim Yu-jin	13 May 1999 (aged 22)	48	
Lee Seo-jin	23 December 2004 (aged 17)	1549	1448
Lee So-hee	14 June 1994 (aged 27)		2
Shin Seung-chan	6 December 1994 (aged 27)		2
Kim So-yeong	9 July 1992 (aged 29)		3
Kong Hee-yong	11 December 1996 (aged 25)		3
Baek Ha-na	22 September 2000 (aged 21)		15
Jeong Na-eun	27 June 2000 (aged 21)		33
Kim Hye-jeong	3 January 1998 (aged 24)		33
Lee Yu-rim	27 January 2000 (aged 22)		88

==== India ====
Ten players represented India in the 2022 Uber Cup. Gayathri Gopichand pulled out of the tournament due to injury.

Name	DoB/Age	Ranking of event	
Name	DoB/Age	WS	WD
P. V. Sindhu	5 July 1995 (aged 26)	7	
Aakarshi Kashyap	24 August 2001 (aged 20)	52	
Ashmita Chaliha	18 October 1999 (aged 22)	63	
Unnati Hooda	20 September 2007 (aged 14)	234	
Treesa Jolly	27 May 2003 (aged 18)		36
Simran Singhi	11 April 2002 (aged 20)		82
Ritika Thaker	17 January 2001 (aged 21)		82
Tanisha Crasto	5 May 2003 (aged 19)		176
Shruti Mishra	13 August 2002 (aged 19)		293

==== Canada ====
Nine players represented Canada in the 2022 Uber Cup.

Name	DoB/Age	Ranking of event	
Name	DoB/Age	WS	WD
Michelle Li	3 November 1991 (aged 30)	12	
Wen Yu Zhang	29 August 2002 (aged 19)	82	404
Talia Ng	6 November 2001 (aged 20)	97	404
Rachel Chan	15 November 2003 (aged 18)	120	
Kristen Tsai	11 July 1995 (aged 26)		21
Rachel Honderich	21 April 1996 (aged 26)	313	21
Catherine Choi	1 May 2001 (aged 21)	224	54
Josephine Wu	20 January 1995 (aged 27)		54
Crystal Lai	25 September 2001 (aged 20)		309

==== United States ====
Eight players represented United States in the 2022 Uber Cup.

Name	DoB/Age	Ranking of event	
Name	DoB/Age	WS	WD
Lauren Lam	15 January 2003 (aged 19)	67	199
Jennie Gai	25 February 2001 (aged 21)	91	204
Esther Shi	7 November 2001 (aged 20)	202	286
Natalie Chi	9 October 2004 (aged 17)	580	
Francesca Corbett	3 June 2005 (aged 16)	239	106
Allison Lee	24 March 2002 (aged 20)		106
Kodi Tang Lee	26 June 2004 (aged 17)		199
Sanchita Pandey	16 April 2002 (aged 20)	1524	1381
