= Jordan national badminton team =

National badminton team representing Jordan

Jordan
- Association: Jordanian Association for Badminton (JAB)
- Confederation: BA (Asia)
- President: Mohammad Alejbour

BWF ranking
- Current ranking: 95 ▼21 (2 January 2024)
- Highest ranking: 52 (2 July 2019)

The Jordan national badminton team (Arabic: المنتخب الأردني للريشة الطائرة) represents Jordan in international badminton team competitions. It is organized by the Jordan Badminton Federation, which is the governing body for badminton in Jordan. Jordan competed in the Badminton Asia Championships.

The Jordanian junior team also competed at the 2011 Asian Junior Badminton Championships. The team were eliminated in the group stages.

== History ==
Badminton was introduced to Jordan in the early 1990s. The Jordanian Association for Badminton was established in 1993. The national association then sent their players to compete in the Arab Badminton Championships and the Pan Arab Games.

=== Men's team ===
The Jordanian men's team won bronze at the 2007 Pan Arab Games men's team event.

=== Women's team ===
The Jordanian women's team finished third in the round robin tournament at the 2007 Pan Arab Games women's team event.

== Competitive record ==
Men's team

Year	Result
(Jordan) 1999	Group stage
(Algeria) 2004	Group stage
(Egypt) 2007	(bronze) 3rd / 4th in group

Women's team

Year	Result
(Jordan) 1999	Group stage
(Egypt) 2007	(bronze) 3rd / 4th in group

== Junior competitive record ==
=== Asian Junior Team Championships ===
==== Mixed team ====
Year	Result
2011	Group stage

== Players ==
=== Current squad ===
As of 2 January 2024

==== Men's team ====
Name	DoB/Age	Ranking of event		
Name	DoB/Age	MS	MD	XD
Bahaedeen Ahmad Alshannik	18 July 1997 (age 27)	127	591	–
Izzeldeen Abuarrah	12 May 2003 (age 21)	1444	591	–
Qusai Althawahreh	20 September 2005 (age 19)	1444	717	–
Saif Abu Eid	3 September 2005 (age 19)	1444	717	–
Ayham Abdeleddin	23 May 1998 (age 26)	–	–	–

==== Women's team ====
Name	DoB/Age	Ranking of event		
Name	DoB/Age	WS	WD	XD
Domou Amro	19 March 1998 (age 27)	–	–	–
Maryam Abuarrah	7 November 2007 (age 17)	–	–	–
Marah Omar	8 February 2007 (age 18)	–	–	–
Yasmeen Hammoudeh	10 May 2000 (age 24)	–	–	–
Haneen Derar Al-Wedyan	27 March 1997 (age 28)	–	–	–

=== Previous squads ===
==== Pan Arab Games ====
- Men's team: 2007
- Women's team: 2007
