= Madagascar national badminton team =

National badminton team representing Madagascar

Madagascar
- Association: Fédération Malagasy de Badminton (FMBAD)
- Confederation: BCA (Africa)
- President: Jean-Aime Ravalison

BWF ranking
- Current ranking: Unranked (2 April 2024)
- Highest ranking: 97 (3 January 2023)

African Mixed Team Championships
- Appearances: 4 (first in 1992)
- Best result: Third place (1998)

The Madagascar national badminton team (Malagasy: Ekipa nasionalin’ny badminton eto Madagasikara) represents Madagascar in international badminton team competitions. The team is controlled by the Madagascar Badminton Federation.

Badminton has been played in Madagascar since the early 1980s. Due to the lack of funding for equipment and infrastructure at the time, the sport was only playable in Antananarivo, Toamasina and Antsirabe. The Madagascar Badminton Federation was formed in the 1980s and the country held its first national championships in 1999.

The Malagasy mixed team made their debut in the African Badminton Championships in 1992. Madagascar also first competed in badminton at the Indian Ocean Island Games in 1990.

== History ==
=== Men's team ===
The men's team were runners-up at the 1990 Indian Ocean Island Games, losing to Mauritius in the round robin stage. In 2003, the Malagasy men's team competed in the 2003 Indian Ocean Island Games. The team first lost 5–0 to Réunion and Mauritius in the Group A tie. In the match against Réunion, the team drew head to head against their opponents after Lala Razakasoavina scored the team's first point by defeating Cedric Amounie 12–15, 15–9, 15–7. The team lost the next two matches.

In 2019, the team competed in the 2019 Indian Ocean Island Games. The team lost 5–0 to Réunion and Mauritius in the round robin stage. The team then lost 4–1 to Seychelles in the tie for fourth place. The team competed in the 2023 Indian Ocean Island Games and were defeated by Mauritius in the semi-finals.

=== Women's team ===
In 1990, the team achieved runner-up position at the 1990 Indian Ocean Island Games women's team event. The women's team competed along with the men's team at the 2019 Indian Ocean Island Games. The team first lost 5–0 to hosts Mauritius. They then lost 5–0 to the Maldives and Réunion. In 2023, the team were semi-finalists at the 2023 Indian Ocean Island Games.

=== Mixed team ===
In 1998, the team made history by winning third place for the first time at the African Mixed Team Badminton Championships. The mixed team competed in the 2007 African Mixed Team Championships. The team were grouped with South Africa, Seychelles and Botswana in Group A but were eliminated in the group stages.

== Competitive record ==
=== Thomas Cup ===
Year	Round	Pos
1949 to 1958	Part of France	
1961 to 2024	Did not enter	
2026	Did not qualify	
2028	To be determined	
2030	To be determined	

=== Uber Cup ===
Year	Round	Pos
1957	Part of France	
1960	Part of France	
1963 to 2026	Did not enter	
2028	To be determined	
2030	To be determined	

=== Sudirman Cup ===
Year	Round	Pos
1989 to 2023	Did not enter	
2025	To be determined	
2027	To be determined	
2029	To be determined	

=== African Games ===
==== Mixed team ====
Year	Round	Pos
2003	Did not enter	
2007	Did not enter	
2011	Did not enter	
2015	Did not enter	
2019	Did not enter	
2027	To be determined	

=== African Team Championships ===
==== Men's team ====
Year	Round	Pos
1979 to 2024	Did not enter	
2026	Group stage	11th
2028	To be determined	
2030	To be determined	

==== Women's team ====
Year	Round	Pos
1979 to 2026	Did not enter	
2028	To be determined	
2030	To be determined	

==== Mixed team ====
Year	Round	Pos
1980 to 1988	Did not enter	
1992	Group stage	7th
1994	Group stage	
1998	Third place	3rd
2000	Did not enter	
2002	Did not enter	
2004	Did not enter	
2006	Did not enter	
2007	Group stage	
2009	Did not enter	
2013	Did not enter	
2014	Did not enter	
2017	Did not enter	
2019	Did not enter	
2021	Did not enter	
2023	Did not enter	
2025	To be determined	
2027	To be determined	
2029	To be determined	

=== Indian Ocean Island Games ===
==== Men's team ====
Year	Round	Pos
1979	Did not enter	
1990	Runners-up	2nd
1993	Fifth place	5th
1998	Fifth place	5th
2003	Group stage	5th
2011	Group stage	5th
2015	Fifth place	5th
2019	Fifth place	5th
2023	Semi-finals	4th
2027	To be determined	

==== Women's team ====
Year	Round	Pos
1979	Did not enter	
1990	Runners-up	2nd
1993	Fifth place	5th
1998	Fifth place	5th
2003	Group stage	5th
2011	Fourth place	4th
2015	Fifth place	5th
2019	Fourth place	4th
2023	Semi-finals	4th
2027	To be determined	

==== Mixed team ====
Year	Round	Pos
1985	Did not enter	

**Red border color indicates tournament was held on home soil.

== Junior competitive record ==
=== Suhandinata Cup ===
Year	Round	Pos
2000 to 2023	Did not enter	
2024	To be determined	

=== African Youth Games ===
==== Men's team ====
Year	Round	Pos
2018	Did not enter	

==== Women's team ====
Year	Round	Pos
2018	Did not enter	

==== Mixed team ====
Year	Round	Pos
2014	Did not enter	

=== African Junior Team Championships ===
==== Mixed team ====
Year	Round	Pos
1979 to 2022	Did not enter	
2024	To be determined	

**Red border color indicates tournament was held on home soil.

== Staff ==
The following list shows the coaching staff for the national badminton team of Madagascar.

Name	Role
(Madagascar) Marc Jocelyn Vonjinirina	Coach

== Players ==
=== Current squad ===
==== Men's team ====
Name	DoB/Age	Ranking of event		
Name	DoB/Age	MS	MD	XD
Sitraka Randrianantenaina	1 September 1998 (age 28)	–	–	–
Julio Keman Randriamalala	23 March 2000 (age 26)	–	–	–
Tokinirina Rakotojaona	23 July 1999 (age 27)	–	–	–

==== Women's team ====
Name	DoB/Age	Ranking of event		
Name	DoB/Age	WS	WD	XD
Soaniaina Razanamaly	9 April 1995 (age 31)	–	–	–
Mamisoa Razafimamonjiarison	10 February 2002 (age 24)	–	–	–
Miotisoa Arijesa	31 March 2001 (age 25)	–	–	–

=== Previous squads ===
==== African Team Championships ====
- Mixed team: 1998, 2007

==== Indian Ocean Island Games ====
- Men's team: 2019
- Women's team: 2019
