= Réunion national badminton team =

National badminton team representing Réunion

Réunion
- Association: Ligue Nouvelle du Badminton Réunionnais (LNBR)
- Confederation: BCA (Africa)
- President: Christophe Chenut

BWF ranking
- Current ranking: 64 ▼9 (2 April 2024)
- Highest ranking: 53 (4 July 2023)

African Mixed Team Championships
- Appearances: 4 (first in 2004)
- Best result: Quarter-finals (2023)

African Men's Team Championships
- Appearances: 2 (first in 2016)
- Best result: Quarter-finals (2022)

African Women's Team Championships
- Appearances: 2 (first in 2016)
- Best result: Group stage

The Réunion national badminton team (French: Équipe nationale de badminton de la Réunion; Réunion Creole: Ekip nasional badminton La Rényon) represents Réunion, an overseas department and region of France, in international team competitions. The team is controlled by Ligue Nouvelle du Badminton Réunionnais, the governing body of badminton in the region.

In 2016, the Badminton World Federation granted Ligue Nouvelle du Badminton Réunionnais association membership, allowing the national players to compete under the Reunion flag in international tournaments and enter qualification for the international team events, that is the Thomas Cup, the Uber Cup and the Sudirman Cup.

Réunion hosted the first Indian Ocean Island Games in 1979 which introduced badminton as one of the few main sports in the games. Reunion also first competed in the African Badminton Championships in 2004 although the team were not affiliated members of the Badminton Confederation of Africa and the Badminton World Federation at the time.

== History ==
=== Men's team ===
In the 1979 Indian Ocean Island Games, Réunion finished in second place behind Mauritius in the men's team event. In the 1990 Indian Ocean Island Games, the team placed fourth after losing to Seychelles. The team were runners-up at the Indian Ocean Island Games from 1993 to 2003.

In 2016, the team competed in the 2016 Africa Men's Team Championships. The team were drawn into Group A with South Africa, Mauritius and Zimbabwe. The team lost 4–1 to South Africa. The team then lost 3–2 to Mauritius. The team finished third in their group after defeating Zimbabwe 5–0.

In 2022, the team entered the quarter-finals of the African Men's Team Championships but lost 3–2 to Mauritius.

=== Women's team ===
In the 1990 Indian Ocean Island Games, the team placed third after defeating Seychelles. In 2016, the team competed in the 2016 Africa Women's Team Championships but were eliminated in the group stages. In 2019, the team were runners-up at the 2019 Indian Ocean Island Games women's team event. In 2022, the women's team lost to South Africa and Mauritius in the group stage of the African Women's Team Championships.

=== Mixed team ===
In the 1985 Indian Ocean Island Games, the team finished third in the mixed team event after losing 3–2 to the Maldives. In 2004, the team competed in the 2004 African Mixed Team Championships. The team were drawn into Group B. The team lost to Nigeria and Seychelles but placed third in their group by defeating Botswana, Swaziland and Algeria.

In 2021, the team competed in the 2021 African Mixed Team Championships and were drawn into Group A with Algeria and Zambia. The team failed to advance to the knockout round. In the 2023 African Mixed Team Championships, the team entered the knockout stages for the first time by defeating Botswana in the group stage to finish second in their group. The team lost in the quarter-finals to Algeria.

== Competitive record ==
=== Thomas Cup ===
Year	Round	Pos
1949 to 2014	Did not enter	
2016	Did not qualify	
2018	Did not enter	
2020	Did not enter	
2022	Did not qualify	
2024	Did not enter	
2026	To be determined	
2028	To be determined	
2030	To be determined	

=== Uber Cup ===
Year	Round	Pos
1957 to 2014	Did not enter	
2016	Did not qualify	
2018	Did not enter	
2020	Did not enter	
2022	Did not qualify	
2024	Did not enter	
2026	To be determined	
2028	To be determined	
2030	To be determined	

=== Sudirman Cup ===
Year	Round	Pos
1989 to 2019	Did not enter	
2021	Did not qualify	
2023	Did not qualify	
2025	Did not qualify	
2027	To be determined	
2029	To be determined	

=== African Games ===
==== Mixed team ====
Year	Round	Pos
2003	Did not enter	
2007	Did not enter	
2011	Did not enter	
2015	Did not enter	
2019	Did not enter	
2027	To be determined	

=== African Team Championships ===
==== Men's team ====
Year	Round	Pos
1979 to 1988	Did not enter	
2016	Group stage	
2018	Did not enter	
2020	Did not enter	
2022	Quarter-finals	5th
2024	Did not enter	
2026	To be determined	
2028	To be determined	
2030	To be determined	

==== Women's team ====
Year	Round	Pos
1979 to 1988	Did not enter	
2016	Group stage	
2018	Did not enter	
2020	Did not enter	
2022	Group stage	
2024	Did not enter	
2026	To be determined	
2028	To be determined	
2030	To be determined	

==== Mixed team ====
Year	Round	Pos
1980 to 2002	Did not enter	
2004	Group stage	
2006	Did not enter	
2007	Did not enter	
2009	Did not enter	
2011	Did not enter	
2013	Did not enter	
2014	Did not enter	
2017	Did not enter	
2019	Did not enter	
2021	Group stage	
2023	Quarter-finals	7th
2025	Group stage	8th
2027	To be determined	
2029	To be determined	

=== Indian Ocean Island Games ===
==== Men's team ====
Year	Round	Pos
1979	Runners-up	2nd
1990	Fourth place	4th
1993	Runners-up	2nd
1998	Runners-up	2nd
2003	Runners-up	2nd
2011	Semi-finals	3rd
2015	Semi-finals	3rd
2019	Runners-up	2nd
2023	Semi-finals	3rd
2027	To be determined	

==== Women's team ====
Year	Round	Pos
1979	Runners-up	2nd
1990	Third place	3rd
1993	Runners-up	2nd
1998	Runners-up	2nd
2003	Third place	3rd
2011	Third place	3rd
2015	Semi-finals	4th
2019	Runners-up	2nd
2023	Semi-finals	3rd
2027	To be determined	

==== Mixed team ====
Year	Round	Pos
1985	Third place	3rd

**Red border color indicates tournament was held on home soil.

== Junior competitive record ==
=== Suhandinata Cup ===
Year	Round	Pos
2000 to 2023	Did not enter	
2024	To be determined	

=== African Youth Games ===
==== Men's team ====
Year	Round	Pos
2018	Did not enter	

==== Women's team ====
Year	Round	Pos
2018	Did not enter	

==== Mixed team ====
Year	Round	Pos
2014	Did not enter	

=== African Junior Team Championships ===
==== Mixed team ====
Year	Round	Pos
1979 to 2021	Did not enter	
2022	Group stage	
2024	To be determined	

**Red border color indicates tournament was held on home soil.

== Players ==
=== Current squad ===
As of 2 January 2024

==== Men's team ====
Name	DoB/Age	Ranking of event		
Name	DoB/Age	MS	MD	XD
Aaron Assing	11 April 2004 (age 21)	441	234	740
Xavier Chan	6 September 1993 (age 31)	684	234	229
Grégory Grondin	3 April 2002 (age 23)	1561	717	740
Guillaume Gonthier	6 May 1999 (age 26)	-	534	740
Brivael Aipar	29 September 2003 (age 21)	-	534	740
Hugo Constans	9 June 2005 (age 20)	1561	717	740
Loïc Nanicaoudin	24 November 1999 (age 25)	1561	717	740
Thibauld Cougouille	3 June 1992 (age 33)	1057	534	740

==== Women's team ====
Name	DoB/Age	Ranking of event		
Name	DoB/Age	WS	WD	XD
Emily Grondin	16 January 2007 (age 18)	1134	357	740
Mathilde Lepetit	23 March 1992 (age 33)	836	357	-
Estelle Leperlier	28 February 1992 (age 33)	836	357	740
Emmanuelle Admette	16 March 1998 (age 27)	1134	589	740
Loise Law Kwai	21 November 2002 (age 22)	-	357	567
Ly-Hoa Chai	9 May 1990 (age 35)	-	231	229
Marina Bielle	2 November 1997 (age 27)	1028	231	740
Virginie Testan	10 January 1991 (age 34)	1134	589	567
