= 2007 African Junior Badminton Championships =

Tournament details
- Dates: 19–22 August (Team event); 23–26 August (Individual event)
- Edition: 8th
- Venue: St Joseph's College Sports Hall
- Location: Gaborone, Botswana

The 2007 African Junior Badminton Championships were the continental badminton championships to crown the best youth players and teams across Africa. The tournament was held at the St Joseph's College Sports Hall in Gaborone, Botswana, from 19 to 26 August 2007.

== Tournament ==
The 2007 African Junior Badminton Championships were held in two separate events. The mixed team event, officially All Africa U-19 Mixed Team Championships 2007, was a continental tournament to crown the best team in Africa. A total of 7 countries across Africa registered their players to compete at mixed team event.

The individual event, officially All Africa U-19 Individual Championships 2007, was a continental tournament to crown the best players in Africa holding from 23 to 26 August.

=== Venue ===
This tournament was held at the St Joseph's College Sports Hall in Gaborone with two courts.

== Medalists ==
Event	Gold	Silver	Bronze
Teams	South Africa	Egypt	Mauritius
Teams	South Africa	Egypt	Seychelles
Boys' singles	(South Africa) Jacob Maliekal	(Egypt) Ali Ahmed El-Khateeb	(Nigeria) Isaac Minaphee
Boys' singles	(South Africa) Jacob Maliekal	(Egypt) Ali Ahmed El-Khateeb	(Nigeria) Micheal Onwe
Girls' singles	(South Africa) Shareen Matthews	(Egypt) Dina Nagy	(Seychelles) Cynthia Course
Girls' singles	(South Africa) Shareen Matthews	(Egypt) Dina Nagy	(Egypt) Noran Hassan Elbanna
Boys' doubles	(Egypt) Mahmoud El Sayad (Egypt) Ali Ahmed El-Khateeb	(Nigeria) Isaac Minaphee (Nigeria) Andrew Stephen	(Mauritius) Dimitry Duval (Mauritius) Daven Patchee
Boys' doubles	(Egypt) Mahmoud El Sayad (Egypt) Ali Ahmed El-Khateeb	(Nigeria) Isaac Minaphee (Nigeria) Andrew Stephen	(Zambia) Charles Kalonde (Zambia) Nago Chongo
Girls' doubles	(South Africa) Jennifer Fry (South Africa) Candace Mann	(Egypt) Noran Hassan Elbanna (Egypt) Dina Nagy	(Mauritius) Kate Foo Kune (Mauritius) Yeldy Louison
Girls' doubles	(South Africa) Jennifer Fry (South Africa) Candace Mann	(Egypt) Noran Hassan Elbanna (Egypt) Dina Nagy	(Seychelles) Alisen Camille (Seychelles) Cynthia Course
Mixed doubles	(South Africa) Reinard Louw (South Africa) Jennifer Fry	(South Africa) Jacob Maliekal (South Africa) Candace Mann	(Egypt) Mahmoud El Sayad (Egypt) Noran Hassan Elbanna
Mixed doubles	(South Africa) Reinard Louw (South Africa) Jennifer Fry	(South Africa) Jacob Maliekal (South Africa) Candace Mann	(Mauritius) Daven Patchee (Mauritius) Kate Foo Kune

=== Medal table ===
* Host nation (Botswana)

Rank	Nation	Gold	Silver	Bronze	Total
1	South Africa	5	1	0	6
2	Egypt	1	4	2	7
3	Nigeria	0	1	2	3
4	Mauritius	0	0	4	4
5	Seychelles	0	0	3	3
6	Zambia	0	0	1	1
Totals (6 entries)		6	6	12	24

== Team event ==
=== Group A ===
Pos	Team	Pld	Pts
1	South Africa	2	2
2	Egypt	2	1
3	Botswana (H)	2	0

Source: Africa Badminton
(H) Host

South Africa	4–1	Egypt
South Africa	5–0	Botswana
Egypt	5–0	Botswana

=== Group B ===
Pos	Team	Pld	Pts
1	Mauritius	3	3
2	Seychelles	3	2
3	Zambia	3	1
4	Swaziland	3	0

Source: Africa Badminton

Mauritius	4–1	Seychelles
Mauritius	5–0	Zambia
Mauritius	5–0	Swaziland
Seychelles	3–2	Zambia
Seychelles	5–0	Swaziland
Zambia	5–0	Swaziland

=== Knockout stage ===
Semi-finals
South Africa	3
Seychelles	0
Egypt	3
Mauritius	2

Final
South Africa	3
Egypt	1

=== Final ranking ===
Pos	Team	Pld	W	L	Pts	MD	Final result
1st place, gold medalist(s)	South Africa	4	4	0	4	+13	Champions
2nd place, silver medalist(s)	Egypt	4	3	1	3	+1	Runners-up
3rd place, bronze medalist(s)	Mauritius	4	3	1	3	+12	Eliminated in semi-finals
3rd place, bronze medalist(s)	Seychelles	4	2	2	2	0	Eliminated in semi-finals
5	Zambia	3	1	2	1	−1	Eliminated in group stage
6	Botswana	2	0	2	0	−10	Eliminated in group stage
7	Swaziland	3	0	3	0	−15	Eliminated in group stage
