= Badminton at the 2019 Indian Ocean Island Games =

- Venue: National Badminton Center, Rose Hill
- Dates: 19–24 November
- Nations: 5

Badminton was contested at the 2019 Indian Ocean Island Games in the National Badminton Center, Rose Hill, Mauritius from July 20 to July 26, 2019.

== Medal table ==
| Rank | Nation | Gold | Silver | Bronze | Total |
|---|---|---|---|---|---|
| 1 | Mauritius* | 5 | 2 | 5 | 12 |
| 2 | Réunion | 1 | 3 | 2 | 6 |
| 3 | Maldives | 1 | 1 | 3 | 5 |
| 4 | Seychelles | 0 | 1 | 2 | 3 |
| Totals (4 entries) | | 7 | 7 | 12 | 26 |

=== Medalists ===
| Event | Gold | Silver | Bronze |
|---|---|---|---|
| Men's singles | (Réunion) Réunion; Arnaud Génin | Mauritius; Jean Bernard Bongout | Mauritius; Julien Paul |
| Men's singles | (Réunion) Réunion; Arnaud Génin | Mauritius; Jean Bernard Bongout | Mauritius; Melvin Appiah |
| Men's doubles | Mauritius; Aatish Lubah; Julien Paul | (Réunion) Réunion; Arnaud Génin; Didier Nourry | (Réunion) Réunion; Loïc Bertil; Xavier Chan Fung Ting |
| Men's doubles | Mauritius; Aatish Lubah; Julien Paul | (Réunion) Réunion; Arnaud Génin; Didier Nourry | Seychelles; Kervin Ghislain; Jie Luo |
| Men's team | Mauritius; Julien Paul; Jean Bernard Bongout; Aatish Lubah; Christopher Paul; Tejraj Pultoo | (Réunion) Réunion; Arnaud Génin; Didier Nourry; Loïc Bertil; Xavier Chan Fung Ting; Gregory Grondin; Aaron Assing | Maldives; Mohamed Ajfan Rasheed; Ahmed Nibal; Nasheeu Sharafuddeen; Ibrahim Shamiu; Nashfan Mohamed |
| Women's singles | Maldives; Aminath Nabeeha Abdul Razzaq | Seychelles; Allisen Camille | Mauritius; Aurélie Allet |
| Women's singles | Maldives; Aminath Nabeeha Abdul Razzaq | Seychelles; Allisen Camille | Mauritius; Kobita Dookhee |
| Women's doubles | Mauritius; Aurélie Allet; Kobita Dookhee | Maldives; Fathimath Nabaaha Abdul Razzaq; Aminath Nabeeha Abdul Razzaq | Seychelles; Allisen Camille; Danielle Jupiter |
| Women's doubles | Mauritius; Aurélie Allet; Kobita Dookhee | Maldives; Fathimath Nabaaha Abdul Razzaq; Aminath Nabeeha Abdul Razzaq | Mauritius; Lorna Bodha; Jemimah Leung For Sang |
| Women's team | Mauritius; Aurélie Allet; Kobita Dookhee; Lorna Bodha; Jemimah Leung For Sang; Ganesha Mungrah | (Réunion) Réunion; Mathilde Lepetit; Mélodie Parrot; Loïse Law Kwai; Audrey Lebon; Diéla Perianayagom; Isabelle Lai Cheung Kit | Maldives; Fathimath Nabaaha Abdul Razzaq; Aminath Nabeeha Abdul Razzaq; Neela Najeeb; Maisa Fathuhulla Ismail; Moosa Aminath Shahurunaz; Aminath Ahmed Didi |
| Mixed doubles | Mauritius; Julien Paul; Aurélie Allet | Mauritius; Jean Bernard Bongout; Jemimah Leung For Sang | Maldives; Mohamed Ajfan Rasheed; Maisa Fathuhulla Ismail |
| Mixed doubles | Mauritius; Julien Paul; Aurélie Allet | Mauritius; Jean Bernard Bongout; Jemimah Leung For Sang | (Réunion) Réunion; Arnaud Génin; Mélodie Parrot |

== Individual results ==
=== Men's singles ===
==== Finals ====
Semi-finals
(Mauritius) Julien Paul | 19 | 7
(Réunion) Arnaud Génin | 21 | 21
(Mauritius) Melvin Appiah | 10 | 17
(Mauritius) Jean Bernard Bongout | 21 | 21

Final
(Réunion) Arnaud Génin | 21 | 21
(Mauritius) Jean Bernard Bongout | 19 | 14

==== Section 1 ====
First round
(Madagascar) Hery Zo Rakotoherinivo | 16 | 18
(Maldives) Ibrahim Shamiu | 21 | 21

Second round
(Mauritius) Julien Paul | 21 | 21
(Réunion) Gregory Grondin | 9 | 8
(Seychelles) Jie Luo | 21 | 21 | 21
(Maldives) Ibrahim Shamiu | 23 | 16 | 10

Quarter-finals
(Mauritius) Julien Paul | 21 | 21
(Seychelles) Jie Luo | 10 | 8

==== Section 2 ====
First round
(Seychelles) Kervin Ghislain | 16 | 10
(Madagascar) Marc Haja Vonjinirina | 21 | 21

Second round
(Mauritius) Aatish Lubah | 21 | 21
(Maldives) Mohamed Aakif | 6 | 4
(Réunion) Arnaud Génin | 21 | 21
(Madagascar) Marc Haja Vonjinirina | 8 | 10

Quarter-finals
(Mauritius) Aatish Lubah | 14 | 14
(Réunion) Arnaud Génin | 21 | 21

==== Section 3 ====
First round
(Seychelles) Aaron Malcouzane | 9 | 6
(Réunion) Loïc Bertil | 21 | 21

Second round
(Réunion) Loïc Bertil | 21 | 21
(Madagascar) Julio Keman Randriamalala | 12 | 6
(Maldives) Mohamed Ajfan Rasheed | 18 | 21 | 15
(Mauritius) Melvin Appiah | 21 | 18 | 21

Quarter-finals
(Réunion) Loïc Bertil | 9 | 16
(Mauritius) Melvin Appiah | 21 | 21

==== Section 4 ====
First round
(Madagascar) Tokinirina Razafimandimby | 21 | 21
(Maldives) Ahmed Nibal | 18 | 19

Second round
(Madagascar) Tokinirina Razafimandimby | 17 | 21 | 15
(Réunion) Aaron Assing | 21 | 15 | 21
(Seychelles) Jakim Renaud | 7 | 17
(Mauritius) Jean Bernard Bongout | 21 | 21

Quarter-finals
(Réunion) Aaron Assing | 17 | 14
(Mauritius) Jean Bernard Bongout | 21 | 21

=== Women's singles ===
==== Finals ====
Semi-finals
(Mauritius) Aurélie Allet | 16 | 16
(Maldives) Aminath Nabeeha Abdul Razzaq | 21 | 21
(Seychelles) Allisen Camille | 21 | 22
(Mauritius) Kobita Dookhee | 14 | 20

Final
(Maldives) Aminath Nabeeha Abdul Razzaq | 21 | 21
(Mauritius) Allisen Camille | 14 | 10

==== Section 1 ====
First round

Second round
(Mauritius) Aurélie Allet | 21 | 21
(Madagascar) Balika Voahanginirina | 5 | 6
(Maldives) Neela Najeeb | 17 | 21 | 21
(Réunion) Diéla Perianayagom | 21 | 16 | 13

Quarter-finals
(Mauritius) Aurélie Allet | 22 | 17 | 25
(Maldives) Neela Najeeb | 20 | 21 | 23

==== Section 2 ====
First round
(Réunion) Mathilde Lepetit | 21 | 21
(Madagascar) Mamisoa Razafimamonjiarison | 11 | 10

Second round
(Mauritius) Jemimah Leung For Sang | 15 | 19
(Maldives) Aminath Nabeeha Abdul Razzaq | 21 | 21
(Seychelles) Xiang Luo | 7 | 3
(Réunion) Mathilde Lepetit | 21 | 21

Quarter-finals
(Maldives) Aminath Nabeeha Abdul Razzaq | 21 | 21
(Réunion) Mathilde Lepetit | 18 | 17

==== Section 3 ====
First round
(Maldives) Moosa Aminath Shahurunaz | 18 | 19
(Seychelles) Allisen Camille | 21 | 21

Second round
(Seychelles) Allisen Camille | 21 | 21
(Madagascar) Asminah Razafiarimalala | 6 | 7
(Réunion) Mélodie Parrot | 21 | 21
(Mauritius) Lorna Bodha | 17 | 17

Quarter-finals
(Seychelles) Allisen Camille | 21 | 18 | 21
(Réunion) Mélodie Parrot | 19 | 21 | 17

==== Section 4 ====
First round
(Madagascar) Soaniaina Razanamaly | 21 | 11
(Mauritius) Kobita Dookhee | 23 | 21

Second round
(Mauritius) Kobita Dookhee | 21 | 21
(Réunion) Loïse Law Kwai | 16 | 13
(Seychelles) Danielle Jupiter | 12 | 9
(Maldives) Fathimath Nabaaha Abdul Razzaq | 21 | 21

Quarter-finals
(Mauritius) Kobita Dookhee | 21 | 19 | 21
(Maldives) Fathimath Nabaaha Abdul Razzaq | 18 | 21 | 19

=== Men's doubles ===
Round of 16
(Réunion) Loïc Bertil (Réunion) Xavier Chan Fung Ting | 16 | 21 | 21
(Maldives) Nashfan Mohamed (Maldives) Nasheeu Sharafuddeen | 21 | 14 | 15
(Mauritius) Melvin Appiah (Mauritius) Christopher Paul | 21 | 21
(Madagascar) Julio Keman Randriamalala (Madagascar) Tokinirina Razafimandimby | 14 | 7

Quarterfinals
(Mauritius) Aatish Lubah (Mauritius) Julien Paul | 21 | 21
(Seychelles) Steve Malcouzanne (Seychelles) Jakim Renaud | 8 | 12
(Madagascar) Marc Haja Vonjinirina (Madagascar) Ludovic Manja Ny Riana | 13 | 18
(Réunion) Loïc Bertil (Réunion) Xavier Chan Fung Ting | 21 | 21
(Mauritius) Melvin Appiah (Mauritius) Christopher Paul | 14 | 21 | 16
(Réunion) Arnaud Génin (Réunion) Didier Nourry | 21 | 14 | 21
(Maldives) Mohamed Ajfan Rasheed (Maldives) Ibrahim Shamiu | 16 | 21 | 13
(Seychelles) Kervin Ghislain (Seychelles) Jie Luo | 21 | 17 | 21

Semifinals
(Mauritius) Aatish Lubah (Mauritius) Julien Paul | 21 | 21
(Réunion) Loïc Bertil (Réunion) Xavier Chan Fung Ting | 12 | 12
(Réunion) Arnaud Génin (Réunion) Didier Nourry | 21 | 21
(Seychelles) Kervin Ghislain (Seychelles) Jie Luo | 18 | 14

Finals
(Mauritius) Aatish Lubah (Mauritius) Julien Paul | 21 | 21
(Réunion) Arnaud Génin (Réunion) Didier Nourry | 12 | 18

=== Women's doubles ===
Round of 16
(Madagascar) Mamisoa Razafimamonjiarison (Madagascar) Soaniaina Razanamaly | 12 | 18
(Maldives) Maisa Fathuhulla Ismail (Maldives) Neela Najeeb | 21 | 21

Quarterfinals
(Maldives) Fathimath Nabaaha Abdul Razzaq (Maldives) Aminath Nabeeha Abdul Razzaq | 21 | 21
(Madagascar) Asminah Razafiarimalala (Madagascar) Balika Voahanginirina | 7 | 7
(Réunion) Audrey Lebon (Réunion) Mathilde Lepetit | 21 | 19 | 17
(Mauritius) Lorna Bodha (Mauritius) Jemimah Leung For Sang | 10 | 21 | 21
(Maldives) Maisa Fathuhulla Ismail (Maldives) Neela Najeeb | 17 | 16
(Seychelles) Allisen Camille (Seychelles) Danielle Jupiter | 21 | 21
(Réunion) Mélodie Parrot (Réunion) Diéla Perianayagom | 15 | 12
(Mauritius) Aurélie Allet (Mauritius) Kobita Dookhee | 21 | 21

Semifinals
(Maldives) Fathimath Nabaaha Abdul Razzaq (Maldives) Aminath Nabeeha Abdul Razzaq | 21 | 21
(Mauritius) Lorna Bodha (Mauritius) Jemimah Leung For Sang | 12 | 15
(Seychelles) Allisen Camille (Seychelles) Danielle Jupiter | 8 | 13
(Mauritius) Aurélie Allet (Mauritius) Kobita Dookhee | 21 | 21

Finals
(Maldives) Fathimath Nabaaha Abdul Razzaq (Maldives) Aminath Nabeeha Abdul Razzaq | 18 | 21
(Mauritius) Aurélie Allet (Mauritius) Kobita Dookhee | 21 | 23

=== Mixed doubles ===
==== Finals ====
Semi-finals
(Maldives) Mohamed Ajfan Rasheed (Maldives) Maisa Fathuhulla Ismail | 17 | 21 | 14
(Mauritius) Jean Bernard Bongout (Mauritius) Jemimah Leung For Sang | 21 | 18 | 21
(Réunion) Arnaud Génin (Réunion) Mélodie Parrot | 13 | 23
(Mauritius) Julien Paul (Mauritius) Aurélie Allet | 21 | 25

Final
(Mauritius) Jean Bernard Bongout (Mauritius) Jemimah Leung For Sang | 20 | 14
(Mauritius) Julien Paul (Mauritius) Aurélie Allet | 22 | 21

==== Section 1 ====
First round

Second round
(Mauritius) Tejraj Pultoo (Mauritius) Kobita Dookhee | 21 | 21
(Madagascar) Julio Keman Randriamalala (Madagascar) Balika Voahanginirina | 13 | 11
(Maldives) Mohamed Ajfan Rasheed (Maldives) Maisa Fathuhulla Ismail | 21 | 21
(Réunion) Xavier Chan Fung Ting (Réunion) Loïse Law Kwai | 12 | 15

Quarter-finals
(Mauritius) Tejraj Pultoo (Mauritius) Kobita Dookhee | 17 | 21 | 19
(Maldives) Mohamed Ajfan Rasheed (Maldives) Maisa Fathuhulla Ismail | 21 | 10 | 21

==== Section 2 ====
First round
(Madagascar) Marc Haja Vonjinirina (Madagascar) Soaniaina Razanamaly | 21 | 21
(Seychelles) Kervin Ghislain (Seychelles) Danielle Jupiter | 15 | 19

Second round
(Mauritius) Jean Bernard Bongout (Mauritius) Jemimah Leung For Sang | 21 | 13 | 21
(Maldives) Nasheeu Sharafuddeen (Maldives) Neela Najeeb | 16 | 21 | 14
(Réunion) Aaron Assing (Réunion) Audrey Lebon | 22 | 21
(Madagascar) Marc Haja Vonjinirina (Madagascar) Soaniaina Razanamaly | 20 | 18

Quarter-finals
(Mauritius) Jean Bernard Bongout (Mauritius) Jemimah Leung For Sang | 16 | 21 | 21
(Réunion) Aaron Assing (Réunion) Audrey Lebon | 21 | 10 | 10

==== Section 3 ====
First round
(Réunion) Arnaud Génin (Réunion) Mélodie Parrot | 21 | 21
(Maldives) Nashfan Mohamed (Maldives) Moosa Aminath Shahurunaz | 11 | 11

Second round
(Réunion) Arnaud Génin (Réunion) Mélodie Parrot | 21 | 21
(Seychelles) Irvin Bonte (Seychelles) Xiang Luo | 4 | 6
(Madagascar) Tokinirina Razafimandimby (Madagascar) Mamisoa Razafimamonjiarison | 14 | 13
(Mauritius) Christopher Paul (Mauritius) Lorna Bodha | 21 | 21

Quarter-finals
(Réunion) Arnaud Génin (Réunion) Mélodie Parrot | 21 | 21
(Mauritius) Christopher Paul (Mauritius) Lorna Bodha | 17 | 15

==== Section 4 ====
First round
(Seychelles) Jie Luo (Seychelles) Allisen Camille | 21 | 21
(Madagascar) Hery Zo Rakotoherinivo (Madagascar) Asminah Razafiarimalala | 16 | 11

Second round
(Seychelles) Jie Luo (Seychelles) Allisen Camille | 21 | 21
(Maldives) Ibrahim Shamiu (Maldives) Aminath Ahmed Didi | 6 | 13
(Réunion) Loïc Bertil (Réunion) Isabelle Lai Cheung Kit | 7 | 9
(Mauritius) Julien Paul (Mauritius) Aurélie Allet | 21 | 21

Quarter-finals
(Seychelles) Jie Luo (Seychelles) Allisen Camille | 12 | 14
(Mauritius) Julien Paul (Mauritius) Aurélie Allet | 21 | 21

== Team results ==
=== Men's team ===
==== Mauritius vs Madagascar ====
Mauritius
5
National Badminton Center
20 July 2019

Madagascar
0

| | | | 1 | 2 | 3 |
|---|---|---|---|---|---|
| 1 | (Mauritius) (Madagascar) | Julien Paul; Marc Haja Vonjinirina | 21; 7 | 21; 12 |
| 2 | (Mauritius) (Madagascar) | Jean Bernard Bongout; Julio Keman Randriamalala | 21; 10 | 21; 15 |
| 3 | (Mauritius) (Madagascar) | Aatish Lubah; Ludovic Manja Ny Riana | 21; 8 | 21; 10 |
| 4 | (Mauritius) (Madagascar) | Melvin Appiah / Christopher Paul; Marc Haja Vonjinirina / Ludovic Manja Ny Riana | 21; 11 | 21; 19 |
| 5 | (Mauritius) (Madagascar) | Jean Bernard Bongout / Tejraj Pultoo; Julio Keman Randriamalala / Tokinirina Razafimandimby | 21; 12 | 21; 12 |

==== Réunion vs Seychelles ====
Réunion
3
National Badminton Center
20 July 2019

Seychelles
2

| | | | 1 | 2 | 3 |
|---|---|---|---|---|---|
| 1 | (Réunion) (Seychelles) | Arnaud Génin; Jie Luo | 21; 13 | 21; 16 |
| 2 | (Réunion) (Seychelles) | Loïc Bertil; Kervin Ghislain | 21; 13 | 19; 21 | 16; 21 |
| 3 | (Réunion) (Seychelles) | Xavier Chan Fung Ting; Jakim Renaud | 17; 21 | 21; 11 | 21; 9 |
| 4 | (Réunion) (Seychelles) | Arnaud Génin / Didier Nourry; Steve Malcouzanne / Jie Luo | 21; 10 | 21; 17 |
| 5 | (Réunion) (Seychelles) | Xavier Chan Fung Ting / Loïc Bertil; Kervin Ghislain / Jakim Renaud | 19; 21 | 21; 13 | 17; 21 |

==== Réunion vs Maldives ====
Réunion
5
National Badminton Center
20 July 2019

Maldives
0

| | | | 1 | 2 | 3 |
|---|---|---|---|---|---|
| 1 | (Réunion) (Maldives) | Arnaud Génin; Mohamed Ajfan Rasheed | 21; 18 | 21; 7 |
| 2 | (Réunion) (Maldives) | Didier Nourry; Ahmed Nibal | 21; 17 | 21; 11 |
| 3 | (Réunion) (Maldives) | Loïc Bertil; Nasheeu Sharafuddeen | 21; 13 | 21; 9 |
| 4 | (Réunion) (Maldives) | Arnaud Génin / Didier Nourry; Nasheeu Sharafuddeen / Nashfan Mohamed | 21; 9 | 21; 19 |
| 5 | (Réunion) (Maldives) | Xavier Chan Fung Ting / Loïc Bertil; Mohamed Ajfan Rasheed / Ibrahim Shamiu | 21; 12 | 22; 24 | 21; 15 |

==== Maldives vs Mauritius ====
Maldives
1
National Badminton Center
20 July 2019

Mauritius
4

| | | | 1 | 2 | 3 |
|---|---|---|---|---|---|
| 1 | (Maldives) (Mauritius) | Mohamed Ajfan Rasheed; Julien Paul | 14; 21 | 21; 17 | 21; 18 |
| 2 | (Maldives) (Mauritius) | Ahmed Nibal; Jean Bernard Bongout | 13; 21 | 13; 21 |
| 3 | (Maldives) (Mauritius) | Nasheeu Sharafuddeen; Aatish Lubah | 12; 21 | 12; 21 |
| 4 | (Maldives) (Mauritius) | Nasheeu Sharafuddeen / Nashfan Mohamed; Julien Paul / Aatish Lubah | 12; 21 | 9; 21 |
| 5 | (Maldives) (Mauritius) | Mohamed Ajfan Rasheed / Ibrahim Shamiu; Melvin Appiah / Christopher Paul | 8; 21 | 21; 17 | 13; 21 |

==== Mauritius vs Seychelles ====
Mauritius
5
National Badminton Center
21 July 2019

Seychelles
0

| | | | 1 | 2 | 3 |
|---|---|---|---|---|---|
| 1 | (Mauritius) (Seychelles) | Julien Paul; Jie Luo | 21; 8 | 21; 4 |
| 2 | (Mauritius) (Seychelles) | Jean Bernard Bongout; Kervin Ghislain | 21; 13 | 21; 12 |
| 3 | (Mauritius) (Seychelles) | Aatish Lubah; Jakim Renaud | 21; 9 | 21; 7 |
| 4 | (Mauritius) (Seychelles) | Julien Paul / Aatish Lubah; Jie Luo / Kervin Ghislain | 21; 16 | 17; 21 | 21; 9 |
| 5 | (Mauritius) (Seychelles) | Melvin Appiah / Christopher Paul; Steve Malcouzanne / Jakim Renaud | 21; 18 | 21; 10 |

==== Réunion vs Madagascar ====
Réunion
5
National Badminton Center
21 July 2019

Madagascar
0

| | | | 1 | 2 | 3 |
|---|---|---|---|---|---|
| 1 | (Réunion) (Madagascar) | Arnaud Génin; Marc Haja Vonjinirina | 21; 11 | 21; 18 |
| 2 | (Réunion) (Madagascar) | Didier Nourry; Julio Keman Randriamalala | 21; 15 | 21; 11 |
| 3 | (Réunion) (Madagascar) | Loïc Bertil; Tokinirina Razafimandimby | 21; 9 | 21; 8 |
| 4 | (Réunion) (Madagascar) | Arnaud Génin / Xavier Chan Fung Ting; Marc Haja Vonjinirina / Ludovic Manja Ny Riana | 21; 19 | 21; 16 |
| 5 | (Réunion) (Madagascar) | Aaron Assing / Gregory Grondin; Julio Keman Randriamalala / Tokinirina Razafimandimby | 21; 14 | 15; 21 | 21; 9 |

==== Maldives vs Seychelles ====
Maldives
4
National Badminton Center
21 July 2019

Seychelles
1

| | | | 1 | 2 | 3 |
|---|---|---|---|---|---|
| 1 | (Maldives) (Seychelles) | Mohamed Ajfan Rasheed; Jie Luo | 18; 21 | 17; 21 |
| 2 | (Maldives) (Seychelles) | Ahmed Nibal; Kervin Ghislain | 21; 16 | 21; 17 |
| 3 | (Maldives) (Seychelles) | Nasheeu Sharafuddeen; Steve Malcouzanne | 21; 17 | 13; 21 | 21; 12 |
| 4 | (Maldives) (Seychelles) | Ibrahim Shamiu / Nashfan Mohamed; Jie Luo / Steve Malcouzanne | 27; 25 | 14; 21 | 21; 13 |
| 5 | (Maldives) (Seychelles) | Mohamed Ajfan Rasheed / Nasheeu Sharafuddeen; Kervin Ghislain / Jakim Renaud | 21; 16 | 21; 19 |

==== Madagascar vs Maldives ====
Madagascar
1
National Badminton Center
21 July 2019

Maldives
4

| | | | 1 | 2 | 3 |
|---|---|---|---|---|---|
| 1 | (Madagascar) (Maldives) | Marc Haja Vonjinirina; Mohamed Ajfan Rasheed | 8; 21 | 12; 21 |
| 2 | (Madagascar) (Maldives) | Julio Keman Randriamalala; Ahmed Nibal | 16; 21 | 21; 19 | 17; 21 |
| 3 | (Madagascar) (Maldives) | Ludovic Manja Ny Riana; Nasheeu Sharafuddeen | 16; 21 | 10; 21 |
| 4 | (Madagascar) (Maldives) | Marc Haja Vonjinirina / Ludovic Manja Ny Riana; Nasheeu Sharafuddeen / Nashfan Mohamed | 21; 14 | 21; 19 |
| 5 | (Madagascar) (Maldives) | Julio Keman Randriamalala / Tokinirina Razafimandimby; Mohamed Ajfan Rasheed / Ibrahim Shamiu | 14; 21 | 14; 21 |

==== Mauritius vs Réunion ====
Mauritius
5
National Badminton Center
22 July 2019

Réunion
0

| | | | 1 | 2 | 3 |
|---|---|---|---|---|---|
| 1 | (Mauritius) (Réunion) | Julien Paul; Arnaud Génin |
| 2 | (Mauritius) (Réunion) | Jean Bernard Bongout; Didier Nourry |
| 3 | (Mauritius) (Réunion) | Aatish Lubah; Loïc Bertil |
| 4 | (Mauritius) (Réunion) | Julien Paul / Aatish Lubah; Arnaud Génin / Didier Nourry |
| 5 | (Mauritius) (Réunion) | Melvin Appiah / Christopher Paul; Xavier Chan Fung Ting / Loïc Bertil |

==== Madagascar vs Seychelles ====
Madagascar
0
National Badminton Center
22 July 2019

Seychelles
5

| | | | 1 | 2 | 3 |
|---|---|---|---|---|---|
| 1 | (Madagascar) (Seychelles) | Marc Haja Vonjinirina; Jie Luo |
| 2 | (Madagascar) (Seychelles) | Julio Keman Randriamalala; Kervin Ghislain |
| 3 | (Madagascar) (Seychelles) | Tokinirina Razafimandimby; Jakim Renaud |
| 4 | (Madagascar) (Seychelles) | Marc Haja Vonjinirina / Ludovic Manja Ny Riana; Jie Luo / Steve Malcouzanne |
| 5 | (Madagascar) (Seychelles) | Julio Keman Randriamalala / Tokinirina Razafimandimby; Kervin Ghislain / Jakim Renaud |

=== Women's team ===
==== Réunion vs Maldives ====
Réunion
4
National Badminton Center
20 July 2019

Maldives
1

| | | | 1 | 2 | 3 |
|---|---|---|---|---|---|
| 1 | (Réunion) (Maldives) | Mathilde Lepetit; Fathimath Nabaaha Abdul Razzaq | 21; 16 | 21; 14 |
| 2 | (Réunion) (Maldives) | Mélodie Parrot; Neela Najeeb | 21; 17 | 21; 13 |
| 3 | (Réunion) (Maldives) | Diéla Perianayagom; Aminath Nabeeha Abdul Razzaq | 15; 21 | 12; 21 |
| 4 | (Réunion) (Maldives) | Audrey Lebon / Mathilde Lepetit; Neela Najeeb / Aminath Nabeeha Abdul Razzaq | 22; 20 | 15; 21 | 21; 17 |
| 5 | (Réunion) (Maldives) | Mélodie Parrot / Diéla Perianayagom; Fathimath Nabaaha Abdul Razzaq / Maisa Fathuhulla Ismail | 21; 19 | 17; 21 | 21; 15 |

==== Mauritius vs Madagascar ====
Mauritius
5
National Badminton Center
20 July 2019

Madagascar
0

| | | | 1 | 2 | 3 |
|---|---|---|---|---|---|
| 1 | (Mauritius) (Madagascar) | Aurélie Allet; Soaniaina Razanamaly | 21; 11 | 21; 10 |
| 2 | (Mauritius) (Madagascar) | Lorna Bodha; Mamisoa Razafimamonjiarison | 21; 6 | 21; 10 |
| 3 | (Mauritius) (Madagascar) | Kobita Dookhee; Asminah Razafiarimalala | 21; 8 | 21; 6 |
| 4 | (Mauritius) (Madagascar) | Aurélie Allet / Kobita Dookhee; Mamisoa Razafimamonjiarison / Soaniaina Razanamaly | 21; 5 | 21; 10 |
| 5 | (Mauritius) (Madagascar) | Jemimah Leung For Sang / Ganesha Mungrah; Asminah Razafiarimalala / Balika Voahanginirina | 21; 7 | 21; 7 |

==== Mauritius vs Maldives ====
Mauritius
2
National Badminton Center
20 July 2019

Maldives
3

| | | | 1 | 2 | 3 |
|---|---|---|---|---|---|
| 1 | (Mauritius) (Maldives) | Aurélie Allet; Fathimath Nabaaha Abdul Razzaq | 18; 21 | 17; 21 |
| 2 | (Mauritius) (Maldives) | Lorna Bodha; Neela Najeeb | 21; 18 | 14; 21 | 15; 21 |
| 3 | (Mauritius) (Maldives) | Kobita Dookhee; Aminath Nabeeha Abdul Razzaq | 16; 21 | 21; 14 | 21; 17 |
| 4 | (Mauritius) (Maldives) | Aurélie Allet / Kobita Dookhee; Neela Najeeb / Aminath Nabeeha Abdul Razzaq | 21; 17 | 17; 21 | 21; 10 |
| 5 | (Mauritius) (Maldives) | Jemimah Leung For Sang / Lorna Bodha; Fathimath Nabaaha Abdul Razzaq / Maisa Fathuhulla Ismail | 12; 21 | 15; 21 |

==== Maldives vs Madagascar ====
Maldives
5
National Badminton Center
21 July 2019

Madagascar
0

| | | | 1 | 2 | 3 |
|---|---|---|---|---|---|
| 1 | (Maldives) (Madagascar) | Fathimath Nabaaha Abdul Razzaq; Soaniaina Razanamaly | 21; 10 | 21; 14 |
| 2 | (Maldives) (Madagascar) | Neela Najeeb; Mamisoa Razafimamonjiarison | 21; 14 | 21; 9 |
| 3 | (Maldives) (Madagascar) | Aminath Nabeeha Abdul Razzaq; Asminah Razafiarimalala | 21; 10 | 21; 7 |
| 4 | (Maldives) (Madagascar) | Fathimath Nabaaha Abdul Razzaq / Aminath Nabeeha Abdul Razzaq; Mamisoa Razafimamonjiarison / Soaniaina Razanamaly | 21; 17 | 21; 14 |
| 5 | (Maldives) (Madagascar) | Neela Najeeb / Maisa Fathuhulla Ismail; Asminah Razafiarimalala / Balika Voahanginirina | 21; 9 | 21; 5 |

==== Réunion vs Madagascar ====
Réunion
5
National Badminton Center
21 July 2019

Madagascar
0

| | | | 1 | 2 | 3 |
|---|---|---|---|---|---|
| 1 | (Réunion) (Madagascar) | Mathilde Lepetit; Soaniaina Razanamaly | 21; 14 | 16; 21 | 23; 21 |
| 2 | (Réunion) (Madagascar) | Mélodie Parrot; Mamisoa Razafimamonjiarison | 21; 14 | 21; 10 |
| 3 | (Réunion) (Madagascar) | Loïse Law Kwai; Balika Voahanginirina | 21; 8 | 21; 6 |
| 4 | (Réunion) (Madagascar) | Audrey Lebon / Mathilde Lepetit; Soaniaina Razanamaly / Mamisoa Razafimamonjiarison | 21; 8 | 21; 11 |
| 5 | (Réunion) (Madagascar) | Mélodie Parrot / Diéla Perianayagom; Asminah Razafiarimalala / Balika Voahanginirina | 21; 10 | 21; 7 |

==== Réunion vs Maldives ====
Réunion
1
National Badminton Center
22 July 2019

Mauritius
4

| | | | 1 | 2 | 3 |
|---|---|---|---|---|---|
| 1 | (Réunion) (Mauritius) | Mathilde Lepetit; Aurélie Allet |
| 2 | (Réunion) (Mauritius) | Mélodie Parrot; Lorna Bodha |
| 3 | (Réunion) (Mauritius) | Diéla Perianayagom; Kobita Dookhee |
| 4 | (Réunion) (Mauritius) | Audrey Lebon / Mathilde Lepetit; Aurélie Allet / Kobita Dookhee |
| 5 | (Réunion) (Mauritius) | Mélodie Parrot / Diéla Perianayagom; Jemimah Leung For Sang / Ganesha Mungrah |

== Participants ==
| Country | Men's | Women's | Total athletes |
|---|---|---|---|
| Madagascar (MAD) | 1. Marc Haja Vonjinirina; 2. Julio Keman Randriamalala; 3. Ludovic Manja Ny Riana; 4. Tokinirina Razafimandimby; 5. Hery Zo Rakotoherinivo | 1. Soaniaina Razanamaly; 2. Mamisoa Razafimamonjiarison; 3. Balika Voahanginirina; 4. Asminah Razafiarimalala | 9 |
| Maldives (MDV) | 1. Mohamed Ajfan Rasheed; 2. Ahmed Nibal; 3. Nasheeu Sharafuddeen; 4. Ibrahim Shamiu; 5. Nashfan Mohamed | 1. Fathimath Nabaaha Abdul Razzaq; 2. Aminath Nabeeha Abdul Razzaq; 3. Neela Najeeb; 4. Maisa Fathuhulla Ismail; 5. Moosa Aminath Shahurunaz; 6. Aminath Ahmed Didi | 11 |
| Mauritius (MRI) | 1. Julien Paul; 2. Jean Bernard Bongout; 3. Aatish Lubah; 4. Christopher Paul; 5. Tejraj Pultoo | 1. Aurélie Allet; 2. Kobita Dookhee; 3. Lorna Bodha; 4. Jemimah Leung For Sang; 5. Ganesha Mungrah | 10 |
| Réunion (REU) | 1. Arnaud Génin; 2. Didier Nourry; 3. Loïc Bertil; 4. Xavier Chan Fung Ting; 5. Gregory Grondin; 6. Aaron Assing | 1. Mathilde Lepetit; 2. Mélodie Parrot; 3. Loïse Law Kwai; 4. Audrey Lebon; 5. Diéla Perianayagom; 6. Isabelle Lai Cheung Kit | 12 |
| Seychelles (SEY) | 1. Jie Luo; 2. Kervin Ghislain; 3. Steve Malcouzanne; 4. Jakim Renaud; 5. Irvin Bonte | 1. Allisen Camille; 2. Danielle Jupiter; 3. Xiang Luo | 8 |
