= Eritrea national badminton team =

National badminton team representing Eritrea

Eritrea
- Association: Eritrean National Badminton Federation (ENBF)
- Confederation: BCA (Africa)
- President: Kahsay Negusse

BWF ranking
- Current ranking: 126 (2 April 2024)
- Highest ranking: 120 (1 October 2019)

African Mixed Team Championships
- Appearances: 1 (first in 2004)
- Best result: Group stage

The Eritrea national badminton team (Tigrinya: ሃገራዊት ጋንታ ባድሚንተን ኤርትራ) represents Eritrea in international badminton team competitions. The team is controlled by the Eritrean National Badminton Federation, the governing body for badminton in Eritrea. The national team debuted in the 2004 African Badminton Championships after the formation of the national federation in 2004.

== History ==
=== Mixed team ===
Eritrea competed in the 2004 African Badminton Championships team event. The team finished on the bottom of Group A after losing 5–0 to all of their opponents. In 2019, Eritrea made their badminton debut at the African Games. The team were eliminated in the group stages after losing 5–0 to Egypt and South Africa.

== Competitive record ==
=== Thomas Cup ===
Year	Round	Pos
1949 to 1992	Part of Ethiopia	
1994 to 2024	Did not enter	
2026	To be determined	
2028	To be determined	
2030	To be determined	

=== Uber Cup ===
Year	Round	Pos
1957 to 1992	Part of Ethiopia	
1994 to 2024	Did not enter	
2026	To be determined	
2028	To be determined	
2030	To be determined	

=== Sudirman Cup ===
Year	Round	Pos
1989	Part of Ethiopia	
1991	Part of Ethiopia	
1993 to 2023	Did not enter	
2025	To be determined	
2027	To be determined	
2029	To be determined	

=== African Games ===
==== Mixed team ====
Year	Round	Pos
2003	Did not enter	
2007	Did not enter	
2011	Did not enter	
2015	Did not enter	
2019	Group stage	
2027	TBD	

=== African Team Championships ===
==== Men's team ====
Year	Round	Pos
1979 to 1988	Part of Ethiopia	
2016 to 2024	Did not enter	
2026	To be determined	
2028	To be determined	
2030	To be determined	

==== Women's team ====
Year	Round	Pos
1979 to 1988	Part of Ethiopia	
2016 to 2024	Did not enter	
2026	To be determined	
2028	To be determined	
2030	To be determined	

==== Mixed team ====
Year	Round	Pos
1980 to 1992	Part of Ethiopia	
1994 to 2002	Did not enter	
2004	Group stage	12th
2006	Did not enter	
2007	Did not enter	
2009	Did not enter	
2011	Did not enter	
2013	Did not enter	
2014	Did not enter	
2017	Did not enter	
2019	Did not enter	
2021	Did not enter	
2023	Did not enter	
2025	To be determined	
2027	To be determined	
2029	To be determined	

**Red border color indicates tournament was held on home soil.

== Junior competitive record ==
=== Suhandinata Cup ===
Year	Round	Pos
2000 to 2024	Did not enter	
2025	To be determined	

=== African Youth Games ===
==== Men's team ====
Year	Round	Pos
2018	Did not enter	

==== Women's team ====
Year	Round	Pos
2018	Did not enter	

==== Mixed team ====
Year	Round	Pos
2014	Did not enter	

=== African Junior Team Championships ===
==== Mixed team ====
Year	Round	Pos
1979 to 1988	Part of Ethiopia	
1993 to 2022	Did not enter	
2024	To be determined	

**Red border color indicates tournament was held on home soil.

== Players ==
=== Current squad ===
As of 2 January 2024

==== Men's team ====
Name	DoB/Age	Ranking of event		
Name	DoB/Age	MS	MD	XD
Filimon Samsom	7 February 1990 (age 36)	-	-	-
Leykun Semere	29 January 1994 (age 32)	-	-	-

==== Women's team ====
Name	DoB/Age	Ranking of event		
Name	DoB/Age	WS	WD	XD
Kisanet Heyelom	27 June 2000 (age 25)	-	-	-
Yodit Okbamichael	11 June 1988 (age 37)	-	-	-
