= 2016 Badminton Asia Team Championships =

Badminton championships

Tournament details
- Dates: 15–21 February 2016
- Edition: 1
- Venue: GMC Balayogi Indoor Stadium
- Location: Hyderabad, India

Champions
- Men's teams: Indonesia
- Women's teams: China

The 2016 Badminton Asia Team Championships was the first ever edition of Badminton Asia Team Championships, held at the GMC Balayogi Indoor Stadium in Hyderabad, India, on 15–21 February 2016 and were organised by Badminton Asia Confederation. The tournament also served as the Asian qualifiers for the 2016 Thomas & Uber Cup.

== Background ==
The 2016 Badminton Asia Team Championships officially crowned the best male and female national badminton teams in Asia and at the same time worked as the Asian qualification event towards the 2016 Thomas & Uber Cup finals. 26 teams, consisting of 14 men's teams and 12 women's teams entered the tournament.

=== Competition format ===
The competition begins with a group stage: all participating teams are divided into four groups of two or three teams each. Each team plays each other once, with the top two teams advancing to the knockout stage. A match is won by the team that first wins three games. The eight teams that qualify will be drawn and compete in a knockout format until the final.

Tie-breaker

Team ranking within a group is determined based on the following criteria: number of wins; match difference; game difference; and points difference. If two teams are tied after a criterion is applied, the winner of the match between the two teams will be ranked higher. A draw will be held to determine ranking if there are still teams tied after all criteria are applied.

=== Hosting ===
In January 2016, Hyderabad was selected over Bangkok in the bidding process for the first ever Badminton Asia Team Championships.

== Schedule ==
Day, Date	Time	Phase
Monday, 15 February	11:30	Group Stage
Monday, 15 February	16:30	Group Stage
Tuesday, 16 February	11:30	Group Stage
Tuesday, 16 February	16:30	Group Stage
Wednesday, 17 February	11:30	Group Stage
Wednesday, 17 February	16:30	Group Stage
Thursday, 18 February	11:30	Group Stage
Thursday, 18 February	16:30	Group Stage
Friday, 19 February	11:30	Quarter-finals
Friday, 19 February	16:30	Quarter-finals
Saturday, 20 February	11:30	Semi-finals
Saturday, 20 February	16:30	Semi-finals
Sunday, 21 February	11:30	Finals
Sunday, 21 February	16:30	Finals
Note: All times are in Indian Standard Time (UTC+05:30)

== Teams ==
The tournament will feature 14 teams competing in the men's category and 12 teams in the women's category.

Nation	Men's	Women's	Nation	Men's	Women's
China	Yes	Yes	Malaysia	Yes	Yes
Chinese Taipei	Yes	Yes	Maldives	Yes	Yes
Hong Kong	Yes	Yes	Nepal	Yes	—N/a
India	Yes	Yes	Philippines	Yes	—N/a
Indonesia	Yes	Yes	Singapore	Yes	Yes
Japan	Yes	Yes	South Korea	Yes	Yes
Sri Lanka	Yes	Yes	Thailand	Yes	Yes

== Draw ==
=== Seedings ===
The seeding were as follows:

- Men's team
1. South Korea
2. Indonesia
3. Japan
4. India
- Women's team
1. China
2. Japan
3. South Korea
4. Thailand

=== Drawn groups ===
The draw was held on 2 February 2016, at the tournament venue. The men's team group stage consisted of two groups with three teams and two groups with four teams. The women's team group stage consisted of four groups each with three teams.

- Men's team

Group A	Group B	Group C	Group D
India (4, H); China; Singapore	Japan (3); Malaysia; Nepal; Sri Lanka	Indonesia (2); Maldives; Chinese Taipei; Thailand	South Korea (1); Hong Kong; Philippines

- Women's team

Group A	Group B	Group C	Group D
China (1); Malaysia; Hong Kong	Thailand (4); Chinese Taipei; Sri Lanka	South Korea (3); Indonesia; Maldives	Japan (1); India; Singapore

== Medal summary ==
=== Medal table ===
* Host nation (India)

Rank	Nation	Gold	Silver	Bronze	Total
1	China	1	0	0	1
1	Indonesia	1	0	0	1
3	Japan	0	2	0	2
4	South Korea	0	0	2	2
5	India*	0	0	1	1
5	Thailand	0	0	1	1
Totals (6 entries)		2	2	4	8

=== Medalists ===
Event	Gold	Silver	Bronze
Men's team	Indonesia; Angga Pratama; Anthony Sinisuka Ginting; Berry Angriawan; Hendra Setiawan; Ihsan Maulana Mustofa; Jonatan Christie; Mohammad Ahsan; Ricky Karanda Suwardi; Rian Agung Saputro; Tommy Sugiarto	Japan; Hiroyuki Endo; Hiroyuki Saeki; Keigo Sonoda; Kenichi Hayakawa; Kenta Nishimoto; Kento Momota; Ryota Taohata; Sho Sasaki; Takeshi Kamura; Takuma Ueda	South Korea; Choi Sol-gyu; Heo Kwang-hee; Jeon Hyeok-jin; Kim Gi-jung; Kim Jae-hwan; Kim Sa-rang; Ko Sung-hyun; Lee Dong-keun; Shin Baek-cheol; Son Wan-ho
Men's team	Indonesia; Angga Pratama; Anthony Sinisuka Ginting; Berry Angriawan; Hendra Setiawan; Ihsan Maulana Mustofa; Jonatan Christie; Mohammad Ahsan; Ricky Karanda Suwardi; Rian Agung Saputro; Tommy Sugiarto	Japan; Hiroyuki Endo; Hiroyuki Saeki; Keigo Sonoda; Kenichi Hayakawa; Kenta Nishimoto; Kento Momota; Ryota Taohata; Sho Sasaki; Takeshi Kamura; Takuma Ueda	India; Ajay Jayaram; Akshay Dewalkar; Chirag Shetty; Manu Attri; Pranav Chopra; Prannoy H. S. B. Sai Praneeth; Satwiksairaj Rankireddy; Srikanth Kidambi; B. Sumeeth Reddy
Women's team	China; Chen Yufei; He Bingjiao; Luo Ying; Luo Yu; Sun Yu; Tang Yuanting; Tian Qing; Wang Shixian; Yu Yang; Zhao Yunlei	Japan; Ayaka Takahashi; Kurumi Yonao; Mami Naito; Minatsu Mitani; Misaki Matsutomo; Naoko Fukuman; Nozomi Okuhara; Sayaka Sato; Shizuka Matsuo; Yui Hashimoto	South Korea; Bae Yeon-ju; Chang Ye-na; Go Ah-ra; Jung Kyung-eun; Kim Hyo-min; Lee Jang-mi; Lee So-hee; Shin Seung-chan; Sung Ji-hyun; Yoo Hae-won
Women's team	China; Chen Yufei; He Bingjiao; Luo Ying; Luo Yu; Sun Yu; Tang Yuanting; Tian Qing; Wang Shixian; Yu Yang; Zhao Yunlei	Japan; Ayaka Takahashi; Kurumi Yonao; Mami Naito; Minatsu Mitani; Misaki Matsutomo; Naoko Fukuman; Nozomi Okuhara; Sayaka Sato; Shizuka Matsuo; Yui Hashimoto	Thailand; Busanan Ongbamrungphan; Chayanit Chaladchalam; Jongkolphan Kititharakul; Phataimas Muenwong; Pornpawee Chochuwong; Porntip Buranaprasertsuk; Puttita Supajirakul; Ratchanok Intanon; Rawinda Prajongjai; Sapsiree Taerattanachai
