= 2004 Thomas & Uber Cups Preliminaries for Africa =

Tournament details
- Dates: 23–25 February 2004
- Venue: Pretoria Showgrounds
- Location: Pretoria, South Africa

The 2004 Thomas & Uber Cups Preliminaries for Africa were the African qualifiers for the 2004 Thomas & Uber Cup in Jakarta, Indonesia. The tournament was held at the Pretoria Showgrounds in Pretoria, South Africa. The tournament was held from 23 to 25 February 2004.

This was the first time a sole African qualifying zone was established, which granted African teams a quota in the final tournament. A total of 7 men's teams and 7 women's teams took part in the event. Hosts South Africa finished in first place in both men's and women's team events and directly qualified for the 2004 Thomas & Uber Cup.

== Squads ==
Men's team
Team	Players
Botswana	Harold Ndaba, Tebogo Ofentse, Kabelo Mosinyi
Mauritius	Stephan Beeharry, Vishal Sawaram, Eddy Clarisse, Kiran Baboolall
Nigeria	Ibrahim Adamu, Dotun Akinsanya, Edicha Ocholi, Ola Fagbemi, Abimbola Odejoke, Greg Okuonghae
South Africa	Chris Dednam, Johan Kleingeld, Stewart Carson, Dorian James
Swaziland	Nick Malaza, Musawenkhosi Mnisi, Sifiso Dlamini
Uganda	Abraham Wogute, Edwin Ekiring, Ibrahim Nyanzi, Ivan Karimunda
Zambia	Eli Mambwe, Juma Muwowo, Lucio Mambwe, Kaite Mubanga
Women's team
Team	Players
Botswana	Oarabile Mosinyi, Goabaone Segadimo
Mauritius	Amrita Sawaram, Shama Aboobakar, Marlyse Marquer, Karen Foo Kune
Nigeria	Grace Daniel, Susan Ideh, Kuburat Mumuni, Prisca Azuine
South Africa	Michelle Edwards, Chantal Botts, Annari Viljoen, Marika Daubern, Antoinette Uys
Swaziland	Dumisile Mkhatshwa, Hlobisile Kgomo, Thandeka Dlamini
Uganda	Fiona Ssozi, Fiona Nakaloma, Edith Wamalwa, Helen Luziika
Zambia	Ogar Siamupangila, Ngandwe Miyambo, Irene Chongo, Jean Mabiza

== Tournament ==
=== Draw ===
A total of 14 teams, that includes 7 men's teams and 7 women's teams competed in the qualification tournament. The tournament was played in a round robin format.

Men's team	Women's team
Botswana; Mauritius; Nigeria; South Africa; Swaziland; Uganda; Zambia	Botswana; Mauritius; Nigeria; South Africa; Swaziland; Uganda; Zambia

== Men's team ==
=== Round-robin ===
Pos	Team	Pld	W	L	MF	MA	MD	Pts	Qualification	South Africa	Nigeria	Mauritius	Uganda	Zambia	Botswana	Eswatini
1	South Africa	6	6	0	29	1	+28	6	2004 Thomas Cup	—	4–1	5–0	5–0	5–0	5–0	5–0
2	Nigeria	6	5	1	26	4	+22	5			—	5–0	5–0	5–0	5–0	5–0
3	Mauritius	6	4	2	18	12	+6	4				—	3–2	5–0	5–0	5–0
4	Uganda	6	3	3	17	13	+4	3					—	5–0	5–0	5–0
5	Zambia	6	2	4	8	22	−14	2						—	3–2	5–0
6	Botswana	6	1	5	7	23	−16	1							—	5–0
7	Swaziland	6	0	6	0	30	−30	0								—

Source: L'Express

== Women's team ==
=== Round-robin ===
Pos	Team	Pld	W	L	MF	MA	MD	Pts	Qualification	South Africa	Mauritius	Nigeria	Uganda	Zambia	Botswana	Eswatini
1	South Africa	6	6	0	30	0	+30	6	2004 Uber Cup	—	5–0	5–0	5–0	5–0	5–0	5–0
2	Mauritius	6	5	1	25	5	+20	5			—	5–0	5–0	5–0	5–0	5–0
3	Nigeria	6	4	2	20	10	+10	4				—	5–0	5–0	5–0	5–0
4	Uganda	6	3	3	15	15	0	3					—	5–0	5–0	5–0
5	Zambia	6	2	4	10	20	−10	2						—	5–0	5–0
6	Botswana	6	1	5	5	25	−20	1							—	5–0
7	Swaziland	6	0	6	0	30	−30	0								—

Source: L'Express
