= Seychelles national badminton team =

National badminton team representing Seychelles

Seychelles
- Association: Seychelles Badminton Association (SBA)
- Confederation: BCA (Africa)
- President: Michel Bau

BWF ranking
- Current ranking: 130 ▼6 (2 April 2024)
- Highest ranking: 44 (5 April 2012)

Sudirman Cup
- Appearances: 2 (first in 2011)
- Best result: Group stage

African Mixed Team Championships
- Appearances: 10 (first in 1992)
- Best result: Champions (2007)

African Men's Team Championships
- Appearances: 1 (first in 2018)
- Best result: Group stage

The Seychelles national badminton team (French: Équipe nationale des Seychelles de badminton; Seychellois Creole: Ekip nasyonal badminton Sesel) represents Seychelles in international badminton team competitions. The Seychellois team is controlled by the Seychelles Badminton Association. While badminton is not popular in Seychelles, the island nation has competed in the African Badminton Championships and have decent results over the years.

The national team won the African Badminton Championships mixed team event in 2007 and were runners-up two years later. The team were semifinalists in the 2013 and 2014 African Badminton Championships. The team also participated in the Sudirman Cup two times in 2011 and 2015 but were eliminated in the group stage.

The Seychelles team also participated in the Commonwealth Games.

== Competitive record ==
=== Thomas Cup ===
Year	Round	Pos
1949 to 1976	Part of the United Kingdom	
1979 to 2004	Did not enter	
2006	Did not qualify	
2008	Did not enter	
2010	Did not qualify	
2012	Did not enter	
2014	Did not enter	
2016	Did not enter	
2018	Did not qualify	
2020	Did not enter	
2022	Did not enter	
2024	Did not enter	
2026	Did not qualify	
2028	To be determined	
2030	To be determined	

=== Uber Cup ===
Year	Round	Pos
1957 to 1975	Part of the United Kingdom	
1978 to 2004	Did not enter	
2006	Did not qualify	
2008	Did not enter	
2010	Did not qualify	
2012	Did not enter	
2014	Did not enter	
2016	Did not enter	
2018	Did not enter	
2020	Did not enter	
2022	Did not enter	
2024	Did not enter	
2026	Did not enter	
2028	To be determined	
2030	To be determined	

=== Sudirman Cup ===
Year	Round	Pos
1989 to 2009	Did not enter	
2011	Group stage	33rd
2013	Did not enter	
2015	Group stage	35th
2017	Did not enter	
2019	Did not enter	
2021	Did not enter	
2023	Did not enter	
2025	To be determined	
2027	To be determined	
2029	To be determined	

=== Commonwealth Games ===
==== Men's team ====
Year	Round	Pos
1998	Did not enter	

==== Women's team ====
Year	Round	Pos
1998	Did not enter	

==== Mixed team ====
Year	Round	Pos
1978 to 1994	Did not enter	
2002	Group stage	
2006	Group stage	
2010	Group stage	
2014	Group stage	
2018	Disqualified	
2022	Did not enter	
2026	To be determined	

=== African Games ===
==== Mixed team ====
Year	Round	Pos
2003	Semi-finals	4th
2007	Semi-finals	3rd
2011	Semi-finals	4th
2015	Semi-finals	4th
2019	Did not enter	
2027	To be determined	

=== African Team Championships ===
==== Men's team ====
Year	Round	Pos
1979 to 2016	Did not enter	
2018	Group stage	
2020	Did not enter	
2022	Did not enter	
2024	Did not enter	
2026	Group stage	9th
2028	To be determined	
2030	To be determined	

==== Women's team ====
Year	Round	Pos
1979 to 2026	Did not enter	
2028	To be determined	
2030	To be determined	

==== Mixed team ====
Year	Round	Pos
1980 to 1988	Did not enter	
1992	Group stage	
1994	Did not enter	
1998	Did not enter	
2000	Fourth place	4th
2002	Fourth place	4th
2004	Semi-finals	4th
2006	Semi-finals	4th
2007	Champions	1st
2009	Runners-up	2nd
2011	Group stage	
2013	Semi-finals	4th
2014	Semi-finals	4th
2017	Did not enter	
2019	Did not enter	
2021	Did not enter	
2023	Did not enter	
2025	To be determined	
2027	To be determined	
2029	To be determined	

=== Indian Ocean Island Games ===
==== Men's team ====
Year	Round	Pos
1979	Fourth place	4th
1990	Third place	3rd
1993	Fourth place	4th
1998	Fourth place	4th
2003	Third place	3rd
2011	Runners-up	2nd
2015	Third place	3rd
2019	Fourth place	4th
2023	Group stage	
2027	To be determined	

==== Women's team ====
Year	Round	Pos
1979	Third place	3rd
1990	Fourth place	4th
1993	Third place	3rd
1998	Third place	3rd
2003	Runners-up	2nd
2011	Runners-up	2nd
2015	Runners-up	2nd
2019	Did not enter	
2023	Did not enter	
2027	To be determined	

==== Mixed team ====
Year	Round	Pos
1985	Fourth place	4th

**Red border color indicates tournament was held on home soil.

== Junior competitive record ==
=== Suhandinata Cup ===
Year	Round	Pos
2000	Did not enter	
2002	Did not enter	
2004	Did not enter	
2006	Did not enter	
2007	Did not enter	
2008	Did not enter	
2009	Did not enter	
2010	Did not enter	
2011	Did not enter	
2012	Did not enter	
2013	Did not enter	
2014	Did not enter	
2015	Did not enter	
2016	Did not enter	
2017	Did not enter	
2018	Did not enter	
2019	Did not enter	
2022	Did not enter	
2023	Did not enter	
2024	Did not enter	
2025	Did not enter	
2026	Withdrew	

=== Commonwealth Youth Games ===
==== Mixed team ====
Year	Round	Pos
2004	Did not enter	

=== African Youth Games ===
==== Men's team ====
Year	Round	Pos
2018	Did not enter	

==== Women's team ====
Year	Round	Pos
2018	Did not enter	

==== Mixed team ====
Year	Round	Pos
2014	Group stage	

=== African Junior Team Championships ===
==== Mixed team ====
Year	Round	Pos
1979	Did not enter	
1980	Did not enter	
1982	Did not enter	
1984	Did not enter	
1988	Did not enter	
1993	Did not enter	
1995	Did not enter	
1997	Did not enter	
1999	Did not enter	
2001	Fourth place	4th
2003	Did not enter	
2005	Group stage	
2007	Semi-finals	4th
2009	Did not enter	
2011	Did not enter	
2013	Group stage	
2016	Group stage	
2021	Did not enter	
2022	Did not enter	
2024	To be determined	

**Red border color indicates tournament was held on home soil.

== Players ==
=== Current squad ===
As of 2 January 2024

==== Men's team ====
Name	DoB/Age	Ranking of event		
Name	DoB/Age	MS	MD	XD
Aaron Malcouzane	4 May 2003 (age 23)	1057	534	-
Jie Luo	26 March 2000 (age 26)	-	717	740
Jakim Renaud	25 March 2001 (age 25)	1057	534	-
Ryan Boniface	30 April 2003 (age 23)	1057	717	-

==== Women's team ====
Name	DoB/Age	Ranking of event		
Name	DoB/Age	WS	WD	XD
Allisen Camille	26 June 1992 (age 34)	-	-	740
Xiang Luo	9 June 2002 (age 24)	-	-	-
Sejaljayesh Shah	7 January 1994 (age 32)	-	-	-
Chlorie Cadeau	17 March 1996 (age 30)	-	-	-
