= Eswatini national badminton team =

National badminton team representing Eswatini

Eswatini
- Association: Eswatini Badminton Association (EBA)
- Confederation: BCA (Africa)
- President: Panuel Gwebu

BWF ranking
- Current ranking: Unranked (2 April 2024)
- Highest ranking: Unranked

African Mixed Team Championships
- Appearances: 1 (first in 2004)
- Best result: Group stage

The Eswatini national badminton team (Swazi: Licembu lebhedminton laseSwatini) represents Eswatini, formerly known as Swaziland, in international badminton team competitions. It is controlled by the Eswatini Badminton Association.

The Eswatini junior badminton team competed in the African Junior Badminton Championships mixed team event in 2007, where the team finished in 7th place. As of 2022, the national team has been inactive and have not competed in any tournaments since 2007.

== History ==
Badminton was first introduced to Eswatini in the early 1990s. At the time, the sport was played in schools in Lobamba, Manzini, Ntfonjeni and Kwaluseni. The small popularity of the sport lead to the formation of the Swaziland Badminton Association (later the Eswatini Badminton Association) in the late 1990s.

Eswatini juniors made their first international appearance in badminton when the national association sent their first few players to compete in the 2007 African Junior Badminton Championships in Gaborone, Botswana. The team finished in 7th after being eliminated in the group stages.

=== Men's team ===
The Swazi men's team took part in the 2004 Thomas Cup African qualifiers in Pretoria. The team failed to qualify after finishing on the bottom of the round-robin tie.

=== Women's team ===
Eswatini also sent their women's team to compete in the 2004 Uber Cup African qualifiers. The team suffered the same fate as the men's team, finishing on the bottom of the group.

=== Mixed team ===
Eswatini competed in the 2004 African Badminton Championships mixed team event. The team were eliminated in the group stages but managed to win a match against Botswana and Réunion.

== Competitive record ==
=== Thomas Cup ===
Year	Round	Pos
1949 to 1967	Part of the United Kingdom	
1970 to 2002	Did not enter	
2004	Did not qualify	
2006	Did not enter	
2008	Did not enter	
2010	Did not enter	
2012	Did not enter	
2014	Did not enter	
2016	Did not enter	
2018	Did not enter	
2020	Did not enter	
2022	Did not enter	
2024	Did not enter	
2026	To be determined	
2028	To be determined	
2030	To be determined	

=== Uber Cup ===
Year	Round	Pos
1957 to 1966	Part of the United Kingdom	
1969 to 2002	Did not enter	
2004	Did not qualify	
2006	Did not enter	
2008	Did not enter	
2010	Did not enter	
2012	Did not enter	
2014	Did not enter	
2016	Did not enter	
2018	Did not enter	
2020	Did not enter	
2022	Did not enter	
2024	Did not enter	
2026	To be determined	
2028	To be determined	
2030	To be determined	

=== Sudirman Cup ===
Year	Round	Pos
1989 to 2023	Did not enter	
2025	To be determined	
2027	To be determined	
2029	To be determined	

=== Commonwealth Games ===
==== Men's team ====
Year	Round	Pos
1998	Did not enter	

==== Women's team ====
Year	Round	Pos
1998	Did not enter	

==== Mixed team ====
Year	Round	Pos
1978 to 2022	Did not enter	
2026	To be determined	

=== African Games ===
==== Mixed team ====
Year	Round	Pos
2003	Did not enter	
2007	Did not enter	
2011	Did not enter	
2015	Did not enter	
2019	Did not enter	
2027	To be determined	

=== African Team Championships ===
==== Men's team ====
Year	Round	Pos
1979 to 2024	Did not enter	
2026	To be determined	
2028	To be determined	
2030	To be determined	

==== Women's team ====
Year	Round	Pos
1979 to 2024	Did not enter	
2026	To be determined	
2028	To be determined	
2030	To be determined	

==== Mixed team ====
Year	Round	Pos
1980 to 2002	Did not enter	
2004	Group stage	11th
2006	Did not enter	
2007	Did not enter	
2009	Did not enter	
2011	Did not enter	
2013	Did not enter	
2014	Did not enter	
2017	Did not enter	
2019	Did not enter	
2021	Did not enter	
2023	Did not enter	
2025	To be determined	
2027	To be determined	
2029	To be determined	

**Red border color indicates tournament was held on home soil.

== Junior competitive record ==
=== Suhandinata Cup ===
Year	Round	Pos
2000 to 2024	Did not enter	
2025	To be determined	

=== African Youth Games ===
==== Men's team ====
Year	Round	Pos
2018	Did not enter	

==== Women's team ====
Year	Round	Pos
2018	Did not enter	

==== Mixed team ====
Year	Round	Pos
2014	Did not enter	

=== African Junior Team Championships ===
==== Mixed team ====
Year	Round	Pos
1979 to 2005	Did not enter	
2007	Group stage	7th
2009	Did not enter	
2011	Did not enter	
2013	Did not enter	
2016	Did not enter	
2021	Did not enter	
2022	Did not enter	
2024	Did not enter	

**Red border color indicates tournament was held on home soil.

== Players ==
=== Current squad ===
==== Men's team ====
Name	DoB/Age	Ranking of event		
Name	DoB/Age	MS	MD	XD
Lungelo Dlamini		–	–	–
Bongumuzi Mdluli		–	–	–
Siyabonga Dlamini		–	–	–
Banele Mazibuko		–	–	–
Menzi Mkhwanazi		–	–	–
Makhosini Mamba		–	–	–
Mlungisi Sifiso Dlamini		–	–	–
Stanley Ndzinisa		–	–	–

==== Women's team ====
Name	DoB/Age	Ranking of event		
Name	DoB/Age	WS	WD	XD
Ncamsile Ntshangase		–	–	–
Thandeka Dlamini		–	–	–
Busisiwe Ncongwane		–	–	–
Cabangile Ngwane		–	–	–
Philile Ndlangamandla		–	–	–
Fikile Mango		–	–	–

=== Previous squads ===
==== African Junior Team Championships ====
- Mixed team: 2007
