= All Africa Men's and Women's Team Badminton Championships =

International badminton competition

- Current season, competition or edition: 2026 All Africa Men's and Women's Team Badminton Championships
- Sport: Badminton
- Founded: 2004; 22 years ago
- Most recent champion: Algeria
- Website: badmintonafrica.com

All Africa Men's and Women's Team Badminton Championships is a continental stage tournament of Thomas and Uber Cups, organized by the Badminton Confederation of Africa (BCA), to crown the best national men's and women's badminton teams in Africa. The winner of this tournament will represent BCA at the Thomas and Uber Cup finals.

== Hosts ==
Year	Host city
2004	Pretoria, South Africa (1)
2006	Rose Hill, Mauritius (1)
2008	Rose Hill, Mauritius (2)
2010	Kampala, Uganda (1)
2012	Addis Ababa, Ethiopia (1)
2016	Rose Hill, Mauritius (3)
2018	Algiers, Algeria (1)
2020	Cairo, Egypt (1)
2022	Kampala, Uganda (2)
2024	Cairo, Egypt (2)
2026	Gaborone, Botswana (1)

== Medalists ==
Year	Men's team			Women's team		
Year	Gold	Silver	Bronze	Gold	Silver	Bronze
2004	South Africa	Nigeria	Mauritius	South Africa	Mauritius	Nigeria
2006	South Africa	Mauritius	Zambia	South Africa	Mauritius	Seychelles
2008	Nigeria	South Africa	Egypt Mauritius	South Africa	Nigeria	Mauritius Egypt
2010	Nigeria	Mauritius	Egypt South Africa	South Africa	Egypt	Burundi Nigeria
2012	South Africa	Nigeria	Mauritius Egypt	South Africa	Nigeria	Mauritius Egypt
2016	South Africa	Mauritius	Ghana Algeria	Mauritius	Egypt	Ghana Uganda
2018	Algeria	Nigeria	Mauritius Ghana	Mauritius	Nigeria	Egypt Algeria
2020	Algeria	Mauritius	South Africa Egypt	Egypt	Algeria	Mauritius
2022	Algeria	Egypt	South Africa Mauritius	Egypt	Uganda	Mauritius South Africa
2024	Algeria	Nigeria	Egypt Mauritius	South Africa	Uganda	Algeria Nigeria
2026	Algeria	Mauritius	Egypt Zambia	South Africa	Egypt	Nigeria Algeria
