= 2004 African Badminton Championships =

Tournament details
- Dates: 18–24 April
- Edition: 12th
- Venue: National Badminton Centre
- Location: Beau Bassin-Rose Hill, Mauritius

The 2004 African Badminton Championships were the continental badminton championships to crown the best players and teams across Africa. The tournament was held at the National Badminton Centre in Beau Bassin-Rose Hill, Mauritius, from 18 to 24 April 2004. This tournament also served as the African qualifiers for the 2004 Summer Olympics badminton event.

A total of 12 teams competed in the team event. In the semi-final of the team event, South Africa and Nigeria beat Mauritius and Seychelles to enter the final. South Africa won the final by defeating Nigeria 3–1.

== Medalists ==
Event	Gold	Silver	Bronze
Men's singles	(Nigeria) Dotun Akinsanya	(Réunion) Olivier Fossy	(South Africa) Chris Dednam
Men's singles	(Nigeria) Dotun Akinsanya	(Réunion) Olivier Fossy	(Nigeria) Ibrahim Adamu
Women's singles	(South Africa) Michelle Edwards	(South Africa) Chantal Botts	(Mauritius) Amrita Sawaram
Women's singles	(South Africa) Michelle Edwards	(South Africa) Chantal Botts	(Nigeria) Susan Ideh
Men's doubles	(South Africa) Chris Dednam (South Africa) Johan Kleingeld	(Nigeria) Dotun Akinsanya (Nigeria) Abimbola Odejoke	(South Africa) Stewart Carson (South Africa) Dorian James
Men's doubles	(South Africa) Chris Dednam (South Africa) Johan Kleingeld	(Nigeria) Dotun Akinsanya (Nigeria) Abimbola Odejoke	(Mauritius) Stephan Beeharry (Mauritius) Yogesh Mahadnac
Women's doubles	(South Africa) Chantal Botts (South Africa) Michelle Edwards	(Nigeria) Grace Daniel (Nigeria) Miriam Sude	(Seychelles) Juliette Ah-Wan (Seychelles) Shirley Etienne
Women's doubles	(South Africa) Chantal Botts (South Africa) Michelle Edwards	(Nigeria) Grace Daniel (Nigeria) Miriam Sude	(Mauritius) Karen Foo Kune (Mauritius) Amrita Sawaram
Mixed doubles	(Nigeria) Greg Okuonghae (Nigeria) Grace Daniel	(Mauritius) Stephan Beeharry (Mauritius) Shama Aboobakar	(South Africa) Johan Kleingeld (South Africa) Marika Daubern
Mixed doubles	(Nigeria) Greg Okuonghae (Nigeria) Grace Daniel	(Mauritius) Stephan Beeharry (Mauritius) Shama Aboobakar	(South Africa) Dorian James (South Africa) Michelle Edwards
Mixed team	South Africa	Nigeria	Seychelles
Mixed team	South Africa	Nigeria	Mauritius

=== Medal table ===
* Host nation (Mauritius)

Rank	Nation	Gold	Silver	Bronze	Total
1	South Africa	4	1	4	9
2	Nigeria	2	3	2	7
3	Mauritius*	0	1	4	5
4	Réunion	0	1	0	1
5	Seychelles	0	0	2	2
Totals (5 entries)		6	6	12	24

== Team event ==
=== Group stage ===
==== Group A ====
Team	Pld	W	L	MF	MA	MD	Pts
South Africa	5	5	0	23	2	+21	5
Mauritius	5	4	1	22	3	+19	4
Egypt	5	3	2	13	12	+1	3
Uganda	5	2	3	12	13	−1	2
Kenya	5	1	4	5	20	−15	1
Eritrea	5	0	5	0	25	−25	0

South Africa	3–2	Mauritius
South Africa	5–0	Egypt
South Africa	5–0	Uganda
South Africa	5–0	Kenya
South Africa	5–0	Eritrea
Mauritius	5–0	Egypt
Mauritius	5–0	Uganda
Mauritius	5–0	Kenya
Mauritius	5–0	Eritrea
Egypt	3–2	Uganda
Egypt	5–0	Kenya
Egypt	5–0	Eritrea
Uganda	5–0	Kenya
Uganda	5–0	Eritrea
Kenya	5–0	Eritrea

==== Group B ====
Team	Pld	W	L	MF	MA	MD	Pts
Nigeria	5	5	0	25	0	+25	5
Seychelles	5	4	1	18	7	+11	4
Réunion	5	3	2	11	14	−3	3
Algeria	5	2	3	12	13	−1	2
Botswana	5	1	4	5	20	−15	1
Swaziland	5	0	5	2	23	−21	0

Nigeria	5–0	Seychelles
Nigeria	5–0	Algeria
Nigeria	5–0	Réunion
Nigeria	5–0	Botswana
Nigeria	5–0	Swaziland
Seychelles	4–1	Algeria
Seychelles	4–1	Réunion
Seychelles	5–0	Botswana
Seychelles	5–0	Swaziland
Algeria	2–3	Réunion
Algeria	5–0	Botswana
Algeria	5–0	Swaziland
Réunion	4–1	Botswana
Réunion	4–1	Swaziland
Botswana	4–1	Swaziland

=== Knockout stage ===
Semi-finals
South Africa	3
Seychelles	0
Mauritius	2
Nigeria	3

Final
South Africa	3
Nigeria	1

=== Final ===
South Africa
3
National Badminton Centre, Court 1
21 April 2004

Nigeria
1

			1	2	3
1	(South Africa) (Nigeria)	Chris Dednam; Dotun Akinsanya	15; 2	3; 15	15; 10
2	(South Africa) (Nigeria)	Michelle Edwards; Grace Daniel	11; 3	13; 12
3	(South Africa) (Nigeria)	Johan Kleingeld / Chris Dednam; Ibrahim Adamu / Greg Okuonghae	10; 15	10; 15
4	(South Africa) (Nigeria)	Chantal Botts / Michelle Edwards; Susan Ideh / Miriam Sude	15; 4	15; 2
5	(South Africa) (Nigeria)	Dorian James / Michelle Edwards; Greg Okuonghae / Grace Daniel				not played
