= 2011 Sudirman Cup =

Tournament details
- Dates: 22 – 29 May
- Edition: 12th
- Level: International
- Venue: Qingdao Sports Center
- Location: Qingdao, China

The 2011 Sudirman Cup was the twelfth tournament of the Sudirman Cup. It was held from May 22–29, 2011 in Qingdao, China. According to the Badminton World Federation (BWF) 32 teams confirmed their participation, for the first time twelve teams competed in the elite group to battle for the title.

China defeated Denmark 3–0 in the final to win the Cup for the fourth consecutive time and eight time overall.

== Host city selection ==
Two cities (one from Asia and one from Europe) declared interest to host the event. Qingdao later revealed as the sole bidder and the bid was approved by BWF during a council meeting in Kuala Lumpur.

== Seedings ==
The seedings for teams competing in the tournament were released on March 9, 2011. It is based on aggregated points from the best players in the world ranking. The tournament will be divided into four groups, with twelve teams in the elite group competing for the title. Eight teams will be seeded into both the second and third groups, while only five teams will compete in the fourth group. The draw was held on April 17, 2011.

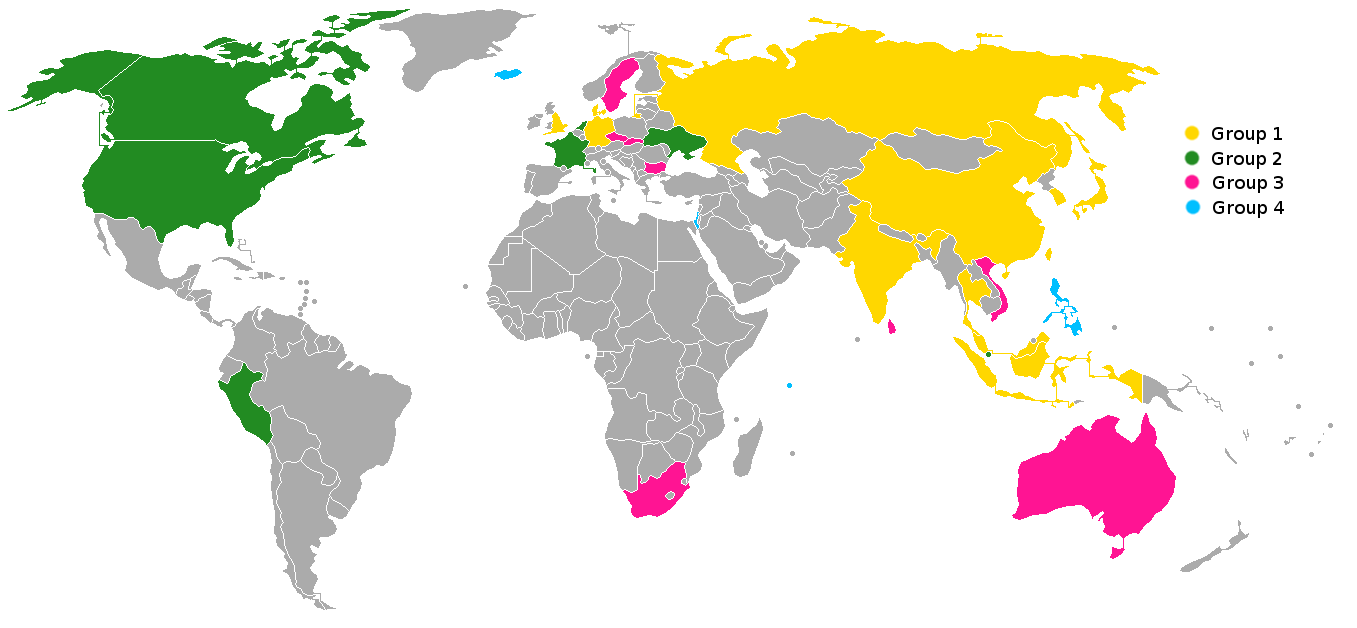
Nations to compete at the 2011 Sudirman Cup

=== Group 1 ===
1. China
2. Denmark
3. Indonesia
4. Chinese Taipei
5. South Korea
6. Malaysia
7. Thailand
8. Japan
9. Germany
10. India
11. England
12. Russia

=== Group 2 ===
13. Hong Kong
14. Netherlands
15. France
16. Canada
17. Poland
18. Singapore
19. USA
20. Ukraine

=== Group 3 ===
21. Bulgaria
22. Peru
23. Vietnam
24. Czech Republic
25. Sweden
26. Australia
27. South Africa
28. Slovakia

=== Group 4 ===
29. Philippines
30. Sri Lanka
31. Iceland
32. Israel
33. Seychelles

== Group 1 ==
=== Group stage ===
Qualified for quarterfinals
Eliminated

==== Group 1A ====
Team	Pts	Pld	W	L	MF	MA
China	2	2	2	0	9	1
Japan	1	2	1	1	4	6
Germany	0	2	0	2	2	8

May 22, 2011
China	4–1	Germany
May 23, 2011
Japan	4–1	Germany
May 24, 2011
China	5–0	Japan

==== Group 1B ====
Team	Pts	Pld	W	L	MF	MA
Indonesia	2	2	2	0	7	3
Malaysia	1	2	1	1	6	4
Russia	0	2	0	2	2	8

May 22, 2011
Indonesia	4–1	Russia
May 23, 2011
Malaysia	4–1	Russia
May 25, 2011
Indonesia	3–2	Malaysia

==== Group 1C ====
Team	Pts	Pld	W	L	MF	MA
Chinese Taipei	2	2	2	0	6	4
India	1	2	1	1	5	5
Thailand	0	2	0	2	4	6

May 22, 2011
Chinese Taipei	3–2	India
May 23, 2011
Thailand	2–3	India
May 24, 2011
Chinese Taipei	3–2	Thailand

==== Group 1D ====
Team	Pts	Pld	W	L	MF	MA
South Korea	2	2	2	0	7	3
Denmark	1	2	1	1	7	3
England	0	2	0	2	1	9

May 22, 2011
Denmark	5–0	England
May 23, 2011
South Korea	4–1	England
May 25, 2011
Denmark	2–3	South Korea

=== Knockout stage ===
The draw for the quarterfinals was held after the completion of the final matches in the group stage on May 25, 2011.

==== Bracket ====
Quarterfinals
26 May
China	3
India	1
26 May
South Korea	3
Malaysia	2
27 May
Denmark	3
Chinese Taipei	1
27 May
Japan	2
Indonesia	3

Semifinals
28 May
China	3
South Korea	1
28 May
Denmark	3
Indonesia	1

Final
29 May
China	3
Denmark	0

==== Quarterfinals ====
China
3
Qingdao Sports Center, Qingdao, China
May 26, 2011

India
1

			1	2	3
1	(China) (India)	Cai Yun / Fu Haifeng; Sanave Thomas / Rupesh Kumar	21; 15	21; 14
2	(China) (India)	Wang Xin; Saina Nehwal	15; 21	11; 21
3	(China) (India)	Lin Dan; Parupalli Kashyap	21; 14	21; 14
4	(China) (India)	Wang Xiaoli / Yu Yang; Jwala Gutta / Ashwini Ponnappa	21; 8	21; 13
5	(China) (India)	Xu Chen / Ma Jin; Pranav Chopra / Prajakta Sawant				not played

South Korea
3
Qingdao Sports Center, Qingdao, China
May 26, 2011

Malaysia
2

			1	2	3
1	(South Korea) (Malaysia)	Ko Sung-hyun / Ha Jung-eun; Koo Kien Keat / Chin Eei Hui	21; 17	21; 17
2	(South Korea) (Malaysia)	Park Sung-hwan; Lee Chong Wei	18; 21	14; 21
3	(South Korea) (Malaysia)	Jung Jae-sung / Lee Yong-dae; Tan Boon Heong / Hoon Thien How	15; 21	21; 14	14; 21
4	(South Korea) (Malaysia)	Bae Youn-joo; Tee Jing Yi	21; 11	21; 11
5	(South Korea) (Malaysia)	Ha Jung-eun / Kim Min-jung; Chin Eei Hui / Wong Pei Tty	19; 21	21; 16	21; 10

Denmark
3
Qingdao Sports Center, Qingdao, China
May 27, 2011

Chinese Taipei
1

			1	2	3
1	(Denmark) (Chinese Taipei)	Joachim Fischer Nielsen / Christinna Pedersen; Cheng Wen-hsing / Chen Hung-ling	21; 17	21; 13
2	(Denmark) (Chinese Taipei)	Peter Gade; Hsueh Hsuan-yi	20; 22	21; 15	21; 10
3	(Denmark) (Chinese Taipei)	Carsten Mogensen / Mathias Boe; Lee Sheng-mu / Fang Chieh-min	20; 22	23; 21	18; 21
4	(Denmark) (Chinese Taipei)	Tine Baun; Tai Tzu-ying	13; 21	21; 16	21; 14
5	(Denmark) (Chinese Taipei)	Christinna Pedersen / Kamilla Rytter Juhl; Cheng Wen-hsing / Chien Yu-chin				not played

Japan
2
Qingdao Sports Center, Qingdao, China
May 27, 2011

Indonesia
3

			1	2	3
1	(Japan) (Indonesia)	Noriyasu Hirata / Hirokatsu Hashimoto; Alvent Yulianto Chandra / Mohammad Ahsan	17; 21	16; 21
2	(Japan) (Indonesia)	Eriko Hirose; Adriyanti Firdasari	21; 19	17; 21	21; 14
3	(Japan) (Indonesia)	Kenichi Tago; Simon Santoso	21; 15	21; 9
4	(Japan) (Indonesia)	Mami Naito / Shizuka Matsuo; Greysia Polii / Meiliana Jauhari	17; 21	16; 21
5	(Japan) (Indonesia)	Shintaro Ikeda / Reiko Shiota; Fran Kurniawan Teng / Pia Zebadiah Bernadet	19; 21	25; 23	14; 21

==== Semifinals ====
China
3
Qingdao Sports Center, Qingdao, China
May 28, 2011

South Korea
1

			1	2	3
1	(China) (South Korea)	Xu Chen / Ma Jin; Ko Sung-hyun / Ha Jung-eun	21; 23	21; 14	24; 22
2	(China) (South Korea)	Lin Dan; Park Sung-hwan	21; 16	21; 10
3	(China) (South Korea)	Cai Yun / Fu Haifeng; Jung Jae-sung / Lee Yong-dae	21; 19	16; 21	14; 21
4	(China) (South Korea)	Wang Shixian; Bae Youn-joo	21; 15	21; 12
5	(China) (South Korea)	Yu Yang / Wang Xiaoli; Ha Jung-eun / Kim Min-jung				not played

Denmark
3
Qingdao Sports Center, Qingdao, China
May 28, 2011

Indonesia
1

			1	2	3
1	(Denmark) (Indonesia)	Joachim Fischer Nielsen / Christinna Pedersen; Fran Kurniawan Teng / Pia Zebadiah Bernadet	15; 21	21; 11	21; 13
2	(Denmark) (Indonesia)	Peter Gade; Simon Santoso	21; 18	21; 16
3	(Denmark) (Indonesia)	Carsten Mogensen / Mathias Boe; Alvent Yulianto Chandra / Mohammad Ahsan	21; 23	17; 21
4	(Denmark) (Indonesia)	Tine Baun; Adriyanti Firdasari	21; 13	21; 13
5	(Denmark) (Indonesia)	Christinna Pedersen / Kamilla Rytter Juhl; Greysia Polii / Meiliana Jauhari				not played

==== Final ====
China
3
Qingdao Sports Center, Qingdao, China
May 29, 2011

Denmark
0

			1	2	3
1	(China) (Denmark)	Xu Chen / Ma Jin; Joachim Fischer Nielsen / Christinna Pedersen	21; 14	21; 14
2	(China) (Denmark)	Lin Dan; Peter Gade	21; 16	21; 11
3	(China) (Denmark)	Cai Yun / Fu Haifeng; Carsten Mogensen / Jonas Rasmussen	21; 17	21; 13
4	(China) (Denmark)	Wang Xin; Tine Baun				not played
5	(China) (Denmark)	Yu Yang / Wang Xiaoli; Christinna Pedersen / Kamilla Rytter Juhl				not played

2011 Sudirman Cup champions

China
Eighth title

== Group 2 ==
=== Group 2A ===
Team	Pts	Pld	W	L	MF	MA
France	3	3	3	0	10	5
Hong Kong	2	3	2	1	9	6
Ukraine	1	3	1	2	5	10
Poland	0	3	0	3	6	9

May 23, 2011
France	3–2	Poland
Hong Kong	4–1	Ukraine
May 25, 2011
Hong Kong	3–2	Poland
France	4–1	Ukraine
May 26, 2011
Hong Kong	2–3	France
Poland	2–3	Ukraine

=== Group 2B ===
Team	Pts	Pld	W	L	MF	MA
Singapore	3	3	3	0	13	2
Canada	2	3	2	1	6	9
United States	1	3	1	2	7	8
Netherlands	0	3	0	3	4	11

May 24, 2011
Canada	0–5	Singapore
Netherlands	1–4	United States
May 25, 2011
Netherlands	1–4	Singapore
Canada	3–2	United States
May 26, 2011
Singapore	4–1	United States
Netherlands	2–3	Canada

=== Playoffs ===
May 27, 2011	France	1–3	Singapore	13th/14th place
	Hong Kong	3–2	Canada	15th/16th place
	Ukraine	3–2	United States	17th/18th place
	Poland	3–2	Netherlands	19th/20th place

== Group 3 ==
=== Group 3A ===
Team	Pts	Pld	W	L	MF	MA
Australia	3	3	3	0	13	2
Czech Republic	2	3	2	1	9	6
Peru	1	3	1	2	7	8
Slovakia	0	3	0	3	1	14

May 22, 2011
Peru	4–1	Slovakia
Czech Republic	0–5	Australia
May 24, 2011
Peru	2–3	Australia
Czech Republic	5–0	Slovakia
May 25, 2011
Peru	1–4	Czech Republic
May 26, 2011
Australia	5–0	Slovakia

=== Group 3B ===
Team	Pts	Pld	W	L	MF	MA
Sweden	3	3	3	0	12	3
Vietnam	2	3	2	1	12	3
South Africa	1	3	1	2	4	11
Bulgaria	0	3	0	3	2	13

May 22, 2011
Bulgaria	1–4	South Africa
Vietnam	2–3	Sweden
May 24, 2011
Bulgaria	1–4	Sweden
Vietnam	5–0	South Africa
May 25, 2011
Sweden	5–0	South Africa
May 26, 2011
Bulgaria	0–5	Vietnam

=== Playoffs ===
May 27, 2011	Australia	2–3	Sweden	21st/22nd place
	Czech Republic	Walkover	Vietnam	23rd/24th place
	Peru	2–3	South Africa	25th/26th place
	Slovakia	1–3	Bulgaria	27th/28th place

== Group 4 ==
Team	Pts	Pld	W	L	MF	MA
Sri Lanka	4	4	4	0	17	3
Philippines	3	4	3	1	14	6
Iceland	2	4	2	2	13	7
Israel	1	4	1	3	6	14
Seychelles	0	4	0	4	0	20

May 22, 2011
Philippines	5–0	Israel
Sri Lanka	5–0	Seychelles
May 23, 2011
Sri Lanka	5–0	Israel
Iceland	5–0	Seychelles
May 24, 2011
Philippines	5–0	Seychelles
Sri Lanka	3–2	Iceland
May 25, 2011
Israel	5–0	Seychelles
Philippines	3–2	Iceland
May 26, 2011
Sri Lanka	4–1	Philippines
Iceland	4–1	Israel

== Final standings ==
1. China
2. Denmark
3. Indonesia
3. South Korea
5. Chinese Taipei
5. India
5. Japan
5. Malaysia
9. England
9. Germany
9. Russia
9. Thailand
13. Singapore
14. France
15. Hong Kong
16. Canada
17. Ukraine
18. United States
19. Poland
20. Netherlands
21. Sweden
22. Australia
23. Vietnam
24. Czech Republic
25. South Africa
26. Peru
27. Bulgaria
28. Slovakia
29. Sri Lanka
30. Philippines
31. Iceland
32. Israel
33. Seychelles
