= Maldives national badminton team =

National badminton team representing the Maldives

Maldives
- Association: Badminton Association of Maldives (BaMDV)
- Confederation: BA (Asia)
- President: Moosa Nashid

BWF ranking
- Current ranking: 58 ▲8 (2 January 2024)
- Highest ranking: 35 (4 October 2018)

Asian Men's Team Championships
- Appearances: 2 (first in 2016)
- Best result: Group stage

Asian Men's Team Championships
- Appearances: 2 (first in 2016)
- Best result: Group stage

The Maldives national badminton team (Dhivehi: ދިވެހިރާއްޖެނަތިޮނަލ ބަދމިނތޮނ ތެަމ) represents Maldives in international badminton team competitions. The Maldives have participated twice in the Badminton Asia Team Championships in 2016 and 2018 respectively. Both teams were eliminated in the group stages.

The Maldives made its badminton Olympic debut in the 2012 Summer Olympics when Mohamed Ajfan Rasheed received a wild card entry in men's singles.

== Participation in Badminton Asia competitions ==
Men's team

| Year | Result |
|---|---|
| 2016 | Group stage |
| 2018 | Group stage |

Women's team

| Year | Result |
|---|---|
| 2016 | Group stage |
| 2018 | Group stage |

== Participation in Indian Ocean Island Games ==
The Maldives national team participated in the Indian Ocean Island Games. The men's team were runners-up in 2015 and 2019 when they lost the final tie to Mauritius. The women's team were semifinalists in both editions.

Men's team

| Year | Result |
|---|---|
| (Réunion) 2015 | (silver) Runner-up |

Women's team

| Year | Result |
|---|---|
| (Mauritius) 2015 | (bronze) Semi-finalists |

== Players ==
=== Current squad ===
As of 2 January 2024

==== Men's team ====
| Name | DoB/Age | Ranking of event | | |
| Name | DoB/Age | MS | MD | XD |
|---|---|---|---|---|
| Hussein Zayan Shaheed | 30 May 1993 (age 33) | 226 | 196 | 98 |
| Thoif Ahmed Mohamed | 26 February 1996 (age 30) | 1190 | 196 | - |
| Ahmed Nibal | 10 June 2002 (age 24) | 342 | 128 | 211 |
| Mohamed Ajfan Rasheed | 15 February 1990 (age 36) | 440 | 128 | 740 |

==== Women's team ====
| Name | DoB/Age | Ranking of event | | |
| Name | DoB/Age | WS | WD | XD |
|---|---|---|---|---|
| Aminath Nabeeha Abdul Razzaq | 13 June 1999 (age 27) | 164 | 89 | 211 |
| Fathimath Nabaaha Abdul Razzaq | 13 June 1999 (age 27) | 108 | 89 | 98 |
| Maisa Fathuhulla Ismail | 1 June 1999 (age 27) | 716 | 186 | 740 |
| Aishath Afnaan Rasheed | 1 March 1992 (age 34) | 822 | 186 | - |
