= Mauritius national badminton team =

Mauritius
- Association: Mauritius Badminton Association (MBA)
- Confederation: BCA (Africa)
- President: Neerunjun Sharma Nundah

BWF ranking
- Current ranking: 33 ▲3 (2 April 2024)
- Highest ranking: 23 (4 October 2018)

Sudirman Cup
- Appearances: 5 (first in 1989)
- Best result: Group stage

Uber Cup
- Appearances: 2 (first in 2016)
- Best result: Group stage

African Mixed Team Championships
- Appearances: 18 (first in 2000)
- Best result: Champions (2000)

African Men's Team Championships
- Appearances: 6 (first in 2006)
- Best result: Runners-up (2016, 2020)

African Women's Team Championships
- Appearances: 6 (first in 2004)
- Best result: Champions (2016, 2018)

The Mauritius national badminton team (French: Équipe nationale de badminton de l'ile Maurice; Mauritian Creole: Ekipi nasional badminton Moris) represents Mauritius in international badminton team competitions. It is controlled by the Mauritius Badminton Association, the governing body of badminton in Mauritius.

Mauritius was the first African country to make an appearance in the Sudirman Cup. The team also first competed in the African Badminton Championships in 1988. The team won their first title at the African Mixed Team Championships in 2000. The team qualified for its first ever Uber Cup in 2016 after winning the African Women's Team Championships for the first time. Mauritius have yet to qualify for the Thomas Cup.

Mauritius also competes in the Indian Ocean Island Games and has won every gold in all of the team events since its inaugural edition in 1979.

== History ==
=== Men's team ===
In 1979, Mauritius competed in the men's team event at the 1979 WBF World Championships in Hangzhou, China. The team were grouped with Thailand, Burma and Tanzania. The team lost 5–0 to Thailand and Burma. The team then defeated Tanzania 3–2 to finish third in the group. The team finished in 12th place on the final ranking.

In 1986, the team failed to qualify for the Thomas Cup after losing all their matches in the group stage. In 1998, the team competed in the Commonwealth Games men's team event and were drawn into Group D with New Zealand, South Africa, Ghana and Brunei. The team did not advance to the knockout stage.

In the 2000 Thomas Cup qualifiers in New Delhi, the team defeated Nepal and Sri Lanka but lost their chances of qualifying after losing to Thailand and placing second in the group. From 2002 to 2012, the team entered the semi-finals of the Thomas Cup African Qualifiers but could not qualify for the Thomas Cup finals.

In 2016, the team were runners-up at the 2016 African Men's Team Championships after losing 3–1 to South Africa in the final. In the 2018 African Men's Team Championships, the team were eliminated in the semi-finals after losing 3–1 to Algeria. Two years later, the team went head to head against Algeria again in the finals of the 2020 African Men's Team Championships. Julien Paul and Aatish Lubah gave the team a head start by winning the first two singles. The team however could not convert in the next three matches and ended up losing 3–2 to their opponents in the final. The team entered the semi-finals of the African Men's Team Championships in 2022 and 2024 but could not advance to the finals.

=== Women's team ===
Mauritius competed in the women's team event at the 1979 WBF World Championships and were drawn into Group A with hosts China and Singapore. The team finished on the bottom of the group after losing 5–0 to China and Singapore. In the fifth place playoff, the team lost 5–0 to Hong Kong.

The team began their Uber Cup qualifying campaign in 1992 but did not advance further from the group stages. In 1998, the team competed in the Commonwealth Games women's team event. The team placed third in their group after defeating Trinidad and Tobago 5–0. The team also competed in the Uber Cup African Qualifiers from 2004 to 2012 but could not qualify for the Cup tournament.

In 2016, the team emerged as champions of the African Women's Team Championships after defeating Egypt 3–0 in the final. As African champions, the team made history by qualifying for the Uber Cup for the first time. In the 2016 Uber Cup, the team were drawn into Group B with South Korea, Chinese Taipei and the United States. The team lost 5–0 to all of their opponents in the group and finished in 16th place on the overall ranking.

In 2018, the team won the African Women's Team Championships and qualified for the Uber Cup for a second time after defeating Nigeria 3–0 in the final. In the 2018 Uber Cup, the team were drawn into Group C with South Korea, Denmark and Russia. The team were eliminated in the group stages after losing 5–0 to South Korea, Denmark and Russia. In the 2020 African Women's Team Championships, the team finished in third place after losing to Algeria and Egypt. In 2022, the team were semi-finalists at the 2022 African Women's Team Championships. In 2024, the team failed to reach the knockout stage of the African Women's Team Championships for the first time since 2016.

=== Mixed team ===
Mauritius made their debut at the Sudirman Cup in 1989. The team were placed into Group 7 with Bulgaria and France. The team lost 5–0 to both teams and finished in 28th place on the overall rankings. In the 1991 Sudirman Cup, the team were placed into Group 8 with North Korea, Spain, Italy and Malta. The team lost 4–1 to Spain and North Korea but won against Italy and Malta to finish third in the group. In the 1995 Sudirman Cup, the team finished first in their group and finished in 40th place on the final rankings. In the 1997 Sudirman Cup, the team placed 45th after defeating Guatemala in the playoffs. In the 1999 Sudirman Cup, the team finished in 39th place after defeating South Africa.

In 2000, the team won the African Mixed Team Championships for the first time by defeating hosts Nigeria in the final. In 2002, the team competed in the 2002 Commonwealth Games mixed team event and finished last in their group. In 2003, the team were semi-finalists at the 2003 All-African Games. In 2015, Mauritius emerged as champions of the African Games mixed team event for the first time by defeating South Africa in the final. In 2019, the team were runners-up at the 2019 African Mixed Team Championships. In 2023, the team lost to Egypt in the 2023 African Mixed Team Championships and lost their chances of qualifying for the 2023 Sudirman Cup.

== Competitive record ==
=== Thomas Cup ===
Year	Round	Pos
1949	Part of the United Kingdom	
1952	Part of the United Kingdom	
1955	Part of the United Kingdom	
1958	Part of the United Kingdom	
1961	Part of the United Kingdom	
1964	Part of the United Kingdom	
1967	Part of the United Kingdom	
1970	Did not enter	
1973	Did not enter	
1976	Did not enter	
1979	Did not enter	
1982	Did not enter	
1984	Did not enter	
1986	Did not qualify	
1988	Did not enter	
1990	Did not qualify	
1992	Did not qualify	
1994	Did not qualify	
1996	Did not qualify	
1998	Did not qualify	
2000	Did not qualify	
2002	Did not enter	
2004	Did not qualify	
2006	Did not qualify	
2008	Did not qualify	
2010	Did not qualify	
2012	Did not qualify	
2014	Did not enter	
2016	Did not qualify	
2018	Did not qualify	
2020	Did not qualify	
2022	Did not qualify	
2024	Did not qualify	
2026	Did not qualify	
2028	To be determined	
2030	To be determined	

=== Uber Cup ===
Year	Round	Pos
1957 to 1969	Part of the United Kingdom	
1960 to 1990	Did not enter	
1992	Did not qualify	
1994	Did not qualify	
1996	Did not qualify	
1998	Did not qualify	
2000	Did not enter	
2002	Did not enter	
2004	Did not qualify	
2006	Did not qualify	
2008	Did not qualify	
2010	Did not qualify	
2012	Did not qualify	
2014	Did not qualify	
2016	Group stage	16th
2018	Group stage	16th
2020	Did not enter	
2022	Did not enter	
2024	Did not enter	
2026	Did not qualify	
2028	To be determined	
2030	To be determined	

=== Sudirman Cup ===
Year	Round	Pos
1989	Group stage	28th
1991	Group stage	33rd
1993	Did not enter	
1995	Group stage	40th
1997	Group stage	45th
1999	Group stage	39th
2001	Did not enter	
2003	Did not enter	
2005	Did not enter	
2007	Did not enter	
2009	Did not enter	
2011	Did not enter	
2013	Did not enter	
2015	Did not enter	
2017	Did not enter	
2019	Did not enter	
2021	Did not qualify	
2023	Did not qualify	
2025	Did not qualify	
2027	To be determined	
2029	To be determined	

=== WBF World Championships ===
==== Men's team ====
Year	Round	Pos
1979	Group stage	12th

==== Women's team ====
Year	Round	Pos
1979	Group stage	6th

=== Commonwealth Games ===
==== Men's team ====
Year	Round	Pos
1998	Group stage	

==== Women's team ====
Year	Round	Pos
1998	Group stage	

==== Mixed team ====
Year	Round	Pos
1978 to 1994	Did not enter	
2002	Group stage	
2006	Group stage	
2010	Group stage	
2014	Group stage	
2018	Quarter-finals	8th
2022	Group stage	
2026	To be determined	

=== African Games ===
==== Mixed team ====
Year	Round	Pos
2003	Semi-finals	3rd
2007	Group stage	5th
2011	Semi-finals	3rd
2015	Champions	1st
2019	Group stage	
2027	To be determined	

=== African Team Championships ===
==== Men's team ====
Year	Round	Pos
1979 to 1984	Did not enter	
1988	Third place	3rd
2016	Runners-up	2nd
2018	Semi-finals	3rd
2020	Runners-up	2nd
2022	Semi-finals	3rd
2024	Semi-finals	4th
2026	Runners-up	2nd
2028
2030

==== Women's team ====
Year	Round	Pos
1979 to 1984	Did not enter	
1988	Third place	3rd
2016	Champions	1st
2018	Champions	1st
2020	Third place	3rd
2022	Semi-finals	3rd
2024	Group stage	5th
2026	Quarter-finals	5th
2028	To be determined	
2030	To be determined	

==== Mixed team ====
Year	Round	Pos
1980 to 1984	Did not enter	
1988	Third place	3rd
1992	Semi-finals	3rd
1994	Runners-up	2nd
1998	Runners-up	2nd
2000	Champions	1st
2002	Third place	3rd
2004	Semi-finals	3rd
2006	Semi-finals	3rd
2007	Semi-finals	3rd
2009	Semi-finals	3rd
2011	Semi-finals	3rd
2013	Semi-finals	3rd
2014	Semi-finals	3rd
2017	Group stage	8th
2019	Runners-up	2nd
2021	Quarter-finals	5th
2023	Runners-up	2nd
2025	Runners-up	2nd
2027	To be determined	
2029	To be determined	

=== Indian Ocean Island Games ===
==== Men's team ====
Year	Round	Pos
1979	Champions	1st
1990	Champions	1st
1993	Champions	1st
1998	Champions	1st
2003	Champions	1st
2011	Champions	1st
2015	Champions	1st
2019	Champions	1st
2023	Champions	1st
2027	To be determined	

==== Women's team ====
Year	Round	Pos
1979	Champions	1st
1990	Champions	1st
1993	Champions	1st
1998	Champions	1st
2003	Champions	1st
2011	Champions	1st
2015	Champions	1st
2019	Champions	1st
2023	Champions	1st
2027	To be determined	

==== Mixed team ====
Year	Round	Pos
1985	Champions	1st

**Red border color indicates tournament was held on home soil.

== Junior competitive record ==
=== Suhandinata Cup ===
Year	Round	Pos
2000 to 2022	Did not enter	
2023	Withdrew	
2024	Group stage	30th
2025	Did not enter	
2026	Group stage	22nd of 47

=== African Youth Games ===
==== Men's team ====
Year	Round	Pos
2018	Semi-finals	4th

==== Women's team ====
Year	Round	Pos
2018	Semi-finals	4th

==== Mixed team ====
Year	Round	Pos
2014	Semi-finals	4th

=== African Junior Team Championships ===
==== Mixed team ====
Year	Round	Pos
1979 to 1984	Did not enter	
1988	Third place	3rd
1993	Did not enter	
1995	Third place	3rd
1997	Champions	1st
1999	Third place	3rd
2001	Third place	3rd
2003	Third place	3rd
2005	Group stage	5th
2007	Semi-finals	3rd
2009	Runners-up	2nd
2011	Runners-up	2nd
2013	Semi-finals	3rd
2016	Semi-finals	3rd
2021	Semi-finals	4th
2022	Champions	1st
2024	Champions	1st
2026	Semi-finals	3rd

== Players ==
=== Current squad ===
As of 2 January 2024

==== Men's team ====
Name	DoB/Age	Ranking of event		
Name	DoB/Age	MS	MD	XD
Julien Paul	7 January 1996 (age 30)	128	242	126
Jean Bernard Bongout	18 February 2001 (age 25)	527	242	258
Melvin Appiah	25 March 1999 (age 27)	403	270	158
Tejraj Pultoo	19 October 1999 (age 26)	503	370	567
Khemtish Nundah	22 July 2005 (age 21)	391	166	205
Lucas Douce	17 November 2006 (age 19)	572	166	387

==== Women's team ====
Name	DoB/Age	Ranking of event		
Name	DoB/Age	WS	WD	XD
Kate Ludik	29 March 1993 (age 33)	140	415	126
Lorna Bodha	22 January 2003 (age 23)	421	144	387
Kobita Dookhee	3 August 1998 (age 28)	586	144	258
Vilina Appiah	11 February 2003 (age 23)	330	224	158
Tiya Bhurtun	5 September 2008 (age 18)	379	224	205
Layna Luxmi Chiniah	12 November 2008 (age 17)	431	403	494
