= Botswana national badminton team =

National badminton team representing Botswana

Botswana
- Association: Botswana Badminton Association (BBA)
- Confederation: BCA (Africa)
- Chairman: Marumo Morule

BWF ranking
- Current ranking: 95 ▲2 (2 April 2024)
- Highest ranking: 63 (16 October 2014)

African Mixed Team Championships
- Appearances: 14 (first in 1994)
- Best result: Group stage

The Botswana national badminton team (Tswana: La lesizwe laseBotswana lebhedminton) represents Botswana in international team competitions and is controlled by the Botswana Badminton Association in Gaborone, Botswana. The national team was formed after badminton was starting to be played in Motswana cities, Orapa, Selebi-Phikwe and Jwaneng.

The Motswana team have competed in the African Badminton Championships mixed team event. The team have also participated once at the Summer Universiade in 2017.

== History ==
It is not exactly known when badminton was first played in Botswana. In the 1980s, the sport began to spread locally and was played around the Central District in Francistown, Orapa and Selebi-Phikwe. This led to the formation of the Botswana Badminton Association and the Motswana badminton team in 1990. The Botswana Badminton Association soon joined the Badminton World Federation and the Badminton Confederation of Africa under the chairmanship of Ishmael Bhamjee.

=== Mixed team ===
The Motswana team debuted internationally at the African Mixed Team Championships in 2011. In that same year, the Motswana team qualified and competed in the 10th African Games. The team were drawn into Group 4 with South Africa, Congo-Brazzaville and Ethiopia. The team finished 2nd in the group, beating both Ethiopia and Congo-Brazzaville with a score of 5-0 but lost to South Africa.

The national team continued to compete in the next few editions of the African Mixed Team Championships and later African Games in 2015. The Motswana team placed 3rd in Group 2 and failed to qualify for the quarter-finals.

== Competitive record ==
=== Thomas Cup ===
Year	Round	Pos
1949 to 1964	Part of the United Kingdom	
1967 to 1992	Did not enter	
1994	Withdrew	
1996	Did not enter	
1998	Did not qualify	
2000	Did not enter	
2002	Did not enter	
2004	Did not qualify	
2006	Did not enter	
2008	Did not enter	
2010	Did not enter	
2012	Did not enter	
2014	Did not enter	
2016	Did not enter	
2018	Did not enter	
2020	Did not enter	
2022	Did not enter	
2024	Did not enter	
2026	Did not qualify	
2028	To be determined	
2030	To be determined	

=== Uber Cup ===
Year	Round	Pos
1957 to 1966	Part of the United Kingdom	
1969 to 2002	Did not enter	
2004	Did not qualify	
2006	Did not enter	
2008	Did not enter	
2010	Did not enter	
2012	Did not enter	
2014	Did not enter	
2016	Did not enter	
2018	Did not enter	
2020	Did not enter	
2022	Did not enter	
2024	Did not enter	
2026	Did not qualify	
2028	To be determined	
2030	To be determined	

=== Sudirman Cup ===
Year	Round	Pos
1989 to 2021	Did not enter	
2023	Did not qualify	
2025	To be determined	
2027	To be determined	
2029	To be determined	

=== Commonwealth Games ===
==== Men's team ====
Year	Round	Pos
1998	Did not enter	

==== Women's team ====
Year	Round	Pos
1998	Did not enter	

==== Mixed team ====
Year	Round	Pos
1978 to 2022	Did not enter	
2026	To be determined	

=== African Games ===
==== Mixed team ====
Year	Round	Pos
2003	Did not enter	
2007	Did not enter	
2011	Group stage	
2015	Group stage	
2019	Did not enter	
2027	To be determined	

=== African Team Championships ===
==== Men's team ====
Year	Round	Pos
1979 to 2024	Did not enter	
2026	Group stage	10th
2028	To be determined	
2030	To be determined	

==== Women's team ====
Year	Round	Pos
1979 to 2024	Did not enter	
2026	Group stage	7th
2028	To be determined	
2030	To be determined	

==== Mixed team ====
Year	Round	Pos
1980 to 1992	Did not enter	
1994	Group stage	
1998	Group stage	
2000	Group stage	6th
2002	Group stage	
2004	Group stage	
2006	Group stage	
2007	Group stage	
2009	Group stage	
2011	Group stage	
2013	Group stage	
2014	Group stage	
2017	Group stage	
2019	Did not enter	
2021	Group stage	8th
2023	Group stage	11th
2025	TBD	
2027	TBD	
2029	TBD	

=== FISU World University Games ===
==== Mixed team ====
Year	Round	Pos
2007	Did not enter	
2011	Did not enter	
2013	Did not enter	
2015	Did not enter	
2017	Group stage	26th
2021	Did not enter	
2025	TBD	

=== World University Team Championships ===
==== Mixed team ====
Year	Round	Pos
2008	Did not enter	
2010	Did not enter	
2012	Did not enter	
2014	Did not enter	
2016	Did not enter	
2018	Did not enter	

**Red border color indicates tournament was held on home soil.

== Junior competitive record ==
=== Suhandinata Cup ===
Year	Round	Pos
2000	Did not enter	
2002	Did not enter	
2004	Did not enter	
2006	Did not enter	
2007	Did not enter	
2008	Did not enter	
2009	Did not enter	
2010	Did not enter	
2011	Did not enter	
2012	Did not enter	
2013	Group stage	28th
2014	Group stage	24th
2015	Did not enter	
2016	Did not enter	
2017	Did not enter	
2018	Did not enter	
2019	Did not enter	
2022	Did not enter	
2023	Did not enter	
2024	TBD	

=== African Youth Games ===
==== Men's team ====
Year	Round	Pos
2018	Did not enter	

==== Women's team ====
Year	Round	Pos
2018	Did not enter	

==== Mixed team ====
Year	Round	Pos
2014	Group stage	8th

=== African Junior Team Championships ===
==== Mixed team ====
Year	Round	Pos
1979 to 1995	Did not enter	
1997	Group stage	5th
1999	Did not enter	
2001	Did not enter	
2003	Group stage	7th
2005	Did not enter	
2007	Group stage	6th
2009	Group stage	7th
2011	Withdrew	
2013	Group stage	
2016	Did not enter	
2021	Group stage	7th
2022	Did not enter	

**Red border color indicates tournament was held on home soil.

== Staff ==
The following list shows the coaching staff for the Botswana national badminton team.

Name	Role
(Botswana) Ookeditse Thela	Head coach
(Botswana) Harold Ndaba	Coach
(Botswana) Muniovandu Kandjou	Junior coach

== Players ==
=== Current squad ===
As of 2 January 2024

==== Men's team ====
Name	DoB/Age	Ranking of event		
Name	DoB/Age	MS	MD	XD
Tshimologo Rasta	1 January 1995 (age 31)	852	941	740
Tsamorena Kgosidialwa	1 February 1998 (age 28)	1551	1091	1160
Tumelo Moilwa	12 September 2001 (age 24)	1623	941	1123
Modiri Motshegwe	22 October 2002 (age 23)	862	941	1160

==== Women's team ====
Name	DoB/Age	Ranking of event		
Name	DoB/Age	WS	WD	XD
Tebogo Ndzinge	28 February 1993 (age 33)	675	766	1160
Keletso Ntebela	5 January 2001 (age 25)	-	860	1123
Tsholofelo Willie	25 August 2001 (age 24)	768	-	1079
Tessa Kabelo	10 September 1996 (age 29)	514	766	740

=== Previous squads ===
- African Mixed Team Badminton Championships: (2011, 2013, 2014, 2017, 2021)
- African Games: (2015)
