= 2022 African Junior Badminton Championships =

Tournament details
- Dates: 12–14 December (Team event); 15–17 December (Individual event)
- Edition: 14th
- Venue: National Badminton Centre
- Location: Beau Bassin-Rose Hill, Mauritius

The 2022 African Junior Badminton Championships were the continental badminton championships to crown the best youth players and teams across Africa. The tournament was held at the National Badminton Centre in Rose Hill, Mauritius, from 12 to 17 December 2022.

== Tournament ==
The 2022 African Junior Badminton Championships were held in two separate events. The mixed team event, officially All Africa U-19 Mixed Team Championships 2022, was a continental tournament to crown the best team in Africa. A total of 7 countries across Africa registered their players to compete at mixed team event.

The individual event, officially All Africa U-19 Individual Championships 2022, was a continental tournament to crown the best players in Africa holding from 15 to 17 December.

=== Venue ===
This tournament was held at the National Badminton Centre in Rose Hill with three courts.

== Medalists ==
Event	Gold	Silver	Bronze
Teams	Mauritius; Lucas Douce; Mohammad Rayan Shanawaz; Khemtish Nundah; Hanuman Pravish; Raul Teeluck; Aidan Yu Kiat; Godavri Ancharaz; Tiya Bhurtun; Layna Luxmi Chiniah; Chiara How Hong; Elsa How Hong; Reva Aditi Bhuruth	Algeria; Aimen Daoud; Mohamed Amine Chekkal; Tahar Skander Medel; Yacine Laichi; Nihad Benhoua; Rosa Mamache; Deloum Riham; Anaelle Thomassin	Egypt; Mohamed Hegazy; Moaz Hesham Hassan; Youssif Mohamed; Seif Omar; Jana Abdelkader; Ganna Elwazery; Jana Ghamry; Reem Hussein
Teams	Mauritius; Lucas Douce; Mohammad Rayan Shanawaz; Khemtish Nundah; Hanuman Pravish; Raul Teeluck; Aidan Yu Kiat; Godavri Ancharaz; Tiya Bhurtun; Layna Luxmi Chiniah; Chiara How Hong; Elsa How Hong; Reva Aditi Bhuruth	Algeria; Aimen Daoud; Mohamed Amine Chekkal; Tahar Skander Medel; Yacine Laichi; Nihad Benhoua; Rosa Mamache; Deloum Riham; Anaelle Thomassin	Uganda; Abed Bukenya; Guna Kusal Dhulupudi; Fadilah Mohamed Rafi; Tracy Naluwooza
Boys' singles	(Mauritius) Khemtish Rai Nundah	(Mauritius) Lucas Douce	(Réunion) Aaron Nassing
Boys' singles	(Mauritius) Khemtish Rai Nundah	(Mauritius) Lucas Douce	(Egypt) Youssif Mohamed
Girls' singles	(Uganda) Fadilah Mohamed Rafi	(Uganda) Tracy Naluwooza	(Egypt) Jana Abdelkader
Girls' singles	(Uganda) Fadilah Mohamed Rafi	(Uganda) Tracy Naluwooza	(Mauritius) Tiya Bhurtun
Boys' doubles	(Egypt) Mohamed Hegazy (Egypt) Youssif Mohamed	(Mauritius) Douce Lucas (Mauritius) Khemtish Rai Nundah	(Réunion) Aaron Nassing (Réunion) Hugo Constans
Boys' doubles	(Egypt) Mohamed Hegazy (Egypt) Youssif Mohamed	(Mauritius) Douce Lucas (Mauritius) Khemtish Rai Nundah	(Mauritius) Jason Francois (Mauritius) Hanuman Pravish
Girls' doubles	(Uganda) Fadilah Mohamed Rafi (Uganda) Tracy Naluwooza	(South Africa) Michaela Ohlson (South Africa) Tamsyn Smith	(Egypt) Jana Abdelkader (Egypt) Ganna Elwazery
Girls' doubles	(Uganda) Fadilah Mohamed Rafi (Uganda) Tracy Naluwooza	(South Africa) Michaela Ohlson (South Africa) Tamsyn Smith	(Mauritius) Tiya Bhurtun (Mauritius) Layna Luxmi Chiniah
Mixed doubles	(Uganda) Abed Bukenya (Uganda) Fadilah Mohamed Rafi	(Mauritius) Khemtish Rai Nundah (Mauritius) Tiya Bhurtun	(Mauritius) Lucas Douce (Mauritius) Layna Luxmi Chiniah
Mixed doubles	(Uganda) Abed Bukenya (Uganda) Fadilah Mohamed Rafi	(Mauritius) Khemtish Rai Nundah (Mauritius) Tiya Bhurtun	(Mauritius) Pravish Hanuman (Mauritius) Reva Aditi Bhuruth

=== Medal table ===
* Host nation (Mauritius)

Rank	Nation	Gold	Silver	Bronze	Total
1	Uganda	3	1	1	5
2	Mauritius*	2	3	5	10
3	Egypt	1	0	4	5
4	Algeria	0	1	0	1
4	South Africa	0	1	0	1
6	Réunion	0	0	2	2
Totals (6 entries)		6	6	12	24

== Team event ==
=== Group A ===
Pos	Team	Pld	Pts
1	Uganda	2	2
2	Mauritius (H)	2	1
3	Réunion	2	0

Source: tournamentsoftware.com
(H) Host

12 December 2022
Uganda	4–1	Réunion
13 December 2022
Mauritius	4–1	Réunion
13 December 2022
Mauritius	2–3	Uganda

=== Group B ===
Pos	Team	Pld	Pts
1	Egypt	3	3
2	Algeria	3	2
3	South Africa	3	1
4	Zambia	3	0

Source: tournamentsoftware.com

12 December 2022
Algeria	3–2	South Africa
12 December 2022
Egypt	4–1	Zambia
12 December 2022
South Africa	4–1	Zambia
13 December 2022
Egypt	5–0	Algeria
13 December 2022
South Africa	2–3	Egypt
13 December 2022
Algeria	4–1	Zambia

=== Knockout stage ===
Semi-finals
Uganda	1
Algeria	3
Mauritius	3
Egypt	1

Final
Algeria	0
Mauritius	3

==== Semi-finals ====
Algeria
3
National Badminton Centre, Court 2
14 December 2022, 09:00 UTC+4

Uganda
1

			1	2	3
1	(Algeria) (Uganda)	Aimen Daoud / Anaelle Thomassin; Abed Bukenya / Fadilah Mohamed Rafi	21; 17	19; 21	21; 17
2	(Algeria) (Uganda)	Tahar Skander Medel; Guna Kusal Dhulupudi	21; 19	21; 19
3	(Algeria) (Uganda)	Nihad Benhoua; Tracy Naluwooza	16; 21	6; 21
4	(Algeria) (Uganda)	Aimen Daoud / Tahar Skander Medel; Abed Bukenya / Guna Kusal Dhulupudi	21; 10	20; 22	21; 15
5	(Algeria) (Uganda)	Nihad Benhoua / Rosa Mamache; Fadilah Mohamed Rafi / Tracy Naluwooza				not played

Egypt
1
National Badminton Centre, Court 1
14 December 2022, 09:00 UTC+4

Mauritius
3

			1	2	3
1	(Egypt) (Mauritius)	Mohamed Hegazy / Ganna Elwazery; Lucas Douce / Layna Luxmi Chiniah	15; 21	21; 18	16; 21
2	(Egypt) (Mauritius)	Seif Omar; Khemtish Nundah	18; 21	13; 21
3	(Egypt) (Mauritius)	Jana Abdelkader; Tiya Bhurtun	20; 22	21; 10	21; 14
4	(Egypt) (Mauritius)	Mohamed Hegazy / Youssif Mohamed; Lucas Douce / Khemtish Nundah	14; 21	16; 21
5	(Egypt) (Mauritius)	Jana Abdelkader / Ganna Elwazery; Tiya Bhurtun / Reva Aditi Bhuruth				not played

==== Final ====
Mauritius
3
National Badminton Centre, Court 1
14 December 2022, 18:00 UTC+4

Algeria
1

			1	2	3
1	(Mauritius) (Algeria)	Lucas Douce / Layna Luxmi Chiniah; Aimen Daoud / Anaelle Thomassin	23; 21	21; 15
2	(Mauritius) (Algeria)	Khemtish Nundah; Tahar Skander Medel	21; 12	21; 10
3	(Mauritius) (Algeria)	Tiya Bhurtun; Nihad Benhoua	21; 13	21; 11
4	(Mauritius) (Algeria)	Lucas Douce / Khemtish Nundah; Aimen Daoud / Tahar Skander Medel				not played
5	(Mauritius) (Algeria)	Tiya Bhurtun / Layna Luxmi Chiniah; Rosa Mamache / Anaelle Thomassin				not played

=== Final ranking ===
Pos	Team	Pld	W	L	Pts	MD	Final result
1st place, gold medalist(s)	Mauritius	4	4	0	4	+7	Champions
2nd place, silver medalist(s)	Algeria	5	3	2	3	−1	Runners-up
3rd place, bronze medalist(s)	Egypt	4	3	1	3	+9	Eliminated in semi-finals
3rd place, bronze medalist(s)	Uganda	3	2	1	2	+2	Eliminated in semi-finals
5	South Africa	3	1	2	1	+4	Eliminated in group stage
6	Réunion	2	0	2	0	−6	Eliminated in group stage
7	Zambia	3	0	3	0	−9	Eliminated in group stage

== Individual event ==
=== Boys' singles ===
Semifinals
(Réunion) Aaron Assing	15	14
3	(Mauritius) Khemtish Nundah	21	21
4	(Egypt) Youssif Mohamed	14	13
(Mauritius) Lucas Douce	21	21

Final
3	(Mauritius) Khemtish Nundah	21	21
(Mauritius) Lucas Douce	9	16

=== Girls' singles ===
Semifinals
1	(Uganda) Fadilah Mohamed Rafi	21	21
(Mauritius) Tiya Bhurtun	9	16
3	(Uganda) Tracy Naluwooza	21	21
2	(Egypt) Jana Abdelkader	14	17

Final
1	(Uganda) Fadilah Mohamed Rafi	21	21
3	(Uganda) Tracy Naluwooza	16	15

=== Boys' doubles ===
Semifinals
1	(Mauritius) Lucas Douce (Mauritius) Khemtish Nundah	21	21
(Réunion) Aaron Assing (Réunion) Hugo Constans	17	17
(Mauritius) Jason François (Mauritius) Hanuman Pravish	21	16	15
(Egypt) Mohamed Hegazy (Egypt) Youssif Mohamed	18	21	21

Final
1	(Mauritius) Lucas Douce (Mauritius) Khemtish Nundah	15	16
(Egypt) Mohamed Hegazy (Egypt) Youssif Mohamed	21	21

=== Girls' doubles ===
Semifinals
1	(Uganda) Fadilah Mohamed Rafi (Uganda) Tracy Naluwooza	21	21
(Egypt) Jana Abdelkader (Egypt) Ganna Elwazery	19	14
(South Africa) Michaela Ohlson (South Africa) Tamsyn Smith	21	22	21
2	(Mauritius) Tiya Bhurtun (Mauritius) Layna Luxmi Chiniah	11	24	17

Final
1	(Uganda) Fadilah Mohamed Rafi (Uganda) Tracy Naluwooza	21	21
(South Africa) Michaela Ohlson (South Africa) Tamsyn Smith	15	17

=== Mixed doubles ===
Semifinals
1	(Uganda) Abed Bukenya (Uganda) Fadilah Mohamed Rafi	22	21	21
3	(Mauritius) Lucas Douce (Mauritius) Layna Luxmi Chiniah	24	16	17
(Mauritius) Hanuman Pravish (Mauritius) Reva Aditi Bhuruth	11	16
2	(Mauritius) Khemtish Nundah (Mauritius) Tiya Bhurtun	21	21

Final
1	(Uganda) Abed Bukenya (Uganda) Fadilah Mohamed Rafi	21	17	21
2	(Mauritius) Khemtish Nundah (Mauritius) Tiya Bhurtun	19	21	17
