= Badminton at the 2015 Indian Ocean Island Games =

Badminton at the 2015 Indian Ocean Island Games was held at Gymnase Michel Debré, Saint-André, Réunion.

== Medalists ==
Event	Gold	Silver	Bronze
Men's singles	Julien Paul; Mauritius	Didier Nourry; Réunion	Loïc Bertil; Réunion
Men's singles	Julien Paul; Mauritius	Didier Nourry; Réunion	Mohamed Ajfan Rasheed; Maldives
Women's singles	Kate Foo Kune; Mauritius	Alisen Camille; Seychelles	Nicki Chan-Lam; Mauritius
Women's singles	Kate Foo Kune; Mauritius	Alisen Camille; Seychelles	Juliette Ah-Wan; Seychelles
Men's doubles	Mauritius (MRI); Aatish Lubah; Julien Paul	Réunion (RUN); Xavier Chan Fung Ting; Sébastien Laude	Mauritius (MRI); Sahir Edoo; Yoni Louison
Men's doubles	Mauritius (MRI); Aatish Lubah; Julien Paul	Réunion (RUN); Xavier Chan Fung Ting; Sébastien Laude	Seychelles (SEY); Georgie Cupidon; Steve Malcouzanne
Women's doubles	Mauritius (MRI); Kate Foo Kune; Yeldy Louison	Seychelles (SEY); Alisen Camille; Juliette Ah-Wan	Réunion (RUN); Audrey Lebon; Mélodie Parrot
Women's doubles	Mauritius (MRI); Kate Foo Kune; Yeldy Louison	Seychelles (SEY); Alisen Camille; Juliette Ah-Wan	Mauritius (MRI); Shama Aboobakar; Nicki Chan-Lam
Mixed doubles	Mauritius (MRI); Sahir Edoo; Yeldy Louison	Mauritius (MRI); Julien Paul; Kate Foo Kune	Mauritius (MRI); Christopher Paul; Shama Aboobakar
Mixed doubles	Mauritius (MRI); Sahir Edoo; Yeldy Louison	Mauritius (MRI); Julien Paul; Kate Foo Kune	Seychelles (SEY); Georgie Cupidon; Juliette Ah-Wan
Men's team	Mauritius (MRI)	Maldives (MDV)	Réunion (RUN)
Men's team	Mauritius (MRI)	Maldives (MDV)	Seychelles (SEY)
Women's team	Mauritius (MRI)	Seychelles (SEY)	Réunion (RUN)
Women's team	Mauritius (MRI)	Seychelles (SEY)	Maldives (MDV)
