= 2018 All Africa Men's and Women's Team Badminton Championships =

Tournament details
- Dates: 12–15 February
- Venue: Hacène Harcha Arena
- Location: Algiers, Algeria

The 2018 All Africa Men's and Women's Team Badminton Championships is a continental stage tournament of Thomas and Uber Cups, and also to crown the best men's and women's badminton team in Africa. This tournament will be held in Algiers, Algeria between 12 and 15 February 2018.

== Medalists ==
Event	Gold	Silver	Bronze
Men's team	Algeria; Adel Hamek; Adel Meddah; Koceila Mammeri; Majed Yacine Balahoune; Mohamed Abdelaziz Ouchefoun; Mohamed Abderrahime Belarbi; Samy Khaldi; Sifeddine Larbaoui; Youcef Sabri Medel	Nigeria; Anuoluwapo Juwon Opeyori; Clement Krobakpo; Enejoh Abah; Godwin Olofua; Habeeb Bello; Usman Ayo Isiaq	Mauritius; Aatish Lubah; Christopher Paul; Julien Paul; Jean Bernard Bongout; Melvin Appiah; Tejraj Pultoo
Men's team	Algeria; Adel Hamek; Adel Meddah; Koceila Mammeri; Majed Yacine Balahoune; Mohamed Abdelaziz Ouchefoun; Mohamed Abderrahime Belarbi; Samy Khaldi; Sifeddine Larbaoui; Youcef Sabri Medel	Nigeria; Anuoluwapo Juwon Opeyori; Clement Krobakpo; Enejoh Abah; Godwin Olofua; Habeeb Bello; Usman Ayo Isiaq	Ghana; Abraham Ayittey; Aaron Tamakloe; Daniel Sam; Emmanuel Botwe; Emmanuel Donkor; Michael Opoku Baah
Women's team	Mauritius; Aurélie Allet; Ganesha Mungrah; Kate Foo Kune; Kobita Dookhee; Nicki Chan-Lam; Sendila Mourat	Nigeria; Dorcas Ajoke Adesokan; Peace Orji; Uchechukwu Deborah Ukeh; Zainab Momoh	Egypt; Doha Hany; Hadia Hosny; Hana Hesham Mohamed; Hana Tarek Mohamed; Jana Ashraf; Salmeen Essam Elsaid Salem
Women's team	Mauritius; Aurélie Allet; Ganesha Mungrah; Kate Foo Kune; Kobita Dookhee; Nicki Chan-Lam; Sendila Mourat	Nigeria; Dorcas Ajoke Adesokan; Peace Orji; Uchechukwu Deborah Ukeh; Zainab Momoh	Algeria; Dounia Naama; Ferd Houda; Halla Bouksani; Imane Chekkal; Ines Ziani; Linda Mazri; Malak Ouchefoune; Sirine Ibrahim; Yasmina Chibah

== Tournament ==
The All Africa Men's and Women's Team Badminton Championships officially crowns the best male and female national badminton teams in Africa and at the same time works as the African qualification event towards the 2018 Thomas & Uber Cup finals. 19 teams consisting of 12 men's team and 7 women's team have entered the tournament.

=== Venue ===
Venue of this tournament is Salle OMS Hacène Harcha Arena, in Algiers, Algeria.

== Men's team ==
The host country, Algeria has been crowned the champion in the men's team event. The Algeria team beating Nigeria with the score 3–2, and Nigeria settle for the silver medal. It is the first time for Algeria to win the competition, and also will be the first time for the team to participate at the Thomas Cup final. The men's team bronze goes to Mauritius and Ghana. The team lose in the semifinal round to Algeria and Nigeria, both with the score 3–1 respectively.

=== Group stage ===
==== Group A ====
Pos	Team	Pld	W	L	MF	MA	MD	GF	GA	GD	PF	PA	PD	Pts	Qualification
1	Mauritius	1	1	0	5	0	+5	10	0	+10	210	78	+132	1	Knockout stage
2	Cameroon	2	1	1	5	5	0	10	10	0	288	251	+37	1	Knockout stage
3	Tunisia	1	0	1	0	5	−5	0	10	−10	41	210	−169	0	

Source: TS

Date		Score		Match 1	Match 2	Match 3	Match 4	Match 5
12 Feb	Mauritius	w/o	Tunisia	—	—	—	—	—
13 Feb	Cameroon	5–0	Tunisia	2–0	2–0	2–0	2–0	2–0
13 Feb	Mauritius	5–0	Cameroon	2–0	2–0	2–0	2–0	2–0

- Mauritius vs Tunisia

Mauritius
Walkover
Salle OMS Hacène Harcha Arena, Court 7
12 February 2018, 15:30

Tunisia
-

			1	2	3
1	(Mauritius) (Tunisia)	Julien Paul; Youssef Hafouz				w/o
2	(Mauritius) (Tunisia)	Aatish Lubah; Yessine Vydelingum				w/o
3	(Mauritius) (Tunisia)	Jean Bernard Bongout; Younes Hafouz				w/o
4	(Mauritius) (Tunisia)	Melvin Appiah / Tejraj Pultoo; Youssef Hafouz / Yessine Vydelingum				w/o
5	(Mauritius) (Tunisia)	Aatish Lubah / Christopher Paul; Amin Abidi / Youssef Hafouz				w/o

- Cameroon vs Tunisia

Cameroon
5
Salle OMS Hacène Harcha Arena, Court 6
13 February 2018, 15:30

Tunisia
0

			1	2	3
1	(Cameroon) (Tunisia)	Mamoudou Soudi; Youssef Hafouz	21; 7	21; 3
2	(Cameroon) (Tunisia)	Antoine Owona; Yessine Vydelingum	21; 2	21; 3
3	(Cameroon) (Tunisia)	Paulin Nguele Biya; Younes Hafouz	21; 2	21; 2
4	(Cameroon) (Tunisia)	Paulin Nguele Biya / Antoine Owona; Youssef Hafouz / Yessine Vydelingum	21; 6	21; 3
5	(Cameroon) (Tunisia)	Paul Henri Assembe / Mamoudou Soudi; Amin Abidi / Youssef Hafouz	21; 5	21; 8

- Mauritius vs Cameroon

Mauritius
5
Salle OMS Hacène Harcha Arena, Court 7
13 February 2018, 17:30

Cameroon
0

			1	2	3
1	(Mauritius) (Cameroon)	Julien Paul; Mamoudou Soudi	21; 10	21; 8
2	(Mauritius) (Cameroon)	Aatish Lubah; Antoine Owona	21; 4	21; 7
3	(Mauritius) (Cameroon)	Jean Bernard Bongout; Paulin Nguele Biya	21; 11	21; 6
4	(Mauritius) (Cameroon)	Melvin Appiah / Tejraj Pultoo; Paulin Nguele Biya / Antoine Owona	21; 12	21; 8
5	(Mauritius) (Cameroon)	Aatish Lubah / Christopher Paul; Paul Henri Assembe / Mamoudou Soudi	21; 7	21; 5

==== Group B ====
Pos	Team	Pld	W	L	MF	MA	MD	GF	GA	GD	PF	PA	PD	Pts	Qualification
1	Algeria	2	2	0	9	1	+8	18	2	+16	378	241	+137	2	Knockout stage
2	Zambia	2	1	1	6	4	+2	12	9	+3	380	295	+85	1	Knockout stage
3	Ivory Coast	2	0	2	0	10	−10	1	20	−19	215	437	−222	0	

Source: TS

Date		Score		Match 1	Match 2	Match 3	Match 4	Match 5
12 Feb	Algeria	5–0	Ivory Coast	2–0	2–0	2–0	2–0	2–0
13 Feb	Zambia	5–0	Ivory Coast	2–0	2–0	2–0	2–0	2–1
13 Feb	Algeria	4–1	Zambia	2–0	2–0	2–0	0–2	2–0

- Algeria vs Ivory Coast

Algeria
5
Salle OMS Hacène Harcha Arena, Court 3
12 February 2018, 15:30

Ivory Coast
0

			1	2	3
1	(Algeria) (Ivory Coast)	Adel Hamek; Alex Patrick Zolobe	21; 11	21; 8
2	(Algeria) (Ivory Coast)	Mohamed Abderrahime Belarbi; Franck Ahi	21; 2	21; 5
3	(Algeria) (Ivory Coast)	Youcef Sabri Medel; Jerome Ibrahim Agnimel	21; 9	21; 12
4	(Algeria) (Ivory Coast)	Koceila Mammeri / Mohamed Abdelaziz Ouchefoun; Franck Ahi / Alex Patrick Zolobe	21; 6	21; 9
5	(Algeria) (Ivory Coast)	Yacine Belhouane / Samy Khaldi; Jerome Ibrahim Agnimel / Ousmane Ouedraogo	21; 9	21; 17

- Zambia vs Ivory Coast

Zambia
5
Salle OMS Hacène Harcha Arena, Court 4
13 February 2018, 09:30

Ivory Coast
0

			1	2	3
1	(Zambia) (Ivory Coast)	Chongo Mulenga; Alex Patrick Zolobe	21; 13	21; 11
2	(Zambia) (Ivory Coast)	Kalombo Mulenga; Franck Ahi	21; 7	21; 6
3	(Zambia) (Ivory Coast)	Mark Banda; Jerome Ibrahim Agnimel	21; 10	21; 10
4	(Zambia) (Ivory Coast)	Chongo Mulenga / Kalombo Mulenga; Jerome Ibrahim Agnimel / Ousmane Ouedraogo	21; 13	21; 11
5	(Zambia) (Ivory Coast)	Mark Banda / Donald Mabo; Franck Ahi / Alex Patrick Zolobe	17; 21	21; 16	21; 9

- Algeria vs Zambia

Algeria
4
Salle OMS Hacène Harcha Arena, Court 1
13 February 2018, 17:30

Zambia
1

			1	2	3
1	(Algeria) (Zambia)	Adel Hamek; Chongo Mulenga	21; 14	21; 18
2	(Algeria) (Zambia)	Mohamed Abderrahime Belarbi; Kalombo Mulenga	21; 12	21; 9
3	(Algeria) (Zambia)	Sifeddine Larbaoui; Mark Banda	21; 14	21; 16
4	(Algeria) (Zambia)	Mohamed Abderrahime Belarbi / Adel Hamek; Chongo Mulenga / Kalombo Mulenga				w/o
5	(Algeria) (Zambia)	Koceila Mammeri / Youcef Sabri Medel; Mark Banda / Donald Mabo	21; 10	21; 18

==== Group C ====
Pos	Team	Pld	W	L	MF	MA	MD	GF	GA	GD	PF	PA	PD	Pts	Qualification
1	Nigeria	2	2	0	10	0	+10	20	3	+17	464	273	+191	2	Knockout stage
2	Morocco	2	1	1	3	7	−4	8	14	−6	327	407	−80	1	Knockout stage
3	Seychelles	2	0	2	2	8	−6	6	17	−11	330	441	−111	0	

Source: TS

Date		Score		Match 1	Match 2	Match 3	Match 4	Match 5
12 Feb	Nigeria	5–0	Morocco	1–2	2–0	2–0	2–0	2–0
13 Feb	Seychelles	2–3	Morocco	0–2	2–1	0–2	2–0	0–2
13 Feb	Nigeria	5–0	Seychelles	2–1	2–0	2–0	2–1	2–0

- Nigeria vs Morocco

Nigeria
5
Salle OMS Hacène Harcha Arena, Court 4
12 February 2018, 15:30

Morocco
0

			1	2	3
1	(Nigeria) (Morocco)	Clement Krobakpo; Bilal El-Harab	12; 21	21; 16	21; 13
2	(Nigeria) (Morocco)	Anuoluwapo Juwon Opeyori; Ahmed Amine Ksikes	21; 1	21; 6
3	(Nigeria) (Morocco)	Godwin Olofua; Yassine El-Mernissi	21; 12	21; 13
4	(Nigeria) (Morocco)	Enejoh Abah / Clement Krobakpo; Adam El-Mernissi / Ahmed Amine Ksikes	21; 12	21; 3
5	(Nigeria) (Morocco)	Habeeb Bello / Usman Isiaq; Bilal El-Harab / Yassine El-Mernissi	21; 18	21; 13

- Seychelles vs Morocco

Seychelles
2
Salle OMS Hacène Harcha Arena, Court 7
13 February 2018, 09:30

Morocco
3

			1	2	3
1	(Seychelles) (Morocco)	Kervin Ghislain; Bilal El-Harab	18; 21	17; 21
2	(Seychelles) (Morocco)	Jie Luo; Ahmed Amine Ksikes	21; 17	14; 21	21; 16
3	(Seychelles) (Morocco)	Jakim Renaud; Yassine El-Mernissi	14; 21	10; 21
4	(Seychelles) (Morocco)	Kervin Ghislain / Steve Malcouzanne; Adam El-Mernissi / Ahmed Amine Ksikes	21; 11	21; 8
5	(Seychelles) (Morocco)	Jie Luo / Jakim Renaud; Bilal El-Harab / Yassine El-Mernissi	16; 21	12; 21

- Nigeria vs Seychelles

Nigeria
5
Salle OMS Hacène Harcha Arena, Court 4
13 February 2018, 17:30

Seychelles
0

			1	2	3
1	(Nigeria) (Seychelles)	Habeeb Bello; Kervin Ghislain	21; 13	14; 21	21; 8
2	(Nigeria) (Seychelles)	Anuoluwapo Juwon Opeyori; Jie Luo	21; 9	21; 14
3	(Nigeria) (Seychelles)	Godwin Olofua; Jakim Renaud	21; 4	21; 6
4	(Nigeria) (Seychelles)	Habeeb Bello / Usman Isiaq; Kervin Ghislain / Steve Malcouzanne	21; 11	18; 21	21; 15
5	(Nigeria) (Seychelles)	Godwin Olofua / Anuoluwapo Juwon Opeyori; Jie Luo / Jakim Renaud	21; 14	21; 9

==== Group D ====
Pos	Team	Pld	W	L	MF	MA	MD	GF	GA	GD	PF	PA	PD	Pts	Qualification
1	Ghana	2	2	0	8	2	+6	16	6	+10	425	298	+127	2	Knockout stage
2	Egypt	2	1	1	7	3	+4	16	6	+10	435	305	+130	1	Knockout stage
3	Zimbabwe	2	0	2	0	10	−10	0	20	−20	163	420	−257	0	

Source: TS

Date		Score		Match 1	Match 2	Match 3	Match 4	Match 5
12 Feb	Egypt	5–0	Zimbabwe	2–0	2–0	2–0	2–0	2–0
13 Feb	Ghana	5–0	Zimbabwe	2–0	2–0	2–0	2–0	2–0
13 Feb	Egypt	2–3	Ghana	0–2	2–0	1–2	2–0	1–2

- Egypt vs Zimbabwe

Egypt
5
Salle OMS Hacène Harcha Arena, Court 7
12 February 2018, 15:30

Zimbabwe
0

			1	2	3
1	(Egypt) (Zimbabwe)	Ahmed Salah; Thabani Mathe	21; 9	21; 9
2	(Egypt) (Zimbabwe)	Abdelrahman Abdelhakim; Paul Kopolo	21; 13	21; 12
3	(Egypt) (Zimbabwe)	Mohamed Mostafa Kamel; Raffick Alfonso	21; 7	21; 8
4	(Egypt) (Zimbabwe)	Abdelrahman Abdelhakim / Ahmed Salah; Raffick Alfonso / Paul Kopolo	21; 1	21; 11
5	(Egypt) (Zimbabwe)	Adham Hatem Elgamal / Shady Mamdouh; Ashel Dziva / Thabani Mathe	21; 10	21; 10

- Ghana vs Zimbabwe

Ghana
5
Salle OMS Hacène Harcha Arena, Court 5
13 February 2018, 09:30

Zimbabwe
0

			1	2	3
1	(Ghana) (Zimbabwe)	Emmanuel Yaw Donkor; Thabani Mathe	21; 9	21; 9
2	(Ghana) (Zimbabwe)	Abraham Ayittey; Paul Kopolo	21; 9	21; 10
3	(Ghana) (Zimbabwe)	Daniel Sam; Raffick Alfonso	21; 5	21; 7
4	(Ghana) (Zimbabwe)	Abraham Ayittey / Michael Opoku Baah; Raffick Alfonso / Paul Kopolo	21; 11	21; 9
5	(Ghana) (Zimbabwe)	Emmanuel Yaw Donkor / Daniel Sam; Ashel Dziva / Thabani Mathe	21; 3	21; 6

- Egypt vs Ghana

Egypt
2
Salle OMS Hacène Harcha Arena, Court 3
13 February 2018, 17:30

Ghana
3

			1	2	3
1	(Egypt) (Ghana)	Ahmed Salah; Emmanuel Yaw Donkor	20; 22	15; 21
2	(Egypt) (Ghana)	Adham Hatem Elgamal; Abraham Ayittey	21; 15	21; 16
3	(Egypt) (Ghana)	Abdelrahman Abdelhakim; Daniel Sam	21; 14	15; 21	18; 21
4	(Egypt) (Ghana)	Abdelrahman Abdelhakim / Ahmed Salah; Abraham Ayittey / Michael Opoku Baah	21; 15	21; 10
5	(Egypt) (Ghana)	Adham Hatem Elgamal / Shady Mamdouh; Emmanuel Yaw Donkor / Daniel Sam	21; 15	9; 21	22; 24

=== Knockout stage ===
Quarter-finals
14 February
Mauritius	3
Zambia	0
14 February
Algeria	3
Cameroon	0
14 February
Egypt	2
Ghana	3
14 February
Morocco	0
Nigeria	3

Semi-finals
14 February
Mauritius	1
Algeria	3
14 February
Ghana	1
Nigeria	3

Final
15 February
Algeria	3
Nigeria	2

==== Quarter-finals ====
- Mauritius vs Zambia

Mauritius
3
Salle OMS Hacène Harcha Arena, Court 2
14 February 2018, 09:30

Zambia
0

			1	2	3
1	(Mauritius) (Zambia)	Julien Paul; Chongo Mulenga	21; 14	21; 10
2	(Mauritius) (Zambia)	Aatish Lubah; Kalombo Mulenga	20; 22	22; 20	21; 9
3	(Mauritius) (Zambia)	Jean Bernard Bongout; Mark Banda	21; 18	21; 9
4	(Mauritius) (Zambia)	Aatish Lubah / Julien Paul; Chongo Mulenga / Kalombo Mulenga				not played
5	(Mauritius) (Zambia)	Melvin Appiah / Christopher Paul; Mark Banda / Donald Mabo				not played

- Algeria vs Cameroon

Algeria
3
Salle OMS Hacène Harcha Arena, Court 3
14 February 2018, 09:30

Cameroon
0

			1	2	3
1	(Algeria) (Cameroon)	Mohamed Abderrahime Belarbi; Mamoudou Soudi	21; 5	21; 8
2	(Algeria) (Cameroon)	Youcef Sabri Medel; Antoine Owona	21; 12	21; 15
3	(Algeria) (Cameroon)	Koceila Mammeri; Paulin Nguele Biya	21; 10	21; 11
4	(Algeria) (Cameroon)	Sifeddine Larbaoui / Mohamed Abdelaziz Ouchefoun; Paulin Nguele Biya / Antoine Owona				not played
5	(Algeria) (Cameroon)	Yacine Belhouane / Samy Khaldi; Paul Henri Assembe / Mamoudou Soudi				not played

- Egypt vs Ghana

Egypt
2
Salle OMS Hacène Harcha Arena, Court 1
14 February 2018, 09:30

Ghana
3

			1	2	3
1	(Egypt) (Ghana)	Adham Hatem Elgamal; Emmanuel Yaw Donkor	22; 24	14; 21
2	(Egypt) (Ghana)	Abdelrahman Abdelhakim; Michael Opoku Baah	21; 11	21; 17
3	(Egypt) (Ghana)	Mohamed Mostafa Kamel; Daniel Sam	18; 21	23; 25
4	(Egypt) (Ghana)	Abdelrahman Abdelhakim / Ahmed Salah; Abraham Ayittey / Michael Opoku Baah	21; 12	21; 16
5	(Egypt) (Ghana)	Adham Hatem Elgamal / Shady Mamdouh; Emmanuel Yaw Donkor / Daniel Sam	19; 21	14; 21

- Morocco vs Nigeria

Morocco
0
Salle OMS Hacène Harcha Arena, Court 4
14 February 2018, 09:30

Nigeria
3

			1	2	3
1	(Morocco) (Nigeria)	Bilal El-Harab; Clement Krobakpo	16; 21	15; 21
2	(Morocco) (Nigeria)	Ahmed Amine Ksikes; Anuoluwapo Juwon Opeyori	9; 21	5; 21
3	(Morocco) (Nigeria)	Yassine El-Mernissi; Godwin Olofua	4; 21	5; 21
4	(Morocco) (Nigeria)	Adam El-Mernissi / Ahmed Amine Ksikes; Enejoh Abah / Clement Krobakpo				not played
5	(Morocco) (Nigeria)	Bilal El-Harab / Yassine El-Mernissi; Habeeb Bello / Usman Isiaq				not played

==== Semi-finals ====
- Mauritius vs Algeria

Mauritius
1
Salle OMS Hacène Harcha Arena, Court 1
14 February 2018, 09:30

Algeria
3

			1	2	3
1	(Mauritius) (Algeria)	Julien Paul; Mohamed Abderrahime Belarbi	22; 24	21; 14	21; 15
2	(Mauritius) (Algeria)	Aatish Lubah; Youcef Sabri Medel	15; 21	13; 21
3	(Mauritius) (Algeria)	Jean Bernard Bongout; Koceila Mammeri	14; 21	15; 21
4	(Mauritius) (Algeria)	Aatish Lubah / Julien Paul; Mohamed Abderrahime Belarbi / Youcef Sabri Medel	18; 21	15; 21
5	(Mauritius) (Algeria)	Melvin Appiah / Christopher Paul; Yacine Belhouane / Koceila Mammeri				not played

- Ghana vs Nigeria

Ghana
1
Salle OMS Hacène Harcha Arena, Court 4
14 February 2018, 09:30

Nigeria
3

			1	2	3
1	(Ghana) (Nigeria)	Emmanuel Yaw Donkor; Clement Krobakpo	10; 21	17; 21
2	(Ghana) (Nigeria)	Abraham Ayittey; Habeeb Bello	21; 19	21; 15
3	(Ghana) (Nigeria)	Daniel Sam; Anuoluwapo Juwon Opeyori	13; 21	16; 21
4	(Ghana) (Nigeria)	Abraham Ayittey / Michael Opoku Baah; Enejoh Abah / Clement Krobakpo	12; 21	13; 21
5	(Ghana) (Nigeria)	Emmanuel Yaw Donkor / Daniel Sam; Godwin Olofua / Anuoluwapo Juwon Opeyori				not played

==== Final ====
- Algeria vs Nigeria

Algeria
3
Salle OMS Hacène Harcha Arena, Court 1
14 February 2018, 09:30

Nigeria
2

			1	2	3
1	(Algeria) (Nigeria)	Mohamed Abderrahime Belarbi; Clement Krobakpo	21; 15	17; 21	19; 21
2	(Algeria) (Nigeria)	Youcef Sabri Medel; Anuoluwapo Juwon Opeyori	10; 21	21; 17	21; 14
3	(Algeria) (Nigeria)	Koceila Mammeri; Godwin Olofua	21; 17	21; 17
4	(Algeria) (Nigeria)	Mohamed Abderrahime Belarbi / Youcef Sabri Medel; Enejoh Abah / Clement Krobakpo	15; 21	19; 21
5	(Algeria) (Nigeria)	Yacine Belhouane / Koceila Mammeri; Godwin Olofua / Anuoluwapo Juwon Opeyori	21; 13	21; 15

== Women's team ==
The Mauritian women's team clinched the title and won the gold medal after beating the flagship country of African badminton, Nigeria. Under the coach from Malaysia, Krishnan Yogendran, Mauritius defeating Nigeria with the score 3–0. The Egypt and Algeria women's team were placed third in the competition and won the bronze medal. Both teams defeated in the semifinal by Nigeria and Mauritius with the score 3–2 respectively.

=== Group stage ===
==== Group A ====
Pos	Team	Pld	W	L	MF	MA	MD	GF	GA	GD	PF	PA	PD	Pts	Qualification
1	Nigeria	2	2	0	9	1	+8	19	2	+17	422	263	+159	2	Knockout stage
2	Algeria	2	1	1	5	5	0	10	11	−1	366	345	+21	1	Knockout stage
3	Uganda	2	0	2	1	9	−8	2	18	−16	233	413	−180	0	

Source: TS

Date		Score		Match 1	Match 2	Match 3	Match 4	Match 5
12 Feb	Nigeria	4–1	Algeria	2–0	1–2	2–0	2–0	2–0
13 Feb	Uganda	1–4	Algeria	0–2	0–2	0–2	0–2	2–0
13 Feb	Nigeria	5–0	Uganda	2–0	2–0	2–0	2–0	2–0

- Nigeria vs Algeria

Nigeria
4
Salle OMS Hacène Harcha Arena, Court 1
12 February 2018, 15:30

Algeria
1

			1	2	3
1	(Nigeria) (Algeria)	Dorcas Ajoke Adesokan; Linda Mazri	21; 12	21; 16
2	(Nigeria) (Algeria)	Zainab Momoh; Halla Bouksani	21; 18	12; 21	10; 21
3	(Nigeria) (Algeria)	Uchechukwu Deborah Ukeh; Malak Ouchefoun	21; 12	21; 8
4	(Nigeria) (Algeria)	Dorcas Ajoke Adesokan / Uchechukwu Deborah Ukeh; Linda Mazri / Dounia Naama	21; 15	21; 7
5	(Nigeria) (Algeria)	Zainab Momoh / Peace Orji; Halla Bouksani / Malak Ouchefoun	22; 20	21; 13

- Uganda vs Algeria

Uganda
1
Salle OMS Hacène Harcha Arena, Court 3
13 February 2018, 09:30

Algeria
4

			1	2	3
1	(Uganda) (Algeria)	Aisha Nakiyemba; Linda Mazri	14; 21	11; 21
2	(Uganda) (Algeria)	Gladys Mbabazi; Halla Bouksani	6; 21	3; 21
3	(Uganda) (Algeria)	Daisy Nakalyango; Malak Ouchefoun	7; 21	23; 25
4	(Uganda) (Algeria)	Gladys Mbabazi / Aisha Nakiyemba; Halla Bouksani / Linda Mazri	9; 21	18; 21
5	(Uganda) (Algeria)	Daisy Nakalyango / Meble Namakoye; Dounia Naama / Malak Ouchefoun	21; 15	21; 16

- Nigeria vs Uganda

Nigeria
5
Salle OMS Hacène Harcha Arena, Court 5
13 February 2018, 17:30

Uganda
0

			1	2	3
1	(Nigeria) (Uganda)	Dorcas Ajoke Adesokan; Aisha Nakiyemba	21; 8	21; 12
2	(Nigeria) (Uganda)	Zainab Momoh; Gladys Mbabazi	21; 11	21; 11
3	(Nigeria) (Uganda)	Uchechukwu Deborah Ukeh; Meble Namakoye	21; 4	21; 12
4	(Nigeria) (Uganda)	Dorcas Ajoke Adesokan / Uchechukwu Deborah Ukeh; Daisy Nakalyango / Aisha Nakiyemba	21; 4	21; 6
5	(Nigeria) (Uganda)	Zainab Momoh / Peace Orji; Gladys Mbabazi / Meble Namakoye	21; 14	21; 18

==== Group B ====
Pos	Team	Pld	W	L	MF	MA	MD	GF	GA	GD	PF	PA	PD	Pts	Qualification
1	Mauritius	3	3	0	13	2	+11	26	4	+22	589	340	+249	3	Knockout stage
2	Egypt	3	2	1	11	4	+7	23	9	+14	620	400	+220	2	Knockout stage
3	Ghana	3	1	2	6	9	−3	13	19	−6	495	516	−21	1	
4	Zimbabwe	3	0	3	0	15	−15	0	30	−30	182	630	−448	0	

Source: TS

Date		Score		Match 1	Match 2	Match 3	Match 4	Match 5
12 Feb	Egypt	4–1	Ghana	2–0	2–0	2–1	2–0	1–2
12 Feb	Mauritius	5–0	Zimbabwe	2–0	2–0	2–0	2–0	2–0
13 Feb	Egypt	5–0	Zimbabwe	2–0	2–0	2–0	2–0	2–0
13 Feb	Mauritius	5–0	Ghana	2–0	2–0	2–0	2–0	2–0
13 Feb	Egypt	2–3	Mauritius	0–2	2–0	0–2	2–0	0–2
13 Feb	Zimbabwe	0–5	Ghana	0–2	0–2	0–2	0–2	0–2

- Mauritius vs Zimbabwe

Mauritius
5
Salle OMS Hacène Harcha Arena, Court 2
12 February 2018, 15:30

Zimbabwe
0

			1	2	3
1	(Mauritius) (Zimbabwe)	Aurélie Allet; Kuzivakwashe Tritania Mudzamiri	21; 1	21; 1
2	(Mauritius) (Zimbabwe)	Kobita Dookhee; Olga Matsanura	21; 4	21; 7
3	(Mauritius) (Zimbabwe)	Nicki Chan-Lam; Audrey Matsanura	21; 4	21; 5
4	(Mauritius) (Zimbabwe)	Aurélie Allet / Kobita Dookhee; Nyasha Kopolo / Kuzivakwashe Tritania Mudzamiri	21; 6	21; 8
5	(Mauritius) (Zimbabwe)	Nicki Chan-Lam / Sendila Mourat; Audrey Matsanura / Olga Matsanura	21; 9	21; 11

- Egypt vs Ghana

Egypt
4
Salle OMS Hacène Harcha Arena, Court 5
12 February 2018, 15:30

Ghana
1

			1	2	3
1	(Egypt) (Ghana)	Hadia Hosny; Grace Atipaka	21; 9	21; 13
2	(Egypt) (Ghana)	Doha Hany; Stella Amasah	21; 8	21; 10
3	(Egypt) (Ghana)	Salmeen Essam Elsaid Salem; Gifty Mensah	21; 19	16; 21	21; 8
4	(Egypt) (Ghana)	Doha Hany / Hadia Hosny; Stella Amasah / Eyram Migbodzi	21; 11	21; 13
5	(Egypt) (Ghana)	Salmeen Essam Elsaid Salem / Hana Tarek; Grace Atipaka / Gifty Mensah	22; 24	21; 10	17; 21

- Mauritius vs Ghana

Mauritius
5
Salle OMS Hacène Harcha Arena, Court 1
13 February 2018, 09:30

Ghana
0

			1	2	3
1	(Mauritius) (Ghana)	Kate Foo Kune; Grace Atipaka	21; 9	21; 12
2	(Mauritius) (Ghana)	Aurélie Allet; Eyram Migbodzi	21; 8	21; 14
3	(Mauritius) (Ghana)	Nicki Chan-Lam; Stella Amasah	21; 16	21; 14
4	(Mauritius) (Ghana)	Aurélie Allet / Kobita Dookhee; Stella Amasah / Eyram Migbodzi	21; 18	21; 13
5	(Mauritius) (Ghana)	Nicki Chan-Lam / Kate Foo Kune; Grace Atipaka / Gifty Mensah	21; 7	21; 7

- Egypt vs Zimbabwe

Egypt
5
Salle OMS Hacène Harcha Arena, Court 2
13 February 2018, 09:30

Zimbabwe
0

			1	2	3
1	(Egypt) (Zimbabwe)	Doha Hany; Kuzivakwashe Tritania Mudzamiri	21; 6	21; 3
2	(Egypt) (Zimbabwe)	Jana Ashraf; Nyasha Kopolo	21; 7	21; 6
3	(Egypt) (Zimbabwe)	Hana Tarek; Olga Matsanura	21; 7	21; 4
4	(Egypt) (Zimbabwe)	Salmeen Essam Elsaid Salem / Doha Hany; Nyasha Kopolo / Kuzivakwashe Tritania Mudzamiri	21; 9	21; 6
5	(Egypt) (Zimbabwe)	Hadia Hosny / Hana Tarek; Audrey Matsanura / Olga Matsanura	21; 7	21; 9

- Egypt vs Mauritius

Egypt
2
Salle OMS Hacène Harcha Arena, Court 2
13 February 2018, 17:30

Mauritius
3

			1	2	3
1	(Egypt) (Mauritius)	Hadia Hosny; Kate Foo Kune	14; 21	11; 21
2	(Egypt) (Mauritius)	Doha Hany; Kobita Dookhee	21; 10	21; 11
3	(Egypt) (Mauritius)	Salmeen Essam Elsaid Salem; Nicki Chan-Lam	17; 21	14; 21
4	(Egypt) (Mauritius)	Doha Hany / Hadia Hosny; Aurélie Allet / Kobita Dookhee	21; 12	21; 10
5	(Egypt) (Mauritius)	Salmeen Essam Elsaid Salem / Hana Tarek; Nicki Chan-Lam / Kate Foo Kune	13; 21	13; 21

- Zimbabwe vs Ghana

Zimbabwe
0
Salle OMS Hacène Harcha Arena, Court 6
13 February 2018, 17:30

Ghana
5

			1	2	3
1	(Zimbabwe) (Ghana)	Kuzivakwashe Tritania Mudzamiri; Grace Atipaka	2; 21	2; 21
2	(Zimbabwe) (Ghana)	Nyasha Kopolo; Stella Amasah	9; 21	4; 21
3	(Zimbabwe) (Ghana)	Audrey Matsanura; Gifty Mensah	8; 21	2; 21
4	(Zimbabwe) (Ghana)	Kuzivakwashe Tritania Mudzamiri / Nyasha Kopolo; Stella Amasah / Eyram Migbodzi	11; 21	3; 21
5	(Zimbabwe) (Ghana)	Audrey Matsanura / Olga Matsanura; Grace Atipaka / Gifty Mensah	11; 21	10; 21

=== Knockout stage ===
Semi-finals
14 February
Nigeria	3
Egypt	2
14 February
Algeria	2
Mauritius	3

Final
15 February
Nigeria	0
Mauritius	3

==== Semi-finals ====
- Nigeria vs Egypt

Nigeria
3
Salle OMS Hacène Harcha Arena, Court 2
14 February 2014, 15:30

Egypt
2

			1	2	3
1	(Nigeria) (Egypt)	Dorcas Ajoke Adesokan; Hadia Hosny	17; 21	21; 7	21; 17
2	(Nigeria) (Egypt)	Zainab Momoh; Doha Hany	16; 21	21; 19	17; 21
3	(Nigeria) (Egypt)	Uchechukwu Deborah Ukeh; Salmeen Essam Elsaid Salem	21; 12	21; 8
4	(Nigeria) (Egypt)	Dorcas Ajoke Adesokan / Uchechukwu Deborah Ukeh; Doha Hany / Hadia Hosny	19; 21	21; 18	16; 21
5	(Nigeria) (Egypt)	Zainab Momoh / Peace Orji; Salmeen Essam Elsaid Salem / Hana Tarek	21; 9	21; 16

- Algeria vs Mauritius

Algeria
2
Salle OMS Hacène Harcha Arena, Court 3
14 February 2014, 15:30

Mauritius
3

			1	2	3
1	(Algeria) (Mauritius)	Linda Mazri; Kate Foo Kune	14; 21	13; 21
2	(Algeria) (Mauritius)	Halla Bouksani; Aurélie Allet	21; 15	21; 8
3	(Algeria) (Mauritius)	Malak Ouchefoun; Nicki Chan-Lam	21; 18	11; 21	17; 21
4	(Algeria) (Mauritius)	Halla Bouksani / Linda Mazri; Aurélie Allet / Kobita Dookhee	21; 19	21; 13
5	(Algeria) (Mauritius)	Dounia Naama / Malak Ouchefoun; Nicki Chan-Lam / Kate Foo Kune	13; 21	6; 21

==== Final ====
- Nigeria vs Mauritius

Nigeria
0
Salle OMS Hacène Harcha Arena, Court 2
15 February 2014, 15:30

Mauritius
3

			1	2	3
1	(Nigeria) (Mauritius)	Dorcas Ajoke Adesokan; Kate Foo Kune	15; 21	9; 21
2	(Nigeria) (Mauritius)	Zainab Momoh; Aurélie Allet	19; 21	19; 21
3	(Nigeria) (Mauritius)	Uchechukwu Deborah Ukeh; Nicki Chan-Lam	13; 21	14; 21
4	(Nigeria) (Mauritius)	Dorcas Ajoke Adesokan / Uchechukwu Deborah Ukeh; Aurélie Allet / Kobita Dookhee				not played
5	(Nigeria) (Mauritius)	Zainab Momoh / Peace Orji; Nicki Chan-Lam / Kate Foo Kune				not played
