= Zainab Momoh =

Nigerian badminton player

Personal information
- Born: 3 November 1996 (age 30)

Sport
- Country: Nigeria
- Sport: Badminton

Women's singles & doubles
- Highest ranking: 209 (WS 21 June 2018); 172 (WD 29 March 2018)
- BWF profile
Medal record
Women's badminton
Representing Nigeria
African Championships
Bronze medal – third place	2017 Benoni	Women's doubles
Bronze medal – third place	2017 Benoni	Mixed team
Bronze medal – third place	2018 Algiers	Women's doubles
Africa Team Championships
Silver medal – second place	2018 Algiers	Women's team
African Youth Games
Gold medal – first place	2014 Gaborone	Mixed team
Bronze medal – third place	2014 Gaborone	Mixed doubles

Zainab Momoh (born 3 November 1996) is a Nigerian badminton player. She is affiliated with Oyo State.

== Career ==
Momoh won the women's doubles bronze medals at the 2017 and 2018 African Championships.

== Achievements ==
=== African Championships ===
Women's doubles
Year	Venue	Partner	Opponent	Score	Result
2017	John Barrable Hall; Benoni, South Africa	(Nigeria) Dorcas Ajoke Adesokan	(Egypt) Doha Hany (Egypt) Hadia Hosny	4–21, 26–24, 18–21	Bronze
2018	Salle OMS Harcha Hacéne; Algiers, Algeria	(Nigeria) Peace Orji	(Egypt) Doha Hany (Egypt) Hadia Hosny	11–21, 11–21	Bronze

=== African Youth Games ===
Mixed doubles
Year	Venue	Partner	Opponent	Score	Result
2014	Otse Police College; Gaborone, Botswana	(Nigeria) Kingsley Nelson	(Mauritius) Julien Paul (Mauritius) Aurélie Allet	13–21, 14–21	Bronze

=== BWF International Challenge/Series ===
Women's doubles
Year	Tournament	Partner	Opponent	Score	Result
2017	Côte d'Ivoire International	(Nigeria) Peace Orji	(India) Simran Singhi (India) Ritika Thaker	11–21, 14–21	(silver) Runner-up
2017	Lagos International	(Nigeria) Ramatu Yakubu	(Sri Lanka) Thilini Hendahewa (Sri Lanka) Kavidi Sirimannage	8–21, 5–21	(silver) Runner-up

BWF International Challenge tournament
BWF International Series tournament
BWF Future Series tournament
