= 2018 African Badminton Championships =

Tournament details
- Dates: 16–18 February
- Edition: 21st
- Venue: Salle OMS Harcha Hacéne
- Location: Algiers, Algeria

The 2018 African Badminton Championships or All Africa Championships were held in Algiers, Algeria between 16-18 February, organised by the Badminton Confederation of Africa.

== Medalists ==
Event	Gold	Silver	Bronze
Men's singles	(Mauritius) Georges Paul	(Nigeria) Habeeb Temitope Bello	(Nigeria) Clement Krobakpo
Men's singles	(Mauritius) Georges Paul	(Nigeria) Habeeb Temitope Bello	(Mauritius) Aatish Lubah
Women's singles	(Mauritius) Kate Foo Kune	(Nigeria) Dorcas Ajoke Adesokan	(Egypt) Doha Hany
Women's singles	(Mauritius) Kate Foo Kune	(Nigeria) Dorcas Ajoke Adesokan	(Egypt) Hadia Hosny
Men's doubles	(Algeria) Mohamed Abderrahime Belarbi (Algeria) Adel Hamek	(Algeria) Koceila Mammeri (Algeria) Youcef Sabri Medel	(Mauritius) Jean Bernard Bongout (Mauritius) Christopher Paul
Men's doubles	(Algeria) Mohamed Abderrahime Belarbi (Algeria) Adel Hamek	(Algeria) Koceila Mammeri (Algeria) Youcef Sabri Medel	(Egypt) Abdelrahman Abdelhakim (Egypt) Ahmed Salah
Women's doubles	(Seychelles) Juliette Ah-Wan (Seychelles) Allisen Camille	(Egypt) Doha Hany (Egypt) Hadia Hosny	(Algeria) Halla Bouksani (Algeria) Linda Mazri
Women's doubles	(Seychelles) Juliette Ah-Wan (Seychelles) Allisen Camille	(Egypt) Doha Hany (Egypt) Hadia Hosny	(Nigeria) Zainab Momoh (Nigeria) Peace Orji
Mixed doubles	(Algeria) Koceila Mammeri (Algeria) Linda Mazri	(Nigeria) Enejoh Abah (Nigeria) Peace Orji	(Egypt) Adham Hatem Elgamal (Egypt) Doha Hany
Mixed doubles	(Algeria) Koceila Mammeri (Algeria) Linda Mazri	(Nigeria) Enejoh Abah (Nigeria) Peace Orji	(Egypt) Ahmed Salah (Egypt) Hadia Hosny

=== Medal table ===
* Host nation (Algeria)

Rank	Nation	Gold	Silver	Bronze	Total
1	Algeria*	2	1	1	4
2	Mauritius	2	0	2	4
3	Seychelles	1	0	0	1
4	Nigeria	0	3	2	5
5	Egypt	0	1	5	6
Totals (5 entries)		5	5	10	20

== Men's singles ==
=== Seeds ===
1. (Mauritius) Georges Paul (champion)
2. (Egypt) Ahmed Salah (third round)
3. (Egypt) Adham Hatem Elgamal (third round)
4. (Mauritius) Aatish Lubah (semifinals)
5. (Nigeria) Clement Krobakpo (semifinals)
6. (Egypt) Abdelrahman Abdelhakim (third round)
7. (Ghana) Emmanuel Donkor (quarterfinals)
8. (Nigeria) Habeeb Temitope Bello (final)

=== Finals ===
Quarterfinals
1	(Mauritius) Georges Paul	21	21
7	(Ghana) Emmanuel Donkor	19	16
(Nigeria) Anuoluwapo Juwon Opeyori	16	19
5	(Nigeria) Clement Krobakpo	21	21
(Zambia) Kalombo Mulenga	23	16	13
4	(Mauritius) Aatish Lubah	21	21	21
8	(Nigeria) Habeeb Temitope Bello	21	16	21
(Algeria) Youcef Sabri Medel	13	21	10

Semifinals
1	(Mauritius) Georges Paul	21	21
5	(Nigeria) Clement Krobakpo	13	13
4	(Mauritius) Aatish Lubah	14	24
8	(Nigeria) Habeeb Temitope Bello	21	26

Final
1	(Mauritius) Georges Paul	21	15	21
8	(Nigeria) Habeeb Temitope Bello	16	21	13

=== Top half ===
==== Section 1 ====
First Round
(Ivory Coast) A P Zolobe	2	12
(Ghana) A Ayittey	21	21
(Ivory Coast) O Ouedraogo	5	3
(Nigeria) G Olofua	21	21

Second Round
1	(Mauritius) G Paul	21	21
(Ghana) A Ayittey	10	11
(Cameroon) A E O Ndimako	9	10
(Nigeria) G Olofua	21	21

Third Round
1	(Mauritius) G Paul	21	21
(Nigeria) G Olofua	13	15

==== Section 2 ====
First Round
(Benin) R Razaki	5	8
(Algeria) A Hamek	21	21
(Zimbabwe) A Dziva	7	6
(Algeria) S Khaldi	21	21
(Zambia) C Mulenga	14	16
(Ghana) D Sam	21	21

Second Round
7	(Ghana) E Donkor	21	17	21
(Algeria) A Hamek	15	21	5
(Algeria) S Khaldi	12	18
(Ghana) D Sam	21	21

Third Round
7	(Ghana) E Donkor	21	21
(Ghana) D Sam	12	10

==== Section 3 ====
First Round
(Zimbabwe) P Kopolo	21	15	7
(Seychelles) K Ghislain	12	21	21
(Zambia) M Banda	10	15
(Mauritius) J B Bongout	21	21
(Mauritius) T Pultoo	10	7
(Nigeria) A J Opeyori	21	21

Second Round
3	(Egypt) A H Elgamal	21	21
(Seychelles) K Ghislain	19	18
(Mauritius) J B Bongout	10	11
(Nigeria) A J Opeyori	21	21

Third Round
3	(Egypt) A H Elgamal	18	21	18
(Nigeria) A J Opeyori	21	19	21

==== Section 4 ====
First Round
(Cameroon) P H A Bloch	10	4
(Egypt) M M Kamel	21	21
(Ivory Coast) A J I Agnimel	12	12
(Egypt) S Mamdouh	21	21
(Mauritius) M Appiah	22	21
(Morocco) A A Ksikes	20	13

Second Round
5	(Nigeria) C Krobakpo	21	21
(Egypt) M M Kamel	15	15
(Egypt) S Mamdouh	21	21
(Mauritius) M Appiah	18	13

Third Round
5	(Nigeria) C Krobakpo	21	21
(Egypt) S Mamdouh	13	8

=== Bottom half ===
==== Section 5 ====
First Round
(Sudan) O H A Mohamedkhair	9	10
(Cameroon) P N Biya	21	21
(Zimbabwe) R Alfonso	8	11
(Zambia) K Mulenga	21	21
(Mauritius) C Paul	21	21
(Algeria) K Mammeri	14	14

Second Round
(Cameroon) P N Biya	3	6
(Zambia) K Mulenga	21	21
(Mauritius) C Paul	21	16	18
6	(Egypt) A Adbelhakim	14	21	21

Third Round
(Zambia) K Mulenga	21	21
6	(Egypt) A Adbelhakim	6	13

==== Section 6 ====
First Round
(Morocco) Y E Mernissi	21	21
(Ivory Coast) F Ahi	10	12
(Algeria) S Larbaoui	21	21
(Zambia) M Donald	19	9
(Nigeria) E Abah	16	18
(Ghana) M O Baah	21	21

Second Round
(Morocco) Y E Mernissi	9	12
(Algeria) S Larbaoui	21	21
(Ghana) M O Baah	21	20	18
4	(Mauritius) A Lubah	19	22	21

Third Round
(Algeria) S Larbaoui	19	10
4	(Mauritius) A Lubah	21	21

==== Section 7 ====
First Round
(Seychelles) J Renaud	6	8
(Algeria) M A Belarbi	21	21
(Algeria) M Y Balahoune	21	21
(Tunisia) Y Hafouz	2	0
(Morocco) B Elharab	21	15
(Cameroon) M Soudi	4	2^{r}

Second Round
(Algeria) M A Belarbi	21	21
(Algeria) M Y Balahoune	9	11
(Morocco) B Elharab	21	12	19
8	(Nigeria) H T Bello	16	21	21

Third Round
(Algeria) M A Belarbi	24	13	20
8	(Nigeria) H T Bello	22	21	22

==== Section 8 ====
First Round
(Algeria) Y S Medel	21	21
(Seychelles) J Luo	10	17
(Tunisia) Y Vydelingum	6	2
(Zimbabwe) T Mathe	21	21
(Morocco) A E Mernissi	21	21
(Tunisia) Y Hafouz	8	7

Second Round
(Algeria) Y S Medel	21	21
(Zimbabwe) T Mathe	12	11
(Morocco) A E Mernissi	16	9
2	(Egypt) A Salah	21	21

Third Round
(Algeria) Y S Medel	18	21	21
2	(Egypt) A Salah	21	18	16

== Women's singles ==
=== Seeds ===
1. (Mauritius) Kate Foo Kune (champion)
2. (Nigeria) Dorcas Ajoke Adesokan (final)
3. (Egypt) Hadia Hosny (semifinals)
4. (Uganda) Aisha Nakiyemba (quarterfinals)
5. (Egypt) Doha Hany (semifinals)
6. (Algeria) Linda Mazri (third round)
7. (Algeria) Halla Bouksani (quarterfinals)
8. (Nigeria) Zainab Momoh (quarterfinals)

=== Finals ===
Quarterfinals
1	(Mauritius) Kate Foo Kune	21	21
7	(Algeria) Halla Bouksani	10	17
3	(Egypt) Hadia Hosny	21	21
8	(Nigeria) Zainab Momoh	10	17
5	(Egypt) Doha Hany	21	21
4	(Uganda) Aisha Nakiyemba	14	6
(Nigeria) Uchechukwu Deborah Ukeh	11	15
2	(Nigeria) Dorcas Ajoke Adesokan	21	21

Semifinals
1	(Mauritius) Kate Foo Kune	21	18	21
3	(Egypt) Hadia Hosny	13	21	11
5	(Egypt) Doha Hany	14	15
2	(Nigeria) Dorcas Ajoke Adesokan	21	21

Final
1	(Mauritius) Kate Foo Kune	21	21
2	(Nigeria) Dorcas Ajoke Adesokan	16	19

=== Top half ===
==== Section 1 ====
First Round	Second Round				Third Round
	1	(Mauritius) K F Kune	21	21
		(Uganda) D Nakalyango	12	4
					1	(Mauritius) K F Kune	21	21
						(Mauritius) G Mungrah	8	9
	(Cameroon) S J Ngadjui		9	12
	(Mauritius) G Mungrah		21	21

==== Section 2 ====
First Round	Second Round				Third Round
	7	(Algeria) H Bouksani	21	21
		(Uganda) G Mbabazi	6	10
					7	(Algeria) H Bouksani	21	21
						(Zimbabwe) O Matsanura	4	4
	(Ghana) G Mensah		4	12
	(Zimbabwe) O Matsanura		21	21

==== Section 3 ====
First Round	Second Round					Third Round
	3	(Egypt) H Hosny	21	21
		(Ghana) G A Atipaka	7	11
						3	(Egypt) H Hosny	21	21
							(Algeria) D Naama	15	7
	(Algeria) D Naama		21	15	21
	(Uganda) M Namakoye		15	21	16

==== Section 4 ====
First Round
(Algeria) I Ziani	21	21
(Zimbabwe) K T Mudzamiri	6	12

Second Round
8	(Nigeria) Z Momoh	12	21	21
(Ghana) S K Amasah	21	19	12
(Tunisia) S Jebali	4	14
(Algeria) I Ziani	21	21

Third Round
8	(Nigeria) Z Momoh	21	21
(Algeria) I Ziani	8	8

=== Bottom half ===
==== Section 5 ====
First Round
(Egypt) S E E Salem	21	17	21
(Algeria) M Ouchefoun	13	21	14

Second Round
(Egypt) S E E Salem	21	21
(Mauritius) K Dookhee	19	17
(Mauritius) S Mourat	5	10
5	(Egypt) D Hany	21	21

Third Round
(Egypt) S E E Salem	5	1
5	(Egypt) D Hany	21	21

==== Section 6 ====
First Round	Second Round				Third Round
	(Algeria) Y Chibah		21	21
	(Zimbabwe) N Kopolo		6	9
						(Algeria) Y Chibah	21	12	18
					4	(Uganda) A Nakiyemba	17	21	21
		(Algeria) A Kahina	14	9
	4	(Uganda) A Nakiyemba	21	21

==== Section 7 ====
First Round
(Ghana) E Y Migbodzi	21	21
(Cameroon) L L Mbas	10	15

Second Round
(Ghana) E Y Migbodzi	8	4
(Nigeria) U D Ukeh	21	21
(Zimbabwe) A Matsanura	w	/	o
6	(Algeria) L Mazri

Third Round
(Nigeria) U D Ukeh	22	16	21
6	(Algeria) L Mazri	20	21	17

==== Section 8 ====
First Round	Second Round					Third Round
	(Egypt) H T Mohamed		20	21	21
	(Egypt) J Ashraf		22	19	13
							(Egypt) H T Mohamed	20	11
						2	(Nigeria) D A Adesokan	22	21
		(Mauritius) A E E Allet	12	12
	2	(Nigeria) D A Adesokan	21	21

== Men's doubles ==
=== Seeds ===
1. (Mauritius) Aatish Lubah / Georges Paul (second round)
2. (Egypt) Abdelrahman Abdelhakim / Ahmed Salah (semifinals)
3. (Zambia) Chongo Mulenga / Kalombo Mulenga (second round)
4. (Algeria) Mohamed Abderrahime Belarbi / Adel Hamek (champion)

=== Finals ===
Semifinals
(Algeria) Koceila Mammeri (Algeria) Youcef Sabri Medel	21	21
(Mauritius) Jean Bernard Bongout (Mauritius) Christopher Paul	18	19
4	(Algeria) Mohamed Abderrahime Belarbi (Algeria) Adel Hamek	21	21
2	(Egypt) Abdelrahman Abdelhakim (Egypt) Ahmed Salah	16	18

Final
(Algeria) Koceila Mammeri (Algeria) Youcef Sabri Medel	18	22	18
4	(Algeria) Mohamed Abderrahime Belarbi (Algeria) Adel Hamek	21	20	21

=== Top half ===
==== Section 1 ====
First Round
(Nigeria) G Olofua (Nigeria) A J Opeyori	21	21
(Ghana) A Ayittey (Ghana) M O Baah	18	12
(Algeria) K Mammeri (Algeria) Y S Medel	21	21
(Ivory Coast) F Ahi (Ivory Coast) A P Zolobe	7	12

Second Round
1	(Mauritius) A Lubah (Mauritius) G Paul	16	21	19
(Nigeria) G Olofua (Nigeria) A J Opeyori	21	18	21
(Zimbabwe) R Alfonso (Zimbabwe) P Kopolo	9	14
(Algeria) K Mammeri (Algeria) Y S Medel	21	21

Quarterfinals
(Nigeria) G Olofua (Nigeria) A J Opeyori	21	13	16
(Algeria) K Mammeri (Algeria) Y S Medel	17	21	21

==== Section 2 ====
First Round
(Tunisia) Y Hafouz (Tunisia) Y Vydelingum	1	3
(Mauritius) J B Bongout (Mauritius) C Paul	21	21
(Cameroon) P H A Bloch (Cameroon) M Soudi	w	/	o
(Egypt) A H Elgamal (Egypt) S Mamdouh

Second Round
3	(Zambia) C E Mulenga (Zambia) Kalombo Mulenga	17	19
(Mauritius) J B Bongout (Mauritius) C Paul	21	21
(Morocco) A El Mernissi (Morocco) Y El Mernissi	16	8
(Egypt) A H Elgamal (Egypt) S Mamdouh	21	21

Quarterfinals
(Mauritius) J B Bongout (Mauritius) C Paul	21	21
(Egypt) A H Elgamal (Egypt) S Mamdouh	18	13

=== Bottom half ===
==== Section 3 ====
First Round
(Seychelles) J Luo (Seychelles) J Renaud	19	16
(Algeria) M Y Balahoune (Algeria) M A Guelmaoui	21	21
(Ghana) D Sam (Ghana) E Donkor	21	21
(Zambia) M Banda (Zambia) M Donald	16	8
(Nigeria) H T Bello (Nigeria) A I Usman	21	21	25
(Mauritius) M Appiah (Mauritius) T Pultoo	18	23	27

Second Round
(Algeria) M Y Balahoune (Algeria) M A Guelmaoui	14	12
(Ghana) D Sam (Ghana) E Donkor	21	21
(Mauritius) M Appiah (Mauritius) T Pultoo	21	12	10
4	(Algeria) M A Belarbi (Algeria) A Hamek	16	21	21

Quarterfinals
(Ghana) D Sam (Ghana) E Donkor	15	16
4	(Algeria) M A Belarbi (Algeria) A Hamek	21	21

==== Section 4 ====
First Round
(Algeria) S Larbaoui (Algeria) M A Ouchefoun	12	17
(Morocco) B Elharab (Morocco) A A Ksikes	21	21
(Ivory Coast) A J I Agnimel (Ivory Coast) O Ouedraogo	21	17	17
(Zimbabwe) A Dziva (Zimbabwe) T Mathe	18	21	21

Second Round
(Morocco) B Elharab (Morocco) A A Ksikes	21	21
(Cameroon) P N Biya (Cameroon) A E O Ndimako	17	12
(Zimbabwe) A Dziva (Zimbabwe) T Mathe	12	11
2	(Egypt) A Abdelhakim (Egypt) A Salah	21	21

Quarterfinals
(Morocco) B Elharab (Morocco) A A Ksikes	12	7
2	(Egypt) A Abdelhakim (Egypt) A Salah	21	21

== Women's doubles ==
=== Seeds ===
1. (Egypt) Doha Hany / Hadia Hosny (final)
2. (Algeria) Halla Bouksani / Linda Mazri (semifinals)
3. (Mauritius) Aurelie Marie Elisa Allet / Kobita Dookhee (quarterfinals)
4. (Nigeria) Zainab Momoh / Peace Orji (semifinals)

=== Finals ===
Semifinals
1	(Egypt) Doha Hany (Egypt) Hadia Hosny	21	21
4	(Nigeria) Zainab Momoh (Nigeria) Peace Orji	11	11
(Seychelles) Juliette Ah-Wan (Seychelles) Allisen Camille	21	21
2	(Algeria) Halla Bouksani (Algeria) Linda Mazri	16	19

Final
1	(Egypt) Doha Hany (Egypt) Hadia Hosny	18	21	18
(Seychelles) Juliette Ah-Wan (Seychelles) Allisen Camille	21	13	21

=== Top half ===
==== Section 1 ====
First Round	Second Round				Quarterfinals
	1	(Egypt) D Hany (Egypt) H Hosny	21	21
		(Mauritius) S Mourat (Mauritius) Ganesha Mungrah	13	14
					1	(Egypt) D Hany (Egypt) H Hosny	21	21
						(Ghana) S K Amasah (Ghana) E Y Migbodzi	9	14
	(Ghana) S K Amasah (Ghana) E Y Migbodzi		22	21
	(Algeria) I Chekkal (Algeria) Y Chibah		20	14

==== Section 2 ====
First Round	Second Round					Quarterfinals
	4	(Nigeria) Z Momoh (Nigeria) P Orji	w	/	o
		(Zimbabwe) A Matsanura (Zimbabwe) O Matsanura
						4	(Nigeria) Z Momoh (Nigeria) P Orji	21	21
							(Uganda) G Mbabazi (Uganda) A Nakiyemba	15	9
	(Algeria) D Naama (Algeria) M Ouchefoun		21	14
	(Uganda) G Mbabazi (Uganda) A Nakiyemba		23	21

=== Bottom half ===
==== Section 3 ====
First Round
(Seychelles) J Ah-Wan (Seychelles) A Camille	21	21
(Uganda) D Nakalyango (Uganda) M Namakoye	11	7

Second Round
(Seychelles) J Ah-Wan (Seychelles) A Camille	21	21
(Egypt) S E E Salem (Egypt) H T Mohamed	8	14
(Ghana) G A Atipaka (Ghana) G Mensah	8	9
3	(Mauritius) A M E Allet (Mauritius) K Dookhee	21	21

Quarterfinals
(Seychelles) J Ah-Wan (Seychelles) A Camille	21	21
3	(Mauritius) A M E Allet (Mauritius) K Dookhee	19	15

==== Section 4 ====
First Round	Second Round				Quarterfinals
	(Cameroon) L L Mbas (Cameroon) S J Ngadjul		11	10
	(Algeria) F Houde (Algeria) A Kahina		21	21
						(Algeria) F Houde (Algeria) A Kahina	5	5
					2	(Algeria) H Bouksani (Algeria) L Mazri	21	21
		(Zimbabwe) N Kopolo (Zimbabwe) K T Mudzamiri	9	7
	2	(Algeria) H Bouksani (Algeria) L Mazri	21	21

== Mixed doubles ==
=== Seeds ===
1. (Ghana) Emmanuel Donkor / Stella Amasah (second round)
2. (Nigeria) Enejoh Abah / Peace Orji (final)
3. (Egypt) Adham Hatem Elgamal / Doha Hany (semifinals)
4. (Algeria) Koceila Mammeri / Linda Mazri (champion)

=== Finals ===
Semifinals
(Egypt) Ahemd Salah (Egypt) Hadia Hosny	21	17	15
4	(Algeria) Koceila Mammeri (Algeria) Linda Mazri	19	21	21
3	(Egypt) Adham Hatem Elgamal (Egypt) Doha Hany	19	21
2	(Nigeria) Enejoh Abah (Nigeria) Peace Orji	21	23

Final
4	(Algeria) Koceila Mammeri (Algeria) Linda Mazri	21	15	21
2	(Nigeria) Enejoh Abah (Nigeria) Peace Orji	17	21	12

=== Top half ===
==== Section 1 ====
First Round
(Nigeria) C Krobakpo (Nigeria) D A Adesokan	21	21
(Algeria) M A Ouchefoun (Algeria) M Ouchefoun	14	8
(Zimbabwe) A Dziva (Zimbabwe) N Kopolo	6	7
(Mauritius) G Paul (Mauritius) A E E Allet	21	21

Second Round
1	(Ghana) E Donkor (Ghana) S K Amasah	14	16
(Nigeria) C Krobakpo (Nigeria) D A Adesokan	21	21
(Egypt) A Salah (Egypt) H Hosny	21	21
(Mauritius) G Paul (Mauritius) A E E Allet	19	19

Quarterfinals
(Nigeria) C Krobakpo (Nigeria) D A Adesokan	15	15
(Egypt) A Salah (Egypt) H Hosny	21	21

==== Section 2 ====
First Round
(Cameroon) P N Biya (Cameroon) S J Ngadjui	17	14
(Egypt) S Mamdouh (Egypt) H T Mohamed	21	21
(Zimbabwe) R Alfonso (Zimbabwe) A Matsanura	13	8
(Egypt) A Abdelhakim (Egypt) S E E Salem	21	21
(Algeria) S Khaldi (Algeria) H Bouksani	21	21
(Zimbabwe) P Kopolo (Zimbabwe) O Matsanura	12	9

Second Round
4	(Algeria) K Mammeri (Algeria) L Mazri	21	21
(Egypt) S Mamdouh (Egypt) H T Mohamed	15	15
(Egypt) A Abdelhakim (Egypt) S E E Salem	13	21	19
(Algeria) S Khaldi (Algeria) H Bouksani	21	18	21

Quarterfinals
4	(Algeria) K Mammeri (Algeria) L Mazri	21	21
(Algeria) S Khaldi (Algeria) H Bouksani	10	16

=== Bottom half ===
==== Section 3 ====
First Round
(Mauritius) J B Bongout (Mauritius) G Mungrah	17	11
(Ghana) D Sam (Ghana) G Mensah	21	21
(Cameroon) A E O Ndimako (Cameroon) L L Mbas	21	18	21
(Zimbabwe) T Mathe (Zimbabwe) K T Mudzamiri	16	21	12
(Ghana) M O Baah (Ghana) G A Atipaka	21	20	10
(Algeria) M Y Balahoune (Algeria) I Chekkal	19	22	21

Second Round
(Ghana) D Sam (Ghana) G Mensah	21	21
(Cameroon) A E O Ndimako (Cameroon) L L Mbas	15	9
(Algeria) M Y Balahoune (Algeria) I Chekkal	11	10
3	(Egypt) A H Elgamal (Egypt) D Hany	21	21

Quarterfinals
(Ghana) D Sam (Ghana) G Mensah	19	21	15
3	(Egypt) A H Elgamal (Egypt) D Hany	21	19	21

==== Section 4 ====
First Round
(Algeria) M A Guelmaoui (Algeria) F Houda	15	10
(Mauritius) A Lubah (Mauritius) K Dookhee	21	21
(Ghana) A Ayittey (Ghana) E Y Migbodzi	14	19
(Morocco) B Elharab (Morocco) R Rochdy	21	21
(Mauritius) T Pultoo (Mauritius) S Mourat	21	21
(Tunisia) Y Hafouz (Tunisia) S Jebali	6	6

Second Round
(Mauritius) A Lubah (Mauritius) K Dookhee	10	21	19
(Morocco) B Elharab (Morocco) R Rochdy	21	16	21
(Mauritius) T Pultoo (Mauritius) S Mourat	11	9
2	(Nigeria) E Abah (Nigeria) P Orji	21	21

Quarterfinals
(Morocco) B Elharab (Morocco) R Rochdy	21	9	8
2	(Nigeria) E Abah (Nigeria) P Orji	15	21	21
