= Koceila Mammeri =

Algerian badminton player (born 1999)

Koceila Mammeri كسيلة معمري
Personal information
- Born: Koceila Julien Mammeri; 23 February 1999 (age 27) Chambéry, France
- Height: 1.99 m (6 ft 6 in)

Sport
- Country: Algeria
- Sport: Badminton
- Handedness: Right
- Coached by: Florent Riancho; Djitli Halim

Men's & mixed doubles
- Highest ranking: 55 (MD with Youcef Sabri Medel, 8 November 2022); 41 (XD with Tanina Mammeri, 29 October 2024)
- Current ranking: 127 (MD with Youcef Sabri Medel); 77 (XD with Tanina Mammeri) (16 June 2026)
- BWF profile
Medal record
Men's badminton
Representing Algeria
African Games
Gold medal – first place	2019 Rabat	Mixed doubles
Gold medal – first place	2023 Accra	Men's doubles
Gold medal – first place	2023 Accra	Mixed doubles
Silver medal – second place	2019 Rabat	Mixed team
African Championships
Gold medal – first place	2017 Benoni	Men's doubles
Gold medal – first place	2018 Algiers	Mixed doubles
Gold medal – first place	2019 Port Harcourt	Men's doubles
Gold medal – first place	2019 Port Harcourt	Mixed doubles
Gold medal – first place	2020 Cairo	Men's doubles
Gold medal – first place	2021 Kampala	Men's doubles
Gold medal – first place	2021 Kampala	Mixed doubles
Gold medal – first place	2022 Kampala	Men's doubles
Gold medal – first place	2022 Kampala	Mixed doubles
Gold medal – first place	2023 Benoni	Mixed doubles
Gold medal – first place	2024 Cairo	Men's doubles
Gold medal – first place	2024 Cairo	Mixed doubles
Gold medal – first place	2025 Douala	Men's doubles
Gold medal – first place	2025 Douala	Mixed doubles
Gold medal – first place	2026 Gaborone	Men's doubles
Gold medal – first place	2026 Gaborone	Mixed doubles
Silver medal – second place	2018 Algiers	Men's doubles
Silver medal – second place	2020 Cairo	Mixed doubles
Bronze medal – third place	2023 Benoni	Men's doubles
Africa Mixed Team Championships
Gold medal – first place	2025 Douala	Mixed team
Silver medal – second place	2021 Kampala	Mixed team
Bronze medal – third place	2023 Benoni	Mixed team
Africa Men's Team Championships
Gold medal – first place	2018 Algiers	Men's team
Gold medal – first place	2020 Cairo	Men's team
Gold medal – first place	2022 Kampala	Men's team
Gold medal – first place	2024 Cairo	Men's team
Gold medal – first place	2026 Gaborone	Men's team
Bronze medal – third place	2016 Rose Hill	Men's team
Mediterranean Games
Gold medal – first place	2022 Oran	Men's doubles
Silver medal – second place	2026 Taranto	Men's doubles
Bronze medal – third place	2026 Taranto	Mixed doubles
Arab Games
Gold medal – first place	2023 Algiers	Men's doubles
Gold medal – first place	2023 Algiers	Mixed doubles

Koceila Julien Mammeri (Arabic: كسيلة جوليان معمري; born 23 February 1999) is a badminton player who trained at the Oullins club in France. Born in France, he represents Algeria internationally. In the junior event, he was the third place at the Portugal International tournament in the boys' doubles event. He won gold medals at the 2017, 2019, 2020, 2021 and 2022 African Championships for men's doubles with his partner Youcef Sabri Medel, and in 2018 and 2019 for mixed doubles with Linda Mazri, and also in 2021 and 2022 for mixed doubles with Tanina Mammeri. He claimed the mixed doubles gold medals at the 2019 African Games with Mazri and in 2023 with Tanina Mammeri.

Partnered with her sister Tanina Mammeri, the duo competed at the 2024 Summer Olympics.

== Achievements ==
=== African Games ===
Men's doubles
Year	Venue	Partner	Opponent	Score	Result
2023	Borteyman Sports Complex; Accra, Ghana	(Algeria) Youcef Sabri Medel	(Nigeria) Godwin Olofua (Nigeria) Anuoluwapo Juwon Opeyori	21–6, 21–15	Gold

Mixed doubles
Year	Venue	Partner	Opponent	Score	Result
2019	Ain Chock Indoor Sports Center; Casablanca, Morocco	(Algeria) Linda Mazri	(Egypt) Adham Hatem Elgamal (Egypt) Doha Hany	21–19, 21–16	Gold
2023	Borteyman Sports Complex; Accra, Ghana	(Algeria) Tanina Mammeri	(Egypt) Adham Hatem Elgamal (Egypt) Doha Hany	21–11, 21–15	Gold

=== African Championships ===
Men's doubles
Year	Venue	Partner	Opponent	Score	Result
2017	John Barrable Hall, Benoni, South Africa	(Algeria) Youcef Sabri Medel	(South Africa) Andries Malan (South Africa) James Hilton Mcmanus	13–21, 21–19, 21–9	Gold
2018	Salle OMS Harcha Hacéne, Algiers, Algeria	(Algeria) Youcef Sabri Medel	(Algeria) Mohamed Abderrahime Belarbi (Algeria) Adel Hamek	18–21, 22–20, 18–21	Silver
2019	Alfred Diete-Spiff Centre, Port Harcourt, Nigeria	(Algeria) Youcef Sabri Medel	(Nigeria) Enejoh Abah (Nigeria) Isaac Minaphee	21–18, 21–17	Gold
2020	Cairo Stadium Hall 2, Cairo, Egypt	(Algeria) Youcef Sabri Medel	(Mauritius) Aatish Lubah (Mauritius) Julien Paul	19–21, 21–14, 24–22	Gold
2021	MTN Arena, Kampala, Uganda	(Algeria) Youcef Sabri Medel	(Egypt) Abdelrahman Abdelhakim (Egypt) Ahmed Salah	21–16, 21–13	Gold
2022	Lugogo Arena, Kampala, Uganda	(Algeria) Youcef Sabri Medel	(Egypt) Adham Hatem Elgamal (Egypt) Ahmed Salah	21–23, 21–19, 21–18	Gold
2023	John Barrable Hall, Benoni, South Africa	(Algeria) Youcef Sabri Medel	(South Africa) Jarred Elliott (South Africa) Robert Summers	21–12, 18–21, 19–21	Bronze
2024	Cairo Stadium Indoor Halls Complex, Cairo, Egypt	(Algeria) Youcef Sabri Medel	(Nigeria) Nusa Momoh (Nigeria) Godwin Olofua	21–12, 21–8	Gold
2025	Gymnase de Japoma, Douala, Cameroon	(Algeria) Youcef Sabri Medel	(Mauritius) Jean Bernard Bongout (Mauritius) Julien Paul	21–19, 21–9	Gold
2026	Royal Aria, Gaborone, Botswana	(Algeria) Youcef Sabri Medel	(Zambia) Chongo Mulenga (Zambia) Kalombo Mulenga	21–16, 21–19	Gold

Mixed doubles
Year	Venue	Partner	Opponent	Score	Result
2018	Salle OMS Harcha Hacéne, Algiers, Algeria	(Algeria) Linda Mazri	(Nigeria) Enejoh Abah (Nigeria) Peace Orji	21–17, 15–21, 21–12	Gold
2019	Alfred Diete-Spiff Centre, Port Harcourt, Nigeria	(Algeria) Linda Mazri	(Nigeria) Enejoh Abah (Nigeria) Peace Orji	15–21, 21–16, 21–18	Gold
2020	Cairo Stadium Hall 2, Cairo, Egypt	(Algeria) Linda Mazri	(Egypt) Adham Hatem Elgamal (Egypt) Doha Hany	13–21, 21–18, 19–21	Silver
2021	MTN Arena, Kampala, Uganda	(Algeria) Tanina Mammeri	(Egypt) Adham Hatem Elgamal (Egypt) Doha Hany	21–10, 21–7	Gold
2022	Lugogo Arena, Kampala, Uganda	(Algeria) Tanina Mammeri	(South Africa) Jarred Elliott (South Africa) Amy Ackerman	21–13, 21–14	Gold
2023	John Barrable Hall, Benoni, South Africa	(Algeria) Tanina Mammeri	(Egypt) Adham Hatem Elgamal (Egypt) Doha Hany	21–15, 21–13	Gold
2024	Cairo Stadium Indoor Halls Complex, Cairo, Egypt	(Algeria) Tanina Mammeri	(Egypt) Adham Hatem Elgamal (Egypt) Doha Hany	21–23, 21–16, 21–11	Gold
2025	Gymnase de Japoma, Douala, Cameroon	(Algeria) Tanina Mammeri	(Egypt) Adham Hatem Elgamal (Egypt) Doha Hany	Walkover	Gold
2026	Royal Aria, Gaborone, Botswana	(Algeria) Tanina Mammeri	(South Africa) Caden Kakora (South Africa) Amy Ackerman	21–12, 21–9	Gold

=== Mediterranean Games ===
Men's doubles
Year	Venue	Partner	Opponent	Score	Result	Ref.
2022	Multipurpose Omnisports Hall; Oued Tlélat, Algeria	(Algeria) Youcef Sabri Medel	(Spain) Pablo Abián (Spain) Luis Enrique Peñalver	14–21, 21–19, 21–16	Gold	
2026	Francavilla Sport Hall; Taranto, Italy	(Algeria) Youcef Sabri Medel	(Turkey) Emre SONMEZ (Turkey) Bugra AKTAS	19–21, 19–21,	Silver	

Mixed doubles
Year	Venue	Partner	Opponent	Score	Result	Ref.
2026	Palazzetto dello Sport; Francavilla Fontana, Italy	(Algeria) Tanina Mammeri	(France) Natan Begga (France) Elsa Jacob	21–23, 17–21	Bronze	

=== BWF International Challenge/Series (24 titles, 10 runners-up) ===
Men's doubles
Year	Tournament	Partner	Opponent	Score	Result
2019	Kenya International	(Algeria) Youcef Sabri Medel	(Mauritius) Aatish Lubah (Mauritius) Julien Paul	14–21, 22–20, 21–18	(gold) Winner
2019	Egypt International	(Algeria) Youcef Sabri Medel	(Poland) Paweł Pietryja (Poland) Jan Rudziński	21–19, 24–22	(gold) Winner
2019	Algeria International	(Algeria) Youcef Sabri Medel	(Poland) Paweł Pietryja (Poland) Jan Rudziński	21–16, 21–16	(gold) Winner
2019	Zambia International	(Algeria) Youcef Sabri Medel	(Egypt) Adham Hatem Elgamal (Egypt) Ahmed Salah	22–20, 19–21, 14–21	(silver) Runner-up
2019	South Africa International	(Algeria) Youcef Sabri Medel	(Egypt) Adham Hatem Elgamal (Egypt) Ahmed Salah	21–17, 21–17	(gold) Winner
2021	Peru International	(Algeria) Youcef Sabri Medel	(Guatemala) Aníbal Marroquín (Guatemala) Jonathan Solís	21–18, 21–15	(gold) Winner
2023	Brazil International	(Algeria) Youcef Sabri Medel	(Brazil) Fabrício Farias (Brazil) Davi Silva	21–16, 21–18	(gold) Winner
2023	Cameroon International	(Algeria) Youcef Sabri Medel	(India) P.S Ravikrishna (India) Sankar Prasad Udayakumar	12–21, 19–21	(silver) Runner-up
2023	Lagos International	(Algeria) Youcef Sabri Medel	(India) P.S Ravikrishna (India) Sankar Prasad Udayakumar	15–21, 14–21	(silver) Runner-up
2023	Algeria International	(Algeria) Youcef Sabri Medel	(Algeria) Mohamed Abderrahime Belarbi (Algeria) Adel Hamek	21–13, 27–25	(gold) Winner
2023	Guatemala International	(Algeria) Youcef Sabri Medel	(Mexico) Job Castillo (Mexico) Luis Montoya	18–21, 17–21	(silver) Runner-up
2023	Zambia International	(Algeria) Youcef Sabri Medel	(Malaysia) Keane Chok (Malaysia) Andy Kok	21–11, 15–21, 21–13	(gold) Winner
2024	Egypt International	(Algeria) Youcef Sabri Medel	(Thailand) Kittisak Namdash (Thailand) Samatcha Tovannakasem	21–13, 18–21, 13–21	(silver) Runner-up
2024	Algeria International	(Algeria) Youcef Sabri Medel	(India) Nithin H. V. (India) Venkata Harsha Veeramreddy	11–21, 21–9, 23–21	(gold) Winner
2025	Algeria International	(Algeria) Youcef Sabri Medel	(Belgium) Iljo van Delsen (Belgium) Yaro van Delsen	21–19, 21–18	(gold) Winner
2025	Egypt International	(Algeria) Youcef Sabri Medel	(Malaysia) Ashraf Zakaria (Malaysia) Ariffin Zakaria	21–5, 21–14	(gold) Winner

Mixed doubles
Year	Tournament	Partner	Opponent	Score	Result
2022	Uganda International	(Algeria) Tanina Mammeri	(India) Senthil Vel Govindarasu (Malaysia) Venosha Radhakrishnan	19–21, 21–18, 22–20	(gold) Winner
2022	Maldives International	(Algeria) Tanina Mammeri	(India) Rohan Kapoor (India) N. Sikki Reddy	16–21, 18–21	(silver) Runner-up
2023	Santo Domingo Open	(Algeria) Tanina Mammeri	(Mexico) Luis Montoya (Mexico) Miriam Rodríguez	21–13, 21–19	(gold) Winner
2023	Mauritius International	(Algeria) Tanina Mammeri	(India) Hariharan Amsakarunan (India) Varshini Viswanath Sri	16–21, 17–21	(silver) Runner-up
2023	Réunion Open	(Algeria) Tanina Mammeri	(India) Hariharan Amsakarunan (India) Varshini Viswanath Sri	21–19, 21–14	(gold) Winner
2023	Brazil International	(Algeria) Tanina Mammeri	(Brazil) Davi Silva (Brazil) Sania Lima	12–21, 15–21	(silver) Runner-up
2023	Cameroon International	(Algeria) Tanina Mammeri	(Slovenia) Miha Ivančič (Slovenia) Petra Polanc	21–17, 21–17	(gold) Winner
2023	Uganda International	(Algeria) Tanina Mammeri	(South Africa) Caden Kakora (South Africa) Johanita Scholtz	21–17, 21–18	(gold) Winner
2023	Egypt International	(Algeria) Tanina Mammeri	(Germany) Jones Ralfy Jansen (Germany) Julia Meyer	19–21, 18–21	(silver) Runner-up
2023	Algeria International	(Algeria) Tanina Mammeri	(Switzerland) Hugo Chanthakesone (Switzerland) Leila Zarrouk	21–12, 21–6	(gold) Winner
2023	Guatemala International	(Algeria) Tanina Mammeri	(Mexico) Luis Montoya (Mexico) Miriam Rodríguez	21–17, 16–21, 21–19	(gold) Winner
2023	Zambia International	(Algeria) Tanina Mammeri	(Mauritius) Melvin Appiah (Mauritius) Vilina Appiah	21–5, 21–13	(gold) Winner
2024	Egypt International	(Algeria) Tanina Mammeri	(India) Bokka Navaneeth (India) Ritika Thaker	23–21, 21–17	(gold) Winner
2024	Algeria International	(Algeria) Tanina Mammeri	(Portugal) Bruno Carvalho (Portugal) Mariana Paiva	21–17, 21–11	(gold) Winner
2025	Algeria International	(Algeria) Tanina Mammeri	(Switzerland) Nicolas Franconville (Switzerland) Julie Franconville	21–15, 21–12	(gold) Winner
2025	Egypt International	(Algeria) Tanina Mammeri	(France) Aymeric Tores (Netherlands) Kirsten de Wit	21–16, 21–18	(gold) Winner
2026	Cameroon International	(Algeria) Tanina Mammeri	(India) Dhruv Rawat (India) K. Maneesha	21–23, 17–21	(silver) Runner-up
2026	Peru International	(Algeria) Tanina Mammeri	(Canada) Jonathan Lai (Canada) Crystal Lai	21–18, 18–21, 21–15	(gold) Winner

BWF International Challenge tournament
BWF International Series tournament
BWF Future Series tournament
