= Clement Krobakpo =

Nigerian badminton player (born 1994)

Personal information
- Born: Clement Ebiowo Krobakpo; 1 July 1994 (age 32)
- Height: 1.75 m (5 ft 9 in)
- Weight: 57 kg (126 lb)

Sport
- Country: Nigeria
- Sport: Badminton

Men's singles & doubles
- Highest ranking: 150 (MS 28 June 2018); 277 (MD 18 September 2014); 148 (XD 28 June 2018)
- BWF profile
Medal record
Men's badminton
Representing Nigeria
African Games
Gold medal – first place	2019 Rabat	Mixed team
Bronze medal – third place	2015 Brazzaville	Men's singles
Bronze medal – third place	2015 Brazzaville	Mixed team
African Championships
Gold medal – first place	2019 Port Harcourt	Mixed team
Bronze medal – third place	2019 Port Harcourt	Men's singles
Bronze medal – third place	2017 Benoni	Mixed team
Bronze medal – third place	2018 Algiers	Men's singles
Africa Team Championships
Silver medal – second place	2018 Algiers	Men's team

Clement Ebiowo Krobakpo (born 1 July 1994) is a Nigerian badminton player. He won two bronze medals at the 2015 African Games in the men's singles and team events. Krobakpo also competed at the 2019 African Games, winning the mixed team gold.

== Achievements ==
=== All-African Games ===
Men's singles
Year	Venue	Opponent	Score	Result
2015	Gymnase Étienne Mongha; Brazzaville, Republic of the Congo	(South Africa) Jacob Maliekal	18–21, 14–21	Bronze

=== African Championships ===
Men's singles
Year	Venue	Opponent	Score	Result
2018	Salle OMS Harcha Hacéne; Algiers, Algeria	(Mauritius) Georges Paul	13–21, 13–21	Bronze
2019	Alfred Diete-Spiff Centre; Port Harcourt, Nigeria	(Nigeria) Anuoluwapo Juwon Opeyori	10–21, 8–21	Bronze

=== BWF International Challenge/Series (1 title) ===
Mixed doubles
Year	Tournament	Partner	Opponent	Score	Result
2018	Côte d'Ivoire International	(Nigeria) Dorcas Ajoke Adesokan	(Zambia) Kalombo Mulenga (Zambia) Ogar Siamupangila	21–9, 21–15	(gold) Winner

BWF International Challenge tournament
BWF International Series tournament
BWF Future Series tournament
