= Ahmed Salah (badminton) =

Egyptian badminton player (born 1990)

Personal information
- Born: Ahmed Salah El Din; 30 September 1990 (age 36) Cairo, Egypt
- Height: 1.75 m (5 ft 9 in)

Sport
- Country: Egypt
- Sport: Badminton
- Handedness: Right

Men's singles & doubles
- Highest ranking: 115 (MS 19 October 2017); 68 (MD 18 February 2020); 56 (XD 14 September 2017)
- BWF profile
Medal record
Men's badminton
Representing Egypt
African Games
Bronze medal – third place	2019 Rabat	Men's doubles
Bronze medal – third place	2019 Rabat	Mixed team
Bronze medal – third place	2023 Accra	Men's doubles
African Championships
Gold medal – first place	2017 Benoni	Mixed team
Gold medal – first place	2021 Kampala	Mixed team
Gold medal – first place	2023 Benoni	Mixed team
Silver medal – second place	2017 Benoni	Men's singles
Silver medal – second place	2021 Kampala]	Men's singles
Silver medal – second place	2021 Kampala	Men's doubles
Silver medal – second place	2022 Kampala	Men's doubles
Bronze medal – third place	2011 Marrakesh	Mixed team
Bronze medal – third place	2017 Benoni	Mixed doubles
Bronze medal – third place	2018 Algiers	Men's doubles
Bronze medal – third place	2018 Algiers	Mixed doubles
Bronze medal – third place	2019 Port Harcourt	Men's doubles
Bronze medal – third place	2019 Port Harcourt	Mixed doubles
Bronze medal – third place	2019 Port Harcourt	Mixed team
Bronze medal – third place	2020 Cairo	Mixed doubles
Africa Men's Team Championships
Silver medal – second place	2022 Kampala	Men's team
Bronze medal – third place	2008 Rose Hill	Men's team
Bronze medal – third place	2010 Kampala	Men's team
Bronze medal – third place	2020 Cairo	Men's team

Ahmed Salah El Din (born 30 September 1990) is an Egyptian former badminton player. He started playing badminton since 1999, and was selected to join the national team in 2005.

In May 2024, Salah announced his retirement from international badminton.

== Achievements ==
=== African Games ===
Men's doubles
Year	Venue	Partner	Opponent	Score	Result
2019	Ain Chock Indoor Sports Center; Casablanca, Morocco	(Egypt) Adham Hatem Elgamal	(Mauritius) Aatish Lubah (Mauritius) Julien Paul	14–21, 21–14, 18–21	Bronze
2023	Borteyman Sports Complex; Accra, Ghana	(Egypt) Adham Hatem Elgamal	(Algeria) Koceila Mammeri (Algeria) Youcef Sabri Medel	14–21, 19–21	Bronze

=== African Championships ===
Men's singles
Year	Venue	Opponent	Score	Result
2017	John Barrable Hall, Benoni, South Africa	(Algeria) Adel Hamek	19–21, 13–21	Silver
2021	MTN Arena, Kampala, Uganda	(Egypt) Adham Hatem Elgamal	14–21, 14–21	Silver

Men's doubles
Year	Venue	Partner	Opponent	Score	Result
2018	Salle OMS Harcha Hacéne; Algiers, Algeria	(Egypt) Abdelrahman Abdelhakim	(Algeria) Adel Hamek (Algeria) Mohamed Abderrahime Belarbi	16–21, 18–21	Bronze
2019	Alfred Diete-Spiff Centre; Port Harcourt, Nigeria	(Egypt) Abdelrahman Abdelhakim	(Nigeria) Enejoh Abah (Nigeria) Isaac Minaphee	13–21, 10–21	Bronze
2021	MTN Arena; Kampala, Uganda	(Egypt) Abdelrahman Abdelhakim	(Algeria) Koceila Mammeri (Algeria) Youcef Sabri Medel	16–21, 13–21	Silver
2022	Lugogo Arena; Kampala, Uganda	(Egypt) Adham Hatem Elgamal	(Algeria) Koceila Mammeri (Algeria) Youcef Sabri Medel	23–21, 19–21, 18–21	Silver

Mixed doubles
Year	Venue	Partner	Opponent	Score	Result
2017	John Barrable Hall; Benoni, South Africa	(Egypt) Menna El-Tanany	(Mauritius) Julien Paul (Mauritius) Kate Foo Kune	19–21, 15–21	Bronze
2018	Salle OMS Harcha Hacéne; Algiers, Algeria	(Egypt) Hadia Hosny	(Algeria) Koceila Mammeri (Algeria) Linda Mazri	21–19, 17–21, 15–21	Bronze
2019	Alfred Diete-Spiff Centre; Port Harcourt, Nigeria	(Egypt) Hadia Hosny	(Algeria) Koceila Mammeri (Algeria) Linda Mazri	23–21,17–21, 13–21	Bronze
2020	Cairo Stadium Hall 2 Cairo, Egypt	(Egypt) Hadia Hosny	(Algeria) Koceila Mammeri (Algeria) Linda Mazri	21–17, 16–21, 8–21	Bronze

=== BWF International Challenge/Series (8 titles, 12 runners-up) ===
Men's doubles
Year	Tournament	Partner	Opponent	Score	Result
2016	Zambia International	(Egypt) Abdelrahman Abdelhakim	(Mauritius) Aatish Lubah (Mauritius) Julien Paul	21–15, 16–21, 18–21	(silver) Runner-up
2016	South Africa International	(Egypt) Abdelrahman Abdelhakim	(South Africa) Matthew Michel (South Africa) Prakash Vijayanath	21–16, 22–20	(gold) Winner
2019	Uganda International	(India) Siddhartha	(Nigeria) Godwin Olofua (Nigeria) Anuoluwapo Juwon Opeyori	18–21, 11–21	(silver) Runner-up
2019	Mauritius International	(Egypt) Adham Hatem Elgamal	(Malaysia) Boon Xin Yuan (Malaysia) Yap Qar Siong	16–21, 18–21	(silver) Runner-up
2019	Côte d'Ivoire International	(Egypt) Adham Hatem Elgamal	(Nigeria) Godwin Olofua (Nigeria) Anuoluwapo Juwon Opeyori	22–20, 21–19	(gold) Winner
2019	Cameroon International	(Egypt) Adham Hatem Elgamal	(Nigeria) Godwin Olofua (Nigeria) Anuoluwapo Juwon Opeyori	12–21, 21–11, 11–21	(silver) Runner-up
2019	Zambia International	(Egypt) Adham Hatem Elgamal	(Algeria) Koceila Mammeri (Algeria) Youcef Sabri Medel	20–22, 21–19, 21–14	(gold) Winner
2019	South Africa International	(Egypt) Adham Hatem Elgamal	(Algeria) Koceila Mammeri (Algeria) Youcef Sabri Medel	17–21, 17–21	(silver) Runner-up

Mixed doubles
Year	Tournament	Partner	Opponent	Score	Result
2015	Ethiopia International	(Egypt) Menna El-Tanany	(Egypt) Ali Ahmed El-Khateeb (Egypt) Doha Hany	21–15, 21–16	(gold) Winner
2015	Egypt International	(Egypt) Menna El-Tanany	(Egypt) Abdelrahman Kashkal (Egypt) Hadia Hosny	21–18, 21–15	(gold) Winner
2016	Ethiopia International	(Egypt) Menna El-Tanany	(Zambia) Topsy Phiri (Zambia) Elizaberth Chipeleme	21–15, 21–9	(gold) Winner
2016	Egypt International	(Egypt) Menna El-Tanany	(Belarus) Uladzimir Varantsou (Belarus) Kristina Silich	21–14, 21–10	(gold) Winner
2016	Zambia International	(Egypt) Menna El-Tanany	(Zambia) Juma Muwowo (Zambia) Ogar Siamupangila	21–7, 15–21, 21–18	(gold) Winner
2017	Uganda International	(Egypt) Menna El-Tanany	(Jordan) Bahaedeen Ahmad Alshannik (Jordan) Domou Amro	21–16, 12–21, 19–21	(silver) Runner-up
2017	Egypt International	(Egypt) Menna El-Tanany	(Malaysia) Yogendran Khrishnan (India) Prajakta Sawant	15–21, 13–21	(silver) Runner-up
2018	Cameroon International	(Egypt) Hadia Hosny	(Egypt) Adham Hatem Elgamal (Egypt) Doha Hany	21–13, 15–21, 15–21	(silver) Runner-up
2019	Kenya International	(Egypt) Hadia Hosny	(Jordan) Bahaedeen Ahmad Alshannik (Jordan) Domou Amro	21–11, 10–21, 15–21	(silver) Runner-up
2019	Côte d'Ivoire International	(Egypt) Hadia Hosny	(United States) Howard Shu (United States) Paula Lynn Obañana	16–21, 14–21	(silver) Runner-up
2019	Cameroon International	(Egypt) Hadia Hosny	(Egypt) Adham Hatem Elgamal (Egypt) Doha Hany	Walkover	(silver) Runner-up
2019	Zambia International	(Egypt) Hadia Hosny	(Egypt) Adham Hatem Elgamal (Egypt) Doha Hany	17–21, 17–21	(silver) Runner-up

BWF International Challenge tournament
BWF International Series tournament
BWF Future Series tournament
