= Peace Orji =

Nigerian badminton player

Personal information
- Born: 20 December 1995 (age 30)
- Height: 1.75 m (5 ft 9 in)
- Weight: 65 kg (143 lb)

Sport
- Country: Nigeria
- Sport: Badminton

Women's & mixed doubles
- Highest ranking: 172 (WD 29 March 2018); 83 (XD 12 November 2019)
- BWF profile
Medal record
Women's badminton
Representing Nigeria
African Games
Gold medal – first place	2019 Rabat	Mixed team
Bronze medal – third place	2019 Rabat	Mixed doubles
African Championships
Silver medal – second place	2018 Algiers	Mixed doubles
Silver medal – second place	2019 Port Harcourt	Mixed doubles
Bronze medal – third place	2018 Algiers	Women's doubles
Bronze medal – third place	2019 Port Harcourt	Women's doubles
Africa Team Championships
Silver medal – second place	2018 Algiers	Women's team

Peace Orji (born 20 December 1995) is a Nigerian badminton player. She participated in the 2019 African Games and won the gold medal in the mixed team event and a bronze medal in the mixed doubles.

== Achievements ==
=== African Games ===
Mixed doubles
Year	Venue	Partner	Opponent	Score	Result
2019	Ain Chock Indoor Sports Center; Casablanca, Morocco	(Nigeria) Enejoh Abah	(Egypt) Adham Hatem Elgamal (Egypt) Doha Hany	18–21, 21–13, 19–21	Bronze

=== African Championships ===
Women's doubles
Year	Venue	Partner	Opponent	Score	Result
2019	Alfred Diete-Spiff Centre; Port Harcourt, Nigeria	(Nigeria) Augustina Ebhomien Sunday	(Nigeria) Amin Yop Christopher (Nigeria) Chineye Ibere	16–21, 14–21	Bronze
2018	Salle OMS Harcha Hacéne; Algiers, Algeria	(Nigeria) Zainab Momoh	(Egypt) Doha Hany (Egypt) Hadia Hosny	11–21, 11–21	Bronze

Mixed doubles
Year	Venue	Partner	Opponent	Score	Result
2019	Alfred Diete-Spiff Centre; Port Harcourt, Nigeria	(Nigeria) Enejoh Abah	(Algeria) Koceila Mammeri (Algeria) Linda Mazri	21–15, 16–21, 18–21	Silver
2018	Salle OMS Harcha Hacéne; Algiers, Algeria	(Nigeria) Enejoh Abah	(Algeria) Koceila Mammeri (Algeria) Linda Mazri	17–21, 21–15, 12–21	Silver

=== BWF International Challenge/Series (2 titles, 2 runners-up) ===
Women's doubles
Year	Tournament	Partner	Opponent	Score	Result
2017	Benin International	(Nigeria) Uchechukwu Deborah Ukeh	(Nigeria) Dorcas Ajoke Adesokan (Nigeria) Tosin Atolagbe	18–21, 21–16, 12–21	(silver) Runner-up
2017	Côte d'Ivoire International	(Nigeria) Zainab Momoh	(India) Simran Singhi (India) Ritika Thaker	11–21, 14–21	(silver) Runner-up

Mixed doubles
Year	Tournament	Partner	Opponent	Score	Result
2017	Benin International	(Nigeria) Enejoh Abah	(Ghana) Emmanuel Donkor (Ghana) Stella Koteikai Amasah	21–14, 21–11	(gold) Winner
2017	Côte d'Ivoire International	(Nigeria) Enejoh Abah	(Nigeria) Gideon Babalola (Nigeria) Uchechukwu Deborah Ukeh	Walkover	(gold) Winner

BWF International Challenge tournament
BWF International Series tournament
BWF Future Series tournament
