= Abdelrahman Abdelhakim =

Egyptian badminton player (born 1996)

Personal information
- Born: Abdelrahman Abdelhakim; 8 November 1996 (age 30)

Sport
- Country: Egypt
- Sport: Badminton

Men's singles & doubles
- Highest ranking: 82 (MS 2 November 2017); 79 (MD 2 November 2017); 112 (XD 26 November 2015)
- BWF profile
Medal record
Men's badminton
Representing Egypt
African Games
Bronze medal – third place	2019 Rabat	Men's doubles
Bronze medal – third place	2019 Rabat	Mixed team
African Championships
Gold medal – first place	2017 Benoni	Mixed team
Gold medal – first place	2021 Kampala	Mixed team
Silver medal – second place	2021 Kampala	Men's doubles
Bronze medal – third place	2018 Algiers	Men's doubles
Bronze medal – third place	2019 Port Harcourt	Men's doubles
Bronze medal – third place	2019 Port Harcourt	Mixed team
Bronze medal – third place	2022 Kampala	Men's doubles
Africa Men's Team Championships
Silver medal – second place	2022 Kampala	Men's team
Bronze medal – third place	2020 Cairo	Men's team
Bronze medal – third place	2024 Cairo	Men's team

Abdelrahman Abdelhakim (born 8 November 1996) is an Egyptian badminton player. Represented Egypt in the Youth Olympic Games 2014 to become the second male Egyptian to qualify to the Olympics in Men's singles in history. a He was the bronze medalist at the 2019 African Games in the men's doubles and team events.

== Achievements ==
=== African Games ===
Men's doubles
Year	Venue	Partner	Opponent	Score	Result
2019	Ain Chock Indoor Sports Center; Casablanca, Morocco	(Egypt) Mohamed Mostafa Kamel	(Nigeria) Godwin Olofua (Nigeria) Anuoluwapo Juwon Opeyori	10–21, 14–21	Bronze

=== African Championships ===
Men's doubles
Year	Venue	Partner	Opponent	Score	Result
2018	Salle OMS Harcha Hacéne; Algiers, Algeria	(Egypt) Ahmed Salah	(Algeria) Adel Hamek (Algeria) Mohamed Abderrahime Belarbi	16–21, 18–21	Bronze
2019	Alfred Diete-Spiff Centre; Port Harcourt, Nigeria	(Egypt) Ahmed Salah	(Nigeria) Enejoh Abah (Nigeria) Isaac Minaphee	13–21, 10–21	Bronze
2021	MTN Arena; Kampala, Uganda	(Egypt) Ahmed Salah	(Algeria) Koceila Mammeri (Algeria) Youcef Sabri Medel	16–21, 13–21	Silver
2022	Lugogo Arena, Kampala, Uganda	(Egypt) Mohamed Mostafa Kamel	(Algeria) Koceila Mammeri (Algeria) Youcef Sabri Medel	17–21, 13–21	Bronze

=== BWF International Challenge/Series (3 titles, 2 runners-up) ===
Men's doubles
Year	Tournament	Partner	Opponent	Score	Result
2013	Morocco International	(Egypt) Adham Hatem Elgamal	(India) Vineeth Manuel (India) Arjun Reddy Pochana	12–21, 17–21	(silver) Runner-up
2013	Ethiopia International	(Egypt) Adham Hatem Elgamal	(Ethiopia) Seid Asrar (Ethiopia) Mekonen Gebrelu	21–17, 24–22	(gold) Winner
2016	Zambia International	(Egypt) Ahmed Salah	(Mauritius) Aatish Lubah (Mauritius) Georges Paul	21–15, 16–21, 18–21	(silver) Runner-up
2016	South Africa International	(Egypt) Ahmed Salah	(South Africa) Matthew Michel (South Africa) Prakash Vijayanath	21–16, 22–20	(gold) Winner

Mixed doubles
Year	Tournament	Partner	Opponent	Score	Result
2013	Ethiopia International	(Egypt) Doha Hany	(Egypt) Adham Hatem Elgamal (Egypt) Naja Mohamed	21–14, 21–11	(gold) Winner

BWF International Challenge tournament
BWF International Series tournament
BWF Future Series tournament
