= Tosin Damilola Atolagbe =

Nigerian badminton player (born 1994)

Personal information
- Born: 4 July 1994 (age 32)

Sport
- Country: Nigeria
- Sport: Badminton

Women's singles & doubles
- Highest ranking: 199 (WS 28 April 2016); 94 (WD 19 June 2014); 113 (XD 3 July 2014)
- BWF profile
Medal record
Women's badminton
Representing Nigeria
All-Africa Games
Gold medal – first place	2011 Maputo	Mixed team
Bronze medal – third place	2015 Brazzaville	Mixed team
African Championships
Silver medal – second place	2014 Gaborone	Mixed team
Silver medal – second place	2013 Rose Hill	Mixed team
Bronze medal – third place	2014 Gaborone	Women's doubles
Bronze medal – third place	2014 Gaborone	Mixed doubles
Africa Team Championships
Silver medal – second place	2012 Addis Ababa	Women's team

Tosin Damilola Atolagbe (born 4 July 1994) is a Nigerian badminton player.

== Achievements ==
=== African Championships ===
Women's doubles
Year	Venue	Partner	Opponent	Score	Result
2014	Lobatse Stadium; Gaborone, Botswana	(Nigeria) Fatima Azeez	(Mauritius) Kate Foo Kune (Mauritius) Yeldy Louison	16–21, 23–21, 17–21	Bronze

Mixed doubles
Year	Venue	Partner	Opponent	Score	Result
2014	Lobatse Stadium; Gaborone, Botswana	(Nigeria) Enejoh Abah	(South Africa) Andries Malan (South Africa) Jennifer Fry	16–21, 13–21	Bronze

=== BWF International Challenge/Series ===
Women's singles
Year	Tournament	Opponent	Score	Result
2013	Nigeria International	(Nigeria) Fatima Azeez	16–21, 21–15, 20–22	(silver) Runner-up

Women's doubles
Year	Tournament	Partner	Opponent	Score	Result
2017	Benin International	(Nigeria) Dorcas Ajoke Adesokan	(Nigeria) Peace Orji (Nigeria) Uchechukwu Deborah Ukeh	21–18, 16–21, 21–12	(gold) Winner
2014	Nigeria International	(Nigeria) Fatima Azeez	(Uganda) Bridget Shamim Bangi (Egypt) Hadia Hosny	5–11, 10–11, 10–11	(silver) Runner-up
2014	Lagos International	(Nigeria) Fatima Azeez	(Nigeria) Dorcas Ajoke Adesokan (Nigeria) Maria Braimoh	19–21, 20–22	(silver) Runner-up
2014	Uganda International	(Nigeria) Fatima Azeez	(Nigeria) Dorcas Ajoke Adesokan (Nigeria) Augustina Ebhomien Sunday	14–21, 21–9, 21–12	(gold) Winner
2013	Nigeria International	(Nigeria) Fatima Azeez	(Nigeria) Augustina Ebhomien Sunday (Nigeria) Uchechukwu Deborah Ukeh	18–21, 13–21	(silver) Runner-up

Mixed doubles
Year	Tournament	Partner	Opponent	Score	Result
2014	Lagos International	(Nigeria) Enejoh Abah	(South Africa) Andries Malan (South Africa) Jennifer Fry	26–24, 22–20	(gold) Winner
2014	Uganda International	(Nigeria) Enejoh Abah	(Nigeria) Ola Fagbemi (Nigeria) Dorcas Ajoke Adesokan	21–15, 10–21, 18–21	(silver) Runner-up
2013	Nigeria International	(Nigeria) Enejoh Abah	(Nigeria) Ola Fagbemi (Nigeria) Dorcas Ajoke Adesokan	12–21, 17–21	(silver) Runner-up

BWF International Challenge tournament
BWF International Series tournament
BWF Future Series tournament
