= Aatish Lubah =

Mauritian badminton player (born 1995)

Personal information
- Born: 3 November 1995 (age 31) Rivière du Rempart, Mauritius
- Height: 1.72 m (5 ft 8 in)
- Weight: 67 kg (148 lb)

Sport
- Country: Mauritius
- Sport: Badminton

Men's singles & doubles
- Highest ranking: 146 (MS 10 May 2018); 69 (MD 15 February 2018); 184 (XD 5 July 2018)
- BWF profile
Medal record
Men's badminton
Representing Mauritius
African Games
Gold medal – first place	2015 Brazzaville	Mixed team
Gold medal – first place	2019 Rabat	Men's doubles
African Championships
Silver medal – second place	2019 Port Harcourt	Mixed team
Silver medal – second place	2020 Cairo	Men's doubles
Bronze medal – third place	2013 Rose Hill	Men's doubles
Bronze medal – third place	2013 Rose Hill	Mixed team
Bronze medal – third place	2018 Algiers	Men's singles
All Africa Men's Team Championships
Silver medal – second place	2016 Rose Hill	Men's team
Silver medal – second place	2020 Cairo	Men's team
Bronze medal – third place	2018 Algiers	Men's team
Bronze medal – third place	2022 Kampala	Men's team

Aatish Lubah (born 3 November 1995) is a Mauritian badminton player. He was one of the 14 players selected for the Road to Rio Program, a program that aimed to help African badminton players to compete at the 2016 Olympic Games. Lubah competed at the 2014 and 2018 Commonwealth Games.

Lubah was a gold medalists at the 2015 Africa Games in the team event, and in 2019 in the men's doubles event.

== Achievements ==
=== African Games ===
Men's doubles
Year	Venue	Partner	Opponent	Score	Result
2019	Ain Chock Indoor Sports Center; Casablanca, Morocco	(Mauritius) Julien Paul	(Nigeria) Godwin Olofua (Nigeria) Anuoluwapo Juwon Opeyori	21–9, 21–18	Gold

=== African Championships ===
Men's singles
Year	Venue	Opponent	Score	Result
2018	Salle OMS Harcha Hacéne, Algiers, Algeria	(Nigeria) Habeeb Temitope Bello	14–21, 24–26	Bronze

Men's doubles
Year	Venue	Partner	Opponent	Score	Result
2013	National Badminton Centre; Rose Hill, Mauritius	(Mauritius) Julien Paul	(South Africa) Andries Malan (South Africa) Willem Viljoen	16–21, 14–21	Bronze
2020	Cairo Stadium Hall 2 Cairo, Egypt	(Mauritius) Julien Paul	(Algeria) Koceila Mammeri (Algeria) Youcef Sabri Medel	21–19, 14–21, 22–24	Silver

=== BWF International Challenge/Series (4 titles, 6 runners-up) ===
Men's singles
Year	Tournament	Opponent	Score	Result
2016	Rose Hill International	(Mauritius) Julien Paul	10–21, 17–21	(gold) Winner

Men's doubles
Year	Tournament	Partner	Opponent	Score	Result
2013	South Africa International	(Mauritius) Julien Paul	(Slovenia) Kek Jamnik (Slovenia) Alen Roj	22–20, 20–22, 22–20	(gold) Winner
2016	Zambia International	(Mauritius) Julien Paul	(Egypt) Abdelrahman Abdelhakim (Egypt) Ahmed Salah	15–21, 21–16, 21–18	(gold) Winner
2016	Botswana International	(Mauritius) Julien Paul	(India) Alwin Francis (India) Tarun Kona	12–21, 19–21	(silver) Runner-up
2017	Uganda International	(Mauritius) Julien Paul	(India) Alwin Francis (India) Tarun Kona	8–21, 14–21	(silver) Runner-up
2017	Mauritius International	(Mauritius) Julien Paul	(Italy) Fabio Caponio (Italy) Giovanni Toti	21–13, 21–23, 16–21	(silver) Runner-up
2017	Botswana International	(Mauritius) Julien Paul	(India) Adarsh Kumar (India) Jagadish Yadav	14–21, 22–20, 20–22	(silver) Runner-up
2017	Zambia International	(Mauritius) Julien Paul	(India) Kapil Chaudhary (India) Brijesh Yadav	21–17, 21–23, 21–11	(gold) Winner
2017	South Africa International	(Mauritius) Julien Paul	(India) Tarun Kona (India) Saurabh Sharma	9–21, 15–21	(silver) Runner-up
2019	Kenya International	(Mauritius) Julien Paul	(Algeria) Koceila Mammeri (Algeria) Youcef Sabri Medel	21–14, 20–22, 18–21	(silver) Runner-up

BWF International Challenge tournament
BWF International Series tournament
BWF Future Series tournament
