= Dorcas Ajoke Adesokan =

Nigerian badminton player (born 1998)

Personal information
- Born: 5 July 1998 (age 28) Ogun, Nigeria
- Height: 1.80 m (5 ft 11 in)
- Weight: 60 kg (132 lb)

Sport
- Country: Nigeria
- Sport: Badminton

Women's singles & doubles
- Highest ranking: 77 (WS 11 February 2020); 82 (WD 17 September 2019); 132 (XD 17 July 2014)
- BWF profile
Medal record
Women's badminton
Representing Nigeria
African Games
Gold medal – first place	2019 Rabat	Mixed team
Silver medal – second place	2019 Rabat	Women's singles
Silver medal – second place	2019 Rabat	Women's doubles
Bronze medal – third place	2023 Accra	Women's singles
Bronze medal – third place	2023 Accra	Women's doubles
African Championships
Gold medal – first place	2019 Port Harcourt	Women's singles
Gold medal – first place	2019 Port Harcourt	Women's doubles
Gold medal – first place	2019 Port Harcourt	Mixed team
Silver medal – second place	2013 Rose Hill	Mixed team
Silver medal – second place	2014 Gaborone	Mixed team
Silver medal – second place	2018 Algiers	Women's singles
Silver medal – second place	2020 Cairo	Women's singles
Silver medal – second place	2020 Cairo	Women's doubles
Bronze medal – third place	2014 Gaborone	Women's singles
Bronze medal – third place	2014 Gaborone	Mixed doubles
Bronze medal – third place	2017 Benoni	Women's singles
Bronze medal – third place	2017 Benoni	Women's doubles
Bronze medal – third place	2017 Benoni	Mixed team
Bronze medal – third place	2024 Cairo	Women's doubles
Africa Team Championships
Silver medal – second place	2018 Algiers	Women's team
Bronze medal – third place	2024 Cairo	Women's team
African Youth Games
Gold medal – first place	2014 Gaborone	Girls' singles
Gold medal – first place	2014 Gaborone	Girls' doubles
Gold medal – first place	2014 Gaborone	Mixed team

Dorcas Ajoke Adesokan (born 5 July 1998) is a Nigerian badminton player. She showed her talent at a young age, by winning two gold medals at the 2014 African Youth Games. In 2019, she won the women's singles and doubles titles at the African Championships. She competed in the 2020 Summer Olympics, by achieving the best women's singles ranking on the African continent in the Race to Tokyo rankings.

== Career ==
In 2014, she won bronze medals at the African Championships in the women's singles and mixed doubles event, and silver medal in the mixed team event. In June, she won Lagos International tournament in women's doubles events.

In 2019, she competed at the African Games, won a mixed team gold, also two silver medals in the women's singles and doubles events.

In 2021, she competed at the 2020 Summer Olympics.

In 2024, Adesokan competed at the African Championships in Cairo, Egypt. She managed to win the bronze medal in the women's doubles with a new partner, Sofiat Arinola Obanishola. Meanwhile, in the women's team, she also claimed the bronze medal after losing to Ugandan in the semi-finals. At the 2023 African Games in Ghana, she Adesokan won two bronze medals in the women's singles and doubles event partnering Obanishola.

== Achievements ==
=== African Games ===
Women's singles
Year	Venue	Opponent	Score	Result
2019	Ain Chock Indoor Sports Center, Casablanca, Morocco	(South Africa) Johanita Scholtz	19–21, 18–21	Silver
2023	Borteyman Sports Complex, Accra, Ghana	(Uganda) Husina Kobugabe	8–21, 19–21	Bronze

Women's doubles
Year	Venue	Partner	Opponent	Score	Result
2019	Ain Chock Indoor Sports Center; Casablanca, Morocco	(Nigeria) Uchechukwu Deborah Ukeh	(Egypt) Doha Hany (Egypt) Hadia Hosny	9–21, 16–21	Silver
2023	Borteyman Sports Complex; Accra, Ghana	(Nigeria) Sofiat Arinola Obanishola	(Algeria) Halla Bouksani (Algeria) Tanina Mammeri	17–21, 16–21	Bronze

=== African Championships ===
Women's singles
Year	Venue	Opponent	Score	Result
2014	Lobatse Stadium, Gaborone, Botswana	(Nigeria) Grace Gabriel	4–21, 15–21	Bronze
2017	John Barrable Hall, Benoni, South Africa	(Egypt) Hadia Hosny	21–13, 19–21, 13–21	Bronze
2018	Salle OMS Harcha Hacéne, Algiers, Algeria	(Mauritius) Kate Foo Kune	16–21, 19–21	Silver
2019	Alfred Diete-Spiff Centre, Port Harcourt, Nigeria	(Mauritius) Kate Foo Kune	21–12, 21–13	Gold
2020	Cairo Stadium Hall 2, Cairo, Egypt	(Mauritius) Kate Foo Kune	19–21, 16–21	Silver

Women's doubles
Year	Venue	Partner	Opponent	Score	Result
2017	John Barrable Hall; Benoni, South Africa	(Nigeria) Zainab Momoh	(Egypt) Doha Hany (Egypt) Hadia Hosny	4–21, 26–24, 18–21	Bronze
2019	Alfred Diete-Spiff Centre; Port Harcourt, Nigeria	(Nigeria) Uchechukwu Deborah Ukeh	(Nigeria) Amin Yop Christopher (Nigeria) Chineye Ibere	21–14, 20–22, 21–17	Gold
2020	Cairo Stadium Hall 2 Cairo, Egypt	(Nigeria) Uchechukwu Deborah Ukeh	(Egypt) Doha Hany (Egypt) Hadia Hosny	14–21, 17–21	Silver
2024	Cairo Stadium Indoor Halls Complex; Cairo, Egypt	(Nigeria) Sofiat Arinola Obanishola	(Uganda) Husina Kobugabe (Uganda) Gladys Mbabazi	21–18, 19–21, 18–21	Bronze

Mixed doubles
Year	Venue	Partner	Opponent	Score	Result
2014	Lobatse Stadium; Gaborone, Botswana	(Nigeria) Ola Fagbemi	(South Africa) Willem Viljoen (South Africa) Michelle Butler Emmett	17–21, 16–21	Bronze

=== African Youth Games ===
Girls' singles
Year	Venue	Opponent	Score	Result
2014	Otse Police College, Gaborone, Botswana	(South Africa) Janke van der Vyver	21–12, 21–15	Gold

Girls' doubles
Year	Venue	Partner	Opponent	Score	Result
2014	Otse Police College; Gaborone, Botswana	(Nigeria) Uchechukwu Deborah Ukeh	(Mauritius) Shaama Sandooyea (Mauritius) Aurélie Allet	21–15, 21–15	Gold

=== BWF International Challenge/Series (12 titles, 5 runners-up) ===
Women's singles
Year	Tournament	Opponent	Score	Result
2017	Benin International	(Nigeria) Uchechukwu Deborah Ukeh	21–7, 21–18	(gold) Winner
2018	Côte d'Ivoire International	(Nigeria) Chineye Ibere	21–10, 21–12	(gold) Winner
2018	Zambia International	(Zambia) Ogar Siamupangila	21–18, 21–15	(gold) Winner
2018	South Africa International	(Jordan) Domou Amro	22–20, 21–12	(gold) Winner
2019	Cameroon International	(Iran) Sorayya Aghaei	19–21, 12–21	(silver) Runner-up
2019	Zambia International	(Egypt) Doha Hany	20–22, 21–18, 21–18	(gold) Winner

Women's doubles
Year	Tournament	Partner	Opponent	Score	Result
2013	Kenya International	(Nigeria) Grace Gabriel	(Uganda) Bridget Shamim Bangi (Uganda) Margaret Nankabirwa	21–18, 21–9	(gold) Winner
2013	Mauritius International	(Nigeria) Grace Gabriel	(South Africa) Elme de Villiers (South Africa) Sandra le Grange	15–21, 16–21	(silver) Runner-up
2014	Uganda International	(Nigeria) Augustina Ebhomien Sunday	(Nigeria) Tosin Damilola Atolagbe (Nigeria) Fatima Azeez	21–14, 9–21, 12–21	(silver) Runner-up
2014	Lagos International	(Nigeria) Maria Braimoh	(Nigeria) Tosin Damilola Atolagbe (Nigeria) Fatima Azeez	21–19, 22–20	(gold) Winner
2017	Benin International	(Nigeria) Tosin Damilola Atolagbe	(Nigeria) Peace Orji (Nigeria) Uchechukwu Deborah Ukeh	21–18, 16–21, 21–12	(gold) Winner
2019	Ghana International	(Nigeria) Uchechukwu Deborah Ukeh	(India) K. Maneesha (India) Rutaparna Panda	11–21, 11–21	(silver) Runner-up

Mixed doubles
Year	Tournament	Partner	Opponent	Score	Result
2013	Nigeria International	(Nigeria) Ola Fagbemi	(Nigeria) Enejoh Abah (Nigeria) Tosin Damilola Atolagbe	21–12, 21–17	(gold) Winner
2014	Uganda International	(Nigeria) Ola Fagbemi	(Nigeria) Enejoh Abah (Nigeria) Tosin Damilola Atolagbe	15–21, 21–10, 21–18	(gold) Winner
2014	Nigeria International	(Nigeria) Ola Fagbemi	(Nigeria) Jinkan Ifraimu (Nigeria) Susan Ideh	11–8, 4–11, 11–7, 10–11, 8–11	(silver) Runner-up
2018	Côte d'Ivoire International	(Nigeria) Clement Krobakpo	(Zambia) Kalombo Mulenga (Zambia) Ogar Siamupangila	21–9, 21–15	(gold) Winner
2018	Zambia International	(Nigeria) Anuoluwapo Juwon Opeyori	(Jordan) Bahaedeen Ahmad Alshannik (Jordan) Domou Amro	21–19, 23–21	(gold) Winner

BWF International Challenge tournament
BWF International Series tournament
BWF Future Series tournament
