= James Hilton McManus =

South African badminton player (born 1992)

Personal information
- Born: 8 April 1992 (age 34)

Sport
- Country: South Africa
- Sport: Badminton

Men's
- Highest ranking: 477 (MS) 19 April 2012; 126 (MD) 29 March 2012; 275 (XD) 3 May 2012
- Current ranking: 284 (MD) 27 April 2017; 617 (XD) 27 April 2017
- BWF profile
Medal record
Badminton
Representing South Africa
African Championships
Gold medal – first place	2014 Gaborone	Mixed team
Gold medal – first place	2013 Rose Hill	Mixed team
Silver medal – second place	2017 Benoni	Men's doubles
Silver medal – second place	2017 Benoni	Mixed team

James Hilton McManus (born 8 April 1992) is a badminton player from South Africa. He won silver at African Badminton Championships with his partner, Andries Malan.

== Achievements ==
=== African Badminton Championships ===
Men's Doubles

Year	Venue	Partner	Opponent	Score	Result
2017	John Barrable Hall, Benoni, South Africa	(South Africa) Andries Malan	(Algeria) Koceila Mammeri (Algeria) Youcef Sabri Medel	21-13, 19-21, 9-21	Silver
