= Julien Paul =

Mauritian badminton player (born 1996)

Personal information
- Full name: Georges Julien Paul
- Born: 7 January 1996 (age 30) Curepipe, Mauritius
- Height: 1.80 m (5 ft 11 in)
- Weight: 87 kg (192 lb)

Sport
- Country: Mauritius
- Sport: Badminton

Men's singles & doubles
- Highest ranking: 78 (MS 17 March 2020); 69 (MD with Aatish Lubah 15 February 2018); 89 (XD with Kate Ludik 12 March 2024)
- BWF profile
Medal record
Men's badminton
Representing Mauritius
African Games
Gold medal – first place	2015 Brazzaville	Mixed team
Gold medal – first place	2019 Rabat	Men's doubles
Silver medal – second place	2019 Rabat	Men's singles
Bronze medal – third place	2019 Rabat	Mixed doubles
Bronze medal – third place	2023 Accra	Mixed doubles
African Championships
Gold medal – first place	2018 Algiers	Men's singles
Gold medal – first place	2020 Cairo	Men's singles
Silver medal – second place	2017 Benoni	Mixed doubles
Silver medal – second place	2020 Cairo	Men's doubles
Silver medal – second place	2023 Benoni	Men's singles
Silver medal – second place	2024 Cairo	Men's singles
Silver medal – second place	2025 Douala	Men's doubles
Bronze medal – third place	2013 Rose Hill	Men's doubles
Bronze medal – third place	2014 Gaborone	Men's doubles
Bronze medal – third place	2017 Benoni	Men's singles
Bronze medal – third place	2019 Port Harcourt	Men's singles
Bronze medal – third place	2024 Cairo	Mixed doubles
Bronze medal – third place	2025 Douala	Men's singles
Bronze medal – third place	2026 Gaborone	Men's singles
Bronze medal – third place	2026 Gaborone	Men's doubles
Africa Mixed Team Championships
Silver medal – second place	2019 Port Harcourt	Mixed team
Silver medal – second place	2023 Benoni	Mixed team
Silver medal – second place	2025 Douala	Mixed team
Bronze medal – third place	2013 Rose Hill	Mixed team
Bronze medal – third place	2014 Gaborone	Mixed team
Africa Men's Team Championships
Silver medal – second place	2016 Rose Hill	Men's team
Silver medal – second place	2020 Cairo	Men's team
Silver medal – second place	2026 Gaborone	Men's team
Bronze medal – third place	2018 Algiers	Men's team
Bronze medal – third place	2024 Cairo	Men's team
African Youth Games
Gold medal – first place	2014 Gaborone	Boys' singles
Gold medal – first place	2014 Gaborone	Boys' doubles
Gold medal – first place	2014 Gaborone	Mixed doubles
Bronze medal – third place	2014 Gaborone	Mixed team

Georges Julien Paul (born 7 January 1996) is a Mauritian badminton player. Paul took part at the 2014 African Youth Games, and won three gold medals in the individual event. He was part of the national team that won the gold medal at the 2015 African Games. Paul won the men's singles title at the 2018 and 2020 African Championships.

He competed at the 2014, 2018 and 2022 Commonwealth Games. Paul won a gold medal in the men's doubles, a silver in the singles, and a bronze in the mixed doubles at the 2019 African Games. At the All Africa Senior Championships in 2024, held in Cairo Egypt, Paul clinched Silver medal in Men's Singles.

Paul also represented Mauritius at the 2020 Summer Olympics and at the 2024 Summer Olympics.

== Achievements ==
=== African Games ===
Men's singles
Year	Venue	Opponent	Score	Result
2019	Ain Chock Indoor Sports Center, Casablanca, Morocco	(Nigeria) Anuoluwapo Juwon Opeyori	16–21, 17–21	Silver

Men's doubles
Year	Venue	Partner	Opponent	Score	Result
2019	Ain Chock Indoor Sports Center; Casablanca, Morocco	(Mauritius) Aatish Lubah	(Nigeria) Godwin Olofua (Nigeria) Anuoluwapo Juwon Opeyori	21–9, 21–18	Gold

Mixed doubles
Year	Venue	Partner	Opponent	Score	Result
2019	Ain Chock Indoor Sports Center; Casablanca, Morocco	(Mauritius) Aurélie Allet	(Algeria) Koceila Mammeri (Algeria) Linda Mazri	18–21, 22–20, 14–21	Bronze
2023	Borteyman Sports Complex; Accra, Ghana	(Mauritius) Kate Ludik	(Algeria) Koceila Mammeri (Algeria) Tanina Mammeri	13–21, 26–24, 15–21	Bronze

=== African Championships ===
Men's singles
Year	Venue	Opponent	Score	Result
2017	John Barrable Hall, Benoni, South Africa	(Algeria) Adel Hamek	21–15, 15–21, 20–22	Bronze
2018	Salle OMS Harcha Hacéne, Algiers, Algeria	(Nigeria) Habeeb Temitope Bello	21–16, 15–21, 21–13	Gold
2019	Alfred Diete-Spiff Centre, Port Harcourt, Nigeria	(Nigeria) Godwin Olofua	21–13, 14–21, 19–21	Bronze
2020	Cairo Stadium Hall 2, Cairo, Egypt	(Nigeria) Anuoluwapo Juwon Opeyori	16–21, 21–16, 23–21	Gold
2023	John Barrable Hall, Benoni, South Africa	(Nigeria) Anuoluwapo Juwon Opeyori	21–18, 13–21, 18–21	Silver
2024	Cairo Stadium Indoor Halls Complex, Cairo, Egypt	(Nigeria) Anuoluwapo Juwon Opeyori	21–23, 21–11, 16–21	Silver
2025	Gymnase de Japoma, Douala, Cameroon	(Egypt) Adham Hatem Elgamal	20–22, 19–21	Bronze
2026	Royal Aria, Gaborone, Botswana	(Mauritius) Jean Bernard Bongout	8–21, 8–21	Bronze

Men's doubles
Year	Venue	Partner	Opponent	Score	Result
2013	National Badminton Centre, Rose Hill, Mauritius	(Mauritius) Aatish Lubah	(South Africa) Andries Malan (South Africa) Willem Viljoen	16–21, 14–21	Bronze
2014	Lobatse Stadium, Gaborone, Botswana	(Mauritius) Deeneshing Baboolall	(Nigeria) Enejoh Abah (Nigeria) Victor Makanju	21–18, 18–21, 19–21	Bronze
2020	Cairo Stadium Hall 2, Cairo, Egypt	(Mauritius) Aatish Lubah	(Algeria) Koceila Mammeri (Algeria) Youcef Sabri Medel	21–19, 14–21, 22–24	Silver
2025	Gymnase de Japoma, Douala, Cameroon	(Mauritius) Jean Bernard Bongout	(Algeria) Koceila Mammeri (Algeria) Youcef Sabri Medel	19–21, 9–21	Silver
2026	Royal Aria, Gaborone, Botswana	(Mauritius) Jean Bernard Bongout	(Algeria) Koceila Mammeri (Algeria) Youcef Sabri Medel	16–21, 8–21	Bronze

Mixed doubles
Year	Venue	Partner	Opponent	Score	Result
2017	John Barrable Hall, Benoni, South Africa	(Mauritius) Kate Foo Kune	(South Africa) Andries Malan (South Africa) Jennifer Fry	19–21, 21–19, 19–21	Silver
2024	Cairo Stadium Indoor Halls Complex, Cairo, Egypt	(Mauritius) Kate Ludik	(Algeria) Koceila Mammeri (Algeria) Tanina Mammeri	6–21, 11–21	Bronze

=== African Youth Games ===
Boys' singles
Year	Venue	Opponent	Score	Result
2014	Otse Police College, Gaborone, Botswana	(Nigeria) Kingsley Nelson	21–10, 21–14	Gold

Boys' doubles
Year	Venue	Partner	Opponent	Score	Result
2014	Otse Police College; Gaborone, Botswana	(Mauritius) Kounal Soubbaroyan	(Algeria) Mohamed Guelmaoui (Algeria) Youcef Sabri Medel	21–19, 21–18	Gold

Mixed doubles
Year	Venue	Partner	Opponent	Score	Result
2014	Otse Police College; Gaborone, Botswana	(Mauritius) Aurélie Allet	(South Africa) Bongani von Bodenstein (South Africa) Anri Schoones	19–21, 21–8, 21–13	Gold

=== BWF International Challenge/Series (8 titles, 15 runners-up) ===
Men's singles
Year	Tournament	Opponent	Score	Result
2016	Rose Hill International	(Mauritius) Aatish Lubah	10–21, 17–21	(silver) Runner-up
2016	Zambia International	(Belgium) Maxime Moreels	12–21, 22–20, 16–21	(silver) Runner-up
2017	Uganda International	(Uganda) Edwin Ekiring	21–19, 7–11 (retired)	(gold) Winner
2017	South Africa International	(Belgium) Maxime Moreels	21–19, 15–21, 20–22	(silver) Runner-up
2019	Pakistan International	(Thailand) Saran Jamsri	14–21, 10–21	(silver) Runner-up
2023	Botswana International	(United Arab Emirates) Somi Romdhani	21–12, 22–20	(gold) Winner
2023	South Africa International	(England) Nadeem Dalvi	12–21, 21–23	(silver) Runner-up

Men's doubles
Year	Tournament	Partner	Opponent	Score	Result
2013	Mauritius International	(Mauritius) Denneshsing Baboolall	(South Africa) Andries Malan (South Africa) Willem Viljoen	11–21, 17–21	(silver) Runner-up
2013	South Africa International	(Mauritius) Aatish Lubah	(Slovenia) Kek Jamnik (Slovenia) Alen Roj	22–20, 20–22, 22–20	(gold) Winner
2016	Zambia International	(Mauritius) Aatish Lubah	(Egypt) Abdelrahman Abdelhakim (Egypt) Ahmed Salah	15–21, 21–16, 21–18	(gold) Winner
2016	Botswana International	(Mauritius) Aatish Lubah	(India) Alwin Francis (India) Tarun Kona	12–21, 19–21	(silver) Runner-up
2017	Uganda International	(Mauritius) Aatish Lubah	(India) Alwin Francis (India) Tarun Kona	8–21, 14–21	(silver) Runner-up
2017	Mauritius International	(Mauritius) Aatish Lubah	(Italy) Fabio Caponio (Italy) Giovanni Toti	21–13, 21–23, 16–21	(silver) Runner-up
2017	Botswana International	(Mauritius) Aatish Lubah	(India) Adarsh Kumar (India) Jagadish Yadav	14–21, 22–20, 20–22	(silver) Runner-up
2017	Zambia International	(Mauritius) Aatish Lubah	(India) Kapil Chaudhary (India) Brijesh Yadav	21–17, 21–23, 21–11	(gold) Winner
2017	South Africa International	(Mauritius) Aatish Lubah	(India) Tarun Kona (India) Saurabh Sharma	9–21, 15–21	(silver) Runner-up
2019	Kenya International	(Mauritius) Aatish Lubah	(Algeria) Koceila Mammeri (Algeria) Youcef Sabri Medel	21–14, 20–22, 18–21	(silver) Runner-up

Mixed doubles
Year	Tournament	Partner	Opponent	Score	Result
2014	Zambia International	(Mauritius) Kate Foo Kune	(Egypt) Ali Ahmed El-Khateeb (Egypt) Doha Hany	21–18, 21–14	(gold) Winner
2016	Botswana International	(Egypt) Hadia Hosny	(Russia) Anatoliy Yartsev (Russia) Evgeniya Kosetskaya	12–21, 10–21	(silver) Runner-up
2017	Botswana International	(Mauritius) Aurélie Allet	(South Africa) Andries Malan (South Africa) Jennifer Fry	15–21, 13–21	(silver) Runner-up
2018	Uganda International	(Mauritius) Aurélie Allet	(Germany) Jonathan Persson (Mauritius) Kate Foo Kune	11–21, 18–21	(silver) Runner-up
2018	Mauritius International	(Mauritius) Aurélie Allet	(Maldives) Sarim Mohamed (Maldives) Moosa Aminath Shahurunaz	21–14, 21–6	(gold) Winner
2023	Botswana International	(Mauritius) Kate Ludik	(Mauritius) Melvin Appiah (Mauritius) Vilina Appiah	21–10, 21–15	(gold) Winner

BWF International Challenge tournament
BWF International Series tournament
BWF Future Series tournament
