= Côte d'Ivoire International =

African badminton tournament

The Côte d'Ivoire International is an international badminton tournament held in Abidjan, Ivory Coast. The event is part of the Badminton World Federation's International Series and part of the Badminton Confederation of Africa's Circuit.

== Past winners ==
Year	Men's singles	Women's singles	Men's doubles	Women's doubles	Mixed doubles	Ref.
2016 FS	(Uganda) Edwin Ekiring	(Sri Lanka) Lekha Shehani	(Ivory Coast) Chandresh Kolleri Balakrishnan (Ivory Coast) Alex Patrick Zolobe	(Ivory Coast) Nogona Celine Bakayoko (Ivory Coast) Johanne Succar Saint-Blancat	(Nigeria) Gideon Babalola (Nigeria) Uchechukwu Deborah Ukeh	
2017 FS	(Nigeria) Anuoluwapo Juwon Opeyori	(India) Ritika Thaker	(Jordan) Bahaedeen Ahmad Alshannik (Jordan) Mohd Naser Mansour Nayef	(India) Simran Singhi (India) Ritika Thaker	(Nigeria) Enejoh Abah (Nigeria) Peace Orji	
2018 IS	(Mexico) Luis Ramón Garrido	(Nigeria) Dorcas Ajoke Adesokan	(Nigeria) Godwin Olofua (Nigeria) Anuoluwapo Juwon Opeyori	(Zambia) Evelyn Siamupangila (Zambia) Ogar Siamupangila	(Nigeria) Clement Krobakpo (Nigeria) Dorcas Ajoke Adesokan	
2019 IS	(India) Alap Mishra	(Myanmar) Thet Htar Thuzar	(Egypt) Adham Hatem Elgamal (Egypt) Ahmed Salah	(Iran) Samin Abedkhojasteh (Iran) Sorayya Aghaei	(United States) Howard Shu (United States) Paula Lynn Obañana	

== Performances by nation ==
Pos	Nation	MS	WS	MD	WD	XD	Total
1	Nigeria	1	1	1	0	3	6
2	India	1	1	0	1	0	3
3	Ivory Coast	0	0	1	1	0	2
4	Egypt	0	0	1	0	0	1
4	Iran	0	0	0	1	0	1
4	Jordan	0	0	1	0	0	1
4	Mexico	1	0	0	0	0	1
4	Myanmar	0	1	0	0	0	1
4	Sri Lanka	0	1	0	0	0	1
4	Uganda	1	0	0	0	0	1
4	United States	0	0	0	0	1	1
4	Zambia	0	0	0	1	0	1
Total		4	4	4	4	4	20
