= Emmanuel Donkor =

Ghanaian badminton player (born 1994)

Personal information
- Born: Emmanuel Yaw Donkor; 13 January 1994 (age 32) Sekondi-Takoradi, Ghana
- Years active: 2000
- Height: 1.73 m (5 ft 8 in)
- Weight: 68 kg (150 lb)

Sport
- Country: Ghana
- Sport: Badminton
- Handedness: Right
- Coached by: Philip Baah

Men's singles & doubles
- Highest ranking: 156 (MS 5 April 2018); 190 (MD 10 July 2014); 172 (XD 29 March 2018)
- BWF profile
Medal record
Men's badminton
Representing Ghana
Africa Team Championships
Bronze medal – third place	2018 Algiers	Men's team
Bronze medal – third place	2016 Rose Hill	Men's team

Emmanuel Yaw Donkor (born 13 January 1994) is a Ghanaian badminton player. He competed at the 2014 and 2018 Commonwealth Games. In 2016, he was the runner-up at the Rose Hill International tournament in the mixed doubles event partnered with Gifty Mensah. Teamed-up with Stella Amasah, they were the finalist at the 2017 Benin International tournament. He and Amasah also the semi-finalist at the Ivory Coast International tournament. He educated at the University of Cape Coast.

== Achievements ==
=== BWF International Challenge/Series ===
Mixed doubles

Year	Tournament	Partner	Opponent	Score	Result
2017	Benin International	(Ghana) Stella Koteikai Amasah	(Nigeria) Enejoh Abah (Nigeria) Peace Orji	14–21, 11–21	(silver) Runner-up
2016	Rose Hill International	(Ghana) Gifty Mensah	(Mauritius) Sahir Abdool Edoo (Mauritius) Yeldy Marie Louison	18–21, 29–27, 24–26	(silver) Runner-up

BWF International Challenge tournament
BWF International Series tournament
BWF Future Series tournament
