= Daisy Nakalyango =

Ugandan badminton player (born 1994)

Personal information
- Born: 15 March 1994 (age 32) Mbarara, Uganda
- Height: 1.79 m (5 ft 10 in)
- Weight: 65 kg (143 lb)

Sport
- Country: Uganda
- Sport: Badminton

Women's
- Highest ranking: 307 (WS) 26 Jun 2014; 237 (WD) 7 Jun 2012; 312 (XD) 17 May 2012
- BWF profile
Medal record
Badminton
Representing Uganda
Africa Team Championships
Bronze medal – third place	2016 Rose Hill	Women's team

Daisy Nakalyango (born 15 March 1994) is a Ugandan female badminton player. She competed at the 2010 and 2014 Commonwealth Games.

== Achievements ==
=== BWF International Challenge/Series ===
Women's Singles
Year	Tournament	Opponent	Score	Result
2015	Kampala International	(Uganda) Bridget Shamim Bangi	15-21, 7-21	(silver) Runner-up

Women's Doubles
Year	Tournament	Partner	Opponent	Score	Result
2016	Rose Hill International	(Uganda) Gloria Najjuka	(Zambia) Evelyn Siamupangila (Zambia) Ogar Siamupangila	21-18, 21-18	(gold) Winner
2015	Kampala International	(Uganda) Gloria Najjuka	(Uganda) Brenda Mugabi (Uganda) Aisha Nakiyemba	21–17, 21–11	(gold) Winner

Mixed Doubles
Year	Tournament	Partner	Opponent	Score	Result
2015	Kampala International	(Uganda) Herbert Ebayo	(Uganda) Davies Senono (Uganda) Mable Namakoye	21–14, 21–7	(gold) Winner

BWF International Challenge tournament
BWF International Series tournament
BWF Future Series tournament
