= Lagos International =

Badminton championships

- Sport: Badminton
- Founded: 2014
- Founder: Lagos State Badminton Association
- Country: Nigeria

The Lagos International also known as Lagos International Badminton Classics is an annual open international badminton tournament held in Lagos, Nigeria. This tournament established since 2014, organized by the Lagos State Badminton Association (LSBA) and Badminton Federation of Nigeria. The tournament sanctioned by the Badminton World Federation (BWF) and Badminton Confederation of Africa (BCA), and has grade as BWF International Challenge level with the total prize money $15,000. The classics is expected to help Nigerian players to improve their world ranking as well as play against some of the top rated players in the world, and it is also an opportunity to showcase the positive side of Lagos and Nigeria. It is also an intervention programme of the Lagos State Government, it is a series of international open sporting events geared towards attracting the best continental and global sports talents to the shores of the region. The Lagos State Government believes that the tournament is part of series of international sports events that will bring world stars to the state.

== Tournament ==
The first tournament was held at Mobolaji Johnson Sports Centre, Rowe Park, in Yaba, Lagos, and categorized as BWF International Challenge with the total prize money $15.000. A total 162 athletes from 15 countries drawn at the competition. The winners of the first edition were Misha Zilberman of Israel and Jeanine Cicognini of Italy in the men's and women's singles; Andries Malan and Willem Viljoen of South Africa in the men's doubles; then the host country pairs won the women's and mixed doubles, represented by Dorcas Ajoke Adesokan/Maria Braimoh, and Enejoh Abah/Tosin Damilola Atolagbe.

The second edition was held from 15 to 18 July 2015, attracted at least 28 countries, and the host country represented by 80 players. The vice-president of Nigeria Badminton Federation who also doubles as Chairman LSBA, Francis Orbih, said that this tournament is an initiative borne out of the need to create an international competition for home grown talents who don't participate in international tournaments. Lagos State Governor, Akinwunmi Ambode, gave the commitment at the finals and closing ceremony will continue to sponsor this tournament. At the end of the tournament, India clinched three title in the men's singles, men's and women's doubles, Czech Republic won the women's singles, and Poland in the mixed doubles.

In 2016, This tournament failed to hold due to the economic recession facing the country. The third edition then held between 25 and 29 July 2017, at the Molada Okoya Hall of the Teslim Balogun Stadium, Surulere. The prize money has increased to $20,000, and attracted 75 men's and 36 women's athletes.

== Previous winners ==
Year	Men's singles	Women's singles	Men's doubles	Women's doubles	Mixed doubles
2014	(Israel) Misha Zilberman	(Italy) Jeanine Cicognini	(South Africa) Andries Malan (South Africa) Willem Viljoen	(Nigeria) Dorcas Ajoke Adesokan (Nigeria) Maria Braimoh	(Nigeria) Enejoh Abah (Nigeria) Tosin Damilola Atolagbe
2015	(India) B. Sai Praneeth	(Czech Republic) Kristína Gavnholt	(India) Manu Attri (India) B. Sumeeth Reddy	(India) Pradnya Gadre (India) N. Sikki Reddy	(Poland) Robert Mateusiak (Poland) Nadieżda Zięba
2016	No competition				
2017	(India) Rahul Yadav Chittaboina	(Sri Lanka) Thilini Hendahewa	(India) Manu Attri (India) B. Sumeeth Reddy	(Sri Lanka) Thilini Hendahewa (Sri Lanka) Kavidi Sirimannage	(Israel) Misha Zilberman (Israel) Svetlana Zilberman
2018	(Israel) Misha Zilberman	(Israel) Ksenia Polikarpova	(India) Manu Attri (India) B. Sumeeth Reddy	(India) Riya Mookerjee (India) Kuhoo Garg	(India) Manu Attri (India) K. Maneesha
2019	(Vietnam) Nguyễn Tiến Minh	(Turkey) Neslihan Yiğit	(Germany) Jones Ralfy Jansen (Germany) Peter Käsbauer	(India) Pooja Dandu (India) Sanjana Santosh	(India) Arjun M.R. (India) K. Maneesha
2020	Cancelled (Note: This tournament, originally to be played from 1 to 4 July, was later cancelled due to COVID-19 pandemic in Nigeria.)				
2021	Cancelled (Note: This tournament, originally to be played from 3 to 6 November, was later cancelled due to COVID-19 pandemic in Nigeria.)				
2022	Cancelled (Note: This tournament, originally to be played from 31 August to 6 September, was later cancelled due to COVID-19 pandemic in Nigeria.)				
2023	(Brazil) Jonathan Matias	(Peru) Inés Castillo	(India) P.S Ravikrishna (India) Sankar Prasad Udayakumar	(India) Simran Singhi (India) Ritika Thaker	(Peru) José Guevara (Peru) Inés Castillo
2024	(Vietnam) Lê Đức Phát	(India) Shreya Lele	(India) Pruthvi Roy (India) Vishnuvardhan Goud Panjala	(India) Kavipriya Selvam (India) Simran Singhi	(India) Sathwik Reddy Kanapuram (India) Vaishnavi Khadkekar
2025	(Indonesia) Prahdiska Bagas Shujiwo	(India) Shreya Lele	(Individual Neutral Athletes) Rodion Alimov (Individual Neutral Athletes) Maksim Ogloblin	(Indonesia) Isyana Syahira Meida (Indonesia) Rinjani Kwinnara Nastine	(Indonesia) Bimo Prasetyo (Indonesia) Thesya Munggaran
2026	(India) Tankara Gnana Dattu Talasila	(United Arab Emirates) Prakriti Bharath	(Thailand) Thanawin Madee (Thailand) Pongsakorn Thongkham	(India) Rutaparna Panda (India) Swetaparna Panda	(India) Dhruv Rawat (India) K. Maneesha

== Performances by nation ==
As of the 2026 edition

Pos	Nation	MS	WS	MD	WD	XD	Total
1	India	3	2	5	6	4	20
2	Israel	2	1			1	4
3	Indonesia	1			1	1	3
4	Nigeria*				1	1	2
4	Peru		1			1	2
4	Sri Lanka		1		1		2
4	Vietnam	2					2
8	Authorised Neutral Athletes			1			1
8	Brazil	1					1
8	Czech Republic		1				1
8	Germany			1			1
8	Italy		1				1
8	Poland					1	1
8	South Africa			1			1
8	Thailand			1			1
8	Turkey		1				1
8	United Arab Emirates		1				1
Total		9	9	9	9	9	45

* Host nation
