= Enejoh Abah =

Nigerian badminton player (born 1990)

Personal information
- Born: Eneojo Joseph Abah; 16 February 1990 (age 36) Kogi State, Nigeria
- Height: 1.82 m (6 ft 0 in)
- Weight: 68 kg (150 lb)

Sport
- Country: Nigeria
- Sport: Badminton

Men'singles & doubles
- Highest ranking: 155 (MS 26 June 2014); 119 (MD 27 March 2014); 83 (XD 12 November 2014)
- BWF profile
Medal record
Men's badminton
Representing Nigeria
African Games
| Gold medal – first place | 2007 Algiers | Mixed team |
| Gold medal – first place | 2011 Maputo | Mixed team |
| Gold medal – first place | 2019 Rabat | Mixed team |
| Bronze medal – third place | 2015 Brazzaville | Men's doubles |
| Bronze medal – third place | 2015 Brazzaville | Mixed team |
| Bronze medal – third place | 2019 Rabat | Mixed doubles |
African Championships
| Gold medal – first place | 2019 Port Harcourt | Mixed team |
| Silver medal – second place | 2011 Marrakesh | Mixed team |
| Silver medal – second place | 2013 Rose Hill | Men's doubles |
| Silver medal – second place | 2013 Rose Hill | Mixed team |
| Silver medal – second place | 2014 Gaborone | Men's singles |
| Silver medal – second place | 2014 Gaborone | Men's doubles |
| Silver medal – second place | 2014 Gaborone | Mixed team |
| Silver medal – second place | 2018 Algiers | Mixed doubles |
| Silver medal – second place | 2019 Port Harcourt | Men's doubles |
| Silver medal – second place | 2019 Port Harcourt | Mixed doubles |
| Bronze medal – third place | 2011 Marrakesh | Men's doubles |
| Bronze medal – third place | 2011 Marrakesh | Mixed doubles |
| Bronze medal – third place | 2012 Addis Ababa | Men's singles |
| Bronze medal – third place | 2012 Addis Ababa | Men's doubles |
| Bronze medal – third place | 2014 Gaborone | Mixed doubles |
| Bronze medal – third place | 2020 Cairo | Men's doubles |
Africa Team Championships
| Silver medal – second place | 2012 Addis Ababa | Men's team |
| Silver medal – second place | 2018 Algiers | Men's team |

Eneojo Joseph Abah // (born 16 February 1990) is a Nigerian badminton player. Abah hails from Kogi State, North Central Nigeria. He started playing badminton in 2003. He was selected to represent Nigeria in an international tournament in 2005 at the African Junior Championships in Ethiopia. In 2010, he competed at the Commonwealth Games in New Delhi, India.

== Achievements ==
=== African Games ===
Men's doubles
| Year | Venue | Partner | Opponent | Score | Result |
|---|---|---|---|---|---|
| 2015 | Gymnase Étienne Mongha; Brazzaville, Republic of the Congo | (Nigeria) Victor Makanju | (Egypt) Ali Ahmed El Khateeb (Egypt) Abdelrahman Kashkal | 8–21, 15–21 | Bronze |

Mixed doubles
| Year | Venue | Partner | Opponent | Score | Result |
|---|---|---|---|---|---|
| 2019 | Ain Chock Indoor Sports Center; Casablanca, Morocco | (Nigeria) Peace Orji | (Egypt) Adham Hatem Elgamal (Egypt) Doha Hany | 18–21, 21–13, 19–21 | Bronze |

=== African Championships ===
Men's singles
| Year | Venue | Opponent | Score | Result |
|---|---|---|---|---|
| 2014 | Lobatse Stadium, Gaborone, Botswana | (South Africa) Jacob Maliekal | 11–21, 17–21 | Silver |
| 2012 | Arat Kilo Hall, Addis Ababa, Ethiopia | (South Africa) Jacob Maliekal | 18–21, 17–21 | Bronze |

Men's doubles
| Year | Venue | Partner | Opponent | Score | Result |
|---|---|---|---|---|---|
| 2020 | Cairo Stadium Hall 2 Cairo, Egypt | (Nigeria) Isaac Minaphee | (Algeria) Koceila Mammeri (Algeria) Youcef Sabri Medel | 18–21, 11–21 | Bronze |
| 2019 | Alfred Diete-Spiff Centre; Port Harcourt, Nigeria | (Nigeria) Isaac Minaphee | (Algeria) Koceila Mammeri (Algeria) Youcef Sabri Medel | 18–21, 17–21 | Silver |
| 2014 | Lobatse Stadium; Gaborone, Botswana | (Nigeria) Victor Makanju | (South Africa) Andries Malan (South Africa) Willem Viljoen | 8–21, 15–21 | Silver |
| 2013 | National Badminton Centre; Rose Hill, Mauritius | (Nigeria) Victor Makanju | (South Africa) Andries Malan (South Africa) Willem Viljoen | 11–21, 12–21 | Silver |
| 2012 | Arat Kilo Hall; Addis Ababa, Ethiopia | (Nigeria) Victor Makanju | (South Africa) Dorian James (South Africa) Willem Viljoen | 13–21, 9–21 | Bronze |
| 2011 | Marrakesh, Morocco | (Nigeria) Victor Makanju | (South Africa) Willem Viljoen (South Africa) Dorian James | 15–21, 9–21 | Bronze |

Mixed doubles
| Year | Venue | Partner | Opponent | Score | Result |
|---|---|---|---|---|---|
| 2019 | Alfred Diete-Spiff Centre; Port Harcourt, Nigeria | (Nigeria) Peace Orji | (Algeria) Koceila Mammeri (Algeria) Linda Mazri | 21–15, 16–21, 18–21 | Silver |
| 2018 | Salle OMS Harcha Hacéne; Algiers, Algeria | (Nigeria) Peace Orji | (Algeria) Koceila Mammeri (Algeria) Linda Mazri | 17–21, 21–15, 12–21 | Silver |
| 2014 | Lobatse Stadium; Gaborone, Botswana | (Nigeria) Tosin Damilola Atolagbe | (South Africa) Andries Malan (South Africa) Jennifer Fry | 16–21, 13–21 | Bronze |
| 2011 | Marrakesh, Morocco | (Nigeria) Grace Gabriel | (South Africa) Willem Viljoen (South Africa) Annari Viljoen | 13–21, 8–21 | Bronze |

=== BWF International Challenge/Series (5 titles, 5 runners-up) ===
Men's singles
| Year | Tournament | Opponent | Score | Result |
|---|---|---|---|---|
| 2013 | Nigeria International | (Nigeria) Jinkan Ifraimu Bulus | 17–21, 18–21 | (silver) Runner-up |

Men's doubles
| Year | Tournament | Partner | Opponent | Score | Result |
|---|---|---|---|---|---|
| 2017 | Benin International | (Nigeria) Ibrahim Adamu | (Jordan) Bahaedeen Ahmad Alshannik (Jordan) Mohd Naser Mansour Nayef | 15–21, 21–19, 21–18 | (gold) Winner |
| 2014 | Nigeria International | (Nigeria) Victor Makanju | (Nigeria) Jinkan Ifraimu Bulus (Nigeria) Ola Fagbemi | 11–10, 5–11, 8–11, 9–11 | (silver) Runner-up |
| 2013 | Nigeria International | (Nigeria) Victor Makanju | (Nigeria) Jinkan Ifraimu Bulus (Nigeria) Ola Fagbemi | 20–22, 19–21 | (silver) Runner-up |
| 2013 | Kenya International | (Nigeria) Victor Makanju | (Nigeria) Adamu J (India) Siddhrath Saboo | 21–17, 21–15 | (gold) Winner |

Mixed doubles
| Year | Tournament | Partner | Opponent | Score | Result |
|---|---|---|---|---|---|
| 2017 | Benin International | (Nigeria) Peace Orji | (Ghana) Emmanuel Donkor (Ghana) Stella Koteikai Amasah | 21–14, 21–11 | (gold) Winner |
| 2017 | Ivory Coast International | (Nigeria) Peace Orji | (Nigeria) Gideon Babalola (Nigeria) Uchechukwu Deborah Ukeh | Walkover | (gold) Winner |
| 2014 | Lagos International | (Nigeria) Tosin Damilola Atolagbe | (South Africa) Andries Malan (South Africa) Jennifer Fry | 26–24, 22–20 | (gold) Winner |
| 2014 | Uganda International | (Nigeria) Tosin Damilola Atolagbe | (Nigeria) Ola Fagbemi (Nigeria) Dorcas Ajoke Adesokan | 21–15, 10–21, 18–21 | (silver) Runner-up |
| 2013 | Nigeria International | (Nigeria) Tosin Damilola Atolagbe | (Nigeria) Ola Fagbemi (Nigeria) Dorcas Ajoke Adesokan | 12–21, 17–21 | (silver) Runner-up |

BWF International Challenge tournament
BWF International Series tournament
BWF Future Series tournament
