= Badminton at the 2011 All-Africa Games – Mixed team =

Badminton – Mixed team at the 2011 All-Africa Games
- Venue: Escola Josina Machel Hall
- Dates: 6 – 8 September 2011

Medalists
gold medal	Nigeria
silver medal	South Africa
bronze medal	Seychelles
bronze medal	Mauritius

The mixed team badminton event at the 2011 All-Africa Games was held from 6 to 8 September at the Escola Josina Machel Hall in Maputo. 13 teams competed in this event. Egypt withdrew from the competition and only participated in the individual events.

== Schedule ==
All times based on Central Africa Time (UTC+02:00)

Date	Time	Event
Tuesday, 6 September 2011	09:00	Group stage
Tuesday, 6 September 2011	14:00	Group stage
Tuesday, 6 September 2011	19:00	Group stage
Wednesday, 7 September 2011	14:00	Semi-finals
Thursday, 8 September 2011	14:00	Gold medal match

== Competition format ==
Thirteen teams were drawn into groups of four. The winner in each group advance to the knockout stage. Each tie consists of five matches, one for each discipline (men's / women's singles, men's / women's / mixed doubles). In the knockout stage, the winner of each group will face the runner-up of the opposite group.

== Group stage ==
=== Group 1 ===
Pos	Team	Pld	W	L	MF	MA	MD	GF	GA	GD	PF	PA	PD	Pts	Qualification
1	Mauritius	1	1	0	5	0	+5	10	0	+10	210	23	+187	1	Knockout stage
2	DR Congo	1	0	1	0	5	−5	0	10	−10	23	210	−187	0	
3	Egypt	0	0	0	0	0	0	0	0	0	0	0	0	0	Withdrew

Source: Todor 66

Mauritius
5
Escola Josina Machel
6 September 2011

DR Congo
0

			1	2	3
1	(Mauritius) (Democratic Republic of the Congo)	Denneshsing Baboolall; Bukasa Harmen Tshibangu	21; 2	21; 3
2	(Mauritius) (Democratic Republic of the Congo)	Karen Foo Kune; Ndiadi Arlette Mbueno	21; 1	21; 1
3	(Mauritius) (Democratic Republic of the Congo)	Denneshsing Baboolall / Yoni Louison; Bulaya John Kisimba / Bukasa Harmen Tshibangu	21; 1	21; 2
4	(Mauritius) (Democratic Republic of the Congo)	Karen Foo Kune / Priscilla Pillay Vinayagam; Ndiadi Arlette Mbueno / Badineila Benedicte Tshilaba	21; 5	21; 3
5	(Mauritius) (Democratic Republic of the Congo)	Yoni Louison / Priscilla Pillay Vinayagam; Bulaya John Kisimba / Ndiadi Arlette Mbueno	21; 2	21; 3

=== Group 2 ===
Pos	Team	Pld	W	L	MF	MA	MD	GF	GA	GD	PF	PA	PD	Pts	Qualification
1	Seychelles	2	2	0	9	1	+8	19	1	+18	418	252	+166	2	Knockout stage
2	Uganda	2	1	1	6	4	+2	7	9	−2	296	294	+2	1	
3	Mozambique (H)	2	0	2	0	10	−10	0	16	−16	168	336	−168	0	

Source: Todor 66
(H) Host

Seychelles
5
Escola Josina Machel
6 September 2011

Mozambique
0

			1	2	3
1	(Seychelles) (Mozambique)	Steve Malcouzanne; Idrisse Issofo Mossagy	21; 15	21; 10
2	(Seychelles) (Mozambique)	Cynthia Course; Suzezte da Cruz	21; 8	21; 10
3	(Seychelles) (Mozambique)	Georgie Cupidon / Steve Malcouzanne; Armando Inharugué / Lucio Lampiao	21; 13	21; 7
4	(Seychelles) (Mozambique)	Allisen Camille / Cynthia Course; Narcisa Inacio Siyawadya / Suzezte da Cruz	21; 6	21; 5
5	(Seychelles) (Mozambique)	Georgie Cupidon / Allisen Camille; Ibrahimo Issofo Mossagy / Narcisa Inacio Siyawadya	21; 4	21; 4

Seychelles
4
Escola Josina Machel
6 September 2011

Uganda
1

			1	2	3
1	(Seychelles) (Uganda)	Steve Malcouzanne; Edwin Ekiring	21; 13	21; 11
2	(Seychelles) (Uganda)	Cynthia Course; Bridget Shamim Bangi	21; 13	15; 21	21; 19
3	(Seychelles) (Uganda)	Georgie Cupidon / Steve Malcouzanne; Edwin Ekiring / Wilson Tukire	21; 19	21; 14
4	(Seychelles) (Uganda)	Allisen Camille / Cynthia Course; Bridget Shamim Bangi / Margaret Nankabirwa	21; 18	4; 5		retired
5	(Seychelles) (Uganda)	Georgie Cupidon / Allisen Camille; Wilson Tukire / Margaret Nankabirwa	21; 18	21; 19

Uganda
5
Escola Josina Machel
6 September 2011

Mozambique
0

			1	2	3
1	(Uganda) (Mozambique)	Edwin Ekiring; Ibrahimo Issofo Mossagy	21; 16	21; 14
2	(Uganda) (Mozambique)	Margaret Nankabirwa; Narcisa Inacio Siyawadya	21; 10	21; 10
3	(Uganda) (Mozambique)	Edwin Ekiring / Wilson Tukire; Armando Inharugué / Lucio Lampiao	21; 17	21; 19
4	(Uganda) (Mozambique)	Bridget Shamim Bangi / Margaret Nankabirwa; Suzezte da Cruz / Narcisa Inacio Siyawadya				w/o
5	(Uganda) (Mozambique)	Wilson Tukire / Margaret Nankabirwa; Idrisse Issofo Mossagy / Suzezte da Cruz				w/o

=== Group 3 ===
Pos	Team	Pld	W	L	MF	MA	MD	GF	GA	GD	PF	PA	PD	Pts	Qualification
1	Nigeria	2	2	0	10	0	+10	18	0	+18	378	187	+191	2	Knockout stage
2	Ghana	2	1	1	3	2	+1	7	14	−7	316	390	−74	1	
3	Kenya	2	0	2	2	3	−1	4	15	−11	267	384	−117	0	

Source: Todor 66

Nigeria
5
Escola Josina Machel
6 September 2011

Ghana
0

			1	2	3
1	(Nigeria) (Ghana)	Jinkan Ifraimu; Daniel Aryee	21; 15	21; 17
2	(Nigeria) (Ghana)	Susan Ideh; Gifty Mensah	21; 11	21; 8
3	(Nigeria) (Ghana)	Ola Fagbemi / Jinkan Ifraimu; Solomon Mensah Nyarko / Daniel Sam	21; 13	21; 7
4	(Nigeria) (Ghana)	Fatima Azeez / Grace Daniel; Stella Amasah / Linda Osei Hammond	21; 7	21; 11
5	(Nigeria) (Ghana)	Ibrahim Adamu / Grace Daniel; Daniel Sam / Stella Amasah	21; 6	21; 5

Nigeria
5
Escola Josina Machel
6 September 2011

Kenya
0

			1	2	3
1	(Nigeria) (Kenya)	Ola Fagbemi; Patrick Kinyua Mbogo	21; 7	21; 14
2	(Nigeria) (Kenya)	Grace Gabriel; Mercy Joseph	21; 9	21; 13
3	(Nigeria) (Kenya)	Ola Fagbemi / Jinkan Ifraimu; Patrick Kinyua Mbogo / Matheri Joseph Githitu	21; 10	21; 15
4	(Nigeria) (Kenya)	Fatima Azeez / Grace Daniel; Sheila Gakii / Mercy Joseph	21; 6	21; 13
5	(Nigeria) (Kenya)	Ibrahim Adamu / Grace Daniel; Matheri Joseph Githitu / Lavina Martins				w/o

Ghana
3
Escola Josina Machel
6 September 2011

Kenya
2

			1	2	3
1	(Ghana) (Kenya)	Daniel Aryee; Patrick Kinyua Mbogo	21; 17	21; 10
2	(Ghana) (Kenya)	Linda Osei Hammond; Mercy Joseph	13; 21	14; 21
3	(Ghana) (Kenya)	Solomon Mensah Nyarko / Daniel Sam; Patrick Kinyua Mbogo / Matheri Joseph Githitu	21; 18	21; 14
4	(Ghana) (Kenya)	Stella Amasah / Linda Osei Hammond; Sheila Gakii / Mercy Joseph	22; 20	20; 22	21; 23
5	(Ghana) (Kenya)	Solomon Mensah Nyarko / Stella Amasah; Matheri Joseph Githitu / Lavina Martins	21; 7	21; 7

=== Group 4 ===
Pos	Team	Pld	W	L	MF	MA	MD	GF	GA	GD	PF	PA	PD	Pts	Qualification
1	South Africa	3	3	0	15	0	+15	30	0	+30	630	248	+382	3	Knockout stage
2	Botswana	3	2	1	8	7	+1	17	17	0	553	573	−20	2	
3	Ethiopia	3	1	2	5	10	−5	13	20	−7	531	583	−52	1	
4	Congo	3	0	3	2	13	−11	4	27	−23	328	638	−310	0	

Source: Todor 66

South Africa
5
Escola Josina Machel
6 September 2011

Ethiopia
0

			1	2	3
1	(South Africa) (Ethiopia)	Jacob Maliekal; Asnake Getachew Sahilu	21; 8	21; 13
2	(South Africa) (Ethiopia)	Michelle Butler-Emmett; Yerusksew Legssey Tura	21; 12	21; 14
3	(South Africa) (Ethiopia)	Dorian James / Willem Viljoen; Ermiyas Tamrat Degefe / Asnake Getachew Sahilu	21; 7	21; 13
4	(South Africa) (Ethiopia)	Stacey Doubell / Annari Viljoen; Mistre Manyazewal Girma / Yerusksew Legssey Tura	21; 9	21; 8
5	(South Africa) (Ethiopia)	Willem Viljoen / Annari Viljoen; Ermiyas Tamrat Degefe / Yerusksew Legssey Tura	21; 7	21; 10

South Africa
5
Escola Josina Machel
6 September 2011

Congo
0

			1	2	3
1	(South Africa) (Republic of the Congo)	Enrico James; Dimitri Mbongo	21; 13	21; 13
2	(South Africa) (Republic of the Congo)	Stacey Doubell; Yunees Malandhat	21; 3	21; 3
3	(South Africa) (Republic of the Congo)	Dorian James / Willem Viljoen; Dimitri Mbongo / Sanat Mouanda	21; 8	21; 3
4	(South Africa) (Republic of the Congo)	Stacey Doubell / Annari Viljoen; Marcelle Nina Mackaya / Yunees Malandhat	21; 6	21; 2
5	(South Africa) (Republic of the Congo)	Enrico James / Stacey Doubell; Dimitri Mbongo / Yunees Malandhat	21; 6	21; 8

South Africa
5
Escola Josina Machel
6 September 2011

Botswana
0

			1	2	3
1	(South Africa) (Botswana)	Jacob Maliekal; Oreeditse Thela	21; 7	21; 10
2	(South Africa) (Botswana)	Michelle Butler-Emmett; Botho Makubate	21; 17	21; 2
3	(South Africa) (Botswana)	Dorian James / Willem Viljoen; Gaone Tawana / Oreeditse Thela	21; 6	21; 7
4	(South Africa) (Botswana)	Stacey Doubell / Annari Viljoen; Kgalalelo Kegakilwe / Botho Makubate	21; 8	21; 2
5	(South Africa) (Botswana)	Willem Viljoen / Annari Viljoen; Oreeditse Thela / Botho Makubate	21; 9	21; 14

Botswana
4
Escola Josina Machel
6 September 2011

Ethiopia
1

			1	2	3
1	(Botswana) (Ethiopia)	Oreeditse Thela; Asnake Getachew Sahilu	21; 15	21; 13
2	(Botswana) (Ethiopia)	Kgalalelo Kegakilwe; Yerusksew Legssey Tura	15; 21	13; 21
3	(Botswana) (Ethiopia)	Gaone Tawana / Oreeditse Thela; Ermiyas Tamrat Degefe / Asnake Getachew Sahilu	17; 21	21; 15	21; 13
4	(Botswana) (Ethiopia)	Kgalalelo Kegakilwe / Botho Makubate; Mistre Manyazewal Girma / Yerusksew Legssey Tura	21; 19	17; 21	21; 19
5	(Botswana) (Ethiopia)	Gaone Tawana / Kgalalelo Kegakilwe; Ermiyas Tamrat Degefe / Yerusksew Legssey Tura	21; 16	15; 21	21; 13

Botswana
4
Escola Josina Machel
6 September 2011

Congo
1

			1	2	3
1	(Botswana) (Republic of the Congo)	Gaone Tawana; Dimitri Mbongo	17; 21	23; 21	18; 21
2	(Botswana) (Republic of the Congo)	Botho Makubate; Yunees Malandhat	21; 4	21; 5
3	(Botswana) (Republic of the Congo)	Gaone Tawana / Oreeditse Thela; Dimitri Mbongo / Sanat Mouanda	21; 18	21; 18
4	(Botswana) (Republic of the Congo)	Kgalalelo Kegakilwe / Botho Makubate; Marcelle Nina Mackaya / Yunees Malandhat	21; 8	21; 6
5	(Botswana) (Republic of the Congo)	Gaone Tawana / Kgalalelo Kegakilwe; Sanat Mouanda / Marcelle Nina Mackaya	21; 8	21; 5

Ethiopia
4
Escola Josina Machel
6 September 2011

Congo
1

			1	2	3
1	(Ethiopia) (Republic of the Congo)	Ermiyas Tamrat Degefe; Dimitri Mbongo	14; 21	20; 22
2	(Ethiopia) (Republic of the Congo)	Yerusksew Legssey Tura; Marcelle Nina Mackaya	21; 9	21; 5
3	(Ethiopia) (Republic of the Congo)	Ermiyas Tamrat Degefe / Asnake Getachew Sahilu; Dimitri Mbongo / Sanat Mouanda	21; 12	21; 15
4	(Ethiopia) (Republic of the Congo)	Mistre Manyazewal Girma / Yerusksew Legssey Tura; Marcelle Nina Mackaya / Yunees Malandhat	21; 9	21; 6
5	(Ethiopia) (Republic of the Congo)	Asnake Getachew Sahilu / Mistre Manyazewal Girma; Dimitri Mbongo / Yunees Malandhat	21; 13	21; 16

== Knockout stage ==
Semi-finals
Mauritius	0
South Africa	4
Nigeria	3
Seychelles	1

Gold medal match
South Africa	2
Nigeria	3

=== Semi-finals ===
South Africa
4
Escola Josina Machel
7 September 2011

Mauritius
0

			1	2	3
1	(South Africa) (Mauritius)	Enrico James; Deeneshing Baboolall	21; 15	15; 21	21; 12
2	(South Africa) (Mauritius)	Stacey Doubell; Karen Foo Kune	21; 10	21; 8
3	(South Africa) (Mauritius)	Dorian James / Willem Viljoen; Deeneshing Baboolall / Yoni Louison	21; 6	21; 6
4	(South Africa) (Mauritius)	Stacey Doubell / Annari Viljoen; Karen Foo Kune / Priscilla Pillay Vinayagam				not played
5	(South Africa) (Mauritius)	Enrico James / Stacey Doubell; Yoni Louison / Priscilla Pillay Vinayagam	21; 13	21; 18

Nigeria
3
Escola Josina Machel
7 September 2011

Seychelles
1

			1	2	3
1	(Nigeria) (Seychelles)	Enejoh Abah; Steve Malcouzanne	21; 16	21; 7
2	(Nigeria) (Seychelles)	Susan Ideh; Allisen Camille	21; 15	21; 12
3	(Nigeria) (Seychelles)	Ola Fagbemi / Jinkan Ifraimu; Georgie Cupidon / Steve Malcouzanne	23; 21	14; 21	22; 20
4	(Nigeria) (Seychelles)	Susan Ideh / Grace Daniel; Stella Amasah / Linda Osei Hammond				not played
5	(Nigeria) (Seychelles)	Ibrahim Adamu / Grace Daniel; Georgie Cupidon / Cynthia Course	21; 11	20; 22	19; 21

=== Gold medal match ===
Nigeria
3
Escola Josina Machel
8 September 2011

South Africa
2

			1	2	3
1	(Nigeria) (South Africa)	Jinkan Ifraimu; Jacob Maliekal	20; 22	21; 14	15; 21
2	(Nigeria) (South Africa)	Susan Ideh; Stacey Doubell	21; 11	21; 16
3	(Nigeria) (South Africa)	Ola Fagbemi / Jinkan Ifraimu; Dorian James / Willem Viljoen	21; 18	21; 14
4	(Nigeria) (South Africa)	Susan Ideh / Grace Daniel; Stacey Doubell / Annari Viljoen	21; 14	21; 12
5	(Nigeria) (South Africa)	Enejoh Abah / Grace Daniel; Willem Viljoen / Annari Viljoen	8; 21	18; 21
