= Badminton at the 2015 African Games – Mixed team =

Badminton – Mixed team at the 2015 African Games
- Venue: Gymnase Étienne Mongha
- Dates: 2 – 5 September 2015

Medalists
| gold medal | Mauritius |
| silver medal | South Africa |
| bronze medal | Nigeria |
| bronze medal | Seychelles |

The mixed team badminton event at the 2015 African Games was held from 2 to 5 September at the Gymnase Étienne Mongha in Brazzaville.

== Schedule ==
All times based on West Africa Time (UTC+01:00)

| Date | Time | Event |
|---|---|---|
| Wednesday, 2 September 2015 | 14:30 | Group stage |
| Wednesday, 2 September 2015 | 18:00 | Group stage |
| Thursday, 3 September 2015 | 10:00 | Group stage |
| Thursday, 3 September 2015 | 16:00 | Group stage |
| Friday, 4 September 2015 | 10:00 | Quarter-finals |
| Saturday, 5 September 2015 | 10:00 | Semi-finals |
| Saturday, 5 September 2015 | 16:00 | Gold medal match |

== Competition format ==
Thirteen teams were drawn into groups of four. The top two teams in each group advance to the knockout stage. Each tie consists of five matches, one for each discipline (men's / women's singles, men's / women's / mixed doubles).

== Group stage ==
=== Group A ===
| Pos | Team | Pld | W | L | MF | MA | MD | GF | GA | GD | PF | PA | PD | Pts | Qualification |
|---|---|---|---|---|---|---|---|---|---|---|---|---|---|---|---|
| 1 | Mauritius | 2 | 2 | 0 | 9 | 1 | +8 | 19 | 3 | +16 | 441 | 268 | +173 | 2 | Knockout stage |
| 2 | Ghana | 2 | 1 | 1 | 6 | 4 | +2 | 13 | 9 | +4 | 372 | 361 | +11 | 1 | Knockout stage |
| 3 | Congo (H) | 2 | 0 | 2 | 0 | 10 | −10 | 0 | 20 | −20 | 237 | 421 | −184 | 0 | |

Source: TS
(H) Host

Mauritius
5
Gymnase Étienne Mongha, Court 1
2 September 2015, 14:30 UTC+1

Congo
0

| | | | 1 | 2 | 3 |
|---|---|---|---|---|---|
| 1 | (Mauritius) (Republic of the Congo) | Kate Foo Kune; Aïsse Soukouna | 21; 6 | 21; 8 |
| 2 | (Mauritius) (Republic of the Congo) | Julien Paul; Dimitri Mbongo | 21; 16 | 21; 18 |
| 3 | (Mauritius) (Republic of the Congo) | Kate Foo Kune / Yeldy Louison; Minelie Kassangoyi / Bztecho Loubaki | 21; 5 | 21; 6 |
| 4 | (Mauritius) (Republic of the Congo) | Aatish Lubah / Christopher Paul; Pitchou I / Sanat Mouanda | 21; 14 | 21; 12 |
| 5 | (Mauritius) (Republic of the Congo) | Christopher Paul / Yeldy Louison; Dimitri Mbongo / Aïsse Soukouna | 21; 6 | 21; 16 |

Ghana
5
Gymnase Étienne Mongha, Court 1
2 September 2015, 18:00 UTC+1

Congo
0

| | | | 1 | 2 | 3 |
|---|---|---|---|---|---|
| 1 | (Ghana) (Republic of the Congo) | Emmanuel Yaw Donkor / Gifty Mensah; Jonathan Bikoumou / Aïsse Soukouna | 21; 13 | 21; 9 |
| 2 | (Ghana) (Republic of the Congo) | Daniel Sam; Dimitri Mbongo | 21; 14 | 22; 20 |
| 3 | (Ghana) (Republic of the Congo) | Gifty Mensah; Aïsse Soukouna | 21; 13 | 21; 14 |
| 4 | (Ghana) (Republic of the Congo) | Daniel Sam / Emmanuel Yaw Donkor; Jonathan Bikoumou / Dimitri Mbongo | 21; 5 | 21; 11 |
| 5 | (Ghana) (Republic of the Congo) | Victoria Asmah / Grace Atipaka; Minelie Kassangoyi / Bztecho Loubaki | 21; 13 | 21; 18 |

Mauritius
4
Gymnase Étienne Mongha
3 September 2015, 10:00 UTC+1

Ghana
1

| | | | 1 | 2 | 3 |
|---|---|---|---|---|---|
| 1 | (Mauritius) (Ghana) | Christopher Paul / Yeldy Louison; Emmanuel Yaw Donkor / Gifty Mensah | 21; 16 | 21; 13 |
| 2 | (Mauritius) (Ghana) | Julien Paul; Daniel Sam | 15; 21 | 21; 16 | 12; 21 |
| 3 | (Mauritius) (Ghana) | Kate Foo Kune; Gifty Mensah | 21; 6 | 21; 5 |
| 4 | (Mauritius) (Ghana) | Aatish Lubah / Julien Paul; Daniel Sam / Emmanuel Yaw Donkor | 15; 21 | 21; 9 | 21; 9 |
| 5 | (Mauritius) (Ghana) | Kate Foo Kune / Yeldy Louison; Victoria Asmah / Grace Atipaka | 21; 8 | 21; 16 |

=== Group B ===
| Pos | Team | Pld | W | L | MF | MA | MD | GF | GA | GD | PF | PA | PD | Pts | Qualification |
|---|---|---|---|---|---|---|---|---|---|---|---|---|---|---|---|
| 1 | Nigeria | 2 | 2 | 0 | 8 | 2 | +6 | 17 | 5 | +12 | 435 | 298 | +137 | 2 | Knockout stage |
| 2 | Uganda | 2 | 1 | 1 | 6 | 4 | +2 | 13 | 9 | +4 | 396 | 348 | +48 | 1 | Knockout stage |
| 3 | Botswana | 2 | 0 | 2 | 1 | 9 | −8 | 3 | 19 | −16 | 267 | 452 | −185 | 0 | |

Source: TS

Nigeria
5
Gymnase Étienne Mongha, Court 3
2 September 2015, 14:30 UTC+1

Botswana
0

| | | | 1 | 2 | 3 |
|---|---|---|---|---|---|
| 1 | (Nigeria) (Botswana) | Olorunfemi Elewa / Susan Ideh; Oreeditse Thela / Kgalalelo Kegakilwe | 21; 16 | 21; 12 |
| 2 | (Nigeria) (Botswana) | Clement Krobakpo; Gaone Tawana | 18; 21 | 21; 11 | 21; 16 |
| 3 | (Nigeria) (Botswana) | Tosin Damilola Atolagbe; Botho Makubate | 21; 0 | 21; 0 |
| 4 | (Nigeria) (Botswana) | Enejoh Abah / Victor Makanju; Gaone Tawana / Oreeditse Thela | 21; 17 | 21; 15 |
| 5 | (Nigeria) (Botswana) | Grace Gabriel / Maria Braimoh; Kgalalelo Kegakilwe / Botho Makubate | 21; 7 | 21; 11 |

Uganda
4
Gymnase Étienne Mongha, Court 3
2 September 2015, 18:00 UTC+1

Botswana
1

| | | | 1 | 2 | 3 |
|---|---|---|---|---|---|
| 1 | (Uganda) (Botswana) | Brian Kasirye / Daisy Nakalyango; Oreeditse Thela / Kgalalelo Kegakilwe | 21; 23 | 21; 12 | 14; 21 |
| 2 | (Uganda) (Botswana) | Edwin Ekiring; Gaone Tawana | 21; 5 | 21; 10 |
| 3 | (Uganda) (Botswana) | Bridget Shamim Bangi; Botho Makubate | 21; 10 | 21; 6 |
| 4 | (Uganda) (Botswana) | Edwin Ekiring / Brian Kasirye; Gaone Tawana / Oreeditse Thela | 21; 19 | 21; 15 |
| 5 | (Uganda) (Botswana) | Bridget Shamim Bangi / Daisy Nakalyango; Kgalalelo Kegakilwe / Botho Makubate | 21; 13 | 21; 7 |

Nigeria
3
Gymnase Étienne Mongha, Court 3
3 September 2015, 10:00 UTC+1

Uganda
2

| | | | 1 | 2 | 3 |
|---|---|---|---|---|---|
| 1 | (Nigeria) (Uganda) | Olorunfemi Elewa / Maria Braimoh; Brian Kasirye / Daisy Nakalyango | 21; 11 | 21; 10 |
| 2 | (Nigeria) (Uganda) | Enejoh Abah; Edwin Ekiring | 9; 21 | 15; 21 |
| 3 | (Nigeria) (Uganda) | Grace Gabriel; Bridget Shamim Bangi | 21; 23 | 21; 12 | 15; 21 |
| 4 | (Nigeria) (Uganda) | Ola Fagbemi / Jinkan Ifraimu; Edwin Ekiring / Brian Kasirye | 21; 12 | 21; 12 |
| 5 | (Nigeria) (Uganda) | Tosin Damilola Atolagbe / Susan Ideh; Bridget Shamim Bangi / Daisy Nakalyango | 21; 13 | 21; 16 |

=== Group C ===
| Pos | Team | Pld | W | L | MF | MA | MD | GF | GA | GD | PF | PA | PD | Pts | Qualification |
|---|---|---|---|---|---|---|---|---|---|---|---|---|---|---|---|
| 1 | South Africa | 2 | 2 | 0 | 9 | 1 | +8 | 16 | 4 | +12 | 405 | 282 | +123 | 2 | Knockout stage |
| 2 | Egypt | 2 | 1 | 1 | 6 | 4 | +2 | 14 | 6 | +8 | 373 | 339 | +34 | 1 | Knockout stage |
| 3 | Kenya | 2 | 0 | 2 | 0 | 10 | −10 | 0 | 20 | −20 | 266 | 423 | −157 | 0 | |

Source: TS

South Africa
5
Gymnase Étienne Mongha, Court 4
2 September 2015, 14:30 UTC+1

Kenya
0

| | | | 1 | 2 | 3 |
|---|---|---|---|---|---|
| 1 | (South Africa) (Kenya) | Willem Viljoen / Michelle Butler-Emmett; Patrick Kinyua Mbogo / Lavina Martins | 21; 12 | 21; 18 |
| 2 | (South Africa) (Kenya) | Jacob Maliekal; Victor Odera | 21; 9 | 21; 4 |
| 3 | (South Africa) (Kenya) | Elme de Villiers; Mercy Joseph | 21; 11 | 22; 20 |
| 4 | (South Africa) (Kenya) | Andries Malan / Willem Viljoen; Matheri Joseph Githitu / Patrick Kinyua Mbogo | 21; 14 | 21; 6 |
| 5 | (South Africa) (Kenya) | Jennifer Fry / Sandra le Grange; Mercy Joseph / Lavina Martins | 21; 16 | 21; 11 |

Egypt
5
Gymnase Étienne Mongha, Court 4
2 September 2015, 18:00 UTC+1

Kenya
0

| | | | 1 | 2 | 3 |
|---|---|---|---|---|---|
| 1 | (Egypt) (Kenya) | Abdelrahman Kashkal / Hadia Hosny; Patrick Kinyua Mbogo / Lavina Martins | 21; 7 | 21; 14 |
| 2 | (Egypt) (Kenya) | Ali Ahmed El-Khateeb; Victor Odera | 21; 15 | 21; 10 |
| 3 | (Egypt) (Kenya) | Doha Hany; Mercy Joseph | 21; 18 | 21; 17 |
| 4 | (Egypt) (Kenya) | Abdelrahman Abdelhakim / Ahmed Salah; Patrick Kinyua Mbogo / Victor Odera | 21; 11 | 21; 14 |
| 5 | (Egypt) (Kenya) | Nadine Ashraf / Menna El-Tanany; Mercy Joseph / Lavina Martins | 23; 21 | 21; 18 |

South Africa
4
Gymnase Étienne Mongha, Court 4
3 September 2015, 10:00 UTC+1

Egypt
1

| | | | 1 | 2 | 3 |
|---|---|---|---|---|---|---|
| 1 | (South Africa) (Egypt) | Andries Malan / Willem Viljoen; Ali Ahmed El-Khateeb / Abdelrahman Kashkal | 21; 23 | 21; 15 | 21; 19 |
| 2 | (South Africa) (Egypt) | Elme de Villiers; Hadia Hosny | 16; 21 | 16; 21 |
| 3 | (South Africa) (Egypt) | Jacob Maliekal; Ahmed Salah | 15; 21 | 21; 9 | 21; 12 |
| 4 | (South Africa) (Egypt) | Jennifer Fry / Sandra le Grange; Menna El-Tanany / Doha Hany | 21; 11 | 21; 9 |
| 5 | (South Africa) (Egypt) | Willem Viljoen / Michelle Butler-Emmett; Abdelrahman Kashkal / Hadia Hosny | | | | w/o |

=== Group D ===
| Pos | Team | Pld | W | L | MF | MA | MD | GF | GA | GD | PF | PA | PD | Pts | Qualification |
|---|---|---|---|---|---|---|---|---|---|---|---|---|---|---|---|
| 1 | Seychelles | 3 | 3 | 0 | 14 | 1 | +13 | 29 | 2 | +27 | 646 | 288 | +358 | 3 | Knockout stage |
| 2 | Algeria | 3 | 2 | 1 | 11 | 4 | +7 | 22 | 9 | +13 | 567 | 379 | +188 | 2 | Knockout stage |
| 3 | Ethiopia | 3 | 1 | 2 | 5 | 10 | −5 | 10 | 20 | −10 | 384 | 500 | −116 | 1 | |
| 4 | DR Congo | 3 | 0 | 3 | 0 | 15 | −15 | 0 | 30 | −30 | 200 | 630 | −430 | 0 | |

Source: TS

Seychelles
5
Gymnase Étienne Mongha, Court 4
2 September 2015, 14:30 UTC+1

DR Congo
0

| | | | 1 | 2 | 3 |
|---|---|---|---|---|---|
| 1 | (Seychelles) (Democratic Republic of the Congo) | Kervin Ghislain; Mutombo Tshizanga | 21; 7 | 21; 7 |
| 2 | (Seychelles) (Democratic Republic of the Congo) | Allisen Camille; Kanda Mabuta | 21; 3 | 21; 2 |
| 3 | (Seychelles) (Democratic Republic of the Congo) | Kervin Ghislain / Steve Malcouzanne; Nathan Okito / Mutombo Tshizanga | 21; 5 | 21; 8 |
| 4 | (Seychelles) (Democratic Republic of the Congo) | Allisen Camille / Cynthia Course; Kanda Mabuta / Katambua Odia | 21; 4 | 21; 2 |
| 5 | (Seychelles) (Democratic Republic of the Congo) | Georgie Cupidon / Juliette Ah-Wan; Mutombo Tshizanga / Kanda Mabuta | 21; 5 | 21; 7 |

Algeria
5
Gymnase Étienne Mongha, Court 2
2 September 2015, 14:30 UTC+1

Ethiopia
0

| | | | 1 | 2 | 3 |
|---|---|---|---|---|---|
| 1 | (Algeria) (Ethiopia) | Adel Hamek / Baya Nesrine; Yakob Surafel / Berhanu Samrawit | 21; 7 | 21; 6 |
| 2 | (Algeria) (Ethiopia) | Youcef Sabri Medel; Asnake Getachew Sahilu | 21; 9 | 21; 6 |
| 3 | (Algeria) (Ethiopia) | Halla Bouksani; Yerusksew Legssey Tura | 21; 6 | 21; 6 |
| 4 | (Algeria) (Ethiopia) | Mohamed Abderrahime Belarbi / Adel Hamek; Endale Teklu / Asnake Getachew Sahilu | 21; 9 | 21; 8 |
| 5 | (Algeria) (Ethiopia) | Linda Mazri / Baya Nesrine; Berhanu Samrawit / Yerusksew Legssey Tura | 21; 16 | 21; 10 |

Seychelles
5
Gymnase Étienne Mongha, Court 2
2 September 2015, 18:00 UTC+1

Ethiopia
0

| | | | 1 | 2 | 3 |
|---|---|---|---|---|---|
| 1 | (Seychelles) (Ethiopia) | Kervin Ghislain / Allisen Camille; Asnake Getachew Sahilu / Berhanu Samrawit | 21; 4 | 21; 7 |
| 2 | (Seychelles) (Ethiopia) | Steve Malcouzanne; Yakob Surafel | 21; 9 | 21; 12 |
| 3 | (Seychelles) (Ethiopia) | Cynthia Course; Yerusksew Legssey Tura | 21; 14 | 21; 2 |
| 4 | (Seychelles) (Ethiopia) | Georgie Cupidon / Kervin Ghislain; Endale Teklu / Asnake Getachew Sahilu | 21; 7 | 21; 17 |
| 5 | (Seychelles) (Ethiopia) | Juliette Ah-Wan / Allisen Camille; Berhanu Samrawit / Yerusksew Legssey Tura | 21; 12 | 21; 7 |

Algeria
5
Gymnase Étienne Mongha, Court 2
3 September 2015, 10:00 UTC+1

DR Congo
0

| | | | 1 | 2 | 3 |
|---|---|---|---|---|---|
| 1 | (Algeria) (Democratic Republic of the Congo) | Mohamed Guelmaoui / Baya Nesrine; Mutombo Tshizanga / Kanda Mabuta | 21; 6 | 21; 9 |
| 2 | (Algeria) (Democratic Republic of the Congo) | Mohamed Abderrahime Belarbi; Nathan Okito | 21; 5 | 21; 5 |
| 3 | (Algeria) (Democratic Republic of the Congo) | Halla Bouksani; Katambua Odia | 21; 5 | 21; 6 |
| 4 | (Algeria) (Democratic Republic of the Congo) | Yacoub Benadda / Adel Hamek; Nathan Okito / Mutombo Tshizanga | 21; 11 | 21; 12 |
| 5 | (Algeria) (Democratic Republic of the Congo) | Halla Bouksani / Linda Mazri; Kanda Mabuta / Katambua Odia | 21; 7 | 21; 4 |

Seychelles
4
Gymnase Étienne Mongha, Court 1
3 September 2015, 16:00 UTC+1

Algeria
1

| | | | 1 | 2 | 3 |
|---|---|---|---|---|---|
| 1 | (Seychelles) (Algeria) | Georgie Cupidon / Juliette Ah-Wan; Adel Hamek / Baya Nesrine | 21; 9 | 21; 12 |
| 2 | (Seychelles) (Algeria) | Steve Malcouzanne; Youcef Sabri Medel | 21; 8 | 22; 20 |
| 3 | (Seychelles) (Algeria) | Cynthia Course; Halla Bouksani | 21; 13 | 21; 11 |
| 4 | (Seychelles) (Algeria) | Georgie Cupidon / Steve Malcouzanne; Mohamed Abderrahime Belarbi / Adel Hamek | 21; 15 | 18; 21 | 18; 21 |
| 5 | (Seychelles) (Algeria) | Allisen Camille / Cynthia Course; Linda Mazri / Baya Nesrine | 21; 12 | 21; 5 |

Ethiopia
5
Gymnase Étienne Mongha, Court 3
3 September 2015, 16:00 UTC+1

DR Congo
0

| | | | 1 | 2 | 3 |
|---|---|---|---|---|---|
| 1 | (Ethiopia) (Democratic Republic of the Congo) | Endale Teklu / Yerusksew Legssey Tura; Nathan Okito / Katambua Odia | 21; 9 | 21; 12 |
| 2 | (Ethiopia) (Democratic Republic of the Congo) | Berhanu Samrawit; Kanda Mabuta | 21; 6 | 21; 6 |
| 3 | (Ethiopia) (Democratic Republic of the Congo) | Endale Teklu; Mutombo Tshizanga | 21; 10 | 21; 4 |
| 4 | (Ethiopia) (Democratic Republic of the Congo) | Berhanu Samrawit / Yerusksew Legssey Tura; Kanda Mabuta / Katambua Odia | 21; 6 | 21; 4 |
| 5 | (Ethiopia) (Democratic Republic of the Congo) | Asnake Getachew Sahilu / Yakob Surafel; Nathan Okito / Mutombo Tshizanga | 21; 8 | 21; 15 |

== Knockout stage ==
Quarter-finals
South Africa | 3
Uganda | 1
Seychelles | 3
Algeria | 1
Ghana | 1
Mauritius | 3
Egypt | 1
Nigeria | 3

Semi-finals
South Africa | 3
Seychelles | 0
Mauritius | 3
Nigeria | 0

Gold medal match
South Africa | 2
Mauritius | 3

=== Quarter-finals ===
South Africa
3
Gymnase Étienne Mongha, Court 3
4 September 2015, 10:00 UTC+1

Uganda
1

| | | | 1 | 2 | 3 |
|---|---|---|---|---|---|---|
| 1 | (South Africa) (Uganda) | Andries Malan / Jennifer Fry; Brian Kasirye / Daisy Nakalyango | 21; 10 | 21; 10 |
| 2 | (South Africa) (Uganda) | Jacob Maliekal; Edwin Ekiring | 21; 19 | 24; 22 |
| 3 | (South Africa) (Uganda) | Elme de Villiers; Bridget Shamim Bangi | 13; 21 | 18; 21 |
| 4 | (South Africa) (Uganda) | Andries Malan / Willem Viljoen; Edwin Ekiring / Brian Kasirye | 21; 11 | 21; 11 |
| 5 | (South Africa) (Uganda) | Jennifer Fry / Sandra le Grange; Bridget Shamim Bangi / Daisy Nakalyango | | | | not played |

Seychelles
3
Gymnase Étienne Mongha, Court 2
4 September 2015, 10:00 UTC+1

Algeria
1

| | | | 1 | 2 | 3 |
|---|---|---|---|---|---|---|
| 1 | (Seychelles) (Algeria) | Steve Malcouzanne; Youcef Sabri Medel | 16; 21 | 21; 19 | 15; 21 |
| 2 | (Seychelles) (Algeria) | Cynthia Course; Halla Bouksani | 21; 15 | 16; 21 | 21; 13 |
| 3 | (Seychelles) (Algeria) | Georgie Cupidon / Steve Malcouzanne; Mohamed Abderrahime Belarbi / Adel Hamek | 23; 21 | 19; 21 | 21; 19 |
| 4 | (Seychelles) (Algeria) | Allisen Camille / Cynthia Course; Halla Bouksani / Linda Mazri | 21; 8 | 21; 13 |
| 5 | (Seychelles) (Algeria) | Georgie Cupidon / Juliette Ah-Wan; Adel Hamek / Baya Nesrine | | | | not played |

Mauritius
3
Gymnase Étienne Mongha, Court 1
4 September 2015, 10:00 UTC+1

Ghana
1

| | | | 1 | 2 | 3 |
|---|---|---|---|---|---|---|
| 1 | (Mauritius) (Ghana) | Christopher Paul / Yeldy Louison; Daniel Sam / Gifty Mensah | 22; 20 | 14; 21 | 21; 14 |
| 2 | (Mauritius) (Ghana) | Nicki Chan-Lam; Grace Atipaka | 21; 4 | 21; 7 |
| 3 | (Mauritius) (Ghana) | Aatish Lubah; Emmanuel Yaw Donkor | 16; 21 | 13; 21 |
| 4 | (Mauritius) (Ghana) | Kate Foo Kune / Yeldy Louison; Victoria Asmah / Gifty Mensah | 21; 9 | 21; 8 |
| 5 | (Mauritius) (Ghana) | Aatish Lubah / Julien Paul; Daniel Sam / Emmanuel Yaw Donkor | | | | not played |

Nigeria
3
Gymnase Étienne Mongha, Court 4
4 September 2015, 10:00 UTC+1

Egypt
1

| | | | 1 | 2 | 3 |
|---|---|---|---|---|---|---|
| 1 | (Nigeria) (Egypt) | Ola Fagbemi / Maria Braimoh; Abdelrahman Kashkal / Hadia Hosny | 21; 19 | 21; 18 |
| 2 | (Nigeria) (Egypt) | Enejoh Abah; Ahmed Salah | 17; 21 | 17; 21 |
| 3 | (Nigeria) (Egypt) | Ola Fagbemi / Jinkan Ifraimu; Ali Ahmed El-Khateeb / Abdelrahman Kashkal | 21; 13 | 21; 19 |
| 4 | (Nigeria) (Egypt) | Grace Gabriel; Nadine Ashraf | 21; 8 | 21; 7 |
| 5 | (Nigeria) (Egypt) | Tosin Damilola Atolagbe / Susan Ideh; Doha Hany / Hadia Hosny | | | | not played |

=== Semi-finals ===
South Africa
3
Gymnase Étienne Mongha, Court 1
4 September 2015, 10:00 UTC+1

Seychelles
0

| | | | 1 | 2 | 3 |
|---|---|---|---|---|---|---|
| 1 | (South Africa) (Seychelles) | Andries Malan / Jennifer Fry; Georgie Cupidon / Juliette Ah-Wan | 21; 14 | 21; 18 |
| 2 | (South Africa) (Seychelles) | Jacob Maliekal; Kervin Ghislain | 21; 13 | 21; 7 |
| 3 | (South Africa) (Seychelles) | Elme de Villiers; Allisen Camille | 21; 14 | 21; 10 |
| 4 | (South Africa) (Seychelles) | Andries Malan / Willem Viljoen; Georgie Cupidon / Steve Malcouzanne | | | | not played |
| 5 | (South Africa) (Seychelles) | Jennifer Fry / Sandra le Grange; Juliette Ah-Wan / Allisen Camille | | | | not played |

Nigeria
0
Gymnase Étienne Mongha, Court 4
4 September 2015, 10:00 UTC+1

Mauritius
3

| | | | 1 | 2 | 3 |
|---|---|---|---|---|---|---|
| 1 | (Nigeria) (Mauritius) | Tosin Damilola Atolagbe; Nicki Chan-Lam | 13; 21 | 12; 21 |
| 2 | (Nigeria) (Mauritius) | Clement Krobakpo; Julien Paul | 10; 21 | 22; 20 | 15; 21 |
| 3 | (Nigeria) (Mauritius) | Grace Gabriel / Maria Braimoh; Kate Foo Kune / Yeldy Louison | 12; 21 | 22; 20 | 19; 21 |
| 4 | (Nigeria) (Mauritius) | Ola Fagbemi / Jinkan Ifraimu; Aatish Lubah / Julien Paul | | | | not played |
| 5 | (Nigeria) (Mauritius) | Enejoh Abah / Susan Ideh; Julien Paul / Kate Foo Kune | | | | not played |

=== Gold medal match ===
South Africa
2
Gymnase Étienne Mongha, Court 1
5 September 2015, 16:00 UTC+1

Mauritius
3

| | | | 1 | 2 | 3 |
|---|---|---|---|---|---|
| 1 | (South Africa) (Mauritius) | Andries Malan / Jennifer Fry; Julien Paul / Kate Foo Kune | 17; 21 | 21; 15 | 17; 21 |
| 2 | (South Africa) (Mauritius) | Jacob Maliekal; Christopher Paul | 21; 10 | 21; 9 |
| 3 | (South Africa) (Mauritius) | Andries Malan / Willem Viljoen; Aatish Lubah / Julien Paul | 21; 14 | 21; 11 |
| 4 | (South Africa) (Mauritius) | Elme de Villiers; Nicki Chan-Lam | 10; 21 | 9; 21 |
| 5 | (South Africa) (Mauritius) | Jennifer Fry / Sandra le Grange; Kate Foo Kune / Yeldy Louison | 19; 21 | 7; 21 |
