= 2010 Thomas & Uber Cups Preliminaries for Africa =

Tournament details
- Dates: 20–23 February 2010
- Edition: 4
- Venue: Sharing Youth Centre
- Location: Kampala, Uganda

The 2010 Thomas & Uber Cups Preliminaries for Africa were held in Kampala, Uganda, between 20 and 23 February and organised by Uganda Badminton Association. Nigeria and South Africa was the defending champion in men's and women's team events. This tournament serves as qualification stage for African countries for the 2010 Thomas & Uber Cup.

== Medalists ==
- Men's Team

Medal	Team	Players
Gold	Nigeria	Ibrahim Adamu, Jinkan Bulus, Enejoh Abah, Olaoluwa Fagbemi, Ocholi Edicha
Silver	Mauritius	Stephan Beeharry, Sahir Edoo, Yoni Dany Louison, Saheer Ramrakha
Bronze	Egypt	Ali Ahmed El Khateeb, Abdelrahman Kashkal, Ahmed Reda, Ahmed Salah
Bronze	South Africa	Robert Abrahams, Roelof Dednam, Dorian James, Jacob Maliekal, Wiaan Viljoen

- Women's Team

Medal	Team	Players
Gold	South Africa	Stacey Doubell, Michelle Edwards, Kerry-Lee Harrington, Jade Morgan, Annari Viljoen
Silver	Egypt	Hadia Hosny, Dina Nagy, Noran Hassan El Banna, Alaa Youssef
Bronze	Burundi	Muriel Kezakimana, Feniste Ndihokubwayo, Aline Nininahazwe, Jeanine Nkurunziza
Bronze	Nigeria	Maria Hajara Braimoh, Susan Ideh, Ketu Ilofuan, Grace Gabriel Ofodile, Imhade Oribabor

== Men's team ==
=== Group stage ===
==== Group A ====
Pos	Team	Pld	W	L	MF	MA	MD	GF	GA	GD	PF	PA	PD	Pts	Qualification
1	Nigeria	1	1	0	5	0	+5	10	1	+9	231	160	+71	1	Knockout stage
2	Zambia	1	0	1	0	5	−5	1	10	−9	160	231	−71	0	Knockout stage

Source: BWF
- Nigeria vs Zambia

Nigeria
5
Lugogo Indoor Stadium, Court 1
20 February 2010, 09:00 UTC+3

Zambia
0

			1	2	3
1	(Nigeria) (Zambia)	Ola Fagbemi; Juma Muwowo	22; 20	17; 21	21; 8
2	(Nigeria) (Zambia)	Jinkan Ifraimu; Ngosa Chongo	24; 22	21; 19
3	(Nigeria) (Zambia)	Ibrahim Adamu; Donald Mabo	21; 12	21; 5
4	(Nigeria) (Zambia)	Ola Fagbemi / Jinkan Ifraimu; Ngosa Chongo / Juma Muwowo	21; 12	21; 14
5	(Nigeria) (Zambia)	Ocholi Edicha / Ibrahim Adamu; Donald Mabo / Gibson Phiri	21; 15	21; 12

==== Group B ====
Pos	Team	Pld	W	L	MF	MA	MD	GF	GA	GD	PF	PA	PD	Pts	Qualification
1	Egypt	2	2	0	9	1	+8	18	3	+15	434	212	+222	2	Knockout stage
2	Seychelles	2	1	1	4	6	−2	10	12	−2	384	393	−9	1	Knockout stage
3	Kenya	2	0	2	2	8	−6	4	17	−13	197	410	−213	0	

Source: BWF
- Seychelles vs Egypt

Seychelles
1
Lugogo Indoor Stadium, Court 2
20 February 2010, 09:00 UTC+3

Egypt
4

			1	2	3
1	(Seychelles) (Egypt)	Steve Malcouzane; Abdelrahman Kashkal	20; 22	10; 21
2	(Seychelles) (Egypt)	Georgie Cupidon; Ali Ahmed El-Khateeb	21; 16	18; 21	19; 21
3	(Seychelles) (Egypt)	Kervin Ghislain; Ahmed Salah	8; 21	14; 21
4	(Seychelles) (Egypt)	Georgie Cupidon / Steve Malcouzanne; Ali Ahmed El-Khateeb / Abdelrahman Kashkal	22; 20	21; 19
5	(Seychelles) (Egypt)	Richie Course / Kervin Ghislain; Ahmed Reda / Ahmed Salah	15; 21	16; 21

- Seychelles vs Kenya

Seychelles
3
Lugogo Indoor Stadium, Court 2
20 February 2010, 14:00 UTC+3

Kenya
2

			1	2	3
1	(Seychelles) (Kenya)	Steve Malcouzanne; Patrick Ruto	21; 9	21; 15
2	(Seychelles) (Kenya)	Georgie Cupidon; Fred Gituku	15; 21	14; 21
3	(Seychelles) (Kenya)	Kervin Ghislain; Victor Odera	21; 11	12; 21	12; 21
4	(Seychelles) (Kenya)	Georgie Cupidon / Steve Malcouzanne; Fred Gituku / Patrick Ruto	21; 11	21; 11
5	(Seychelles) (Kenya)	Richie Course / Kervin Ghislain; Peter Muchiri / Victor Odera	21; 15	21; 13

- Egypt vs Kenya

Egypt
5
Lugogo Indoor Stadium, Court 1
21 February 2010, 14:00 UTC+3

Kenya
0

			1	2	3
1	(Egypt) (Kenya)	Abdelrahman Kashkal; Patrick Ruto	21; 14	21; 14
2	(Egypt) (Kenya)	Ali Ahmed El-Khateeb; Victor Odera				w/o
3	(Egypt) (Kenya)	Ahmed Reda; Fred Gituku				w/o
4	(Egypt) (Kenya)	Ali Ahmed El-Khateeb / Abdelrahman Kashkal; Dawn Mistri / Victor Odera				w/o
5	(Egypt) (Kenya)	Ahmed Reda / Ahmed Salah; Fred Gituku / Patrick Ruto				w/o

==== Group C ====
Pos	Team	Pld	W	L	MF	MA	MD	GF	GA	GD	PF	PA	PD	Pts	Qualification
1	Mauritius	2	2	0	9	1	+8	19	2	+17	433	319	+114	2	Knockout stage
2	Uganda (H)	2	1	1	4	6	−2	8	14	−6	391	413	−22	1	Knockout stage
3	Algeria	2	0	2	2	8	−6	5	16	−11	334	426	−92	0	

Source: BWF
(H) Host
- Mauritius vs Algeria

Mauritius
5
Lugogo Indoor Stadium, Court 3
20 February 2010, 09:00 UTC+3

Algeria
0

			1	2	3
1	(Mauritius) (Algeria)	Sahir Edoo; Mohamed Abderrahime Belarbi	21; 17	21; 18
2	(Mauritius) (Algeria)	Saheer Ramrakha; Adel Hamek	21; 19	21; 18
3	(Mauritius) (Algeria)	Stephan Beeharry; Nourine Salim	21; 18	21; 7
4	(Mauritius) (Algeria)	Sahir Edoo / Yoni Louison; Mohamed Abderrahime Belarbi / Adel Hamek	21; 17	21; 8
5	(Mauritius) (Algeria)	Stephan Beeharry / Saheer Ramrakha; Mohamed Idir Mohlous / Nourine Salim	21; 8	21; 14

- Mauritius vs Uganda

Mauritius
4
Lugogo Indoor Stadium, Court 3
20 February 2010, 16:30 UTC+3

Uganda
1

			1	2	3
1	(Mauritius) (Uganda)	Sahir Edoo; Wilson Tukire	21; 17	21; 13
2	(Mauritius) (Uganda)	Yoni Louison; Brian Ssunna	19; 21	21; 19	15; 21
3	(Mauritius) (Uganda)	Saheer Ramrakha; Jimmy Okubi	21; 6	21; 17
4	(Mauritius) (Uganda)	Sahir Edoo / Yoni Louison; Brian Ssunna / Wilson Tukire	21; 19	21; 17
5	(Mauritius) (Uganda)	Stephan Beeharry / Saheer Ramrakha; Rogers Bakaki / Herbert Ebayo	21; 12	21; 13

- Algeria vs Uganda

Algeria
2
Lugogo Indoor Stadium, Court 3
21 February 2010, 14:00 UTC+3

Uganda
3

			1	2	3
1	(Algeria) (Uganda)	Adel Hamek; Wilson Tukire	15; 21	10; 21
2	(Algeria) (Uganda)	Mohamed Abderrahime Belarbi; Brian Ssunna	21; 18	15; 21	15; 21
3	(Algeria) (Uganda)	Nourine Salim; Jimmy Okubi	21; 16	21; 18
4	(Algeria) (Uganda)	Mohamed Abderrahime Belarbi / Adel Hamek; Rogers Bakaki / Herbert Ebayo	21; 17	23; 21
5	(Algeria) (Uganda)	Mohamed Idir Mohlous / Nourine Salim; Brian Ssunna / Wilson Tukire	19; 21	9; 21

==== Group D ====
Pos	Team	Pld	W	L	MF	MA	MD	GF	GA	GD	PF	PA	PD	Pts	Qualification
1	South Africa	2	2	0	8	2	+6	17	4	+13	420	228	+192	2	Knockout stage
2	Ghana	2	1	1	7	3	+4	14	7	+7	385	293	+92	1	Knockout stage
3	Burundi	2	0	2	0	10	−10	0	20	−20	136	420	−284	0	

Source: BWF
- South Africa vs Burundi

South Africa
5
Lugogo Indoor Stadium, Court 1
20 February 2010, 11:30 UTC+3

Burundi
0

			1	2	3
1	(South Africa) (Burundi)	Jacob Maliekal; Eric Niyongabo	21; 9	21; 5
2	(South Africa) (Burundi)	Robert Abrahams; Pascal Niyonkuru	21; 5	21; 6
3	(South Africa) (Burundi)	Roelof Dednam; Clement Gahongore	21; 2	21; 5
4	(South Africa) (Burundi)	Robert Abrahams / Jacob Maliekal; Eric Niyongabo / Pascal Niyonkuru	21; 7	21; 6
5	(South Africa) (Burundi)	Roelof Dednam / Dorian James; Clement Gahongore / Thierry Rutayisire	21; 7	21; 1

- South Africa vs Ghana

South Africa
3
Lugogo Indoor Stadium, Court 2
20 February 2010, 16:30 UTC+3

Ghana
2

			1	2	3
1	(South Africa) (Ghana)	Jacob Maliekal; Solomon Mensah Nyarko	7; 21	16; 21
2	(South Africa) (Ghana)	Robert Abrahams; Michael Sam	21; 11	21; 15
3	(South Africa) (Ghana)	Roelof Dednam; Daniel Sam	23; 21	19; 21	19; 21
4	(South Africa) (Ghana)	Robert Abrahams / Jacob Maliekal; Emmanuel Donkor / Eric Attah Ninky	21; 16	21; 10
5	(South Africa) (Ghana)	Roelof Dednam / Dorian James; Solomon Mensah Nyarko / Daniel Sam	21; 10	21; 8

- Burundi vs Ghana

Burundi
0
Lugogo Indoor Stadium, Court 1
21 February 2010, 16:30 UTC+3

Ghana
5

			1	2	3
1	(Burundi) (Ghana)	Pascal Niyonkuru; Solomon Mensah Nyarko	14; 21	12; 21
2	(Burundi) (Ghana)	Eric Niyongabo; Michael Sam	5; 21	6; 21
3	(Burundi) (Ghana)	Thierry Rutayisire; Daniel Sam	2; 21	7; 21
4	(Burundi) (Ghana)	Pascal Niyonkuru / Eric Niyongabo; Emmanuel Donkor / Eric Attah Ninky	16; 21	3; 21
5	(Burundi) (Ghana)	Clement Gahongore / Thierry Rutayisire; Solomon Mensah Nyarko / Daniel Sam	11; 21	7; 21

=== Knockout stage ===
==== Bracket ====
Quarter-finals
22 February
Nigeria	3
Uganda	0
22 February
Seychelles	2
South Africa	3
22 February
Mauritius	3
Zambia	1
22 February
Ghana	2
Egypt	3

Semi-finals
23 February
Nigeria	3
South Africa	0
23 February
Mauritius	3
Egypt	2

Final
23 February
Nigeria	3
Mauritius	1

==== Quarter-finals ====
- Nigeria vs Uganda

Nigeria
3
Lugogo Indoor Stadium, Court 2
22 February 2010, 11:30 UTC+3

Uganda
0

			1	2	3
1	(Nigeria) (Uganda)	Ola Fagbemi; Wilson Tukire	21; 11	21; 13
2	(Nigeria) (Uganda)	Jinkan Ifraimu; Brian Ssunna	21; 16	21; 16
3	(Nigeria) (Uganda)	Ibrahim Adamu; Jimmy Okubi	21; 15	21; 7
4	(Nigeria) (Uganda)	Ola Fagbemi / Jinkan Ifraimu; Brian Ssunna / Wilson Tukire				not played
5	(Nigeria) (Uganda)	Ibrahim Adamu / Ocholi Edicha; Rogers Bakaki / Herbert Ebayo				not played

- South Africa vs Seychelles

South Africa
3
Lugogo Indoor Stadium, Court 3
22 February 2010, 11:30 UTC+3

Seychelles
2

			1	2	3
1	(South Africa) (Seychelles)	Willem Viljoen; Steve Malcouzanne	21; 23	15; 21
2	(South Africa) (Seychelles)	Robert Abrahams; Georgie Cupidon	17; 21	21; 19	9; 21
3	(South Africa) (Seychelles)	Roelof Dednam; Kervin Ghislain	21; 8	21; 8
4	(South Africa) (Seychelles)	Dorian James / Willem Viljoen; Georgie Cupidon / Steve Malcouzanne	21; 15	21; 10
5	(South Africa) (Seychelles)	Robert Abrahams / Roelof Dednam; Richie Course / Kervin Ghislain	21; 14	15; 21	21; 11

- Zambia vs Mauritius

Zambia
1
Lugogo Indoor Stadium, Court 1
22 February 2010, 14:00 UTC+3

Mauritius
3

			1	2	3
1	(Zambia) (Mauritius)	Juma Muwowo; Sahir Edoo	17; 21	11; 21
2	(Zambia) (Mauritius)	Ngosa Chongo; Saheer Ramrakha	22; 20	21; 18
3	(Zambia) (Mauritius)	Gibson Phiri; Stephan Beeharry	16; 21	9; 21
4	(Zambia) (Mauritius)	Ngosa Chongo / Juma Muwowo; Sahir Edoo / Yoni Louison	11; 21	14; 21
5	(Zambia) (Mauritius)	Donald Mabo / Gibson Phiri; Stephan Beeharry / Saheer Ramrakha				not played

- Ghana vs Egypt

Ghana
2
Lugogo Indoor Stadium, Court 2
22 February 2010, 14:00 UTC+3

Egypt
3

			1	2	3
1	(Ghana) (Egypt)	Solomon Mensah Nyarko; Abdelrahman Kashkal	21; 17	21; 17
2	(Ghana) (Egypt)	Michael Sam; Ali Ahmed El-Khateeb	20; 22	9; 21
3	(Ghana) (Egypt)	Daniel Sam; Ahmed Salah	21; 12	19; 21	21; 15
4	(Ghana) (Egypt)	Emmanuel Donkor / Eric Attah Ninky; Ali Ahmed El-Khateeb / Abdelrahman Kashkal				w/o
5	(Ghana) (Egypt)	Solomon Mensah Nyarko / Daniel Sam; Ahmed Reda / Ahmed Salah				w/o

==== Semi-finals ====
- Nigeria vs South Africa

Nigeria
3
Lugogo Indoor Stadium, Court 1
23 February 2010, 10:00 UTC+3

South Africa
0

			1	2	3
1	(Nigeria) (South Africa)	Ola Fagbemi; Willem Viljoen	23; 21	22; 20
2	(Nigeria) (South Africa)	Jinkan Ifraimu; Robert Abrahams	21; 16	19; 21	21; 11
3	(Nigeria) (South Africa)	Ibrahim Adamu; Roelof Dednam	21; 17	15; 21	21; 16
4	(Nigeria) (South Africa)	Ola Fagbemi / Jinkan Ifraimu; Dorian James / Willem Viljoen				not played
5	(Nigeria) (South Africa)	Ibrahim Adamu / Ocholi Edicha; Robert Abrahams / Roelof Dednam				not played

- Mauritius vs Egypt

Mauritius
3
Lugogo Indoor Stadium, Court 2
23 February 2010, 10:00 UTC+3

Egypt
2

			1	2	3
1	(Mauritius) (Egypt)	Sahir Edoo; Abdelrahman Kashkal	11; 21	21; 17	21; 15
2	(Mauritius) (Egypt)	Saheer Ramrakha; Ali Ahmed El-Khateeb	14; 21	19; 21
3	(Mauritius) (Egypt)	Stephan Beeharry; Ahmed Reda	21; 18	21; 11
4	(Mauritius) (Egypt)	Sahir Edoo / Yoni Louison; Ali Ahmed El-Khateeb / Abdelrahman Kashkal	10; 21	21; 18	18; 21
5	(Mauritius) (Egypt)	Stephan Beeharry / Saheer Ramrakha; Ahmed Reda / Ahmed Salah	21; 13	17; 21	21; 14

==== Final ====
- Nigeria vs Mauritius

Nigeria
3
Lugogo Indoor Stadium, Court 1
23 February 2010, 15:00 UTC+3

Mauritius
1

			1	2	3
1	(Nigeria) (Mauritius)	Ola Fagbemi; Sahir Edoo	16; 21	15; 21
2	(Nigeria) (Mauritius)	Jinkan Ifraimu; Saheer Ramrakha	21; 12	21; 11
3	(Nigeria) (Mauritius)	Ibrahim Adamu; Stephan Beeharry	21; 9	21; 12
4	(Nigeria) (Mauritius)	Ola Fagbemi / Jinkan Ifraimu; Sahir Edoo / Yoni Louison	23; 21	21; 11
5	(Nigeria) (Mauritius)	Ibrahim Adamu / Ocholi Edicha; Stephan Beeharry / Saheer Ramrakha				not played

== Women's team ==
=== Group stage ===
==== Group A ====
Pos	Team	Pld	W	L	MF	MA	MD	GF	GA	GD	PF	PA	PD	Pts	Qualification
1	South Africa	1	1	0	5	0	+5	10	0	+10	210	37	+173	1	Knockout stage
2	Burundi	1	0	1	0	5	−5	0	10	−10	37	210	−173	0	Knockout stage

Source: BWF
- South Africa vs Burundi

South Africa
5
Lugogo Indoor Stadium, Court 2
20 February 2010, 11:30 UTC+3

Burundi
0

			1	2	3
1	(South Africa) (Burundi)	Stacey Doubell; Jeanine Nkurunziza	21; 5	21; 4
2	(South Africa) (Burundi)	Kerry-Lee Harrington; Muriel Kezakimana	21; 3	21; 9
3	(South Africa) (Burundi)	Jade Morgan; Aline Nininahazwe	21; 1	21; 4
4	(South Africa) (Burundi)	Stacey Doubell / Kerry-Lee Harrington; Jeanine Nkurunziza / Muriel Kezakimana	21; 6	21; 3
5	(South Africa) (Burundi)	Michelle Claire Edwards / Jade Morgan; Feneste Ndihokubwayo / Aline Nininahazwe	21; 2	21; 0

==== Group B ====
Pos	Team	Pld	W	L	MF	MA	MD	GF	GA	GD	PF	PA	PD	Pts	Qualification
1	Mauritius	2	2	0	10	0	+10	20	0	+20	420	178	+242	2	Knockout stage
2	Kenya	2	1	1	3	7	−4	7	16	−9	342	451	−109	1	Knockout stage
3	Ghana	2	0	2	2	8	−6	6	17	−11	325	458	−133	0	

Source: BWF
- Mauritius vs Kenya

Mauritius
5
Lugogo Indoor Stadium, Court 3
20 February 2010, 11:30 UTC+3

Kenya
0

			1	2	3
1	(Mauritius) (Kenya)	Karen Foo Kune; Sheila Gakii	21; 8	21; 12
2	(Mauritius) (Kenya)	Marlyse Marquer; Mercy Joseph	21; 15	21; 8
3	(Mauritius) (Kenya)	Amrita Sawaram; Anita Alube	21; 8	21; 10
4	(Mauritius) (Kenya)	Karen Foo Kune / Kate Foo Kune; Jemima Mageni / Lavina Martins	21; 6	21; 11
5	(Mauritius) (Kenya)	Marlyse Marquer / Amrita Sawaram; Anita Alube / Mercy Joseph	21; 12	21; 4

- Mauritius vs Ghana

Mauritius
5
Lugogo Indoor Stadium, Court 2
20 February 2010, 16:30 UTC+3

Ghana
0

			1	2	3
1	(Mauritius) (Ghana)	Karen Foo Kune; Theresa Tetteh	21; 9	21; 11
2	(Mauritius) (Ghana)	Marlyse Marquer; Evelyn Botwe	21; 6	21; 16
3	(Mauritius) (Ghana)	Amrita Sawaram; Linda Osei Hammond	21; 9	21; 4
4	(Mauritius) (Ghana)	Karen Foo Kune / Kate Foo Kune; Evelyn Botwe / Theresa Tetteh	21; 8	21; 5
5	(Mauritius) (Ghana)	Marlyse Marquer / Amrita Sawaram; Stella Amasah / Linda Osei Hammond	21; 7	21; 9

- Kenya vs Ghana

Kenya
3
Lugogo Indoor Stadium, Court 2
21 February 2010, 14:00 UTC+3

Ghana
2

			1	2	3
1	(Kenya) (Ghana)	Mercy Joseph; Theresa Tetteh	20; 22	8; 21
2	(Kenya) (Ghana)	Anita Alube; Evelyn Botwe	18; 21	21; 16	21; 13
3	(Kenya) (Ghana)	Lavina Martins; Linda Osei Hammond	21; 11	11; 21	21; 16
4	(Kenya) (Ghana)	Jemima Mageni / Lavina Martins; Evelyn Botwe / Theresa Tetteh	20; 22	21; 18	22; 24
5	(Kenya) (Ghana)	Anita Alube / Mercy Joseph; Stella Amasah / Linda Osei Hammond	21; 15	23; 21

==== Group C ====
Pos	Team	Pld	W	L	MF	MA	MD	GF	GA	GD	PF	PA	PD	Pts	Qualification
1	Seychelles	1	1	0	5	0	+5	10	0	+10	212	141	+71	1	Knockout stage
2	Uganda (H)	1	0	1	0	5	−5	0	10	−10	141	212	−71	0	Knockout stage

Source: BWF
(H) Host
- Seychelles vs Uganda

Seychelles
5
Lugogo Indoor Stadium, Court 3
20 February 2010, 14:00 UTC+3

Uganda
0

			1	2	3
1	(Seychelles) (Uganda)	Juliette Ah-Wan; Bridget Shamim Bangi	21; 15	21; 15
2	(Seychelles) (Uganda)	Catherina Paulin; Margaret Nankabirwa	21; 19	21; 19
3	(Seychelles) (Uganda)	Allisen Camille; Daisy Nakalyango	23; 21	21; 18
4	(Seychelles) (Uganda)	Juliette Ah-Wan / Allisen Camille; Bridget Shamim Bangi / Margaret Nankabirwa	21; 9	21; 8
5	(Seychelles) (Uganda)	Jessy Mancienne / Catherina Paulin; Rose Nakalya / Norah Nassimbwa	21; 10	21; 7

==== Group D ====
Pos	Team	Pld	W	L	MF	MA	MD	GF	GA	GD	PF	PA	PD	Pts	Qualification
1	Nigeria	1	1	0	5	0	+5	10	2	+8	251	177	+74	1	Knockout stage
2	Egypt	1	0	1	0	5	−5	2	10	−8	177	251	−74	0	Knockout stage

Source: BWF
- Nigeria vs Egypt

Nigeria
4
Lugogo Indoor Stadium, Court 1
20 February 2010, 14:00 UTC+3

Egypt
1

			1	2	3
1	(Nigeria) (Egypt)	Susan Ideh; Hadia Hosny	18; 21	21; 8	21; 6
2	(Nigeria) (Egypt)	Maria Braimoh; Noran Hassan Elbanna	21; 12	21; 18
3	(Nigeria) (Egypt)	Grace Gabriel; Alaa Youssef	21; 10	21; 12
4	(Nigeria) (Egypt)	Maria Braimoh / Susan Ideh; Hadia Hosny / Dina Nagy	21; 18	23; 25	21; 17
5	(Nigeria) (Egypt)	Ketu Ilofuan / Imhade Oribabor; Noran Hassan Elbanna / Alaa Youssef	21; 15	21; 15

=== Knockout stage ===
==== Bracket ====
Quarter-finals
22 February
South Africa	3
Uganda	0
22 February
Kenya	0
Nigeria	3
22 February
Egypt	3
Mauritius	0
22 February
Seychelles
Burundi	w/o

Semi-finals
22 February
South Africa	3
Nigeria	1
22 February
Egypt	3
Burundi	0

Final
23 February
South Africa	3
Egypt	1

==== Quarter-finals ====
- Burundi vs Seychelles

Burundi
-
Lugogo Indoor Stadium, Court 1
22 February 2010, 09:00 UTC+3

Seychelles
Withdrew

			1	2	3
1	(Burundi) (Seychelles)	Muriel Kezakimana; Allisen Camille				w/o
2	(Burundi) (Seychelles)	Aline Nininahazwe; Cynthia Course				w/o
3	(Burundi) (Seychelles)	Feneste Ndihokubwayo; Jessy Mancienne				w/o
4	(Burundi) (Seychelles)	Muriel Kezakimana / Feneste Ndihokubwayo; Allisen Camille / Cynthia Course				w/o
5	(Burundi) (Seychelles)	Aline Nininahazwe / Jeanine Nkurunziza; Jessy Mancienne / Catherina Paulin				w/o

- Nigeria vs Kenya

Nigeria
3
Lugogo Indoor Stadium, Court 2
22 February 2010, 09:00 UTC+3

Kenya
0

			1	2	3
1	(Nigeria) (Kenya)	Susan Ideh; Mercy Joseph	21; 8	21; 13
2	(Nigeria) (Kenya)	Maria Braimoh; Anita Alube	21; 13	21; 12
3	(Nigeria) (Kenya)	Grace Gabriel; Lavina Martins	21; 15	21; 11
4	(Nigeria) (Kenya)	Ketu Ilofuan / Imhade Oribabor; Anita Alube / Mercy Joseph				not played
5	(Nigeria) (Kenya)	Maria Braimoh / Susan Ideh; Jemima Mageni / Lavina Martins				not played

- South Africa vs Uganda

South Africa
3
Lugogo Indoor Stadium, Court 3
22 February 2010, 09:00 UTC+3

Uganda
0

			1	2	3
1	(South Africa) (Uganda)	Stacey Doubell; Bridget Shamim Bangi	11; 21	21; 11	21; 9
2	(South Africa) (Uganda)	Kerry-Lee Harrington; Margaret Nankabirwa	21; 12	21; 23	21; 13
3	(South Africa) (Uganda)	Jade Morgan; Daisy Nakalyango	21; 14	21; 7
4	(South Africa) (Uganda)	Stacey Doubell / Kerry-Lee Harrington; Rose Nakalya / Norah Nassimbwa				not played
5	(South Africa) (Uganda)	Michelle Claire Edwards / Jade Morgan; Bridget Shamim Bangi / Margaret Nankabirwa				not played

- Egypt vs Mauritius

Egypt
3
Lugogo Indoor Stadium, Court 1
22 February 2010, 11:30 UTC+3

Mauritius
0

			1	2	3
1	(Egypt) (Mauritius)	Hadia Hosny; Karen Foo Kune	21; 15	21; 10
2	(Egypt) (Mauritius)	Dina Nagy; Marlyse Marquer	21; 10	21; 11
3	(Egypt) (Mauritius)	Noran Hassan Elbanna; Amrita Sawaram	21; 12	21; 13
4	(Egypt) (Mauritius)	Hadia Hosny / Dina Nagy; Karen Foo Kune / Kate Foo Kune				not played
5	(Egypt) (Mauritius)	Noran Hassan Elbanna / Alaa Youssef; Marlyse Marquer / Amrita Sawaram				not played

==== Semi-finals ====
- South Africa vs Nigeria

South Africa
3
Lugogo Indoor Stadium, Court 3
22 February 2010, 14:00 UTC+3

Nigeria
1

			1	2	3
1	(South Africa) (Nigeria)	Stacey Doubell; Susan Ideh	16; 21	16; 21
2	(South Africa) (Nigeria)	Kerry-Lee Harrington; Maria Braimoh	21; 17	21; 14
3	(South Africa) (Nigeria)	Michelle Claire Edwards; Grace Gabriel	21; 16	21; 11
4	(South Africa) (Nigeria)	Stacey Doubell / Kerry-Lee Harrington; Ketu Ilofuan / Imhade Oribabor	23; 21	21; 9
5	(South Africa) (Nigeria)	Michelle Claire Edwards / Jade Morgan; Maria Braimoh / Susan Ideh				not played

- Burundi vs Egypt

Burundi
0
Lugogo Indoor Stadium, Court 1
22 February 2010, 16:30 UTC+3

Egypt
3

			1	2	3
1	(Burundi) (Egypt)	Muriel Kezakimana; Hadia Hosny	3; 21	5; 21
2	(Burundi) (Egypt)	Aline Nininahazwe; Noran Hassan Elbanna	12; 21	2; 21
3	(Burundi) (Egypt)	Feneste Ndihokubwayo; Alaa Youssef	1; 21	2; 21
4	(Burundi) (Egypt)	Muriel Kezakimana / Feneste Ndihokubwayo; Hadia Hosny / Dina Nagy				not played
5	(Burundi) (Egypt)	Aline Nininahazwe / Jeanine Nkurunziza; Noran Hassan Elbanna / Alaa Youssef				not played

==== Final ====
- South Africa vs Egypt

South Africa
3
Lugogo Indoor Stadium, Court 2
23 February 2010, 15:00 UTC+3

Egypt
1

			1	2	3
1	(South Africa) (Egypt)	Stacey Doubell; Hadia Hosny	20; 22	21; 15	15; 21
2	(South Africa) (Egypt)	Kerry-Lee Harrington; Noran Hassan Elbanna	21; 12	21; 14
3	(South Africa) (Egypt)	Michelle Claire Edwards; Alaa Youssef	21; 11	21; 10
4	(South Africa) (Egypt)	Michelle Claire Edwards / Jade Morgan; Hadia Hosny / Dina Nagy	21; 15	21; 15
5	(South Africa) (Egypt)	Stacey Doubell / Kerry-Lee Harrington; Alaa Youssef / Noran Hassan Elbanna				not played
