= 2012 BWF World Junior Championships – Boys singles =

Badminton championships

The Boys Singles tournament of the 2012 BWF World Junior Championships was held from October 30 until November 3. Zulfadli Zulkiffli from Malaysia is the last edition winner.

Japanese Kento Momota clinched the title after beating Chinese Xue Song in the thrilling final match by 21–17, 19–21, 21–19.

== Seeded ==
1. (Denmark) Viktor Axelsen (quarter-final)
2. (Japan) Kento Momota (champion)
3. (Malaysia) Soong Joo Ven (third round)
4. (Thailand) Khosit Phetpradab (second round)
5. (Thailand) Thammasin Sitthikom (second round)
6. (Malaysia) Soo Teck Zhi (quarter-final)
7. (Hong Kong) Ng Ka Long (fourth round)
8. (India) C. Rohit Yadav (fourth round)
9. (Austria) Mathias Almer (third round)
10. (Indonesia) Panji Akbar Sudrajat (quarter-final)
11. (Czech Republic) Adam Mendrek (fourth round)
12. (Republic of Ireland) Jonathan Dolan (fourth round)
13. (Finland) Kalle Koljonen (second round)
14. (Indonesia) Thomi Azizan Mahbub (third round)
15. (Chinese Taipei) Wang Tzu-wei (third round)
16. (China) Xue Song (final)

== Draw ==
=== Finals ===
Quarterfinals
1	(Denmark) Viktor Axelsen	19	21	17
9/16	(China) Xue Song	21	13	21
(Chinese Taipei) Hsu Jui-ting	21	21
9/16	(Indonesia) Panji Akbar Sudrajat	17	13
(Malaysia) Chong Yee Han	21	11
(South Korea) Heo Kwang-hee	23	21
5/8	(Malaysia) Soo Teck Zhi	12	11
2	(Japan) Kento Momota	21	21

Semifinals
9/16	(China) Xue Song	21	21
(Chinese Taipei) Hsu Jui-ting	12	7
(South Korea) Heo Kwang-hee	17	8
2	(Japan) Kento Momota	21	21

Final
9/16	(China) Xue Song	17	21	19
2	(Japan) Kento Momota	21	19	21

=== Top half ===
==== Section 1 ====
First round
(Uzbekistan) B Appakhodjaev	3	7
(England) R Walker	21	21
(Malaysia) Tan KM	21	21
(Ukraine) A Zinukhov	14	10
(Turkey) E Sesalan	17	20
(France) P Cajot	21	21
(Sri Lanka) V Kukulage	11	13
(Vietnam) Pham HN	21	21

Second round
1	(Denmark) V Axelsen	21	21
(Hong Kong) Tang CM	11	17
(England) R Walker	19	19
(Malaysia) Tan KM	21	21
9/16	(Republic of Ireland) J Dolan	21	21
(Philippines) R Pedrosa	8	12
(France) P Cajot	21	23
(Vietnam) Pham HN	13	21

Third round
1	(Denmark) V Axelsen	21	21
(Malaysia) Tan KM	12	15
9/16	(Republic of Ireland) J Dolan	21	21
(France) P Cajot	16	12

Fourth round
1	(Denmark) V Axelsen	21	21
9/16	(Republic of Ireland) J Dolan	10	11

==== Section 2 ====
First round
(South Africa) C Coetzer	6	9
(Canada) A D'Souza	21	21
(Japan) K Nishimoto	19	20
(Indonesia) F Hadmadi	21	22
(Finland) J Korhonen	21	21
(Bulgaria) D Delchev	14	13
(Chinese Taipei) Hung C-c	18	11
(South Korea) Jung J-w	21	21
(United States) J Kuo	21	17	10
(Thailand) A Namkul	19	21	21

Second round
5/8	(India) R Yadav	14	21	21
(Australia) D Guda	21	18	8
(Canada) A D'Souza	12	14
(Indonesia) F Hadmadi	21	21
9/16	(China) Xue S	21	21
(Finland) J Korhonen	6	13
(South Korea) Jung J-w	21	21
(Thailand) A Namkul	16	12

Third round
5/8	(India) R Yadav	21	21
(Indonesia) F Hadmadi	11	15
9/16	(China) Xue S	21	21
(South Korea) Jung J-w	8	13

Fourth round
5/8	(India) R Yadav	10	12
9/16	(China) Xue S	21	21

==== Section 3 ====
First round
(South Africa) K Jacobs	12	14
(Bulgaria) S Garev	21	21
(Turkey) K Avsar	11	17
(Chinese Taipei) Hsu J-t	21	21
(Russia) S Sirant	14	21	10
(England) A Lane	21	15	21
(Belgium) S van den Broeck	15	17
(Vietnam) Do TD	21	21

Second round
3/4	(Malaysia) Soong JV	21	21
(Canada) F Deblois-Beaucage	9	12
(Bulgaria) S Garev	18	11
(Chinese Taipei) Hsu J-t	21	21
9/16	(Czech Republic) A Mendrek	21	21	22
(Netherlands) V de Vries	13	23	20
(England) A Lane	14	21	21
(Vietnam) Do TD	21	14	12

Third round
3/4	(Malaysia) Soong JV	15	10
(Chinese Taipei) Hsu J-t	21	21
9/16	(Czech Republic) A Mendrek	21	21
(England) A Lane	19	16

Fourth round
(Chinese Taipei) Hsu J-t	21	21
9/16	(Czech Republic) A Mendrek	10	14

==== Section 4 ====
First round
(Singapore) S Lee	14	19
(India) A Joshi	21	21
(Austria) D Stipsits	21	21
(Sri Lanka) B Goonathileka	19	19
(South Korea) Seo S-j	21	14	24
(Finland) I Heino	14	21	22
(Germany) F Roth	21	21
(Philippines) J Monterubio	16	19
(Hong Kong) Chang TC	21	21
(Sweden) J Forsberg	7	18

Second round
5/8	(Thailand) T Sitthikom	19	16
(Japan) A Koga	21	21
(India) A Joshi	21	21
(Austria) D Stipsits	16	16
9/16	(Indonesia) P Sudrajat	23	21
(South Korea) Seo S-j	21	11
(Germany) F Roth	19	13
(Hong Kong) Chang TC	21	21

Third round
(Japan) A Koga	21	21
(India) A Joshi	15	11
9/16	(Indonesia) P Sudrajat	21	21
(Hong Kong) Chang TC	15	16

Fourth round
(Japan) A Koga	21	19	19
9/16	(Indonesia) P Sudrajat	12	21	21

=== Bottom half ===
==== Section 5 ====
First round
(Japan) Y Kobayashi	21	21
(Bulgaria) V Shishkov	11	14
(Canada) N Osborne	8	7
(Chinese Taipei) Lu C-h	21	21
(Malaysia) Chong YH	21	21
(Australia) S Serasinghe	13	10
(Russia) A Dolotov	15	21	15
(Netherlands) J Teeuwen	21	19	21
(Republic of Ireland) J Magee	21	21
(United States) A Shekhtman	15	18

Second round
(Japan) Y Kobayashi	21	21
(Chinese Taipei) Lu C-h	16	18
(Malaysia) Chong YH	21	21
9/16	(Finland) K Koljonen	11	7
(Netherlands) J Teeuwen	21	21
(Republic of Ireland) J Magee	17	15
(Singapore) R Ng	14	15
5/8	(Hong Kong) Ng KL	21	21

Third round
(Japan) Y Kobayashi	11	21	12
(Malaysia) Chong YH	21	17	21
(Netherlands) J Teeuwen	7	16
5/8	(Hong Kong) Ng KL	21	21

Fourth round
(Malaysia) Chong YH	21	21
5/8	(Hong Kong) Ng KL	15	18

==== Section 6 ====
First round
(Philippines) M Alcala	13	21	21
(Turkey) S Zorlu	21	13	19
(India) P Joshi	21	21
(Peru) D Young	11	12
(Uzbekistan) A Savatyugin	7	8
(Germany) L Schaenzler	21	21
(Ukraine) A Truskalov	19	22
(Czech Republic) M Svetnicka	21	24
(China) Zhou YJ	19	12
(Denmark) R Noes	21	21

Second round
(Philippines) M Alcala	16	8
(India) P Joshi	21	21
(Germany) L Schaenzler	9	9
9/16	(Indonesia) T Mahbub	21	21
(Czech Republic) M Svetnicka	10	16
(Denmark) R Noes	21	21
(South Korea) Heo K-h	16	21	21
3/4	(Thailand) K Phetpradab	21	17	19

Third round
(India) P Joshi	23	14	22
9/16	(Indonesia) T Mahbub	21	21	20
(Denmark) R Noes	12	18
(South Korea) Heo K-h	21	21

Fourth round
(India) P Joshi	22	16	16
(South Korea) Heo K-h	20	21	21

==== Section 7 ====
First round
(India) H Dani	21	21
(South Africa) A Malan	12	14
(Czech Republic) J Janacek	21	21
(Uzbekistan) A Bakhshullaev	13	13
(Australia) A Selladurai	21	16	19
(United States) W Cheung	14	21	21
(Sweden) C Nilsson	21	15	21
(England) T Wolfenden	8	21	19
(France) A Lodiot	12	5
(Netherlands) M Caljouw	21	21

Second round
(India) H Dani	19	21	21
(Czech Republic) J Janacek	21	18	11
(United States) W Cheung	14	14
9/16	(Austria) M Almer	21	21
(Sweden) C Nilsson	21	20	14
(Netherlands) M Caljouw	19	22	21
(Ukraine) M Kosovan	8	9
5/8	(Malaysia) Soo TZ	21	21

Third round
(India) H Dani	21	21
9/16	(Austria) M Almer	19	13
(Netherlands) M Caljouw	21	13	10
5/8	(Malaysia) Soo TZ	10	21	21

Fourth round
(India) H Dani	13	21	15
5/8	(Malaysia) Soo TZ	21	19	21

==== Section 8 ====
First round
(China) Guo K	21	21
(Sri Lanka) P Hettiarachchi	5	8
(Belgium) M Put	14	10
(South Korea) Jeon H-j	21	21
(Russia) K Boyarskiy	15	20
(Indonesia) A Ramadhan	21	22
(Singapore) G Ong	21	21
(Germany) J Pistorius	7	18

Second round
(China) Guo K	21	21
(South Korea) Jeon H-j	18	18
(Thailand) P Thongnuam	21	15	16
9/16	(Chinese Taipei) Wang T-w	16	21	21
(Indonesia) A Ramadhan	21	21
(Singapore) G Ong	12	13
(Vietnam) Pham CC	20	9
2	(Japan) K Momota	22	21

Third round
(China) Guo K	21	21
9/16	(Chinese Taipei) Wang T-w	18	16
(Indonesia) A Ramadhan	16	10
2	(Japan) K Momota	21	21

Fourth round
(China) Guo K	20	17
2	(Japan) K Momota	22	21
