= 2016 Africa Continental Team Badminton Championships =

Tournament details
- Dates: 15–21 February 2016
- Location: Beau-Bassin Rose-Hill, Mauritius

The 2016 Africa Continental Team Badminton Championships were held in Beau-Bassin Rose-Hill, Mauritius, between 15–21 February and were organised by Badminton Confederation of Africa. South Africa was the defending champion. This tournament serves as qualification stage for African countries for the 2016 Thomas & Uber Cup.

== Medalists ==
- Men's Team

Medal	Team	Players
Gold	South Africa	Cameron Coetzer, Andries Malan, Jacob Maliekal, Prakash Vijayanath, Willem Viljoen
Silver	Mauritius	Deeneshing Baboolall, Jean Bernard Bongout, Sahir Abdool Edoo, Aatish Lubah, Christopher Paul, Georges Julien Paul
Bronze	Ghana	Abraham Ayittey, Michael Opoku Baah, Daniel Sam, Michael Sam, Emmanuel Yaw Donkor
Bronze	Algeria	Mohamed Abderrahime Belarbi, Adel Hamek, Koceila Mammeri, Adel Meddah, Youcef Sabri Medel

- Women's Team

Medal	Team	Players
Gold	Mauritius	Shama Aboobakar, Nicki Chan-Lam, Kate Foo Kune, Shania Leung, Yeldy Marie Louison, Sendila Mourat
Silver	Egypt	Nadine Ashraf, Menna Eltanany, Doha Hany, Hadia Hosny
Bronze	Ghana	Stella Koteikai Amasah, Diana Archer, Grace Annabel Atipaka, Gifty Mensah
Bronze	Uganda	Bridget Shamim Bangi, Gloria Najjuka, Daisy Nakalyango, Aisha Nakiyemba

== Men's team ==
=== Group stage ===
==== Group A ====
Pos	Team	Pld	W	L	MF	MA	MD	GF	GA	GD	PF	PA	PD	Pts	Qualification
1	South Africa	3	3	0	14	1	+13	29	6	+23	704	495	+209	3	Knockout stage
2	Mauritius	3	2	1	8	7	+1	19	14	+5	607	532	+75	2	Knockout stage
3	Réunion	3	1	2	8	7	+1	18	17	+1	660	600	+60	1	
4	Zimbabwe	3	0	3	0	15	−15	1	30	−29	309	653	−344	0	

Source: TS
- South Africa vs. Reunion

South Africa
4
National Badminton Centre, Court 1
16 February 2016 17:00

Réunion
1

			1	2	3
1	(South Africa) (Réunion)	Jacob Maliekal; Loic Bertil	21; 12	21; 11
2	(South Africa) (Réunion)	Prakash Vijayanath; Arnaud Génin	21; 14	15; 21	17; 21
3	(South Africa) (Réunion)	Cameron Coetzer; Didier Nourry	19; 21	22; 20	21; 17
4	(South Africa) (Réunion)	Andries Malan / Willem Viljoen; Terry Sebastien Amedee / Loic Bertil	21; 16	21; 11
5	(South Africa) (Réunion)	Cameron Coetzer / Prakash Vijayanath; Arnaud Génin / Didier Nourry	26; 24	13; 21	21; 16

- Mauritius vs. Zimbabwe

Mauritius
5
National Badminton Centre, Court 2
16 February 2016 17:00

Zimbabwe
0

			1	2	3
1	(Mauritius) (Zimbabwe)	Georges Paul; Paul Kopolo	21; 10	21; 12
2	(Mauritius) (Zimbabwe)	Aatish Lubah; Ashel Dziva	21; 8	21; 6
3	(Mauritius) (Zimbabwe)	Christopher Paul; Shayne Fernandes	21; 14	21; 10
4	(Mauritius) (Zimbabwe)	Aatish Lubah / Georges Paul; Shayne Fernandes / Paul Kopolo	21; 6	21; 14
5	(Mauritius) (Zimbabwe)	Denneshsing Baboolall / Christopher Paul; Ashel Dziva / Tonderai Bradley Kadeya	21; 8	21; 7

- Mauritius vs. Reunion

Mauritius
3
National Badminton Centre, Court 5
17 February 2016 10:00

Réunion
2

			1	2	3
1	(Mauritius) (Réunion)	Georges Paul; Loic Bertil	21; 17	21; 18
2	(Mauritius) (Réunion)	Aatish Lubah; Arnaud Génin	20; 22	13; 21
3	(Mauritius) (Réunion)	Christopher Paul; Didier Nourry	21; 17	21; 18
4	(Mauritius) (Réunion)	Aatish Lubah / Georges Paul; Terry Sebastien Amedee / Loic Bertil	21; 10	21; 18
5	(Mauritius) (Réunion)	Denneshsing Baboolall / Christopher Paul; Arnaud Génin / Didier Nourry	21; 18	17; 21	20; 22

- South Africa vs. Zimbabwe

South Africa
5
National Badminton Centre, Court 7
17 February 2016 10:00

Zimbabwe
0

			1	2	3
1	(South Africa) (Zimbabwe)	Jacob Maliekal; Paul Kopolo	21; 7	21; 8
2	(South Africa) (Zimbabwe)	Prakash Vijayanath; Ashel Dziva	21; 10	21; 11
3	(South Africa) (Zimbabwe)	Cameron Coetzer; Tonderai Bradley Kadeya	21; 11	21; 10
4	(South Africa) (Zimbabwe)	Andries Malan / Willem Viljoen; Shayne Fernandes / Paul Kopolo	21; 6	21; 12
5	(South Africa) (Zimbabwe)	Cameron Coetzer / Jacob Maliekal; Ashel Dziva / Tonderai Bradley Kadeya	21; 10	21; 5

- South Africa vs. Mauritius

South Africa
5
National Badminton Centre, Court 5
17 February 2016 17:00

Mauritius
0

			1	2	3
1	(South Africa) (Mauritius)	Jacob Maliekal; Georges Paul	21; 14	21; 9
2	(South Africa) (Mauritius)	Prakash Vijayanath; Aatish Lubah	21; 16	8; 21	21; 18
3	(South Africa) (Mauritius)	Cameron Coetzer; Denneshsing Baboolall	17; 21	21; 13	21; 17
4	(South Africa) (Mauritius)	Andries Malan / Willem Viljoen; Aatish Lubah / Georges Paul	21; 8	21; 11
5	(South Africa) (Mauritius)	Cameron Coetzer / Jacob Maliekal; Denneshsing Baboolall / Christopher Paul	21; 17	21; 15

- Zimbabwe vs. Reunion

Zimbabwe
0
National Badminton Centre, Court 7
17 February 2016 17:00

Réunion
5

			1	2	3
1	(Zimbabwe) (Réunion)	Paul Kopolo; Arnaud Génin	11; 21	12; 21
2	(Zimbabwe) (Réunion)	Ashel Dziva; Terry Sebastien Amedee	10; 21	13; 21
3	(Zimbabwe) (Réunion)	Tonderai Bradley Kadeya; Vincent Magoni	6; 21	7; 21
4	(Zimbabwe) (Réunion)	Shayne Fernandes / Paul Kopolo; Terry Sebastien Amedee / Didier Nourry	13; 21	25; 23	9; 21
5	(Zimbabwe) (Réunion)	Ashel Dziva / Tonderai Bradley Kadeya; Loic Bertil / Bertrand Lallemand	12; 21	6; 21

==== Group B ====
Pos	Team	Pld	W	L	MF	MA	MD	GF	GA	GD	PF	PA	PD	Pts	Qualification
1	Algeria	2	2	0	8	2	+6	15	5	+10	371	275	+96	2	Knockout stage
2	Ghana	2	1	1	6	4	+2	14	9	+5	421	358	+63	1	Knockout stage
3	Uganda	2	0	2	1	9	−8	3	18	−15	243	402	−159	0	

Source: TS
- Algeria vs. Ghana

Algeria
3
National Badminton Centre, Court 7
16 February 2016 17:00

Ghana
2

			1	2	3
1	(Algeria) (Ghana)	Adel Hamek; Daniel Sam	19; 21	14; 21
2	(Algeria) (Ghana)	Youcef Sabri Medel; Michael Opoku Baah	21; 15	18; 21	21; 16
3	(Algeria) (Ghana)	Mohamed Abderrahime Belarbi; Emmanuel Donkor	10; 21	14; 21
4	(Algeria) (Ghana)	Mohamed Abderrahime Belarbi / Adel Hamek; Daniel Sam / Emmanuel Donkor	21; 14	21; 19
5	(Algeria) (Ghana)	Koceila Mammeri / Youcef Sabri Medel; Abraham Ayittey / Michael Opoku Baah	21; 13	21; 7

- Uganda vs. Ghana

Uganda
1
National Badminton Centre, Court 4
17 February 2016 10:00

Ghana
4

			1	2	3
1	(Uganda) (Ghana)	Edwin Ekiring; Daniel Sam	15; 21	21; 15	21; 11
2	(Uganda) (Ghana)	Davies Senono; Emmanuel Donkor	4; 21	13; 21
3	(Uganda) (Ghana)	Daniel Mihigo; Abraham Ayittey	9; 21	21; 17	15; 21
4	(Uganda) (Ghana)	Herbert Ebayo / Edwin Ekiring; Daniel Sam / Emmanuel Donkor	8; 21	17; 21
5	(Uganda) (Ghana)	Daniel Mihigo / Davies Senono; Abraham Ayittey / Michael Opoku Baah	7; 21	6; 21

- Algeria vs. Uganda

Algeria
5
National Badminton Centre, Court 8
17 February 2016 17:00

Uganda
0

			1	2	3
1	(Algeria) (Uganda)	Adel Hamek; Herbert Ebayo	21; 12	21; 13
2	(Algeria) (Uganda)	Youcef Sabri Medel; Davies Senono	21; 12	21; 14
3	(Algeria) (Uganda)	Mohamed Abderrahime Belarbi; Daniel Mihigo	21; 12	21; 10
4	(Algeria) (Uganda)	Mohamed Abderrahime Belarbi / Adel Hamek; Herbert Ebayo / Edwin Ekiring	2; 0			retired
5	(Algeria) (Uganda)	Koceila Mammeri / Youcef Sabri Medel; Daniel Mihigo / Davies Senono	21; 7	21; 6

=== Knockout stage ===
Semi-finals
18 February
South Africa	3
Ghana	1
18 February
Mauritius	3
Algeria	0

Final
19 February
South Africa	3
Mauritius	1

==== Semifinals ====
- South Africa vs. Ghana

South Africa
3
National Badminton Centre, Court 2
18 February 2016 17:00

Ghana
1

			1	2	3
1	(South Africa) (Ghana)	Jacob Maliekal; Daniel Sam	21; 11	21; 16
2	(South Africa) (Ghana)	Prakash Vijayanath; Emmanuel Donkor	14; 21	18; 21
3	(South Africa) (Ghana)	Cameron Coetzer; Abraham Ayittey	21; 9	21; 18
4	(South Africa) (Ghana)	Andries Malan / Willem Viljoen; Daniel Sam / Emmanuel Donkor	21; 6	21; 17
5	(South Africa) (Ghana)	Cameron Coetzer / Jacob Maliekal; Abraham Ayittey / Michael Opoku Baah				not played

- Mauritius vs. Algeria

Mauritius
3
National Badminton Centre, Court 4
18 February 2016 17:00

Algeria
0

			1	2	3
1	(Mauritius) (Algeria)	Georges Paul; Adel Hamek	21; 9	21; 17
2	(Mauritius) (Algeria)	Aatish Lubah; Youcef Sabri Medel	21; 16	21; 17
3	(Mauritius) (Algeria)	Christopher Paul; Mohamed Abderrahime Belarbi	21; 16	21; 16
4	(Mauritius) (Algeria)	Aatish Lubah / Georges Paul; Mohamed Abderrahime Belarbi / Adel Hamek				not played
5	(Mauritius) (Algeria)	Denneshsing Baboolall / Christopher Paul; Koceila Mammeri / Youcef Sabri Medel				not played

==== Final ====
- South Africa vs. Mauritius

South Africa
3
National Badminton Centre, Court 4
19 February 2016 17:00

Mauritius
1

			1	2	3
1	(South Africa) (Mauritius)	Jacob Maliekal; Georges Paul	21; 15	21; 14
2	(South Africa) (Mauritius)	Prakash Vijayanath; Aatish Lubah	21; 19	21; 17
3	(South Africa) (Mauritius)	Cameron Coetzer; Christopher Paul	19; 21	21; 15	19; 21
4	(South Africa) (Mauritius)	Andries Malan / Willem Viljoen; Aatish Lubah / Georges Paul	21; 12	21; 14
5	(South Africa) (Mauritius)	Cameron Coetzer / Jacob Maliekal; Denneshsing Baboolall / Christopher Paul				not played

== Women's team ==
=== Group stage ===
==== Group A ====
Pos	Team	Pld	W	L	MF	MA	MD	GF	GA	GD	PF	PA	PD	Pts	Qualification
1	Egypt	2	2	0	8	2	+6	17	5	+12	449	306	+143	2	Knockout stage
2	Uganda	2	1	1	6	4	+2	13	10	+3	401	404	−3	1	Knockout stage
3	Réunion	2	0	2	1	9	−8	3	18	−15	284	424	−140	0	

Source: TS
- Egypt vs. Reunion

Egypt
4
National Badminton Centre, Court 4
16 February 2016 17:00

Réunion
1

			1	2	3
1	(Egypt) (Réunion)	Hadia Hosny; Lise Oronoz	21; 14	21; 8
2	(Egypt) (Réunion)	Nadine Ashraf; Isabelle Lai-Cheung Kit	17; 21	19; 21
3	(Egypt) (Réunion)	Menna El-Tanany; Emilie Dault	21; 5	21; 11
4	(Egypt) (Réunion)	Nadine Ashraf / Menna El-Tanany; Emilie Dault / Lise Oronoz	21; 13	21; 13
5	(Egypt) (Réunion)	Doha Hany / Hadia Hosny; Isabelle Lai-Cheung Kit / Anne-Gaelle Laiguillon	21; 13	21; 6

- Uganda vs. Reunion

Uganda
5
National Badminton Centre, Court 2
17 February 2016 10:00

Réunion
0

			1	2	3
1	(Uganda) (Réunion)	Bridget Shamim Bangi; Anne-Gaelle Laiguillon	21; 12	21; 6
2	(Uganda) (Réunion)	Aisha Nakiyemba; Lise Oronoz	9; 21	22; 20	21; 18
3	(Uganda) (Réunion)	Daisy Nakalyango; Isabelle Lai-Cheung Kit	21; 15	21; 12
4	(Uganda) (Réunion)	Gloria Najjuka / Aisha Nakiyemba; Isabelle Lai-Cheung Kit / Lise Oronoz	21; 19	21; 18
5	(Uganda) (Réunion)	Bridget Shamim Bangi / Daisy Nakalyango; Emilie Dault / Anne-Gaelle Laiguillon	21; 10	21; 8

- Egypt vs. Uganda

Egypt
4
National Badminton Centre, Court 4
17 February 2016 17:00

Uganda
1

			1	2	3
1	(Egypt) (Uganda)	Hadia Hosny; Bridget Shamim Bangi	20; 22	21; 15	18; 21
2	(Egypt) (Uganda)	Menna El-Tanany; Aisha Nakiyemba	21; 13	21; 12
3	(Egypt) (Uganda)	Doha Hany; Daisy Nakalyango	21; 19	21; 16
4	(Egypt) (Uganda)	Nadine Ashraf / Menna El-Tanany; Gloria Najjuka / Aisha Nakiyemba	21; 12	21; 10
5	(Egypt) (Uganda)	Doha Hany / Hadia Hosny; Bridget Shamim Bangi / Daisy Nakalyango	18; 21	21; 7	21; 13

==== Group B ====
Pos	Team	Pld	W	L	MF	MA	MD	GF	GA	GD	PF	PA	PD	Pts	Qualification
1	Mauritius	2	2	0	10	0	+10	20	0	+20	420	160	+260	2	Knockout stage
2	Ghana	2	1	1	5	5	0	10	10	0	328	291	+37	1	Knockout stage
3	Zimbabwe	2	0	2	0	10	−10	0	20	−20	123	420	−297	0	

Source: TS
- Mauritius vs. Zimbabwe

Mauritius
5
National Badminton Centre, Court 6
16 February 2016 17:00

Zimbabwe
0

			1	2	3
1	(Mauritius) (Zimbabwe)	Kate Foo Kune; Olga Matsanura	21; 5	21; 2
2	(Mauritius) (Zimbabwe)	Nicki Chan-Lam; Audrey Matsanura	21; 7	21; 9
3	(Mauritius) (Zimbabwe)	Yeldy Louison; Kuzivakwashe Tritania Mudzamiri	21; 1	21; 3
4	(Mauritius) (Zimbabwe)	Kate Foo Kune / Yeldy Louison; Audrey Matsanura / Olga Matsanura	21; 8	21; 4
5	(Mauritius) (Zimbabwe)	Shama Aboobakar / Nicki Chan-Lam; Sophia Fernandes / Kuzivakwashe Tritania Mudzamiri	21; 0	21; 3

- Ghana vs. Zimbabwe

Ghana
5
National Badminton Centre, Court 8
17 February 2016 10:00

Zimbabwe
0

			1	2	3
1	(Ghana) (Zimbabwe)	Stella Koteikai Amasah; Olga Matsanura	21; 4	21; 14
2	(Ghana) (Zimbabwe)	Gifty Mensah; Audrey Matsanura	21; 15	21; 7
3	(Ghana) (Zimbabwe)	Diana Archer; Sophia Fernandes	21; 6	21; 8
4	(Ghana) (Zimbabwe)	Stella Koteikai Amasah / Gifty Mensah; Audrey Matsanura / Olga Matsanura	21; 8	21; 7
5	(Ghana) (Zimbabwe)	Diana Archer / Grace Atipaka; Sophia Fernandes / Kuzivakwashe Tritania Mudzamiri	21; 5	21; 7

- Mauritius vs. Ghana

Mauritius
5
National Badminton Centre, Court 2
17 February 2016 17:00

Ghana
0

			1	2	3
1	(Mauritius) (Ghana)	Kate Foo Kune; Grace Atipaka	21; 10	21; 13
2	(Mauritius) (Ghana)	Nicki Chan-Lam; Gifty Mensah	21; 6	21; 14
3	(Mauritius) (Ghana)	Yeldy Louison; Stella Koteikai Amasah	21; 15	21; 14
4	(Mauritius) (Ghana)	Kate Foo Kune / Yeldy Louison; Diana Archer / Grace Atipaka	21; 14	21; 6
5	(Mauritius) (Ghana)	Shama Aboobakar / Nicki Chan-Lam; Stella Koteikai Amasah / Gifty Mensah	21; 18	21; 8

=== Knockout stage ===
Semi-finals
18 February
Egypt	3
Ghana	0
18 February
Uganda	0
Mauritius	3

Final
19 February
Egypt	0
Mauritius	3

==== Semifinals ====
- Egypt vs. Ghana

Egypt
3
National Badminton Centre, Court 7
18 February 2016 17:00

Ghana
0

			1	2	3
1	(Egypt) (Ghana)	Hadia Hosny; Grace Atipaka	21; 11	21; 7
2	(Egypt) (Ghana)	Nadine Ashraf; Gifty Mensah	21; 16	21; 19
3	(Egypt) (Ghana)	Doha Hany; Stella Koteikai Amasah	21; 17	21; 19
4	(Egypt) (Ghana)	Nadine Ashraf / Menna El-Tanany; Diana Archer / Grace Atipaka				not played
5	(Egypt) (Ghana)	Doha Hany / Hadia Hosny; Stella Koteikai Amasah / Gifty Mensah

- Uganda vs. Mauritius

Uganda
0
National Badminton Centre, Court 5
18 February 2016 17:00

Mauritius
3

			1	2	3
1	(Uganda) (Mauritius)	Bridget Shamim Bangi; Kate Foo Kune	7; 21	20; 22
2	(Uganda) (Mauritius)	Gloria Najjuka; Nicki Chan-Lam	11; 21	6; 21
3	(Uganda) (Mauritius)	Daisy Nakalyango; Yeldy Louison	19; 21	21; 6	16; 21
4	(Uganda) (Mauritius)	Bridget Shamim Bangi / Aisha Nakiyemba; Kate Foo Kune / Yeldy Louison				not played
5	(Uganda) (Mauritius)	Gloria Najjuka / Daisy Nakalyango; Shama Aboobakar / Nicki Chan-Lam				not played

==== Final ====
- Egypt vs. Mauritius

Egypt
0
National Badminton Centre, Court 5
19 February 2016 17:00

Mauritius
3

			1	2	3
1	(Egypt) (Mauritius)	Hadia Hosny; Kate Foo Kune	10; 21	17; 21
2	(Egypt) (Mauritius)	Menna El-Tanany; Nicki Chan-Lam	10; 21	16; 21
3	(Egypt) (Mauritius)	Doha Hany; Yeldy Louison	14; 21	11; 21
4	(Egypt) (Mauritius)	Nadine Ashraf / Menna El-Tanany; Kate Foo Kune / Yeldy Louison				not played
5	(Egypt) (Mauritius)	Doha Hany / Hadia Hosny; Shama Aboobakar / Nicki Chan-Lam				not played
