= Luka Wraber =

Austrian badminton player (born 1990)

Personal information
- Born: 7 September 1990 (age 36) Wiener Neustadt, Austria
- Height: 1.78 m (5 ft 10 in)
- Weight: 71 kg (157 lb)

Sport
- Country: Austria
- Sport: Badminton
- Handedness: Right
- Coached by: Krasimir Yankov

Men's singles & doubles
- Highest ranking: 52 (MS 3 September 2015); 155 (MD 21 April 2016)
- Current ranking: 100 (31 January 2023)
- BWF profile

Luka Wraber (born 7 September 1990) is an Austrian badminton player, affiliated with the ASKÖ Neudörfl club. He started playing badminton at aged 8, and joined the Austrian national badminton team in 2008. He competed at the 2015 and 2019 European Games, and also at the 2020 Summer Olympics.

== Achievements ==
=== BWF International Challenge/Series (6 titles, 11 runners-up) ===
Men's singles
Year	Tournament	Opponent	Score	Result
2014	Lagos International	(Israel) Misha Zilberman	15–21, 12–21	(silver) Runner-up
2014	Mauritius International	(Austria) David Obernosterer	9–21, 21–18, 25–23	(gold) Winner
2014	Kenya International	(Iran) Farzin Khanjani	22–24, 9–21	(silver) Runner-up
2014	Ethiopia International	(Israel) Misha Zilberman	7–11, 9–11, 6–11	(silver) Runner-up
2014	South Africa International	(Uganda) Edwin Ekiring	16–21, 21–17, 21–15	(gold) Winner
2014	Botswana International	(Slovenia) Alen Roj	21–5, 21–8	(gold) Winner
2015	Santo Domingo Open	(Austria) David Obernosterer	17–21, 17–21	(silver) Runner-up
2015	Mauritius International	(Guatemala) Kevin Cordón	12–21, 18–21	(silver) Runner-up
2015	Ethiopia International	(Israel) Misha Zilberman	13–21, 9–21	(silver) Runner-up
2015	Nigeria International	(United States) Howard Shu	21–17, 14–21, 13–21	(silver) Runner-up
2016	Giraldilla International	(Cuba) Osleni Guerrero	16–21, 17–21	(silver) Runner-up
2019	Cameroon International	(Azerbaijan) Ade Resky Dwicahyo	20–22, 21–19, 16–21	(silver) Runner-up
2019	South Africa International	(Czech Republic) Milan Ludík	Walkover	(gold) Winner

Men's doubles
Year	Tournament	Partner	Opponent	Score	Result
2014	Ethiopia International	(Austria) Vilson Vattanirappel	(France) Arnaud Génin (Slovakia) Matej Hliničan	11–7, 11–3, 11–9	(gold) Winner
2014	South Africa International	(Slovenia) Alen Roj	(Iran) Mohamad Reza Khanjani (Iran) Farzin Khanjani	15–21, 11–21	(silver) Runner-up
2014	Botswana International	(Slovenia) Alen Roj	(South Africa) Andries Malan (South Africa) Willem Viljoen	21–14, 10–21, 19–21	(silver) Runner-up
2017	Peru International Series	(Austria) Daniel Graßmück	(Austria) Dominik Stipsits (Austria) Roman Zirnwald	14–21, 21–15, 21–15	(gold) Winner

BWF International Challenge tournament
BWF International Series tournament
BWF Future Series tournament
