= Farzin Khanjani =

Iranian badminton player (born 1994)

Personal information
- Born: 4 October 1994 (age 32)

Sport
- Country: Iran
- Sport: Badminton

Men's singles & doubles
- Highest ranking: 148 (MS 3 September 2015); 74 (MD 14 April 2016)
- BWF profile

Farzin Khanjani (born 4 October 1994) is an Iranian badminton player. At the age of 19, Khanjani won the men's singles title at the Kenya International tournament, and became the runner-up in the men's doubles event partnered with Mehran Shahbazi. He also won the South Africa International tournament in the men's doubles event in 2014 and 2015.

== Achievements ==
=== BWF International Challenge/Series (3 titles, 2 runners-up) ===
Men's singles
Year	Tournament	Opponent	Score	Result
2014	Kenya International	(Austria) Luka Wraber	24–22, 21–9	(gold) Winner

Men's doubles
Year	Tournament	Partner	Opponent	Score	Result
2014	Kenya International	(Iran) Mehran Shahbazi	(Iran) Soroush Eskandari (Iran) Hasan Motaghi	15–21, 13–21	(silver) Runner-up
2014	South Africa International	(Iran) Mohamad Reza Khanjani	(Austria) Luka Wraber (Slovenia) Alen Roj	21–15, 21–11	(gold) Winner
2015	South Africa International	(Iran) Soroush Eskandari	(South Africa) Andries Malan (South Africa) Willem Viljoen	17–21, 21–16, 21–18	(gold) Winner
2025	Iran International Khazar (Caspian) Cup	(Iran) Ali Hayati	(Iran) Mehdi Ansari (Iran) Amirhossein Hasani	15–8, 13–15, 13–15	(silver) Runner-up

BWF International Challenge tournament
BWF International Series tournament
BWF Future Series tournament
