= Mohammad Reza Khanjani =

Iranian badminton player (born 1992)

Mohamad Reza Khanjani
Personal information
- Born: 8 February 1992 (age 34)

Sport
- Country: Iran
- Sport: Badminton

Men's singles & doubles
- Highest ranking: 183 (MS 26 August 2010); 163 (MD 9 September 2010)
- BWF profile

Mohamad Reza Khanjani (born 8 February 1992) is an Iranian badminton player. In 2014, he won the men's doubles title at the South Africa International tournament, and in 2015, he was the runner-up at the Turkey International.

== Achievements ==
=== BWF International Challenge/Series ===
Men's doubles

Year	Tournament	Partner	Opponent	Score	Result
2014	South Africa International	(Iran) Farzin Khanjani	(Austria) Luka Wraber (Slovenia) Alen Roj	21–15, 21–11	(gold) Winner
2015	Turkey International	(Iran) Ashkan Fesahati	(Hungary) Gergely Krausz (Thailand) Samatcha Tovannakasem	6–21, 6–21	(silver) Runner-up

BWF International Challenge tournament
BWF International Series tournament
BWF Future Series tournament
