= Sahir Edoo =

Mauritian badminton player (born 1987)

Personal information
- Born: Sahir Adool Edoo; 13 October 1987 (age 38) Rose Hill, Mauritius
- Height: 1.79 m (5 ft 10 in)
- Weight: 67 kg (148 lb)

Sport
- Country: Mauritius
- Sport: Badminton

Men's
- Highest ranking: 170 (MS 8 April 2010); 97 (MD 26 August 2010); 151 (XD 17 April 2014)
- BWF profile
Medal record
Men's badminton
Representing Mauritius
African Championships
Bronze medal – third place	2013 Rose Hill	Mixed doubles
Bronze medal – third place	2013 Rose Hill	Mixed team
Africa Team Championships
Silver medal – second place	2016 Rose Hill	Men's team
Silver medal – second place	2010 Kampala	Men's team

Sahir Abdool Edoo (born 13 October 1987) is a Mauritian badminton player. He competed at the 2010 and 2014 Commonwealth Games. He is now serves as a secretary general at the Badminton Confederation of Africa.

== Achievements ==
=== African Championships ===
Mixed doubles

Year	Venue	Partner	Opponent	Score	Result
2013	National Badminton Centre, Rose Hill, Mauritius	(Mauritius) Yeldy Marie Louison	(South Africa) Andries Malan (South Africa) Jennifer Fry	19–21, 15–21	Bronze

=== BWF International Challenge/Series ===
Men's doubles

Year	Tournament	Partner	Opponent	Score	Result
2010	Mauritius International	(Mauritius) Yoni Louison	(India) Raheem A. Abdul (India) Aloysius Vijay Anthony Raj	21–17, 22–20	(gold) Winner

Mixed doubles

Year	Tournament	Partner	Opponent	Score	Result
2016	Rose Hill International	(Mauritius) Yeldy Marie Louison	(Ghana) Emmanuel Yaw Donkor (Ghana) Gifty Mensah	21–18, 27–29, 26–24	(gold) Winner
2015	Mauritius International	(Mauritius) Yeldy Marie Louison	(South Africa) Andries Malan (South Africa) Jennifer Fry	18–21, 16–21	(silver) Runner-up
2013	South Africa International	(Mauritius) Yeldy Marie Louison	(Egypt) Abdelrahman Kashkal (Egypt) Hadia Hosny	12–21, 19–21	(silver) Runner-up
2013	Botswana International	(Mauritius) Yeldy Marie Louison	(Egypt) Abdelrahman Kashkal (Egypt) Hadia Hosny	21–15, 14–21, 17–21	(silver) Runner-up

BWF International Challenge tournament
BWF International Series tournament
BWF Future Series tournament
