= Congo national badminton team =

National badminton team representing the Republic of the Congo (Congo-Brazzaville)

Congo
- Association: Fédération Congolaise de Badminton (FECOBAD)
- Confederation: BCA (Africa)
- President: Thomas Bakala

BWF ranking
- Current ranking: 123 (2 April 2024)
- Highest ranking: 91 (1 October 2015)

African Mixed Team Championships
- Appearances: 1 (first in 2014)
- Best result: Group stage

The Congo national badminton team (French: Équipe nationale de badminton du Congo; Lingala: Timu ye teifa ye badminton ye Repubilika ya Kôngo) represents the Republic of the Congo in international team competitions and is controlled by the national governing body for badminton body in the Republic of the Congo, the Congolese Badminton Federation (FECOBAD; Fédération Congolaise de Badminton).

Founded in the early 2000s, the team did not compete in any international team events until 2011 when they debuted at the 2011 All-African Games mixed team event. The team also made their first appearance at the African Badminton Championships in 2014.

== History ==
=== Mixed team ===
The Congo national team first competed in the 2011 All-African Games. The team were drawn into Group D with South Africa, Botswana and Ethiopia. The team placed fourth in the group and were eliminated in the group stages after losing 5−0 to South Africa and 4−1 to Botswana and Ethiopia. In 2014, the team competed in the 2014 African Badminton Championships. The team finished on the bottom of Group B after losing 5−0 to all of their opponents in the group.

In 2015, the team competed in the African Games as the host team. The team were drawn into Group A with Mauritius and Ghana. The team were eliminated after losing 5−0 to Mauritius and Ghana.

== Competitive record ==
=== Thomas Cup ===
| Year | Round | Pos |
|---|---|---|
| 1949 to 1958 | Part of France | |
| 1961 to 2024 | Did not enter | |
| 2026 | To be determined | |
| 2028 | To be determined | |
| 2030 | To be determined | |

=== Uber Cup ===
| Year | Round | Pos |
|---|---|---|
| 1957 | Part of France | |
| 1960 | Part of France | |
| 1963 to 2024 | Did not enter | |
| 2026 | To be determined | |
| 2028 | To be determined | |
| 2030 | To be determined | |

=== Sudirman Cup ===
| Year | Round | Pos |
|---|---|---|
| 1989 to 2023 | Did not enter | |
| 2025 | To be determined | |
| 2027 | To be determined | |
| 2029 | To be determined | |

=== African Games ===
==== Mixed team ====
| Year | Round | Pos |
|---|---|---|
| 2003 | Did not enter | |
| 2007 | Did not enter | |
| 2011 | Group stage | |
| 2015 | Group stage | |
| 2019 | Did not enter | |
| 2027 | To be determined | |

=== African Team Championships ===
==== Men's team ====
| Year | Round | Pos |
|---|---|---|
| 1979 to 2024 | Did not enter | |
| 2026 | To be determined | |
| 2028 | To be determined | |
| 2030 | To be determined | |

==== Women's team ====
| Year | Round | Pos |
|---|---|---|
| 1979 to 2024 | Did not enter | |
| 2026 | To be determined | |
| 2028 | To be determined | |
| 2030 | To be determined | |

==== Mixed team ====
| Year | Round | Pos |
|---|---|---|
| 1980 to 2013 | Did not enter | |
| 2014 | Group stage | |
| 2017 | Did not enter | |
| 2019 | Did not enter | |
| 2021 | Did not enter | |
| 2023 | Did not enter | |
| 2025 | To be determined | |
| 2027 | To be determined | |
| 2029 | To be determined | |

**Red border color indicates tournament was held on home soil.

== Junior competitive record ==
=== Suhandinata Cup ===
| Year | Round | Pos |
|---|---|---|
| 2000 to 2023 | Did not enter | |
| 2024 | To be determined | |

=== African Youth Games ===
==== Men's team ====
| Year | Round | Pos |
|---|---|---|
| 2018 | Did not enter | |

==== Women's team ====
| Year | Round | Pos |
|---|---|---|
| 2018 | Did not enter | |

==== Mixed team ====
| Year | Round | Pos |
|---|---|---|
| 2014 | Did not enter | |

=== African Junior Team Championships ===
==== Mixed team ====
| Year | Round | Pos |
|---|---|---|
| 1979 to 2022 | Did not enter | |
| 2024 | To be determined | |

**Red border color indicates tournament was held on home soil.

== Players ==
=== Current squad ===
As of 2 January 2024

==== Men's team ====
| Name | DoB/Age | Ranking of event | | |
| Name | DoB/Age | MS | MD | XD |
|---|---|---|---|---|
| Gislain Ilouwo | 20 March 2002 (aged 23) | - | - | - |
| Devins Mananga | 25 September 1996 (aged 28) | - | - | - |
| Jordan Oyou | 21 December 1989 (aged 35) | - | - | - |
| Sanat Mouanda | 30 March 1988 (aged 36) | - | - | - |

==== Women's team ====
| Name | DoB/Age | Ranking of event | | |
| Name | DoB/Age | WS | WD | XD |
|---|---|---|---|---|
| Minelie Kassangoyi | 19 September 1991 (aged 33) | - | - | - |
| Bztecho Loubaki | 23 May 1989 (aged 35) | - | - | - |
| Benele Issoko | 30 November 1990 (aged 34) | - | - | - |
| Aisse Soukouna | 29 September 1985 (aged 39) | - | - | - |
