= Xue Song (badminton) =

Chinese badminton player

Xue Song 薛松
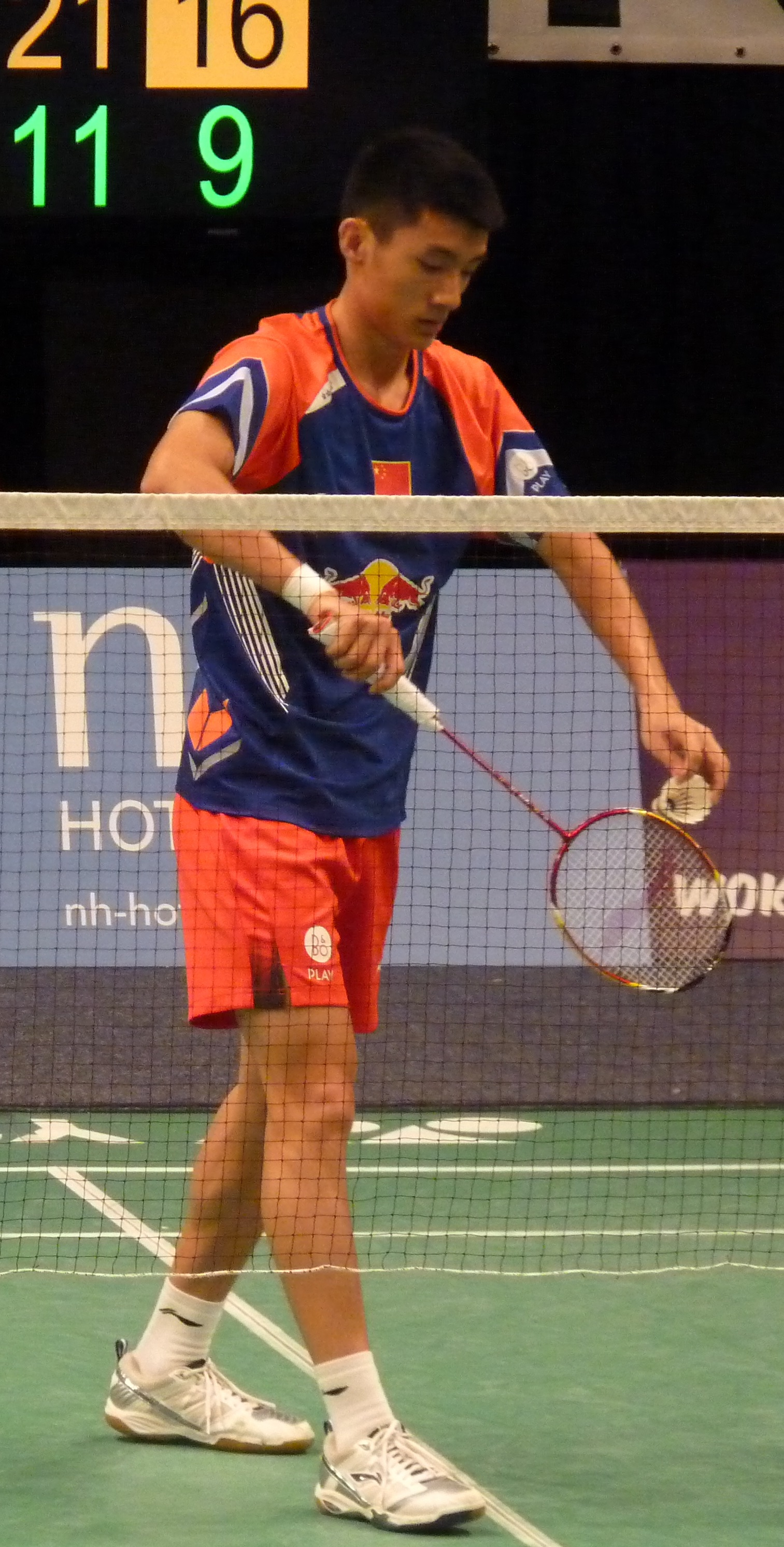

Personal information
- Born: 22 January 1994 (age 32) Zhenjiang, Jiangsu, China
- Height: 1.75 m (5 ft 9 in)

Sport
- Country: China
- Sport: Badminton
- Handedness: Right

Men's singles
- Highest ranking: 17 (27 August 2015)
- BWF profile
Medal record
Men's badminton
Representing China
World Junior Championships
Gold medal – first place	2012 Chiba	Mixed team
Silver medal – second place	2012 Chiba	Boys' singles
Asian Junior Championships
Gold medal – first place	2011 Lucknow	Mixed team
Silver medal – second place	2012 Gimcheon	Mixed team

Xue Song (Chinese: 薛松; born 22 January 1994) is a Chinese badminton player who specializes in men's singles.

== Career ==
In 2002, Xue was sent to train at the badminton school in Jiangsu, and at age 13, he won the national junior title in the singles and doubles events. At the age of 15, he trained in Hong Kong for two years, then he joined the badminton club in Guangdong. In 2011, he was selected to join the national team. He first attracted international attention when he defeated 2010 champion Viktor Axelsen at the 2012 World Junior Championships and went on to reach the final, where he lost to Kento Momota.

He started his senior career at the 2013 Australian Open, and at that tournament, he beat a former world No. 1 Taufik Hidayat, and also a Vietnamese senior player Nguyễn Tiến Minh. In the final, he was defeated by his compatriot Tian Houwei in the rubber game. He also was the runner-up at the New Zealand Open lost to the Japanese player Riichi Takeshita. He won his first international title at the 2014 India Open Grand Prix Gold tournament.

== Achievements ==
=== World Junior Championships ===
Boys' singles
Year	Venue	Opponent	Score	Result
2012	Chiba Port Arena; Chiba, Japan	(Japan) Kento Momota	17–21, 21–19, 19–21	Silver

=== BWF Grand Prix ===
The BWF Grand Prix had two levels, the BWF Grand Prix and Grand Prix Gold. It was a series of badminton tournaments sanctioned by the Badminton World Federation (BWF) which was held from 2007 to 2017.

Men's singles
Year	Tournament	Opponent	Score	Result
2013	Australian Open	(China) Tian Houwei	22–20, 13–21, 12–21	(silver) Runner-up
2013	New Zealand Open	(Japan) Riichi Takeshita	16–21, 21–16, 17–21	(silver) Runner-up
2014	India Grand Prix Gold	(India) Srikanth Kidambi	16–21, 21–19, 21–13	(gold) Winner
2014	Macau Open	(Hong Kong) Wong Wing Ki	16–21, 21–13, 21–19	(gold) Winner

BWF Grand Prix Gold tournament
BWF Grand Prix tournament
