= Kek Jamnik =

Slovenian badminton player (born 1991)

Personal information
- Born: 15 October 1991 (age 35)

Sport
- Country: Slovenia
- Sport: Badminton

Men's singles & doubles
- Highest ranking: 295 (MS 14 August 2014); 112 (MD 20 February 2014); 151 (XD 18 July 2013)
- BWF profile

Kek Jamnik (born 15 October 1991) is a Slovenian badminton player. He won the men's doubles title at the 2013 Botswana International partnered with Alen Roj.

== Achievements ==
=== BWF International Challenge/Series ===
Men's doubles
Year	Tournament	Partner	Opponent	Score	Result
2013	Irish International	(Slovenia) Alen Roj	(Republic of Ireland) Jonathan Dolan (Republic of Ireland) Sam Magee	12–21, 9–21	(silver) Runner-up
2013	Botswana International	(Slovenia) Alen Roj	(South Africa) Andries Malan (Serbia) Jovica Rujević	14–21, 21–15, 21–14	(gold) Winner
2013	South Africa International	(Slovenia) Alen Roj	(Mauritius) Aatish Lubah (Mauritius) Julien Paul	20–22, 22–20, 20–22	(silver) Runner-up

Commonwealth Youth Games tournament
BWF International Series tournament
BWF Future Series tournament
