= Alen Roj =

Slovenian badminton player (born 1992)

Personal information
- Born: 10 November 1992 (age 34) Maribor, Slovenia

Sport
- Country: Slovenia
- Sport: Badminton

Men's singles & doubles
- Highest ranking: 133 (MS 29 October 2015); 112 (MD 20 February 2014)
- BWF profile

Alen Roj (born 10 November 1992) is a Slovenian badminton player. In 2015, he became the runner-up of Egypt International tournament in the men's singles event. In 2020, he was appointed as a coach in Luxembourg national team. He is married German badminton player, Olga Konon in 2018.

== Achievements ==
=== BWF International Challenge/Series (6 runners-up) ===
Men's singles
Year	Tournament	Opponent	Score	Result
2013	Botswana International	(South Africa) Jacob Maliekal	20–22, 15–21	(silver) Runner-up
2013	South Africa International	(South Africa) Jacob Maliekal	22–20, 15–21, 10–21	(silver) Runner-up
2014	Zambia International	(Uganda) Edwin Ekiring	18–21, 8–21	(silver) Runner-up
2014	Botswana International	(Austria) Luka Wraber	5–21, 8–21	(silver) Runner-up
2015	Egypt International	(Uganda) Edwin Ekiring	23–21, 23–25, 18–21	(silver) Runner-up

Men's doubles
Year	Tournament	Partner	Opponent	Score	Result
2013	Irish International	(Slovenia) Kek Jamnik	(Republic of Ireland) Jonathan Dolan (Republic of Ireland) Sam Magee	12–21, 9–21	(silver) Runner-up
2013	Botswana International	(Slovenia) Kek Jamnik	(South Africa) Andries Malan (Serbia) Jovica Rujević	14–21, 21–15, 21–14	(gold) Winner
2013	South Africa International	(Slovenia) Kek Jamnik	(Mauritius) Aatish Lubah (Mauritius) Julien Paul	20–22, 22–20, 20–22	(silver) Runner-up
2014	South Africa International	(Austria) Luka Wraber	(Iran) Farzin Khanjani (Iran) Mohamad Reza Khanjani	15–21, 11–21	(silver) Runner-up
2014	Botswana International	(Austria) Luka Wraber	(South Africa) Andries Malan (South Africa) Willem Viljoen	21–14, 10–21, 19–21	(silver) Runner-up

Commonwealth Youth Games tournament
BWF International Series tournament
BWF Future Series tournament
