= Yoni Louison =

Mauritian badminton player (born 1986)

Personal information
- Born: Yoni Dany Louison; 14 December 1986 (age 39)

Sport
- Country: Mauritius
- Sport: Badminton

Men's
- Highest ranking: 241 (MS) 25 Mar 2010; 97 (MD) 26 Aug 2010; 144 (XD) 19 Apr 2012
- BWF profile
Medal record
Badminton
Representing Mauritius
All-Africa Games
Bronze medal – third place	2011 Maputo	Mixed team
African Championships
Bronze medal – third place	2011 Marrakesh	Mixed team
Africa Team Championships
Silver medal – second place	2010 Kampala	Men's team
Bronze medal – third place	2012 Addis Ababa	Men's team
Bronze medal – third place	2008 Rose Hill	Men's team

Yoni Dany Louison (born 14 December 1986) is a Mauritian male badminton player.

== Achievements ==
=== BWF International Challenge/Series ===
Men's Doubles
Year	Tournament	Partner	Opponent	Score	Result
2012	Mauritius International	(Mauritius) Denneshsing Baboolall	(Malaysia) Gan Teik Chai (Malaysia) Ong Soon Hock	9-21, 10-21	(silver) Runner-up
2010	Mauritius International	(Mauritius) Sahir Edoo	(India) A. Abdul Raheem (India) Aloysius Vijay Anthony Raj	21-17, 22-20	(gold) Winner

BWF International Challenge tournament
BWF International Series tournament
BWF Future Series tournament
