= Jonathan Dolan (badminton) =

Irish badminton player

Personal information
- Born: 19 December 1994 (age 31) Sligo, Ireland
- Height: 1.905 m (6 ft 3 in)

Sport
- Country: Ireland
- Sport: Badminton
- Handedness: Right

Men's singles & doubles
- Highest ranking: 219 (MS 10 April 2014); 68 (MD 5 June 2014); 446 (XD 14 March 2013)
- BWF profile

Jonathan Dolan (born 19 December 1994) is an Irish badminton player. As a junior player, he was a champion at the 2012 Bulgarian and Irish Junior International Open badminton competition (U-19). In the senior event, he clinched the men's doubles title at the 2013 Irish Future Series tournament with his partner Sam Magee. Dolan also won the Irish National Badminton Championships in the men's singles and doubles event in 2014 and 2019. He entered the Badminton Europe Centre of Excellence (CoE) program in February 2018.

== Achievements ==
=== BWF International Challenge/Series ===
Men's singles
Year	Tournament	Opponent	Score	Result
2019	Cyprus International	(England) Alex Lane	15–4 Retired	(gold) Winner
2019	Czech Open	(England) David Jones	22–20, 21–9	(gold) Winner

Men's doubles
Year	Tournament	Partner	Opponent	Score	Result
2013	Irish International	(Republic of Ireland) Sam Magee	(Slovenia) Kek Jamnik (Slovenia) Alen Roj	21–12, 21–9	(gold) Winner

BWF International Challenge tournament
BWF International Series tournament
BWF Future Series tournament
