= Denneshsing Baboolall =

Mauritian badminton player (born 1984)

Personal information
- Born: 11 May 1984 (age 42)
- Height: 1.80 m (5 ft 11 in)
- Weight: 70 kg (154 lb)

Sport
- Country: Mauritius
- Sport: Badminton

Men's
- Highest ranking: 310 (MS) 21 Jun 2012; 156 (MD) 10 May 2012; 268 (XD) 3 May 2012
- BWF profile
Medal record
Badminton
Representing Mauritius
All-Africa Games
Bronze medal – third place	2011 Maputo	Mixed team
African Championships
Bronze medal – third place	2014 Gaborone	Men's doubles
Bronze medal – third place	2014 Gaborone	Mixed team
Bronze medal – third place	2013 Rose Hill	Mixed doubles
Bronze medal – third place	2013 Rose Hill	Mixed team
Bronze medal – third place	2011 Marrakesh	Mixed team
Africa Team Championships
Silver medal – second place	2016 Rose Hill	Men's team
Bronze medal – third place	2012 Addis Ababa	Men's team

Denneshsing Baboolall (born 11 May 1984) is a Mauritian male badminton player.

== Achievements ==
=== African Badminton Championships ===
Men's Doubles
Year	Venue	Partner	Opponent	Score	Result
2014	Lobatse Stadium, Gaborone, Botswana	(Mauritius) Julien Paul	(Nigeria) Joseph Abah Eneojo (Nigeria) Victor Makanju	21–18, 18–21, 19–21	Bronze

Mixed Doubles
Year	Venue	Partner	Opponent	Score	Result
2013	National Badminton Centre; Rose Hill, Mauritius	(Mauritius) Shama Aboobakar	(South Africa) Willem Viljoen (South Africa) Michelle Butler-Emmett	15–21, 18–21	Bronze

=== BWF International Challenge/Series ===
Men's Singles
Year	Tournament	Opponent	Score	Result
2012	Mauritius International	(Malaysia) Kuan Beng Hong	11-21, 18–21	(silver) Runner-up

Men's Doubles
Year	Tournament	Partner	Opponent	Score	Result
2013	Mauritius International	(Mauritius) Julien Paul	(South Africa) Andries Malan (South Africa) Willem Viljoen	11-21, 17–21	(silver) Runner-up
2012	Mauritius International	(Mauritius) Yoni Louison	(Malaysia) Gan Teik Chai (Malaysia) Ong Soon Hock	9-21, 10–21	(silver) Runner-up

Mixed Doubles
Year	Tournament	Partner	Opponent	Score	Result
2012	Mauritius International	(Mauritius) Shama Aboobakar	(Seychelles) Georgie Cupidon (Seychelles) Cynthia Course	19-21, 14–21	(silver) Runner-up

BWF International Challenge tournament
BWF International Series tournament
BWF Future Series tournament
