= Nicki Chan-Lam =

Personal information
- Born: Nicola Chan Lam; 4 November 1991 (age 34) London, England
- Height: 1.55 m (5 ft 1 in)
- Weight: 60 kg (132 lb)

Sport
- Country: Mauritius
- Sport: Badminton
- Handedness: Right

Women's singles
- Highest ranking: 230 (2 Jun 2016)
- BWF profile
Medal record
Women's badminton
Representing Mauritius
African Games
Gold medal – first place	2015 Brazzaville	Mixed team
Bronze medal – third place	2015 Brazzaville	Women's singles
Africa Team Championships
Gold medal – first place	2018 Algiers	Women's team
Gold medal – first place	2016 Rose Hill	Women's team

Nicola Chan-Lam (born 4 November 1991) is a former English badminton player who later represented Mauritius. Chan-Lam competed for Mauritius at the 2014 and 2018 Commonwealth Games. She was one of the 14 players selected for the Road to Rio Program, a program that aimed to help African badminton players to compete at the 2016 Olympic Games. In 2015, she won a bronze medal in the women's singles event and a gold medal in the mixed team event at the African Games.

== Personal life ==
Chan-Lam lives in St Albans and works in London.

== Achievements ==
=== All African Games ===
Women's singles

Year	Venue	Opponent	Score	Result
2015	Gymnase Étienne Mongha, Brazzaville, Republic of the Congo	(Nigeria) Grace Gabriel	9–21, 10–21	Bronze
