= Andries Malan =

South African badminton player (born 1994)

Personal information
- Born: 20 October 1994 (age 32) Bellville, Western Cape, South Africa
- Height: 1.79 m (5 ft 10 in)
- Weight: 78 kg (172 lb)

Sport
- Country: South Africa
- Sport: Badminton
- Handedness: Right

Men's singles & doubles
- Highest ranking: 369 (MS 14 March 2013); 47 (MD 28 April 2016); 83 (XD 28 January 2016)
- BWF profile
Medal record
Men's badminton
Representing South Africa
All-Africa Games
Gold medal – first place	2015 Brazzaville	Men's doubles
Gold medal – first place	2015 Brazzaville	Mixed doubles
Silver medal – second place	2015 Brazzaville	Mixed team
African Championships
Gold medal – first place	2017 Benoni	Mixed doubles
Gold medal – first place	2014 Gaborone	Men's doubles
Gold medal – first place	2014 Gaborone	Mixed team
Gold medal – first place	2013 Rose Hill	Men's doubles
Gold medal – first place	2013 Rose Hill	Mixed team
Silver medal – second place	2017 Benoni	Men's doubles
Silver medal – second place	2017 Benoni	Mixed team
Silver medal – second place	2014 Gaborone	Mixed doubles
Silver medal – second place	2013 Rose Hill	Mixed doubles
Africa Team Championships
Gold medal – first place	2016 Rose Hill	Men's team

Andries Malan (born 20 October 1994) is a South African badminton player. In 2014, he competed at the Commonwealth Games in Glasgow, Scotland. In 2015, he won double titles at the All-Africa Games by winning men's and mixed doubles event.

== Achievements ==
=== All-Africa Games ===
Men's doubles
Year	Venue	Partner	Opponent	Score	Result
2015	Gymnase Étienne Mongha; Brazzaville, Republic of the Congo	(South Africa) Willem Viljoen	(Egypt) Ali Ahmed El Khateeb (Egypt) Abdelrahman Kashkal	21–10, 21–13	Gold

Mixed doubles
Year	Venue	Partner	Opponent	Score	Result
2015	Gymnase Étienne Mongha; Brazzaville, Republic of the Congo	(South Africa) Jennifer Fry	(South Africa) Willem Viljoen (South Africa) Michelle Butler-Emmett	21–17, 23–21	Gold

=== African Championships ===
Men's doubles
Year	Venue	Partner	Opponent	Score	Result
2017	John Barrable Hall; Benoni, South Africa	(South Africa) James Hilton McManus	(Algeria) Koceila Mammeri (Algeria) Youcef Sabri Medel	21–13, 19–21, 9–21	Silver
2014	Lobatse Stadium; Gaborone, Botswana	(South Africa) Willem Viljoen	(Nigeria) Enejoh Abah (Nigeria) Victor Makanju	21–8, 21–15	Gold
2013	National Badminton Centre; Rose Hill, Mauritius	(South Africa) Willem Viljoen	(Nigeria) Enejoh Abah (Nigeria) Victor Makanju	21–11, 21–12	Gold

Mixed doubles
Year	Venue	Partner	Opponent	Score	Result
2017	John Barrable Hall; Benoni, South Africa	(South Africa) Jennifer Fry	(Mauritius) Georges Julien Paul (Mauritius) Kate Foo Kune	21–19, 19–21, 21–19	Gold
2014	Lobatse Stadium; Gaborone, Botswana	(South Africa) Jennifer Fry	(South Africa) Willem Viljoen (South Africa) Michelle Butler-Emmett	18–21, 17–21	Silver
2013	National Badminton Centre; Rose Hill, Mauritius	(South Africa) Jennifer Fry	(South Africa) Willem Viljoen (South Africa) Michelle Butler-Emmett	18–21, 22–20, 9–21	Silver

=== BWF International Challenge/Series (16 titles, 9 runners-up) ===
Men's singles
Year	Tournament	Opponent	Score	Result
2012	Botswana International	(Scotland) Alistair Casey	13–21, 7–21	(silver) Runner-up

Men's doubles
Year	Tournament	Partner	Opponent	Score	Result
2016	Rose-Hill International	(South Africa) Willem Viljoen	(Algeria) Mohamed Abderrahime Belrabi (Algeria) Adel Hamek	21–18, 21–18	(gold) Winner
2015	Botswana International	(South Africa) Willem Viljoen	(Algeria) Mohamed Abderrahime Belarbi (Algeria) Adel Hamek	21–11, 21–8	(gold) Winner
2015	South Africa International	(South Africa) Willem Viljoen	(Iran) Vatannejad-Soroush Eskandari (Iran) Farzin Khanjani	21–17, 16–21, 18–21	(silver) Runner-up
2015	Zambia International	(South Africa) Willem Viljoen	(Egypt) Ali Ahmed El Khateeb (Egypt) Abdelrahman Kashkal	21–14, 21–15	(gold) Winner
2015	Ethiopia International	(South Africa) Willem Viljoen	(Turkey) Emre Vural (Turkey) Sinan Zorlu	21–10, 21–13	(gold) Winner
2015	Mauritius International	(South Africa) Willem Viljoen	(India) Shlok Ramchandran (India) Sanyam Shukla	19–21, 12–21	(silver) Runner-up
2014	Botswana International	(South Africa) Willem Viljoen	(Austria) Luka Wraber (Slovenia) Alen Roj	14–21, 21–10, 21–19	(gold) Winner
2014	Zambia International	(South Africa) Willem Viljoen	(Italy) Giovanni Greco (Italy) Rosario Maddaloni	14–21, 16–21	(silver) Runner-up
2014	Lagos International	(South Africa) Willem Viljoen	(Nigeria) Jinkan Ifraimu Bulus (Nigeria) Ola Fagbemi	21–14, 22–20	(gold) Winner
2014	Uganda International	(South Africa) Willem Viljoen	(Malaysia) Chong Chun Quan (Malaysia) Yeoh Seng Zoe	14–21, 21–11, 14–21	(silver) Runner-up
2013	Botswana International	(Serbia) Jovica Rujevic	(Slovenia) Roj Alen (Slovenia) Kek Jamnik	14–21, 21–15, 14–21	(silver) Runner-up
2013	Mauritius International	(South Africa) Willem Viljoen	(Mauritius) Denneshsing Baboolall (Mauritius) Julien Paul	21–11, 21–17	(gold) Winner
2012	South Africa International	(South Africa) Willem Viljoen	(South Africa) Dorian Lance James (South Africa) Enrico James	24–22, 9–21, 24–22	(gold) Winner
2012	Botswana International	(South Africa) Reneshan Naidoo	(Botswana) Godwin Mathumo (Botswana) Orideetse Thela	21–13, 21–17	(gold) Winner

Mixed doubles
Year	Tournament	Partner	Opponent	Score	Result
2018	South Africa International	(South Africa) Jennifer Fry	(Jordan) Bahaedeen Ahmad Alshannik (Jordan) Domou Amro	21–14, 21–16	(gold) Winner
2018	Botswana International	(South Africa) Jennifer Fry	(Jordan) Bahaedeen Ahmad Alshannik (Jordan) Domou Amro	21–18, 20–22, 21–19	(gold) Winner
2017	South Africa International	(South Africa) Jennifer Fry	(India) Saurabh Sharma (India) Anoushka Parikh	21–19, 21–19	(gold) Winner
2017	Botswana International	(South Africa) Jennifer Fry	(Mauritius) Georges Julien Paul (Mauritius) Aurelie Marie Elisa Allet	21–15, 21–13	(gold) Winner
2016	South Africa International	(South Africa) Sandra le Grange	(Russia) Anatoliy Yartsev (Russia) Evgeniya Kosetskaya	13–21, 9–21	(silver) Runner-up
2015	South Africa International	(South Africa) Jennifer Fry	(Egypt) Abdelrahman Kashkal (Egypt) Hadia Hosny	12–21, 21–19, 21–18	(gold) Winner
2015	Mauritius International	(South Africa) Jennifer Fry	(Mauritius) Sahir Abdool Edoo (Mauritius) Yeldy Marie Louison	21–18, 21–16	(gold) Winner
2014	Mauritius International	(South Africa) Jennifer Fry	(Germany) Andreas Heinz (Germany) Annika Horbach	21–15, 18–21, 16–21	(silver) Runner-up
2014	Lagos International	(South Africa) Jennifer Fry	(Nigeria) Enejoh Abah (Nigeria) Tosin Damilola Atolagbe	24–26, 20–22	(silver) Runner-up
2012	Botswana International	(South Africa) Jennifer Van Den Berg	(South Africa) Reneshan Naidoo (South Africa) Elme de Villiers	21–10, 12–21, 21–15	(gold) Winner

BWF International Challenge tournament
BWF International Series tournament
BWF Future Series tournament
