= Solomon Mensah Nyarko =

Ghanaian badminton player (born 1989)

Personal information
- Born: 18 February 1989 (age 37)
- Height: 1.68 m (5 ft 6 in)
- Weight: 65 kg (143 lb)

Sport
- Country: Ghana
- Sport: Badminton

Men's
- Highest ranking: 368 (MS) 25 Mar 2010; 250 (MD) 8 Jul 2010; 526 (XD) 5 Jul 2012
- BWF profile
Medal record
Badminton
Representing Ghana
All-Africa Games
Bronze medal – third place	2011 Maputo	Men's doubles

Solomon Mensah Nyarko (born 18 February 1989) is a Ghanaian male badminton player. He competed at the 2010 Commonwealth Games in New Delhi, India. In 2011, he won the bronze medal at the All-Africa Games.

== Achievements ==
=== All-Africa Games ===
Men's doubles

Year	Venue	Partner	Adversary	Score	Result
2011	Escola Josina Machel, Maputo, Mozambique	(Ghana) Daniel Sam	(South Africa) Dorian James (South Africa) Willem Viljoen	7–21, 13–21	Bronze
