= Gifty Mensah =

Ghanaian badminton player (born 1998)

Personal information
- Born: 7 October 1998 (age 27) Jamestown, Accra, Ghana
- Height: 1.71 m (5 ft 7 in)
- Weight: 60 kg (132 lb)

Sport
- Country: Ghana
- Sport: Badminton
- Handedness: Right
- Coached by: Davis Efraim

Women's singles & doubles
- Highest ranking: 435 (WS 28 April 2016); 471 (WD 13 September 2012); 418 (XD 22 September 2016)
- BWF profile

Gifty Mensah (born 7 October 1998) is a Ghanaian badminton player who joined the national team in 2010. In 2011, she plays for Accra, compete at the Ghana Independence Day Open Championship. She won a gold in the women's doubles and a silver in the singles. At the same year, she was selected to represent her country to compete at the All-Africa Games. Teamed-up with Daniel Sam, they were the finalist at the 2015 Nigeria International tournament. In 2016, she was the runner-up at the Rose Hill International tournament in the mixed doubles event with Emmanuel Donkor, after battling with the Mauritanian Edoo and Louison. She also took the third place in the women's doubles event with Stella Amassah. In 2018, she competed at the Commonwealth Games in Gold Coast.

== Achievements ==
=== BWF International Challenge/Series ===
Mixed Doubles

Year	Tournament	Partner	Opponent	Score	Result
2016	Rose Hill International	(Ghana) Emmanuel Yaw Donkor	(Mauritius) Sahir Edoo (Mauritius) Yeldy Louison	18–21, 29–27, 24–26	(silver) Runner-up
2015	Nigeria International	(Ghana) Daniel Sam	(Nigeria) Olorunfemi Elewa (Nigeria) Susan Ideh	19–21, 17–21	(silver) Runner-up

BWF International Challenge tournament
BWF International Series tournament
BWF Future Series tournament
