= Daniel Sam (badminton) =

Ghanaian badminton player (born 1994)

Personal information
- Born: 7 January 1994 (age 32) Sekondi-Takoradi, Ghana
- Years active: Banned by disciplinary committee from Sports until 2028
- Height: 1.75 m (5 ft 9 in)
- Weight: 64 kg (141 lb)

Sport
- Country: Ghana
- Sport: Badminton
- Handedness: Right
- Coached by: Jacob Evans Wilson

Men's singles & doubles
- Highest ranking: 237 (MS 30 August 2018); 190 (MD 10 July 2014); 248 (XD 16 October 2014)
- BWF profile
Medal record
Men's badminton
Representing Ghana
All-Africa Games
Bronze medal – third place	2011 Maputo	Men's doubles
African Championships
Bronze medal – third place	2019 Port Harcourt	Mixed team
Africa Team Championships
Bronze medal – third place	2018 Algiers	Men's team
Bronze medal – third place	2016 Rose Hill	Men's team

Daniel Sam (born 7 January 1994) is a Ghanaian badminton player. He competed at the 2010, 2014 and 2018 Commonwealth Games. In 2011, he won the bronze medal at the All-Africa Games in the men's doubles event partnered with Solomon Mensah Nyarko. He was one of the 14 players selected for the Road to Rio Program, a program that aimed to help African badminton players to compete at the 2016 Olympic Games. Having faced disciplinary issues including being suspended for six times in ten years, he was banned for 6 years by his national governing body of the sport, after a disciplinary hearing in 2021

== Achievements ==
=== All-Africa Games ===
Men's doubles

Year	Venue	Partner	Opponent	Score	Result
2011	Escola Josina Machel, Maputo, Mozambique	(Ghana) Solomon Mensah Nyarko	(South Africa) Dorian James (South Africa) Willem Viljoen	7–21, 13–21	Bronze

=== BWF International Challenge/Series ===
Mixed doubles

Year	Tournament	Partner	Opponent	Score	Result
2015	Nigeria International	(Ghana) Gifty Mensah	(Nigeria) Olorunfemi Elewa (Nigeria) Susan Ideh	19–21, 17–21	(silver) Runner-up

BWF International Challenge tournament
BWF International Series tournament
BWF Future Series tournament
