= 2024 African Badminton Championships =

2024 African Badminton Championships 2024 بطولة أفريقيا للريشة الطائرة
Tournament details
- Dates: 16–18 February
- Edition: 28th
- Venue: Cairo Stadium Hall 4
- Location: Cairo, Egypt

The 2024 African Badminton Championships is the continental badminton championships to crown the best players across Africa. The tournament was held at Cairo Stadium Hall 4 in Cairo, Egypt, from 16 to 18 February 2024.

== Tournament ==
The 2024 African Badminton Championships was a continental tournament to crown the best players in Africa holding from 16 to 18 February.

=== Venue ===
This tournament was held at Cairo Stadium Hall 4 in Cairo with four courts.

=== Point distribution ===
The individual event of this tournament was graded based on the BWF points system for the BWF International Challenge event. Below is the table with the point distribution for each phase of the tournament.

Winner	Runner-up	3/4	5/8	9/16	17/32	33/64	65/128
4,000	3,400	2,800	2,200	1,520	920	360	170

== Medalists ==
Event	Gold	Silver	Bronze
Men's singles	(Nigeria) Anuoluwapo Juwon Opeyori	(Mauritius) Julien Paul	(Egypt) Adham Hatem Elgamal
Men's singles	(Nigeria) Anuoluwapo Juwon Opeyori	(Mauritius) Julien Paul	(Nigeria) Victor Ikechukwu
Women's singles	(Mauritius) Kate Foo Kune	(Uganda) Fadilah Mohamed Rafi	(Uganda) Gladys Mbabazi
Women's singles	(Mauritius) Kate Foo Kune	(Uganda) Fadilah Mohamed Rafi	(South Africa) Johanita Scholtz
Men's doubles	(Algeria) Youcef Sabri Medel (Algeria) Koceila Mammeri	(Nigeria) Nusa Momoh (Nigeria) Godwin Olofua	(Mauritius) Lucas Douce (Mauritius) Khemtish Rai Nundah
Men's doubles	(Algeria) Youcef Sabri Medel (Algeria) Koceila Mammeri	(Nigeria) Nusa Momoh (Nigeria) Godwin Olofua	(Mauritius) Melvin Appiah (Mauritius) Tejraj Pultoo
Women's doubles	(South Africa) Amy Ackerman (South Africa) Deidré Laurens	(Uganda) Husina Kobugabe (Uganda) Gladys Mbabazi	(Nigeria) Dorcas Ajoke Adesokan (Nigeria) Sofiat Arinola Obanishola
Women's doubles	(South Africa) Amy Ackerman (South Africa) Deidré Laurens	(Uganda) Husina Kobugabe (Uganda) Gladys Mbabazi	(Uganda) Fadilah Mohamed Rafi (Uganda) Tracy Naluwooza
Mixed doubles	(Algeria) Koceila Mammeri (Algeria) Tanina Mammeri	(Egypt) Adham Hatem Elgamal (Egypt) Doha Hany	(Mauritius) Julien Paul (Mauritius) Kate Foo Kune
Mixed doubles	(Algeria) Koceila Mammeri (Algeria) Tanina Mammeri	(Egypt) Adham Hatem Elgamal (Egypt) Doha Hany	(Nigeria) Alhaji Aliyu Shehu (Nigeria) Uchechukwu Deborah Ukeh

=== Medal table ===
* Host nation (Egypt)

Rank	Nation	Gold	Silver	Bronze	Total
1	Algeria	2	0	0	2
2	Mauritius	1	1	3	5
2	Nigeria	1	1	3	5
4	South Africa	1	0	1	2
5	Uganda	0	2	2	4
6	Egypt*	0	1	1	2
Totals (6 entries)		5	5	10	20

== Men's singles ==
=== Seeds ===
1. (Nigeria) Anuoluwapo Juwon Opeyori (champion)
2. (Mauritius) Georges Julien Paul (final)
3. (Egypt) Adham Hatem Elgamal (semi-finals)
4. (Algeria) Youcef Sabri Medel (quarter-finals)
5. (South Africa) Caden Kakora (second round)
6. (Algeria) Adel Hamek (quarter-finals)
7. (Zambia) Kalombo Mulenga (third round)
8. (South Africa) Robert Summers (second round)

=== Finals ===
Semi-finals
1	(Nigeria) Anuoluwapo Juwon Opeyori	21	19	21
(Nigeria) Victor Ikechukwu	13	21	9
3	(Egypt) Adham Hatem Elgamal	13	18
2	(Mauritius) Julien Paul	21	21

Final
1	(Nigeria) Anuoluwapo Juwon Opeyori	23	11	21
2	(Mauritius) Julien Paul	21	21	16

=== Top half ===
==== Section 1 ====
First round
(Cameroon) F Kemene	14	3
(Mauritius) J B Bongout	21	21
(Algeria) M A Ouchefoun	21	8	21
(Mauritius) K R Nundah	18	21	17

Second round
1	(Nigeria) A J Opeyori	21	21
(Algeria) S Larbaoui	18	7
A Idlahoucine	11	17
(Mauritius) J B Bongout	21	21
7	(Zambia) K Mulenga	21	21
(Uganda) A Muyanja	10	9
(Egypt) A Salah	16	21	21
(Algeria) M A Ouchefoun	21	15	12

Third round
1	(Nigeria) A J Opeyori	21	21
(Mauritius) J B Bongout	13	11
7	(Zambia) K Mulenga	19	18
(Egypt) A Salah	21	21

Quarter-finals
1	(Nigeria) A J Opeyori	21	21
(Egypt) A Salah	11	11

==== Section 2 ====
First round
(Cameroon) M H Assembe	13	11
(Nigeria) A A Shehu	21	21
(Egypt) M Mostafa Kamel	21	21
(Uganda) M Lubega	12	8

Second round
4	(Algeria) Y S Medel	21	21
(Mauritius) Melvin Appiah	14	16
(Egypt) K Ezzat	21	18	21
(Nigeria) A A Shehu	13	21	16
8	(South Africa) R Summers	21	9	11
(Nigeria) V Ikechukwu	11	21	21
(Zambia) Chongo Mulenga	21	12
(Egypt) M Mostafa Kamel	23	21

Third round
4	(Algeria) Y S Medel	21	22
(Egypt) K Ezzat	17	20
(Nigeria) V Ikechukwu	21	21
(Egypt) M Mostafa Kamel	19	15

Quarter-finals
4	(Algeria) Y S Medel	19	21
(Nigeria) V Ikechukwu	21	23

=== Bottom half ===
==== Section 3 ====
First round
(Uganda) A Owinyi	21	15	21
(Zambia) T Kafunda	15	21	19
(Mauritius) L Douce	15	10
(Nigeria) J Emmanuel Emmy	21	21

Second round
(Uganda) A Owinyi	21	21
(Cameroon) P C Assembe Voundi	9	15
(Equatorial Guinea) S Obiegue	14	21
6	(Algeria) A Hamek	21	23
(Nigeria) J Emmanuel Emmy	21	21
(Zimbabwe) T Mathe	9	3
(Zambia) R Mwansa	8	11
3	(Egypt) A H Elgamal	21	21

Third round
(Uganda) A Owinyi	14	17
6	(Algeria) A Hamek	21	21
(Nigeria) J Emmanuel Emmy	11	18
3	(Egypt) A H Elgamal	21	21

Quarter-finals
6	(Algeria) A Hamek	13	9^{r}
3	(Egypt) A H Elgamal	21	18

==== Section 4 ====
First round
(Egypt) A Elbahnasawy	24	23	10
(Algeria) M A Belarbi	26	21	21
(Egypt) A Abdelhakim	21	21
(Uganda) E Emuddu	19	14

Second round
(Algeria) M A Belarbi	5	21	20
(Nigeria) G Olofua	21	16	22
D Bourroum	21	19	21
5	(South Africa) C Kakora	11	21	9
(Egypt) A Abdelhakim	7
(Zambia) M Chisela	2^{r}
(Seychelles) J Luo	10	7
2	(Mauritius) J Paul	21	21

Third round
(Nigeria) G Olofua	21	12
D Bourroum	23	21
(Egypt) A Abdelhakim	12	16
2	(Mauritius) J Paul	21	21

Quarter-finals
D Bourroum	22	15	15
2	(Mauritius) J Paul	20	21	21

== Women's singles ==
=== Seeds ===
1. (Uganda) Fadilah Shamika Mohamed Rafi (final)
2. (South Africa) Johanita Scholtz (semi-finals)
3. (Egypt) Nour Ahmed Youssri (first round)
4. (Uganda) Husina Kobugabe (first round)

=== Finals ===
Semi-finals
1	(Uganda) Fadilah Shamika Mohamed Rafi	21	9	21
(Uganda) Gladys Mbabazi	19	21	10
(Mauritius) Kate Foo Kune	22	21
2	(South Africa) Johanita Scholtz	20	19

Final
1	(Uganda) Fadilah Shamika Mohamed Rafi
(Mauritius) Kate Foo Kune	w	/	o

=== Top half ===
==== Section 1 ====
First round
(Egypt) H Tarek	21	21
(Mauritius) L Bodha	11	9
(Algeria) M Ouchefoun	21	21
(Cameroon) M P G Anamba	10	10
(South Africa) D Olivier	5	6
(Nigeria) U D Ukeh	21	21

Second round
1	(Uganda) F S Mohamed Rafi	14	21	21
(Egypt) H Tarek	21	10	8
(Algeria) M Ouchefoun	21	21
(Nigeria) U D Ukeh	12	11

Quarter-finals
1	(Uganda) F S Mohamed Rafi	21	21
(Algeria) M Ouchefoun	13	12

==== Section 2 ====
First round
3	(Egypt) N Ahmed Youssri	21	12	19
(Uganda) G Mbabazi	18	21	21
(Mauritius) T Bhurtun	18	9
(Algeria) Celia M	21	21
(Cameroon) S M Avidi Meka	10	12
(Egypt) K M Rabie	21	21
(Algeria) L Mazri	21	16	13
(Nigeria) Z D Alabi	14	21	21

Second round
(Uganda) G Mbabazi	21	21
(Algeria) Celia M	11	10
(Egypt) K M Rabie	22	22	21
(Nigeria) Z D Alabi	24	20	13

Quarter-finals
(Uganda) G Mbabazi	21	21
(Egypt) K M Rabie	16	12

=== Bottom half ===
==== Section 3 ====
First round
(Egypt) R Eladawy	21	21
(Cameroon) M C L Akoumba Ze	8	8
(Nigeria) C O Obasanmi	21	18	21
(Mauritius) H H Chiara Kate	16	21	12
(Nigeria) S A Obanishola	21	21	13
(Algeria) Y Chibah	9	23	21
(Mauritius) K Foo Kune	21	21
4	(Uganda) H Kobugabe	14	13

Second round
(Egypt) R Eladawy	21	21
(Nigeria) C O Obasanmi	9	11
(Algeria) Y Chibah	16	12
(Mauritius) K Foo Kune	21	21

Quarter-finals
(Egypt) R Eladawy	10	7
(Mauritius) K Foo Kune	21	21

==== Section 4 ====
First round
(Mauritius) K Dookhee	9	10
(Algeria) H Bouksani	21	21
(Egypt) D Hany	21	21
(Uganda) T Naluwooza	15	17
(Cameroon) K Diack Woti	9	9
(Egypt) J Abdelkader	21	21
(Nigeria) D A Adesokan	12	13
2	(South Africa) J Scholtz	21	21

Second round
(Algeria) H Bouksani	19	13
(Egypt) D Hany	21	21
(Egypt) J Abdelkader	15	13
2	(South Africa) J Scholtz	21	21

Quarter-finals
(Egypt) D Hany	15	11
2	(South Africa) J Scholtz	21	21

== Men's doubles ==
=== Seeds ===
1. (Algeria) Koceila Mammeri / Youcef Sabri Medel (champions)
2. (Algeria) Mohamed Abderrahime Belarbi / Adel Hamek (second round)
3. (South Africa) Jarred Elliott / Robert Summers (quarter-finals)
4. (Mauritius) Lucas Douce / Khemtish Rai Nundah (semi-finals)

=== Finals ===
Semi-finals
1	(Algeria) Koceila Mammeri (Algeria) Youcef Sabri Medel	21	21
4	(Mauritius) Lucas Douce (Mauritius) Khemtish Rai Nundah	10	15
(Mauritius) Melvin Appiah (Mauritius) Tejraj Pultoo	17	15
(Nigeria) Momoh Nusa (Nigeria) Godwin Olofua	21	21

Final
1	(Algeria) Koceila Mammeri (Algeria) Youcef Sabri Medel	21	21
(Nigeria) Momoh Nusa (Nigeria) Godwin Olofua	12	8

=== Top half ===
==== Section 1 ====
First round

Second round
1	(Algeria) K Mammeri (Algeria) Y S Medel	21	21
(Uganda) E Emuddu (Uganda) A Owinyi	9	9
(Nigeria) J Emmanuel Emmy (Nigeria) V Ikechukwu	15	21	21
(South Africa) C Coetzer (South Africa) C Kakora	21	11	19

Quarter-finals
1	(Algeria) K Mammeri (Algeria) Y S Medel	21	21
(Nigeria) J Emmanuel Emmy (Nigeria) V Ikechukwu	7	18

==== Section 2 ====
First round

Second round
4	(Mauritius) L Douce (Mauritius) K R Nundah	w	/	o
(Zambia) M Chisela (Zambia) T Kafunda
(Egypt) A Elbahnasawy (Egypt) K Ezzat	21	21
(Cameroon) P C Assembe Voundi (Cameroon) F D Nkonomo Bengono	9	9

Quarter-finals
4	(Mauritius) L Douce (Mauritius) K R Nundah	21	16	21
(Egypt) A Elbahnasawy (Egypt) K Ezzat	19	21	19

=== Bottom half ===
==== Section 3 ====
First round
(Mauritius) M Appiah (Mauritius) T Pultoo	21	21
(Egypt) A Abdelsattar (Egypt) A Ashraf	17	16

Second round
(Mauritius) M Appiah (Mauritius) T Pultoo	21	21
(Cameroon) M H Assembe (Cameroon) F Kemene	9	12
(Uganda) M Lubega (Uganda) A Muyanja	8	15
3	(South Africa) J Elliott (South Africa) R Summers	21	21

Quarter-finals
(Mauritius) M Appiah (Mauritius) T Pultoo	21	17	21
3	(South Africa) J Elliott (South Africa) R Summers	19	21	12

==== Section 4 ====
First round

Second round
(Egypt) A Abdelhakim (Egypt) A Salah	18	19
(Zambia) C Mulenga (Zambia) K Mulenga	21	21
(Nigeria) M Nusa (Nigeria) G Olofua	16	21	21
2	(Algeria) M A Belarbi (Algeria) A Hamek	21	10	11

Quarter-finals
(Zambia) C Mulenga (Zambia) K Mulenga	18	11
(Nigeria) M Nusa (Nigeria) G Olofua	21	21

== Women's doubles ==
=== Seeds ===
1. (South Africa) Amy Ackerman / Deidre Laurens (champions)
2. (Uganda) Husina Kobugabe / Gladys Mbabazi (final)

=== Bracket ===
First round
(Nigeria) Z D Alabi (Nigeria) R Yakubu	15	21	15
(Algeria) H Bouksani (Algeria) T Mammeri	21	19	21
(Cameroon) M C L Akoumba Ze (Cameroon) M P G Anamba	17	21	19
(Mauritius) V Appiah (Mauritius) T Bhurtun	21	18	21
(Uganda) F S Mohamed Rafi (Uganda) T Naluwooza	21	16	21
(Egypt) N Ahmed Youssri (Egypt) D Hany	12	21	19
(Cameroon) S M Avidi Meka (Cameroon) K Diack Woti	9	11
(Egypt) R Eladawy (Egypt) H Tarek	21	21
(Mauritius) L Bodha (Mauritius) K Dookhee	20	18
(Nigeria) D A Adesokan (Nigeria) S A Obanishola	22	21
(South Africa) M de Beer (South Africa) J Scholtz	17	21	21
(Algeria) Y Chibah (Algeria) L Mazri	21	19	19
(Egypt) J Abdelkader (Egypt) K M Rabie	18	20
2	(Uganda) H Kobugabe (Uganda) G Mbabazi	21	22

Quarter-finals
1	(South Africa) A Ackerman (South Africa) D Laurens	21	21
(Algeria) H Bouksani (Algeria) T Mammeri	12	16
(Mauritius) V Appiah (Mauritius) T Bhurtun	13	16
(Uganda) F S Mohamed Rafi (Uganda) T Naluwooza	21	21
(Egypt) R Eladawy (Egypt) H Tarek	1	8
(Nigeria) D A Adesokan (Nigeria) S A Obanishola	21	21
(South Africa) M de Beer (South Africa) J Scholtz	19	15
2	(Uganda) H Kobugabe (Uganda) G Mbabazi	21	21

Semi-finals
1	(South Africa) A Ackerman (South Africa) D Laurens	w	/	o
(Uganda) F S Mohamed Rafi (Uganda) T Naluwooza	w	/	d
(Nigeria) D A Adesokan (Nigeria) S A Obanishola	21	19	18
2	(Uganda) H Kobugabe (Uganda) G Mbabazi	18	21	21

Final
1	(South Africa) A Ackerman (South Africa) D Laurens	21	21
2	(Uganda) H Kobugabe (Uganda) G Mbabazi	11	15

== Mixed doubles ==
=== Seeds ===
1. (Algeria) Koceila Mammeri / Tanina Violette Mammeri (champions)
2. (Egypt) Adham Hatem Elgamal / Doha Hany (final)
3. (Mauritius) Julien Paul / Kate Foo Kune (semi-finals)
4. (South Africa) Jarred Elliott / Amy Ackerman (quarter-finals)

=== Finals ===
Semi-finals
1	(Algeria) Koceila Mammeri (Algeria) Tanina Mammeri	21	21
3	(Mauritius) Julien Paul (Mauritius) Kate Foo Kune	6	11
(Nigeria) Alhaji Aliyu Shehu (Nigeria) Uchechukwu Deborah Ukeh	9	12
2	(Egypt) Adham Hatem Elgamal (Egypt) Doha Hany	21	21

Final
1	(Algeria) Koceila Mammeri (Algeria) Tanina Mammeri	21	21	21
2	(Egypt) Adham Hatem Elgamal (Egypt) Doha Hany	23	16	11

=== Top half ===
==== Section 1 ====
First round
(Cameroon) F M Kemene Atangana (Cameroon) M C L Akoumba Ze	12	11
(South Africa) R Summers (South Africa) M de Beer	21	21

Second round
1	(South Africa) K Mammeri (South Africa) T Mammeri	21	21
(Uganda) E Emuddu (Uganda) T Naluwooza	11	6
(Egypt) A Salah (Egypt) H Tarek	21	21
(South Africa) R Summers (South Africa) M de Beer	15	17

Quarter-finals
1	(Algeria) K Mammeri (Algeria) T Mammeri	21	21
(Egypt) A Salah (Egypt) H Tarek	6	12

==== Section 2 ====
First round
(South Africa) C Coetzer (South Africa) D Olivier	21	21
(Egypt) K Ezzat (Egypt) N Ahmed Youssri	19	19

Second round
3	(Mauritius) J Paul (Mauritius) K Foo Kune	21	21
(Cameroon) P C Assembe Voundi (Cameroon) S M Avidi Meka	8	14
(Nigeria) M Nusa (Nigeria) R Yakubu	21	21
(South Africa) C Coetzer (South Africa) D Olivier	14	10

Quarter-finals
3	(Mauritius) J Paul (Mauritius) K Foo Kune	21	21
(Nigeria) M Nusa (Nigeria) R Yakubu	11	17

=== Bottom half ===
==== Section 3 ====
First round
(Mauritius) M Appiah (Mauritius) V Appiah	26	20	16
(Nigeria) A A Shehu (Nigeria) U D Ukeh	24	22	21
(Egypt) A Elbahnasawy (Egypt) R Eladawy	21	21
(Uganda) M Lubega (Uganda) H Kobugabe	19	19

Second round
(Nigeria) A A Shehu (Nigeria) U D Ukeh	21	21
(Algeria) M A Ouchefoun (Algeria) M Ouchefoun	18	12
(Egypt) A Elbahnasawy (Egypt) R Eladawy	13	8
4	(South Africa) J Elliott (South Africa) A Ackerman	21	21

Quarter-finals
(Nigeria) A A Shehu (Nigeria) U D Ukeh	23	21
4	(South Africa) J Elliott (South Africa) A Ackerman	21	17

==== Section 4 ====
First round
(Uganda) A Owinyi (Uganda) G Mbabazi	14	16
(Algeria) S Larbaoui (Algeria) M Celia	21	21

Second round
(Algeria) S Larbaoui (Algeria) M Celia	21	21
(Cameroon) M H Assembe (Cameroon) M P G Anamba	9	12
(Mauritius) K R Nundah (Mauritius) T Bhurtun	10	10
2	(Egypt) A H Elgamal (Egypt) D Hany	21	21

Quarter-finals
(Algeria) S Larbaoui (Algeria) M Celia	14	6
2	(Egypt) A H Elgamal (Egypt) D Hany	21	21
