= 2026 African Badminton Championships =

Tournament details
- Dates: 13–15 February
- Venue: Royal Aria
- Location: Gaborone, Botswana

Champions
- Men's singles: (Egypt) Adham Hatem Elgamal
- Women's singles: (Uganda) Fadilah Mohamed Rafi
- Men's doubles: (Algeria) Koceila Mammeri (Algeria) Youcef Sabri Medel
- Women's doubles: (South Africa) Amy Ackerman (South Africa) Johanita Scholtz
- Mixed doubles: (Algeria) Koceila Mammeri (Algeria) Tanina Mammeri

The 2026 African Badminton Championships was the continental badminton championships to crown the best players across Africa. The tournament was held at the Royal Aria in Gaborone, Botswana, from 13 to 15 February 2026.

== Tournament ==
The 2026 African Badminton Championships is organized by Botswana Badminton Association.

=== Venue ===
The tournament was held at the Royal Aria, Tlokweng, Gaborone, Botswana.

=== Point distribution ===
The individual event of this tournament was graded based on the BWF points system for the BWF International Challenge event. Below is the table with the point distribution for each phase of the tournament.

Winner	Runner-up	3/4	5/8	9/16	17/32	33/64	65/128
4,000	3,400	2,800	2,200	1,520	920	360	170

== Medal summary ==
=== Medalists ===
Event	Gold	Silver	Bronze
Men's singles	(Egypt) Adham Hatem Elgamal	(Mauritius) Jean Bernard Bongout	(Mauritius) Julien Paul
Men's singles	(Egypt) Adham Hatem Elgamal	(Mauritius) Jean Bernard Bongout	(Mauritius) Lucas Douce
Women's singles	(Uganda) Fadilah Mohamed Rafi	(South Africa) Johanita Scholtz	(Algeria) Yasmina Chibah
Women's singles	(Uganda) Fadilah Mohamed Rafi	(South Africa) Johanita Scholtz	(Egypt) Nour Ahmed Youssri
Men's doubles	(Algeria) Koceila Mammeri (Algeria) Youcef Sabri Medel	(Zambia) Chongo Mulenga (Zambia) Kalombo Mulenga	(Mauritius) Jean Bernard Bongout (Mauritius) Julien Paul
Men's doubles	(Algeria) Koceila Mammeri (Algeria) Youcef Sabri Medel	(Zambia) Chongo Mulenga (Zambia) Kalombo Mulenga	(Egypt) Ahmed Elbahnasawy (Egypt) Kareem Ezzat
Women's doubles	(South Africa) Amy Ackerman (South Africa) Johanita Scholtz	(Egypt) Nour Ahmed Youssri (Egypt) Doha Hany	(Uganda) Fadilah Mohamed Rafi (Uganda) Tracy Naluwooza
Women's doubles	(South Africa) Amy Ackerman (South Africa) Johanita Scholtz	(Egypt) Nour Ahmed Youssri (Egypt) Doha Hany	(Algeria) Yasmina Chibah (Algeria) Linda Mazri
Mixed doubles	(Algeria) Koceila Mammeri (Algeria) Tanina Mammeri	(South Africa) Caden Kakora (South Africa) Amy Ackerman	(Nigeria) Saidu Aliyu (Nigeria) Olajumoke Obasanmi
Mixed doubles	(Algeria) Koceila Mammeri (Algeria) Tanina Mammeri	(South Africa) Caden Kakora (South Africa) Amy Ackerman	(Egypt) Adham Hatem Elgamal (Egypt) Doha Hany

=== Medal table ===
* Host nation (Botswana)

Rank	Nation	Gold	Silver	Bronze	Total
1	Algeria	2	0	2	4
2	South Africa	1	2	0	3
3	Egypt	1	1	3	5
4	Uganda	1	0	1	2
5	Mauritius	0	1	3	4
6	Zambia	0	1	0	1
7	Nigeria	0	0	1	1
Totals (7 entries)		5	5	10	20

== Men's singles ==
=== Seeds ===
1. Driss Bourroum (quarter-finals)
2. (Egypt) Adham Hatem Elgamal (champion)
3. (Mauritius) Lucas Douce (semi-finals)
4. (Mauritius) Julien Paul (semi-finals)
5. (Algeria) Adel Hamek (quarter-finals)
6. (Zambia) Kalombo Mulenga (quarter-finals)
7. (South Africa) Caden Kakora (quarter-finals)
8. (Mauritius) Jean Bernard Bongout (final)
9. (Egypt) Kareem Ezzat (fourth round)
10. (Algeria) Mohamed Abderrahime Belarbi (third round)
11. (Uganda) Muzafaru Lubega (fourth round)
12. (Zambia) Chongo Mulenga (second round)
13. (Mauritius) Khemtish Nundah (third round)
14. (Madagascar) Lalaïna Ramanana-Rahary (third round)
15. (Algeria) Mohamed Abdelaziz Ouchefoun (third round)
16. (Uganda) Reagan Michael Nsubuga (fourth round)

=== Finals ===
Quarter-finals
1	Driss Bourroum	17	18
8	(Mauritius) Jean Bernard Bongout	21	21
4	(Mauritius) Julien Paul	21	22	21
7	(South Africa) Caden Kakora	8	24	18
6	(Zambia) Kalombo Mulenga	11	18
3	(Mauritius) Lucas Douce	21	21
5	(Algeria) Adel Hamek	26	11	19
2	(Egypt) Adham Hatem Elgamal	24	21	21

Semi-finals
8	(Mauritius) Jean Bernard Bongout	21	21
4	(Mauritius) Julien Paul	8	8
3	(Mauritius) Lucas Douce	14	13
2	(Egypt) Adham Hatem Elgamal	21	21

Final
8	(Mauritius) Jean Bernard Bongout	1^{r}
2	(Egypt) Adham Hatem Elgamal	2

=== Top half ===
==== Section 1 ====
First round
E Akwanyi	14	21	13
(Ghana) A Abdul-Samad	21	15	21

Second round
1	D Bourroum	21	21
(Cameroon) P C Assembe Voundi	7	8
(South Africa) A Phillips	21	21
(Madagascar) H Rakotoherinivo	10	7
9	(Egypt) K Ezzat	21	21
(Lesotho) R Sehole	1	4
(Ivory Coast) Y M Kangah	15	11
(Ghana) A Abdul-Samad	21	21

Third round
1	D Bourroum	21	21
(South Africa) A Phillips	19	15
9	(Egypt) K Ezzat	21	21
(Ghana) A Abdul-Samad	13	15

Fourth round
1	D Bourroum	21	21
9	(Egypt) K Ezzat	11	6

==== Section 2 ====
First round
(Nigeria) A Samuel	21	21
(Algeria) O Keddou	16	9

Second round
8	(Mauritius) J B Bongout	21	21
(Zimbabwe) B Mahwire	8	5
(Egypt) A Abdelsattar	21	21
(Ghana) F Obeng-Shang	10	9
12	(Zambia) C Mulenga	19	12
(Uganda) A Oduka	21	21
(Botswana) T Perekisi	17	10
(Nigeria) A Samuel	21	21

Third round
8	(Mauritius) J B Bongout	21	21
(Egypt) A Abdelsattar	12	17
(Uganda) A Oduka	10	20
(Nigeria) A Samuel	21	22

Fourth round
8	(Mauritius) J B Bongout	21	21
(Nigeria) A Samuel	10	2

==== Section 3 ====
First round
(Lesotho) L Matlosa	5	5
(Nigeria) U Mustapha	21	21
(Ghana) R T Tetteh	21	21
(Cameroon) F D N Bengono	17	13

Second round
4	(Mauritius) J Paul	21	21
(Democratic Republic of the Congo) R B Mabele	8	10
(Botswana) T Kabomo	19	24
(Nigeria) U Mustapha	21	26
16	(Uganda) R M Nsubuga	21	21
(Seychelles) D Bedier	14	15
(Zambia) R Mwansa	18	21	21
(Ghana) R T Tetteh	21	9	13

Third round
4	(Mauritius) J Paul	21	18	21
(Nigeria) U Mustapha	11	21	18
16	(Uganda) R M Nsubuga	15	21	23
(Zambia) R Mwansa	21	17	21

Fourth round
4	(Mauritius) J Paul	21	21
16	(Uganda) R M Nsubuga	10	9

==== Section 4 ====
First round
(Lesotho) K Mohapi	5	7
(Nigeria) I D Ahmed	21	21
(Zimbabwe) A Bonde	9	8
(Egypt) A Elbahnasawy	21	21

Second round
7	(South Africa) C Kakora	21	21
(Burundi) K Kwizera	4	5
(Madagascar) A Razakasoavina	5	6
(Nigeria) I D Ahmed	21	21
10	(Algeria) M A Belarbi	21	21
(Ivory Coast) J I Agnimel	11	13
D Wafula	11	15
(Egypt) A Elbahnasawy	21	21

Third round
7	(South Africa) C Kakora	21	21
(Nigeria) I D Ahmed	14	18
10	(Algeria) M A Belarbi	17	5
(Egypt) A Elbahnasawy	21	21

Fourth round
7	(South Africa) C Kakora	21	21
(Egypt) A Elbahnasawy	13	17

=== Bottom half ===
==== Section 5 ====
First round
J Gitau	21	21
(Ghana) S K Adogley	3	3
(Uganda) A T Kibirige	21	21
(Ivory Coast) L Kpangni	13	9

Second round
J Gitau	9	10
(Egypt) M M Kamel	21	21
(Lesotho) M Maleke	6	4
14	(Madagascar) L Ramanana-Rahary	21	21
(Uganda) A T Kibirige	21	21
(Botswana) T K Kgosidialwa	13	11
(Seychelles) J Raguin	3	3
6	(Zambia) K Mulenga	21	21

Third round
(Egypt) M M Kamel	21	17	21
14	(Madagascar) L Ramanana-Rahary	17	21	14
(Uganda) A T Kibirige	21	6	9
6	(Zambia) K Mulenga	12	21	21

Fourth round
(Egypt) M M Kamel	16	9
6	(Zambia) K Mulenga	21	21

==== Section 6 ====
First round
(Nigeria) J Abel	21	21
(Botswana) T Moilwa	12	6
(Uganda) D Mukasa	21	21
(Cameroon) J M F Evina	14	15

Second round
(Nigeria) J Abel	21	21
(Zimbabwe) T Chipumho	10	15
(South Africa) M Vigario	9	16
15	(Algeria) M A Ouchefoun	21	21
(Uganda) D Mukasa	21	21
(Zambia) W Kafunda	14	17
S Sikoyo	16	16
3	(Mauritius) L Douce	21	21

Third round
(Nigeria) J Abel	15	21	21
15	(Algeria) M A Ouchefoun	21	15	8
(Uganda) D Mukasa	9	9
3	(Mauritius) L Douce	21	21

Fourth round
(Nigeria) J Abel	16	13
3	(Mauritius) L Douce	21	21

==== Section 7 ====
First round
(Ghana) E Korampong	9	13
(Nigeria) A A Shehu	21	21
(South Africa) R Vigario	21	22
K Ongaki	15	20

Second round
(Nigeria) A A Shehu	21	21
(Ivory Coast) Y E I Bledou	11	4
(Democratic Republic of the Congo) Z Wayi	4	13
13	(Mauritius) K R Nundah	21	21
(South Africa) R Vigario	14	21	14
(Botswana) G Kethabanetswe	21	17	21
(Madagascar) T Razafimandimby	10	14
5	(Algeria) A Hamek	21	21

Third round
(Nigeria) A A Shehu	21	21
13	(Mauritius) K R Nundah	12	19
(Botswana) G Kethabanetswe	9	13
5	(Algeria) A Hamek	21	21

Fourth round
(Nigeria) A A Shehu	17	17
5	(Algeria) A Hamek	21	21

==== Section 8 ====
First round
(Zimbabwe) T Mathe	21	21
(Burundi) P-A Munezero	4	15

Second round
(Zimbabwe) T Mathe	21	21
(Cameroon) P Nolem	12	15
(Zambia) T Kafunda	18	12
11	(Uganda) M Lubega	21	21
(Seychelles) Y Didon	23	9
(South Africa) M Bredell	21	21
(Lesotho) N Rahlolo	4	4
2	(Egypt) A H Elgamal	21	21

Third round
(Zimbabwe) T Mathe	21	17	17
11	(Uganda) M Lubega	12	21	21
(South Africa) M Bredell	10	17
2	(Egypt) A H Elgamal	21	21

Fourth round
11	(Uganda) M Lubega	10	11
2	(Egypt) A H Elgamal	21	21

== Women's singles ==
=== Seeds ===
1. (Uganda) Fadilah Mohamed Rafi (champion)
2. (Egypt) Nour Ahmed Youssri (semi-finals)
3. (Egypt) Doha Hany (third round)
4. (South Africa) Johanita Scholtz (final)
5. (Uganda) Gladys Mbabazi (third round)
6. Saumya Gupta (quarter-finals)
7. (Nigeria) Chineye Ibere (third round)
8. (Uganda) Kruthum Nalumansi (second round)

=== Finals ===
Semi-finals
1	(Uganda) Fadilah Mohamed Rafi	16	21	21
(Algeria) Yasmina Chibah	21	13	15
4	(South Africa) Johanita Scholtz	18	23	21
2	(Egypt) Nour Ahmed Youssri	21	21	14

Final
1	(Uganda) Fadilah Mohamed Rafi	21	16	21
4	(South Africa) Johanita Scholtz	17	21	19

=== Top half ===
==== Section 1 ====
First round
(Seychelles) L Bedier	21	21
(Lesotho) T Talejane	8	10
(South Africa) C Lai	11	7
(Egypt) F Rabie	21	21
(Ivory Coast) A Lekpehi	12	12
N Wandili	21	21
(Mauritius) E How Hong	21	21
(Cameroon) M P Ngo Hiol	11	14
(Zambia) E Siamupangila	21	21
(Zimbabwe) N T Sibanda	9	16

Second round
1	(Uganda) F S Mohamed Rafi	21	21
(Seychelles) L Bedier	2	4
B Buyanzi	7	9
(Egypt) F Rabie	21	21
7	(Nigeria) R C Ebere	21	21
N Wandili	6	13
(Mauritius) E How Hong	21	21
(Zambia) E Siamupangila	9	6

Third round
1	(Uganda) F S Mohamed Rafi	21	21
(Egypt) F Rabie	16	19
7	(Nigeria) R C Ebere	21	10	12
(Mauritius) E How Hong	15	21	21

Quarter-finals
1	(Uganda) F S Mohamed Rafi	21	17	21
(Mauritius) E How Hong	18	21	13

==== Section 2 ====
First round
J N Sengera	21	21
(Uganda) O Nakajja	10	19
(Botswana) T Willie	9	8
(Algeria) Y Chibah	21	21
(Lesotho) K Khetheng	5	2
(Mauritius) C How Hong	21	21
(Zambia) M Chilambe	4	3
(South Africa) E de Villiers	21	21
(Zimbabwe) F L Oliviero	7	2
(Nigeria) Z D Alabi	21	21

Second round
3	(Egypt) D Hany	21	21
J N Sengera	11	6
(Cameroon) M C L Akoumba Ze	13	6
(Algeria) Y Chibah	21	21
8	(Uganda) K Nalumansi	15	14
(Mauritius) C How Hong	21	21
(South Africa) E de Villiers	21	20	21
(Nigeria) Z D Alabi	16	22	10

Third round
3	(Egypt) D Hany	18	21	16
(Algeria) Y Chibah	21	14	21
(Mauritius) C How Hong	21	18	21
(South Africa) E de Villiers	11	21	17

Quarter-finals
(Algeria) Y Chibah	21	21
(Mauritius) C How Hong	18	15

=== Bottom half ===
==== Section 3 ====
First round
(Mauritius) T Bhurtun	21	21
(Uganda) T Naluwooza	14	15
(Egypt) H T Zaher	21	21
(Algeria) M Ouchefoun	18	19
(Nigeria) O F Ifeloluwa	21	21
(Lesotho) L Matlosa	8	9
(Cameroon) P R E Eyono	12	9
(Botswana) T Kabelo	21	21
(Zimbabwe) V T Samuriwo	9	15
(Zambia) E Mwansa	21	21

Second round
(Mauritius) T Bhurtun	20	21	21
(Egypt) H T Zaher	22	9	15
(Nigeria) O F Ifeloluwa	13	10
6	S Gupta	21	21
(Botswana) T Kabelo	9	13
(Egypt) M Mohamed	21	21
(Zambia) E Mwansa	4	2
4	(South Africa) J Scholtz	21	21

Third round
(Mauritius) T Bhurtun	21	13
6	S Gupta	23	21
(Egypt) M Mohamed	19	21	11
4	(South Africa) J Scholtz	21	11	21

Quarter-finals
6	S Gupta	11	11
4	(South Africa) J Scholtz	21	21

==== Section 4 ====
First round
(Zambia) M Kalandanya	10	7
(Nigeria) S A Obanishola	21	21
(Lesotho) K Moeletsi	6	5
(Mauritius) A Jean-Louis	21	21
(Algeria) H Bouksani	22	21
(Cameroon) M P G Anamba	20	17
(Nigeria) J P Tunze	21	21
(Zimbabwe) S T Sibanda	4	8
Y Mwikali	19	21	16
(Botswana) T Ndzinge	21	19	21

Second round
(Nigeria) S A Obanishola	21	21
(Mauritius) A Jean-Louis	6	8
(Algeria) H Bouksani	24	21	17
5	(Uganda) G Mbabazi	26	18	21
(Nigeria) J P Tunze	19	16
(Mauritius) L L Chiniah	21	21
(Botswana) T Ndzinge	2	10
2	(Egypt) N A Youssri	21	21

Third round
(Nigeria) S A Obanishola	21	21
5	(Uganda) G Mbabazi	17	18
(Mauritius) L L Chiniah	12	14
2	(Egypt) N A Youssri	21	21

Quarter-finals
(Nigeria) S A Obanishola	9	15
2	(Egypt) N A Youssri	21	21

== Men's doubles ==
=== Seeds ===
1. (Algeria) Koceila Mammeri / Youcef Sabri Medel (champions)
2. (Algeria) Mohamed Abderrahime Belarbi / Adel Hamek (quarter-finals)
3. (Zambia) Chongo Mulenga / Kalombo Mulenga (final)
4. (Mauritius) Jean Bernard Bongout / Julien Paul (semi-finals)
5. (Egypt) Ahmed Elbahnasawy / Kareem Ezzat (semi-finals)
6. (South Africa) Caden Kakora / Anthony Phillips (quarter-finals)
7. (Nigeria) Joseph Abel / Alhaji Aliyu Shehu (third round)
8. (Uganda) Muzafaru Lubega / Reagan Nsubuga (second round)

=== Finals ===
Semi-finals
1	(Algeria) Koceila Mammeri (Algeria) Youcef Sabri Medel	21	21
4	(Mauritius) Jean Bernard Bongout (Mauritius) Julien Paul	16	8
3	(Zambia) Chongo Mulenga (Zambia) Kalombo Mulenga	21	15	21
5	(Egypt) Ahmed Elbahnasawy (Egypt) Kareem Ezzat	16	21	10

Final
1	(Algeria) Koceila Mammeri (Algeria) Youcef Sabri Medel	21	21
3	(Zambia) Chongo Mulenga (Zambia) Kalombo Mulenga	16	19

=== Top half ===
==== Section 1 ====
First round

Second round
1	(Algeria) K Mammeri (Algeria) Y S Medel	21	21
(Ghana) A Abdul-Samad (Ghana) R T Tetteh	14	15
(Madagascar) L Ramanana-Rahary (Madagascar) R Tokinirina	22	21
(Cameroon) P C Assembe Voundi (Cameroon) F D Nkonomo Bengono	20	15
6	(South Africa) C Kakora (South Africa) A Phillips	21	22	21
(Zambia) E Mwanza (Zambia) T Kafunda	10	24	9
(Ivory Coast) A J I Agnimel (Ivory Coast) Y E I Bledou	21	21
(Lesotho) M Maleke (Lesotho) K Mohapi	10	10

Third round
1	(Algeria) K Mammeri (Algeria) Y S Medel	21	21
(Madagascar) L Ramanana-Rahary (Madagascar) R Tokinirina	12	9
6	(South Africa) C Kakora (South Africa) A Phillips	21	21
(Ivory Coast) J I Agnimel (Ivory Coast) Y E I Bledou	8	6

Quarter-finals
1	(Algeria) K Mammeri (Algeria) Y S Medel	21	21
6	(South Africa) C Kakora (South Africa) A Phillips	8	18

==== Section 2 ====
First round

Second round
4	(Mauritius) J B Bongout (Mauritius) J Paul	21	21
M J Githitu; P Kinyua	16	9
(Botswana) T Moilwa (Botswana) P Tshepo	14	17
(Egypt) A Abdelsattar (Egypt) S Omar	21	21
8	(Uganda) M Lubega (Uganda) R M Nsubuga	5	19
(Nigeria) I D Ahmed (Nigeria) S Aliyu	21	21
(Zimbabwe) T Chipumho (Zimbabwe) B Mahwire	21	16	16
(Seychelles) Y Didon (Seychelles) J Renaud	17	21	21

Third round
4	(Mauritius) J B Bongout (Mauritius) J Paul	20	21	21
(Egypt) A Abdelsattar (Egypt) S Omar	22	13	19
(Nigeria) I D Ahmed (Nigeria) S Aliyu	21	21
(Seychelles) Y Didon (Seychelles) J Renaud	10	13

Quarter-finals
4	(Mauritius) J B Bongout (Mauritius) J Paul	10	27	21
(Nigeria) I D Ahmed (Nigeria) S Aliyu	21	25	18

=== Bottom half ===
==== Section 3 ====
First round
(Botswana) G Kethabanetswe (Botswana) T Kabomo	21	21
(Democratic Republic of the Congo) R B Mabele (Democratic Republic of the Congo) Z Wayi	10	8

Second round
(Botswana) G Kethabanetswe (Botswana) T Kabomo	19	15
(Mauritius) L Douce (Mauritius) K R Nundah	21	21
(Burundi) K Kwizera (Burundi) P-A Munezero	6	3
7	(Nigeria) J Abel (Nigeria) A A Shehu	21	21
(Ghana) S K Adogley (Ghana) E Korampong	21	15	21
(Madagascar) H Rakotoherinivo (Madagascar) A Razakasoavina	12	21	14
(Cameroon) J M F Evina (Cameroon) P Nolem	9	8
3	(Zambia) C Mulenga (Zambia) K Mulenga	21	21

Third round
(Mauritius) L Douce (Mauritius) K R Nundah	14	21	21
7	(Nigeria) J Abel (Nigeria) A A Shehu	21	12	18
(Ghana) S K Adogley (Ghana) E Korampong	4	11
3	(Zambia) C Mulenga (Zambia) K Mulenga	21	21

Quarter-finals
(Mauritius) L Douce (Mauritius) K R Nundah	17	15
3	(Zambia) C Mulenga (Zambia) K Mulenga	21	21

==== Section 4 ====
First round

Second round
(Lesotho) N Rahlolo (Lesotho) R Sehole	4	13
(Uganda) A T Kibirige (Uganda) A Oduka	21	21
(Seychelles) D Bedier (Seychelles) J Raguin	8	10
5	(Egypt) A Elbahnasawy (Egypt) K Ezzat	21	21
J Gitau; D Wafula	21	21
(Ivory Coast) Y M Kangah (Ivory Coast) L Kpangni	3	4
(South Africa) M Vigario (South Africa) R Vigario	14	21	18
2	(Algeria) M A Belarbi (Algeria) A Hamek	21	12	21

Third round
(Uganda) A T Kibirige (Uganda) A Oduka	8	14
5	(Egypt) A Elbahnasawy (Egypt) K Ezzat	21	21
J Gitau; D Wafula	11	12
2	(Algeria) M A Belarbi (Algeria) A Hamek	21	21

Quarter-finals
5	(Egypt) A Elbahnasawy (Egypt) K Ezzat	21	21
2	(Algeria) M A Belarbi (Algeria) A Hamek	14	17

== Women's doubles ==
=== Seeds ===
1. (South Africa) Amy Ackerman / Johanita Scholtz (champions)
2. (Algeria) Yasmina Chibah / Linda Mazri (semi-finals)
3. (Uganda) Fadilah Mohamed Rafi / Tracy Naluwooza (semi-finals)
4. (Egypt) Nour Ahmed Youssri / Doha Hany (final)

=== Finals ===
Semi-finals
1	(South Africa) Amy Ackerman (South Africa) Johanita Scholtz	21	21
3	(Uganda) Fadilah Mohamed Rafi (Uganda) Tracy Naluwooza	16	10
4	(Egypt) Nour Ahmed Youssri (Egypt) Doha Hany	20	21	21
2	(Algeria) Yasmina Chibah (Algeria) Linda Mazri	22	11	9

Final
1	(South Africa) Amy Ackerman (South Africa) Johanita Scholtz	21	21
4	(Egypt) Nour Ahmed Youssri (Egypt) Doha Hany	18	17

=== Top half ===
==== Section 1 ====
First round
J N Sengera; N Wandili	13	18
(Mauritius) C How Hong (Mauritius) E How Hong	21	21
(Algeria) S Ibrahim (Algeria) T Mammeri	21	21
(Zambia) M Kalandanya (Zambia) E Mwansa	8	5

Second round
1	(South Africa) A Ackerman (South Africa) J Scholtz	21	21
(Mauritius) C How Hong (Mauritius) E How Hong	9	6
(Egypt) G Elwazery (Egypt) H Tarek	14	18
(Algeria) S Ibrahim (Algeria) T Mammeri	21	21

Quarter-finals
1	(South Africa) A Ackerman (South Africa) J Scholtz	21	21
(Algeria) S Ibrahim (Algeria) T Mammeri	12	16

==== Section 2 ====
First round
(Seychelles) A Camille (Seychelles) A Jean-Louis	w	/	o
(Lesotho) K Khetheng (Lesotho) T Talejane
(Nigeria) R C Ebere (Nigeria) O Obasanmi	21	21
(Cameroon) P R E Eyono (Cameroon) M P Ngo Hiol	11	12

Second round
3	(Uganda) F M Rafi (Uganda) T Naluwooza	21	21
(Seychelles) A Camille (Seychelles) A Jean-Louis	11	5
(Botswana) T Kabelo (Botswana) T Ndzinge	21	22
(Nigeria) R C Ebere (Nigeria) O Obasanmi	16	20

Quarter-finals
3	(Uganda) F M Rafi (Uganda) T Naluwooza	21	21
(Botswana) T Kabelo (Botswana) T Ndzinge	15	7

=== Bottom half ===
==== Section 3 ====
First round
(Uganda) G Mbabazi (Uganda) K Nalumansi	21	21
(Lesotho) L Matlosa (Lesotho) K Moeletsi	12	6
B Buyanzi; B Cherop	21	10	21
(Zambia) M Chilambe (Zambia) E Siamupangila	10	21	12

Second round
(Uganda) G Mbabazi (Uganda) K Nalumansi	21	17
(Cameroon) M Akoumba Ze (Cameroon) M Anamba	11	12^{r}
B Buyanzi; B Cherop	10	10
4	(Egypt) N A Youssri (Egypt) D Hany	21	21

Quarter-finals
(Uganda) G Mbabazi (Uganda) K Nalumansi	12	13
4	(Egypt) N A Youssri (Egypt) D Hany	21	21

==== Section 4 ====
First round
(South Africa) E de Villiers (South Africa) A Schoonees	21	21
(Zimbabwe) N T Sibanda (Zimbabwe) S T Sibanda	8	9
(Botswana) K Ntebela (Botswana) T Willie	14	15
(Mauritius) T Bhurtun (Mauritius) L L Chiniah	21	21

Second round
(South Africa) E de Villiers (South Africa) A Schoonees	21	18	21
(Nigeria) Z D Alabi (Nigeria) S A Obanishola	18	21	19
(Mauritius) T Bhurtun (Mauritius) L L Chiniah	11	11
2	(Algeria) Y Chibah (Algeria) L Mazri	21	21

Quarter-finals
(South Africa) E de Villiers (South Africa) A Schoonees	12	18
2	(Algeria) Y Chibah (Algeria) L Mazri	21	21

== Mixed doubles ==
=== Seeds ===
1. (Algeria) Koceila Mammeri / Tanina Mammeri (champions)
2. (Egypt) Adham Hatem Elgamal / Doha Hany (semi-finals)
3. (Zambia) Chongo Mulenga / Mary Chilambe (quarter-finals)
4. (Algeria) Mohamed Abderrahime Belarbi / Sirine Ibrahim (third round)
5. (Uganda) Muzafaru Lubega / Gladys Mbabazi (second round)
6. (Mauritius) Lucas Douce / Chiara How Hong (quarter-finals)
7. (Zambia) Mark Banda / Evelyn Siamupangila (second round)
8. (Mauritius) Julien Paul / Elsa How Hong (quarter-finals)

=== Finals ===
Semi-finals
1	(Algeria) Koceila Mammeri (Algeria) Tanina Mammeri	21	21
(Nigeria) Saidu Aliyu (Nigeria) Olajumoke Obasanmi	12	7
(South Africa) Caden Kakora (South Africa) Amy Ackerman	19	21	21
2	(Egypt) Adham Hatem Elgamal (Egypt) Doha Hany	21	18	16

Final
1	(Algeria) Koceila Mammeri (Algeria) Tanina Mammeri	21	21
(South Africa) Caden Kakora (South Africa) Amy Ackerman	12	9

=== Top half ===
==== Section 1 ====
First round
(Lesotho) K Mohapi (Lesotho) L Matlosa	21	21
(Zimbabwe) A Bonde (Zimbabwe) V T Samuriwo	16	15

Second round
1	(Algeria) K Mammeri (Algeria) T Mammeri	21	21
(Zambia) W Kafunda (Zambia) M Kalandanya	2	6
(Mauritius) D Bedier (Mauritius) L Bedier	13	12
(South Africa) R Vigario (South Africa) C Lai	21	21
8	(Mauritius) J Paul (Mauritius) E How Hong	21	21
(Botswana) T Kabomo (Botswana) T Willie	13	14
(Cameroon) J M F Evina (Cameroon) M P Ngo Hiol	21	21
(Lesotho) K Mohapi (Lesotho) L Matlosa	12	1

Third round
1	(Algeria) K Mammeri (Algeria) T Mammeri	21	21
(South Africa) R Vigario (South Africa) C Lai	6	9
8	(Mauritius) J Paul (Mauritius) E How Hong	w	/	o
(Cameroon) J M F Evina (Cameroon) M P Ngo Hiol

Quarter-finals
1	(Algeria) K Mammeri (Algeria) T V Mammeri	21	21
8	(Mauritius) J Paul (Mauritius) E How Hong	8	10

==== Section 2 ====
First round
(Seychelles) J Renaud (Seychelles) A Camille	21	21
(Lesotho) N Rahlolo (Lesotho) K Khetheng	3	9

Second round
3	(Zambia) C Mulenga (Zambia) M Chilambe	21	21
(Zimbabwe) T B Mathe (Zimbabwe) F L Oliviero	11	11
(Egypt) A Elbahnasawy (Egypt) G Elwazery	21	21
(Ivory Coast) J I Agnimel (Ivory Coast) A Lekpehi	9	8
5	(Uganda) M Lubega (Uganda) G Mbabazi	17	19
(Nigeria) S Aliyu (Nigeria) O Obasanmi	21	21
(Botswana) T K Kgosidialwa (Botswana) T Ndzinge	13	7
(Seychelles) J Renaud (Seychelles) A Camille	21	21

Third round
3	(Zambia) C Mulenga (Zambia) M Chilambe	17	26	21
(Egypt) A Elbahnasawy (Egypt) G Elwazery	21	24	15
(Nigeria) S Aliyu (Nigeria) O Obasanmi	21	21
(Seychelles) J Renaud (Seychelles) A Camille	15	16

Quarter-finals
3	(Zambia) C Mulenga (Zambia) M Chilambe	16	12
(Nigeria) S Aliyu (Nigeria) O Obasanmi	21	21

=== Bottom half ===
==== Section 3 ====
First round
(Cameroon) P C Assembe Voundi (Cameroon) M Anamba	21	21
(Zimbabwe) B Mahwire (Zimbabwe) S T Sibanda	8	7
(Cameroon) P Nolem (Cameroon) P R E Eyono
6	(Mauritius) L Douce (Mauritius) C How Hong	w	/	o
(South Africa) C Kakora (South Africa) A Ackerman	21	21
(Egypt) S Omar (Egypt) F Rabie	10	3

Second round
(Cameroon) P C Assembe Voundi (Cameroon) M Anamba	21	21
(Seychelles) Y Didon (Seychelles) A Jean-Louis	12	15
(Botswana) G Kethabanetswe (Botswana) T Kabelo	15	12
6	(Mauritius) L Douce (Mauritius) C How Hong	21	21
(South Africa) C Kakora (South Africa) A Ackerman	w	/	o
(Lesotho) L Matlosa (Lesotho) K Moeletsi
(Uganda) R M Nsubuga (Uganda) F Mohamed Rafi	17	14
4	(Algeria) M A Belarbi (Algeria) S Ibrahim	21	21

Third round
(Cameroon) P C Assembe Voundi (Cameroon) M Anamba
6	(Mauritius) L Douce (Mauritius) C How Hong	w	/	o
(South Africa) C Kakora (South Africa) A Ackerman	21	21
4	(Algeria) M A Belarbi (Algeria) S Ibrahim	15	10

Quarter-finals
6	(Mauritius) L Douce (Mauritius) C How Hong	19	13
(South Africa) C Kakora (South Africa) A Ackerman	21	21

==== Section 4 ====
First round
(Nigeria) A Samuel (Nigeria) J P Tunze	21	21
(Cameroon) F D Nkonomo Bengono (Cameroon) M Akoumba Ze	8	12

Second round
(Nigeria) A Samuel (Nigeria) J P Tunze	21	21
(Mauritius) K R Nundah (Mauritius) T Bhurtun	19	18
(Algeria) Y S Medel (Algeria) L Mazri	21	21
7	(Zambia) M Banda (Zambia) E Siamupangila	14	12
(Botswana) T Moilwa (Botswana) K Ntebela	14	15
(South Africa) M Vigario (South Africa) A Schoonees	21	21
(Uganda) A Oduka (Uganda) T Naluwooza	12	12
2	(Egypt) A H Elgamal (Egypt) D Hany	21	21

Third round
(Nigeria) A Samuel (Nigeria) J P Tunze	21	16	21
(Algeria) Y S Medel (Algeria) L Mazri	14	21	16
(South Africa) M Vigario (South Africa) A Schoonees	14	17
2	(Egypt) A H Elgamal (Egypt) D Hany	21	21

Quarter-finals
(Nigeria) A Samuel (Nigeria) J P Tunze	17	12
2	(Egypt) A H Elgamal (Egypt) D Hany	21	21
