= Badminton at the 2023 African Games – Women's doubles =

Women's doubles at the 2023 African Games
- Venue: Borteyman Sports Complex
- Dates: 8–10 March 2024

Medalists
gold medal	Husina Kobugabe; Gladys Mbabazi	Uganda
silver medal	Halla Bouksani; Tanina Mammeri	Algeria
bronze medal	Dorcas Ajoke Adesokan; Sofiat Arinola Obanishola	Nigeria
bronze medal	Nour Ahmed Youssri; Doha Hany	Egypt

The badminton women's doubles tournament at the 2023 African Games in Accra took place from 8 to 10 March 2024 at the Borteyman Sports Complex.

== Schedule ==
All times are Greenwich Mean Time (UTC±00:00)

Date	Time	Event
Friday, 8 March 2024	09:00	Round of 32
Saturday, 9 March 2024	09:00	Round of 16
Saturday, 9 March 2024	15:00	Quarter-finals
Sunday, 10 March 2024	09:00	Semi-finals
Sunday, 10 March 2024	15:00	Gold medal match

== Results ==
=== Seeds ===
1. Amy Ackerman / Deidre Laurens (RSA) (quarter-finals)
2. Husina Kobugabe / Gladys Mbabazi (UGA)
3. Fadilah Mohamed Rafi / Tracy Naluwooza (UGA) (quarter-finals)
4. Yasmina Chibah / Linda Mazri (ALG) (second round)

=== Finals ===
Semi-finals
Halla Bouksani (ALG); Tanina Mammeri (ALG)	21	21
Dorcas Ajoke Adesokan (NGR); Sofiat Arinola Obanishola (NGR)	17	16
Nour Ahmed Youssri (EGY); Doha Hany (EGY)	14	14
2	Husina Kobugabe (UGA); Gladys Mbabazi (UGA)	21	21

Final
Halla Bouksani (ALG); Tanina Mammeri (ALG)	21	14
2	Husina Kobugabe (UGA); Gladys Mbabazi (UGA)	23	21

=== Top half ===
==== Section 1 ====
First round

Second round
1	A Ackerman (RSA); D Laurens (RSA)	21	21
R Adjima (TOG); I Kuassi-Kpede (TOG)	6	3
L Y Davordzi (GHA); C Tornyenyor (GHA)	5	2
H Bouksani (ALG); T Mammeri (ALG)	21	21

Quarter-finals
1	A Ackerman (RSA); D Laurens (RSA)	17	23
H Bouksani (ALG); T Mammeri (ALG)	21	25

==== Section 2 ====
First round
1	R Eladawy (EGY); H Tarek (EGY)	21	21
L Belem (BUR); D Sebgo (BUR)	3	4

Second round
3	F Mohamed Rafi (UGA); T Naluwooza (UGA)	21	21
A Akakpo (BEN); F Kpogbemabou (BEN)	10	11
D A Adesokan (NGR); S A Obanishola (NGR)	21	21
1	R Eladawy (EGY); H Tarek (EGY)	2	12

Quarter-finals
3	F Mohamed Rafi (UGA); T Naluwooza (UGA)	7	15
D A Adesokan (NGR); S A Obanishola (NGR)	21	21

=== Bottom half ===
==== Section 3 ====
First round
M A K Adu (GHA); P Nantuo (GHA)	21	21
B Loubaki (CGO); S R Piffo (CGO)	5	3

Second round
M A K Adu (GHA); P Nantuo (GHA)	20	21	18
M Kalandanya (ZAM); O Siamupangila (ZAM)	22	12	21
N Ahmed Youssri (EGY); D Hany (EGY)	21	22
4	Y Chibah (ALG); L Mazri (ALG)	17	20

Quarter-finals
M Kalandanya (ZAM); O Siamupangila (ZAM)	5	8
N Ahmed Youssri (EGY); D Hany (EGY)	21	21

==== Section 4 ====
First round

Second round
G Gabriel (NGR); R Yakubu (NGR)	21	21
R Bilogo (BUR); K Diallo (BUR)	9	2
K Dookhee (MRI); Kate Ludik (MRI)	14	21	17
2	H Kobugabe (UGA); G Mbabazi (UGA)	21	18	21

Quarter-finals
G Gabriel (NGR); R Yakubu (NGR)	13	14
2	H Kobugabe (UGA); G Mbabazi (UGA)	21	21
