= Badminton at the 2019 African Games =

- Venue: Ain Chock Indoor Sports Center
- Location: Casablanca, Morocco
- Dates: 22–29 August

Badminton events at the 2019 African Games took place between 22 and 29 August at the Ain Chock Indoor Sports Center in Casablanca, Morocco. The badminton program in 2019 included men's and women's singles competitions; men's, women's and mixed doubles competitions alongside a mixed team event throughout the eight days of competition. The tournament served as a qualifier for the 2020 Summer Olympics in Tokyo, Japan.

== Schedule ==
P	Preliminary rounds	¼	Quarterfinals	½	Semifinals	F	Final

Event↓/Date →	22nd Thu	23rd Fri	24th Sat		25th Sun		26th Mon	27th Tue	28th Wed		29th Thu
Men's singles							P	P	¼	½	F
Men's doubles								P	¼	½	F
Women's singles							P	P	¼	½	F
Women's doubles								P	¼	½	F
Mixed doubles							P	P	¼	½	F
Mixed team	P	P	P	¼	½	F					

== Medal summary ==
The table below gives an overview of the medal table and result of badminton at the 2019 African Games:

=== Medal table ===
Rank	Nation	Gold	Silver	Bronze	Total
1	Nigeria (NGR)	2	3	3	8
2	Egypt (EGY)	1	1	4	6
3	Mauritius (MRI)	1	1	1	3
4	Algeria (ALG)	1	1	0	2
5	South Africa (RSA)	1	0	2	3
6	Uganda (UGA)	0	0	1	1
6	Zambia (ZAM)	0	0	1	1
Totals (7 entries)		6	6	12	24

=== Medalists ===
Event	Gold	Silver	Bronze
Men's singles	Anuoluwapo Juwon Opeyori; Nigeria	Julien Paul; Mauritius	Godwin Olofua; Nigeria
Men's singles	Anuoluwapo Juwon Opeyori; Nigeria	Julien Paul; Mauritius	Kalombo Mulenga; Zambia
Men's doubles	Mauritius; Aatish Lubah; Julien Paul	Nigeria; Godwin Olofua; Anuoluwapo Juwon Opeyori	Egypt; Abdelrahman Abdelhakim; Mohamed Mostafa Kamel
Men's doubles	Mauritius; Aatish Lubah; Julien Paul	Nigeria; Godwin Olofua; Anuoluwapo Juwon Opeyori	Egypt; Adham Hatem Elgamal; Ahmed Salah
Women's singles	Johanita Scholtz; South Africa	Dorcas Adesokan; Nigeria	Doha Hany; Egypt
Women's singles	Johanita Scholtz; South Africa	Dorcas Adesokan; Nigeria	Sofiat Arinola Obanishola; Nigeria
Women's doubles	Egypt; Doha Hany; Hadia Hosny	Nigeria; Dorcas Adesokan; Deborah Ukeh	South Africa; Megan de Beer; Johanita Scholtz
Women's doubles	Egypt; Doha Hany; Hadia Hosny	Nigeria; Dorcas Adesokan; Deborah Ukeh	Uganda; Gladys Mbabazi; Aisha Nakiyemba
Mixed doubles	Algeria; Koceila Mammeri; Linda Mazri	Egypt; Adham Hatem Elgamal; Doha Hany	Mauritius; Julien Paul; Aurélie Allet
Mixed doubles	Algeria; Koceila Mammeri; Linda Mazri	Egypt; Adham Hatem Elgamal; Doha Hany	Nigeria; Enejoh Abah; Peace Orji
Team	Nigeria; Enejoh Abah; Gideon Babalola; Habeeb Temitope Bello; Clement Krobakpo; Godwin Olofua; Anuoluwapo Juwon Opeyori; Dorcas Adesokan; Zainab Damilola Alabi; Amin Yop Christopher; Sofiat Arinola Obanishola; Peace Orji; Deborah Ukeh	Algeria; Mohamed Abderrahime Belarbi; Seïf-Eddine Larbaoui; Koceila Mammeri; Youcef Sabri Medel; Mohamed Abdelaziz Ouchefoun; Halla Bouksani; Yassimina Chibah; Linda Mazri; Malak Ouchefoune	South Africa; Jarred Elliott; Jason Mann; Sean Noone; Ruan Snyman; Bongani von Bodenstein; Megan de Beer; Lehandre Schoeman; Johanita Scholtz
Team	Nigeria; Enejoh Abah; Gideon Babalola; Habeeb Temitope Bello; Clement Krobakpo; Godwin Olofua; Anuoluwapo Juwon Opeyori; Dorcas Adesokan; Zainab Damilola Alabi; Amin Yop Christopher; Sofiat Arinola Obanishola; Peace Orji; Deborah Ukeh	Algeria; Mohamed Abderrahime Belarbi; Seïf-Eddine Larbaoui; Koceila Mammeri; Youcef Sabri Medel; Mohamed Abdelaziz Ouchefoun; Halla Bouksani; Yassimina Chibah; Linda Mazri; Malak Ouchefoune	Egypt; Abdelrahman Abdelhakim; Adham Hatem Elgamal; Mohamed Mostafa Kamel; Ahmed Salah; Nour Ahmed Youssri; Jana Ashraf; Doha Hany; Hadia Hosny

== Men's singles ==
=== Seeds ===
1. (Mauritius) Julien Paul (final)
2. (Nigeria) Anuoluwapo Juwon Opeyori (winner)
3. (Nigeria) Godwin Olofua (semifinals)
4. (Egypt) Adham Hatem Elgamal (quarterfinals)
5. (Egypt) Ahmed Salah (third round)
6. (Zambia) Kalombo Mulenga (semifinals)
7. (Nigeria) Habeeb Temitope Bello (quarterfinals)
8. (Mauritius) Melvin Appiah (quarterfinals)

=== Finals ===
Quarterfinals
1	(Mauritius) Julien Paul	21	21
7	(Nigeria) Habeeb Temitope Bello	15	10
3	(Nigeria) Godwin Olofua	21	21
(Algeria) Youcef Sabri Medel	16	9
6	(Zambia) Kalombo Mulenga	11	24	21
4	(Egypt) Adham Hatem Elgamal	21	22	12
8	(Mauritius) Melvin Appiah	16	20
2	(Nigeria) Anuoluwapo Juwon Opeyori	21	22

Semifinals
1	(Mauritius) Julien Paul	21	21
3	(Nigeria) Godwin Olofua	17	11
6	(Zambia) Kalombo Mulenga	22	21	13
2	(Nigeria) Anuoluwapo Juwon Opeyori	24	16	21

Final
1	(Mauritius) Julien Paul	16	17
2	(Nigeria) Anuoluwapo Juwon Opeyori	21	21

=== Top half ===
==== Section 1 ====
First Round
(Zambia) C E Mulenga	10	22	7
(Egypt) M M Kamel	21	20	21
(Morocco) B Elharab	18	21	18
(Algeria) M A Ouchefoun	21	19	21

Second Round
1	(Mauritius) J Paul	21	21
(Egypt) M M Kamel	17	6
(Tunisia) R E M Belleh	4	5
(Algeria) M A Ouchefoun	21	21

Third Round
1	(Mauritius) J Paul	19	21	21
(Algeria) M A Ouchefoun	21	8	6

==== Section 2 ====
First Round
(Eritrea) L Semere	7	7
(Kenya) E Akwanyi	21	21
(Ghana) E Botwe	21	14	19
(Ethiopia) F Estefanos	9	21	21
(Benin) R Razaki	11	15
(South Africa) R Snyman	21	21

Second Round
7	(Nigeria) H T Bello	21	21
(Kenya) E Akwanyi	18	15
(Ethiopia) F Estefanos	21	14	7
(South Africa) R Snyman	15	21	21

Third Round
7	(Nigeria) H T Bello	9	21	21
(South Africa) R Snyman	21	10	9

==== Section 3 ====
First Round
(Democratic Republic of the Congo) D J Okito	21	21
(Guinea) A Bah	10	1
(Kenya) N Kiprotich	13	15
(Uganda) D Mihigo	21	21

Second Round
3	(Nigeria) G Olofua	21	21
(Democratic Republic of the Congo) D J Okito	8	5
(Mauritius) A Lubah	21	21
(Uganda) D Mihigo	10	17

Third Round
3	(Nigeria) G Olofua	21	22
(Mauritius) A Lubah	16	20

==== Section 4 ====
First Round
(Tunisia) R Mouin	4	5
(Ghana) M O Baah	21	21
(South Africa) J Mann	10	16
(Algeria) Y S Medel	21	21
(Ethiopia) A G Sahilu	22	21
(Morocco) I Bellamou	20	12

Second Round
5	(Egypt) A Salah	21	19	21
(Ghana) M O Baah	18	21	19
(Algeria) Y S Medel	21	21
(Ethiopia) A G Sahilu	13	12

Third Round
5	(Egypt) A Salah	15	21	16
(Algeria) Y S Medel	21	17	21

=== Bottom half ===
==== Section 5 ====
First Round
(Algeria) M A Belarbi	21	21
(Ethiopia) Y Surafel	6	14
(Morocco) Y E Mernissi	13	21	21
(Kenya) E Njeri	21	11	16
(Uganda) D Senono	11	13
(South Africa) J Elliott	21	21

Second Round
(Algeria) M A Belarbi	21	21
11	(Morocco) Y E Mernissi	15	4
(South Africa) J Elliott	14	12
6	(Zambia) K Mulenga	21	21

Third Round
(Algeria) M A Belarbi	17	5
6	(Zambia) K Mulenga	21	21

==== Section 6 ====
First Round
(Tunisia) K Ouzaier	4	3
(Ghana) D Sam	21	21
(Democratic Republic of the Congo) Z Wapi	5	6
(Morocco) A Idlahoucine	21	21

Second Round
(Ghana) D Sam	15	21	21
(Nigeria) C Krobakpo	21	17	7
(Morocco) A Idlahoucine	9	7
4	(Egypt) A H Elgamal	21	21

Third Round
(Ghana) D Sam	9	21	16
4	(Egypt) A H Elgamal	21	14	21

==== Section 7 ====
First Round
(Egypt) A Abdelhakim	21	23
(Kenya) J Wanyoike	19	21
(Algeria) S Larbaoui	21	21
(Tunisia) D M Yassine	4	6
(Ethiopia) T Endale	21	15	22
(Morocco) A A Ksikes	16	21	24

Second Round
(Egypt) A Abdelhakim	17	21	21
(Algeria) S Larbaoui	21	19	23
(Morocco) A A Ksikes	9	20
8	(Mauritius) M Appiah	21	22

Third Round
(Algeria) S Larbaoui	19	17
8	(Mauritius) M Appiah	21	21

==== Section 8 ====
First Round
(Eritrea) F Samsom	9	8
(Uganda) B Kasirye	21	21
(Democratic Republic of the Congo) M Tshizanga	15	10
(Ghana) E Andrews	21	21

Second Round
(Uganda) B Kasirye	15	21	21
(South Africa) B v Bodenstein	21	19	13
(Ghana) E Andrews	7	21
2	(Nigeria) A J Opeyori	21	23

Third Round
(Uganda) B Kasirye	19	8
2	(Nigeria) A J Opeyori	21	21

== Women's singles ==
=== Seeds ===
1. (Nigeria) Dorcas Ajoke Adesokan (final)
2. (Egypt) Hadia Hosny (third round)
3. (Egypt) Doha Hany (semifinals)
4. (Uganda) Aisha Nakiyemba (third round)
5. (Zambia) Ogar Siamupangila (third round)
6. (Uganda) Gladys Mbabazi (second round)
7. (Mauritius) Aurélie Allet (third round)
8. (Nigeria) Uchechukwu Deborah Ukeh (quarterfinals)

=== Finals ===
Quarterfinals
1	(Nigeria) Dorcas Ajoke Adesokan	21	21
(Egypt) Nour Ahmed Youssri	19	10
3	(Egypt) Doha Hany	21	21
(Nigeria) Zainab Damilola Alabi	18	12
8	(Nigeria) Uchechukwu Deborah Ukeh	21	21	11
(South Africa) Johanita Scholtz	17	23	21
(Algeria) Yasmina Chibah	16	15
(Nigeria) Sofiat Arinola Obanishola	21	21

Semifinals
1	(Nigeria) Dorcas Ajoke Adesokan	21	21
3	(Egypt) Doha Hany	14	11
(South Africa) Johanita Scholtz	18	21	21
(Nigeria) Sofiat Arinola Obanishola	21	9	12

Final
1	(Nigeria) Dorcas Ajoke Adesokan	19	18
(South Africa) Johanita Scholtz	21	21

=== Top half ===
==== Section 1 ====
First Round
(Tunisia) H Fatma	7	5
(South Africa) M d Beer	21	21

Second Round
1	(Nigeria) D A Adesokan	21	21
(Ethiopia) B Melat	4	5
(Kenya) L Msomtai	6	9
(South Africa) M d Beer	21	21

Third Round
1	(Nigeria) D A Adesokan	21	21
(South Africa) M d Beer	11	11

==== Section 2 ====
First Round
(Mauritius) L Bodha	14	21	16
(Algeria) L Mazri	21	18	21

Second Round
6	(Uganda) G Mbabazi	23	21	17
(Egypt) N A Youssri	25	18	21
(Morocco) I E Khamiri	5	4
(Algeria) L Mazri	21	21

Third Round
(Egypt) N A Youssri	22	21
(Algeria) L Mazri	20	14

==== Section 3 ====
First Round
(Algeria) H Bouksani	21	21
(Eritrea) Y Okbamichael	3	1

Second Round
3	(Egypt) D Hany	21	21
(Kenya) J Akoth	6	9
(Mauritius) K Dookhee	19	9
(Algeria) H Bouksani	21	21

Third Round
3	(Egypt) D Hany	21	14	21
(Algeria) H Bouksani	15	21	17

==== Section 4 ====
First Round
(Morocco) J Bitarie	21	21
(Tunisia) B A Wiem	7	8
(Nigeria) Z D Alabi	21	20	21
(Seychelles) A Camille	8	22	12

Second Round
5	(Zambia) O Siamupangila	21	21
(Morocco) J Bitarie	10	10
(Democratic Republic of the Congo) K Odia	8	10
(Nigeria) Z D Alabi	21	21

Third Round
5	(Zambia) O Siamupangila	13	11
(Nigeria) Z D Alabi	21	21

=== Bottom half ===
==== Section 5 ====
First Round
(Democratic Republic of the Congo) B Kaboko	7	8
(Egypt) J Ashraf	21	21
(Tunisia) H Sarra	2	10
(Ethiopia) Y Tura	21	21

Second Round
(Egypt) J Ashraf	21	21
(Morocco) G Charouite	5	9
(Ethiopia) Y Tura	10	21	8
8	(Nigeria) U D Ukeh	21	17	21

Third Round
(Egypt) J Ashraf	10	17
8	(Nigeria) U D Ukeh	21	21

==== Section 6 ====
First Round
(South Africa) J Scholtz	21	21
(Algeria) M Ouchefoune	9	15

Second Round
(South Africa) J Scholtz	6
(Benin) P L Y Vitou	2^{r}
(Kenya) M Joseph	6	12
4	(Uganda) A Nakiyemba	21	21

Third Round
(South Africa) J Scholtz	21	14	21
4	(Uganda) A Nakiyemba	13	21	10

==== Section 7 ====
First Round
(Morocco) M Bengelloun	9	14
(Kenya) L Martins	21	21
(Uganda) M Namakoye	11	18
(Zambia) E Siamupangila	21	21

Second Round
(Kenya) L Martins	13	10
(Algeria) Y Chibah	21	21
(Zambia) E Siamupangila	11	18
7	(Mauritius) A Allet	21	21

Third Round
(Algeria) Y Chibah	16	21	25
7	(Mauritius) A Allet	21	16	23

==== Section 8 ====
First Round
(Nigeria) S A Obanishola	21	21
(Guinea) K Balde	1	2

Second Round
(Nigeria) S A Obanishola	21	21
(Eritrea) K Heyelom	7	11
(Democratic Republic of the Congo) M B Bokotsha	7	4
2	(Egypt) H Hosny	21	21

Third Round
(Nigeria) S A Obanishola	21	15	21
2	(Egypt) H Hosny	18	21	16

== Men's doubles ==
=== Seeds ===
1. (Nigeria) Godwin Olofua / Anuoluwapo Juwon Opeyori (final)
2. (Algeria) Koceila Mammeri / Youcef Sabri Medel (quarterfinals)
3. (Egypt) Adham Hatem Elgamal / Ahmed Salah (semifinals)
4. (Ghana) Michael Opoku Baah / Daniel Sam (second round)

=== Finals ===
Semifinals
1	(Nigeria) Godwin Olofua (Nigeria) Anuoluwapo Juwon Opeyori	21	21
(Egypt) Abdelrahman Abdelhakim (Egypt) Mohamed Mostafa Kamel	10	14
3	(Egypt) Adham Hatem Elgamal (Egypt) Ahmed Salah	14	21	18
(Mauritius) Aatish Lubah (Mauritius) Julien Paul	21	14	21

Final
1	(Nigeria) Godwin Olofua (Nigeria) Anuoluwapo Juwon Opeyori	9	18
(Mauritius) Aatish Lubah (Mauritius) Julien Paul	21	21

=== Top half ===
==== Section 1 ====
First Round
(Ethiopia) A G Sahilu (Ethiopia) Y Surafel	10	14
(Morocco) B Elharab (Morocco) A Idlahoucine	21	21

Second Round
1	(Nigeria) G Olofua (Nigeria) A J Opeyori	21	21
(Democratic Republic of the Congo) D J Okito (Democratic Republic of the Congo) M Tshizanga	7	13
(Tunisia) K Ouzaier (Tunisia) R Mouin	8	7
(Morocco) B Elharab (Morocco) A Idlahoucine	21	21

Quarterfinals
1	(Nigeria) G Olofua (Nigeria) A J Opeyori	21	21
(Morocco) B Elharab (Morocco) A Idlahoucine	15	10

==== Section 2 ====
First Round
(South Africa) J Elliott (South Africa) S Noone	21	18	15
(Uganda) B Kasirye (Uganda) D Mihigo	19	21	21
(Kenya) E Njeri (Kenya) J Wanyoike	19	21	16
(Egypt) A Abdelhakim (Egypt) M M Kamel	21	15	21

Second Round
4	(Ghana) M O Baah (Ghana) D Sam	15	20
(Uganda) B Kasirye (Uganda) D Mihigo	21	22
(Algeria) S Larbaoui (Algeria) M A Ouchefoun	21	19	17
(Egypt) A Abdelhakim (Egypt) M M Kamel	15	21	21

Quarterfinals
(Uganda) B Kasirye (Uganda) D Mihigo	21	16	16
(Egypt) A Abdelhakim (Egypt) M M Kamel	17	21	21

=== Bottom half ===
==== Section 3 ====
First Round
(South Africa) J Mann (South Africa) B v Bodenstein	21	21
(Tunisia) Y Hafouz (Tunisia) R E M Belleh	5	5
(Kenya) E Akwanyi (Kenya) N Kiprotich	21	21
(Morocco) I Bellamou (Morocco) A A Ksikes	17	10

Second Round
(South Africa) J Mann (South Africa) B v Bodenstein	26	21
(Ethiopia) T Endale (Ethiopia) F Estefanos	24	16
(Kenya) E Akwanyi (Kenya) N Kiprotich	7	15
3	(Egypt) A H Elgamal (Egypt) A Salah	21	21

Quarterfinals
(South Africa) J Mann (South Africa) B v Bodenstein	19	13
3	(Egypt) A H Elgamal (Egypt) A Salah	21	21

==== Section 4 ====
First Round
(Eritrea) F Samsom (Eritrea) L Semere	10	12
(Ghana) E Andrews (Ghana) E Botwe	21	21
(Nigeria) E Abah (Nigeria) C Krobakpo	21	21
(Zambia) C E Mulenga (Zambia) K Mulenga	17	9

Second Round
(Ghana) E Andrews (Ghana) E Botwe
(Mauritius) A Lubah (Mauritius) J Paul	w	/	o
(Nigeria) E Abah (Nigeria) C Krobakpo	10	21	19
2	(Algeria) K Mammeri (Algeria) Y S Medel	21	18	21

Quarterfinals
(Mauritius) A Lubah (Mauritius) J Paul	28	17	21
2	(Algeria) K Mammeri (Algeria) Y S Medel	26	21	17

== Women's doubles ==
=== Seeds ===
1. (Egypt) Doha Hany / Hadia Hosny (champion)
2. (Nigeria) Dorcas Ajoke Adesokan / Uchechukwu Deborah Ukeh (final)
3. (Mauritius) Aurélie Allet / Kobita Dookhee (quarterfinals)
4. (Zambia) Evelyn Siamupangila / Ogar Siamupangila (second round)

=== Finals ===
Semifinals
1	(Egypt) Doha Hany (Egypt) Hadia Hosny	21	21
(Uganda) Gladys Mbabazi (Uganda) Aisha Nakiyemba	17	4
(South Africa) Megan de Beer (South Africa) Johanita Scholtz	16	13
2	(Nigeria) Dorcas Ajoke Adesokan (Nigeria) Uchechukwu Deborah Ukeh	21	21

Final
1	(Egypt) Doha Hany (Egypt) Hadia Hosny	21	21
2	(Nigeria) Dorcas Ajoke Adesokan (Nigeria) Uchechukwu Deborah Ukeh	9	16

=== Top half ===
==== Section 1 ====
First Round	Second Round				Quarterfinals
	1	(Egypt) D Hany (Egypt) H Hosny	21	21
		(Ethiopia) B Melat (Ethiopia) Y Tura	6	13
					1	(Egypt) D Hany (Egypt) H Hosny	21	21
						(Algeria) Y Chibah (Algeria) M Ouchefoune	15	17
		(Algeria) Y Chibah (Algeria) M Ouchefoune	21	21
		(Morocco) M Bengelloun (Morocco) I E Khamiri	4	9

==== Section 2 ====
First Round
(Tunisia) B A Wiem (Tunisia) H Sarra	4	3
(Kenya) M Joseph (Kenya) L Martins	21	21

Second Round
4	(Zambia) E Siamupangila (Zambia) O Siamupangila	12	13
(Uganda) G Mbabazi (Uganda) A Nakiyemba	21	21
(Nigeria) A Y Christopher (Nigeria) P Orji	21	21
(Kenya) M Joseph (Kenya) L Martins	8	10

Quarterfinals
(Uganda) G Mbabazi (Uganda) A Nakiyemba	21	15	21
(Nigeria) A Y Christopher (Nigeria) P Orji	8	21	19

=== Bottom half ===
==== Section 3 ====
First Round
(South Africa) M d Beer (South Africa) J Scholtz	21	21
(Eritrea) K Heyelom (Eritrea) Y Okbamichael	4	9

Second Round
(South Africa) M d Beer (South Africa) J Scholtz	21	21
(Algeria) H Bouksani (Algeria) L Mazri	19	16
(Egypt) N A Youssri (Egypt) J Ashraf	8	21	17
3	(Mauritius) A Allet (Mauritius) K Dookhee	21	17	21

Quarterfinals
(South Africa) M d Beer (South Africa) J Scholtz	22	17	21
3	(Mauritius) A Allet (Mauritius) K Dookhee	20	21	17

==== Section 4 ====
First Round	Second Round				Quarterfinals
		(Democratic Republic of the Congo) M B Bokotsha (Democratic Republic of the Congo) K Odia	4	13
		(Morocco) J Bitarie (Morocco) G Charouite	21	21
						(Morocco) J Bitarie (Morocco) G Charouite	11	7
					2	(Nigeria) D A Adesokan (Nigeria) U D Ukeh	21	21
		(Kenya) J Akoth (Kenya) L Msomtai	11	9
	2	(Nigeria) D A Adesokan (Nigeria) U D Ukeh	21	21

== Mixed doubles ==
=== Seeds ===
1. (Egypt) Ahmed Salah / Hadia Hosny (quarterfinals)
2. (Egypt) Adham Hatem Elgamal / Doha Hany (final)
3. (Nigeria) Enejoh Abah / Peace Orji (semifinals)
4. (Algeria) Koceila Mammeri / Linda Mazri (champion)
5. (Mauritius) Aatish Lubah / Kobita Dookhee (quarterfinals)
6. (Zambia) Kalombo Mulenga / Ogar Siamupangila (quarterfinals)
7. (Nigeria) Gideon Babalola / Zainab Damilola Alabi (quarterfinals)
8. (Mauritius) Julien Paul / Aurélie Allet (semifinals)

=== Finals ===
Quarterfinals
1	(Egypt) Ahmed Salah (Egypt) Hadia Hosny	15	21	16
8	(Mauritius) Julien Paul (Mauritius) Aurélie Allet	21	14	21
4	(Algeria) Koceila Mammeri (Algeria) Linda Mazri	21	21
7	(Nigeria) Gideon Babalola (Nigeria) Zainab Damilola Alabi	14	14
5	(Mauritius) Aatish Lubah (Mauritius) Kobita Dookhee	18	19
3	(Nigeria) Enejoh Abah (Nigeria) Peace Orji	21	21
6	(Zambia) Kalombo Mulenga (Zambia) Ogar Siamupangila	11	21	18
2	(Egypt) Adham Hatem Elgamal (Egypt) Doha Hany	21	17	21

Semifinals
8	(Mauritius) Julien Paul (Mauritius) Aurélie Allet	18	22	14
4	(Algeria) Koceila Mammeri (Algeria) Linda Mazri	21	20	21
3	(Nigeria) Enejoh Abah (Nigeria) Peace Orji	18	21	19
2	(Egypt) Adham Hatem Elgamal (Egypt) Doha Hany	21	13	21

Final
4	(Algeria) Koceila Mammeri (Algeria) Linda Mazri	21	21
2	(Egypt) Adham Hatem Elgamal (Egypt) Doha Hany	19	16

=== Top half ===
==== Section 1 ====
First Round	Second Round				Third Round
	1	(Egypt) A Salah (Egypt) H Hosny	21	21
		(Morocco) A A Ksikes (Morocco) M Bengelloun	10	9
					1	(Egypt) A Salah (Egypt) H Hosny	21	21
						(Kenya) N Kiprotich (Kenya) L Msomtai	5	13
		(Tunisia) K Ouzaier (Tunisia) B A Wiem	6	12
		(Kenya) N Kiprotich (Kenya) L Msomtai	21	21

==== Section 2 ====
First Round
(Eritrea) F Samsom (Eritrea) Y Okbamichael	14	8
(Ethiopia) Y Surafel (Ethiopia) B Melat	21	21

Second Round
8	(Mauritius) G J Paul (Mauritius) A Allet	21	21
(Algeria) Y S Medel (Algeria) M Ouchefoune	10	12
(Nigeria) H T Bello (Nigeria) A Y Christopher	21	21
(Ethiopia) Y Surafel (Ethiopia) B Melat	18	13

Third Round
8	(Mauritius) J Paul (Mauritius) A Allet	21	21
(Nigeria) H T Bello (Nigeria) A Y Christopher	11	14

==== Section 3 ====
First Round	Second Round				Third Round
	4	(Algeria) K Mammeri (Algeria) L Mazri	21	21
		(Tunisia) D M Yassine (Tunisia) H Sarra	9	4
					4	(Algeria) K Mammeri (Algeria) L Mazri	21	21
						(Uganda) B Kasirye (Uganda) A Nakiyemba	16	18
		(Uganda) B Kasirye (Uganda) A Nakiyemba	21	21
		(South Africa) J Elliott (South Africa) M d Beer	14	19

==== Section 4 ====
First Round
(Zambia) C E Mulenga (Zambia) E Siamupangila	21	21
(Democratic Republic of the Congo) Z Wapi (Democratic Republic of the Congo) M B Bokotsha	6	10

Second Round
7	(Nigeria) G Babalola (Nigeria) Z D Alabi	21	21
(Morocco) B Elharab (Morocco) G Charouite	15	13
(Kenya) E Akwanyi (Kenya) L Martins	16	21	13
(Zambia) C E Mulenga (Zambia) E Siamupangila	21	18	21

Third Round
7	(Nigeria) G Babalola (Nigeria) Z D Alabi	21	21
(Zambia) C E Mulenga (Zambia) E Siamupangila	15	17

=== Bottom half ===
==== Section 5 ====
First Round
(Egypt) M M Kamel (Egypt) J Ashraf	16	21	19
(Uganda) D Mihigo (Uganda) M Namakoye	21	16	21

Second Round
(Uganda) D Mihigo (Uganda) M Namakoye	26	8	23
(Algeria) M A Belarbi (Algeria) H Bouksani	24	21	25
(Eritrea) L Semere (Eritrea) K Heyelom	8	3
5	(Mauritius) A Lubah (Mauritius) K Dookhee	21	21

Third Round
(Algeria) M A Belarbi (Algeria) H Bouksani	19	21	10
5	(Mauritius) A Lubah (Mauritius) K Dookhee	21	13	21

==== Section 6 ====
First Round	Second Round					Third Round
		(Benin) R Razaki (Benin) P L Y Vitou
		(South Africa) B v Bodenstein (South Africa) L Schoeman	w	/	o
							(South Africa) B v Bodenstein (South Africa) L Schoeman	15	16
						3	(Nigeria) E Abah (Nigeria) P Orji	21	21
		(Morocco) A Idlahoucine (Morocco) J Bitarie	18	13
	3	(Nigeria) E Abah (Nigeria) P Orji	21	21

==== Section 7 ====
First Round
(Mauritius) M Appiah (Mauritius) L Bodha	21	21
(Morocco) I Bellamou (Morocco) I E Khamiri	6	7

Second Round
(Mauritius) M Appiah (Mauritius) L Bodha	21	21
(Tunisia) Y Hafouz (Tunisia) H Fatma	5	5
(South Africa) J Mann (South Africa) J Scholtz	22	13	18
6	(Zambia) K Mulenga (Zambia) O Siamupangila	20	21	21

Third Round
(Mauritius) M Appiah (Mauritius) L Bodha	15	18
6	(Zambia) K Mulenga (Zambia) O Siamupangila	21	21

==== Section 8 ====
First Round	Second Round				Third Round
		(Ethiopia) T Endale (Ethiopia) Y Tura	14	17
		(Kenya) J Wanyoike (Kenya) M Joseph	21	21
						(Kenya) J Wanyoike (Kenya) M Joseph	6	18
					2	(Egypt) A H Elgamal (Egypt) D Hany	21	21
		(Democratic Republic of the Congo) M Tshizanga (Democratic Republic of the Congo) K Odia	8	11
	2	(Egypt) A H Elgamal (Egypt) D Hany	21	21

== Mixed team event ==
=== Group stage ===
==== Group A ====
Team	Pld	W	L	MF	MA	MD	Pts
Algeria	2	2	0	10	0	+10	2
Uganda	2	1	1	5	5	0	1
DR Congo	2	0	2	0	10	−10	0

22 August 2019
Uganda	5–0	DR Congo
23 August 2019
Algeria	5–0	DR Congo
24 August 2019
Uganda	0–5	Algeria

==== Group B ====
Team	Pld	W	L	MF	MA	MD	Pts
Mauritius	2	2	0	10	0	+10	2
Kenya	2	1	1	3	7	−4	1
Morocco	2	0	2	2	8	−6	0

22 August 2019
Mauritius	5–0	Morocco
23 August 2019
Kenya	3–2	Morocco
24 August 2019
Mauritius	5–0	Kenya

==== Group C ====
Team	Pld	W	L	MF	MA	MD	Pts
Egypt	2	2	0	8	2	+6	2
South Africa	2	1	1	7	3	+4	1
Eritrea	2	0	2	0	10	-10	0

22 August 2019
Egypt	5–0	Eritrea
23 August 2019
South Africa	5–0	Eritrea
24 August 2019
Egypt	3–2	South Africa

==== Group D ====
Team	Pld	W	L	MF	MA	MD	Pts
Nigeria	3	3	0	14	1	+13	3
Zambia	3	2	1	11	4	+7	2
Ethiopia	3	1	2	5	10	−5	1
Tunisia	3	0	3	0	15	−15	0

22 August 2019
Nigeria	5–0	Ethiopia
Zambia	5–0	Tunisia
23 August 2019
Nigeria	5–0	Tunisia
Zambia	5–0	Ethiopia
24 August 2019
Nigeria	4–1	Zambia
Tunisia	0–5	Ethiopia

=== Knockout stage ===
Quarter-finals
24 August
Mauritius	1
South Africa	3
24 August
Algeria	3
Kenya	0
24 August
Zambia	0
Egypt	3
24 August
Uganda	0
Nigeria	3

Semi-finals
25 August
South Africa	2
Algeria	3
25 August
Egypt	0
Nigeria	3

Final
25 August
Algeria	0
Nigeria	3

== Participating nations ==
A total of 105 athletes from 17 nations competed in badminton at the 2019 African Games:

- Algeria (9)
- Benin (2)
- Democratic Republic of the Congo (6)
- Egypt (8)
- Eritrea (4)
- Ethiopia (6)
- Ghana (4)
- Guinea (2)
- Kenya (8)
- Mauritius (6)
- Morocco (10)
- Nigeria (12)
- Seychelles (1)
- South Africa (8)
- Tunisia (9)
- Uganda (6)
- Zambia (4)
