= Lekha Shehani =

Sri Lankan badminton player (born 1993)

Personal information
- Born: Dona Lekha Shehani Handunkuttihettige; 30 January 1993 (age 33)

Sport
- Country: Sri Lanka
- Sport: Badminton

Women's singles
- Highest ranking: 132 (19 May 2016)
- BWF profile
Medal record
Women's badminton
Representing Sri Lanka
South Asian Games
Silver medal – second place	2010 Dhaka	Women's team
Silver medal – second place	2016 Guwahati–Shillong	Women's team

Dona Lekha Shehani Handunkuttihettige (born 30 January 1993) is a Sri Lankan badminton player. She started to playing badminton at the age of 8. In 2009, she began to participate in the national badminton tournament, and in 2013, she won her first national title. She competed at the 2010 Summer Youth Olympics in Singapore. In 2014, she was the runner-up at the Uganda International tournament in the women's singles event. In 2016, she won the singles title at the Ivory Coast International, and in 2017, she won doubles title at the Ethiopia International in the women's singles and doubles event. Shehani was graduated from the Convent of Our Lady of Victories, Moratuwa.

== Achievements ==
=== BWF International Challenge/Series (3 titles, 1 runner-up) ===
Women's singles

Year	Tournament	Opponent	Score	Result
2014	Uganda International	(India) Trupti Murgunde	20–22, 14–21	(silver) Runner-up
2016	Côte d'Ivoire International	(Nigeria) Uchechukwu Deborah Ukeh	21–11, 21–14	(gold) Winner
2017	Ethiopia International	(Sri Lanka) Kavindika de Silva	21–14, 21–9	(gold) Winner

Women's doubles

Year	Tournament	Partner	Opponent	Score	Result
2017	Ethiopia International	(Sri Lanka) Kavindika de Silva	(Algeria) Halla Bouksani (Algeria) Linda Mazri	21–12, 19–21, 21–8	(gold) Winner

BWF International Challenge tournament
BWF International Series tournament
BWF Future Series tournament
