= Badminton at the 2018 African Youth Games =

Tournament details
- Dates: 19–25 July
- Edition: 2
- Venue: Salle Protection-Civile de Dar El-Beïda
- Location: Algiers, Algeria

The badminton competitions at the 2018 African Youth Games in Algiers, Algeria was held between 19 and 25 July at the Salle Protection-Civile de Dar El-Beïda.

== Medal summary ==
Events	Gold	Silver	Bronze
Boys' singles	(Mauritius) Jean Bernard Bongout	(Uganda) Brian Kasirye	(Nigeria) Daniel Christopher Egbonyi
Boys' singles	(Mauritius) Jean Bernard Bongout	(Uganda) Brian Kasirye	(Nigeria) Ahmad Balarabe Umar
Girls' singles	(Algeria) Halla Bouksani	(Algeria) Linda Mazri	(Nigeria) Zainab Damilola Alabi
Girls' singles	(Algeria) Halla Bouksani	(Algeria) Linda Mazri	(Nigeria) Ramatu Yakubu
Boys' doubles	(Nigeria) Khalil Safana Shamsuddeen (Nigeria) Ahmad Balarabe Umar	(Nigeria) Tunde Bankole (Nigeria) Daniel Christopher Egbonyi	(Algeria) Sifeddine Larbaoui (Algeria) Mohamed Abdelaziz Ouchefoun
Boys' doubles	(Nigeria) Khalil Safana Shamsuddeen (Nigeria) Ahmad Balarabe Umar	(Nigeria) Tunde Bankole (Nigeria) Daniel Christopher Egbonyi	(Egypt) Mohamed Toson (Egypt) Omar Yasser Hafez Kamel
Girls' doubles	(Algeria) Halla Bouksani (Algeria) Linda Mazri	(Mauritius) Jemimah Leung For Sang (Mauritius) Ganesha Mungrah	(Nigeria) Sofiat Arinola Obanishola (Nigeria) Christiana Olajumoke Obasanmi
Girls' doubles	(Algeria) Halla Bouksani (Algeria) Linda Mazri	(Mauritius) Jemimah Leung For Sang (Mauritius) Ganesha Mungrah	(Algeria) Dounia Naâma (Algeria) Malak Ouchefoune
Mixed doubles	(Egypt) Mahmoud Montaser (Egypt) Jana Ashraf	(Nigeria) Ahmad Balarabe Umar (Nigeria) Sofiat Arinola Obanishola	(Mauritius) Jean Bernard Bongout (Mauritius) Jemimah Leung For Sang
Mixed doubles	(Egypt) Mahmoud Montaser (Egypt) Jana Ashraf	(Nigeria) Ahmad Balarabe Umar (Nigeria) Sofiat Arinola Obanishola	(Nigeria) Daniel Christopher Egbonyi (Nigeria) Zainab Damilola Alabi
Boys' team	Nigeria; Tunde Bankole; Daniel Christopher Egbonyi; Khalil Safana Shamsuddeen; Ahmad Balarabe Umar	Egypt; Mahmoud Montaser; Mohamed Mostafa Kamel; Mohamed Toson; Omar Yasser Hafez Kamel	Algeria; Abderrahim Bouksani; Raouf Lamrani; Sifeddine Larbaoui; Oussama Mahmoudi; Tahar Skander Medel; Mohamed Abdelaziz Ouchefoun
Boys' team	Nigeria; Tunde Bankole; Daniel Christopher Egbonyi; Khalil Safana Shamsuddeen; Ahmad Balarabe Umar	Egypt; Mahmoud Montaser; Mohamed Mostafa Kamel; Mohamed Toson; Omar Yasser Hafez Kamel	Mauritius; Jean Bernard Bongout; Mevan Dewoo; Khabir Teeluck
Girls' team	Algeria; Kahina Amrouni; Halla Bouksani; Melissa Bounaas; Linda Mazri; Dounia Naâma; Malak Ouchefoune; Safsaf Rahima; Ines Ziani	Egypt; Nour Ahmed Youssri; Jana Ashraf; Malak Basem Sobhy Ebrahim; Hana Hesham Mohamed	Mauritius; Lorna Bodha; Jemimah Leung For Sang; Ganesha Mungrah
Girls' team	Algeria; Kahina Amrouni; Halla Bouksani; Melissa Bounaas; Linda Mazri; Dounia Naâma; Malak Ouchefoune; Safsaf Rahima; Ines Ziani	Egypt; Nour Ahmed Youssri; Jana Ashraf; Malak Basem Sobhy Ebrahim; Hana Hesham Mohamed	Nigeria; Zainab Damilola Alabi; Sofiat Arinola Obanishola; Christiana Olajumoke Obasanmi; Ramatu Yakubu

== Medal table ==
Rank	Nation	Gold	Silver	Bronze	Total
1	Algeria (ALG)	3	1	3	7
2	Nigeria (NGR)	2	2	7	11
3	Egypt (EGY)	1	2	1	4
4	Mauritius (MRI)	1	1	3	5
5	Uganda (UGA)	0	1	0	1
Totals (5 entries)		7	7	14	28
