= Sofiat Arinola Obanishola =

Nigerian badminton player (born 2003)

Personal information
- Born: 16 September 2003 (age 22)

Sport
- Country: Nigeria
- Sport: Badminton

Women's singles & doubles
- Highest ranking: 252 (WS 17 March 2020); 548 (XD 17 March 2020)
- BWF profile
Medal record
Women's badminton
Representing Nigeria
African Games
| Gold medal – first place | 2019 Rabat | Mixed team |
| Bronze medal – third place | 2019 Rabat | Women's singles |
| Bronze medal – third place | 2023 Accra | Women's doubles |
African Championships
| Gold medal – first place | 2019 Port Harcourt | Mixed team |
| Bronze medal – third place | 2024 Cairo | Women's doubles |
Africa Team Championships
| Bronze medal – third place | 2024 Cairo | Women's team |
| Bronze medal – third place | 2026 Gaborone | Women's team |
African Youth Games
| Silver medal – second place | 2018 Algiers | Mixed doubles |
| Bronze medal – third place | 2018 Algiers | Girls' doubles |
| Bronze medal – third place | 2018 Algiers | Girls' team |

Sofiat Arinola Obanishola (born 16 September 2003) is a Nigerian badminton player. She has participated in major badminton events at both local and international level. In the junior event, she won a silver in the mixed doubles, and two bronze medals in the girls' doubles and team events at the 2018 Algiers African Youth Games. Obanishola then participated at the 2019 Rabat African Games held in Casablanca, Morocco, and helps the Nigerian team clinched the gold medal, also won a bronze medal in the women's singles event.

== Achievements ==
=== African Games ===
Women's singles

| Year | Venue | Opponent | Score | Result |
|---|---|---|---|---|
| 2019 | Ain Chock Indoor Sports Center, Casablanca, Morocco | (South Africa) Johanita Scholtz | 21–18, 9–21, 12–21 | Bronze |

Women's doubles

| Year | Venue | Partner | Opponent | Score | Result |
|---|---|---|---|---|---|
| 2023 | Borteyman Sports Complex, Accra, Ghana | (Nigeria) Dorcas Ajoke Adesokan | (Algeria) Halla Bouksani (Algeria) Tanina Mammeri | 17–21, 16–21 | Bronze |

=== African Championships ===
Women's doubles

| Year | Venue | Partner | Opponent | Score | Result |
|---|---|---|---|---|---|
| 2024 | Cairo Stadium Indoor Halls Complex, Cairo, Egypt | (Nigeria) Dorcas Ajoke Adesokan | (Uganda) Husina Kobugabe (Uganda) Gladys Mbabazi | 21–18, 19–21, 18–21 | Bronze |

=== African Youth Games ===
Girls' doubles

| Year | Venue | Partner | Opponent | Score | Result |
|---|---|---|---|---|---|
| 2018 | Salle Protection-Civile de Dar El-Beïda, Algiers, Algeria | (Nigeria) Christiana Olajumoke Obasanmi | (Mauritius) Jemimah Leung For Sang (Mauritius) Ganesha Mungrah | 21–14, 18–21, 12–12 | Bronze |

Mixed doubles

| Year | Venue | Partner | Opponent | Score | Result |
|---|---|---|---|---|---|
| 2018 | Salle Protection-Civile de Dar El-Beïda, Algiers, Algeria | (Nigeria) Ahmad Balarabe Umar | (Egypt) Mahmoud Montaser (Egypt) Jana Ashraf | 16–21, 22–20, 23–25 | Silver |
