= Uchechukwu Deborah Ukeh =

Nigerian badminton player (born 1996)

Uchechukwu Deborah ukeh
Personal information
- Born: 12 November 1996 (age 29) Edo, Nigeria
- Height: 1.80 m (5 ft 11 in)
- Weight: 56 kg (123 lb)

Sport
- Country: Nigeria
- Sport: Badminton

Women's singles & doubles
- Highest ranking: 187 (WS 18 February 2020); 82 (WD 17 September 2019); 495 (XD 22 September 2016)
- BWF profile
Medal record
Women's badminton
Representing Nigeria
African Games
Gold medal – first place	2019 Rabat	Mixed team
Silver medal – second place	2019 Rabat	Women's doubles
Bronze medal – third place	2015 Brazzaville	Mixed team
African Championships
Gold medal – first place	2019 Port Harcourt	Women's doubles
Silver medal – second place	2020 Cairo	Women's doubles
Bronze medal – third place	2024 Cairo	Mixed doubles
Bronze medal – third place	2025 Douala	Mixed doubles
Africa Mixed Team Championships
Gold medal – first place	2019 Port Harcourt	Mixed team
Bronze medal – third place	2025 Douala	Mixed team
Africa Women's Team Championships
Silver medal – second place	2018 Algiers	Women's team
Bronze medal – third place	2024 Cairo	Women's team
African Youth Games
Gold medal – first place	2014 Gaborone	Girls' doubles
Gold medal – first place	2014 Gaborone	Mixed team
Bronze medal – third place	2014 Gaborone	Mixed doubles

Uchechukwu Deborah Ukeh (born 12 November 1996) is a Nigerian badminton player. In 2014, she competed at the African Youth Games, and won two gold medals in the girls' doubles and mixed team event. In 2016, she was the women's singles runner-up at the Ivory Coast International, and won the mixed doubles title partnered with Gideon Babalola. In 2017, she and Babalola reached the final round at the Ivory Coast International, but finished in second place. Ukeh also was the runner-up at the Benin International tournament in the women's singles and doubles events. At the national event, Ukeh who represented Edo State, was the women's singles and doubles runner-up at the Katsina Golden Star Badminton Championships.

== Achievements ==
=== African Games ===
Women's doubles
Year	Venue	Partner	Opponent	Score	Result
2019	Ain Chock Indoor Sports Center; Casablanca, Morocco	(Nigeria) Dorcas Ajoke Adesokan	(Egypt) Doha Hany (Egypt) Hadia Hosny	9–21, 16–21	Silver

=== African Championships ===
Women's doubles
Year	Venue	Partner	Opponent	Score	Result
2019	Alfred Diete-Spiff Centre, Port Harcourt, Nigeria	(Nigeria) Dorcas Ajoke Adesokan	(Nigeria) Amin Yop Christopher (Nigeria) Chineye Ibere	21–14, 20–22, 21–17	Gold
2020	Cairo Stadium Hall 2, Cairo, Egypt	(Nigeria) Dorcas Ajoke Adesokan	(Egypt) Doha Hany (Egypt) Hadia Hosny	14–21, 17–21	Silver

Mixed doubles
Year	Venue	Partner	Opponent	Score	Result
2024	Cairo Stadium Indoor Halls Complex, Cairo, Egypt	(Nigeria) Alhaji Aliyu Shehu	(Egypt) Adham Hatem Elgamal (Egypt) Doha Hany	9–21, 12–21	Bronze
2025	Gymnase de Japoma, Douala, Cameroon	(Nigeria) Alhaji Aliyu Shehu	(Egypt) Adham Hatem Elgamal (Egypt) Doha Hany	20–22, 21–9, 14–21	Bronze

=== African Youth Games ===
Girls' doubles
Year	Venue	Partner	Opponent	Score	Result
2014	Otse Police College; Gaborone, Botswana	(Nigeria) Dorcas Ajoke Adesokan	(Mauritius) Shaama Sandooyeea (Mauritius) Aurélie Allet	21–15, 21–15	Gold

Mixed doubles
Year	Venue	Partner	Opponent	Score	Result
2014	Otse Police College; Gaborone, Botswana	(Nigeria) Usman Isiaq	(South Africa) Bongani von Bodenstein (South Africa) Anri Schoones	14–21, 21–19, 14–21	Bronze

=== BWF International Challenge/Series (2 titles, 6 runners-up) ===
Women's singles
Year	Tournament	Opponent	Score	Result
2016	Ivory Coast International	(Sri Lanka) Lekha Shehani	11–21, 14–21	(silver) Runner-up
2017	Benin International	(Nigeria) Dorcas Ajoke Adesokan	7–21, 18–21	(silver) Runner-up

Women's doubles
Year	Tournament	Partner	Opponent	Score	Result
2013	Nigeria International	(Nigeria) Augustina Ebhomien Sunday	(Nigeria) Tosin Atolagbe (Nigeria) Fatima Azeez	21–18, 21–13	(gold) Winner
2017	Benin International	(Nigeria) Peace Orji	(Nigeria) Dorcas Ajoke Adesokan (Nigeria) Tosin Atolagbe	18–21, 21–16, 12–21	(silver) Runner-up
2019	Ghana International	(Nigeria) Dorcas Ajoke Adesokan	(India) K. Maneesha (India) Rutaparna Panda	11–21, 11–21	(silver) Runner-up

Mixed doubles
Year	Tournament	Partner	Opponent	Score	Result
2016	Ivory Coast International	(Nigeria) Gideon Babalola	(Benin) Tobiloba Oyewole (Benin) Xena Arisa	21–7, 21–10	(gold) Winner
2017	Ivory Coast International	(Nigeria) Gideon Babalola	(Nigeria) Enejoh Abah (Nigeria) Peace Orji	Walkover	(silver) Runner-up
2024	Lagos International	(Nigeria) Alhaji Aliyu Shehu	(India) Sathwik Reddy Kanapuram (India) Vaishnavi Khadkekar	12–21, 14–21	(silver) Runner-up

BWF International Challenge tournament
BWF International Series tournament
BWF Future Series tournament
