= Zainab Damilola Alabi =

Nigerian badminton player (born 2002)

Personal information
- Born: 16 October 2002 (age 23)
- Height: 1.80 m (5 ft 11 in)
- Weight: 59 kg (130 lb)

Sport
- Country: Nigeria
- Sport: Badminton

Women's singles & doubles
- Highest ranking: 246 (WS 22 October 2019); 404 (XD 10 September 2019)
- BWF profile
Medal record
Women's badminton
Representing Nigeria
African Games
Gold medal – first place	2019 Rabat	Mixed team
African Championships
Bronze medal – third place	2019 Port Harcourt	Women's singles
Africa Team Championships
Bronze medal – third place	2024 Cairo	Women's team
Bronze medal – third place	2026 Gaborone	Women's team
African Youth Games
Bronze medal – third place	2018 Algiers	Girls' singbles
Bronze medal – third place	2018 Algiers	Mixed doubles
Bronze medal – third place	2018 Algiers	Girls' team

Zainab Damilola Alabi (born 16 October 2002) is a Nigerian badminton player. She participated in major badminton events at both local and international level. As a junior player, she won three bronze medals at the 2018 African Youth Games held in Algiers, Algeria. Alabi then won the women's singles bronze medal at the 2019 African Championships, and also the mixed team gold medal at the 2019 Rabat African Games.

== Achievements ==
=== African Championships ===
Women's singles

Year	Venue	Opponent	Score	Result
2019	Alfred Diete-Spiff Centre, Port Harcourt, Nigeria	(Nigeria) Dorcas Ajoke Adesokan	20–22, 19–21	Bronze

=== African Youth Games ===
Girls' singles

Year	Venue	Opponent	Score	Result
2018	Salle Protection-Civile de Dar El-Beïda, Algiers, Algeria	(Algeria) Halla Bouksani	18–21, 13–12	Bronze

Mixed doubles

Year	Venue	Partner	Opponent	Score	Result
2018	Salle Protection-Civile de Dar El-Beïda, Algiers, Algeria	(Nigeria) Daniel Christopher Egbonyi	(Nigeria) Ahmad Balarabe Umar (Nigeria) Sofiat Arinola Obanishola	18–21, 18–21	Bronze
