= Gideon Babalola =

Nigerian badminton player (born 1994)

Personal information
- Born: 11 February 1994 (age 32)
- Height: 1.80 m (5 ft 11 in)
- Weight: 54 kg (119 lb)

Sport
- Country: Nigeria
- Sport: Badminton

Men's singles & doubles
- Highest ranking: 270 (MS 13 August 2019); 178 (MD 20 August 2019); 401 (XD 17 July 2014)
- BWF profile
Medal record
Men's badminton
Representing Nigeria
African Games
Gold medal – first place	2019 Rabat	Mixed team
African Championships
Bronze medal – third place	2017 Benoni	Mixed team

Gideon Babalola (born 11 February 1994) is a Nigerian badminton player. He was part of the national team that won the gold medal at the 2019 African Games.

In 2016, he won the mixed doubles title at the Ivory Coast International, partnered with Uchechukwu Deborah Ukeh. In 2017, he and Ukeh reached the final round at the Ivory Coast International, but finished runners-up.

== Achievements ==
=== BWF International Challenge/Series (2 titles, 3 runners-up) ===
Men's singles

Year	Tournament	Opponent	Score	Result
2013	Kenya International	(India) Subhankar Dey	19–21, 19–21	(silver) Runner-up
2016	Ivory Coast International	(Uganda) Edwin Ekiring	13–21, 21–12, 10–21	(silver) Runner-up

Men's doubles

Year	Tournament	Partner	Opponent	Score	Result
2021	Benin International	(Nigeria) Habeeb Temitope Bello	(South Africa) Daniel Steyn (South Africa) Bongani von Bodenstein	21–18, 21–17	(gold) Winner

Mixed doubles

Year	Tournament	Partner	Opponent	Score	Result
2016	Ivory Coast International	(Nigeria) Uchechukwu Deborah Ukeh	(Benin) Tobiloba Oyewole (Benin) Xena Arisa	21–7, 21–10	(gold) Winner
2017	Ivory Coast International	(Nigeria) Uchechukwu Deborah Ukeh	(Nigeria) Enejoh Abah (Nigeria) Peace Orji	Walkover	(silver) Runner-up

BWF International Challenge tournament
BWF International Series tournament
BWF Future Series tournament
