= Husina Kobugabe =

Ugandan badminton player (born 2001)

Personal information
- Born: 21 March 2001 (age 25)

Sport
- Country: Uganda
- Sport: Badminton
- Handedness: Right
- Coached by: William Kabindi

Women's singles & doubles
- Highest ranking: 123 (WS, 4 July 2024); 66 (WD with Gladys Mbabazi, 19 August 2024)
- BWF profile
Medal record
Women's badminton
Representing Uganda
African Games
Gold medal – first place	2023 Accra	Women's doubles
Silver medal – second place	2023 Accra	Women's singles
African Championships
Silver medal – second place	2024 Cairo	Women's doubles
Bronze medal – third place	2022 Kampala	Women's singles
Bronze medal – third place	2023 Benoni	Women's singles
Bronze medal – third place	2025 Douala	Women's singles
Bronze medal – third place	2021 Kampala	Women's doubles
Bronze medal – third place	2023 Benoni	Women's doubles
Africa Mixed Team Championships
Bronze medal – third place	2021 Kampala	Mixed team
Africa Women's Team Championships
Silver medal – second place	2022 Kampala	Women's team
Silver medal – second place	2024 Cairo	Women's team

Husina Kobugabe (born 21 March 2001) is an Ugandan badminton player.

== Career ==
Kobugabe made it to the National team in 2019. She attended Ndejje University.

Kobugabe won a gold medal at the 2023 African Games along with her partner Mbabazi, becoming the first ever Ugandan(s) to do that in the sport of badminton. Ugandan government awarded the pair with 300 million shillings for this achievement.

== Achievements ==
=== African Games ===
Women's singles
Year	Venue	Opponent	Score	Result
2023	Borteyman Sports Complex, Accra, Ghana	(South Africa) Johanita Scholtz	21–16, 17–21, 19–21	Silver

Women's doubles
Year	Venue	Partner	Opponent	Score	Result
2023	Borteyman Sports Complex; Accra, Ghana	(Uganda) Gladys Mbabazi	(Algeria) Halla Bouksani (Algeria) Tanina Mammeri	23–21, 21–14	Gold

=== African Championships ===
Women's singles
Year	Venue	Opponent	Score	Result
2022	Lugogo Arena, Kampala, Uganda	(Egypt) Doha Hany	18–21, 20–22	Bronze
2023	John Barrable Hall, Benoni, South Africa	(South Africa) Johanita Scholtz	13–21, 21–19, 16–21	Bronze
2025	Gymnase de Japoma, Douala, Cameroon	(Egypt) Nour Ahmed Youssri	12–21, 11–21	Bronze

Women's doubles
Year	Venue	Partner	Opponent	Score	Result
2021	MTN Arena, Kampala, Uganda	(Uganda) Gladys Mbabazi	(Algeria) Mounib Celia (Algeria) Tanina Mammeri	19–21, 17–21	Bronze
2023	John Barrable Hall, Benoni, South Africa	(Uganda) Gladys Mbabazi	(Algeria) Yasmina Chibah (Algeria) Linda Mazri	17–21, 17–21	Bronze
2024	Cairo Stadium Indoor Halls Complex, Cairo, Egypt	(Uganda) Gladys Mbabazi	(South Africa) Amy Ackerman (South Africa) Deidré Laurens	11–21, 15–21	Silver

=== International Challenge/Series ===
Women's doubles
Year	Tournament	Partner	Opponent	Score	Result
2021	Uganda International	(Uganda) Mable Namakoye	(Uganda) Tracy Naluwooza (Uganda) Fadilah Mohamed Rafi	21–9, 21–17	(gold) Winner
2023	Benin International	(Uganda) Gladys Mbabazi	(Nigeria) Grace Gabriel (Nigeria) Ramatu Yakubu	20–22, 23–21, 21–18	(gold) Winner
2023	Cameroon International	(Uganda) Gladys Mbabazi	(India) Rutaparna Panda (India) Swetaparna Panda	16–21, 8–21	(silver) Runner-up
2023	Zambia International	(Uganda) Gladys Mbabazi	(South Africa) Amy Ackerman (South Africa) Linda Mazri	13–21, 15–21	(silver) Runner-up

Mixed doubles
Year	Tournament	Partner	Opponent	Score	Result
2021	Uganda International	(Uganda) Brian Kasirye	(Uganda) Daniel Wanagaliya (Uganda) Betty Apio	21–13, 22–20	(gold) Winner

BWF International Challenge tournament
BWF International Series tournament
BWF Future Series tournament

=== Junior International ===
Girls' doubles
Year	Tournament	Partner	Opponent	Score	Result
2018	Uganda Junior International	(Uganda) Tracy Naluwooza	(Algeria) Halla Bouksani (Algeria) Linda Mazri	11–21, 13–21	(silver) Runner-up

Mixed doubles
Year	Tournament	Partner	Opponent	Score	Result
2018	Uganda Junior International	(Uganda) Brian Kasirye	(Algeria) Sifeddine Larbaoui (Algeria) Linda Mazri	21–16, 26–28, 17–21	(silver) Runner-up

BWF Junior International Grand Prix tournament
BWF Junior International Challenge tournament
BWF Junior International Series tournament
BWF Junior Future Series tournament
