= Fadilah Mohamed Rafi =

Ugandan badminton player

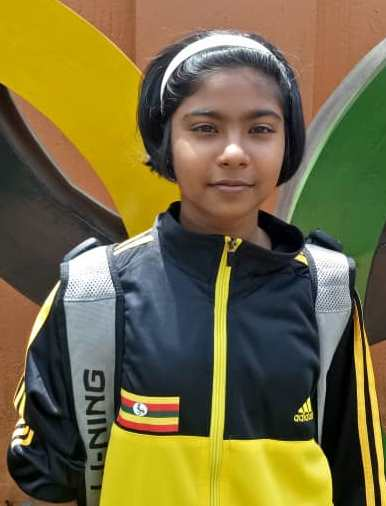
- Fadilah Mohamed Rafi in 2019

Personal information
- Born: Fadilah Shamika Mohamed Rafi; 6 April 2005 (age 21) Tamil Nadu, India

Sport
- Country: Uganda
- Sport: Badminton
- Handedness: Right

Women's singles & doubles
- Highest ranking: 103 (WS, 13 August 2024); 77 (WD with Tracy Naluwooza, 17 September 2024)
- BWF profile
Medal record
Women's badminton
Representing Uganda
African Games
Bronze medal – third place	2023 Accra	Women's singles
African Championships
Gold medal – first place	2023 Benoni	Women's singles
Gold medal – first place	2026 Gaborone	Women's singles
Silver medal – second place	2024 Cairo	Women's singles
Bronze medal – third place	2024 Cairo	Women's doubles
Bronze medal – third place	2025 Douala	Women's singles
Bronze medal – third place	2025 Douala	Women's doubles
Bronze medal – third place	2026 Gaborone	Women's doubles
Africa Women's Team Championships
Silver medal – second place	2022 Kampala	Women's team
Silver medal – second place	2024 Cairo	Women's team
African Junior Championships
Gold medal – first place	2022 Rose Hill	Girls' singles
Gold medal – first place	2022 Rose Hill	Girls' doubles
Gold medal – first place	2022 Rose Hill	Mixed doubles

Fadilah Shamika Mohamed Rafi (born 6 April 2005) is a Ugandan badminton player. She is the African Champions, winning the women's singles title in 2023 and 2026. Started her badminton journey at the age of ten, she went on to win three titles at the 2022 African Junior Championships.

Mohamed Rafi had represented Uganda at the 2022 Commonwealth Games where she played in the women's doubles with Husina Kobugabe. The pair reached the quarter-final where they lost to Chloe Birch and Lauren Smith.

== Achievements ==
=== African Games ===
Women's singles
Year	Venue	Opponent	Score	Result
2023	Borteyman Sports Complex; Accra, Ghana	(South Africa) Johanita Scholtz	15–21, 10–21	Bronze

=== African Championships ===
Women's singles
Year	Venue	Opponent	Score	Result
2023	John Barrable Hall; Benoni, South Africa	(South Africa) Johanita Scholtz	14–21, 21–14, 21–16	Gold
2024	Cairo Stadium Indoor Halls Complex; Cairo, Egypt	(Mauritius) Kate Ludik	Walkover	Silver
2025	Gymnase de Japoma, Douala, Cameroon	(Egypt) Doha Hany	10–21, 20–22	Bronze
2026	Royal Aria; Gaborone, Botswana	(South Africa) Johanita Scholtz	21–17, 16–21, 21–19	Gold

Women's doubles
Year	Venue	Partner	Opponent	Score	Result
2024	Cairo Stadium Indoor Halls Complex; Cairo, Egypt	(Uganda) Tracy Naluwooza	(South Africa) Amy Ackerman (South Africa) Deidre Laurens	Walkover	Bronze
2025	Gymnase de Japoma, Douala, Cameroon	(Uganda) Tracy Naluwooza	(South Africa) Amy Ackerman (South Africa) Johanita Scholtz	15–21, 10–21	Bronze
2026	Royal Aria; Gaborone, Botswana	(Uganda) Tracy Naluwooza	(South Africa) Amy Ackerman (South Africa) Johanita Scholtz	16–21, 10–21	Bronze

=== Africa Junior Championships ===
Women's singles
Year	Venue	Opponent	Score	Result
2022	National Badminton Center; Beau Bassin-Rose Hill, Mauritius	(Uganda) Tracy Naluwooza	21–16, 21–15	Gold

Women's doubles
Year	Venue	Partner	Opponent	Score	Result
2022	National Badminton Center; Beau Bassin-Rose Hill, Mauritius	(Uganda) Tracy Naluwooza	(South Africa) Michaela Ohlson (South Africa) Tamsyn Smith	21–15, 21–17	Gold

Mixed doubles
Year	Venue	Partner	Opponent	Score	Result
2022	National Badminton Center; Beau Bassin-Rose Hill, Mauritius	(Uganda) Abed Bukenya	(Mauritius) Khemtish Rai Nunda (Mauritius) Tiya Bhurtun	21–19, 17–21, 21–17	Gold

=== BWF International Challenge/Series (4 runners-up) ===
Women's doubles
Year	Tournament	Partner	Opponent	Score	Result
2021	Uganda International	(Uganda) Tracy Naluwooza	(Uganda) Husina Kobugabe (Uganda) Mable Namakoye	9–21, 17–21	(silver) Runner-up
2023	Uganda International	(Uganda) Tracy Naluwooza	(India) Rutaparna Panda (India) Swetaparna Panda	13–21, 8–21	(silver) Runner-up
2024	Kampala International	(Uganda) Tracy Naluwooza	(India) Gayatri Rawat (India) Mansa Rawat	5–21, 11–21	(silver) Runner-up
2025	Uganda International Series	(Uganda) Tracy Naluwooza	(Switzerland) Jenjira Stadelmann (Switzerland) Leila Zarrouk	13–21, 5–21	(silver) Runner-up

BWF International Challenge tournament
BWF International Series tournament
BWF Future Series tournament

=== BWF Junior International (2 titles, 1 runner-up) ===
Girls' singles
Year	Tournament	Opponent	Score	Result
2022	South Africa Junior International	(Chinese Taipei) Pei Chen Huang	21–23, 8-21	(silver) Runner-up

Girls' doubles
Year	Tournament	Partner	Opponent	Score	Result
2022	Uganda Junior International	(Uganda) Tracy Naluwooza	(Uganda) Diya Chetan Modi (Uganda) Brenda Namanya	21–5, 21–3	(gold) Winner

Mixed doubles
Year	Tournament	Partner	Opponent	Score	Result
2022	Uganda Junior International	(Uganda) Paul Makande	(Uganda) Abed Bukenya (Uganda) Tracy Naluwooza	21–15, 21–14	(gold) Winner

BWF Junior International Grand Prix tournament
BWF Junior International Challenge tournament
BWF Junior International Series tournament
BWF Junior Future Series tournament
