= Ramatu Yakubu =

Nigerian badminton player (born 1999)

Personal information
- Born: 27 March 1999 (age 27)

Sport
- Country: Nigeria
- Sport: Badminton

Women's singles & doubles
- Highest ranking: 333 (WS 31 May 2018); 190 (WD 21 September 2017); 394 (XD 19 July 2018)
- BWF profile
Medal record
Women's badminton
Representing Nigeria
Africa Team Championships
Bronze medal – third place	2024 Cairo	Women's team
African Youth Games
Bronze medal – third place	2018 Algiers	Girls' singles
Bronze medal – third place	2018 Algiers	Girls' team

Ramatu Yakubu (born 27 March 1999) is a Nigerian badminton player. Yakubu won bronze medals at the 2018 African Youth Games in the girls' singles and team events.

== Career ==
In 2017, Yakubu competed at the Benin International badminton championships in Cotonou, Benin Republic, and finished as semi-finalists in the women's doubles and mixed doubles events. She later finished as women's doubles runner-up in Lagos International partnered with Zainab Momoh. In 2020, she was registered by the Badminton Federation of Nigeria to compete at the 2020 All Africa Women's Team Championships, but she missed the competition due to team visa application was delayed by the Egyptian Embassy.

== Achievements ==
=== African Youth Games ===
Girls' singles

Year	Venue	Opponent	Score	Result
2018	Salle Protection-Civile de Dar El-Beïda, Algiers, Algeria	(Algeria) Linda Mazri	22–20, 15–21, 18–12	Bronze

=== BWF International Challenge/Series (2 runner-up) ===
Women's doubles

Year	Tournament	Partner	Opponent	Score	Result
2017	Lagos International	(Nigeria) Zainab Momoh	(Sri Lanka) Thilini Hendahewa (Sri Lanka) Kavidi Sirimannage	8–21, 5–21	(silver) Runner-up
2023	Benin International	(Nigeria) Grace Gabriel	(Uganda) Husina Kobugabe (Uganda) Gladys Mbabazi	22–20, 21–23, 18–21	(silver) Runner-up

BWF International Challenge tournament
BWF International Series tournament
BWF Future Series tournament
