= Linda Mazri =

Algerian badminton player (born 2001)

Personal information
- Born: 21 December 2001 (age 24) El Biar, Algiers, Algeria
- Years active: 2011–
- Height: 172 cm (5 ft 8 in)

Sport
- Country: Algeria
- Sport: Badminton
- Handedness: Right
- Event: Doubles

Doubles
- BWF profile
Medal record
Women's badminton
Representing Algeria
African Games
Gold medal – first place	2019 Rabat	Mixed doubles
Silver medal – second place	2019 Rabat	Mixed team
African Championships
Gold medal – first place	2018 Algiers	Mixed doubles
Gold medal – first place	2019 Port Harcourt	Mixed doubles
Silver medal – second place	2020 Cairo	Mixed doubles
Silver medal – second place	2023 Benoni	Women's doubles
Silver medal – second place	2025 Douala	Women's doubles
Bronze medal – third place	2018 Algiers	Women's doubles
Bronze medal – third place	2026 Gaborone	Women's doubles
Africa Mixed Team Championships
Gold medal – first place	2025 Douala	Mixed team
Silver medal – second place	2021 Kampala	Mixed team
Bronze medal – third place	2023 Benoni	Mixed team
Africa Women's Team Championships
Silver medal – second place	2020 Cairo	Women's team
Bronze medal – third place	2018 Algiers	Women's team
Bronze medal – third place	2024 Cairo	Women's team
Bronze medal – third place	2026 Gaborone	Women's team
African Youth Games
Gold medal – first place	2018 Algiers	Girls' doubles
Gold medal – first place	2018 Algiers	Girls' team
Silver medal – second place	2018 Algiers	Girls' singles
African Junior Championships
Silver medal – second place	2016 Casablanca	Girls' singles
Silver medal – second place	2016 Casablanca	Girls' doubles
Silver medal – second place	2016 Casablanca	Mixed doubles

Linda Mazri (Arabic: ليندا مازري; born 21 December 2001) is an Algerian badminton player. She is the gold medalist in African Games and African Championships.

== Career ==
Mazri started representing Algeria at an early age of 13 and competed for the first time with the national team in the Serbian Under-15 International Championship, and at that time won two bronze medals in the singles and women's doubles competitions. Mazri also represented her country in the African Under-15 Championship hosted by Egypt and won the bronze medal in the singles category and the silver in the mixed doubles. After that, she participated in the South African International Championships and won the singles bronze and the girls' doubles gold, and in the Uganda International Championship she won the singles gold and the singles bronze as well as won many medals and titles at the level of singles, doubles and mixed doubles in the Arab championships. Mazri shined in the World Open Championship that was held in Algeria in 2017 when she won the gold of mixed doubles and the bronze of the girls' doubles, and in the following year, in the African Games, she won the gold of mixed doubles, and she repeated the same thing in the African Championship held in Nigeria 2019 by winning gold in Mixed doubles, bronze in Women's doubles event and qualified for the World Championships in China in 2018.

== Achievements ==
=== African Games ===
Mixed doubles
Year	Venue	Partner	Opponent	Score	Result
2019	Ain Chock Indoor Sports Center; Casablanca, Morocco	(Algeria) Koceila Mammeri	(Egypt) Adham Hatem Elgamal (Egypt) Doha Hany	21–19, 21–16	Gold

=== African Championships ===
Women's doubles
Year	Venue	Partner	Opponent	Score	Result
2018	Salle OMS Harcha Hacéne; Algiers, Algeria	(Algeria) Halla Bouksani	(Seychelles) Allisen Camille (Seychelles) Juliette Ah-Wan	16–21, 19–21	Bronze
2023	John Barrable Hall; Benoni, South Africa	(Algeria) Yasmina Chibah	(South Africa) Amy Ackerman (South Africa) Deidre Laurens	19–21, 12–21	Silver
2025	Gymnase de Japoma, Douala, Cameroon	(Algeria) Yasmina Chibah	(South Africa) Amy Ackerman (South Africa) Johanita Scholtz	22–24, 10–21	Silver
2026	Royal Aria; Gaborone, Botswana	(Algeria) Yasmina Chibah	(Egypt) Nour Ahmed Youssri (Egypt) Doha Hany	22–20, 11–21, 9–21	Bronze

Mixed doubles
Year	Venue	Partner	Opponent	Score	Result
2018	Salle OMS Harcha Hacéne; Algiers, Algeria	(Algeria) Koceila Mammeri	(Nigeria) Enejoh Abah (Nigeria) Peace Orji	21–17, 15–21, 21–12	Gold
2019	Alfred Diete-Spiff Centre; Port Harcourt, Nigeria	(Algeria) Koceila Mammeri	(Nigeria) Enejoh Abah (Nigeria) Peace Orji	15–21, 21–16, 21–18	Gold
2020	Cairo Stadium Hall 2 Cairo, Egypt	(Algeria) Koceila Mammeri	(Egypt) Adham Hatem Elgamal (Egypt) Doha Hany	13–21, 21–18, 19–21	Silver

=== African Youth Games ===
Girls' singles
Year	Venue	Opponent	Score	Result
2018	Salle Protection-Civile de Dar El-Beïda; Algiers, Algeria	(Algeria) Halla Bouksani	15–21, 12–21	Silver

Girls' doubles
Year	Venue	Partner	Opponent	Score	Result
2018	Salle Protection-Civile de Dar El-Beïda; Algiers, Algeria	(Algeria) Halla Bouksani	(Mauritius) Jemimah Leung For Sang (Mauritius) Ganesha Mungrah	21–17, 21–17	Gold

=== African Junior Championships ===
Girls' singles
Year	Venue	Opponent	Score	Result
2016	Casablanca, Morocco	(Algeria) Halla Bouksani	10–21, 9–21	Silver

Girls' doubles
Year	Venue	Partner	Opponent	Score	Result
2016	Casablanca, Morocco	(Algeria) Sirine Ibrahim	(South Africa) Johanita Scholtz (South Africa) Zani van der Merwe	21–23, 21–18, 16–21	Silver

Mixed doubles
Year	Venue	Partner	Opponent	Score	Result
2016	Casablanca, Morocco	(Algeria) Samy Khaldi	(Algeria) Yacine Belhouane (Algeria) Sirine Ibrahim	14–21, 15–21	Silver

=== BWF International Challenge/Series (6 runners-up) ===
Women's singles
Year	Tournament	Opponent	Score	Result
2018	Algeria International	(Algeria) Halla Bouksani	9–21, 12–21	(silver) Runner-up

Women's doubles
Year	Tournament	Partner	Opponent	Score	Result
2017	Ethiopia International	(Algeria) Halla Bouksani	(Sri Lanka) Lekha Shehani (Sri Lanka) Waduthantri Kavindika Binari de Silva	12–21, 21–19, 8–21	(silver) Runner-up
2018	Algeria International	(Algeria) Halla Bouksani	(Egypt) Doha Hany (Egypt) Hadia Hosny	19–21, 11–21	(silver) Runner-up
2023	Egypt International	(Algeria) Yasmina Chibah	(Germany) Julia Meyer (Germany) Leona Michalski	21–19, 11–21, 14–21	(silver) Runner-up
2023	Algeria International	(Algeria) Yasmina Chibah	(South Africa) Amy Ackerman (South Africa) Deidre Laurens	19–21, 12–21	(silver) Runner-up

Mixed doubles
Year	Tournament	Partner	Opponent	Score	Result
2017	Ethiopia International	(Algeria) Sifeddine Larbaoui	(Israel) Misha Zilberman (Israel) Svetlana Zilberman	Walkover	(silver) Runner-up

BWF International Challenge tournament
BWF International Series tournament
BWF Future Series tournament

=== BWF Junior International ===
Girls' singles
Year	Tournament	Opponent	Score	Result
2018	Uganda Junior International	(Algeria) Halla Bouksani	21–13, 14–21, 14–21	(silver) Runner-up
2017	Mauritius Junior International	(Algeria) Halla Bouksani	14–21, 8–21	(silver) Runner-up
2017	Ivory Coast Junior International	(Algeria) Halla Bouksani	15–21, 9–21	(silver) Runner-up

Girls' doubles
Year	Tournament	Partner	Opponent	Score	Result
2018	Uganda Junior International	(Algeria) Halla Bouksani	(Uganda) Husina Kobugabe (Uganda) Tracy Naluwooza	21–11, 21–13	(gold) Winner
2017	South Africa Junior International	(Algeria) Halla Bouksani	(South Africa) Johanita Scholtz (South Africa) Megan de Beer	21–14, 16–21, 21–19	(gold) Winner
2017	Zambia Junior International	(Algeria) Halla Bouksani	(Mauritius) Sendila Mourat (Mauritius) Shania Leung	21–16, 21–14	(gold) Winner
2017	Algeria Junior International	(Algeria) Halla Bouksani	(Egypt) Malak Basem Sobhy Ebrahim (Egypt) Nour Ahmed Youssri	21–18, 21–9	(gold) Winner
2017	Egypt Junior International	(Algeria) Halla Bouksani	(Egypt) Jana Ashraf (Egypt) Esraa Mohamed Hany	21–11, 21–11	(gold) Winner
2017	Mauritius Junior International	(Algeria) Halla Bouksani	(Mauritius) Kritisha Mungrah (Mauritius) Vilina Appiah	21–14, 21–9	(gold) Winner
2017	Ivory Coast Junior International	(Algeria) Halla Bouksani	(Ghana) Eyram Yaa Migbodzi (Ghana) Grace Annabel Atipaka	21–7, 21–15	(gold) Winner

Mixed doubles
Year	Tournament	Partner	Opponent	Score	Result
2018	Uganda Junior International	(Algeria) Sifeddine Larbaoui	(Uganda) Brian Kasirye (Uganda) Husina Kobugabe	16–21, 28–26, 21–17	(gold) Winner
2017	Algeria Junior International	(Algeria) Sifeddine Larbaoui	(Egypt) Mohamed Mostafa Kamel (Egypt) Hana Hesham Mohamed	21–11, 21–3	(gold) Winner
2017	Ivory Coast Junior International	(Algeria) Sifeddine Larbaoui	(Egypt) Montaser Mahmoud (Egypt) Jana Ashraf	19–21, 24–22, 21–17	(gold) Winner

BWF Junior International Grand Prix tournament
BWF Junior International Challenge tournament
BWF Junior International Series tournament
BWF Junior Future Series tournament
