= Chongo Mulenga =

Zambian badminton player (born 1998)

Personal information
- Born: Chongo Ezra Mulenga; 19 August 1998 (age 27) Ndola, Zambia
- Height: 1.76 m (5 ft 9 in)
- Weight: 60 kg (132 lb)

Sport
- Country: Zambia
- Sport: Badminton

Men's singles & doubles
- Highest ranking: 240 (MS 15 June 2017); 118 (MD 22 June 2017); 215 (XD 5 April 2018)
- BWF profile
Medal record
Men's badminton
Representing Zambia
African Championships
Silver medal – second place	2026 Gaborone	Men's doubles
Africa Mixed Team Championships
Bronze medal – third place	2017 Benoni	Mixed team
Africa Men's Team Championships
Bronze medal – third place	2026 Gaborone	Men's team

Chongo Ezra Mulenga (born 19 August 1998) is a Zambian badminton player. He is a silver medalist in the men's doubles at the 2026 African Championships. In 2013, he won the men's singles title at the Ethiopia International tournament. In 2014, he placed third at the Uganda International in the mixed doubles event partnered with Ogar Siamupangila. Mulenga represented his country at the 2014 and 2018 Commonwealth Games.

== Achievements ==
=== African Championships ===
Men's doubles

Year	Venue	Partner	Opponent	Score	Result
2026	Royal Aria, Gaborone, Botswana	(Zambia) Kalombo Mulenga	(Algeria) Koceila Mammeri (Algeria) Youcef Sabri Medel	16–21, 19–21	Silver

=== BWF International Challenge/Series ===
Men's singles

Year	Tournament	Opponent	Score	Result
2013	Ethiopia International	(Egypt) Adham Hatem Elgamal	12–21, 21–19, 21–18	(gold) Winner

BWF International Challenge tournament
BWF International Series tournament
BWF Future Series tournament
