= Halla Bouksani =

Algerian badminton player

Personal information
- Born: 30 July 2000 (age 26) Kouba, Algiers, Algeria
- Years active: 2013–
- Height: 165 cm (5 ft 5 in)

Sport
- Country: Algeria
- Sport: Badminton
- Handedness: Right
- Event: Women's singles & doubles

Women's singles & doubles
- BWF profile
Medal record
Women's badminton
Representing Algeria
African Games
Silver medal – second place	2019 Rabat	Mixed team
Silver medal – second place	2023 Accra	Women's doubles
African Championships
Gold medal – first place	2025 Douala	Mixed team
Silver medal – second place	2021 Kampala	Mixed team
Bronze medal – third place	2018 Algiers	Women's doubles
Africa Team Championships
Silver medal – second place	2020 Cairo	Women's team
Bronze medal – third place	2018 Algiers	Women's team
Bronze medal – third place	2024 Cairo	Women's team
Bronze medal – third place	2026 Gaborone	Women's team
African Youth Games
Gold medal – first place	2018 Algiers	Girls' doubles
Gold medal – first place	2018 Algiers	Girls' team
Gold medal – first place	2018 Algiers	Girls' singles
African Junior Championships
Gold medal – first place	2016 Casablanca	Girls' singles

Halla Bouksani (Arabic: حلا البوكساني; born 30 July 2000) is an Algerian badminton player who made her International debut in 2013 and is a National team member since 2009.

== Achievements ==
=== African Games ===
Women's doubles
Year	Venue	Partner	Opponent	Score	Result
2023	Borteyman Sports Complex; Accra, Ghana	(Algeria) Tanina Mammeri	(Uganda) Husina Kobugabe (Uganda) Gladys Mbabazi	21–23, 14–21	Silver

=== African Championships ===
Women's doubles
Year	Venue	Partner	Opponent	Score	Result
2018	Salle OMS Harcha Hacéne; Algiers, Algeria	(Algeria) Linda Mazri	(Seychelles) Allisen Camille (Seychelles) Juliette Ah-Wan	16–21, 19–21	Bronze

=== African Youth Games ===
Girls' singles
Year	Venue	Opponent	Score	Result
2018	Salle Protection-Civile de Dar El-Beïda, Algiers, Algeria	(Algeria) Linda Mazri	21–15, 21–12	Gold

Girls' doubles
Year	Venue	Partner	Opponent	Score	Result
2018	Salle Protection-Civile de Dar El-Beïda; Algiers, Algeria	(Algeria) Linda Mazri	(Mauritius) Jemimah Leung For Sang (Mauritius) Ganesha Mungrah	21–17, 21–17	Gold

=== African Junior Championships ===
Girls' singles
Year	Venue	Opponent	Score	Result
2016	Casablanca, Morocco	(Algeria) Linda Mazri	21–10, 21–9	Gold

=== BWF International ===
Women's singles
Year	Tournament	Opponent	Score	Result
2018	Algeria International	(Algeria) Linda Mazri	21–9, 21–12	(gold) Winner

Women's doubles
Year	Tournament	Partner	Opponent	Score	Result
2017	Ethiopia International	(Algeria) Linda Mazri	(Sri Lanka) Lekha Shehani (Sri Lanka) Kavindika de Silva	12–21, 21–19, 8–21	(silver) Runner-up
2018	Algeria International	(Algeria) Linda Mazri	(Egypt) Doha Hany (Egypt) Hadia Hosny	19–21, 11–21	(silver) Runner-up

BWF International Challenge tournament
BWF International Series tournament
BWF Future Series tournament

=== BWF Junior International ===
Girls' singles
Year	Tournament	Opponent	Score	Result
2017	Ivory Coast Junior International	(Algeria) Linda Mazri	21–15, 21–9	(gold) Winner
2017	Mauritius Junior International	(Algeria) Linda Mazri	21–14, 21–8	(gold) Winner
2017	Egypt Junior International	(Egypt) Jana Ashraf	21–18, 21–12	(gold) Winner
2017	Algeria Junior International	(Czech Republic) Veronika Dobiášová	16–21, 12–21	(silver) Runner-up
2017	Zambia Junior International	(Egypt) Jana Ashraf	21–15, 14–21, 21–17	(gold) Winner
2017	South Africa Junior International	(South Africa) Johanita Scholtz	21–12, 8–21, 21–19	(gold) Winner
2018	Uganda Junior International	(Algeria) Linda Mazri	13–21, 21–14, 21–14	(gold) Winner
2018	Dubai Junior International	(India) Tanya Hemanth	8–21, 11–21	(silver) Runner-up

Girls' doubles
Year	Tournament	Partner	Opponent	Score	Result
2017	Ivory Coast Junior International	(Algeria) Linda Mazri	(Ghana) Eyram Yaa Migbodzi (Ghana) Grace Annabel Atipaka	21–7, 21–15	(gold) Winner
2017	Mauritius Junior International	(Algeria) Linda Mazri	(Mauritius) Kritisha Mungrah (Mauritius) Vilina Appiah	21–14, 21–9	(gold) Winner
2017	Egypt Junior International	(Algeria) Linda Mazri	(Egypt) Jana Ashraf (Egypt) Esraa Mohamed Hany	21–11, 21–11	(gold) Winner
2017	Algeria Junior International	(Algeria) Linda Mazri	(Egypt) Malak Basem Sobhy Ebrahim (Egypt) Nour Ahmed Youssri	21–18, 21–9	(gold) Winner
2017	Zambia Junior International	(Algeria) Linda Mazri	(Mauritius) Sendila Mourat (Mauritius) Shania Leung	21–16, 21–14	(gold) Winner
2017	South Africa Junior International	(Algeria) Linda Mazri	(South Africa) Johanita Scholtz (South Africa) Megan de Beer	21–14, 16–21, 21–19	(gold) Winner
2018	Uganda Junior International	(Algeria) Linda Mazri	(Uganda) Husina Kobugabe (Uganda) Tracy Naluwooza	21–11, 21–13	(gold) Winner

BWF Junior International Grand Prix tournament
BWF Junior International Challenge tournament
BWF Junior International Series tournament
BWF Junior Future Series tournament
