= Nour Ahmed Youssri =

Egyptian badminton player (born 2003)

Personal information
- Born: 17 July 2003 (age 23)
- Height: 162 cm (5 ft 4 in)

Sport
- Country: Egypt
- Sport: Badminton
- Handedness: Right
- Coached by: Luka Zdenjak

Women's singles & doubles
- Highest ranking: 116 (WS, 18 October 2023); 109 (WD with Doha Hany, 24 February 2026)
- BWF profile
Medal record
Women's badminton
Representing Egypt
African Games
Bronze medal – third place	2023 Accra	Women's doubles
Bronze medal – third place	2019 Rabat	Mixed team
African Championships
Gold medal – first place	2022 Kampala	Women's singles
Gold medal – first place	2025 Douala	Women's singles
Silver medal – second place	2026 Gaborone	Women's doubles
Bronze medal – third place	2026 Gaborone	Women's singles
Bronze medal – third place	2022 Kampala	Women's doubles
Africa Mixed Team Championships
Gold medal – first place	2021 Kampala	Mixed team
Gold medal – first place	2023 Benoni	Mixed team
Bronze medal – third place	2019 Port Harcourt	Mixed team
Bronze medal – third place	2025 Douala	Mixed team
Africa Women's Team Championships
Gold medal – first place	2020 Cairo	Women's team
Gold medal – first place	2022 Kampala	Women's team
Silver medal – second place	2026 Gaborone	Women's team
Arab Championships
Gold medal – first place	2024 Riyadh	Women's singles
African Youth Games
Silver medal – second place	2018 Algiers	Girls' team
African Junior Championships
Gold medal – first place	2021 Catonou	Girls' singles
Silver medal – second place	2021 Catonou	Girls' doubles
Bronze medal – third place	2021 Catonou	Mixed doubles

Nour Ahmed Youssri Mohamed Latif (Arabic: نور أحمد يسري محمد لطيف; born 17 July 2003) is an Egyptian badminton player.

== Career ==
Initially interested in ballet and swimming, Youssri developed interest in badminton at the age of 7 while watching her friends playing. Her parents were both sportspersons themselves.

She became African champion in 2022 in the women's singles discipline, at just 18 years of age. She was coached by Abdelrahman Kashkal at that time.

She sustained left achilles injury in February 2023, ruling herself out of the possible Olympic spot in the 2024 Summer Olympics. In 2025, she relocated to Paris and began training at Athletic Club Boulogne Billiancourt under guidance of Luka Zdenjak. Same year she went on to win her second African championship title in women's singles discipline.

She idolises Carolina Marín.

== Achievements ==
=== African Games ===
Women's doubles
Year	Venue	Partner	Opponent	Score	Result
2023	Borteyman Sports Complex; Accra, Ghana	(Egypt) Doha Hany	(Uganda) Husina Kobugabe (Uganda) Gladys Mbabazi	14–21, 14–21	Bronze

=== African Championships ===
Women's singles
Year	Venue	Opponent	Score	Result
2022	Lugogo Arena, Kampala, Uganda	(Egypt) Doha Hany	21–16, 21–16	Gold
2025	Gymnase de Japoma, Douala, Cameroon	(Egypt) Doha Hany	21–7, 21–14	Gold
2026	Royal Aria; Gaborone, Botswana	(South Africa) Johanita Scholtz	21–18, 21–23, 14–21	Bronze

Women's doubles
Year	Venue	Partner	Opponent	Score	Result
2022	Lugogo Arena; Kampala, Uganda	(Egypt) Doha Hany	(South Africa) Amy Ackerman (South Africa) Deidré Laurens	10–21, 19–21	Bronze
2026	Royal Aria; Gaborone, Botswana	(Egypt) Doha Hany	(South Africa) Amy Ackerman (South Africa) Johanita Scholtz	18–21, 17–21	Silver

=== African Junior Championships ===
Women's singles
Year	Venue	Opponent	Score	Result
2021	Stade de l'Amitié Badminton Hall, Cotonou, Benin	(South Africa) Amy Ackerman	21–13, 21–15	Gold

Women's doubles
Year	Venue	Partner	Opponent	Score	Result
2021	Stade de l'Amitié Badminton Hall; Cotonou, Benin	(Egypt) Jana Abdelkader	(South Africa) Amy Ackerman (South Africa) Diane Olivier	19–21, 24–26	Silver

Mixed doubles
Year	Venue	Partner	Opponent	Score	Result
2021	Stade de l'Amitié Badminton Hall; Cotonou, Benin	(Egypt) Ahmed Elbahnasawy	(South Africa) Caden Kakora (South Africa) Diane Olivier	16–21, 17–21	Bronze

=== International Challenge/Series (5 runners-up) ===
Women's singles
Year	Tournament	Opponent	Score	Result
2023	South Africa International	(Mauritius) Kate Foo Kune	16–21, 14–21	(silver) Runner-up
2023	Benin International	(South Africa) Johanita Scholtz	17–21, 22–20, 19–21	(silver) Runner-up

Women's doubles
Year	Tournament	Partner	Opponent	Score	Result
2019	Zambia International	(Egypt) Jana Ashraf	(Egypt) Doha Hany (Egypt) Hadia Hosny	9–21, 11–21	(silver) Runner-up
2022	Benin International	(Egypt) Jana Abdelkader	(Philippines) Alyssa Leonardo (Philippines) Thea Pomar	13–21, 7–21	(silver) Runner-up

Mixed doubles
Year	Tournament	Partner	Opponent	Score	Result
2025	Zambia International	(Egypt) Ezzat Kareem	(Maldives) Hussein Shaheed (Maldives) Fathimath Nabaaha Abdul Razzaq	18–21, 20–22	(silver) Runner-up

BWF International Challenge tournament
BWF International Series tournament
BWF Future Series tournament
