= Morocco national badminton team =

National badminton team representing Morocco

Morocco
- Association: Moroccan Royal Badminton Federation (FRMB)
- Confederation: BCA (Africa)
- President: Omar Bellali

BWF ranking
- Current ranking: 114 (2 April 2024)
- Highest ranking: 70 (5 April 2012)

Sudirman Cup
- Appearances: 2 (first in 1995)
- Best result: Group stage

African Mixed Team Championships
- Appearances: 5 (first in 2002)
- Best result: Group stage

African Men's Team Championships
- Appearances: 1 (first in 2018)
- Best result: Quarter-finals (2018)

The Morocco national badminton team (Arabic: المنتخب المغربي لكرة الريشة; Standard Moroccan Tamazight: ⵟⴰⵖⵍⴰⵎⵜ ⵜⴰⵖⵍⵏⴰⵡⵜ ⵍⵎⵖⵔⵉⴱ ⴱⴰⴷⵎⵉⵏⵜⵓⵏ, romanized: Taɣlamt taɣelnawt lmɣrib badminton) represents Morocco in international badminton team competitions. The team is controlled by the Moroccan Royal Badminton Federation, the governing body of badminton in Morocco.

The team was formed in 1992 after the founding of the Moroccan Royal Badminton Federation. Morocco became the second African team to compete in the Sudirman Cup when the team made their first appearance in the tournament in 1995. Morocco made their first appearance at the African Badminton Championships in 2002 when it hosted the tournament in Casablanca.

In 2020, the Badminton World Federation suspended the membership of the Moroccan Royal Badminton Federation due to the disputes within the association. As a result to this ban, Moroccan players cannot compete under the national flag. Two of Morocco's delegates at the 2024 African Badminton Championships, Driss Bourroum and Anas Idlahoucine competed in the championships as neutrals.

== History ==
=== Men's team ===
In 2006, Morocco took part in qualifying for the Thomas Cup at the 2006 Thomas Cup African Qualifiers. The team failed to qualify for the Cup after losing 5–0 to South Africa, Mauritius and Zambia. The team then lost 3–2 to Seychelles but defeated Kenya to finish in 5th place in the round robin tie.

In 2017, the team competed in the 2017 Arab Badminton Championships men's team event and finished in third place behind Bahrain and Algeria. In 2018, the team competed in the 2018 African Men's Team Championships. The team were drawn into Group C with Nigeria and Seychelles. The team placed second in their group and qualified for the quarter-finals after defeating Seychelles 3–2. The team faced Nigeria for a second time in the quarter-finals and lost 3–0 to the Nigerians.

In the 2020 African Men's Team Championships, the team were drawn to Group B with Egypt, South Africa, Cameroon and Sierra Leone. The team first lost 5–0 to Egypt, then beat Cameroon 5–0 to keep their hopes up for an appearance in the knockout stage. The team failed to qualify for the next round after losing 3–2 to South Africa.

=== Women's team ===
Morocco competed in the women's team event at the 2009 Arab Badminton Championships and finished in fifth place. Morocco competed in the 2012 Uber Cup African Qualifiers. The team were drawn into Group B with Nigeria and Egypt. They did not advance to the knockout stage after losing 5–0 to both teams in the group.

=== Mixed team ===
Morocco made their debut at the Sudirman Cup in 1995. The team were placed in Group 11 with Slovakia, Malta, Brazil and Argentina. The team lost 5–0 to all of their opponents and finished on the bottom of the group. The team finished in 49th place at the overall rankings. In 2001, the team made their second appearance at the Sudirman Cup. Drawn into Group 7A, the team lost 5–0 to Luxembourg and Mexico but beat the IBF team 3–2. In the playoff for 51st place, the team lost 3–1 to Greenland.

In 2002, Morocco hosted the 2002 African Badminton Championships and competed in the team events. The team did not make it past the group stage. The team also competed in the African Mixed Team Championships in 2006, 2009, 2011 and 2013 but were never able to qualify for the knockout stage. In 2019, Morocco debuted in the African Games team event. The team were drawn into Group B with Mauritius and Kenya. The team failed to advance to the next round after being eliminated by Mauritius and Kenya in the group stage.

== Competitive record ==
=== Thomas Cup ===
Year	Round	Pos
1949 to 1955	Protectorate of France	
1958 to 2004	Did not enter	
2006	Did not qualify	
2008	Did not enter	
2010	Did not enter	
2012	Did not enter	
2014	Did not enter	
2016	Did not enter	
2018	Did not qualify	
2020	Did not qualify	
2022	Did not enter	
2024	Did not enter	
2026	To be determined	
2028	To be determined	
2030	To be determined	

=== Uber Cup ===
Year	Round	Pos
1957 to 2010	Did not enter	
2012	Did not qualify	
2014	Did not enter	
2016	Did not enter	
2018	Did not enter	
2020	Did not enter	
2022	Did not enter	
2024	Did not enter	
2026	To be determined	
2028	To be determined	
2030	To be determined	

=== Sudirman Cup ===
Year	Round	Pos
1989 to 1993	Did not enter	
1995	Group stage	49th
1997	Did not enter	
1999	Did not enter	
2001	Group stage	52nd
2003	Did not enter	
2005	Did not enter	
2007	Did not enter	
2009	Did not enter	
2011	Did not enter	
2013	Did not enter	
2015	Did not enter	
2017	Did not enter	
2019	Did not enter	
2021	Did not enter	
2023	Did not enter	
2025	Did not enter	
2027	TBD	
2029	TBD	

=== African Games ===
==== Mixed team ====
Year	Round	Pos
2003	Did not enter	
2007	Did not enter	
2011	Did not enter	
2015	Did not enter	
2019	Group stage	9th
2027	To be determined	

=== African Team Championships ===
==== Men's team ====
Year	Round	Pos
1979 to 2016	Did not enter	
2018	Quarter-finals	8th
2020	Group stage	5th
2022	Did not enter	
2024	Did not enter	
2026	To be determined	
2028	To be determined	
2030	To be determined	

==== Women's team ====
Year	Round	Pos
1979 to 2024	Did not enter	
2026	To be determined	
2028	To be determined	
2030	To be determined	

==== Mixed team ====
Year	Round	Pos
1980 to 2000	Did not enter	
2002	Group stage	9th
2004	Did not enter	
2006	Group stage	8th
2007	Did not enter	
2009	Group stage	8th
2011	Group stage	9th
2013	Group stage	9th
2014	Did not enter	
2017	Did not enter	
2019	Did not enter	
2021	Did not enter	
2023	Did not enter	
2025	To be determined	
2027	To be determined	
2029	To be determined	

=== Arab Games ===
==== Men's team ====
Year	Round	Pos
1999	Did not enter	
2004	Did not enter	
2007	Did not enter	

==== Women's team ====
Year	Round	Pos
1999	Did not enter	
2004	Did not enter	
2007	Did not enter	

=== Arab Team Championships ===
==== Men's team ====
Year	Round	Pos
1996	Did not enter	
1998	Did not enter	
2000	Did not enter	
2002	Did not enter	
2004	Did not enter	
2009	Group stage	6th
2011	Did not enter	
2017	Third place	3rd

==== Women's team ====
Year	Round	Pos
1996	Did not enter	
1998	Did not enter	
2000	Did not enter	
2002	Did not enter	
2004	Did not enter	
2009	Group stage	5th
2011	Did not enter	
2017	Did not enter	

**Red border color indicates tournament was held on home soil.

== Junior competitive record ==
=== Suhandinata Cup ===
Year	Round	Pos
2000 to 2024	Did not enter	
2025	To be determined	

=== African Youth Games ===
==== Men's team ====
Year	Round	Pos
2018	Group stage	7th

==== Women's team ====
Year	Round	Pos
2018	Did not enter	

==== Mixed team ====
Year	Round	Pos
2014	Did not enter	

=== African Junior Team Championships ===
==== Mixed team ====
Year	Round	Pos
1979 to 1999	Did not enter	
2001	Group stage	
2003	Group stage	
2005	Group stage	
2007	Did not enter	
2009	Did not enter	
2013	Group stage	8th
2016	Group stage	
2021	Did not enter	
2022	Did not enter	
2024	To be determined	

=== Arab Junior Team Championships ===
==== Men's team ====
Year	Round	Pos
2003	Did not enter	
2005	Did not enter	
2007	Did not enter	
2009	Did not enter	
2016	Did not enter	

==== Women's team ====
Year	Round	Pos
2003	Did not enter	
2005	Did not enter	
2007	Did not enter	
2009	Did not enter	
2016	Did not enter	

**Red border color indicates tournament was held on home soil.

== Players ==
=== Current squad ===
As of 2 January 2024

==== Men's team ====
Name	DoB/Age	Ranking of event		
Name	DoB/Age	MS	MD	XD
Imrane Bellamou	22 February 2000 (age 25)	-	-	-
Driss Bourroum	16 January 2002 (age 23)	-	-	-
Bilal El Harab	9 March 1995 (age 30)	-	-	-
Anas Idlahoucine	20 December 1996 (age 28)	-	-	-
Youssef Oubella	8 April 1995 (age 30)	-	-	-

==== Women's team ====
Name	DoB/Age	Ranking of event		
Name	DoB/Age	WS	WD	XD
Oumaima El Herz	14 March 1997 (age 28)	-	-	-
Ghita Abdel Wahid	6 August 1996 (age 29)	-	-	-
Houda Erraihani	21 September 2001 (age 24)	-	-	-
Khawla Makrane	5 January 1998 (age 27)	-	-	-
Jinane Bitarie	8 February 1993 (age 32)	-	-	-
