= Togo national badminton team =

Togolese national badminton team

Togo
- Association: Fédération Togolaise de Badminton (FETOBAD)
- Confederation: BCA (Africa)
- President: Takassi Kikpa Tikoyabe

BWF ranking
- Current ranking: 115 ▲3 (2 April 2024)
- Highest ranking: 95 (5 July 2018)

African Mixed Team Championships
- Appearances: 1 (first in 2019)
- Best result: Group stage

The Togo national badminton team (French: Équipe nationale de badminton du Togo; Ewe: Ẹgbẹ badminton orilẹ-ede Togo) represents Togo in international team competitions. The Togolese Badminton Federation (French: Federation Togolaise de Badminton) controls everything in the national team.

== History ==
Badminton first reached Togo in the late 1990s. Togo was one of the first nations in West Africa to adopt the sport and the first French-speaking African nation to do so. Badminton failed to gain popularity in Togo in the 1990s due to the lack of activities and funding.

In 2012, the Togolese Badminton Federation partnered with the Badminton World Federation and initiated Shuttle Time project to increase the number of badminton players and revitalize the practice of badminton in Togo. The project gave the national team slight success as they were able to send their players to compete internationally at the 2019 African Mixed Team Championships after a long hiatus.

=== Mixed team ===
The Togolese mixed team competed in the 2019 African Mixed Team Championships. The team were drawn to Group C with Algeria, Ghana and Ivory Coast. The Togolese team were eliminated in the group stages after losing all their matches in the group stage.

== Competitive record ==
=== Thomas Cup ===
Year	Round	Pos
1949 to 1958	Part of France	
1961 to 2024	Did not enter	
2026	To be determined	
2028	To be determined	
2030	To be determined	

=== Uber Cup ===
Year	Round	Pos
1957	Part of France	
1960	Part of France	
1963 to 2024	Did not enter	
2026	To be determined	
2028	To be determined	
2030	To be determined	

=== Sudirman Cup ===
Year	Round	Pos
1989 to 2023	Did not enter	
2025	To be determined	
2027	To be determined	
2029	To be determined	

=== African Games ===
==== Mixed team ====
Year	Round	Pos
2003	Did not enter	
2007	Did not enter	
2011	Did not enter	
2015	Did not enter	
2019	Did not enter	
2027	To be determined	

=== African Team Championships ===
==== Men's team ====
Year	Round	Pos
1979 to 2024	Did not enter	
2026	To be determined	
2028	To be determined	
2030	To be determined	

==== Women's team ====
Year	Round	Pos
1979 to 2024	Did not enter	
2026	To be determined	
2028	To be determined	
2030	To be determined	

==== Mixed team ====
Year	Round	Pos
1980 to 2017	Did not enter	
2019	Group stage	
2021	Did not enter	
2023	Did not enter	
2025	To be determined	
2027	To be determined	
2029	To be determined	

**Red border color indicates tournament was held on home soil.

== Junior competitive record ==
=== Suhandinata Cup ===
Year	Round	Pos
2000 to 2024	Did not enter	
2025	To be determined	

=== African Youth Games ===
==== Men's team ====
Year	Round	Pos
2018	Did not enter	

==== Women's team ====
Year	Round	Pos
2018	Did not enter	

==== Mixed team ====
Year	Round	Pos
2014	Did not enter	

=== African Junior Team Championships ===
==== Mixed team ====
Year	Round	Pos
1979 to 2022	Did not enter	
2024	To be determined	

**Red border color indicates tournament was held on home soil.

== Players ==
=== Current squad ===
As of 2 January 2024

==== Men's team ====
Name	DoB/Age	Ranking of event		
Name	DoB/Age	MS	MD	XD
Azim Issa	28 November 1998 (age 26)	1134	1110	973
Edouard Ankou	15 August 2001 (age 23)	1735	1110	973
Mihiradji Tchagafou	14 September 1998 (age 26)	1383	717	–
Koudousse Souleymann	6 February 2008 (age 17)	1623	717	1160
Koami Vivien Amoussou	10 March 2001 (age 24)	–	–	–

==== Women's team ====
Name	DoB/Age	Ranking of event		
Name	DoB/Age	WS	WD	XD
Rolande Adjima	18 April 2004 (age 20)	889	–	973
Ahliba Kuassi-Kpede	3 June 2006 (age 18)	1085	871	973
Akouèvi Odile Djoyagbo	23 May 2006 (age 18)	889	871	1160
Magnim Kpatarou	28 March 2007 (age 18)	–	–	–
Malika Dare	8 December 2001 (age 23)	–	–	–

=== Previous squads ===
==== African Team Championships ====
- Mixed team: 2019
