= 2013 African Junior Badminton Championships =

Tournament details
- Dates: 15–17 April (Team event); 18–20 April (Individual event)
- Edition: 11th
- Venue: Staouéli Hall
- Location: Algiers, Algeria

The 2013 African Junior Badminton Championships were the continental badminton championships to crown the best youth players and teams across Africa. The tournament was held at the Staouéli Hall in Algiers, Algeria, from 15 to 17 April 2013.

== Tournament ==
The 2013 African Junior Badminton Championships were held in two separate events. The mixed team event, officially All Africa U-19 Mixed Team Championships 2013, was a continental tournament to crown the best team in Africa. A total of 8 countries across Africa registered their players to compete at mixed team event.

The individual event, officially All Africa U-19 Individual Championships 2013, was a continental tournament to crown the best players in Africa holding from 18 to 20 April.

=== Venue ===
This tournament was held at the Staouéli Hall in Algiers with four courts.

== Medalists ==
Event	Gold	Silver	Bronze
Teams	South Africa; Cameron Coetzer; Michael Jennings; Reneshan Naidoo; Bongani von Bodenstein; Demi Botha; Lee-Ann de Wet; Anri Schoonees; Janke van der Vyver	Nigeria; Olamid Adebayo; Habeeb Bello; Usman Isiaq; Mustapha Muhammed; Jafar Umar; Dorcas Ajoke Adesokan; Augustina Ebhomien Sunday; Zainab Momoh	Algeria; Reda Belhouane; Yacine Belhouane; Sid Ali Bouksani; Rabah Boulmelha; Samy Gasmi; Amine Guelmaoui; Mestapaha Kessari; Samy Khaldi; Youcef Sabri Medel; Mohamed Anis Ronel; Yasmine Aissani; Nesrine Baya; Halla Bouksani; Lamia Kerkour; Nassima Loukal; Rania Tirouche
Teams	South Africa; Cameron Coetzer; Michael Jennings; Reneshan Naidoo; Bongani von Bodenstein; Demi Botha; Lee-Ann de Wet; Anri Schoonees; Janke van der Vyver	Nigeria; Olamid Adebayo; Habeeb Bello; Usman Isiaq; Mustapha Muhammed; Jafar Umar; Dorcas Ajoke Adesokan; Augustina Ebhomien Sunday; Zainab Momoh	Mauritius; Atul Kassee; Aatish Lubah; Julien Paul; Aurélie Allet; Rheea Dookhee; Shaama Sandooyea
Boys' singles	(Nigeria) Habeeb Bello	(Mauritius) Aatish Lubah	(South Africa) Reneshan Naidoo
Boys' singles	(Nigeria) Habeeb Bello	(Mauritius) Aatish Lubah	(Algeria) Youcef Sabri Medel
Girls' singles	(Nigeria) Dorcas Ajoke Adesokan	(South Africa) Lee-Ann de Wet	(Egypt) Naja Mohamed
Girls' singles	(Nigeria) Dorcas Ajoke Adesokan	(South Africa) Lee-Ann de Wet	(South Africa) Demi Botha
Boys' doubles	(Mauritius) Aatish Lubah (Mauritius) Julien Paul	(Egypt) Youssef Abdel Fatah (Egypt) Abdelrahman Abdelhakim	(Nigeria) Habeeb Bello (Nigeria) Mustapha Muhammed
Boys' doubles	(Mauritius) Aatish Lubah (Mauritius) Julien Paul	(Egypt) Youssef Abdel Fatah (Egypt) Abdelrahman Abdelhakim	(Algeria) Sid Ali Bouksani (Algeria) Youcef Sabri Medel
Girls' doubles	(South Africa) Lee-Ann de Wet (South Africa) Anri Schoonees	(Nigeria) Dorcas Ajoke Adesokan (Nigeria) Augustina Ebhomien Sunday	(Egypt) Toka Elwasary (Egypt) Doha Hany
Girls' doubles	(South Africa) Lee-Ann de Wet (South Africa) Anri Schoonees	(Nigeria) Dorcas Ajoke Adesokan (Nigeria) Augustina Ebhomien Sunday	(Mauritius) Aurélie Allet (Mauritius) Shaama Sandooyea
Mixed doubles	(Mauritius) Julien Paul (Mauritius) Aurélie Allet	(Nigeria) Habeeb Bello (Nigeria) Dorcas Ajoke Adesokan	(South Africa) Bongani von Bodenstein (South Africa) Demi Botha
Mixed doubles	(Mauritius) Julien Paul (Mauritius) Aurélie Allet	(Nigeria) Habeeb Bello (Nigeria) Dorcas Ajoke Adesokan	(Egypt) Youssef Abdel Fatah (Egypt) Toka Elwasary

=== Medal table ===
* Host nation (Algeria)

Rank	Nation	Gold	Silver	Bronze	Total
1	Nigeria	2	2	1	5
2	South Africa	2	1	3	6
3	Mauritius	2	1	2	5
4	Egypt	0	1	3	4
5	Algeria*	0	0	3	3
Totals (5 entries)		6	5	12	23

== Team event ==
=== Group A ===
Pos	Team	Pld	W	L	MF	MA	MD	GF	GA	GD	PF	PA	PD	Pts	Qualification
1	Algeria (H)	3	3	0	12	3	+9	12	6	+6	355	260	+95	3	Advance to Knockout stage
2	Mauritius	3	2	1	10	5	+5	20	11	+9	573	451	+122	2	Advance to Knockout stage
3	Ghana	3	1	2	7	8	−1	15	8	+7	412	346	+66	1	
4	Morocco	3	0	3	1	14	−13	4	26	−22	332	615	−283	0	

Source: tournamentsoftware.com
(H) Host

==== Mauritius vs Ghana ====
Mauritius
3
Staouéli Hall, Court 2
15 April 2013, 10:00 UTC+1

Ghana
2

			1	2	3
1	(Mauritius) (Ghana)	Julien Paul / Aurélie Allet; Mohammed Adam / Diana Archer	21; 14	21; 8
2	(Mauritius) (Ghana)	Shaama Sandooyea; Stella Amasah	10; 21	15; 21
3	(Mauritius) (Ghana)	Aatish Lubah; Mohammed Adam	17; 21	21; 10	21; 16
4	(Mauritius) (Ghana)	Aurélie Allet / Shaama Sandooyea; Stella Amasah / Diana Archer	11; 21	23; 25
5	(Mauritius) (Ghana)	Aatish Lubah / Julien Paul; Lawton Arhin Hamilton / Emmanuel Botwe	21; 5	21; 10

==== Algeria vs Morocco ====
Algeria
4
Staouéli Hall, Court 4
15 April 2013, 10:00 UTC+1

Morocco
1

			1	2	3
1	(Algeria) (Morocco)	Youcef Sabri Medel / Yasmine Aissani; Yassine El-Mernissi / Oumaina Sahdan				w/o
2	(Algeria) (Morocco)	Nesrine Baya; Nour Azzaoui	21; 1	21; 1
3	(Algeria) (Morocco)	Youcef Sabri Medel; Bilal El-Harab	21; 19	21; 12
4	(Algeria) (Morocco)	Nesrine Baya / Yasmine Aissani; Nour Azzaoui / Oumaina Sahdan	21; 6			retired
5	(Algeria) (Morocco)	Sid Ali Bouksani / Rabah Boulmelha; Bilal El-Harab / Yassine El-Mernissi	19; 21	21; 17	20; 22

==== Mauritius vs Morocco ====
Mauritius
5
Staouéli Hall, Court 1
15 April 2013, 15:00 UTC+1

Morocco
0

			1	2	3
1	(Mauritius) (Morocco)	Aatish Lubah; Bilal El-Harab	21; 15	21; 16
2	(Mauritius) (Morocco)	Aurélie Allet; Oumaina Sahdan	21; 9	21; 1
3	(Mauritius) (Morocco)	Aatish Lubah / Julien Paul; Bilal El-Harab / Yassine El-Mernissi	21; 11	21; 13
4	(Mauritius) (Morocco)	Rheea Dookhee / Shaama Sandooyea; Nour Azzaoui / Oumaina Sahdan	11; 6	23; 7
5	(Mauritius) (Morocco)	Julien Paul / Aurélie Allet; Ahmed Amine Ksikes / Nour Azzaoui	21; 6	21; 5

==== Algeria vs Ghana ====
Algeria
5
Staouéli Hall, Court 2
15 April 2013, 15:00 UTC+1

Ghana
0

			1	2	3
1	(Algeria) (Ghana)	Youcef Sabri Medel; Mohammed Adam				w/o
2	(Algeria) (Ghana)	Nassima Loukal; Diana Archer				w/o
3	(Algeria) (Ghana)	Youcef Sabri Medel / Sid Ali Bouksani; Lawton Arhin Hamilton / Emmanuel Botwe				w/o
4	(Algeria) (Ghana)	Nesrine Baya / Yasmine Aissani; Stella Amasah / Diana Archer				w/o
5	(Algeria) (Ghana)	Nesrine Baya / Sid Ali Bouksani; Mohammed Adam / Diana Archer				w/o

==== Mauritius vs Algeria ====
Mauritius
2
Staouéli Hall, Court 4
16 April 2013, 09:00 UTC+1

Algeria
3

			1	2	3
1	(Mauritius) (Algeria)	Aatish Lubah; Youcef Sabri Medel	21; 19	21; 14
2	(Mauritius) (Algeria)	Shaama Sandooyea; Nesrine Baya	10; 21	11; 21
3	(Mauritius) (Algeria)	Aatish Lubah / Julien Paul; Sid Ali Bouksani / Amine Guelmaoui	22; 20	21; 11
4	(Mauritius) (Algeria)	Rheea Dookhee / Shaama Sandooyea; Yasmine Aissani / Nassima Loukal	15; 21	13; 21
5	(Mauritius) (Algeria)	Julien Paul / Aurélie Allet; Youcef Sabri Medel / Nesrine Baya	9; 21	18; 21

==== Ghana vs Morocco ====
Ghana
5
Staouéli Hall, Court 3
16 April 2013, 09:00 UTC+1

Morocco
0

			1	2	3
1	(Ghana) (Morocco)	Mohammed Adam; Yassine El-Mernissi	21; 17	15; 21	21; 16
2	(Ghana) (Morocco)	Stella Amasah; Nour Azzaoui	21; 2	21; 5
3	(Ghana) (Morocco)	Mohammed Adam / Emmanuel Botwe; Bilal El-Harab / Yassine El-Mernissi	21; 17	15; 21	21; 17
4	(Ghana) (Morocco)	Stella Amasah / Diana Archer; Nour Azzaoui / Oumaina Sahdan	21; 4	21; 9
5	(Ghana) (Morocco)	Lawton Arhin Hamilton / Diana Archer; Ahmed Amine Ksikes / Oumaina Sahdan	21; 5	21; 10

=== Group B ===
Pos	Team	Pld	W	L	MF	MA	MD	GF	GA	GD	PF	PA	PD	Pts	Qualification
1	Nigeria	4	4	0	16	4	+12	33	11	+22	876	606	+270	4	Advance to Knockout stage
2	South Africa	4	3	1	16	4	+12	35	10	+25	889	599	+290	3	Advance to Knockout stage
3	Egypt	4	2	2	12	8	+4	26	16	+10	735	633	+102	2	
4	Botswana	4	1	3	6	14	−8	12	29	−17	585	758	−173	1	
5	Seychelles	4	0	4	0	20	−20	0	40	−40	351	840	−489	0	

Source: tournamentsoftware.com

==== Egypt vs Botswana ====
Egypt
5
Staouéli Hall, Court 1
15 April 2013, 10:00 UTC+1

Botswana
0

			1	2	3
1	(Egypt) (Botswana)	Abdelrahman Abdelhakim; Tumisang Olekantse	21; 11	21; 7
2	(Egypt) (Botswana)	Doha Hany; Dintle Malepa	21; 12	21; 8
3	(Egypt) (Botswana)	Abdelrahman Abdelhakim / Zaher Hassan Abdelrahman; Tefo Kabomo / Tumisang Olekantse	21; 13	21; 16
4	(Egypt) (Botswana)	Doha Hany / Nayera Amgad Helali; Tessa Kabelo / Dintle Malepa	21; 9	21; 12
5	(Egypt) (Botswana)	Youssef Abdel Fatah / Toka Elwasary; Tefo Kabomo / Tessa Kabelo	21; 19	21; 18

==== Nigeria vs Seychelles ====
Nigeria
5
Staouéli Hall, Court 3
15 April 2013, 10:00 UTC+1

Seychelles
0

			1	2	3
1	(Nigeria) (Seychelles)	Olamid Adebayo / Usman Isiaq; Christian Toussant / Aaron Vidot
2	(Nigeria) (Seychelles)	Mustapha Muhammed; Javis Renaud	21; 8	21; 6
3	(Nigeria) (Seychelles)	Zainab Momoh; Chlorie Cadeau	21; 6	21; 12
4	(Nigeria) (Seychelles)	Dorcas Ajoke Adesokan / Augustina Ebhomien Sunday; Chlorie Cadeau / Sheryl Lucas	21; 7	21; 8
5	(Nigeria) (Seychelles)	Jafar Umar / Dorcas Ajoke Adesokan; Javis Renaud / Stephany Henriette	19; 8	21; 12

==== South Africa vs Nigeria ====
South Africa
1
Staouéli Hall, Court 2
15 April 2013, 15:00 UTC+1

Nigeria
4

			1	2	3
1	(South Africa) (Nigeria)	Cameron Coetzer; Habeeb Bello	19; 21	21; 18	9; 21
2	(South Africa) (Nigeria)	Demi Botha; Dorcas Ajoke Adesokan	21; 15	8; 21	12; 21
3	(South Africa) (Nigeria)	Cameron Coetzer / Reneshan Naidoo; Habeeb Bello / Jafar Umar	18; 21	15; 21
4	(South Africa) (Nigeria)	Demi Botha / Janke van der Vyver; Zainab Momoh / Augustina Ebhomien Sunday	17; 21	22; 20	21; 23
5	(South Africa) (Nigeria)	Reneshan Naidoo / Lee-Ann de Wet; Jafar Umar / Dorcas Ajoke Adesokan	21; 15	21; 15

==== Egypt vs Seychelles ====
Egypt
5
Staouéli Hall, Court 2
15 April 2013, 15:00 UTC+1

Seychelles
0

			1	2	3
1	(Egypt) (Seychelles)	Abdelrahman Abdelhakim; Aaron Vidot	21; 6	21; 3
2	(Egypt) (Seychelles)	Doha Hany; Chlorie Cadeau	21; 3	21; 3
3	(Egypt) (Seychelles)	Abdelrahman Abdelhakim / Zaher Hassan Abdelrahman; Fabian Gerry / Javis Renaud	21; 10	21; 12
4	(Egypt) (Seychelles)	Doha Hany / Nayera Amgad Helali; Stephany Henriette / Sheryl Lucas	21; 13	21; 10
5	(Egypt) (Seychelles)	Youssef Abdel Fatah / Toka Elwasary; Javis Renaud / Chlorie Cadeau	21; 8	21; 8

==== South Africa vs Seychelles ====
South Africa
5
Staouéli Hall, Court 1
15 April 2013, 19:00 UTC+1

Seychelles
0

			1	2	3
1	(South Africa) (Seychelles)	Demi Botha; Sheryl Lucas	21; 6	21; 3
2	(South Africa) (Seychelles)	Cameron Coetzer; Javis Renaud	21; 4	21; 8
3	(South Africa) (Seychelles)	Reneshan Naidoo / Lee-Ann de Wet; Chlorie Cadeau / Aaron Vidot	21; 7	21; 10
4	(South Africa) (Seychelles)	Demi Botha / Janke van der Vyver; Stephany Henriette / Sheryl Lucas	21; 7	21; 10
5	(South Africa) (Seychelles)	Cameron Coetzer / Reneshan Naidoo; Javis Renaud / Christian Toussant	21; 7	21; 8

==== Nigeria vs Botswana ====
Nigeria
4
Staouéli Hall, Court 2
15 April 2013, 19:00 UTC+1

Botswana
1

			1	2	3
1	(Nigeria) (Botswana)	Usman Isiaq; Tumisang Olekantse	21; 17	18; 21	18; 21
2	(Nigeria) (Botswana)	Augustina Ebhomien Sunday; Tessa Kabelo	21; 7	21; 9
3	(Nigeria) (Botswana)	Usman Isiaq / Olamid Adebayo; Boago Rano / Tefo Kabomo	21; 12	21; 15
4	(Nigeria) (Botswana)	Zainab Momoh / Augustina Ebhomien Sunday; Tessa Kabelo / Keorapetse Moatshe	21; 6	21; 14
5	(Nigeria) (Botswana)	Habeeb Bello / Zainab Momoh; Boago Rano / Keorapetse Moatshe	21; 13	21; 10

==== Egypt vs Nigeria ====
Egypt
2
Staouéli Hall, Court 1
16 April 2013, 09:00 UTC+1

Nigeria
3

			1	2	3
1	(Egypt) (Nigeria)	Youssef Abdel Fatah / Toka Elwasary; Dorcas Ajoke Adesokan / Habeeb Bello	9; 21	10; 21
2	(Egypt) (Nigeria)	Ahmed Hegab; Mustapha Muhammed	16; 21	11; 21
3	(Egypt) (Nigeria)	Doha Hany; Zainab Momoh	23; 21	21; 7
4	(Egypt) (Nigeria)	Abdelrahman Abdelhakim / Zaher Hassan Abdelrahman; Habeeb Bello / Jafar Umar	21; 18	21; 16
5	(Egypt) (Nigeria)	Doha Hany / Naja Mohamed; Dorcas Ajoke Adesokan / Zainab Momoh	4; 21	8; 21

==== South Africa vs Botswana ====
South Africa
5
Staouéli Hall, Court 2
16 April 2013, 09:00 UTC+1

Botswana
0

			1	2	3
1	(South Africa) (Botswana)	Janke van der Vyver; Tessa Kabelo	21; 10	21; 6
2	(South Africa) (Botswana)	Cameron Coetzer; Tefo Kabomo	21; 9	21; 15
3	(South Africa) (Botswana)	Lee-Ann de Wet / Anri Schoonees; Tessa Kabelo / Keorapetse Moatshe	21; 11	21; 7
4	(South Africa) (Botswana)	Cameron Coetzer / Reneshan Naidoo; Boago Rano / Tefo Kabomo	21; 15	21; 13
5	(South Africa) (Botswana)	Reneshan Naidoo / Demi Botha; Boago Rano / Keorapetse Moatshe	21; 9	21; 10

==== South Africa vs Egypt ====
Egypt
5
Staouéli Hall, Court 1
16 April 2013, 14:00 UTC+1

Nigeria
0

			1	2	3
1	(Egypt) (Nigeria)	Cameron Coetzer; Abdelrahman Abdelhakim	21; 14	17; 21	21; 12
2	(Egypt) (Nigeria)	Janke van der Vyver; Nayera Amgad Helali	21; 14	21; 4
3	(Egypt) (Nigeria)	Cameron Coetzer / Reneshan Naidoo; Zaher Hassan Abdelrahman / Youssef Abdel Fatah	21; 11	21; 13
4	(Egypt) (Nigeria)	Lee-Ann de Wet / Janke van der Vyver; Toka Elwasary / Nayera Amgad Helali	21; 11	21; 15
5	(Egypt) (Nigeria)	Reneshan Naidoo / Lee-Ann de Wet; Youssef Abdel Fatah / Toka Elwasary	22; 20	16; 21	21; 15

==== Botswana vs Seychelles ====
Botswana
5
Staouéli Hall, Court 2
16 April 2013, 14:00 UTC+1

Seychelles
0

			1	2	3
1	(Botswana) (Seychelles)	Tessa Kabelo; Stephany Henriette	21; 8	21; 18
2	(Botswana) (Seychelles)	Tumisang Olekantse; Fabian Gerry	21; 3	21; 5
3	(Botswana) (Seychelles)	Tumisang Olekantse / Dintle Malepa; Christian Toussant / Chlorie Cadeau	21; 10	21; 9
4	(Botswana) (Seychelles)	Tessa Kabelo / Dintle Malepa; Chlorie Cadeau / Sheryl Lucas	21; 19	21; 14
5	(Botswana) (Seychelles)	Boago Rano / Tefo Kabomo; Javis Renaud / Christian Toussant	21; 11	21; 16

=== Knockout stage ===
Semi-finals
Algeria	0
South Africa	3
Mauritius	2
Nigeria	3

Final
South Africa	3
Nigeria	2

==== Semi-finals ====
South Africa
3
Staouéli Hall, Court 1
17 April 2013, 10:00 UTC+1

Algeria
0

			1	2	3
1	(South Africa) (Algeria)	Reneshan Naidoo / Lee-Ann de Wet; Youcef Sabri Medel / Nesrine Baya	21; 15	21; 14
2	(South Africa) (Algeria)	Cameron Coetzer; Youcef Sabri Medel	19; 21	21; 19	21; 9
3	(South Africa) (Algeria)	Janke van der Vyver; Nesrine Baya	21; 19	21; 9
4	(South Africa) (Algeria)	Cameron Coetzer / Reneshan Naidoo; Sid Ali Bouksani / Amine Guelmaoui				not played
5	(South Africa) (Algeria)	Lee-Ann de Wet / Janke van der Vyver; Yasmine Aissani / Nassima Loukal				not played

Mauritius
2
Staouéli Hall, Court 4
17 April 2013, 10:00 UTC+1

Nigeria
3

			1	2	3
1	(Mauritius) (Nigeria)	Aatish Lubah; Habeeb Bello	21; 16	20; 22	21; 17
2	(Mauritius) (Nigeria)	Shaama Sandooyea; Dorcas Ajoke Adesokan	12; 21	15; 21
3	(Mauritius) (Nigeria)	Aatish Lubah / Julien Paul; Usman Isiaq / Olamid Adebayo	21; 18	21; 14
4	(Mauritius) (Nigeria)	Rheea Dookhee / Shaama Sandooyea; Augustina Ebhomien Sunday / Zainab Momoh	17; 21	18; 21
5	(Mauritius) (Nigeria)	Julien Paul / Aurélie Allet; Habeeb Bello / Dorcas Ajoke Adesokan	14; 21	18; 21

==== Final ====
South Africa
3
Staouéli Hall, Court 1
17 April 2013, 17:00 UTC+1

Nigeria
2

			1	2	3
1	(South Africa) (Nigeria)	Reneshan Naidoo / Lee-Ann de Wet; Dorcas Ajoke Adesokan / Habeeb Bello	18; 21	20; 22
2	(South Africa) (Nigeria)	Cameron Coetzer; Mustapha Muhammed	21; 12	15; 21	21; 7
3	(South Africa) (Nigeria)	Janke van der Vyver; Augustina Ebhomien Sunday	18; 21	19; 21
4	(South Africa) (Nigeria)	Cameron Coetzer / Reneshan Naidoo; Habeeb Bello / Usman Isiaq	21; 12	14; 21	21; 15
5	(South Africa) (Nigeria)	Lee-Ann de Wet / Janke van der Vyver; Dorcas Ajoke Adesokan / Zainab Momoh	21; 18	21; 15

=== Final ranking ===
Pos	Team	Pld	W	L	Pts	MD	GD	PD	Final result
1st place, gold medalist(s)	South Africa	6	5	1	5	+16	+30	+353	Champions
2nd place, silver medalist(s)	Nigeria	6	5	1	5	+12	+25	+261	Runners-up
3rd place, bronze medalist(s)	Mauritius	4	3	1	3	+4	+6	+107	Eliminated in semi-finals
3rd place, bronze medalist(s)	Algeria	4	3	1	3	+1	+1	+56	Eliminated in semi-finals
5	Egypt	3	2	2	2	+6	+10	+122	Eliminated in group stage
6	Ghana	3	1	2	1	−1	+7	+66	Eliminated in group stage
7	Botswana	4	1	3	1	−8	−17	−173	Eliminated in group stage
8	Morocco	3	0	3	0	−13	−22	−283	Eliminated in group stage
9	Seychelles	4	0	4	0	−20	−40	−489	Eliminated in group stage

== Individual event ==
=== Boys' singles ===
Semifinals
(South Africa) Reneshan Naidoo	18	11
(Nigeria) Habeeb Bello	21	21
(Algeria) Youcef Sabri Medel	21	14	17
(Mauritius) Aatish Lubah	19	21	21

Final
(Nigeria) Habeeb Bello	15	22	21
(Mauritius) Aatish Lubah	21	20	16

=== Girls' singles ===
Semifinals
(South Africa) Lee-Ann de Wet	17	21	21
(South Africa) Demi Botha	21	16	10
(Egypt) Naja Mohamed	10	19
(Nigeria) Dorcas Ajoke Adesokan	21	21

Final
(South Africa) Lee-Ann de Wet	21	11	16
(Nigeria) Dorcas Ajoke Adesokan	18	21	21

=== Boys' doubles ===
Semifinals
(Egypt) Abdelrahman Abdelhakim (Egypt) Youssef Abdel Fatah	16	21	21
(Algeria) Sid Ali Bouksani (Algeria) Youcef Sabri Medel	21	17	17
(Nigeria) Habeeb Bello (Nigeria) Mustapha Muhammed	17	17
(Mauritius) Aatish Lubah (Mauritius) Julien Paul	21	21

Final
(Egypt) Abdelrahman Abdelhakim (Egypt) Youssef Abdel Fatah	13	11
(Mauritius) Aatish Lubah (Mauritius) Julien Paul	21	21

=== Girls' doubles ===
Semifinals
(Egypt) Doha Hany (Egypt) Toka Elwasary	14	17
(South Africa) Lee-Ann de Wet (South Africa) Anri Schoonees	21	21
(Nigeria) Dorcas Ajoke Adesokan (Nigeria) Augustina Ebhomien Sunday	21	21
(Mauritius) Aurélie Allet (Mauritius) Shaama Sandooyea	19	19

Final
(South Africa) Lee-Ann de Wet (South Africa) Anri Schoonees	13	21	21
(Nigeria) Dorcas Ajoke Adesokan (Nigeria) Augustina Ebhomien Sunday	21	17	15

=== Mixed doubles ===
Semifinals
(Nigeria) Habeeb Bello (Nigeria) Dorcas Ajoke Adesokan	21	21
(South Africa) Bongani von Bodenstein (South Africa) Demi Botha	17	14
(Egypt) Youssef Abdel Fatah (Egypt) Toka Elwasary	23	21	19
(Mauritius) Julien Paul (Mauritius) Aurélie Allet	21	23	21

Final
(Nigeria) Habeeb Bello (Nigeria) Dorcas Ajoke Adesokan	21	17	17
(Mauritius) Julien Paul (Mauritius) Aurélie Allet	13	21	21
