= DR Congo national badminton team =

National badminton team representing the Democratic Republic of the Congo

DR Congo
- Nickname(s): The Leopards
- Association: Federation de Badminton du Congo (FEBADCO)
- Confederation: BCA (Africa)
- President: Medard Loboto Bongoy

BWF ranking
- Current ranking: Unranked (2 April 2024)
- Highest ranking: 97 (6 April 2017)

African Mixed Team Championships
- Appearances: 1 (first in 2019)
- Best result: Group stage

The DR Congo national badminton team (French: Equipe nationale de badminton de la RD Congo; Lingala: Timu ya badminton ya Republíki ya Kongó Demokratíki) represents DR Congo in international team competitions. The national team is controlled by the DR Congo Badminton Federation (FEBADCO; Federation de Badminton du Congo). The team are nicknamed Les Léopards.

The Democratic Republic of the Congo first competed in the 2011 All-Africa Games mixed team event in 2011. The team made their first appearance at the African Badminton Championships in 2019. The Democratic Republic of the Congo junior team have also competed in the 2018 African Youth Games in the boys' team and the girls' team events.

== History ==
=== Mixed team ===
The Democratic Republic of the Congo competed in the 2011 All-Africa Games and were drawn into Group 1 with Egypt and Mauritius. The team lost 5–0 to Mauritius and received a walkover from Egypt after the Egyptian team decided to withdraw from the competition. In the 2015 African Games, the team were drawn into Group 4 with Seychelles, Ethiopia and Algeria. The team lost 5–0 to all of their opponents.

In 2017, the Democratic Republic of the Congo originally planned to compete in the Summer Universiade mixed team event in Taipei but they later withdrew. In 2019, the team competed in the African Badminton Championships. The team lost 5–0 to Uganda and Egypt in the group stage. Months later, the team made their third appearance at the African Games. The team lost 5–0 to Algeria and Uganda.

In 2024, the DR Congo Badminton Federation planned to send the team which had 12 players from the national squad to compete in the 2023 African Games team event and the individual events. However, the team had to withdraw from both team and individual events due to the team event being cancelled on short notice.

== Competitive record ==
=== Thomas Cup ===
Year	Round	Pos
1949 to 1958	Part of Belgium	
1961 to 2024	Did not enter	
2026	To be determined	
2028	To be determined	
2030	To be determined	

=== Uber Cup ===
Year	Round	Pos
1957	Part of Belgium	
1960	Part of Belgium	
1963 to 2024	Did not enter	
2026	To be determined	
2028	To be determined	
2030	To be determined	

=== Sudirman Cup ===
Year	Round	Pos
1989 to 2023	Did not enter	
2025	To be determined	
2027	To be determined	
2029	To be determined	

=== African Games ===
==== Mixed team ====
Year	Round	Pos
2003	Did not enter	
2007	Did not enter	
2011	Group stage	
2015	Group stage	
2019	Group stage	
2027	To be determined	

=== African Team Championships ===
==== Men's team ====
Year	Round	Pos
1979 to 2024	Did not enter	
2026	To be determined	
2028	To be determined	
2030	To be determined	

==== Women's team ====
Year	Round	Pos
1979 to 2024	Did not enter	
2026	To be determined	
2028	To be determined	
2030	To be determined	

==== Mixed team ====
Year	Round	Pos
1980 to 2017	Did not enter	
2019	Group stage	
2021	Did not enter	
2023	Did not enter	
2025	To be determined	
2027	To be determined	
2029	To be determined	

=== FISU World University Games ===
==== Mixed team ====
Year	Round	Pos
2007	Did not enter	
2011	Did not enter	
2013	Did not enter	
2015	Did not enter	
2017	Withdrew	
2021	Did not enter	
2025	TBD	

=== World University Team Championships ===
==== Mixed team ====
Year	Round	Pos
2008	Did not enter	
2010	Did not enter	
2012	Did not enter	
2014	Did not enter	
2016	Did not enter	
2018	Did not enter	

**Red border color indicates tournament was held on home soil.

== Junior competitive record ==
=== Suhandinata Cup ===
Year	Round	Pos
2000 to 2024	Did not enter	
2025	To be determined	

=== African Youth Games ===
==== Men's team ====
Year	Round	Pos
2018	Group stage	8th

==== Women's team ====
Year	Round	Pos
2018	Group stage	6th

==== Mixed team ====
Year	Round	Pos
2014	Did not enter	

=== African Junior Team Championships ===
==== Mixed team ====
Year	Round	Pos
1979 to 2022	Did not enter	
2024	To be determined	

**Red border color indicates tournament was held on home soil.

== Players ==
=== Current squad ===
As of 2 January 2024

==== Men's team ====
Name	DoB/Age	Ranking of event		
Name	DoB/Age	MS	MD	XD
Mutombo Tshizanga	26 June 1996 (age 28)	-	-	-
Dimandja Okito	5 July 1998 (age 26)	-	-	-
Zola Wayi	10 October 1999 (age 25)	-	-	-

==== Women's team ====
Name	DoB/Age	Ranking of event		
Name	DoB/Age	WS	WD	XD
Mbuyi Bernice Bokotsha	19 November 1995 (age 29)	-	-	-
Bukasa Kaboko	3 March 2000 (age 25)	-	-	-
Katembua Odia	30 January 1998 (age 27)	-	-	-
