= Badminton at the 2019 African Games – Mixed team =

Badminton – Mixed team at the 2019 African Games
- Venue: Ain Chock Indoor Sports Center
- Dates: 22 – 25 August 2019

Medalists
| gold medal | Nigeria |
| silver medal | Algeria |
| bronze medal | South Africa |
| bronze medal | Egypt |

The mixed team badminton event at the 2019 African Games was held from 22 to 25 August at the Ain Chock Indoor Sports Center in Casablanca.

== Schedule ==
All times based on Central European Time (UTC+01:00)

| Date | Time | Event |
|---|---|---|
| Thursday, 22 August 2019 | 09:00 | Group stage |
| Thursday, 22 August 2019 | 16:00 | Group stage |
| Friday, 23 August 2019 | 09:00 | Group stage |
| Friday, 23 August 2019 | 16:00 | Group stage |
| Saturday, 24 August 2019 | 09:00 | Group stage |
| Saturday, 24 August 2019 | 16:00 | Quarter-finals |
| Sunday, 25 August 2019 | 09:00 | Semi-finals |
| Sunday, 25 August 2019 | 16:00 | Gold medal match |

== Competition format ==
Thirteen teams were drawn into groups of four. The top two teams in each group advance to the knockout stage. Each tie consists of five matches, one for each discipline (men's / women's singles, men's / women's / mixed doubles).

== Group stage ==
=== Group A ===
| Pos | Team | Pld | W | L | MF | MA | MD | GF | GA | GD | PF | PA | PD | Pts | Qualification |
|---|---|---|---|---|---|---|---|---|---|---|---|---|---|---|---|
| 1 | Algeria | 2 | 2 | 0 | 10 | 0 | +10 | 20 | 2 | +18 | 460 | 257 | +203 | 2 | Knockout stage |
| 2 | Uganda | 2 | 1 | 1 | 0 | 5 | −5 | 12 | 10 | +2 | 405 | 339 | +66 | 1 | Knockout stage |
| 3 | DR Congo | 2 | 0 | 2 | 0 | 10 | −10 | 0 | 20 | −20 | 151 | 420 | −269 | 0 | |

Source: TS

Uganda
5
Ain Chock Indoor Sports Center, Court 3
22 August 2019, 09:00 UTC+1

DR Congo
0

| | | | 1 | 2 | 3 |
|---|---|---|---|---|---|
| 1 | (Uganda) (Democratic Republic of the Congo) | Brian Kasirye; Mutombo Tshizanga | 21; 11 | 21; 9 |
| 2 | (Uganda) (Democratic Republic of the Congo) | Aisha Nakiyemba; Katambua Odia | 21; 12 | 21; 14 |
| 3 | (Uganda) (Democratic Republic of the Congo) | Brian Kasirye / Daniel Mihigo; Dimandja Okito / Mutombo Tshizanga | 21; 10 | 21; 13 |
| 4 | (Uganda) (Democratic Republic of the Congo) | Gladys Mbabazi / Aisha Nakiyemba; Bernice Mbuyi Bokotsha / Katambua Odia | 21; 5 | 21; 3 |
| 5 | (Uganda) (Democratic Republic of the Congo) | Daniel Mihigo / Mable Namakoye; Bukasa Kaboko / Zola Wayi | 21; 7 | 21; 5 |

Algeria
5
Ain Chock Indoor Sports Center, Court 2
23 August 2019, 09:00 UTC+1

DR Congo
0

| | | | 1 | 2 | 3 |
|---|---|---|---|---|---|
| 1 | (Algeria) (Democratic Republic of the Congo) | Malak Ouchefoun; Katambua Odia | 21; 3 | 21; 4 |
| 2 | (Algeria) (Democratic Republic of the Congo) | Mohamed Abderrahime Belarbi; Mutombo Tshizanga | 21; 9 | 21; 11 |
| 3 | (Algeria) (Democratic Republic of the Congo) | Halla Bouksani / Linda Mazri; Bernice Mbuyi Bokotsha / Bukasa Kaboko | 21; 5 | 21; 3 |
| 4 | (Algeria) (Democratic Republic of the Congo) | Koceila Mammeri / Youcef Sabri Medel; Dimandja Okito / Zola Wayi | 21; 4 | 21; 9 |
| 5 | (Algeria) (Democratic Republic of the Congo) | Sifeddine Larbaoui / Linda Mazri; Mutombo Tshizanga / Katambua Odia | 21; 6 | 21; 8 |

Algeria
5
Ain Chock Indoor Sports Center, Court 2
24 August 2019, 09:00 UTC+1

Uganda
0

| | | | 1 | 2 | 3 |
|---|---|---|---|---|---|
| 1 | (Algeria) (Uganda) | Koceila Mammeri / Linda Mazri; Daniel Mihigo / Mable Namakoye | 21; 7 | 21; 10 |
| 2 | (Algeria) (Uganda) | Mohamed Abderrahime Belarbi; Brian Kasirye | 20; 22 | 17; 21 | 23; 21 |
| 3 | (Algeria) (Uganda) | Halla Bouksani; Aisha Nakiyemba | 21; 19 | 18; 21 | 21; 16 |
| 4 | (Algeria) (Uganda) | Koceila Mammeri / Youcef Sabri Medel; Brian Kasirye / Daniel Mihigo | 21; 14 | 21; 14 |
| 5 | (Algeria) (Uganda) | Halla Bouksani / Linda Mazri; Gladys Mbabazi / Aisha Nakiyemba | 21; 15 | 21; 19 |

=== Group B ===
| Pos | Team | Pld | W | L | MF | MA | MD | GF | GA | GD | PF | PA | PD | Pts | Qualification |
|---|---|---|---|---|---|---|---|---|---|---|---|---|---|---|---|
| 1 | Mauritius | 2 | 2 | 0 | 10 | 0 | +10 | 20 | 2 | +18 | 461 | 274 | +187 | 2 | Knockout stage |
| 2 | Kenya | 2 | 1 | 1 | 3 | 7 | −4 | 8 | 15 | −7 | 358 | 434 | −76 | 1 | Knockout stage |
| 3 | Morocco (H) | 2 | 0 | 2 | 2 | 8 | −6 | 6 | 17 | −11 | 316 | 427 | −111 | 0 | |

Source: TS
(H) Host

Mauritius
5
Ain Chock Indoor Sports Center, Court 1
22 August 2019, 09:00 UTC+1

Morocco
0

| | | | 1 | 2 | 3 |
|---|---|---|---|---|---|
| 1 | (Mauritius) (Morocco) | Aatish Lubah; Bilal El Harab | 21; 13 | 16; 21 | 21; 7 |
| 2 | (Mauritius) (Morocco) | Aurélie Allet; Ghita Charouite | 21; 6 | 21; 7 |
| 3 | (Mauritius) (Morocco) | Melvin Appiah / Aatish Lubah; Bilal El Harab / Anas Idlahoucine | 21; 11 | 21; 15 |
| 4 | (Mauritius) (Morocco) | Aurélie Allet / Kobita Dookhee; Meryem Bengelloun / Jinane Bitarie | 21; 6 | 21; 5 |
| 5 | (Mauritius) (Morocco) | Melvin Appiah / Kobita Dookhee; Ghita Charouite / Anas Idlahoucine | 21; 9 | 21; 17 |

Kenya
3
Ain Chock Indoor Sports Center, Court 1
2 September 2015, 18:00 UTC+1

Morocco
2

| | | | 1 | 2 | 3 |
|---|---|---|---|---|---|
| 1 | (Kenya) (Morocco) | John Wanyoike; Bilal El Harab | 8; 21 | 10; 21 |
| 2 | (Kenya) (Morocco) | Lavina Martins; Ghita Charouite | 21; 12 | 13; 21 | 21; 18 |
| 3 | (Kenya) (Morocco) | Edwin Akwanyi / Nixon Kiprotich; Bilal El Harab / Anas Idlahoucine | 22; 20 | 11; 21 | 11; 21 |
| 4 | (Kenya) (Morocco) | Mercy Joseph / Lavina Martins; Meryem Bengelloun / Jinane Bitarie | 21; 8 | 21; 11 |
| 5 | (Kenya) (Morocco) | John Wanyoike / Mercy Joseph; Ghita Charouite / Anas Idlahoucine | 21; 12 | 21; 13 |

Mauritius
5
Ain Chock Indoor Sports Center, Court 4
3 September 2015, 10:00 UTC+1

Kenya
0

| | | | 1 | 2 | 3 |
|---|---|---|---|---|---|
| 1 | (Mauritius) (Kenya) | Aatish Lubah / Aurélie Allet; Ghita Charouite / Anas Idlahoucine | 21; 13 | 21; 16 |
| 2 | (Mauritius) (Kenya) | Melvin Appiah; Edwin Njeri | 21; 12 | 21; 12 |
| 3 | (Mauritius) (Kenya) | Lorna Bodha; Lavina Martins | 21; 15 | 21; 15 |
| 4 | (Mauritius) (Kenya) | Melvin Appiah / Aatish Lubah; Edwin Akwanyi / John Wanyoike | 23; 21 | 21; 12 |
| 5 | (Mauritius) (Kenya) | Aurélie Allet / Kobita Dookhee; Mercy Joseph / Lavina Martins | 21; 9 | 23; 25 | 21; 7 |

=== Group C ===
| Pos | Team | Pld | W | L | MF | MA | MD | GF | GA | GD | PF | PA | PD | Pts | Qualification |
|---|---|---|---|---|---|---|---|---|---|---|---|---|---|---|---|
| 1 | South Africa | 2 | 2 | 0 | 8 | 2 | +6 | 18 | 5 | +13 | 464 | 303 | +161 | 2 | Knockout stage |
| 2 | Egypt | 2 | 1 | 1 | 7 | 3 | +4 | 15 | 8 | +7 | 441 | 339 | +102 | 1 | Knockout stage |
| 3 | Eritrea | 2 | 0 | 2 | 0 | 10 | −10 | 0 | 20 | −20 | 157 | 420 | −263 | 0 | |

Source: TS

Egypt
5
Ain Chock Indoor Sports Center, Court 2
22 August 2019, 09:00 UTC+1

Eritrea
0

| | | | 1 | 2 | 3 |
|---|---|---|---|---|---|
| 1 | (Egypt) (Eritrea) | Ahmed Salah; Leykun Semere | 21; 4 | 21; 3 |
| 2 | (Egypt) (Eritrea) | Hadia Hosny; Kisanet Heyelom | 21; 6 | 21; 10 |
| 3 | (Egypt) (Eritrea) | Abdelrahman Abdelhakim / Mohamed Mostafa Kamel; Filimon Samsom / Leykun Semere | 21; 8 | 21; 8 |
| 4 | (Egypt) (Eritrea) | Nour Ahmed Youssri / Jana Ashraf; Kisanet Heyelom / Yodit Okbamichael | 21; 4 | 21; 16 |
| 5 | (Egypt) (Eritrea) | Adham Hatem Elgamal / Doha Hany; Filimon Samsom / Yodit Okbamichael | 21; 5 | 21; 8 |

South Africa
5
Ain Chock Indoor Sports Center, Court 3
2 September 2015, 18:00 UTC+1

Eritrea
0

| | | | 1 | 2 | 3 |
|---|---|---|---|---|---|
| 1 | (South Africa) (Eritrea) | Jarred Elliott / Megan de Beer; Leykun Semere / Yodit Okbamichael | 21; 3 | 21; 7 |
| 2 | (South Africa) (Eritrea) | Ruan Snyman; Filimon Samsom | 21; 6 | 21; 11 |
| 3 | (South Africa) (Eritrea) | Johanita Scholtz; Kisanet Heyelom | 21; 13 | 21; 7 |
| 4 | (South Africa) (Eritrea) | Jason Mann / Bongani von Bodenstein; Filimon Samsom / Leykun Semere | 21; 10 | 21; 12 |
| 5 | (South Africa) (Eritrea) | Lehandre Schoeman / Johanita Scholtz; Kisanet Heyelom / Yodit Okbamichael | 21; 9 | 21; 7 |

Egypt
3
Ain Chock Indoor Sports Center, Court 1
3 September 2015, 10:00 UTC+1

South Africa
2

| | | | 1 | 2 | 3 |
|---|---|---|---|---|---|
| 1 | (Egypt) (South Africa) | Ahmed Salah / Hadia Hosny; Jarred Elliott / Megan de Beer | 22; 20 | 21; 17 |
| 2 | (Egypt) (South Africa) | Adham Hatem Elgamal; Ruan Snyman | 21; 13 | 18; 21 | 21; 14 |
| 3 | (Egypt) (South Africa) | Doha Hany; Johanita Scholtz | 21; 19 | 24; 26 | 13; 21 |
| 4 | (Egypt) (South Africa) | Adham Hatem Elgamal / Ahmed Salah; Jason Mann / Bongani von Bodenstein | 21; 12 | 21; 9 |
| 5 | (Egypt) (South Africa) | Doha Hany / Hadia Hosny; Megan de Beer / Johanita Scholtz | 15; 21 | 21; 17 | 15; 21 |

=== Group D ===
| Pos | Team | Pld | W | L | MF | MA | MD | GF | GA | GD | PF | PA | PD | Pts | Qualification |
|---|---|---|---|---|---|---|---|---|---|---|---|---|---|---|---|
| 1 | Nigeria | 3 | 3 | 0 | 14 | 1 | +13 | 29 | 3 | +26 | 654 | 357 | +297 | 3 | Knockout stage |
| 2 | Zambia | 3 | 2 | 1 | 11 | 4 | +7 | 23 | 9 | +14 | 608 | 403 | +205 | 2 | Knockout stage |
| 3 | Ethiopia | 3 | 1 | 2 | 5 | 10 | −5 | 10 | 20 | −10 | 454 | 498 | −44 | 1 | |
| 4 | Tunisia | 3 | 0 | 3 | 0 | 15 | −15 | 0 | 30 | −30 | 172 | 630 | −458 | 0 | |

Source: TS

Nigeria
5
Ain Chock Indoor Sports Center, Court 1
22 August 2019, 16:00 UTC+1

Ethiopia
0

| | | | 1 | 2 | 3 |
|---|---|---|---|---|---|
| 1 | (Nigeria) (Ethiopia) | Sofiat Arinola Obanishola; Melat Belete | 21; 13 | 21; 9 |
| 2 | (Nigeria) (Ethiopia) | Habeeb Temitope Bello; Endale Teklu | 21; 9 | 21; 12 |
| 3 | (Nigeria) (Ethiopia) | Amin Yop Christopher / Peace Orji; Melat Belete / Yerusksew Legssey Tura | 21; 11 | 21; 19 |
| 4 | (Nigeria) (Ethiopia) | Godwin Olofua / Anuoluwapo Juwon Opeyori; Kisanet Heyelom / Yodit Okbamichael | 21; 11 | 21; 8 |
| 5 | (Nigeria) (Ethiopia) | Gideon Babalola / Zainab Damilola Alabi; Endale Teklu / Yerusksew Legssey Tura | 24; 22 | 21; 15 |

Zambia
5
Ain Chock Indoor Sports Center, Court 2
22 August 2019, 16:00 UTC+1

Tunisia
0

| | | | 1 | 2 | 3 |
|---|---|---|---|---|---|
| 1 | (Zambia) (Tunisia) | Chongo Mulenga / Evelyn Siamupangila; Sarra Hamroun / Ouzaier Khayati | 21; 3 | 21; 7 |
| 2 | (Zambia) (Tunisia) | Kalombo Mulenga; Mouin Rahali | 21; 7 | 21; 8 |
| 3 | (Zambia) (Tunisia) | Ogar Siamupangila; Wiem Ben Ahmed | 21; 6 | 21; 4 |
| 4 | (Zambia) (Tunisia) | Chongo Mulenga / Kalombo Mulenga; Ouzaier Khayati / Mouin Rahali | 21; 6 | 21; 4 |
| 5 | (Zambia) (Tunisia) | Evelyn Siamupangila / Ogar Siamupangila; Wiem Ben Ahmed / Sarra Hamroun | 21; 8 | 21; 4 |

Nigeria
5
Ain Chock Indoor Sports Center, Court 1
23 August 2019, 16:00 UTC+1

Tunisia
0

| | | | 1 | 2 | 3 |
|---|---|---|---|---|---|
| 1 | (Nigeria) (Tunisia) | Habeeb Temitope Bello / Amin Yop Christopher; Wiem Ben Ahmed / Mouin Rahali | 21; 3 | 21; 3 |
| 2 | (Nigeria) (Tunisia) | Clement Krobakpo; Ouzaier Khayati | 21; 11 | 21; 3 |
| 3 | (Nigeria) (Tunisia) | Uchechukwu Deborah Ukeh; Sarra Hamroun | 21; 6 | 24; 5 |
| 4 | (Nigeria) (Tunisia) | Godwin Olofua / Anuoluwapo Juwon Opeyori; Youssef Haffouz / Elmootez Belleh Rabah | 21; 2 | 21; 2 |
| 5 | (Nigeria) (Tunisia) | Dorcas Ajoke Adesokan / Uchechukwu Deborah Ukeh; Wiem Ben Ahmed / Sarra Hamroun | 21; 1 | 21; 4 |

Zambia
5
Ain Chock Indoor Sports Center, Court 2
23 August 2019, 16:00 UTC+1

Ethiopia
0

| | | | 1 | 2 | 3 |
|---|---|---|---|---|---|
| 1 | (Zambia) (Ethiopia) | Chongo Mulenga / Evelyn Siamupangila; Endale Teklu / Yerusksew Legssey Tura | 21; 10 | 21; 13 |
| 2 | (Zambia) (Ethiopia) | Kalombo Mulenga; Yakob Surafel | 21; 7 | 21; 4 |
| 3 | (Zambia) (Ethiopia) | Ogar Siamupangila; Melat Belete | 21; 15 | 21; 10 |
| 4 | (Zambia) (Ethiopia) | Chongo Mulenga / Kalombo Mulenga; Fantahun Estefanos / Yakob Surafel | 21; 11 | 21; 12 |
| 5 | (Zambia) (Ethiopia) | Evelyn Siamupangila / Ogar Siamupangila; Melat Belete / Yerusksew Legssey Tura | 21; 15 | 21; 18 |

Nigeria
4
Ain Chock Indoor Sports Center, Court 3
24 August 2019, 09:00 UTC+1

Zambia
1

| | | | 1 | 2 | 3 |
|---|---|---|---|---|---|
| 1 | (Nigeria) (Zambia) | Enejoh Abah / Peace Orji; Kalombo Mulenga / Ogar Siamupangila | 19; 21 | 21; 17 | 21; 12 |
| 2 | (Nigeria) (Zambia) | Dorcas Ajoke Adesokan; Evelyn Siamupangila | 21; 7 | 21; 11 |
| 3 | (Nigeria) (Zambia) | Anuoluwapo Juwon Opeyori; Chongo Mulenga | 21; 14 | 21; 14 |
| 4 | (Nigeria) (Zambia) | Dorcas Ajoke Adesokan / Uchechukwu Deborah Ukeh; Evelyn Siamupangila / Ogar Siamupangila | 21; 12 | 21; 16 |
| 5 | (Nigeria) (Zambia) | Godwin Olofua / Anuoluwapo Juwon Opeyori; Chongo Mulenga / Kalombo Mulenga | 24; 22 | 10; 21 | 10; 21 |

Ethiopia
5
Ain Chock Indoor Sports Center, Court 5
24 August 2019, 09:00 UTC+1

Tunisia
0

| | | | 1 | 2 | 3 |
|---|---|---|---|---|---|
| 1 | (Ethiopia) (Tunisia) | Yerusksew Legssey Tura; Wiem Ben Ahmed | 21; 14 | 21; 8 |
| 2 | (Ethiopia) (Tunisia) | Fantahun Estefanos; Mouin Rahali | 21; 17 | 21; 13 |
| 3 | (Ethiopia) (Tunisia) | Melat Belete / Yerusksew Legssey Tura; Fatma Hachani / Sarra Hamroun | 21; 2 | 21; 3 |
| 4 | (Ethiopia) (Tunisia) | Endale Teklu / Fantahun Estefanos; Ouzaier Khayati / Mouin Rahali | 21; 10 | 21; 3 |
| 5 | (Ethiopia) (Tunisia) | Asnake Getachew Sahilu / Melat Belete; Elmootez Belleh Rabah / Wiem Ben Ahmed | 21; 3 | 21; 2 |

== Knockout stage ==
Quarter-finals
Mauritius | 1
South Africa | 3
Algeria | 3
Kenya | 0
Zambia | 0
Egypt | 3
Uganda | 0
Nigeria | 3

Semi-finals
South Africa | 2
Algeria | 3
Egypt | 0
Nigeria | 3

Gold medal match
Algeria | 0
Nigeria | 3

=== Quarter-finals ===
South Africa
3
Ain Chock Indoor Sports Center, Court 1
24 August 2019, 16:00 UTC+1

Mauritius
1

| | | | 1 | 2 | 3 |
|---|---|---|---|---|---|---|
| 1 | (South Africa) (Mauritius) | Jarred Elliott / Megan de Beer; Aatish Lubah / Aurélie Allet | 11; 21 | 17; 21 |
| 2 | (South Africa) (Mauritius) | Johanita Scholtz; Lorna Bodha | 21; 17 | 21; 14 |
| 3 | (South Africa) (Mauritius) | Ruan Snyman; Melvin Appiah | 24; 26 | 21; 12 | 21; 16 |
| 4 | (South Africa) (Mauritius) | Megan de Beer / Johanita Scholtz; Aurélie Allet / Kobita Dookhee | 21; 19 | 21; 17 |
| 5 | (South Africa) (Mauritius) | Jarred Elliott / Sean Noone; Melvin Appiah / Aatish Lubah | | | | not played |

Algeria
3
Ain Chock Indoor Sports Center, Court 5
24 August 2019, 16:00 UTC+1

Kenya
0

| | | | 1 | 2 | 3 |
|---|---|---|---|---|---|---|
| 1 | (Algeria) (Kenya) | Koceila Mammeri / Linda Mazri; Edwin Akwanyi / Lavina Martins | 21; 8 | 21; 9 |
| 2 | (Algeria) (Kenya) | Mohamed Abderrahime Belarbi; John Wanyoike | 21; 7 | 21; 5 |
| 3 | (Algeria) (Kenya) | Halla Bouksani; Mercy Joseph | 21; 9 | 21; 14 |
| 4 | (Algeria) (Kenya) | Koceila Mammeri / Youcef Sabri Medel; Edwin Njeri / John Wanyoike | | | | not played |
| 5 | (Algeria) (Kenya) | Halla Bouksani / Linda Mazri; Mercy Joseph / Lavina Martins | | | | not played |

Egypt
3
Ain Chock Indoor Sports Center, Court 3
24 August 2019, 16:00 UTC+1

Zambia
0

| | | | 1 | 2 | 3 |
|---|---|---|---|---|---|---|
| 1 | (Egypt) (Zambia) | Ahmed Salah / Doha Hany; Chongo Mulenga / Evelyn Siamupangila | 21; 7 | 16; 21 | 21; 12 |
| 2 | (Egypt) (Zambia) | Adham Hatem Elgamal; Kalombo Mulenga | 21; 19 | 21; 11 |
| 3 | (Egypt) (Zambia) | Hadia Hosny; Ogar Siamupangila | 21; 12 | 21; 8 |
| 4 | (Egypt) (Zambia) | Adham Hatem Elgamal / Ahmed Salah; Chongo Mulenga / Kalombo Mulenga | | | | not played |
| 5 | (Egypt) (Zambia) | Doha Hany / Hadia Hosny; Evelyn Siamupangila / Ogar Siamupangila | | | | not played |

Nigeria
3
Ain Chock Indoor Sports Center, Court 2
24 August 2019, 16:00 UTC+1

Uganda
0

| | | | 1 | 2 | 3 |
|---|---|---|---|---|---|---|
| 1 | (Nigeria) (Uganda) | Anuoluwapo Juwon Opeyori; Brian Kasirye | 21; 9 | 21; 17 |
| 2 | (Nigeria) (Uganda) | Dorcas Ajoke Adesokan; Aisha Nakiyemba | 21; 7 | 21; 11 |
| 3 | (Nigeria) (Uganda) | Godwin Olofua / Anuoluwapo Juwon Opeyori; Brian Kasirye / Daniel Mihigo | 21; 14 | 21; 15 |
| 4 | (Nigeria) (Uganda) | Dorcas Ajoke Adesokan / Uchechukwu Deborah Ukeh; Gladys Mbabazi / Aisha Nakiyemba | | | | not played |
| 5 | (Nigeria) (Uganda) | Enejoh Abah / Peace Orji; Daniel Mihigo / Mable Namakoye | | | | not played |

=== Semi-finals ===
South Africa
2
Ain Chock Indoor Sports Center, Court 2
25 August 2019, 09:00 UTC+1

Algeria
3

| | | | 1 | 2 | 3 |
|---|---|---|---|---|---|
| 1 | (South Africa) (Algeria) | Jarred Elliott / Megan de Beer; Koceila Mammeri / Linda Mazri | 10; 21 | 21; 19 | 19; 21 |
| 2 | (South Africa) (Algeria) | Johanita Scholtz; Halla Bouksani | 21; 15 | 21; 10 |
| 3 | (South Africa) (Algeria) | Ruan Snyman; Mohamed Abderrahime Belarbi | 21; 14 | 10; 21 | 10; 21 |
| 4 | (South Africa) (Algeria) | Megan de Beer / Johanita Scholtz; Halla Bouksani / Linda Mazri | 18; 21 | 21; 14 | 21; 9 |
| 5 | (South Africa) (Algeria) | Jarred Elliott / Sean Noone; Koceila Mammeri / Youcef Sabri Medel | 17; 21 | 17; 21 |

Egypt
0
Ain Chock Indoor Sports Center, Court 1
25 August 2019, 09:00 UTC+1

Nigeria
3

| | | | 1 | 2 | 3 |
|---|---|---|---|---|---|---|
| 1 | (Egypt) (Nigeria) | Adham Hatem Elgamal / Doha Hany; Enejoh Abah / Peace Orji | 21; 15 | 15; 21 | 19; 21 |
| 2 | (Egypt) (Nigeria) | Mohamed Mostafa Kamel; Anuoluwapo Juwon Opeyori | 14; 21 | 12; 21 |
| 3 | (Egypt) (Nigeria) | Hadia Hosny; Dorcas Ajoke Adesokan | 10; 21 | 11; 21 |
| 4 | (Egypt) (Nigeria) | Adham Hatem Elgamal / Ahmed Salah; Enejoh Abah / Clement Krobakpo | | | | not played |
| 5 | (Egypt) (Nigeria) | Doha Hany / Hadia Hosny; Dorcas Ajoke Adesokan / Uchechukwu Deborah Ukeh | | | | not played |

=== Gold medal match ===
Nigeria
3
Ain Chock Indoor Sports Center, Court 1
25 August 2019, 16:00 UTC+1

Algeria
0

| | | | 1 | 2 | 3 |
|---|---|---|---|---|---|---|
| 1 | (Nigeria) (Algeria) | Enejoh Abah / Peace Orji; Koceila Mammeri / Linda Mazri | 16; 21 | 21; 18 | 21; 19 |
| 2 | (Nigeria) (Algeria) | Anuoluwapo Juwon Opeyori; Youcef Sabri Medel | 23; 21 | 21; 11 |
| 3 | (Nigeria) (Algeria) | Dorcas Ajoke Adesokan; Halla Bouksani | 21; 13 | 21; 14 |
| 4 | (Nigeria) (Algeria) | Enejoh Abah / Clement Krobakpo; Mohamed Abderrahime Belarbi / Koceila Mammeri | | | | not played |
| 5 | (Nigeria) (Algeria) | Dorcas Ajoke Adesokan / Uchechukwu Deborah Ukeh; Linda Mazri / Malak Ouchefoun | | | | not played |
