= Ivory Coast national badminton team =

National badminton team representing the Ivory Coast

Ivory Coast
- Nickname(s): Les Éléphants
- Association: Fédération Ivoirienne de Badminton (FIBAD)
- Confederation: BCA (Africa)
- President: Zolobe Dro Honore

BWF ranking
- Current ranking: 120 ▼3 (2 April 2024)
- Highest ranking: 76 (2 January 2019)

African Mixed Team Championships
- Appearances: 1 (first in 2019)
- Best result: Group stage

African Men's Team Championships
- Appearances: 1 (first in 2018)
- Best result: Group stage

The Ivory Coast national badminton team (French: Équipe nationale de badminton de Côte d'Ivoire) represents the Ivory Coast in international team competitions. It is controlled by the Ivorian Badminton Federation (FIBAD; Fédération Ivoirienne de Badminton), the governing body for badminton in the Ivory Coast. The team are nicknamed the Elephants.

The team was formed in 2009 but did not participate in international team events until the late 2010s. The Ivorian men's team debuted in the African Men's Team Championships in 2018. The Ivory Coast made their first appearance at the African Badminton Championships in 2019.

The Ivory Coast have also sent its junior team to compete in the African Junior Badminton Championships in 2016. In 2018, the junior team also competed in the first Coupe Francophone de Badminton in Ouagadougou where the team finished in third place after defeating Burkina Faso, Mali and Niger.

== History ==
=== Men's team ===
The Ivory Coast competed in the 2018 African Men's Team Championships. The team were drawn into Group B with hosts Algeria and Zambia. The team were eliminated after losing 5−0 to Algeria and Zambia.

=== Mixed team ===
The Ivory Coast made their debut in the African Mixed Team Championships in 2019. Drawn into Group C with Algeria, Ghana and Togo, the team lost 5−0 to Algeria and Ghana but achieved their first win by defeating Togo3−2 in the group stages.

== Competitive record ==
=== Thomas Cup ===
Year	Round	Pos
1949 to 1958	Part of France	
1961 to 2016	Did not enter	
2018	Did not qualify	
2020	Did not enter	
2022	Did not enter	
2024	Did not enter	
2026	To be determined	
2028	To be determined	
2030	To be determined	

=== Uber Cup ===
Year	Round	Pos
1957	Part of France	
1960	Part of France	
1963 to 2024	Did not enter	
2026	To be determined	
2028	To be determined	
2030	To be determined	

=== Sudirman Cup ===
Year	Round	Pos
1989 to 2023	Did not enter	
2025	To be determined	
2027	To be determined	
2029	To be determined	

=== African Games ===
==== Mixed team ====
Year	Round	Pos
2003	Did not enter	
2007	Did not enter	
2011	Did not enter	
2015	Did not enter	
2019	Did not enter	
2027	To be determined	

=== African Team Championships ===
==== Men's team ====
Year	Round	Pos
1979 to 2016	Did not enter	
2018	Group stage	
2020	Did not enter	
2022	Did not enter	
2024	Did not enter	
2026	To be determined	
2028	To be determined	
2030	To be determined	

==== Women's team ====
Year	Round	Pos
1979 to 2024	Did not enter	
2026	To be determined	
2028	To be determined	
2030	To be determined	

==== Mixed team ====
Year	Round	Pos
1980 to 2017	Did not enter	
2019	Group stage	
2021	Did not enter	
2023	Did not enter	
2025	To be determined	
2027	To be determined	
2029	To be determined	

**Red border color indicates tournament was held on home soil.

== Junior competitive record ==
=== Suhandinata Cup ===
Year	Round	Pos
2000 to 2024	Did not enter	
2025	To be determined	

=== African Youth Games ===
==== Men's team ====
Year	Round	Pos
2018	Group stage	7th

==== Women's team ====
Year	Round	Pos
2018	Did not enter	

==== Mixed team ====
Year	Round	Pos
2014	Did not enter	

=== African Junior Team Championships ===
==== Mixed team ====
Year	Round	Pos
1979 to 2013	Did not enter	
2016	Group stage	
2021	Did not enter	
2022	Did not enter	
2024	To be determined	

**Red border color indicates tournament was held on home soil.

== Players ==
=== Current squad ===
As of 2 January 2024

==== Men's team ====
Name	DoB/Age	Ranking of event		
Name	DoB/Age	MS	MD	XD
Jean-Yves Tokou	30 May 2003 (age 21)	862	941	973
Akpa Agnimel	1 December 2001 (age 23)	1735	941	740
Yann Emerick Ismael Bledou	31 March 2003 (age 21)	1383	1110	1160
Laurent Kpangni	12 June 2007 (age 17)	1134	1110	-

==== Women's team ====
Name	DoB/Age	Ranking of event		
Name	DoB/Age	WS	WD	XD
Esme Loess	23 March 2002 (age 23)	701	871	740
Naffissatou Kamilu	1 January 2000 (age 25)	889	871	1160
Grace Ettien	25 October 2004 (age 20)	889	-	973
Angela Lekpehi	2 February 2007 (age 18)	1085	-	-
