= Aurélie Allet =

Mauritian badminton player

Personal information
- Born: Aurélie Marie Elisa Allet; 1 July 1997 (age 29) Quatre Bornes, Mauritius

Sport
- Country: Mauritius
- Sport: Badminton
- Handedness: Right

Women's singles & doubles
- Highest ranking: 160 (WS 12 February 2019); 110 (WD 1 November 2018); 107 (XD 22 November 2018)
- BWF profile
Medal record
Women's badminton
Representing Mauritius
African Games
Bronze medal – third place	2019 Rabat	Mixed doubles
African Championships
Silver medal – second place	2019 Port Harcourt	Mixed team
Bronze medal – third place	2014 Gaborone	Mixed team
Africa Team Championships
Gold medal – first place	2018 Algiers	Women's team
Bronze medal – third place	2020 Cairo	Women's team
African Youth Games
Gold medal – first place	2014 Gaborone	Mixed doubles
Silver medal – second place	2014 Gaborone	Girls' doubles
Bronze medal – third place	2014 Gaborone	Mixed team
African Junior Championships
Gold medal – first place	2013 Algiers	Mixed doubles
Bronze medal – third place	2011 Maputo	Girls' doubles
Bronze medal – third place	2013 Algiers	Girls' doubles
Bronze medal – third place	2013 Algiers	Mixed team

Aurélie Marie Elisa Allet (born 1 July 1997) is a Mauritian badminton player. She was the mixed doubles gold medalists at the 2013 African Junior Championships and 2014 African Youth Games. She competed at the 2018 Commonwealth Games in Gold Coast, and in June 2018, Allet won her first senior international title at the Mauritius International tournament in the mixed doubles event with Julien Paul. Allet competed at the 2019 African Games, and won a bronze medal in the mixed doubles event.

== Personal life ==
Allet was proposed by her Australian boyfriend Justin Serret after she finished her round one win in Gold Coast 2018.

== Achievements ==
=== African Games ===
Mixed doubles
Year	Venue	Partner	Opponent	Score	Result
2019	Ain Chock Indoor Sports Center; Casablanca, Morocco	(Mauritius) Julien Paul	(Algeria) Koceila Mammeri (Algeria) Linda Mazri	18–21, 22–20, 14–21	Bronze

=== African Youth Games ===
Girls' doubles
Year	Venue	Partner	Opponent	Score	Result
2014	Otse Police College; Gaborone, Botswana	(Mauritius) Shaama Sandooyea	(Nigeria) Dorcas Ajoke Adesokan (Nigeria) Uchechukwu Deborah Ukeh	15–21, 15–21	Silver

Mixed doubles
Year	Venue	Partner	Opponent	Score	Result
2014	Otse Police College; Gaborone, Botswana	(Mauritius) Julien Paul	(South Africa) Bongani von Bodenstein (South Africa) Anri Schoones	19–21, 21–8, 21–13	Gold

=== African Junior Championships ===
Girls' doubles
Year	Venue	Partner	Opponent	Score	Result
2011	Maputo, Mozambique	(Mauritius) Kate Foo Kune	(South Africa) Sandra le Grange (South Africa) Jennifer van der Berg	11–21, 23–21, 17–21	Bronze
2013	Algiers, Algeria	(Mauritius) Shaama Sandooyea	(Nigeria) Dorcas Ajoke Adesokan (Nigeria) Augustina Ebhomien Sunday	19–21, 19–21	Bronze

Mixed doubles
Year	Venue	Partner	Opponent	Score	Result
2013	Algiers, Algeria	(Mauritius) Julien Paul	(Nigeria) Habeeb Bello (Nigeria) Dorcas Ajoke Adesokan	13–21, 21–17, 21–17	Gold

=== BWF International Challenge/Series ===
Women's singles
Year	Tournament	Opponent	Score	Result
2018	Ghana International	(Israel) Ksenia Polikarpova	5–21, 5–21	(silver) Runner-up

Women's doubles
Year	Tournament	Partner	Opponent	Score	Result
2019	Mauritius International	(Mauritius) Kobita Dookhee	(Malaysia) Kasturi Radhakrishnan (Malaysia) Venosha Radhakrishnan	14–21, 14–21	(silver) Runner-up

Mixed doubles
Year	Tournament	Partner	Opponent	Score	Result
2017	Botswana International	(Mauritius) Julien Paul	(South Africa) Andries Malan (South Africa) Jennifer Fry	15–21, 13–21	(silver) Runner-up
2018	Uganda International	(Mauritius) Julien Paul	(Germany) Jonathan Persson (Mauritius) Kate Foo Kune	11–21, 18–21	(silver) Runner-up
2018	Mauritius International	(Mauritius) Julien Paul	(Maldives) Sarim Mohamed (Maldives) Moosa Aminath Shahurunaz	21–14, 21–6	(gold) Winner

BWF International Challenge tournament
BWF International Series tournament
BWF Future Series tournament
