= 2019 African Badminton Championships =

Tournament details
- Dates: 22–28 April 2019
- Venue: Alfred Diete-Spiff Centre
- Location: Port Harcourt, Nigeria

The 2019 African Badminton Championships was the continental badminton championships to crown the best players and teams across Africa. The tournament was held at the Alfred Diete-Spiff Centre in Port Harcourt, Nigeria, from 22–28 April.

== Medalists ==
Event	Gold	Silver	Bronze
Men's singles	(Nigeria) Anuoluwapo Juwon Opeyori	(Nigeria) Godwin Olofua	(Mauritius) Georges Paul
Men's singles	(Nigeria) Anuoluwapo Juwon Opeyori	(Nigeria) Godwin Olofua	(Nigeria) Clement Krobakpo
Women's singles	(Nigeria) Dorcas Ajoke Adesokan	(Mauritius) ~~Kate Foo Kune~~	(Egypt) Doha Hany
Women's singles	(Nigeria) Dorcas Ajoke Adesokan	(Mauritius) ~~Kate Foo Kune~~	(Nigeria) Zainab Damilola Alabi
Men's doubles	(Algeria) Koceila Mammeri (Algeria) Youcef Sabri Medel	(Nigeria) Enejoh Abah (Nigeria) Isaac Minaphee	(Nigeria) Godwin Olofua (Nigeria) Anuoluwapo Juwon Opeyori
Men's doubles	(Algeria) Koceila Mammeri (Algeria) Youcef Sabri Medel	(Nigeria) Enejoh Abah (Nigeria) Isaac Minaphee	(Egypt) Abdelrahman Abdelhakim (Egypt) Ahmed Salah
Women's doubles	(Nigeria) Dorcas Ajoke Adesokan (Nigeria) Uchechukwu Deborah Ukeh	(Nigeria) Amin Yop Christopher (Nigeria) Chineye Ibere	(Nigeria) Augustina Ebhomien Sunday (Nigeria) Peace Orji
Women's doubles	(Nigeria) Dorcas Ajoke Adesokan (Nigeria) Uchechukwu Deborah Ukeh	(Nigeria) Amin Yop Christopher (Nigeria) Chineye Ibere	(Ghana) Eyram Yaa Migbodzi (Ghana) Perpertual Mensah Quaye
Mixed doubles	(Algeria) Koceila Mammeri (Algeria) Linda Mazri	(Nigeria) Enejoh Abah (Nigeria) Peace Orji	(Egypt) Ahmed Salah (Egypt) Hadia Hosny
Mixed doubles	(Algeria) Koceila Mammeri (Algeria) Linda Mazri	(Nigeria) Enejoh Abah (Nigeria) Peace Orji	(Egypt) Adham Hatem Elgamal (Egypt) Doha Hany
Teams	Nigeria; Anuoluwapo Juwon Opeyori, Clement Krobakpo, Enejoh Abah, Godwin Olofua; Amin Yop Christopher, Chineye Ibere, Dorcas Ajoke Adesokan, Sofiat Arinola Obanishola, Uchechukwu Deborah Ukeh	Mauritius; Aatish Lubah, Christopher Paul, Georges Paul, Jean Bernard Bongout, Melvin Appiah, Tejraj Pultoo; Aurélie Allet, Ganesha Mungrah, Jemimah Leung For Sang, Kate Foo Kune, Kobita Dookhee, Lorna Bodha	Egypt; Abdalla Abdelhakim Hussein, Abdelrahman Abdelhakim, Adham Hatem Elgamal, Ali Ahmed El-Khateeb, Ahmed Salah, Doha Hany, Hadia Hosny, Jana Ashraf, Nour Ahmed Youssri
Teams	Nigeria; Anuoluwapo Juwon Opeyori, Clement Krobakpo, Enejoh Abah, Godwin Olofua; Amin Yop Christopher, Chineye Ibere, Dorcas Ajoke Adesokan, Sofiat Arinola Obanishola, Uchechukwu Deborah Ukeh	Mauritius; Aatish Lubah, Christopher Paul, Georges Paul, Jean Bernard Bongout, Melvin Appiah, Tejraj Pultoo; Aurélie Allet, Ganesha Mungrah, Jemimah Leung For Sang, Kate Foo Kune, Kobita Dookhee, Lorna Bodha	Ghana; Daniel Doe, Daniel Sam, Ebenezer Andrews, Emmanuel Botwe, George Ayittey, Michael Opoku Baah; Diana Archer, Eyram Yaa Migbodzi, Grace Atipaka, Jennifer Abitty, Perpertual Mensah Quaye

In November 2019, Badminton World Federation released a statement regarding doping test failure of Kate Foo Kune in this championships and decided to disqualify her result.

=== Medal table ===
* Host nation (Nigeria)

Rank	Nation	Gold	Silver	Bronze	Total
1	Nigeria*	4	4	4	12
2	Algeria	2	0	0	2
3	Mauritius	0	1	1	2
4	Egypt	0	0	5	5
5	Ghana	0	0	2	2
Totals (5 entries)		6	5	12	23

== Tournament ==
The 2019 African Badminton Championships were held in two separate events. The team event, officially All Africa Mixed Team Championships 2019, was a continental tournament to crown the best team in Africa holding from 22–25 April. The individual event, officially All Africa Individual Championships 2019, was a continental tournament to crown the best players in Africa holding from 26–28 April. A total of 18 countries across Africa registered their players to compete at this event. This year's edition served as the first qualifier for African player to compete at the 2020 Summer Olympics.

The tournament was sponsored by the Rivers State Government and organized by the Badminton Federation of Nigeria; the federation prepared a mascot, Alabo The Shuttler, as a reflection of the culture of the people.

=== Venue ===
This tournament was held at the Alfred Diete-Spiff Centre (Civic Centre), Moscow road, Port Harcourt with six courts.

=== Point distribution ===
The individual event of this tournament was graded based on the BWF points system for the BWF International Challenge event. Below is the table with the point distribution for each phase of the tournament.

Winner	Runner-up	3/4	5/8	9/16	17/32	33/64	65/128
4,000	3,400	2,800	2,200	1,520	920	360	170

== Team event ==
=== Group A ===
Pos	Team	Pld	W	L	MF	MA	MD	GF	GA	GD	PF	PA	PD	Pts	Qualification
1	Egypt	2	2	0	10	0	+10	20	1	+19	439	151	+288	2	Knockout stage
2	Uganda	2	1	1	5	5	0	11	10	+1	361	309	+52	1	Knockout stage
3	DR Congo	2	0	2	0	10	−10	0	20	−20	80	420	−340	0	

Source: TS

==== Egypt vs DR Congo ====
Egypt
5
Alfred Diete-Spiff Centre, Court 2
22 April 2019, 10:00

DR Congo
0

			1	2	3
1	(Egypt) (Democratic Republic of the Congo)	Nour Ahmed Youssri; Katambua Odia	21; 0	21; 0
2	(Egypt) (Democratic Republic of the Congo)	Abdelrahman Abdelhakim; Dimandja Okito	21; 0	21; 0
3	(Egypt) (Democratic Republic of the Congo)	Doha Hany / Hadia Hosny; Bernice Mbuyi Bokotsha / Katambua Odia	21; 0	21; 0
4	(Egypt) (Democratic Republic of the Congo)	Adham Hatem Elgamal / Ali Ahmed El-Khateeb; Zola Wayi / Dimandja Okito	21; 0	21; 0
5	(Egypt) (Democratic Republic of the Congo)	Adham Hatem Elgamal / Doha Hany; Zola Wayi / Bernice Mbuyi Bokotsha	21; 0	21; 0

==== Uganda vs DR Congo ====
Uganda
5
Alfred Diete-Spiff Centre, Court 1
23 April 2019, 10:00

DR Congo
0

			1	2	3
1	(Uganda) (Democratic Republic of the Congo)	Daniel Wanagaliya / Husina Kobugabe; Dimandja Okito / Katambua Odia	21; 8	21; 17
2	(Uganda) (Democratic Republic of the Congo)	Daniel Mihigo; Zola Wayi	21; 3	21; 5
3	(Uganda) (Democratic Republic of the Congo)	Aisha Nakiyemba; Bernice Mbuyi Bokotsha	21; 12	21; 4
4	(Uganda) (Democratic Republic of the Congo)	Alex Babu / Daniel Wanagaliya; Dimandja Okito / Zola Wayi	21; 12	21; 6
5	(Uganda) (Democratic Republic of the Congo)	Gladys Mbabazi / Meble Namakoye; Bernice Mbuyi Bokotsha / Katambua Odia	21; 8	21; 5

==== Egypt vs Uganda ====
Egypt
5
Alfred Diete-Spiff Centre, Court 1
23 April 2019, 17:00

Uganda
0

			1	2	3
1	(Egypt) (Uganda)	Ahmed Salah / Doha Hany; Daniel Mihigo / Meble Namakoye	21; 9	21; 12
2	(Egypt) (Uganda)	Adham Hatem Elgamal; Daniel Wanagaliya	19; 21	21; 13	21; 10
3	(Egypt) (Uganda)	Hadia Hosny; Gladys Mbabazi	21; 16	21; 7
4	(Egypt) (Uganda)	Ahmed Salah / Ali Ahmed El-Khateeb; Daniel Mihigo / Daniel Wanagaliya	21; 14	21; 14
5	(Egypt) (Uganda)	Doha Hany / Hadia Hosny; Gladys Mbabazi / Aisha Nakiyemba	21; 19	21; 16

=== Group B ===
Pos	Team	Pld	W	L	MF	MA	MD	GF	GA	GD	PF	PA	PD	Pts	Qualification
1	Mauritius	2	2	0	10	0	+10	20	1	+19	439	143	+296	2	Knockout stage
2	Zambia	2	1	1	5	5	0	11	11	0	370	384	−14	1	Knockout stage
3	Benin	2	0	2	0	10	−10	1	20	−19	155	437	−282	0	

Source: TS

==== Mauritius vs Benin ====
Mauritius
5
Alfred Diete-Spiff Centre, Court 1
22 April 2019, 10:00

Benin
0

			1	2	3
1	(Mauritius) (Benin)	Julien Paul; Rojuel Assogba	21; 0	21; 0
2	(Mauritius) (Benin)	Ganesha Mungrah; Pascaline Vitou	21; 0	21; 0
3	(Mauritius) (Benin)	Jean Bernard Bongout / Tejraj Pultoo; Gbenoukpo Sebastiano Degbe / Tobiloba Oyewole	21; 0	21; 0
4	(Mauritius) (Benin)	Lorna Bodha / Kobita Dookhee; Adjele Joeline Degbey / Pascaline Vitou	21; 0	21; 0
5	(Mauritius) (Benin)	Julien Paul / Kate Foo Kune; Rojuel Assogba / Xena Arisa	21; 0	21; 0

==== Zambia vs Benin ====
Zambia
5
Alfred Diete-Spiff Centre, Court 2
23 April 2019, 10:00

Benin
0

			1	2	3
1	(Zambia) (Benin)	Kalombo Mulenga; Tobiloba Oyewole	21; 10	21; 18
2	(Zambia) (Benin)	Ogar Siamupangila; Adjele Joeline Degbey	21; 9	21; 12
3	(Zambia) (Benin)	Mark Banda / Kalombo Mulenga; Gbenoukpo Sebastiano Degbe / Tobiloba Oyewole	21; 15	21; 11
4	(Zambia) (Benin)	Evelyn Siamupangila / Ogar Siamupangila; Adjele Joeline Degbey / Pascaline Vitou	17; 21	21; 13	21; 11
5	(Zambia) (Benin)	Mark Banda / Evelyn Siamupangila; Rojuel Assogba / Xena Arisa	21; 16	21; 19

==== Mauritius vs Zambia ====
Mauritius
5
Alfred Diete-Spiff Centre, Court 1
23 April 2019, 17:00

Zambia
0

			1	2	3
1	(Mauritius) (Zambia)	Kate Foo Kune; Evelyn Siamupangila	21; 5	21; 7
2	(Mauritius) (Zambia)	Julien Paul; Kalombo Mulenga	21; 12	19; 21	21; 17
3	(Mauritius) (Zambia)	Lorna Bodha / Kobita Dookhee; Evelyn Siamupangila / Ogar Siamupangila	16; 21	15; 21
4	(Mauritius) (Zambia)	Melvin Appiah / Aatish Lubah; Mark Banda / Donald Mabo	21; 9	21; 18
5	(Mauritius) (Zambia)	Julien Paul / Kate Foo Kune; Kalombo Mulenga / Ogar Siamupangila	21; 5	21; 18

=== Group C ===
Pos	Team	Pld	W	L	MF	MA	MD	GF	GA	GD	PF	PA	PD	Pts	Qualification
1	Ghana	3	3	0	13	2	+11	27	5	+22	626	348	+278	3	Knockout stage
2	Algeria	3	2	1	12	3	+9	25	6	+19	617	321	+296	2	Knockout stage
3	Ivory Coast	3	1	2	4	11	−7	8	22	−14	416	571	−155	1	
4	Togo	3	0	3	1	14	−13	2	28	−26	199	619	−420	0	

Source: TS

==== Algeria vs Togo ====
Algeria
5
Alfred Diete-Spiff Centre, Court 3
22 April 2019, 10:00

Togo
0

			1	2	3
1	(Algeria) (Togo)	Linda Mazri; Azim Issa	21; 0	21; 0
2	(Algeria) (Togo)	Adel Hamek; Malika Dare	21; 0	21; 0
3	(Algeria) (Togo)	Halla Bouksani / Linda Mazri; Rolande Adjima / Malika Dare	21; 0	21; 0
4	(Algeria) (Togo)	Mohamed Abderrahime Belarbi / Youcef Sabri Medel; Koami Vivien Amoussou / Azim Issa	21; 0	21; 0
5	(Algeria) (Togo)	Koceila Mammeri / Halla Bouksani; Koami Vivien Amoussou / Rolande Adjima	21; 0	21; 0

==== Ghana vs Ivory Coast ====
Ghana
5
Alfred Diete-Spiff Centre, Court 4
22 April 2019, 10:00

Ivory Coast
0

			1	2	3
1	(Ghana) (Ivory Coast)	Daniel Sam; Alex Patrick Zolobe	21; 14	21; 8
2	(Ghana) (Ivory Coast)	Grace Atipaka; Aïcha N'Dia	21; 8	21; 8
3	(Ghana) (Ivory Coast)	Daniel Doe / Daniel Sam; Jerome Ibrahim Agnimel / Ousmane Ouedraogo	21; 10	21; 9
4	(Ghana) (Ivory Coast)	Jennifer Abitty / Grace Atipaka; Lou Annick Doulou / Esmé Davila Loess	21; 9	21; 11
5	(Ghana) (Ivory Coast)	Ebenezer Andrews / Eyram Migbodzi; Ousmane Ouedraogo / Lou Annick Doulou	21; 12	21; 13

==== Algeria vs Ivory Coast ====
Algeria
5
Alfred Diete-Spiff Centre, Court 3
23 April 2019, 10:00

Ivory Coast
0

			1	2	3
1	(Algeria) (Ivory Coast)	Malak Ouchefoun; Aïcha N'Dia	24; 22	21; 16
2	(Algeria) (Ivory Coast)	Mohamed Abderrahime Belarbi; Alex Patrick Zolobe	21; 9	21; 13
3	(Algeria) (Ivory Coast)	Halla Bouksani / Linda Mazri; Lou Annick Doulou / Esmé Davila Loess	21; 11	21; 6
4	(Algeria) (Ivory Coast)	Koceila Mammeri / Youcef Sabri Medel; Franck Ahi / Alex Patrick Zolobe	21; 11	21; 9
5	(Algeria) (Ivory Coast)	Adel Hamek / Linda Mazri; Jerome Ibrahim Agnimel / Aïcha N'Dia	21; 9	21; 9

==== Ghana vs Togo ====
Ghana
5
Alfred Diete-Spiff Centre, Court 4
23 April 2019, 10:00

Togo
0

			1	2	3
1	(Ghana) (Togo)	Michael Opoku Baah / Perpetual Quaye; Koami Vivien Amoussou / Rolande Adjima	21; 5	21; 10
2	(Ghana) (Togo)	Ebenezer Andrews; Azim Issa	21; 5	21; 3
3	(Ghana) (Togo)	Grace Atipaka; Malika Dare	21; 1	21; 6
4	(Ghana) (Togo)	George Ayittey / Emmanuel Botwe; Koami Vivien Amoussou / Azim Issa	21; 4	21; 1
5	(Ghana) (Togo)	Jennifer Abitty / Eyram Migbodzi; Rolande Adjima / Malika Dare	21; 10	21; 6

==== Algeria vs Ghana ====
Algeria
2
Alfred Diete-Spiff Centre, Court 3
23 April 2019, 17:00

Ghana
3

			1	2	3
1	(Algeria) (Ghana)	Halla Bouksani; Grace Atipaka	5; 21	4; 21
2	(Algeria) (Ghana)	Adel Hamek; Daniel Sam	18; 21	17; 21
3	(Algeria) (Ghana)	Halla Bouksani / Linda Mazri; Jennifer Abitty / Eyram Migbodzi	21; 7	21; 19
4	(Algeria) (Ghana)	Mohamed Abderrahime Belarbi / Youcef Sabri Medel; Ebenezer Andrews / Michael Opoku Baah	23; 21	21; 18
5	(Algeria) (Ghana)	Koceila Mammeri / Linda Mazri; Daniel Sam / Jennifer Abitty	21; 10	19; 21	24; 26

==== Ivory Coast vs Togo ====
Ivory Coast
4
Alfred Diete-Spiff Centre, Court 4
23 April 2019, 17:00

Togo
1

			1	2	3
1	(Ivory Coast) (Togo)	Jerome Ibrahim Agnimel; Azim Issa	21; 15	21; 13
2	(Ivory Coast) (Togo)	Lou Annick Doulou; Malika Dare	21; 18	21; 10
3	(Ivory Coast) (Togo)	Jean-Yves Tokou / Franck Emmanuel Zolobe; Koami Vivien Amoussou / Azim Issa	21; 18	21; 17
4	(Ivory Coast) (Togo)	Lou Annick Doulou / Aïcha N'Dia; Rolande Adjima / Malika Dare	21; 7	21; 8
5	(Ivory Coast) (Togo)	Franck Emmanuel Zolobe / Lou Annick Doulou; Koami Vivien Amoussou / Rolande Adjima	15; 21	16; 21

=== Group D ===
Pos	Team	Pld	W	L	MF	MA	MD	GF	GA	GD	PF	PA	PD	Pts	Qualification
1	Nigeria	2	2	0	10	0	+10	20	0	+20	420	226	+194	2	Knockout stage
2	South Africa	2	1	1	5	5	0	10	10	0	353	283	+70	1	Knockout stage
3	Zimbabwe	2	0	2	0	10	−10	0	20	−20	156	420	−264	0	

Source: TS

==== Nigeria vs South Africa ====
Nigeria
5
Alfred Diete-Spiff Centre, Court 5
22 April 2019, 10:00

South Africa
0

			1	2	3
1	(Nigeria) (South Africa)	Enejoh Abah / Peace Orji; Bongani von Bodenstein / Michelle Butler-Emmett	21; 15	21; 10
2	(Nigeria) (South Africa)	Anuoluwapo Juwon Opeyori; Ruan Snyman	21; 10	21; 14
3	(Nigeria) (South Africa)	Dorcas Ajoke Adesokan; Johanita Scholtz	21; 13	21; 15
4	(Nigeria) (South Africa)	Godwin Olofua / Anuoluwapo Juwon Opeyori; Jarred Elliott / Bongani von Bodenstein	21; 16	21; 17
5	(Nigeria) (South Africa)	Dorcas Ajoke Adesokan / Uchechukwu Deborah Ukeh; Michelle Butler-Emmett / Elme de Villiers	21; 19	21; 14

==== Zimbabwe vs South Africa ====
Zimbabwe
0
Alfred Diete-Spiff Centre, Court 5
23 April 2019, 10:00

South Africa
5

			1	2	3
1	(Zimbabwe) (South Africa)	Ashel Dziva / Tritania Mudzamiri; Bongani von Bodenstein / Michelle Butler-Emmett	12; 21	8; 21
2	(Zimbabwe) (South Africa)	Thabani Mathe; Ruan Snyman	6; 21	12; 21
3	(Zimbabwe) (South Africa)	Mitchelle Gaza; Johanita Scholtz	1; 21	6; 21
4	(Zimbabwe) (South Africa)	Raffick Alfonso / Paul Kopolo; Jarred Elliott / Sean Noone	13; 21	12; 21
5	(Zimbabwe) (South Africa)	Mitchelle Gaza / Tritania Mudzamiri; Megan de Beer / Elme de Villiers	1; 21	2; 21

==== Nigeria vs Zimbabwe ====
Nigeria
5
Alfred Diete-Spiff Centre, Court 5
23 April 2019, 17:00

Zimbabwe
0

			1	2	3
1	(Nigeria) (Zimbabwe)	Habeeb Bello / Amin Yop Christopher; Raffick Alfonso / Mitchelle Gaza	21; 15	21; 10
2	(Nigeria) (Zimbabwe)	Clement Krobakpo; Thabani Mathe	21; 15	21; 10
3	(Nigeria) (Zimbabwe)	Sofiat Arinola Obanishola; Tritania Mudzamiri	21; 1	21; 3
4	(Nigeria) (Zimbabwe)	Gideon Babalola / Clement Krobakpo; Ashel Dziva / Paul Kopolo	21; 11	21; 10
5	(Nigeria) (Zimbabwe)	Amin Yop Christopher / Chineye Ibere; Mitchelle Gaza / Tritania Mudzamiri	21; 6	21; 2

=== Knockout stage ===
Quarter-finals
Mauritius	3
Algeria	1
Egypt	3
Zambia	0
South Africa	2
Ghana	3
Uganda	0
Nigeria	3

Semi-finals
Mauritius	3
Egypt	0
Ghana	0
Nigeria	3

Final
Mauritius	2
Nigeria	3

==== Quarter-finals ====
Mauritius
3
Alfred Diete-Spiff Centre, Court 1
24 April 2019, 10:00

Algeria
1

			1	2	3
1	(Mauritius) (Algeria)	Aatish Lubah / Kobita Dookhee; Koceila Mammeri / Linda Mazri	19; 21	6; 21
2	(Mauritius) (Algeria)	Julien Paul; Adel Hamek	21; 17	10; 21	21; 15
3	(Mauritius) (Algeria)	Kate Foo Kune; Malak Ouchefoun	21; 9	21; 5
4	(Mauritius) (Algeria)	Aatish Lubah / Julien Paul; Mohamed Abderrahime Belarbi / Youcef Sabri Medel	21; 15	21; 10
5	(Mauritius) (Algeria)	Kate Foo Kune / Kobita Dookhee; Linda Mazri / Malak Ouchefoun				not played

Egypt
3
Alfred Diete-Spiff Centre, Court 4
24 April 2019, 10:00

Zambia
0

			1	2	3
1	(Egypt) (Zambia)	Adham Hatem Elgamal; Kalombo Mulenga	21; 17	21; 19
2	(Egypt) (Zambia)	Doha Hany; Evelyn Siamupangila	21; 11	21; 10
3	(Egypt) (Zambia)	Ali Ahmed El-Khateeb / Ahmed Salah; Mark Banda / Mwansa Mulenga	21; 8	21; 9
4	(Egypt) (Zambia)	Doha Hany / Hadia Hosny; Evelyn Siamupangila / Ogar Siamupangila				not played
5	(Egypt) (Zambia)	Ahmed Salah / Hadia Hosny; Kalombo Mulenga / Ogar Siamupangila				not played

South Africa
2
Alfred Diete-Spiff Centre, Court 2
24 April 2019, 10:00

Ghana
3

			1	2	3
1	(South Africa) (Ghana)	Ruan Snyman; Daniel Sam	8; 21	17; 21
2	(South Africa) (Ghana)	Johanita Scholtz; Grace Atipaka	21; 9	21; 4
3	(South Africa) (Ghana)	Sean Noone / Bongani von Bodenstein; Ebenezer Andrews / Michael Opoku Baah	16; 21	20; 22
4	(South Africa) (Ghana)	Michelle Butler-Emmett / Johanita Scholtz; Grace Atipaka / Eyram Migbodzi	21; 7	21; 6
5	(South Africa) (Ghana)	Bongani von Bodenstein / Michelle Butler-Emmett; Daniel Sam / Jennifer Abitty	17; 21	19; 21

Uganda
0
Alfred Diete-Spiff Centre, Court 3
24 April 2019, 10:00

Nigeria
3

			1	2	3
1	(Uganda) (Nigeria)	Daniel Mihigo; Anuoluwapo Juwon Opeyori	9; 21	12; 21
2	(Uganda) (Nigeria)	Aisha Nakiyemba; Dorcas Ajoke Adesokan	7; 21	9; 21
3	(Uganda) (Nigeria)	Alex Babu / Daniel Wanagaliya; Godwin Olofua / Anuoluwapo Juwon Opeyori	12; 21	9; 21
4	(Uganda) (Nigeria)	Gladys Mbabazi / Aisha Nakiyemba; Dorcas Ajoke Adesokan / Uchechukwu Deborah Ukeh				not played
5	(Uganda) (Nigeria)	Daniel Wanagaliya / Husina Kobugabe; Enejoh Abah / Peace Orji				not played

==== Semi-finals ====
Mauritius
3
Alfred Diete-Spiff Centre, Court 1
24 April 2019, 18:00

Egypt
0

			1	2	3
1	(Mauritius) (Egypt)	Aatish Lubah; Abdelrahman Abdelhakim	21; 16	21; 11
2	(Mauritius) (Egypt)	Kate Foo Kune; Doha Hany	21; 14	10; 21	21; 12
3	(Mauritius) (Egypt)	Aatish Lubah / Julien Paul; Adham Hatem Elgamal / Ali Ahmed El-Khateeb	21; 14	18; 21	21; 14
4	(Mauritius) (Egypt)	Aurélie Allet / Lorna Bodha; Doha Hany / Hadia Hosny				not played
5	(Mauritius) (Egypt)	Julien Paul / Kate Foo Kune; Ahmed Salah / Hadia Hosny				not played

Ghana
0
Alfred Diete-Spiff Centre, Court 2
24 April 2019, 18:00

Nigeria
3

			1	2	3
1	(Ghana) (Nigeria)	Daniel Sam / Eyram Migbodzi; Enejoh Abah / Peace Orji	16; 21	12; 21
2	(Ghana) (Nigeria)	Ebenezer Andrews; Anuoluwapo Juwon Opeyori	16; 21	9; 21
3	(Ghana) (Nigeria)	Grace Atipaka; Dorcas Ajoke Adesokan	14; 21	9; 21
4	(Ghana) (Nigeria)	Ebenezer Andrews / Daniel Sam; Godwin Olofua / Anuoluwapo Juwon Opeyori				not played
5	(Ghana) (Nigeria)	Grace Atipaka / Eyram Migbodzi; Dorcas Ajoke Adesokan / Uchechukwu Deborah Ukeh				not played

==== Final ====
Mauritius
2
Alfred Diete-Spiff Centre, Court 1
25 April 2019, 18:00

Nigeria
3

			1	2	3
1	(Mauritius) (Nigeria)	Aatish Lubah; Anuoluwapo Juwon Opeyori	11; 21	16; 21
2	(Mauritius) (Nigeria)	Kate Foo Kune; Dorcas Ajoke Adesokan	21; 12	21; 16
3	(Mauritius) (Nigeria)	Aatish Lubah / Julien Paul; Enejoh Abah / Clement Krobakpo	21; 14	16; 21	21; 11
4	(Mauritius) (Nigeria)	Aurélie Allet / Lorna Bodha; Dorcas Ajoke Adesokan / Uchechukwu Deborah Ukeh	8; 21	10; 21
5	(Mauritius) (Nigeria)	Julien Paul / Kate Foo Kune; Anuoluwapo Juwon Opeyori / Dorcas Ajoke Adesokan	19; 21	19; 21

== Individual event ==
=== Men's singles ===
==== Seeds ====
1. (Mauritius) Georges Paul (semifinals)
2. (Nigeria) Anuoluwapo Juwon Opeyori (champions)
3. (Nigeria) Godwin Olofua (final)
4. (Egypt) Adham Hatem Elgamal (second round)
5. (Egypt) Ahmed Salah (quarterfinals)
6. (Ghana) Daniel Sam (third round)
7. (Mauritius) Melvin Appiah (third round)
8. (Nigeria) Habeeb Temitope Bello (third round)

==== Finals ====
Semi-finals
1	(Mauritius) Georges Paul	21	14	19
3	(Nigeria) Godwin Olofua	13	21	21
(Nigeria) Clement Krobakpo	10	8
2	(Nigeria) Anuoluwapo Juwon Opeyori	21	21

Final
3	(Nigeria) Godwin Olofua	17	21	17
2	(Nigeria) Anuoluwapo Juwon Opeyori	21	16	21

==== Top half ====
===== Section 1 =====
First Round
(Algeria) M A Belarbi	21	21
(Zimbabwe) P Kopolo	7	16
(Nigeria) A A Shehu	21	21
(Ivory Coast) F Ahi	9	8
(Togo) A Issa	11	11
(Uganda) I Wanagalya	21	21
(Democratic Republic of the Congo) D J Okito	16	6
(Seychelles) J Renaud	21	21
(Nigeria) G Babalola	21	21
(Egypt) A A Hussein	8	14

Second Round
1	(Mauritius) G Paul	21	21
(Algeria) M A Belarbi	10	13
(South Africa) S Noone	13	8
(Nigeria) A A Shehu	21	21
6	(Ghana) D Sam	21	17	24
(Uganda) I Wanagalya	10	21	22
(Seychelles) J Renaud	7	13
(Nigeria) G Babalola	21	21

Third Round
1	(Mauritius) G Paul	21	21
(Nigeria) A A Shehu	15	16
6	(Ghana) D Sam	21	13
(Nigeria) G Babalola	23	21

Quarter-finals
1	(Mauritius) G Paul	22	21
(Nigeria) G Babalola	20	12

===== Section 2 =====
First Round
(Seychelles) J Luo	21	6	9
(Mauritius) A Lubah	19	21	21
(Ivory Coast) A J I Agnimel	14	12
(Egypt) A Abdelhakim	21	21
(Ghana) E Andrews	18	21	21
(Benin) T Oyewole	21	15	12
(Ghana) E Botwe	6	6
(South Africa) B Von Bodenstein	21	21
(Zimbabwe) T Mathe	14	9
(Mauritius) C Paul	21	21
(Uganda) F Kirabo	9	10
(Algeria) K Mammeri	21	21

Second Round
3	(Nigeria) G Olofua	21	21
(Mauritius) A Lubah	8	19
(Egypt) A Abdelhakim	21	21
(Ghana) E Andrews	18	17
5	(Egypt) A Salah	21	21
(South Africa) B Von Bodenstein	7	12
(Mauritius) C Paul	16	18
(Algeria) K Mammeri	21	21

Third Round
3	(Nigeria) G Olofua	21	21
(Egypt) A Abdelhakim	16	10
5	(Egypt) A Salah	21	21
(Algeria) K Mammeri	10	19

Quarter-finals
3	(Nigeria) G Olofua	16	21	21
5	(Egypt) A Salah	21	14	12

==== Bottom half ====
===== Section 3 =====
First Round
(Mauritius) J B Bongout	21	21
(Zimbabwe) R Alfonso	14	8
(Ivory Coast) O Ouedraogo	15	15
(Uganda) A Babu	21	21
(Eritrea) L Semere	8	10
(Algeria) A Hamek	21	21
(Benin) G S Degbe	22	8	21
(Ivory Coast) A Zolobe	20	21	14
(Uganda) D Mihigo	19	15
(Ghana) M O Baah	21	21
(Nigeria) C Krobakpo	21	21
(South Africa) J Elliott	10	10

Second Round
(Mauritius) J B Bongout	21	21
(Uganda) A Babu	15	15
(Algeria) A Hamek	1^{r}
8	(Nigeria) H T Bello	3
(Benin) G S Degbe	8	11
(Ghana) M O Baah	21	21
(Nigeria) C Krobakpo	21	15	21
4	(Egypt) A H Elgamal	15	21	15

Third Round
(Mauritius) J B Bongout	21	21
8	(Nigeria) H T Bello	18	16
(Ghana) M O Baah	14	12
(Nigeria) C Krobakpo	21	21

Quarter-finals
(Mauritius) J B Bongout	15	14
(Nigeria) C Krobakpo	21	21

===== Section 4 =====
First Round
(Ivory Coast) J Y Tokou	7	12
(Algeria) Y S Medel	21	21
(Togo) K V Amoussou	21	15	21
(Zimbabwe) A Dziva	15	21	18
(Uganda) D Senono	28	13	21
(Seychelles) K Ghislain	26	21	16
(South Africa) R Snyman	13	21	21
(Ghana) G Ayittey	21	16	15
(Benin) C T R Assogba	11	12
(Egypt) A A El-Khateeb	21	21

Second Round
(Algeria) Y S Medel	21	21
(Togo) K V Amoussou	6	7
(Uganda) D Senono	10	20
7	(Mauritius) M Appiah	21	22
(South Africa) R Snyman	21	21
(Democratic Republic of the Congo) Z Wapi	4	6
(Egypt) A A El-Khateeb	13	11
2	(Nigeria) A J Opeyori	21	21

Third Round
(Algeria) Y S Medel	19	21	26
7	(Mauritius) M Appiah	21	14	24
(South Africa) R Snyman	10	15
2	(Nigeria) A J Opeyori	21	21

Quarter-finals
(Algeria) Y S Medel	10	10
2	(Nigeria) A J Opeyori	21	21

=== Women's singles ===
==== Seeds ====
1. (Mauritius) Kate Foo Kune (final)
2. (Egypt) Hadia Hosny (second round)
3. (Nigeria) Dorcas Ajoke Adesokan (champions)
4. (Egypt) Doha Hany (semifinals)
5. (Uganda) Aisha Nakiyemba (third round)
6. (Ivory Coast) Aïcha Laurene N'Dia (second round)
7. (Nigeria) Chineye Ibere (quarterfinals)
8. (Mauritius) Kobita Dookhee (second round)

==== Finals ====
Semi-finals
1	(Mauritius) Kate Foo Kune	21	21
4	(Egypt) Doha Hany	16	13
3	(Nigeria) Dorcas Ajoke Adesokan	22	21
(Nigeria) Zainab Damilola Alabi	20	19

Final
1	(Mauritius) Kate Foo Kune	12	13
3	(Nigeria) Dorcas Ajoke Adesokan	21	21

==== Top half ====
===== Section 1 =====
First Round
(Mauritius) L Bodha	21	21
(Democratic Republic of the Congo) M B Bokotsha	7	6
(South Africa) J Scholtz	21	21
(Mauritius) G Mungrah	15	12

Second Round
1	(Mauritius) K Foo Kune	21	11
(Uganda) B Awor	8	4^{r}
(Nigeria) A Ebhomien Sunday	21	21
(Mauritius) L Bodha	17	19
5	(Uganda) A Nakiyemba	21	21
(Benin) X Arisa	8	12
(Mauritius) J Leung For Sang	7	6
(South Africa) J Scholtz	21	21

Third Round
1	(Mauritius) K Foo Kune	22	21
(Nigeria) A Ebhomien Sunday	20	15
5	(Uganda) A Nakiyemba	13	23	16
(South Africa) J Scholtz	21	21	21

Quarter-finals
1	(Mauritius) K Foo Kune	21	19	27
(South Africa) J Scholtz	18	21	25

===== Section 2 =====
First Round
(Seychelles) A Camille	21	21
(Algeria) L Mazri	17	17
(Nigeria) U D Ukeh	21	21
(Uganda) G Atipaka	13	16
(Eritrea) K Heyelom	13	18
(Ivory Coast) E O D Loess	21	21

Second Round
4	(Egypt) D Hany	21	21
(Uganda) H Kobugabe	11	11
(Benin) A J Degbey	13	7
(Seychelles) A Camille	21	21
7	(Nigeria) C Ibere	17	21	21
(Nigeria) U D Ukeh	21	16	16
(Ghana) P M Quaye	21	23
(Ivory Coast) E O D Loess	18	21

Third Round
4	(Egypt) D Hany	21	21
(Seychelles) A Camille	17	10
7	(Nigeria) C Ibere	21	21
(Ghana) P M Quaye	13	8

Quarter-finals
4	(Egypt) D Hany	21	21
7	(Nigeria) C Ibere	9	17

==== Bottom half ====
===== Section 3 =====
First Round
(Ivory Coast) L G T A Doulou	14	16
(Algeria) H Bouksani	21	21
(South Africa) M De Beer	21	21
(Ghana) J Abitty	4	10
(Egypt) J Ashraf	21	21
(Democratic Republic of the Congo) K Odia	9	8

Second Round
(Algeria) H Bouksani	22	21
(Togo) R Adjima	20	7
(South Africa) M De Beer	21	21	21
8	(Mauritius) K Dookhee	14	23	6
(Egypt) J Ashraf	21	21
(Benin) P L Y Vitou	19	5
(Zimbabwe) M Gaza	3	3
3	(Nigeria) D A Adesokan	21	21

Third Round
(Algeria) H Bouksani
(South Africa) M De Beer	w	/	o
(Egypt) J Ashraf	12	12
3	(Nigeria) D A Adesokan	21	21

Quarter-finals
(South Africa) M De Beer	10	18
3	(Nigeria) D A Adesokan	21	21

===== Section 4 =====
First Round
(Zimbabwe) K T Mudzamiri	5	4
(Algeria) M Ouchefoun	21	21
(Uganda) G Mbabazi	22	21
(South Africa) M Butler-Emmett	20	14
(Egypt) N Ahmed Youssri	21	21
(Ghana) E Y Migbodzi	7	5

Second Round
(Algeria) M Ouchefoun	21	21
(Uganda) M Namakoye	7	14
(Uganda) G Mbabazi	21	21
6	(Ivory Coast) A L N'Dia	12	6
(Egypt) N Ahmed Youssri	17	21	21
(South Africa) E M De Villers	21	16	16
(Nigeria) Z D Alabi	21	21
2	(Egypt) H Hosny	15	14

Third Round
(Algeria) M Ouchefoun	16	19
(Uganda) G Mbabazi	21	21
(Egypt) N Ahmed Youssri	12	17
(Nigeria) Z D Alabi	21	21

Quarter-finals
(Uganda) G Mbabazi	17	21	14
(Nigeria) Z D Alabi	21	19	21

=== Men's doubles ===
==== Seeds ====
1. (Nigeria) Godwin Olofua / Anuoluwapo Juwon Opeyori (semifinals)
2. (Algeria) Mohamed Abderrahime Belarbi / Adel Hamek (second round)
3. (Algeria) Koceila Mammeri / Youcef Sabri Medel (champions)
4. (Egypt) Abdelrahman Abdelhakim / Ahmed Salah (semifinals)

==== Finals ====
Semi-finals
1	(Nigeria) Godwin Olofua (Nigeria) Anuoluwapo Juwon Opeyori	21	16	16
3	(Algeria) Koceila Mammeri (Algeria) Youcef Sabri Medel	18	21	21
4	(Egypt) Abdelrahman Abdelhakim (Egypt) Ahmed Salah	13	10
(Nigeria) Enejoh Abah (Nigeria) Isaac Minaphee	21	21

Final
3	(Algeria) Koceila Mammeri (Algeria) Youcef Sabri Medel	21	21
(Nigeria) Enejoh Abah (Nigeria) Isaac Minaphee	18	17

==== Top half ====
===== Section 1 =====
First Round
(Benin) G S Degbe (Benin) T Oyewole	16	11
(Mauritius) M Appiah (Mauritius) A Lubah	21	21

Second Round
1	(Nigeria) G Olofua (Nigeria) A J Opeyori	21	21
(Togo) K V Amoussou (Togo) A Issa	5	5
(Ivory Coast) F Ahi (Ivory Coast) A Zolobe	7	8
(Mauritius) M Appiah (Mauritius) A Lubah	21	21

Quarter-finals
1	(Nigeria) G Olofua (Nigeria) A J Opeyori	13	21	21
(Mauritius) M Appiah (Mauritius) A Lubah	21	11	10

===== Section 2 =====
First Round
(Zimbabwe) A Dziva (Zimbabwe) T Mathe	13	14
(South Africa) J Elliott (South Africa) S Noone	21	21
(Uganda) F Kirabo (Uganda) I Senfuka	15	21	6
(Egypt) A A El-Khateeb (Egypt) A H Elgamal	21	18	21

Second Round
3	(Algeria) K Mammeri (Algeria) Y S Medel	21	21
(South Africa) J Elliott (South Africa) S Noone	13	13
(Ghana) D Doe (Ghana) D Sam	14	21	6
(Egypt) A A El-Khateeb (Egypt) A H Elgamal	21	19	21

Quarter-finals
3	(Algeria) K Mammeri (Algeria) Y S Medel	21	21
(Egypt) A A El-Khateeb (Egypt) A H Elgamal	19	13

==== Bottom half ====
===== Section 3 =====
First Round
(Mauritius) J B Bongout (Mauritius) T Pultoo	21	21
(Democratic Republic of the Congo) D J Okito (Democratic Republic of the Congo) Z Wapi	6	8
(Seychelles) K Ghislain (Seychelles) J Luo	21	15	21
(Ghana) E Andrews (Ghana) M O Baah	19	21	9

Second Round
(Mauritius) J B Bongout (Mauritius) T Pultoo	21	15	21
(South Africa) R Snyman (South Africa) B Von Bodenstein	16	21	16
(Seychelles) K Ghislain (Seychelles) J Luo	15	21	16
4	(Egypt) A Abdelhakim (Egypt) A Salah	21	19	21

Quarter-finals
(Mauritius) J B Bongout (Mauritius) T Pultoo	21	14	18
4	(Egypt) A Abdelhakim (Egypt) A Salah	11	21	21

===== Section 4 =====
First Round
(Ivory Coast) A J I Agnimel (Ivory Coast) O Ouedraogo	21	21
(Zimbabwe) R Alfonso (Zimbabwe) P Kopolo	13	17
(Uganda) A Babu (Uganda) I Wanagalya	6	9
(Nigeria) E Abah (Nigeria) I Minaphee	21	21

Second Round
(Ivory Coast) A J I Agnimel (Ivory Coast) O Ouedraogo	8	11
(Nigeria) G Babalola (Nigeria) C Krobakpo	21	21
(Nigeria) E Abah (Nigeria) I Minaphee	w	/	o
2	(Algeria) M A Belarbi (Algeria) A Hamek

Quarter-finals
(Nigeria) G Babalola (Nigeria) C Krobakpo	20	18
(Nigeria) E Abah (Nigeria) I Minaphee	22	21

=== Women's doubles ===
==== Seeds ====
1. (Egypt) Doha Hany / Hadia Hosny (quarterfinals)
2. (Algeria) Halla Bouksani / Linda Mazri (second round)
3. (Mauritius) Aurélie Allet / Kobita Dookhee (quarterfinals)
4. (Mauritius) Jemimah Leung For Sang / Ganesha Mungrah (second round)

==== Finals ====
Semi-finals
(Nigeria) Augustina Ebhomien Sunday (Nigeria) Peace Orji	16	14
(Nigeria) Amin Yop Christopher (Nigeria) Chineye Ibere	21	21
(Ghana) Eyram Yaa Migbodzi (Ghana) Perpertual Mensah Quaye	11	7
(Nigeria) Dorcas Ajoke Adesokan (Nigeria) Uchechukwu Deborah Ukeh	21	21

Final
(Nigeria) Amin Yop Christopher (Nigeria) Chineye Ibere	14	22	17
(Nigeria) Dorcas Ajoke Adesokan (Nigeria) Uchechukwu Deborah Ukeh	21	20	21

==== Top half ====
===== Section 1 =====
First Round	Second Round				Quarter-finals
	1	(Egypt) D Hany (Egypt) H Hosny	21	21
		(Ghana) J Abitty (Ghana) G Atipaka	11	8
					1	(Egypt) D Hany (Egypt) H Hosny	16	16
						(Nigeria) A Ebhomien Sunday (Nigeria) P Orji	21	21
	(Nigeria) A Ebhomien Sunday (Nigeria) P Orji		21	21
	(South Africa) M Butler-Emmett (South Africa) E M De Villers		17	13

===== Section 2 =====
First Round
(Nigeria) A Y Christopher (Nigeria) C Ibere	w	/	o
(Uganda) B Apio (Uganda) B Awor

Second Round
3	(Mauritius) A Allet (Mauritius) K Dookhee	21	21
(Benin) X Arisa (Benin) A J Degbey	8	8
(Ivory Coast) E O D Loess (Ivory Coast) A L N'Dia	4	6
(Nigeria) A Y Christopher (Nigeria) C Ibere	21	21

Quarter-finals
3	(Mauritius) A Allet (Mauritius) K Dookhee	18	13
(Nigeria) A Y Christopher (Nigeria) C Ibere	21	21

==== Bottom half ====
===== Section 3 =====
First Round
(Togo) R Ajima (Togo) M Dare	12	8
(Ghana) E Y Migbodzi (Ghana) P M Quaye	21	21

Second Round
(Ghana) E Y Migbodzi (Ghana) P M Quaye	21	21
(Democratic Republic of the Congo) M B Bokotsha (Democratic Republic of the Congo) K Odia	11	7
(Zimbabwe) M Gaza (Zimbabwe) K T Mudzamiri	w	/	o
4	(Mauritius) J Leung For Sang (Mauritius) G Mungrah

Quarter-finals
(Ghana) E Y Migbodzi (Ghana) P M Quaye	w	/	o
(Zimbabwe) M Gaza (Zimbabwe) K T Mudzamiri

===== Section 4 =====
First Round
(South Africa) M De Beer (South Africa) J Scholtz	21	21
(Uganda) G Mbabazi (Uganda) A Nakiyemba	15	8

Second Round
(South Africa) M De Beer (South Africa) J Scholtz	21	21
(Egypt) N Ahmed Youssri (Egypt) J Ashraf	13	13
' (Nigeria) D A Adesokan (Nigeria) U D Ukeh	w	/	o
2	(Algeria) H Bouksani (Algeria) L Mazri

Quarter-finals
(South Africa) M De Beer (South Africa) J Scholtz	19	15
(Nigeria) D A Adesokan (Nigeria) U D Ukeh	21	21

=== Mixed doubles ===
==== Seeds ====
1. (Egypt) Ahmed Salah / Hadia Hosny (semifinals)
2. (Egypt) Adham Hatem Elgamal / Doha Hany (semifinals)
3. (Nigeria) Enejoh Abah / Peace Orji (final)
4. (Mauritius) Tejraj Pultoo / Kobita Dookhee (quarterfinals)
5. (Ivory Coast) Alex Zolobe / Lou Gohi Theophile Annick Doulou (second round)
6. (Nigeria) Kayode Abubakar Mope / Amin Yop Christopher (third round)
7. (Ghana) Ebenezer Andrews / Grace Atipaka (third round)
8. (Ivory Coast) Ousmane Ouedraogo / Esme Osseane Davila Loess (second round)

==== Finals ====
Semi-finals
1	(Egypt) Ahmed Salah (Egypt) Hadia Hosny	23	17	13
(Algeria) Koceila Mammeri (Algeria) Linda Mazri	21	21	21
3	(Nigeria) Enejoh Abah (Nigeria) Peace Orji	21	21
2	(Egypt) Adham Hatem Elgamal (Egypt) Doha Hany	15	12

Final
(Algeria) Koceila Mammeri (Algeria) Linda Mazri	15	21	21
3	(Nigeria) Enejoh Abah (Nigeria) Peace Orji	21	16	18

==== Top half ====
===== Section 1 =====
First Round
(Democratic Republic of the Congo) Z Wapi (Democratic Republic of the Congo) M B Bokotsha	6	9
(South Africa) J Elliott (South Africa) M De Beer	21	21

Second Round
1	(Egypt) A Salah (Egypt) H Hosny	21	21
(Togo) K V Amoussou (Togo) R Adjima	8	10
(Seychelles) J Luo (Seychelles) A Camille	21	21
(Zimbabwe) T Mathe (Zimbabwe) K T Mudzamiri	6	9
5	(Ivory Coast) A Zolobe (Ivory Coast) L G Doulou	16	23	7
(Benin) T Oyewole (Benin) X Arisa	21	21	21
(Uganda) D Mihigo (Uganda) M Namakoye	6	13
(South Africa) J Elliott (South Africa) M De Beer	21	21

Third Round
1	(Egypt) A Salah (Egypt) H Hosny	21	21
(Seychelles) J Luo (Seychelles) A Camille	19	17
(Benin) T Oyewole (Benin) X Arisa	17	21	10
(South Africa) J Elliott (South Africa) M De Beer	21	19	21

Quarter-finals
1	(Egypt) A Salah (Egypt) H Hosny	21	21
(South Africa) J Elliott (South Africa) M De Beer	12	9

===== Section 2 =====
First Round
(Algeria) K Mammeri (Algeria) L Mazri	21	21
(Nigeria) H T Bello (Nigeria) R Yakubu	17	7

Second Round
4	(Mauritius) T Pultoo (Mauritius) K Dookhee	12	22	21
(Ghana) D Doe (Ghana) E Y Migbodzi	21	20	12
(South Africa) S Noone (South Africa) E M De Villers	18	11
(Mauritius) G Paul (Mauritius) K Foo Kune	21	21
6	(Nigeria) K A Mope (Nigeria) A Y Christopher	21	21
(Egypt) A Abdelhakim (Egypt) J Ashraf	19	18
(Benin) C T R Assogba (Benin) A J Degbey	15	7
(Algeria) K Mammeri (Algeria) L Mazri	21	21

Third Round
4	(Mauritius) T Pultoo (Mauritius) K Dookhee	22	8	21
(Mauritius) G Paul (Mauritius) K Foo Kune	20	21	18
6	(Nigeria) K A Mope (Nigeria) A Y Christopher	14	17
(Algeria) K Mammeri (Algeria) L Mazri	21	21

Quarter-finals
4	(Mauritius) T Pultoo (Mauritius) K Dookhee	21	19
(Algeria) K Mammeri (Algeria) L Mazri	23	21

==== Bottom half ====
===== Section 3 =====
First Round
(Egypt) A A El-Khateeb (Egypt) N Ahmed Youssri	18	16
(Ghana) D Sam (Ghana) J Abitty	21	21
(South Africa) R Snyman (South Africa) M Butler-Emmett	21	21
(Benin) G S Degbe (Benin) P L Y Vitou	7	13

Second Round
(Ghana) D Sam (Ghana) J Abitty	16	21	22
(South Africa) B Von Bodenstein (South Africa) J Scholtz	21	17	20
(Mauritius) A Lubah (Mauritius) A Allet	21	21
8	(Ivory Coast) O Ouedraogo (Ivory Coast) E O D Loess	11	3
(South Africa) R Snyman (South Africa) M Butler-Emmett	15	21	19
(Mauritius) C Paul (Mauritius) L Bodha	21	19	21
(Ghana) M O Baah (Ghana) P M Quaye	17	8
3	(Nigeria) E Abah (Nigeria) P Orji	21	21

Third Round
(Ghana) D Sam (Ghana) J Abitty	10	21	21
(Mauritius) A Lubah (Mauritius) A Allet	21	18	18
(Mauritius) C Paul (Mauritius) L Bodha	13	10
3	(Nigeria) E Abah (Nigeria) P Orji	21	21

Quarter-finals
(Ghana) D Sam (Ghana) J Abitty	21	6	3^{r}
3	(Nigeria) E Abah (Nigeria) P Orji	17	21	13

===== Section 4 =====
First Round
(Uganda) I Wanagalya (Uganda) B Apio	21	21
(Ivory Coast) A J I Agnimel (Ivory Coast) A L N'Dia	9	12

Second Round
(Uganda) I Wanagalya (Uganda) B Apio	15	19
(Nigeria) I Minaphee (Nigeria) Z D Alabi	21	21
(Uganda) D Senono (Uganda) H Kobugabe	12	20
7	(Ghana) E Andrews (Ghana) G A Atipaka	21	22
(Togo) A Issa (Togo) M Dare	15	13
(Zimbabwe) P Kopolo (Zimbabwe) M Gaza	21	21
(Democratic Republic of the Congo) D J Okito (Democratic Republic of the Congo) K Odia	10	5
2	(Egypt) A H Elgamal (Egypt) D Hany	21	21

Third Round
(Nigeria) I Minaphee (Nigeria) Z D Alabi	21	21
7	(Ghana) E Andrews (Ghana) G A Atipaka	11	16
(Zimbabwe) P Kopolo (Zimbabwe) M Gaza	10	8
2	(Egypt) A H Elgamal (Egypt) D Hany	21	21

Quarter-finals
(Nigeria) I Minaphee (Nigeria) Z D Alabi	13	21	13
2	(Egypt) A H Elgamal (Egypt) D Hany	21	19	21
