= Moroccan Royal Badminton Federation =

- Sport: Badminton
- Abbreviation: FRMBA
- Founded: 1992
- Affiliation: Badminton World Federation
- Affiliation date: 1993
- Headquarters: Rabat
- President: Omar Bellali

The Moroccan Royal Badminton Federation is the governing body for badminton in Morocco.

Created in 1992, the F.R.M.BA is a member of the W.B.F / B.C.A. since 1993. Omar Bellali is the president.

== See also ==
- The Royal Moroccan Golf Federation
- Moroccan Royal Gymnastics Federation
