= Shaama Sandooyea =

Mauritian badminton player (born 1997)

Personal information
- Born: 7 January 1997 (age 29)

Sport
- Country: Mauritius
- Sport: Badminton

Women's singles & doubles
- Highest ranking: 369 (WS 13 February 2014); 325 (WD 16 January 2014); 613 (XD 13 September 2012)
- BWF profile
Medal record
Women's badminton
Representing Mauritius
Africa Team Championships
Bronze medal – third place	2020 Cairo	Women's team
African Youth Games
Silver medal – second place	2014 Gaborone	Girls' doubles
Bronze medal – third place	2014 Gaborone	Girls' singles
Bronze medal – third place	2014 Gaborone	Mixed team

Shaama Sandooyea (born 7 January 1997) is a Mauritian badminton player, a climate activist and a marine biologist. Sandooyea competed at the 2014 African Youth Games, and won a silver and a bronze medal in the girls' doubles and singles respectively. She also helped the team claim the bronze medal.

In March 2021, while in a research mission with Greenpeace, she was part of the first underwater protest of the global climate strike.

== Achievements ==
=== African Youth Games ===
Girls' singles
Year	Venue	Opponent	Score	Result
2014	Otse Police College; Gaborone, Botswana	(South Africa) Janke van der Vyver	21–23, 16–21	Bronze

Girls' doubles
Year	Venue	Partner	Opponent	Score	Result
2014	Otse Police College; Gaborone, Botswana	(Mauritius) Aurélie Allet	(Nigeria) Dorcas Ajoke Adesokan (Nigeria) Deborah Ukeh	15–21, 15–21	Silver

=== BWF International Challenge/Series ===
Women's doubles
Year	Tournament	Partner	Opponent	Score	Result
2012	Mauritius International	(Mauritius) Shama Aboobakar	(Seychelles) Allisen Camille (Seychelles) Cynthia Course	16–21, 14–21	(silver) Runner-up

BWF International Challenge tournament
BWF International Series tournament
BWF Future Series tournament
