= Augustina Ebhomien Sunday =

Nigerian badminton player (born 1996)

Personal information
- Born: 23 August 1996 (age 30)

Sport
- Country: Nigeria
- Sport: Badminton

Women's singles & doubles
- Highest ranking: 388 (WS 7 April 2016); 288 (WD 14 August 2014); 383 (XD 30 August 2018)
- BWF profile
Medal record
Women's badminton
Representing Nigeria
All-Africa Games
Bronze medal – third place	2015 Brazzaville	Mixed team
African Championships
Gold medal – first place	2019 Port Harcourt	Mixed team
Bronze medal – third place	2019 Port Harcourt	Women's doubles

Augustina Ebhomien Sunday (born 23 August 1996) is a Nigerian badminton player. She educated English and Literature at the Benson Idahosa University, and in 2015, she competed at the Summer Universiade In Gwangju, South Korea.

== Career ==
In 2013, she won the women's singles title at the Nigeria International partnering Uchechukwu Deborah Ukeh. Partnered with Dorcas Ajoke Adesokan, they finished runner-up at the 2014 Uganda International.

In 2015, she competed at the African Games and was part of the team that won the bronze medal. In 2019, she helps the Nigeria team won the African Championships, while in the women's doubles, she won the bronze medal.

== Achievements ==
=== African Championships ===
Women's doubles
Year	Venue	Partner	Opponent	Score	Result	Ref.
2019	Alfred Diete-Spiff Centre; Port Harcourt, Nigeria	(Nigeria) Peace Orji	(Nigeria) Amin Yop Christopher (Nigeria) Chineye Ibere	16–21, 14–21	Bronze	

=== BWF International Challenge/Series ===
Women's doubles
Year	Tournament	Partner	Opponent	Score	Result	Ref.
2013	Nigeria International	(Nigeria) Uchechukwu Deborah Ukeh	(Nigeria) Tosin Damilola Atolagbe (Nigeria) Fatima Azeez	21–18, 21–13	(gold) Winner	
2014	Uganda International	(Nigeria) Dorcas Ajoke Adesokan	(Nigeria) Tosin Damilola Atolagbe (Nigeria) Fatima Azeez	21–14, 9–21, 12–21	(silver) Runner-up	

BWF International Challenge tournament
BWF International Series tournament
BWF Future Series tournament
