= Moroccan Royal Gymnastics Federation =

- Sport: Gymnastics
- Abbreviation: FRMG
- Founded: 1956
- Affiliation: International Gymnastics Federation
- Affiliation date: 1976
- Headquarters: Rabat
- President: Abdessadeq Bitari

The Moroccan Royal Gymnastics Federation aims to develop, promote and supervise gymnastics in Morocco. Abdessadek Bitari is the president'.
