= Aisha Nakiyemba =

Ugandan badminton player (born 1993)

Personal information
- Born: 14 May 1993 (age 33) Mityana, Uganda

Sport
- Country: Uganda
- Sport: Badminton

Women's singles & doubles
- Highest ranking: 99 (WS 22 February 2018); 150 (WD 19 July 2018); 440 (XD 30 August 2018)
- BWF profile
Medal record
Women's badminton
Representing Uganda
African Games
Bronze medal – third place	2019 Rabat	Women's doubles
Africa Team Championships
Bronze medal – third place	2016 Rose Hill	Women's team

Aisha Nakiyemba (born 14 May 1993) is a Ugandan badminton player. She competed at the 2018 Commonwealth Games in Gold Coast. She was the women's doubles bronze medalist at the 2019 African Games partnered with Gladys Mbabazi.

Nakiyemba educated business administration at Ndejje University, and works at the Kampala club.

== Achievements ==
=== African Games ===
Women's doubles
Year	Venue	Partner	Opponent	Score	Result
2019	Ain Chock Indoor Sports Center; Casablanca, Morocco	(Uganda) Gladys Mbabazi	(Egypt) Doha Hany (Egypt) Hadia Hosny	17–21, 4–21	Bronze

=== BWF International Challenge/Series (4 runners-up) ===
Women's singles
Year	Tournament	Opponent	Score	Result
2017	Botswana International	(South Africa) Johanita Scholtz	10–21, 17–21	(silver) Runner-up

Women's doubles
Year	Tournament	Partner	Opponent	Score	Result
2018	Zambia International	(Uganda) Gladys Mbabazi	(Zambia) Ogar Siamupangila (Zambia) Evelyn Siamupangila	12–21, 19–21	(silver) Runner-up
2017	Zambia International	(Uganda) Bridget Shamim Bangi	(Italy) Silvia Garino (Italy) Lisa Iversen	17–21, 15–21	(silver) Runner-up
2015	Kampala International	(Uganda) Brenda Mugabi	(Uganda) Gloria Najjuka (Uganda) Daisy Nakalyango	17–21, 11–21	(silver) Runner-up

BWF International Challenge tournament
BWF International Series tournament
BWF Future Series tournament
