= Amin Yop Christopher =

Nigerian badminton player

Personal information
- Born: 6 December 1993 (age 32)
- Height: 1.80 m (5 ft 11 in)
- Weight: 62 kg (137 lb)

Sport
- Country: Nigeria
- Sport: Badminton

Women's singles & doubles
- Highest ranking: 309 (WS 16 July 2019); 241 (WD 17 March 2020); 383 (XD 30 August 2018)
- BWF profile
Medal record
Women's badminton
Representing Nigeria
African Games
Gold medal – first place	2019 Rabat	Mixed team
African Championships
Gold medal – first place	2019 Port Harcourt	Mixed team
Silver medal – second place	2019 Port Harcourt	Women's doubles

Amin Yop Christopher (born 6 December 1993) is a Nigerian badminton player. She has participated in major badminton events at both local and international level. She won a gold medal for the mixed team category at the 2019 Rabat African Games held in Casablanca, Morocco.

== Achievements ==
=== African Championships ===
Women's doubles
Year	Venue	Partner	Opponent	Score	Result
2019	Alfred Diete-Spiff Centre; Port Harcourt, Nigeria	(Nigeria) Chineye Ibere	(Nigeria) Dorcas Ajoke Adesokan (Nigeria) Uchechukwu Deborah Ukeh	14–21, 22–20, 17–21	Silver
