= Badminton at the 2014 African Youth Games =

Tournament details
- Dates: 22–27 May
- Edition: 1
- Venue: Otse Police College
- Location: Gaborone, Botswana

Badminton took place at the 2014 African Youth Games from 22 to 27 May 2014 in Otse Police College, Gaborone, Botswana. There are 6 events contested in this sport.

== Medal summary ==
Events	Gold	Silver	Bronze
Boys' singles	(Mauritius) Julien Paul	(Nigeria) Kingsley Nelson	(Botswana) Tumisang Olekantse
Boys' singles	(Mauritius) Julien Paul	(Nigeria) Kingsley Nelson	(Algeria) Youcef Sabri Medel
Girls' singles	(Nigeria) Dorcas Ajoke Adesokan	(South Africa) Janke van der Vyver	(Egypt) Doha Hany
Girls' singles	(Nigeria) Dorcas Ajoke Adesokan	(South Africa) Janke van der Vyver	(Mauritius) Shaama Sandooyeea
Boys' doubles	(Mauritius) Julien Paul (Mauritius) Kounal Soubbaroyan	(Algeria) Mohamed Guelmaoui (Algeria) Youcef Sabri Medel	(Botswana) Tumisang Olekantse (Botswana) Tshepo Perekisi
Boys' doubles	(Mauritius) Julien Paul (Mauritius) Kounal Soubbaroyan	(Algeria) Mohamed Guelmaoui (Algeria) Youcef Sabri Medel	(South Africa) Bremer Visser (South Africa) Bongani von Bodenstein
Girls' doubles	(Nigeria) Dorcas Ajoke Adesokan (Nigeria) Deborah Ukeh	(Mauritius) Shaama Sandooyeea (Mauritius) Aurélie Allet	(Egypt) Doha Hany (Egypt) Nouran Khaled
Girls' doubles	(Nigeria) Dorcas Ajoke Adesokan (Nigeria) Deborah Ukeh	(Mauritius) Shaama Sandooyeea (Mauritius) Aurélie Allet	(South Africa) Anri Schoones (South Africa) Janke van der Vyver
Mixed doubles	(Mauritius) Julien Paul (Mauritius) Aurélie Allet	(South Africa) Bongani von Bodenstein (South Africa) Anri Schoones	(Nigeria) Kingsley Nelson (Nigeria) Zainab Momoh
Mixed doubles	(Mauritius) Julien Paul (Mauritius) Aurélie Allet	(South Africa) Bongani von Bodenstein (South Africa) Anri Schoones	(Nigeria) Ayo Isiaq Usman (Nigeria) Deborah Ukeh
Team event	Nigeria; Muhammed Mustaopha; Kingsley Nelson; Ayo Isiaq Usman; Dorcas Ajoke Adesokan; Zainab Momoh; Deborah Ukeh	South Africa; Ruan Snyman; Bremer Visser; Bongani von Bodenstein; Graticia Roberts; Anri Schoonees; Janke van der Vyver	Mauritius; Julien Paul; Kounal Soubbaroyan; Aurélie Allet; Shaama Sandooyeea
Team event	Nigeria; Muhammed Mustaopha; Kingsley Nelson; Ayo Isiaq Usman; Dorcas Ajoke Adesokan; Zainab Momoh; Deborah Ukeh	South Africa; Ruan Snyman; Bremer Visser; Bongani von Bodenstein; Graticia Roberts; Anri Schoonees; Janke van der Vyver	Egypt; Adham Hatem Elgamal; Youssof Essam Bahnasy; Abdelhakim Hussein; Doha Hany; Nourhan Khaled; Farida Mostafa

== Medal table ==
Rank	Nation	Gold	Silver	Bronze	Total
1	Mauritius (MRI)	3	1	2	6
1	Nigeria (NGR)	3	1	2	6
3	South Africa (RSA)	0	3	2	5
4	Algeria (ALG)	0	1	1	2
5	Egypt (EGY)	0	0	3	3
6	Botswana (BOT)	0	0	2	2
Totals (6 entries)		6	6	12	24
