= 2011 BWF season =

2011 BWF Season
Details
- Duration: 5 January 2011 – 29 December 2011

Achievements (singles)

Awards
- Player of the year: (Malaysia) Lee Chong Wei (Male) (China) Wang Xiaoli & (China) Yu Yang (Female)

The 2011 BWF Season was the overall badminton circuit organized by the Badminton World Federation (BWF) for the 2011 badminton season to publish and promote the sport. Besides the BWF World Championships, BWF promotes the sport of badminton through an extensive worldwide programme of events in four structure levels. They were the individual tournaments called Super Series, Grand Prix Events, International Challenge and International Series. Besides the individual tournaments, team events such as Thomas & Uber Cup, Sudirman Cup and Suhadinata Cup are held every other year.

The 2011 BWF season calendar comprised the World Championships tournaments, the Sudirman Cup, the BWF Super Series (Superseries, Superseries Premier, Superseries Finals), the Grand Prix (Grand Prix Gold and Grand Prix), the International Series (International Series and International Challenge), and Future Series.

== Schedule ==
This is the complete schedule of events on the 2011 calendar, with the champions and runners-up documented.

Key

World Championships
Super Series Finals
Super Series Premier
Super Series
Grand Prix Gold
Grand Prix
International Challenge
International Series
Future Series
Team events

=== January ===
| Week of | Tournament | Champions | Runners-up |
|---|---|---|---|
| January 3 | Superseries Finals; Taipei, Chinese Taipei; BWF Super Series Finals $500,000 – 8MS (RR)/8WS (RR)/8MD (RR)/8WD (RR)/8XD (RR); Draw | (Malaysia) Lee Chong Wei | (Denmark) Peter Gade |
| January 3 | Superseries Finals; Taipei, Chinese Taipei; BWF Super Series Finals $500,000 – 8MS (RR)/8WS (RR)/8MD (RR)/8WD (RR)/8XD (RR); Draw | Score: 21–9, 21–14 | |
| January 3 | Superseries Finals; Taipei, Chinese Taipei; BWF Super Series Finals $500,000 – 8MS (RR)/8WS (RR)/8MD (RR)/8WD (RR)/8XD (RR); Draw | (China) Wang Shixian | (South Korea) Bae Yeon-ju |
| January 3 | Superseries Finals; Taipei, Chinese Taipei; BWF Super Series Finals $500,000 – 8MS (RR)/8WS (RR)/8MD (RR)/8WD (RR)/8XD (RR); Draw | Score: 21–13, 21–15 | |
| January 3 | Superseries Finals; Taipei, Chinese Taipei; BWF Super Series Finals $500,000 – 8MS (RR)/8WS (RR)/8MD (RR)/8WD (RR)/8XD (RR); Draw | (Denmark) Mathias Boe (Denmark) Carsten Mogensen | (South Korea) Jung Jae-sung (South Korea) Lee Yong-dae |
| January 3 | Superseries Finals; Taipei, Chinese Taipei; BWF Super Series Finals $500,000 – 8MS (RR)/8WS (RR)/8MD (RR)/8WD (RR)/8XD (RR); Draw | Score: 21–17, 21–15 | |
| January 3 | Superseries Finals; Taipei, Chinese Taipei; BWF Super Series Finals $500,000 – 8MS (RR)/8WS (RR)/8MD (RR)/8WD (RR)/8XD (RR); Draw | (China) Wang Xiaoli (China) Yu Yang | (China) Cheng Shu (China) Zhao Yunlei |
| January 3 | Superseries Finals; Taipei, Chinese Taipei; BWF Super Series Finals $500,000 – 8MS (RR)/8WS (RR)/8MD (RR)/8WD (RR)/8XD (RR); Draw | Score: 21–7, 21–17 | |
| January 3 | Superseries Finals; Taipei, Chinese Taipei; BWF Super Series Finals $500,000 – 8MS (RR)/8WS (RR)/8MD (RR)/8WD (RR)/8XD (RR); Draw | (China) Zhang Nan (China) Zhao Yunlei | (Thailand) Sudket Prapakamol (Thailand) Saralee Thungthongkam |
| January 3 | Superseries Finals; Taipei, Chinese Taipei; BWF Super Series Finals $500,000 – 8MS (RR)/8WS (RR)/8MD (RR)/8WD (RR)/8XD (RR); Draw | Score: 21–17, 21–12 | |
| January 10 | Estonian International; Tallinn, Estonia; International Series $5,000 – 32MS/32WS/32MD/32WD/32XD | (Finland) Ville Lång | (Estonia) Raul Must |
| January 10 | Estonian International; Tallinn, Estonia; International Series $5,000 – 32MS/32WS/32MD/32WD/32XD | Score: 21–15, 21–14 | |
| January 10 | Estonian International; Tallinn, Estonia; International Series $5,000 – 32MS/32WS/32MD/32WD/32XD | (New Zealand) Michelle Chan | (India) Arundhati Pantawane |
| January 10 | Estonian International; Tallinn, Estonia; International Series $5,000 – 32MS/32WS/32MD/32WD/32XD | Score: 21–16, 21–19 | |
| January 10 | Estonian International; Tallinn, Estonia; International Series $5,000 – 32MS/32WS/32MD/32WD/32XD | (Germany) Peter Käsbauer (Germany) Josche Zurwonne | (France) Lucas Corvée (France) Joris Grosjean |
| January 10 | Estonian International; Tallinn, Estonia; International Series $5,000 – 32MS/32WS/32MD/32WD/32XD | Score: 21–8, 21–18 | |
| January 10 | Estonian International; Tallinn, Estonia; International Series $5,000 – 32MS/32WS/32MD/32WD/32XD | (Netherlands) Selena Piek (Netherlands) Iris Tabeling | (Ukraine) Marija Ulitina (Ukraine) Natalya Voytsekh |
| January 10 | Estonian International; Tallinn, Estonia; International Series $5,000 – 32MS/32WS/32MD/32WD/32XD | Score: 21–12, 21–16 | |
| January 10 | Estonian International; Tallinn, Estonia; International Series $5,000 – 32MS/32WS/32MD/32WD/32XD | (Netherlands) Jacco Arends (Netherlands) Selena Piek | (Germany) Tim Dettmann (Netherlands) Ilse Vaessen |
| January 10 | Estonian International; Tallinn, Estonia; International Series $5,000 – 32MS/32WS/32MD/32WD/32XD | Score: 21–12, 21–14 | |
| January 17 | Malaysia Open; Kuala Lumpur, Malaysia; Super Series $400,000 – 32MS/32WS/32MD/32WD/32XD; Draw | (Malaysia) Lee Chong Wei | (Indonesia) Taufik Hidayat |
| January 17 | Malaysia Open; Kuala Lumpur, Malaysia; Super Series $400,000 – 32MS/32WS/32MD/32WD/32XD; Draw | Score: 21–8, 21–17 | |
| January 17 | Malaysia Open; Kuala Lumpur, Malaysia; Super Series $400,000 – 32MS/32WS/32MD/32WD/32XD; Draw | (China) Wang Shixian | (China) Wang Yihan |
| January 17 | Malaysia Open; Kuala Lumpur, Malaysia; Super Series $400,000 – 32MS/32WS/32MD/32WD/32XD; Draw | Score: 21–18, 21–14 | |
| January 17 | Malaysia Open; Kuala Lumpur, Malaysia; Super Series $400,000 – 32MS/32WS/32MD/32WD/32XD; Draw | (China) Chai Biao (China) Guo Zhendong | (Denmark) Mads Conrad-Petersen (Denmark) Jonas Rasmussen |
| January 17 | Malaysia Open; Kuala Lumpur, Malaysia; Super Series $400,000 – 32MS/32WS/32MD/32WD/32XD; Draw | Score: 21–16, 21–14 | |
| January 17 | Malaysia Open; Kuala Lumpur, Malaysia; Super Series $400,000 – 32MS/32WS/32MD/32WD/32XD; Draw | (China) Tian Qing (China) Zhao Yunlei | (China) Wang Xiaoli (China) Yu Yang |
| January 17 | Malaysia Open; Kuala Lumpur, Malaysia; Super Series $400,000 – 32MS/32WS/32MD/32WD/32XD; Draw | Score: 21–12, 6–21, 21–17 | |
| January 17 | Malaysia Open; Kuala Lumpur, Malaysia; Super Series $400,000 – 32MS/32WS/32MD/32WD/32XD; Draw | (China) He Hanbin (China) Ma Jin | (China) Tao Jiaming (China) Tian Qing |
| January 17 | Malaysia Open; Kuala Lumpur, Malaysia; Super Series $400,000 – 32MS/32WS/32MD/32WD/32XD; Draw | Score: 21–13, 13–21, 21–16 | |
| January 17 | Swedish Masters; Stockholm, Sweden; International Challenge $15,000 – 32MS/32WS/32MD/32WD/32XD | (Spain) Pablo Abián; 21-19, 21-6 | (Denmark) Viktor Axelsen |
| January 17 | Swedish Masters; Stockholm, Sweden; International Challenge $15,000 – 32MS/32WS/32MD/32WD/32XD | Score: 21–19, 21–6 | |
| January 17 | Swedish Masters; Stockholm, Sweden; International Challenge $15,000 – 32MS/32WS/32MD/32WD/32XD | (Japan) Kaori Imabeppu | (Japan) Mayu Sekiya |
| January 17 | Swedish Masters; Stockholm, Sweden; International Challenge $15,000 – 32MS/32WS/32MD/32WD/32XD | Score: 13–21, 22–20, 21–16 | |
| January 17 | Swedish Masters; Stockholm, Sweden; International Challenge $15,000 – 32MS/32WS/32MD/32WD/32XD | (Denmark) Kim Astrup (Denmark) Rasmus Fladberg | (Poland) Łukasz Moreń (Poland) Wojciech Szkudlarczyk |
| January 17 | Swedish Masters; Stockholm, Sweden; International Challenge $15,000 – 32MS/32WS/32MD/32WD/32XD | Score: 14–21, 25–23, 21–16 | |
| January 17 | Swedish Masters; Stockholm, Sweden; International Challenge $15,000 – 32MS/32WS/32MD/32WD/32XD | (Denmark) Line Damkjær Kruse (Denmark) Marie Røpke | (Japan) Rie Eto (Japan) Yu Wakita |
| January 17 | Swedish Masters; Stockholm, Sweden; International Challenge $15,000 – 32MS/32WS/32MD/32WD/32XD | Score: 21–14, 21–16 | |
| January 17 | Swedish Masters; Stockholm, Sweden; International Challenge $15,000 – 32MS/32WS/32MD/32WD/32XD | (England) Robin Middleton (England) Heather Olver | (Netherlands) Dave Khodabux (Netherlands) Samantha Barning |
| January 17 | Swedish Masters; Stockholm, Sweden; International Challenge $15,000 – 32MS/32WS/32MD/32WD/32XD | Score: 15–21, 21–9, 21–14 | |
| January 24 | Korea Open; Seoul, South Korea; Super Series Premier $1,200,000 – 32MS/32WS/32MD/32WD/32XD; Draw | (China) Lin Dan; 21-19, 14-21, 21-16 | (Malaysia) Lee Chong Wei |
| January 24 | Korea Open; Seoul, South Korea; Super Series Premier $1,200,000 – 32MS/32WS/32MD/32WD/32XD; Draw | Score: 21–19, 14–21, 21–16 | |
| January 24 | Korea Open; Seoul, South Korea; Super Series Premier $1,200,000 – 32MS/32WS/32MD/32WD/32XD; Draw | (China) Wang Yihan | (China) Wang Shixian |
| January 24 | Korea Open; Seoul, South Korea; Super Series Premier $1,200,000 – 32MS/32WS/32MD/32WD/32XD; Draw | Score: 21–14, 21–18 | |
| January 24 | Korea Open; Seoul, South Korea; Super Series Premier $1,200,000 – 32MS/32WS/32MD/32WD/32XD; Draw | (South Korea) Jung Jae-sung (South Korea) Lee Yong-dae | (Denmark) Mathias Boe (Denmark) Carsten Mogensen |
| January 24 | Korea Open; Seoul, South Korea; Super Series Premier $1,200,000 – 32MS/32WS/32MD/32WD/32XD; Draw | Score: 21–6, 21–13 | |
| January 24 | Korea Open; Seoul, South Korea; Super Series Premier $1,200,000 – 32MS/32WS/32MD/32WD/32XD; Draw | (China) Wang Xiaoli (China) Yu Yang | (China) Tian Qing (China) Zhao Yunlei |
| January 24 | Korea Open; Seoul, South Korea; Super Series Premier $1,200,000 – 32MS/32WS/32MD/32WD/32XD; Draw | Score: 21–18, 19–21, 21–4 | |
| January 24 | Korea Open; Seoul, South Korea; Super Series Premier $1,200,000 – 32MS/32WS/32MD/32WD/32XD; Draw | (China) Zhang Nan (China) Zhao Yunlei | (China) Tao Jiaming (China) Tian Qing |
| January 24 | Korea Open; Seoul, South Korea; Super Series Premier $1,200,000 – 32MS/32WS/32MD/32WD/32XD; Draw | Score: 21–17, 13–21, 21–19 | |

=== February ===
| Week of | Tournament | Champions | Runners-up |
|---|---|---|---|
February 14
| February 14 | European Mixed Team Badminton Championships; Amsterdam, Netherlands; Continental Championships; 32 Team | Denmark; 3-1 | Germany |
| February 14 | Iran Fajr International; Tehran, Iran; International Challenge $15,000 – 32MS/64WS/32MD/32WD | (Indonesia) Tommy Sugiarto; 21-17, 18-21, 21-11 | (Singapore) Derek Wong Zi Liang |
| February 14 | Iran Fajr International; Tehran, Iran; International Challenge $15,000 – 32MS/64WS/32MD/32WD | (Canada) Nicole Grether; 21-12, 24-22 | (India) Dhanya Nair |
| February 14 | Iran Fajr International; Tehran, Iran; International Challenge $15,000 – 32MS/64WS/32MD/32WD | (Malaysia) Mohd Razif Abdul Rahman (Malaysia) Mohd Razif Abdul Latif; Walkover | (Malaysia) Yeoh Kay Bin (Malaysia) Yogendran Khrishnan |
| February 14 | Iran Fajr International; Tehran, Iran; International Challenge $15,000 – 32MS/64WS/32MD/32WD | (Sri Lanka) Achini Ratnasari (Sri Lanka) Upuli Weerasinghe; 21-17, 22-20 | (Canada) Nicole Grether (Canada) Charmaine Reid |
| February 21 | Austrian International; Vienna, Austria; International Challenge $15,000 – 32MS/32WS/32MD/32WD/32XD | (Chinese Taipei) Hsu Jen-hao; 21-15, 21-12 | (Ukraine) Dmytro Zavadskyi |
| February 21 | Austrian International; Vienna, Austria; International Challenge $15,000 – 32MS/32WS/32MD/32WD/32XD | (Japan) Nozomi Okuhara; 21-6, 21-16 | (Japan) Mayu Sekiya |
| February 21 | Austrian International; Vienna, Austria; International Challenge $15,000 – 32MS/32WS/32MD/32WD/32XD | (England) Anthony Clark (England) Chris Langridge; 21-15, 21-16 | (Japan) Hiroyuki Saeki (Japan) Ryota Taohata |
| February 21 | Austrian International; Vienna, Austria; International Challenge $15,000 – 32MS/32WS/32MD/32WD/32XD | (Japan) Yuriko Miki (Japan) Koharu Yonemoto; 26-24, 21-15 | (Denmark) Line Damkjær Kruse (Denmark) Marie Røpke |
| February 21 | Austrian International; Vienna, Austria; International Challenge $15,000 – 32MS/32WS/32MD/32WD/32XD | (Hong Kong) Wong Wai Hong (Hong Kong) Chau Hoi Wah; 21-17, 21-11 | (Denmark) Mads Pieler Kolding (Denmark) Julie Houmann |

=== March ===
| Week of | Tournament | Champions | Runners-up |
|---|---|---|---|
| March 1 | German Open; Mülheim, Germany; Grand Prix Gold $120,000 – 64MS/32WS/32MD/32WD/32XD; Draw | (China) Lin Dan; 21-19, 21-11 | (China) Chen Jin |
| March 1 | German Open; Mülheim, Germany; Grand Prix Gold $120,000 – 64MS/32WS/32MD/32WD/32XD; Draw | (China) Liu Xin; 21-13, 15-21, 21-9 | (Japan) Ayane Kurihara |
| March 1 | German Open; Mülheim, Germany; Grand Prix Gold $120,000 – 64MS/32WS/32MD/32WD/32XD; Draw | (South Korea) Jung Jae-sung (South Korea) Lee Yong-dae; 21-19, 18-21, 21-11 | (South Korea) Kim Gi-jung (South Korea) Kim Sa-rang |
| March 1 | German Open; Mülheim, Germany; Grand Prix Gold $120,000 – 64MS/32WS/32MD/32WD/32XD; Draw | (Japan) Mizuki Fujii (Japan) Reika Kakiiwa; 21-6, 21-14 | (South Korea) Ha Jung-eun (South Korea) Kim Min-jung |
| March 1 | German Open; Mülheim, Germany; Grand Prix Gold $120,000 – 64MS/32WS/32MD/32WD/32XD; Draw | (Scotland) Robert Blair (England) Gabrielle White; 16-21, 21-16, 21-15 | (Japan) Shintaro Ikeda (Japan) Reiko Shiota |
| March 7 | All England Open; Birmingham, England; Super Series Premier $350,000 – 32MS/32WS/32MD/32WD/32XD; Draw | (Malaysia) Lee Chong Wei; 21-17, 21-17 | (China) Lin Dan |
| March 7 | All England Open; Birmingham, England; Super Series Premier $350,000 – 32MS/32WS/32MD/32WD/32XD; Draw | (China) Wang Shixian; 24-22, 21-18 | (Japan) Eriko Hirose |
| March 7 | All England Open; Birmingham, England; Super Series Premier $350,000 – 32MS/32WS/32MD/32WD/32XD; Draw | (Denmark) Mathias Boe (Denmark) Carsten Mogensen; 15-21, 21-18, 21-18 | (Malaysia) Koo Kien Keat (Malaysia) Tan Boon Heong |
| March 7 | All England Open; Birmingham, England; Super Series Premier $350,000 – 32MS/32WS/32MD/32WD/32XD; Draw | (China) Wang Xiaoli (China) Yu Yang; 21-2, 21-9 | (Japan) Mizuki Fujii (Japan) Reika Kakiiwa |
| March 7 | All England Open; Birmingham, England; Super Series Premier $350,000 – 32MS/32WS/32MD/32WD/32XD; Draw | (China) Xu Chen (China) Ma Jin; 21-13, 21-9 | (Thailand) Sudket Prapakamol (Thailand) Saralee Thungthongkam |
| March 14 | Swiss Open; Basel, Switzerland; Grand Prix Gold $125,000 – 64MS/32WS/32MD/32WD/32XD; Draw | (South Korea) Park Sung-hwan; 17-21, 21-9, 21-17 | (South Korea) Lee Hyun-il |
| March 14 | Swiss Open; Basel, Switzerland; Grand Prix Gold $125,000 – 64MS/32WS/32MD/32WD/32XD; Draw | (India) Saina Nehwal; 21-13, 21-14 | (South Korea) Sung Ji-hyun |
| March 14 | Swiss Open; Basel, Switzerland; Grand Prix Gold $125,000 – 64MS/32WS/32MD/32WD/32XD; Draw | (South Korea) Ko Sung-hyun (South Korea) Yoo Yeon-seong; 21-17, 21-16 | (South Korea) Jung Jae-sung (South Korea) Lee Yong-dae |
| March 14 | Swiss Open; Basel, Switzerland; Grand Prix Gold $125,000 – 64MS/32WS/32MD/32WD/32XD; Draw | (South Korea) Ha Jung-eun (South Korea) Kim Min-jung; 21-12, 21-13 | (South Korea) Jung Kyung-eun (South Korea) Kim Ha-na |
| March 14 | Swiss Open; Basel, Switzerland; Grand Prix Gold $125,000 – 64MS/32WS/32MD/32WD/32XD; Draw | (Denmark) Joachim Fischer Nielsen (Denmark) Christinna Pedersen; 23-21, 21-14 | (England) Nathan Robertson (England) Jenny Wallwork |
| March 14 | Banuinvest International; Timișoara, Romania; International Series $5,000 – 32MS/32WS/16MD/8WD/16XD | (Japan) Koichi Saeki; 21-13, 21-16 | (Denmark) Rasmus Fladberg |
| March 14 | Banuinvest International; Timișoara, Romania; International Series $5,000 – 32MS/32WS/16MD/8WD/16XD | (Japan) Minatsu Mitani; 21-14, 21-16 | (Japan) Yui Hashimoto |
| March 14 | Banuinvest International; Timișoara, Romania; International Series $5,000 – 32MS/32WS/16MD/8WD/16XD | (Republic of Ireland) Sam Magee (Republic of Ireland) Tony Stephenson; 21-13, 21-14 | (Ukraine) Mykola Dmytryshyn (Ukraine) Vitalyi Konov |
| March 14 | Banuinvest International; Timișoara, Romania; International Series $5,000 – 32MS/32WS/16MD/8WD/16XD | (Canada) Alex Bruce (Canada) Michelle Li; 21-15, 21-14 | (Romania) Sonia Olariu (Romania) Florentina Petre |
| March 14 | Banuinvest International; Timișoara, Romania; International Series $5,000 – 32MS/32WS/16MD/8WD/16XD | (Republic of Ireland) Sam Magee (Republic of Ireland) Chloe Magee; 21-12, 18-21, 21-18 | (Austria) Roman Zirnwald (Austria) Elisabeth Baldauf |
| March 14 | Uganda International; Kampala, Uganda; International Series $5,000 – 64MS/32WS/16MD/16WD/16XD | (Czech Republic) Jan Fröhlich; 21-15, 12-1 Retired | (Iran) Kaveh Mehrabi |
| March 14 | Uganda International; Kampala, Uganda; International Series $5,000 – 64MS/32WS/16MD/16WD/16XD | (Portugal) Telma Santos; 21-19, 19-21, 21-19 | (Turkey) Özge Bayrak |
| March 14 | Uganda International; Kampala, Uganda; International Series $5,000 – 64MS/32WS/16MD/16WD/16XD | (Italy) Giovanni Greco (Italy) Daniel Messersi; 21-14, 21-17 | (Uganda) Ivan Mayega (Uganda) Wilson Tukire |
| March 14 | Uganda International; Kampala, Uganda; International Series $5,000 – 64MS/32WS/16MD/16WD/16XD | (Turkey) Özge Bayrak (Turkey) Öznur Çalışkan; 21-14, 12-21, 21-14 | (India) Dhanya Nair (India) Mohita Sahdev |
| March 14 | Uganda International; Kampala, Uganda; International Series $5,000 – 64MS/32WS/16MD/16WD/16XD | (Uganda) Ivan Mayega (Uganda) Norah Nassimbwa; 12-21, 21-15, 21-12 | (Uganda) Benfield Mulumba (Uganda) Rose Nakalya |
| March 21 | Polish Open; Białystok, Poland; International Challenge $15,000 – 32MS/32WS/32MD/32WD/32XD | (Spain) Pablo Abián; 21-14, 21-12 | (Russia) Vladimir Ivanov |
| March 21 | Polish Open; Białystok, Poland; International Challenge $15,000 – 32MS/32WS/32MD/32WD/32XD | (Ukraine) Larisa Griga; 21-15, 21-16 | (Japan) Yuka Kusunose |
| March 21 | Polish Open; Białystok, Poland; International Challenge $15,000 – 32MS/32WS/32MD/32WD/32XD | (Russia) Vladimir Ivanov (Russia) Ivan Sozonov; 23-21, 21-17 | (Poland) Adam Cwalina (Poland) Michał Łogosz |
| March 21 | Polish Open; Białystok, Poland; International Challenge $15,000 – 32MS/32WS/32MD/32WD/32XD | (Japan) Rie Eto (Japan) Yu Wakita; 21-16, 21-9 | (Japan) Kana Ito (Japan) Asumi Kugo |
| March 21 | Polish Open; Białystok, Poland; International Challenge $15,000 – 32MS/32WS/32MD/32WD/32XD | (Poland) Robert Mateusiak (Poland) Nadieżda Zięba; 21-13, 21-17 | (Poland) Rafał Hawel (Poland) Kamila Augustyn |
| March 21 | Giraldilla International; La Habana, Cuba; Future Series; 64MS/64WS/32MD/16WD/32XD | (Indonesia) Arief Gifar Ramadhan; 21-19, 21-17 | (Cuba) Osleni Guerrero |
| March 21 | Giraldilla International; La Habana, Cuba; Future Series; 64MS/64WS/32MD/16WD/32XD | (Indonesia) Putri Muthia Restu; 21-8, 21-11 | (Cuba) María de Lucia Hernández |
| March 21 | Giraldilla International; La Habana, Cuba; Future Series; 64MS/64WS/32MD/16WD/32XD | (Indonesia) Berry Angriawan (Indonesia) Christopher Rusdianto; 21-10, 21-12 | (Brazil) Luíz dos Santos Jr. (Brazil) Alex Tjong |
| March 21 | Giraldilla International; La Habana, Cuba; Future Series; 64MS/64WS/32MD/16WD/32XD | (Indonesia) Dwi Agustiawati (Indonesia) Ayu Rahmasari; 21-14, 21-6 | (Mexico) Cynthia González (Mexico) Victoria Montero |
| March 21 | Giraldilla International; La Habana, Cuba; Future Series; 64MS/64WS/32MD/16WD/32XD | (Indonesia) Christopher Rusdianto (Indonesia) Dwi Agustiawati; 17-21, 21-14, 21-12 | (Indonesia) Berry Angriawan (Indonesia) Ayu Rahmasari |
| March 28 | Vietnam International; Hanoi, Vietnam; International Challenge $15,000 – 64MS/32WS/32MD/32WD/32XD | (South Korea) Lee Dong-keun; 18-21, 21-17, 21-19 | (Singapore) Ashton Chen |
| March 28 | Vietnam International; Hanoi, Vietnam; International Challenge $15,000 – 64MS/32WS/32MD/32WD/32XD | (Malaysia) Tee Jing Yi; 21-19, 21-15 | (Thailand) Sapsiree Taerattanachai |
| March 28 | Vietnam International; Hanoi, Vietnam; International Challenge $15,000 – 64MS/32WS/32MD/32WD/32XD | (Indonesia) Fernando Kurniawan (Indonesia) Wifqi Windarto; 21-19, 14-21, 21-13 | (Thailand) Patiphat Chalardchaleam (Thailand) Nipitphon Phuangphuapet |
| March 28 | Vietnam International; Hanoi, Vietnam; International Challenge $15,000 – 64MS/32WS/32MD/32WD/32XD | (South Korea) Choi Hye-in (South Korea) Lee Se-rang; 15-21, 21-10, 21-13 | (Indonesia) Komala Dewi (Indonesia) Jenna Gozali |
| March 28 | Vietnam International; Hanoi, Vietnam; International Challenge $15,000 – 64MS/32WS/32MD/32WD/32XD | (Thailand) Patiphat Chalardchaleam (Thailand) Savitree Amitrapai; 21-19, 20-22, 23-21 | (South Korea) Kang Ji-wook (South Korea) Choi Hye-in |
| March 28 | New Zealand International; Auckland, New Zealand; International Challenge $15,000 – 64MS/32WS/32MD/16WD/32XD | (Japan) Riichi Takeshita; 21-19, 21-19 | (Hong Kong) Wong Wing Ki |
| March 28 | New Zealand International; Auckland, New Zealand; International Challenge $15,000 – 64MS/32WS/32MD/16WD/32XD | (Japan) Sayaka Sato; 21-14, 21-13 | (Singapore) Gu Juan |
| March 28 | New Zealand International; Auckland, New Zealand; International Challenge $15,000 – 64MS/32WS/32MD/16WD/32XD | (Singapore) Danny Bawa Chrisnanta (Singapore) Hendra Wijaya; 21-15, 21-17 | (Chinese Taipei) Huang Po-yi (Chinese Taipei) Lu Chia-pin |
| March 28 | New Zealand International; Auckland, New Zealand; International Challenge $15,000 – 64MS/32WS/32MD/16WD/32XD | (Japan) Yuriko Miki (Japan) Koharu Yonemoto; 16-21, 21-16, 22-20 | (Hong Kong) Poon Lok Yan (Hong Kong) Tse Ying Suet |
| March 28 | New Zealand International; Auckland, New Zealand; International Challenge $15,000 – 64MS/32WS/32MD/16WD/32XD | (Singapore) Danny Bawa Chrisnanta (Singapore) Vanessa Neo; 21-14, 21-13 | (Japan) Takeshi Kamura (Japan) Koharu Yonemoto |
| March 28 | Croatian International; Zagreb, Croatia; International Series $5,000 – 32MS/32WS/32MD/32WD/32XD | (Germany) Dieter Domke; 21-16, 21-7 | (Estonia) Raul Must |
| March 28 | Croatian International; Zagreb, Croatia; International Series $5,000 – 32MS/32WS/32MD/32WD/32XD | (Japan) Minatsu Mitani; 21–14, 21–17 | (France) Perrine Le Buhanic |
| March 28 | Croatian International; Zagreb, Croatia; International Series $5,000 – 32MS/32WS/32MD/32WD/32XD | (Denmark) Kim Astrup (Denmark) Rasmus Fladberg; 18-21, 21-19, 21-16 | (Denmark) Niclas Nøhr (Denmark) Mads Pedersen |
| March 28 | Croatian International; Zagreb, Croatia; International Series $5,000 – 32MS/32WS/32MD/32WD/32XD | (Denmark) Sandra-Maria Jensen (Denmark) Line Kjærsfeldt; 21-14, 21-18 | (Poland) Natalia Pocztowiak (Croatia) Staša Poznanović |
| March 28 | Croatian International; Zagreb, Croatia; International Series $5,000 – 32MS/32WS/32MD/32WD/32XD | (Croatia) Zvonimir Đurkinjak (Croatia) Staša Poznanović; 21-13, 21-13 | (Denmark) Kim Astrup (Denmark) Line Kjærsfeldt |

=== April ===
| Week of | Tournament | Champions | Runners-up |
|---|---|---|---|
| April 4 | Australian Open; Melbourne, Australia; Grand Prix Gold $120,000 – 64MS/32WS/32MD/32WD/32XD; Draw | (Japan) Sho Sasaki; 21-11, 12-21, 21-19 | (Malaysia) Wong Choong Hann |
| April 4 | Australian Open; Melbourne, Australia; Grand Prix Gold $120,000 – 64MS/32WS/32MD/32WD/32XD; Draw | (China) Liu Xin; 21-14, 21-9 | (Thailand) Porntip Buranaprasertsuk |
| April 4 | Australian Open; Melbourne, Australia; Grand Prix Gold $120,000 – 64MS/32WS/32MD/32WD/32XD; Draw | (Japan) Hiroyuki Endo (Japan) Kenichi Hayakawa; 21-17, 21-18 | (Japan) Naoki Kawamae (Japan) Shoji Sato |
| April 4 | Australian Open; Melbourne, Australia; Grand Prix Gold $120,000 – 64MS/32WS/32MD/32WD/32XD; Draw | (Japan) Shizuka Matsuo (Japan) Mami Naito; 21-18, 21-11 | (Malaysia) Chin Eei Hui (Malaysia) Wong Pei Tty |
| April 4 | Australian Open; Melbourne, Australia; Grand Prix Gold $120,000 – 64MS/32WS/32MD/32WD/32XD; Draw | (Thailand) Songphon Anugritayawon (Thailand) Kunchala Voravichitchaikul; 21-15, 21-9 | (Japan) Hirokatsu Hashimoto (Japan) Mizuki Fujii |
| April 4 | Osaka International; Osaka, Japan; International Challenge $15,000 – 32MS/32WS/32MD/32WD/16XD | (Japan) Keigo Sonoda; 18-21, 21-16, 21-16 | (Japan) Sho Zeniya |
| April 4 | Osaka International; Osaka, Japan; International Challenge $15,000 – 32MS/32WS/32MD/32WD/16XD | (Japan) Minatsu Mitani; 21-10, 21-10 | (Japan) Megumi Taruno |
| April 4 | Osaka International; Osaka, Japan; International Challenge $15,000 – 32MS/32WS/32MD/32WD/16XD | (Japan) Takatoshi Kurose (Japan) Keigo Sonoda; 21-14, 21-14 | (Japan) Shu Wada (Japan) Tatsuya Watanabe |
| April 4 | Osaka International; Osaka, Japan; International Challenge $15,000 – 32MS/32WS/32MD/32WD/16XD | (Japan) Miri Ichimaru (Japan) Shiho Tanaka; 19-21, 21-18, 21-14 | (Japan) Yuriko Miki (Japan) Koharu Yonemoto |
| April 4 | Osaka International; Osaka, Japan; International Challenge $15,000 – 32MS/32WS/32MD/32WD/16XD | (Japan) Takeshi Kamura (Japan) Koharu Yonemoto; 21-18, 21-7 | (Japan) Keisuke Kawaguchi (Japan) Shinobu Ogura |
| April 11 | Peru International; Lima, Peru; International Challenge $15,000 – 32MS/32WS/32MD/32WD/32XD | (Guatemala) Kevin Cordón; 23-21, 6-21, 21-12 | (Austria) Michael Lahnsteiner |
| April 11 | Peru International; Lima, Peru; International Challenge $15,000 – 32MS/32WS/32MD/32WD/32XD | (United States) Rena Wang; 21-19, 20-22, 17-9 Retired | (Canada) Nicole Grether |
| April 11 | Peru International; Lima, Peru; International Challenge $15,000 – 32MS/32WS/32MD/32WD/32XD | (United States) Howard Bach (United States) Tony Gunawan; 21-10, 21-9 | (Canada) Adrian Liu (Canada) Derrick Ng |
| April 11 | Peru International; Lima, Peru; International Challenge $15,000 – 32MS/32WS/32MD/32WD/32XD | (Canada) Alex Bruce (Canada) Michelle Li; 11-21, 21-15, 21-8 | (United States) Iris Wang (United States) Rena Wang |
| April 11 | Peru International; Lima, Peru; International Challenge $15,000 – 32MS/32WS/32MD/32WD/32XD | (Canada) Toby Ng (Canada) Grace Gao; 21-11, 14-21, 21-15 | (United States) Halim Haryanto (United States) Eva Lee |
| April 18 | Badminton Asia Championships; Chengdu, Sichuan, China; Continental Championships $150,000 – 64MS/32WS/32MD/32WD/32XD; Draw | (China) Lin Dan; 21–19, 21–13 | (China) Bao Chunlai |
| April 18 | Badminton Asia Championships; Chengdu, Sichuan, China; Continental Championships $150,000 – 64MS/32WS/32MD/32WD/32XD; Draw | (China) Wang Yihan; 21-15, 23-21 | (China) Lu Lan |
| April 18 | Badminton Asia Championships; Chengdu, Sichuan, China; Continental Championships $150,000 – 64MS/32WS/32MD/32WD/32XD; Draw | (China) Cai Yun (China) Fu Haifeng; 21-12, 21-15 | (Japan) Hirokatsu Hashimoto (Japan) Noriyasu Hirata |
| April 18 | Badminton Asia Championships; Chengdu, Sichuan, China; Continental Championships $150,000 – 64MS/32WS/32MD/32WD/32XD; Draw | (China) Wang Xiaoli (China) Yu Yang; 21-13, 21-10 | (China) Tian Qing (China) Zhao Yunlei |
| April 18 | Badminton Asia Championships; Chengdu, Sichuan, China; Continental Championships $150,000 – 64MS/32WS/32MD/32WD/32XD; Draw | (China) Zhang Nan (China) Zhao Yunlei; 15-21, 21-15, 25-23 | (China) Xu Chen (China) Ma Jin |
| April 18 | Dutch International; Wateringen, Netherland; International Challenge $15,000 – 32MS/32WS/32MD/32WD/32XD | (Denmark) Hans-Kristian Vittinghus; 18-21, 21-15, 21-4 | (Finland) Ville Lång |
| April 18 | Dutch International; Wateringen, Netherland; International Challenge $15,000 – 32MS/32WS/32MD/32WD/32XD | (Scotland) Susan Egelstaff; 21-18, 13-21, 21-15 | (Canada) Michelle Li |
| April 18 | Dutch International; Wateringen, Netherland; International Challenge $15,000 – 32MS/32WS/32MD/32WD/32XD | (France) Baptiste Carême (France) Sylvain Grosjean; 21-11, 19-21, 21-17-9 | (Germany) Peter Käsbauer (Germany) Josche Zurwonne |
| April 18 | Dutch International; Wateringen, Netherland; International Challenge $15,000 – 32MS/32WS/32MD/32WD/32XD | (Russia) Valeria Sorokina (Russia) Nina Vislova; 24-22, 21-12 | (Netherlands) Paulien van Dooremalen (Netherlands) Lotte Jonathans |
| April 18 | Dutch International; Wateringen, Netherland; International Challenge $15,000 – 32MS/32WS/32MD/32WD/32XD | (Russia) Aleksandr Nikolaenko (Russia) Valeria Sorokina; 13-21, 12-11 Retired | (Denmark) Mikkel Delbo Larsen (Denmark) Mie Schjøtt-Kristensen |
| April 25 | India Open; New Delhi, India; Super Series $200,000 – 32MS/32WS/32MD/32WD/32XD; Draw | (Malaysia) Lee Chong Wei; 21-12, 12-21, 21-15 | (Denmark) Peter Gade |
| April 25 | India Open; New Delhi, India; Super Series $200,000 – 32MS/32WS/32MD/32WD/32XD; Draw | (Thailand) Porntip Buranaprasertsuk; 21-13, 21-16 | (South Korea) Bae Yeon-ju |
| April 25 | India Open; New Delhi, India; Super Series $200,000 – 32MS/32WS/32MD/32WD/32XD; Draw | (Japan) Hirokatsu Hashimoto (Japan) Noriyasu Hirata; 21-17, 21-9 | (Indonesia) Angga Pratama (Indonesia) Rian Agung Saputro |
| April 25 | India Open; New Delhi, India; Super Series $200,000 – 32MS/32WS/32MD/32WD/32XD; Draw | (Japan) Miyuki Maeda (Japan) Satoko Suetsuna; 26-24, 21-15 | (Japan) Mizuki Fujii (Japan) Reika Kakiiwa |
| April 25 | India Open; New Delhi, India; Super Series $200,000 – 32MS/32WS/32MD/32WD/32XD; Draw | (Indonesia) Tontowi Ahmad (Indonesia) Liliyana Natsir; 21-18, 23-21 | (Indonesia) Fran Kurniawan (Indonesia) Pia Zebadiah Bernadet |
| April 25 | Smiling Fish International; Trang, Thailand; International Series $5,000 – 128MS/64WS/64MD/32WD/32XD | (Singapore) Ashton Chen Yong Zhao; 21-17, 21-19 | (Thailand) Parinyawat Thongnuam |
| April 25 | Smiling Fish International; Trang, Thailand; International Series $5,000 – 128MS/64WS/64MD/32WD/32XD | (Japan) Yuka Kusunose; 21-14, 21-9 | (Japan) Emi Moue |
| April 25 | Smiling Fish International; Trang, Thailand; International Series $5,000 – 128MS/64WS/64MD/32WD/32XD | (Malaysia) Nelson Heg (Malaysia) Teo Ee Yi; 15-21, 21-19, 21-16 | (Indonesia) Hendra Setyo Nugrorho (Indonesia) Trikusuma Wardhana |
| April 25 | Smiling Fish International; Trang, Thailand; International Series $5,000 – 128MS/64WS/64MD/32WD/32XD | (Thailand) Chayanit Chaladchalam (Thailand) Pattharaporn Jindapol; 21-16, 21-18 | (Thailand) Narissapat Lam (Thailand) Maetanee Phattanaphitoon |
| April 25 | Smiling Fish International; Trang, Thailand; International Series $5,000 – 128MS/64WS/64MD/32WD/32XD | (Malaysia) Tan Aik Quan (Malaysia) Lai Pei Jing; 19-21, 22-20, 21-11 | (Indonesia) Andhika Anhar (Indonesia) Kesya Nurvita Hanadia |
| April 25 | Portugal International; Caldas da Rainha, Portugal; International Series $5,000 – 32MS/32WS/32MD/32WD/32XD | (Germany) Sven-Eric Kastens; 15-21, 21-18, 21-11 | (Germany) Lukas Schmidt |
| April 25 | Portugal International; Caldas da Rainha, Portugal; International Series $5,000 – 32MS/32WS/32MD/32WD/32XD | (France) Sashina Vignes Waran; 21-11, 21-15 | (France) Atu Rosalina |
| April 25 | Portugal International; Caldas da Rainha, Portugal; International Series $5,000 – 32MS/32WS/32MD/32WD/32XD | (Denmark) Niclas Nøhr (Denmark) Mads Pedersen; 28-26, 16-21, 21-17 | (Denmark) Mats Bue (Denmark) Anders Skaarup Rasmussen |
| April 25 | Portugal International; Caldas da Rainha, Portugal; International Series $5,000 – 32MS/32WS/32MD/32WD/32XD | (England) Alexandra Langley (England) Lauren Smith; 14-21, 21-14, 21-17 | (England) Helen Davies (England) Alyssa Lim |
| April 25 | Portugal International; Caldas da Rainha, Portugal; International Series $5,000 – 32MS/32WS/32MD/32WD/32XD | (England) Robin Middleton (England) Alexandra Langley; 25-23, 21-19 | (England) Ben Stawski (England) Lauren Smith |

=== May ===
| Week of | Tournament | Champions | Runners-up |
|---|---|---|---|
| May 2 | Malaysia Masters; Alor Setar, Malaysia; Grand Prix Gold $120,000 – 64MS/32WS/32MD/32WD/32XD; Draw | (Malaysia) Lee Chong Wei; 21-9, 21-19 | (China) Bao Chunlai |
| May 2 | Malaysia Masters; Alor Setar, Malaysia; Grand Prix Gold $120,000 – 64MS/32WS/32MD/32WD/32XD; Draw | (China) Wang Xin; 13-21, 21-8, 21-14 | (India) Saina Nehwal |
| May 2 | Malaysia Masters; Alor Setar, Malaysia; Grand Prix Gold $120,000 – 64MS/32WS/32MD/32WD/32XD; Draw | (Malaysia) Koo Kien Keat (Malaysia) Tan Boon Heong; 21-16, 21-7 | (Indonesia) Hendra Aprida Gunawan (Indonesia) Alvent Yulianto |
| May 2 | Malaysia Masters; Alor Setar, Malaysia; Grand Prix Gold $120,000 – 64MS/32WS/32MD/32WD/32XD; Draw | (Japan) Miyuki Maeda (Japan) Satoko Suetsuna; 21-18, 21-13 | (Japan) Shizuka Matsuo (Japan) Mami Naito |
| May 2 | Malaysia Masters; Alor Setar, Malaysia; Grand Prix Gold $120,000 – 64MS/32WS/32MD/32WD/32XD; Draw | (Indonesia) Tontowi Ahmad (Indonesia) Liliyana Natsir; 18-21, 21-15, 21-19 | (Malaysia) Chan Peng Soon (Malaysia) Goh Liu Ying |
| May 2 | Denmark International; Frederikshavn, Denmark; International Challenge $15,000 – 64MS/32WS/32MD/32WD/32XD | (Denmark) Jan Ø. Jørgensen; 21-15, 21-12 | (Denmark) Hans-Kristian Vittinghus |
| May 2 | Denmark International; Frederikshavn, Denmark; International Challenge $15,000 – 64MS/32WS/32MD/32WD/32XD | (Russia) Anastasia Prokopenko; 21–15, 21–15 | (Italy) Agnese Allegrini |
| May 2 | Denmark International; Frederikshavn, Denmark; International Challenge $15,000 – 64MS/32WS/32MD/32WD/32XD | (Denmark) Rasmus Bonde (Denmark) Anders Kristiansen; 21-14, 19-21, 21-16 | (Denmark) Mikkel Elbjørn Larsen (Denmark) Christian Skovgaard |
| May 2 | Denmark International; Frederikshavn, Denmark; International Challenge $15,000 – 64MS/32WS/32MD/32WD/32XD | (Denmark) Line Damkjær Kruse (Denmark) Marie Røpke; 21-14, 21-14 | (Denmark) Maria Helsbøl (Denmark) Anne Skelbæk |
| May 2 | Denmark International; Frederikshavn, Denmark; International Challenge $15,000 – 64MS/32WS/32MD/32WD/32XD | (Denmark) Mads Pieler Kolding (Denmark) Julie Houmann; 21–13, 21–15 | (Denmark) Rasmus Bonde (Denmark) Maria Helsbøl |
| May 2 | African Badminton Championships; Marrakesh, Morocco; Continental Championships 9T/64MS/32WS/16MD/16WD/32XD; Draw | South Africa; 3–2 | Nigeria |
| May 2 | African Badminton Championships; Marrakesh, Morocco; Continental Championships 9T/64MS/32WS/16MD/16WD/32XD; Draw | (Nigeria) Jinkan Ifraimu; 16-21, 21-19, 21-18 | (Nigeria) Ola Fagbemi |
| May 2 | African Badminton Championships; Marrakesh, Morocco; Continental Championships 9T/64MS/32WS/16MD/16WD/32XD; Draw | (South Africa) Stacey Doubel; 21-18, 21-16 | (South Africa) Kerry-Lee Harrington |
| May 2 | African Badminton Championships; Marrakesh, Morocco; Continental Championships 9T/64MS/32WS/16MD/16WD/32XD; Draw | (South Africa) Dorian James (South Africa) Willem Viljoen; 21-18, 21-14 | (Nigeria) Ola Fagbemi (Nigeria) Jinkan Ifraimu |
| May 2 | African Badminton Championships; Marrakesh, Morocco; Continental Championships 9T/64MS/32WS/16MD/16WD/32XD; Draw | (South Africa) Michelle Edwards (South Africa) Annari Viljoen; 21-9, 21-16 | (Nigeria) Maria Braimoh (Nigeria) Susan Ideh |
| May 2 | African Badminton Championships; Marrakesh, Morocco; Continental Championships 9T/64MS/32WS/16MD/16WD/32XD; Draw | (South Africa) Willem Viljoen (South Africa) Annari Viljoen; 21–13, 21–12 | (South Africa) Dorian James (South Africa) Michelle Edwards |
| May 2 | Fiji International; Suva, Fiji; Future Series; 32MS/16WS/16MD/8WD/16XD | (Australia) Wesley Caulkett; 13-21, 21-14, 21-16 | (Iran) Kaveh Mehrabi |
| May 2 | Fiji International; Suva, Fiji; Future Series; 32MS/16WS/16MD/8WD/16XD | (Fiji) Andra Whiteside; 21-7, 21-18 | (New Caledonia) Johanna Kou |
| May 2 | Fiji International; Suva, Fiji; Future Series; 32MS/16WS/16MD/8WD/16XD | (Australia) Wesley Caulkett (Australia) Raymond Tam; 21-8, 21-13 | (Australia) Michael Fariman (Australia) Pit Seng Low |
| May 2 | Fiji International; Suva, Fiji; Future Series; 32MS/16WS/16MD/8WD/16XD | (New Caledonia) Cecile Kaddour (New Caledonia) Johanna Kou; 21-19, 21-10 | (Fiji) Andra Whiteside (Fiji) Danielle Whiteside |
| May 2 | Fiji International; Suva, Fiji; Future Series; 32MS/16WS/16MD/8WD/16XD | (Australia) Brent Munday (New Zealand) Ashleigh Karl; 21-17, 21-16 | (New Caledonia) Arnaud Franzi (New Caledonia) Johanna Kou |
| May 9 | Slovenia International; Medvode, Slovenia; International Series $5,000 – 64MS/32WS/32MD/16WD/32XD | (Chinese Taipei) Hsu Jen-hao; 21-14, 19-21, 21-10 | (Guatemala) Kevin Cordón |
| May 9 | Slovenia International; Medvode, Slovenia; International Series $5,000 – 64MS/32WS/32MD/16WD/32XD | (Germany) Carola Bott; 21–13, 21–10 | (Finland) Nanna Vainio |
| May 9 | Slovenia International; Medvode, Slovenia; International Series $5,000 – 64MS/32WS/32MD/16WD/32XD | (Poland) Łukasz Moreń (Poland) Wojciech Szkudlarczyk; 21-13, 21-14 | (Austria) Jürgen Koch (Austria) Peter Zauner |
| May 9 | Slovenia International; Medvode, Slovenia; International Series $5,000 – 64MS/32WS/32MD/16WD/32XD | (Germany) Johanna Goliszewski (Germany) Carla Nelte; 21-14, 21-18 | (Finland) Airi Mikkelä (Finland) Jenny Nyström |
| May 9 | Slovenia International; Medvode, Slovenia; International Series $5,000 – 64MS/32WS/32MD/16WD/32XD | (Croatia) Zvonimir Đurkinjak (Croatia) Staša Poznanović; 21–15, 21–11 | (Poland) Wojciech Szkudlarczyk (Poland) Agnieszka Wojtkowska |
| May 9 | Morocco International; Marrakesh, Morocco; International Challenge $15,000 – 64MS/64WS/32MD/32WD/64XD | (Spain) Pablo Abián; 21-19, 17-21, 21-19 | (Denmark) Joachim Persson |
| May 9 | Morocco International; Marrakesh, Morocco; International Challenge $15,000 – 64MS/64WS/32MD/32WD/64XD | (Spain) Carolina Marín; 21-17, 21-13 | (Germany) Juliane Schenk |
| May 9 | Morocco International; Marrakesh, Morocco; International Challenge $15,000 – 64MS/64WS/32MD/32WD/64XD | (Germany) Ingo Kindervater (Germany) Johannes Schöttler; 21-15, 21-19 | (Germany) Michael Fuchs (Germany) Oliver Roth |
| May 9 | Morocco International; Marrakesh, Morocco; International Challenge $15,000 – 64MS/64WS/32MD/32WD/64XD | (Germany) Birgit Michels (Germany) Sandra Marinello; 21-16, 21-16 | (Sweden) Emelie Lennartsson (Sweden) Emma Wengberg |
| May 9 | Morocco International; Marrakesh, Morocco; International Challenge $15,000 – 64MS/64WS/32MD/32WD/64XD | (Germany) Michael Fuchs (Germany) Birgit Michels; 21-15, 21-16 | (Canada) Toby Ng (Canada) Grace Gao |
| May 16 | Spanish Open; Madrid, Spain; International Challenge $15,000 – 32MS/32WS/32MD/32WD/32XD | (Denmark) Viktor Axelsen; 21-11, 7-21, 21-9 | (Spain) Pablo Abián |
| May 16 | Spanish Open; Madrid, Spain; International Challenge $15,000 – 32MS/32WS/32MD/32WD/32XD | (Spain) Carolina Marín; 21-13, 21-14 | (Germany) Olga Konon |
| May 16 | Spanish Open; Madrid, Spain; International Challenge $15,000 – 32MS/32WS/32MD/32WD/32XD | (Poland) Adam Cwalina (Poland) Michał Łogosz; 21-14, 21-11 | (Germany) Peter Käsbauer (Germany) Josche Zurwonne |
| May 16 | Spanish Open; Madrid, Spain; International Challenge $15,000 – 32MS/32WS/32MD/32WD/32XD | (Netherlands) Lotte Jonathans (Netherlands) Paulien van Dooremalen; 12-21, 21-18, 21-14 | (Canada) Nicole Grether (Canada) Charmaine Reid |
| May 16 | Spanish Open; Madrid, Spain; International Challenge $15,000 – 32MS/32WS/32MD/32WD/32XD | (Denmark) Mikkel Delbo Larsen (Denmark) Mie Schjøtt-Kristensen; 21–17, 21-19 | (Croatia) Zvonimir Đurkinjak (Croatia) Staša Poznanović |
| May 23 | Sudirman Cup; Qingdao, China; BWF Mixed Team Championships; Draw | China; 3–1 | Denmark |

=== June ===
| Week of | Tournament | Champions | Runners-up |
|---|---|---|---|
| June 6 | Maldives International; Malé, Maldives; International Challenge $15,000 – 64MS/64WS/32MD/16WD/16XD | (Spain) Pablo Abián; 21-15, 21-16 | (India) Chetan Anand |
| June 6 | Maldives International; Malé, Maldives; International Challenge $15,000 – 64MS/64WS/32MD/16WD/16XD | (India) P. V. Sindhu; 21-11 21-16 | (India) P. C. Thulasi |
| June 6 | Maldives International; Malé, Maldives; International Challenge $15,000 – 64MS/64WS/32MD/16WD/16XD | (Singapore) Ashton Chen Yong Zhao (Singapore) Derek Wong Zi Liang; 21-19, 21-17 | (Austria) Jurgen Koch (Austria) Peter Zauner |
| June 6 | Maldives International; Malé, Maldives; International Challenge $15,000 – 64MS/64WS/32MD/16WD/16XD | (Japan) Miki Komori (Japan) Nao Miyoshi; 21-18, 21-15 | (Japan) Michiko Kanagami (Japan) Yuki Anai |
| June 6 | Maldives International; Malé, Maldives; International Challenge $15,000 – 64MS/64WS/32MD/16WD/16XD | (Canada) Toby Ng (Canada) Grace Gao; 10-21, 21-12, 21-9 | (India) Arun Vishnu (India) Aparna Balan |
| June 6 | Thailand Open; Bangkok, Thailand; Grand Prix Gold $120,000 – 64MS/32WS/32MD/32WD/32XD; Draw | (China) Chen Long; 21–8, 21-19 | (South Korea) Lee Hyun-il |
| June 6 | Thailand Open; Bangkok, Thailand; Grand Prix Gold $120,000 – 64MS/32WS/32MD/32WD/32XD; Draw | (China) Li Xuerui; 14-21, 21-14, 21-14 | (China) Jiang Yanjiao |
| June 6 | Thailand Open; Bangkok, Thailand; Grand Prix Gold $120,000 – 64MS/32WS/32MD/32WD/32XD; Draw | (South Korea) Jung Jae-sung (South Korea) Lee Yong-dae; 24-22, 21-14 | (Indonesia) Alvent Yulianto Chandra (Indonesia) Hendra Aprida Gunawan |
| June 6 | Thailand Open; Bangkok, Thailand; Grand Prix Gold $120,000 – 64MS/32WS/32MD/32WD/32XD; Draw | (China) Tian Qing (China) Zhao Yunlei; 21-7, 21-8 | (China) Cheng Shu (China) Bao Yixin |
| June 6 | Thailand Open; Bangkok, Thailand; Grand Prix Gold $120,000 – 64MS/32WS/32MD/32WD/32XD; Draw | (Chinese Taipei) Lee Sheng-mu (Chinese Taipei) Chien Yu-chin; 21-10, 23-21 | (Indonesia) Nova Widianto (Indonesia) Vita Marissa |
| June 6 | Lithuanian International; Kaunas, Lithuania; International Series $5,000 – 32MS/32WS/32MD/16WD/32XD | (Lithuania) Kestutis Navickas; 21-17, 12-21, 21-11 | (Republic of Ireland) Scott Evans |
| June 6 | Lithuanian International; Kaunas, Lithuania; International Series $5,000 – 32MS/32WS/32MD/16WD/32XD | (Republic of Ireland) Chloe Magee; 21-11, 23-21 | (Iceland) Ragna Ingolfsdottir |
| June 6 | Lithuanian International; Kaunas, Lithuania; International Series $5,000 – 32MS/32WS/32MD/16WD/32XD | (Poland) Łukasz Moreń (Poland) Wojciech Szkudlarczyk; 21-12, 24-22 | (Republic of Ireland) Sam Magee (Republic of Ireland) Tony Stephenson |
| June 6 | Lithuanian International; Kaunas, Lithuania; International Series $5,000 – 32MS/32WS/32MD/16WD/32XD | (Ukraine) Ganna Kobtseva (Ukraine) Elena Prus; 21-12, 21-19 | (Ukraine) Marija Ulitina (Ukraine) Natalya Voytsekh |
| June 6 | Lithuanian International; Kaunas, Lithuania; International Series $5,000 – 32MS/32WS/32MD/16WD/32XD | (Republic of Ireland) Sam Magee (Republic of Ireland) Chloe Magee; 21-9, 15-21, 21-19 | (Poland) Wojciech Szkudlarczyk (Poland) Agnieszka Wojtkowska |
| June 6 | Altona International; Melbourne, Victoria, Australia; International Series $5,000 – 32MS/16WS/32MD/8WD/16XD | (Malaysia) Yogendran Krishnan; 21-14, 21-12 | (New Zealand) Michael Fowke |
| June 6 | Altona International; Melbourne, Victoria, Australia; International Series $5,000 – 32MS/16WS/32MD/8WD/16XD | (United States) Karyn Cecelia Velez; 24-22, 21-17 | (Australia) Victoria Na |
| June 6 | Altona International; Melbourne, Victoria, Australia; International Series $5,000 – 32MS/16WS/32MD/8WD/16XD | (Australia) Ross Smith (Australia) Glenn Warfe; 21-17, 21-13 | (New Zealand) Kevin Dennerly-Minturn (New Zealand) Oliver Leydon-Davis |
| June 6 | Altona International; Melbourne, Victoria, Australia; International Series $5,000 – 32MS/16WS/32MD/8WD/16XD | (Australia) Leanne Choo (Australia) Renuga Veeran; 21-10, 21-5 | (New Zealand) Amanda Brown (New Zealand) Stephanie Cheng |
| June 6 | Altona International; Melbourne, Victoria, Australia; International Series $5,000 – 32MS/16WS/32MD/8WD/16XD | (Australia) Glenn Warfe (Australia) Leanne Choo; 22-20, 21-11 | (New Zealand) Kevin Dennerly-Minturn (New Zealand) Stephanie Cheng |
| June 13 | Singapore Open; Singapore; Super Series $200,000 – 32MS/32WS/32MD/32WD/32XD; Draw | (China) Chen Jin; Walkover | (China) Lin Dan |
| June 13 | Singapore Open; Singapore; Super Series $200,000 – 32MS/32WS/32MD/32WD/32XD; Draw | (China) Wang Xin; 21-19, 21-17 | (Denmark) Tine Baun |
| June 13 | Singapore Open; Singapore; Super Series $200,000 – 32MS/32WS/32MD/32WD/32XD; Draw | (China) Cai Yun (China) Fu Haifeng; 21-17, 21-13 | (Indonesia) Alvent Yulianto Chandra (Indonesia) Hendra Aprida Gunawan |
| June 13 | Singapore Open; Singapore; Super Series $200,000 – 32MS/32WS/32MD/32WD/32XD; Draw | (China) Tian Qing (China) Zhao Yunlei; 21-13, 21-16 | (South Korea) Ha Jung-eun (South Korea) Kim Min-jung |
| June 13 | Singapore Open; Singapore; Super Series $200,000 – 32MS/32WS/32MD/32WD/32XD; Draw | (Indonesia) Tontowi Ahmad (Indonesia) Liliyana Natsir; 21-14, 27-25 | (Chinese Taipei) Chen Hung-ling (Chinese Taipei) Cheng Wen-hsing |
| June 13 | European Club Championships; Zwolle, Netherlands; CC Team Championships; 15 teams | (Netherlands) BC Duinwijck; 4–2 | (Netherlands) Van Zundert Velo |
| June 13 | Mauritius International; Port Louis, Mauritius; International Series $5,000 – 64MS/32WS/32MD/16WD/16XD | (India) Chetan Anand; 21-11, 21-14 | (Malaysia) Chiang Jiann Shiarng |
| June 13 | Mauritius International; Port Louis, Mauritius; International Series $5,000 – 64MS/32WS/32MD/16WD/16XD | (Canada) Nicole Grether; 21-10, 21-12 | (Canada) Charmaine Reid |
| June 13 | Mauritius International; Port Louis, Mauritius; International Series $5,000 – 64MS/32WS/32MD/16WD/16XD | (India) Manu Attri (India) Jishnu Sanyal; 21-19, 21-9 | (South Africa) Dorian James (South Africa) Willem Viljoen |
| June 13 | Mauritius International; Port Louis, Mauritius; International Series $5,000 – 64MS/32WS/32MD/16WD/16XD | (Canada) Nicole Grether (Canada) Charmaine Reid; 21-10, 21-7 | (South Africa) Michelle Edwards (South Africa) Annari Viljoen |
| June 13 | Mauritius International; Port Louis, Mauritius; International Series $5,000 – 64MS/32WS/32MD/16WD/16XD | (South Africa) Dorian James (South Africa) Michelle Edwards; 21-16, 21-11 | (Egypt) Abdelrahman Kashkal (Egypt) Hadia Hosny |
| June 13 | Counties Manukau International; Auckland, New Zealand; Future Series; 64MS/16WS/16MD/16WD/32XD | (Malaysia) Yogendran Krishnan; 21-10, 21-17 | (New Zealand) James Eunson |
| June 13 | Counties Manukau International; Auckland, New Zealand; Future Series; 64MS/16WS/16MD/16WD/32XD | (United States) Karyn Velez; 21-12 21-15 | (Australia) Victoria Na |
| June 13 | Counties Manukau International; Auckland, New Zealand; Future Series; 64MS/16WS/16MD/16WD/32XD | (New Zealand) Daniel Shirley (England) Andrew Smith; 21-12, 21-10 | (Australia) Wesley Caulkett (Australia) Raymond Tam |
| June 13 | Counties Manukau International; Auckland, New Zealand; Future Series; 64MS/16WS/16MD/16WD/32XD | (New Zealand) Doriana Rivera Aliaga (New Zealand) Madeleine Stapleton; 21-17, 12-21, 21-18 | (New Zealand) Emma Chapple (New Zealand) Louise Mckenzie |
| June 13 | Counties Manukau International; Auckland, New Zealand; Future Series; 64MS/16WS/16MD/16WD/32XD | (New Zealand) Daniel Shirley (New Zealand) Gabby Aves; 21-11, 21-17 | (New Zealand) Oliver Leydon-Davis (New Zealand) Susannah Leydon-Davis |
| June 20 | Indonesia Open; Jakarta, Indonesia; Super Series Premier $600,000 – 32MS/32WS/32MD/32WD/32XD; Draw | (Malaysia) Lee Chong Wei; 21-11, 21-7 | (Denmark) Peter Gade |
| June 20 | Indonesia Open; Jakarta, Indonesia; Super Series Premier $600,000 – 32MS/32WS/32MD/32WD/32XD; Draw | (China) Wang Yihan; 12-21, 23-21, 21-14 | (India) Saina Nehwal |
| June 20 | Indonesia Open; Jakarta, Indonesia; Super Series Premier $600,000 – 32MS/32WS/32MD/32WD/32XD; Draw | (China) Cai Yun (China) Fu Haifeng; 21-13, 21-12 | (China) Chai Biao (China) Guo Zhendong |
| June 20 | Indonesia Open; Jakarta, Indonesia; Super Series Premier $600,000 – 32MS/32WS/32MD/32WD/32XD; Draw | (China) Wang Xiaoli (China) Yu Yang; 21-12, 21-10 | (Indonesia) Vita Marissa (Indonesia) Nadya Melati |
| June 20 | Indonesia Open; Jakarta, Indonesia; Super Series Premier $600,000 – 32MS/32WS/32MD/32WD/32XD; Draw | (China) Zhang Nan (China) Zhao Yunlei; 20-22, 21-14, 21-9 | (Indonesia) Tontowi Ahmad (Indonesia) Liliyana Natsir |
| June 20 | Kenya International; Nairobi, Kenya; International Series $5,000 – 64MS/32WS/32MD/16WD/16XD | (Russia) Vladimir Malkov; 20-22, 25-23, 21-11 | (Peru) Rodrigo Pacheco |
| June 20 | Kenya International; Nairobi, Kenya; International Series $5,000 – 64MS/32WS/32MD/16WD/16XD | (Turkey) Özge Bayrak; 21-18, 21-11 | (Turkey) Oznur Caliskan |
| June 20 | Kenya International; Nairobi, Kenya; International Series $5,000 – 64MS/32WS/32MD/16WD/16XD | (India) Manu Attri (India) Jishnu Sanyal; 21-14, 21-13 | (South Africa) Dorian James (South Africa) Willem Viljoen |
| June 20 | Kenya International; Nairobi, Kenya; International Series $5,000 – 64MS/32WS/32MD/16WD/16XD | (Turkey) Özge Bayrak (Turkey) Neslihan Yigit; 21-15, 21-19 | (South Africa) Michelle Edwards (South Africa) Annari Viljoen |
| June 20 | Kenya International; Nairobi, Kenya; International Series $5,000 – 64MS/32WS/32MD/16WD/16XD | (Vietnam) Lê Hà Anh (Vietnam) Lê Thu Huyền; 23-25, 21-14, 21-19 | (South Africa) Dorian James (South Africa) Michelle Edwards |
| June 27 | Russian Open; Vladivostok, Russia; Grand Prix $50,000 – 64MS/32WS/32MD/16WD/32XD; Draw | (China) Zhou Wenlong; 21-18, 21-15 | (China) Tian Houwei |
| June 27 | Russian Open; Vladivostok, Russia; Grand Prix $50,000 – 64MS/32WS/32MD/16WD/32XD; Draw | (China) Lu Lan; 20-22, 21-15, 23-21 | (China) Chen Xiaojia |
| June 27 | Russian Open; Vladivostok, Russia; Grand Prix $50,000 – 64MS/32WS/32MD/16WD/32XD; Draw | (Japan) Naoki Kawamae (Japan) Shoji Sato; 21-18, 21-17 | (Japan) Hiroyuki Endo (Japan) Kenichi Hayakawa |
| June 27 | Russian Open; Vladivostok, Russia; Grand Prix $50,000 – 64MS/32WS/32MD/16WD/32XD; Draw | (Russia) Valeria Sorokina (Russia) Nina Vislova; 22-20, 21-18 | (Japan) Misaki Matsutomo (Japan) Ayaka Takahashi |
| June 27 | Russian Open; Vladivostok, Russia; Grand Prix $50,000 – 64MS/32WS/32MD/16WD/32XD; Draw | (Russia) Aleksandr Nikolaenko (Russia) Valeria Sorokina; 21-18, 21-14 | (Japan) Shintaro Ikeda (Japan) Reiko Shiota |

=== July ===
| Week of | Tournament | Champions | Runners-up |
|---|---|---|---|
| July 4 | White Nights; Gatchina, Russia; International Challenge $15,000 – 64MS/32WS/32MD/16WD/32XD | (Chinese Taipei) Hsu Jen-hao; 21-18, 14-21, 21-12 | (Singapore) Derek Wong |
| July 4 | White Nights; Gatchina, Russia; International Challenge $15,000 – 64MS/32WS/32MD/16WD/32XD | (Indonesia) Fransisca Ratnasari; 21-15, 21-23, 21-11 | (Indonesia) Maria Kristin Yulianti |
| July 4 | White Nights; Gatchina, Russia; International Challenge $15,000 – 64MS/32WS/32MD/16WD/32XD | (Indonesia) Rian Sukmawan (Indonesia) Rendra Wijaya; 14-21, 21-13, 21-12 | (Indonesia) Fernando Kurniawan (Indonesia) Wifqi Windarto |
| July 4 | White Nights; Gatchina, Russia; International Challenge $15,000 – 64MS/32WS/32MD/16WD/32XD | (Russia) Irina Hlebko (Russia) Anastasia Russkikh; 21-17, 21-19 | (Russia) Tatyana Bibik (Russia) Olga Golovanova |
| July 4 | White Nights; Gatchina, Russia; International Challenge $15,000 – 64MS/32WS/32MD/16WD/32XD | (Singapore) Danny Bawa Chrisnanta (Singapore) Vanessa Neo; 21-18, 19-21, 21-15 | (France) Baptiste Carême (France) Audrey Fontaine |
| July 11 | U.S. Open; Los Angeles, United States; Grand Prix Gold $120,000 – 64MS/32WS/32MD/32WD/32XD; Draw | (Japan) Sho Sasaki; 21-17, 21-18 | (Vietnam) Nguyễn Tiến Minh |
| July 11 | U.S. Open; Los Angeles, United States; Grand Prix Gold $120,000 – 64MS/32WS/32MD/32WD/32XD; Draw | (Chinese Taipei) Tai Tzu-ying; 21-16, 19-21, 21-6 | (Japan) Sayaka Sato |
| July 11 | U.S. Open; Los Angeles, United States; Grand Prix Gold $120,000 – 64MS/32WS/32MD/32WD/32XD; Draw | (South Korea) Ko Sung-hyun (South Korea) Lee Yong-dae; 21-9, 21-19 | (United States) Howard Bach (United States) Tony Gunawan |
| July 11 | U.S. Open; Los Angeles, United States; Grand Prix Gold $120,000 – 64MS/32WS/32MD/32WD/32XD; Draw | (South Korea) Ha Jung-eun (South Korea) Kim Min-jung; 14-21, 22-20, 21-18 | (South Korea) Jung Kyung-eun (South Korea) Kim Ha-na |
| July 11 | U.S. Open; Los Angeles, United States; Grand Prix Gold $120,000 – 64MS/32WS/32MD/32WD/32XD; Draw | (South Korea) Lee Yong-dae (South Korea) Ha Jung-eun; 21-19, 21-13 | (Chinese Taipei) Chen Hung-ling (Chinese Taipei) Cheng Wen-hsing |
| July 18 | Canada Open; Richmond, British Columbia, Canada; Grand Prix $50,000 – 64MS/32WS/32MD/32WD/32XD; Draw | (Germany) Marc Zwiebler; 21-13, 25-23 | (Indonesia) Taufik Hidayat |
| July 18 | Canada Open; Richmond, British Columbia, Canada; Grand Prix $50,000 – 64MS/32WS/32MD/32WD/32XD; Draw | (Chinese Taipei) Cheng Shao-chieh; 21-15, 21-11 | (France) Pi Hongyan |
| July 18 | Canada Open; Richmond, British Columbia, Canada; Grand Prix $50,000 – 64MS/32WS/32MD/32WD/32XD; Draw | (South Korea) Ko Sung-hyun (South Korea) Lee Yong-dae; 21-18, 21-16 | (China) Liu Xiaolong (China) Qiu Zihan |
| July 18 | Canada Open; Richmond, British Columbia, Canada; Grand Prix $50,000 – 64MS/32WS/32MD/32WD/32XD; Draw | (China) Cheng Shu (China) Bao Yixin; 21-13, 23-21 | (Chinese Taipei) Cheng Wen-hsing (Chinese Taipei) Chien Yu-chin |
| July 18 | Canada Open; Richmond, British Columbia, Canada; Grand Prix $50,000 – 64MS/32WS/32MD/32WD/32XD; Draw | (Germany) Michael Fuchs (Germany) Birgit Michels; 21-10, 23-21 | (Chinese Taipei) Chen Hung-ling (Chinese Taipei) Cheng Wen-hsing |
| July 18 | Indonesia International; Surabaya, Indonesia; International Challenge $15,000 – 256MS/128WS/128MD/64WD/64XD | (Indonesia) Tommy Sugiarto; 21-15, 13-21, 21-15 | (Indonesia) Alamsyah Yunus |
| July 18 | Indonesia International; Surabaya, Indonesia; International Challenge $15,000 – 256MS/128WS/128MD/64WD/64XD | (India) P. V. Sindhu; 21-16, 21-11 | (Indonesia) Fransisca Ratnasari |
| July 18 | Indonesia International; Surabaya, Indonesia; International Challenge $15,000 – 256MS/128WS/128MD/64WD/64XD | (Indonesia) Rendra Wijaya (Indonesia) Rian Sukmawan; 21-13, 19-21, 21-16 | (Malaysia) Ow Yao Han (Malaysia) Tan Wee Kiong |
| July 18 | Indonesia International; Surabaya, Indonesia; International Challenge $15,000 – 256MS/128WS/128MD/64WD/64XD | (Indonesia) Della Destiara Haris (Indonesia) Suci Rizki Andini; 21-16, 21-16 | (Indonesia) Devi Tika Permatasari (Indonesia) Keshya Nurvita Hanadia |
| July 18 | Indonesia International; Surabaya, Indonesia; International Challenge $15,000 – 256MS/128WS/128MD/64WD/64XD | (Indonesia) Andhika Anhar (Indonesia) Keshya Nurvita Hanadia; 21-15, 21-19 | (Indonesia) Rendra Wijaya (Indonesia) Maria Elfira Christina |
| July 25 | Singapore International; Singapore; International Series $5,000 – 64MS/32WS/32MD/32WD/32XD | (Japan) Kazuteru Kozai; 21-17, 23-21 | (Indonesia) Wisnu Yuli Prasetyo |
| July 25 | Singapore International; Singapore; International Series $5,000 – 64MS/32WS/32MD/32WD/32XD | (Singapore) Xing Aiying; 21-10, 21-12 | (Singapore) Gu Juan |
| July 25 | Singapore International; Singapore; International Series $5,000 – 64MS/32WS/32MD/32WD/32XD | (Indonesia) Agripina Prima Rahmanto Putra (Indonesia) Marcus Fernaldi Gideon; 21-17, 21-9 | (Indonesia) Kevin Sanjaya Sukamuljo (Indonesia) Lukhi Apri Nugroho |
| July 25 | Singapore International; Singapore; International Series $5,000 – 64MS/32WS/32MD/32WD/32XD | (Japan) Aya Shimozaki (Japan) Emi Moue; 21-13, 21-14 | (Singapore) Dellis Yuliana (Singapore) Vanessa Neo |
| July 25 | Singapore International; Singapore; International Series $5,000 – 64MS/32WS/32MD/32WD/32XD | (Singapore) Danny Bawa Chrisnanta (Singapore) Vanessa Neo; 23-21 21-14 | (Malaysia) Mohd Razif Abdul Latif (Malaysia) Amelia Alicia Anscelly |

=== August ===
| Week of | Tournament | Champions | Runners-up |
|---|---|---|---|
| August 8 | World Championships; London, England; BWF Major Event; 64MS/64WS/64MD/64WD/64XD; Draw | (China) Lin Dan; 20-22, 21-14, 23-21 | (Malaysia) Lee Chong Wei |
| August 8 | World Championships; London, England; BWF Major Event; 64MS/64WS/64MD/64WD/64XD; Draw | (China) Wang Yihan; 21-15, 21-10 | (Chinese Taipei) Cheng Shao-chieh |
| August 8 | World Championships; London, England; BWF Major Event; 64MS/64WS/64MD/64WD/64XD; Draw | (China) Cai Yun (China) Fu Haifeng; 24-22, 21-16 | (South Korea) Ko Sung-hyun (South Korea) Yoo Yeon-seong |
| August 8 | World Championships; London, England; BWF Major Event; 64MS/64WS/64MD/64WD/64XD; Draw | (China) Wang Xiaoli (China) Yu Yang; 22-20, 21-11 | (China) Tian Qing (China) Zhao Yunlei |
| August 8 | World Championships; London, England; BWF Major Event; 64MS/64WS/64MD/64WD/64XD; Draw | (China) Zhang Nan (China) Zhao Yunlei; 21-15, 21-7 | (England) Chris Adcock (Scotland) Imogen Bankier |
| August 15 | Summer Universiade; Shenzhen, Guangdong, China; FISU; Draw | (Indonesia) Indonesia; 3-1 | China |
| August 15 | Summer Universiade; Shenzhen, Guangdong, China; FISU; Draw | (Thailand) Suppanyu Avihingsanon; 21-18, 21-16 | (China) Wen Kai |
| August 15 | Summer Universiade; Shenzhen, Guangdong, China; FISU; Draw | (Chinese Taipei) Cheng Shao-chieh; 21-18, 21-15 | (Chinese Taipei) Pai Hsiao-Ma |
| August 15 | Summer Universiade; Shenzhen, Guangdong, China; FISU; Draw | (Thailand) Bodin Isara (Thailand) Maneepong Jongjit; 21-10, 21-16 | (Chinese Taipei) Fang Chieh-min (Chinese Taipei) Lee Sheng-mu |
| August 15 | Summer Universiade; Shenzhen, Guangdong, China; FISU; Draw | (South Korea) Eom Hye-won (South Korea) Chang Ye-na; 21-11, 21-14 | (Chinese Taipei) Pai Hsiao-ma (Chinese Taipei) Cheng Shao-chieh |
| August 15 | Summer Universiade; Shenzhen, Guangdong, China; FISU; Draw | (South Korea) Shin Baek-cheol (South Korea) Eom Hye-won; 15-21, 21-11, 21-19 | (Chinese Taipei) Lee Sheng-mu (Chinese Taipei) Hsieh Pei-chen |
| August 22 | Vietnam Open; Ho Chi Minh City, Vietnam; Grand Prix $50,000 – 64MS/32WS/32MD/32WD/32XD; Draw | (Vietnam) Nguyễn Tiến Minh; 21-13, 21-17 | (Japan) Sho Sasaki |
| August 22 | Vietnam Open; Ho Chi Minh City, Vietnam; Grand Prix $50,000 – 64MS/32WS/32MD/32WD/32XD; Draw | (Singapore) Fu Mingtian; 21-18, 16-21, 21-8 | (Japan) Kaori Imabeppu |
| August 22 | Vietnam Open; Ho Chi Minh City, Vietnam; Grand Prix $50,000 – 64MS/32WS/32MD/32WD/32XD; Draw | (Indonesia) Angga Pratama (Indonesia) Rian Agung Saputro; 21-12, 16-21, 21-19 | (Singapore) Danny Bawa Chrisnanta (Singapore) Chayut Triyachart |
| August 22 | Vietnam Open; Ho Chi Minh City, Vietnam; Grand Prix $50,000 – 64MS/32WS/32MD/32WD/32XD; Draw | (Indonesia) Anneke Feinya Agustin (Indonesia) Nitya Krishinda Maheswari; 23-21, 26-24 | (Singapore) Shinta Mulia Sari (Singapore) Yao Lei |
| August 22 | Vietnam Open; Ho Chi Minh City, Vietnam; Grand Prix $50,000 – 64MS/32WS/32MD/32WD/32XD; Draw | (Russia) Vitalij Durkin (Russia) Nina Vislova; 21-16, 21-13 | (South Korea) Chung Eui-seok (South Korea) Yoo Hyun-young |
| August 22 | Namibia International; Windhoek, Namibia; Future Series; 32MS/16WS/16MD/8WD/16XD | (Iran) Ali Shahhosseini; 21-11, 21-17 | (Iran) Kaveh Mehrabi |
| August 22 | Namibia International; Windhoek, Namibia; Future Series; 32MS/16WS/16MD/8WD/16XD | (Australia) Victoria Na; 25-27, 21-17, 21-17 | (Austria) Claudia Mayer |
| August 22 | Namibia International; Windhoek, Namibia; Future Series; 32MS/16WS/16MD/8WD/16XD | (South Africa) Dorian James (South Africa) Willem Viljoen; 21-13, 21-13 | (Egypt) Ali Ahmed El-Khateeb (Egypt) Abdelrahman Kashkal |
| August 22 | Namibia International; Windhoek, Namibia; Future Series; 32MS/16WS/16MD/8WD/16XD | (South Africa) Michelle Butler-Emmett (South Africa) Stacey Doubell; 21-14, 21-9 | (Egypt) Hadia Hosny (Morocco) Rajae Rochdy |
| August 22 | Namibia International; Windhoek, Namibia; Future Series; 32MS/16WS/16MD/8WD/16XD | (Egypt) Abdelrahman Kashkal (Egypt) Hadia Hosny; 21-14, 16-21, 22-20 | (Australia) Luke Chong (Australia) Victoria Na |
| August 29 | Slovak Open; Prešov, Slovakia; International Series $5,000 – 32MS/32WS/32MD/32WD/32XD | (Czech Republic) Petr Koukal; 21-11, 21-15 | (Poland) Hubert Paczek |
| August 29 | Slovak Open; Prešov, Slovakia; International Series $5,000 – 32MS/32WS/32MD/32WD/32XD | (Finland) Anu Nieminen; 21-14, 19-21, 21-16 | (Netherlands) Patty Stolzenbach |
| August 29 | Slovak Open; Prešov, Slovakia; International Series $5,000 – 32MS/32WS/32MD/32WD/32XD | (Netherlands) Jorrit De Ruiter (Netherlands) Dave Khodabux; 21-10, 22-20 | (Poland) Łukasz Moreń (Poland) Wojciech Szkudlarczyk |
| August 29 | Slovak Open; Prešov, Slovakia; International Series $5,000 – 32MS/32WS/32MD/32WD/32XD | (Netherlands) Selena Piek (Netherlands) Iris Tabeling; 21-7, 21-9 | (Turkey) Özge Bayrak (Turkey) Neslihan Yiğit |
| August 29 | Slovak Open; Prešov, Slovakia; International Series $5,000 – 32MS/32WS/32MD/32WD/32XD | (Netherlands) Dave Khodabux (Netherlands) Selena Piek; 21-13, 21-18 | (Poland) Wojciech Szkudlarczyk (Poland) Agnieszka Wojtkowska |
| August 29 | Carebaco International; Saint Michael, Barbados; Future Series; 64MS/32WS/16MD/16WD/32XD | (United States) Howard Shu; 14-21, 21-17, 22-20 | (Guatemala) Rodolfo Ramirez |
| August 29 | Carebaco International; Saint Michael, Barbados; Future Series; 64MS/32WS/16MD/16WD/32XD | (Brazil) Lohaynny Vicente; 21-15, 21-18 | (Brazil) Luana Vicente |
| August 29 | Carebaco International; Saint Michael, Barbados; Future Series; 64MS/32WS/16MD/16WD/32XD | (Suriname) Virgil Soeroredjo (Suriname) Mitchel Wongsodikromo; 22-20, 21-18 | (Dominican Republic) Nelson Javier (Dominican Republic) Alberto Rapozo |
| August 29 | Carebaco International; Saint Michael, Barbados; Future Series; 64MS/32WS/16MD/16WD/32XD | (Brazil) Lohaynny Vicente (Brazil) Luana Vicente; 21-16, 21-11 | (Barbados) Mariama Eastmond (Barbados) Shari Watson |
| August 29 | Carebaco International; Saint Michael, Barbados; Future Series; 64MS/32WS/16MD/16WD/32XD | (Suriname) Mitchel Wongsodikromo (Suriname) Crystal Leefmans; 21-17, 21-11 | (Jamaica) Gareth Henry (Jamaica) Geordine Henry |

=== September ===
| Week of | Tournament | Champions | Runners-up |
|---|---|---|---|
| September 1 | Zimbabwe International; Harare, Zimbabwe; Future Series; 32MS/32WS/8MD/8WD/16XD | (Iran) Ali Shahhosseini; 13-21, 21-11, 21-13 | (Iran) Kaveh Mehrabi |
| September 1 | Zimbabwe International; Harare, Zimbabwe; Future Series; 32MS/32WS/8MD/8WD/16XD | (Austria) Claudia Mayer; 18-21, 21-17, 21-19 | (Australia) Victoria Na |
| September 1 | Zimbabwe International; Harare, Zimbabwe; Future Series; 32MS/32WS/8MD/8WD/16XD | (Zimbabwe) Moses Chipurura (Zimbabwe) Lawrence Mdege; 21-19, 21-19 | (Zimbabwe) Willard Alronso (Zimbabwe) Rishi Verma |
| September 1 | Zimbabwe International; Harare, Zimbabwe; Future Series; 32MS/32WS/8MD/8WD/16XD | (Zimbabwe) Audrey Matsanura (Zimbabwe) Olga Matsaruna; 21-9, 21-17 | (Zimbabwe) Munashe Kambarani (Zimbabwe) Kudzai Panganai |
| September 1 | Zimbabwe International; Harare, Zimbabwe; Future Series; 32MS/32WS/8MD/8WD/16XD | (Australia) Luke Chong (Australia) Victoria Na; 21-3, 21-6 | (Zimbabwe) Lawrence Mdege (Zimbabwe) Kudzai Panganai |
| September 5 | Chinese Taipei Open; Xinzhuang, Chinese Taipei; Grand Prix Gold $200,000 – 64MS/32WS/32MD/32WD/32XD; Draw | (Indonesia) Tommy Sugiarto; 21-15, 15-21, 21-17 | (Thailand) Tanongsak Saensomboonsuk |
| September 5 | Chinese Taipei Open; Xinzhuang, Chinese Taipei; Grand Prix Gold $200,000 – 64MS/32WS/32MD/32WD/32XD; Draw | (South Korea) Sung Ji-hyun; 22-20, 21-14 | (Thailand) Ratchanok Intanon |
| September 5 | Chinese Taipei Open; Xinzhuang, Chinese Taipei; Grand Prix Gold $200,000 – 64MS/32WS/32MD/32WD/32XD; Draw | (South Korea) Ko Sung-hyun (South Korea) Yoo Yeon-seong; 23-21, 21-17 | (South Korea) Jung Jae-sung (South Korea) Lee Yong-dae |
| September 5 | Chinese Taipei Open; Xinzhuang, Chinese Taipei; Grand Prix Gold $200,000 – 64MS/32WS/32MD/32WD/32XD; Draw | (South Korea) Ha Jung-eun (South Korea) Kim Min-jung; 17-21, 21-18, 2-0 Retired | (Indonesia) Meiliana Jauhari (Indonesia) Greysia Polii |
| September 5 | Chinese Taipei Open; Xinzhuang, Chinese Taipei; Grand Prix Gold $200,000 – 64MS/32WS/32MD/32WD/32XD; Draw | (South Korea) Ko Sung-hyun (South Korea) Eom Hye-won; 24-22, 16-21, 21-17 | (Indonesia) Tontowi Ahmad (Indonesia) Liliyana Natsir |
| September 5 | Kharkiv International; Kharkiv, Ukraine; International Challenge $15,000 – 32MS/32WS/32MD/16WD/32XD | (France) Brice Leverdez; 9-21, 21-14, 21-14 | (Ukraine) Dmytro Zavadskyi |
| September 5 | Kharkiv International; Kharkiv, Ukraine; International Challenge $15,000 – 32MS/32WS/32MD/16WD/32XD | (Germany) Olga Konon; 21-9, 21-10 | (Scotland) Susan Egelstaff |
| September 5 | Kharkiv International; Kharkiv, Ukraine; International Challenge $15,000 – 32MS/32WS/32MD/16WD/32XD | (Russia) Vladimir Ivanov (Russia) Ivan Sozonov; 19-21, 21-19, 21-16 | (Poland) Adam Cwalina (Poland) Michał Łogosz |
| September 5 | Kharkiv International; Kharkiv, Ukraine; International Challenge $15,000 – 32MS/32WS/32MD/16WD/32XD | (Singapore) Shinta Mulia Sari (Singapore) Yao Lei; 21-17, 18-21, 21-15 | (Germany) Sandra Marinello (Germany) Birgit Michels |
| September 5 | Kharkiv International; Kharkiv, Ukraine; International Challenge $15,000 – 32MS/32WS/32MD/16WD/32XD | (Germany) Michael Fuchs (Germany) Birgit Michels; 21-18, 21-14 | (Singapore) Chayut Triyachart (Singapore) Yao Lei |
| September 10 | China Masters; Changzhou, China; Superseries $200,000 – 32MS/32WS/32MD/32WD/32XD; Draw | (China) Chen Long; 21-16, 22-20 | (China) Chen Jin |
| September 10 | China Masters; Changzhou, China; Superseries $200,000 – 32MS/32WS/32MD/32WD/32XD; Draw | (China) Wang Shixian; 21-16, 8-5 Retired | (China) Jiang Yanjiao |
| September 10 | China Masters; Changzhou, China; Superseries $200,000 – 32MS/32WS/32MD/32WD/32XD; Draw | (South Korea) Jung Jae-sung (South Korea) Lee Yong-dae; 21-17, 21-10 | (China) Cai Yun (China) Fu Haifeng |
| September 10 | China Masters; Changzhou, China; Superseries $200,000 – 32MS/32WS/32MD/32WD/32XD; Draw | (China) Xia Huan (China) Tang Jinhua; 21-19 Retired | (China) Wang Xiaoli (China) Yu Yang |
| September 10 | China Masters; Changzhou, China; Superseries $200,000 – 32MS/32WS/32MD/32WD/32XD; Draw | (China) Xu Chen (China) Ma Jin; 21-13, 21-16 | (South Korea) Yoo Yeon-seong (South Korea) Chang Ye-na |
| September 10 | Guatemala International; Guatemala City, Guatemala; International Challenge $15,000 – 64MS/64WS/32MD/32WD/32XD | (Russia) Ivan Sozonov; 21-16, 9-21, 21-18 | (Russia) Vladimir Ivanov |
| September 10 | Guatemala International; Guatemala City, Guatemala; International Challenge $15,000 – 64MS/64WS/32MD/32WD/32XD | (Canada) Michelle Li; 21-15, 21-13 | (Switzerland) Jeanine Cicognini |
| September 10 | Guatemala International; Guatemala City, Guatemala; International Challenge $15,000 – 64MS/64WS/32MD/32WD/32XD | (Russia) Vladimir Ivanov (Russia) Ivan Sozonov; 21-13, 21-16 | (Canada) Adrian Liu (Canada) Derrick Ng |
| September 10 | Guatemala International; Guatemala City, Guatemala; International Challenge $15,000 – 64MS/64WS/32MD/32WD/32XD | (United States) Eva Lee (United States) Paula Lynn Obañana; 19-21, 21-18, 21-13 | (Canada) Grace Gao (Canada) Joycelyn Ko |
| September 10 | Guatemala International; Guatemala City, Guatemala; International Challenge $15,000 – 64MS/64WS/32MD/32WD/32XD | (Canada) Toby Ng (Canada) Grace Gao; 22-20, 21-14 | (Canada) Derrick Ng (Canada) Alex Bruce |
| September 10 | Belgian International; Mechelen, Belgium; International Challenge $15,000 – 32MS/32WS/32MD/32WD/32XD | (France) Brice Leverdez; 21-7, 13-21, 21-11 | (Indonesia) Andre Kurniawan Tedjono |
| September 10 | Belgian International; Mechelen, Belgium; International Challenge $15,000 – 32MS/32WS/32MD/32WD/32XD | (Germany) Olga Konon; 21-12, 21-13 | (Ukraine) Larisa Griga |
| September 10 | Belgian International; Mechelen, Belgium; International Challenge $15,000 – 32MS/32WS/32MD/32WD/32XD | (Poland) Adam Cwalina (Poland) Michał Łogosz; 21-11, 21-15 | (Austria) Jürgen Koch (Austria) Peter Zauner |
| September 10 | Belgian International; Mechelen, Belgium; International Challenge $15,000 – 32MS/32WS/32MD/32WD/32XD | (Singapore) Shinta Mulia Sari (Singapore) Yao Lei; 21-12, 21-18 | (England) Mariana Agathangelou (England) Heather Olver |
| September 10 | Belgian International; Mechelen, Belgium; International Challenge $15,000 – 32MS/32WS/32MD/32WD/32XD | (Singapore) Chayut Triyachart (Singapore) Yao Lei; 23-25, 21-16, 21-14 | (Netherlands) Jorrit de Ruiter (Netherlands) Selena Piek |
| September 19 | Japan Open; Tokyo, Japan; Super Series $200,000 – 32MS/32WS/32MD/32WD/32XD; Draw | (China) Chen Long; 21-8, 10-21, 21-19 | (Malaysia) Lee Chong Wei |
| September 19 | Japan Open; Tokyo, Japan; Super Series $200,000 – 32MS/32WS/32MD/32WD/32XD; Draw | (China) Wang Yihan; 21-16, 21-14 | (Germany) Juliane Schenk |
| September 19 | Japan Open; Tokyo, Japan; Super Series $200,000 – 32MS/32WS/32MD/32WD/32XD; Draw | (China) Cai Yun (China) Fu Haifeng; 21-13, 23-21 | (Indonesia) Mohammad Ahsan (Indonesia) Bona Septano |
| September 19 | Japan Open; Tokyo, Japan; Super Series $200,000 – 32MS/32WS/32MD/32WD/32XD; Draw | (China) Bao Yixin (China) Zhong Qianxin; 13-21, 25-23, 21-12 | (Chinese Taipei) Chen Wen-hsing (Chinese Taipei) Chien Yu-chin |
| September 19 | Japan Open; Tokyo, Japan; Super Series $200,000 – 32MS/32WS/32MD/32WD/32XD; Draw | (Chinese Taipei) Chen Hung-ling (Chinese Taipei) Cheng Wen-hsing; 21-19, 16-21, 21-15 | (Denmark) Joachim Fischer Nielsen (Denmark) Christinna Pedersen |
| September 19 | Brazil International; São Paulo, Brazil; International Challenge $15,000 – 32MS/32WS/32MD/32WD/32XD | (Poland) Przemysław Wacha; 21-14, 21-19 | (Belgium) Yuhan Tan |
| September 19 | Brazil International; São Paulo, Brazil; International Challenge $15,000 – 32MS/32WS/32MD/32WD/32XD | (Canada) Michelle Li; 21-15, 21-15 | (Japan) Kana Ito |
| September 19 | Brazil International; São Paulo, Brazil; International Challenge $15,000 – 32MS/32WS/32MD/32WD/32XD | (Russia) Vladimir Ivanov (Russia) Ivan Sozonov; 16-21, 21-14, 24-22 | (Poland) Adam Cwalina (Poland) Michał Łogosz |
| September 19 | Brazil International; São Paulo, Brazil; International Challenge $15,000 – 32MS/32WS/32MD/32WD/32XD | (United States) Eva Lee (United States) Paula Lynn Obañana; 21-14, 21-17 | (Canada) Alex Bruce (Canada) Michelle Li |
| September 19 | Brazil International; São Paulo, Brazil; International Challenge $15,000 – 32MS/32WS/32MD/32WD/32XD | (United States) Halim Haryanto (United States) Eva Lee; 21-11, 21-15 | (Australia) Glenn Warfe (Australia) Leanne Choo |
| September 26 | Indonesian Masters; Samarinda, East Kalimantan, Indonesia; Grand Prix Gold $120,000 – 64MS/32WS/32MD/32WD/32XD; Draw | (Indonesia) Dionysius Hayom Rumbaka; 21-16, 21-17 | (Indonesia) Tommy Sugiarto |
| September 26 | Indonesian Masters; Samarinda, East Kalimantan, Indonesia; Grand Prix Gold $120,000 – 64MS/32WS/32MD/32WD/32XD; Draw | (China) Chen Xiaojia; 19-21, 21-15, 21-17 | (France) Pi Hongyan |
| September 26 | Indonesian Masters; Samarinda, East Kalimantan, Indonesia; Grand Prix Gold $120,000 – 64MS/32WS/32MD/32WD/32XD; Draw | (Indonesia) Mohammad Ahsan (Indonesia) Bona Septano; 21-13, 21-14 | (Japan) Hiroyuki Endo (Japan) Kenichi Hayakawa |
| September 26 | Indonesian Masters; Samarinda, East Kalimantan, Indonesia; Grand Prix Gold $120,000 – 64MS/32WS/32MD/32WD/32XD; Draw | (Malaysia) Vivian Hoo (Malaysia) Woon Khe Wei; 19-21, 21-19, 21-18 | (China) Bao Yixin (China) Zhong Qianxin |
| September 26 | Indonesian Masters; Samarinda, East Kalimantan, Indonesia; Grand Prix Gold $120,000 – 64MS/32WS/32MD/32WD/32XD; Draw | (China) He Hanbin (China) Bao Yixin; 21-19, 1-4 Retired | (China) Xu Chen (China) Ma Jin |
| September 26 | Czech International; Brno, Czech Republic; International Challenge $15,000 – 32MS/32WS/32MD/32WD/32XD | (Poland) Przemysław Wacha; 21-19, 21-16 | (Czech Republic) Petr Koukal |
| September 26 | Czech International; Brno, Czech Republic; International Challenge $15,000 – 32MS/32WS/32MD/32WD/32XD | (Czech Republic) Kristína Gavnholt; 21-10, 21-18 | (India) Arundhati Pantawane |
| September 26 | Czech International; Brno, Czech Republic; International Challenge $15,000 – 32MS/32WS/32MD/32WD/32XD | (Poland) Adam Cwalina (Poland) Michał Łogosz; 21-13, 21-16 | (Russia) Vitalij Durkin (Russia) Aleksandr Nikolaenko |
| September 26 | Czech International; Brno, Czech Republic; International Challenge $15,000 – 32MS/32WS/32MD/32WD/32XD | (Russia) Valeria Sorokina (Russia) Nina Vislova; 21-10, 21-16 | (Canada) Nicole Grether (Canada) Charmaine Reid |
| September 26 | Czech International; Brno, Czech Republic; International Challenge $15,000 – 32MS/32WS/32MD/32WD/32XD | (Russia) Aleksandr Nikolaenko (Russia) Valeria Sorokina; 21-15, 21-12 | (Estonia) Gert Künka (Sweden) Amanda Högström |
| September 26 | Colombia International; Bogotá, Colombia; Future Series; 64MS/64WS/32MD/16WD/32XD | (Peru) Andrés Corpancho; 22-20, 21-9 | (Brazil) Lucas Alves |
| September 26 | Colombia International; Bogotá, Colombia; Future Series; 64MS/64WS/32MD/16WD/32XD | (France) Barbara Matias; 21-12, 21-13 | (Puerto Rico) Daneysha Santana |
| September 26 | Colombia International; Bogotá, Colombia; Future Series; 64MS/64WS/32MD/16WD/32XD | (United States) Mathew Fogarty (United States) Nicholas Jinadasa; 21-13, 15-21, 21-17 | (Brazil) Lucas Alves (Peru) Andrés Corpancho |
| September 26 | Colombia International; Bogotá, Colombia; Future Series; 64MS/64WS/32MD/16WD/32XD | (Puerto Rico) Daneysha Santana (Peru) Luz María Zornoza; 21-12, 21-12 | (Peru) Daniela Macías (Peru) Dánica Nishimura |
| September 26 | Colombia International; Bogotá, Colombia; Future Series; 64MS/64WS/32MD/16WD/32XD | (Peru) Andrés Corpancho (Brazil) Renata Carvalho; 21-12, 22-20 | (Argentina) Federico Diaz (Argentina) Victoria Valdesolo |

=== October ===
| Week of | Tournament | Champions | Runners-up |
|---|---|---|---|
| October 3 | Bulgarian International; Sofia, Bulgaria; International Challenge $15,000 – 32MS/32WS/32MD/32WD/32XD | (Poland) Przemyslaw Wacha; 21-11, 11-21, 21-11 | (Malaysia) Tan Chun Seang |
| October 3 | Bulgarian International; Sofia, Bulgaria; International Challenge $15,000 – 32MS/32WS/32MD/32WD/32XD | (Bulgaria) Linda Zetchiri; 21-18, 21-14 | (Turkey) Neslihan Yiğit |
| October 3 | Bulgarian International; Sofia, Bulgaria; International Challenge $15,000 – 32MS/32WS/32MD/32WD/32XD | (Chinese Taipei) Liang Jui-wei (Chinese Taipei) Liao Kuan-hao; 21-12, 22-20 | (Chinese Taipei) Huang Po-yi (Chinese Taipei) Lu Chia-pin |
| October 3 | Bulgarian International; Sofia, Bulgaria; International Challenge $15,000 – 32MS/32WS/32MD/32WD/32XD | (England) Mariana Agathangelou (England) Heather Olver; 18-21, 21-7, 21-10 | (India) Pradnya Gadre (India) Prajakta Sawant |
| October 3 | Bulgarian International; Sofia, Bulgaria; International Challenge $15,000 – 32MS/32WS/32MD/32WD/32XD | (Ukraine) Valeriy Atrashchenkov (Ukraine) Anna Kobceva; 21-18, 19-21, 21-14 | (England) Gary Fox (England) Samantha Ward |
| October 10 | Dutch Open; Almere, Netherlands; Grand Prix $50,000 – 64MS/32WS/32MD/32WD/32XD; Draw | (Chinese Taipei) Hsueh Hsuan-yi; 18-21, 21-15, 21-16 | (Chinese Taipei) Chou Tien-chen |
| October 10 | Dutch Open; Almere, Netherlands; Grand Prix $50,000 – 64MS/32WS/32MD/32WD/32XD; Draw | (Netherlands) Yao Jie; 21-16, 21-17 | (India) P. V. Sindhu |
| October 10 | Dutch Open; Almere, Netherlands; Grand Prix $50,000 – 64MS/32WS/32MD/32WD/32XD; Draw | (Poland) Adam Cwalina (Poland) Michał Łogosz; 21-19, 19-21, 21-14 | (Germany) Ingo Kindervater (Germany) Johannes Schöttler |
| October 10 | Dutch Open; Almere, Netherlands; Grand Prix $50,000 – 64MS/32WS/32MD/32WD/32XD; Draw | (Thailand) Duanganong Aroonkesorn (Thailand) Kunchala Voravichitchaikul; 21-10, 21-16 | (Singapore) Shinta Mulia Sari (Singapore) Yao Lei |
| October 10 | Dutch Open; Almere, Netherlands; Grand Prix $50,000 – 64MS/32WS/32MD/32WD/32XD; Draw | (Thailand) Songphon Anugritayawon (Thailand) Kunchala Voravichitchaikul; 21-17, 24-22 | (Thailand) Sudket Prapakamol (Thailand) Saralee Thungthongkam |
| October 10 | Turkiye Open; Antalya, Turkey; International Series $5,000 – 32MS/32WS/32MD/32WD/32XD | (Germany) Fabian Hammes; 21-17, 21-11 | (Turkey) Murat Sen |
| October 10 | Turkiye Open; Antalya, Turkey; International Series $5,000 – 32MS/32WS/32MD/32WD/32XD | (Greece) Anne Hald Jensen; 14-21, 21-9, 21-18 | (Turkey) Özge Bayrak |
| October 10 | Turkiye Open; Antalya, Turkey; International Series $5,000 – 32MS/32WS/32MD/32WD/32XD | (England) Ben Stawski (Scotland) Paul Van Rietvelde; 21-19, 21-13 | (Denmark) Mikkel Mikkelsen (Denmark) Nikolaj Overgaard |
| October 10 | Turkiye Open; Antalya, Turkey; International Series $5,000 – 32MS/32WS/32MD/32WD/32XD | (Bulgaria) Gabriela Stoeva (Bulgaria) Stefani Stoeva; 21-14, 16-21, 21-10 | (England) Alexandra Langley (England) Lauren Smith |
| October 10 | Turkiye Open; Antalya, Turkey; International Series $5,000 – 32MS/32WS/32MD/32WD/32XD | (England) Ben Stawski (England) Lauren Smith; 21-19, 21-13 | (England) Chris Coles (England) Jessica Fletcher |
| October 17 | Pan American Games; Guadalajara, Mexico; Multisport Event, Grand Prix; 64MS/64WS/16MD/32WD/32XD; Draw | (Guatemala) Kevin Cordón; 23-21, 21-19 | (Cuba) Osleni Guerrero |
| October 17 | Pan American Games; Guadalajara, Mexico; Multisport Event, Grand Prix; 64MS/64WS/16MD/32WD/32XD; Draw | (Canada) Michelle Li; 21-13, 21-12 | (Canada) Joycelyn Ko |
| October 17 | Pan American Games; Guadalajara, Mexico; Multisport Event, Grand Prix; 64MS/64WS/16MD/32WD/32XD; Draw | (United States) Tony Gunawan (United States) Howard Bach; 21-10, 21-14 | (United States) Halim Haryanto (United States) Sattawat Pongnairat |
| October 17 | Pan American Games; Guadalajara, Mexico; Multisport Event, Grand Prix; 64MS/64WS/16MD/32WD/32XD; Draw | (Canada) Alex Bruce (Canada) Michelle Li; 21-15, 21-15 | (United States) Iris Wang (United States) Rena Wang |
| October 17 | Pan American Games; Guadalajara, Mexico; Multisport Event, Grand Prix; 64MS/64WS/16MD/32WD/32XD; Draw | (Canada) Toby Ng (Canada) Grace Gao; 21-13, 9-21, 21-17 | (United States) Halim Haryanto (United States) Eva Lee |
| October 17 | Denmark Open; Odense, Denmark; Super Series Premier $400,000 – 32MS/32WS/32MD/32WD/32XD; Draw | (China) Chen Long; 21-15, 21-18 | (Malaysia) Lee Chong Wei |
| October 17 | Denmark Open; Odense, Denmark; Super Series Premier $400,000 – 32MS/32WS/32MD/32WD/32XD; Draw | (China) Wang Xin; 21-14, 23-21 | (China) Wang Yihan |
| October 17 | Denmark Open; Odense, Denmark; Super Series Premier $400,000 – 32MS/32WS/32MD/32WD/32XD; Draw | (South Korea) Jung Jae-sung (South Korea) Lee Yong-dae; 21-16, 21-17 | (China) Cai Yun (China) Fu Haifeng |
| October 17 | Denmark Open; Odense, Denmark; Super Series Premier $400,000 – 32MS/32WS/32MD/32WD/32XD; Draw | (China) Wang Xiaoli (China) Yu Yang; 22-20, 21-16 | (China) Tian Qing (China) Zhao Yunlei |
| October 17 | Denmark Open; Odense, Denmark; Super Series Premier $400,000 – 32MS/32WS/32MD/32WD/32XD; Draw | (Denmark) Joachim Fischer Nielsen (Denmark) Christinna Pedersen; 22-20, 21-16 | (China) Xu Chen (China) Ma Jin |
| October 17 | Syria International; Damascus, Syria; International Series $5,000 – 64MS/32WS/32MD/16WD/32XD | (Portugal) Pedro Martins; 21-15, 21-19 | (Iran) Kaveh Mehrabi |
| October 17 | Syria International; Damascus, Syria; International Series $5,000 – 64MS/32WS/32MD/16WD/32XD | (Portugal) Telma Santos; 21-14, 21-10 | (Syria) Sanaa Mahmoud |
| October 17 | Syria International; Damascus, Syria; International Series $5,000 – 64MS/32WS/32MD/16WD/32XD | (Syria) Mohammad Sawas (Turkey) Murat Sen; 21-15, 10-21, 22-20 | (Syria) Amar Awad (Syria) Mohamad Saleh |
| October 17 | Syria International; Damascus, Syria; International Series $5,000 – 64MS/32WS/32MD/16WD/32XD | (Syria) Hadil Kareem (Syria) Sanaa Mahmoud; 21-13, 21-12 | (Syria) Tagreed Aljallad (Syria) Sara Hajar |
| October 17 | Syria International; Damascus, Syria; International Series $5,000 – 64MS/32WS/32MD/16WD/32XD | (Syria) Amar Awad (Syria) Sanaa Mahmoud; 21-9, 21-19 | (Jordan) Ehab Noubani (Jordan) Dima Issam Alardah |
| October 17 | Swiss International; Bern, Switzerland; International Challenge $15,000 – 32MS/32WS/32MD/32WD/32XD | (Indonesia) Andre Kurniawan Tedjono; 21-16, 21-12 | (Ukraine) Valeriy Atrashchenkov |
| October 17 | Swiss International; Bern, Switzerland; International Challenge $15,000 – 32MS/32WS/32MD/32WD/32XD | (India) P. V. Sindhu; 21-11, 21-11 | (Germany) Carola Bott |
| October 17 | Swiss International; Bern, Switzerland; International Challenge $15,000 – 32MS/32WS/32MD/32WD/32XD | (Poland) Łukasz Moreń (Poland) Wojciech Szkudlarczyk; 17-21, 21-16, 21-12 | (India) Pranav Chopra (India) Akshay Dewalkar |
| October 17 | Swiss International; Bern, Switzerland; International Challenge $15,000 – 32MS/32WS/32MD/32WD/32XD | (India) Pradnya Gadre (India) Prajakta Sawant; 19-21, 21-10, 21-10 | (France) Laura Choinet (France) Audrey Fontaine |
| October 17 | Swiss International; Bern, Switzerland; International Challenge $15,000 – 32MS/32WS/32MD/32WD/32XD | (Russia) Vitalij Durkin (Russia) Nina Vislova; 22-20, 25-23 | (Russia) Sergey Lunev (Russia) Evgenia Dimova |
| October 17 | Ethiopia International; Addis Ababa, Ethiopia; Future Series; 32MS/32WS/16MD/8WD/16XD | (Iran) Ali Shahosseini; 21-14, 21-11 | (Croatia) Luka Zdenjak |
| October 17 | Ethiopia International; Addis Ababa, Ethiopia; Future Series; 32MS/32WS/16MD/8WD/16XD | (Australia) Victoria Na; 21-13, 15-21, 21-14 | (South Africa) Stacey Doubell |
| October 17 | Ethiopia International; Addis Ababa, Ethiopia; Future Series; 32MS/32WS/16MD/8WD/16XD | (Ethiopia) Ermiyas Tamarat Degefe (Ethiopia) Asnake Sahilu; 21-15, 21-15 | (Ethiopia) Mekonen Gebrelu (Ethiopia) Reta Tefera |
| October 17 | Ethiopia International; Addis Ababa, Ethiopia; Future Series; 32MS/32WS/16MD/8WD/16XD | (Egypt) Hadia Hosny (Morocco) Rajae Rochdy; 21-8, 21-10 | (Ethiopia) Roza Dilla Mohammed (Ethiopia) Bezawit Tekle Asfaw |
| October 17 | Ethiopia International; Addis Ababa, Ethiopia; Future Series; 32MS/32WS/16MD/8WD/16XD | (Croatia) Luka Zdenjak (Morocco) Rajae Rochdy; 21-16, 21-11 | (Ethiopia) Asnake Sahilu (Ethiopia) Yaekob Ayelech |
| October 24 | French Open; Paris, France; Super Series $200,000 – 32MS/32WS/32MD/32WD/32XD; Draw | (Malaysia) Lee Chong Wei; 21-16, 21-11 | (Japan) Kenichi Tago |
| October 24 | French Open; Paris, France; Super Series $200,000 – 32MS/32WS/32MD/32WD/32XD; Draw | (China) Wang Xin; 21-15, 21-19 | (China) Li Xuerui |
| October 24 | French Open; Paris, France; Super Series $200,000 – 32MS/32WS/32MD/32WD/32XD; Draw | (South Korea) Jung Jae-sung (South Korea) Lee Yong-dae; 14-21, 21-15, 21-11 | (China) Cai Yun (China) Fu Haifeng |
| October 24 | French Open; Paris, France; Super Series $200,000 – 32MS/32WS/32MD/32WD/32XD; Draw | (China) Wang Xiaoli (China) Yu Yang; 26-24, 21-15 | (China) Tian Qing (China) Zhao Yunlei |
| October 24 | French Open; Paris, France; Super Series $200,000 – 32MS/32WS/32MD/32WD/32XD; Draw | (Denmark) Joachim Fischer Nielsen (Denmark) Christinna Pedersen; 21-17, 21-14 | (China) Xu Chen (China) Ma Jin |
| October 24 | Santo Domingo Open; Santo Domingo, Dominican Republic; International Series $5,000 – 64MS/64WS/16MD/16WD/32XD | (Canada) Stephan Wojcikiewicz; 21-17, 21-19 | (United States) Ilian Perez |
| October 24 | Santo Domingo Open; Santo Domingo, Dominican Republic; International Series $5,000 – 64MS/64WS/16MD/16WD/32XD | (Greece) Anne Hald Jensen; 21-13, 21-11 | (Mexico) Victoria Montero |
| October 24 | Santo Domingo Open; Santo Domingo, Dominican Republic; International Series $5,000 – 64MS/64WS/16MD/16WD/32XD | (Jamaica) Gareth Henry (Jamaica) Charles Pyne; 19-21, 21-6, 21-12 | (Canada) Francois Bourret (Canada) Kevin Li |
| October 24 | Santo Domingo Open; Santo Domingo, Dominican Republic; International Series $5,000 – 64MS/64WS/16MD/16WD/32XD | (Greece) Anne Hald Jensen (France) Barbara Matias; 21-8, 21-8 | (Dominican Republic) Orosameli Cabrera (Dominican Republic) Berónica Vibieca |
| October 24 | Santo Domingo Open; Santo Domingo, Dominican Republic; International Series $5,000 – 64MS/64WS/16MD/16WD/32XD | (Spain) José Vicente Martínez (Spain) Sandra Chirlaque; 21-16, 21-8 | (Dominican Republic) William Cabrera (Dominican Republic) Orosameli Cabrera |
| October 24 | Cyprus International; Nicosia, Cyprus; International Series $5,000 – 32MS/32WS/32MD/32WD/32XD | (Denmark) Emil Holst; 21-11, 21-8 | (Hungary) Henrik Toth |
| October 24 | Cyprus International; Nicosia, Cyprus; International Series $5,000 – 32MS/32WS/32MD/32WD/32XD | (Belgium) Lianne Tan; 13-21, 21-18, 18-11 Retired | (Russia) Tatjana Bibik |
| October 24 | Cyprus International; Nicosia, Cyprus; International Series $5,000 – 32MS/32WS/32MD/32WD/32XD | (Denmark) Theis Christiansen (Denmark) Niclas Nøhr; 21-17, 21-13 | (Russia) Nikolaj Nikolaenko (Russia) Nikolai Ukk |
| October 24 | Cyprus International; Nicosia, Cyprus; International Series $5,000 – 32MS/32WS/32MD/32WD/32XD | (Russia) Tatjana Bibik (Russia) Anastasia Chervaykova; 21-12, 21-11 | (Denmark) Celine Juel (Denmark) Josephine van Zaane |
| October 24 | Cyprus International; Nicosia, Cyprus; International Series $5,000 – 32MS/32WS/32MD/32WD/32XD | (Denmark) Niclas Nøhr (Denmark) Joan Christiansen; 23-21, 21-18 | (Russia) Nikolaj Nikolaenko (Russia) Anastasia Chervaykova |
| October 31 | BWF World Junior Championships; Taoyuan City, Chinese Taipei; Suhandinata & EYE Level Cup; 24T/128MS/128WS/64MD/64WD/128XD; Draw | (Malaysia) Malaysia; 3–0 | South Korea |
| October 31 | BWF World Junior Championships; Taoyuan City, Chinese Taipei; Suhandinata & EYE Level Cup; 24T/128MS/128WS/64MD/64WD/128XD; Draw | (Malaysia) Zulfadli Zulkiffli; 21-18, 9-21, 21-19 | (Denmark) Viktor Axelsen |
| October 31 | BWF World Junior Championships; Taoyuan City, Chinese Taipei; Suhandinata & EYE Level Cup; 24T/128MS/128WS/64MD/64WD/128XD; Draw | (Thailand) Ratchanok Inthanon; 21-6, 18-21, 21-13 | (Indonesia) Elyzabeth Purwaningtyas |
| October 31 | BWF World Junior Championships; Taoyuan City, Chinese Taipei; Suhandinata & EYE Level Cup; 24T/128MS/128WS/64MD/64WD/128XD; Draw | (Malaysia) Nelson Heg (Malaysia) Teo Ee Yi; 21-17, 21-17 | (Chinese Taipei) Huang Po-jui (Chinese Taipei) Lin Chia-yu |
| October 31 | BWF World Junior Championships; Taoyuan City, Chinese Taipei; Suhandinata & EYE Level Cup; 24T/128MS/128WS/64MD/64WD/128XD; Draw | (South Korea) Lee So-hee (South Korea) Shin Seung-chan; 21-16, 13-21, 21-9 | (Indonesia) Shella Devi Aulia (Indonesia) Anggia Shitta Awanda |
| October 31 | BWF World Junior Championships; Taoyuan City, Chinese Taipei; Suhandinata & EYE Level Cup; 24T/128MS/128WS/64MD/64WD/128XD; Draw | (Indonesia) Alfian Eko Prasetya (Indonesia) Gloria Emanuelle Widjaja; 12-21, 21-17, 25-23 | (Indonesia) Ronald Alexander (Indonesia) Tiara Rosalia Nuraidah |

=== November ===
| Week of | Tournament | Champions | Runners-up |
|---|---|---|---|
| November 1 | Bitburger Open; Saarbrücken, Germany; Grand Prix Gold $120,000 – 64MS/32WS/32MD/32WD/32XD; Draw | (Denmark) Hans-Kristian Vittinghus; 21-18, 21-10 | (China) Wang Zhengming |
| November 1 | Bitburger Open; Saarbrücken, Germany; Grand Prix Gold $120,000 – 64MS/32WS/32MD/32WD/32XD; Draw | (China) Li Xuerui; 21-8, 21-9 | (Netherlands) Yao Jie |
| November 1 | Bitburger Open; Saarbrücken, Germany; Grand Prix Gold $120,000 – 64MS/32WS/32MD/32WD/32XD; Draw | (Thailand) Bodin Isara (Thailand) Maneepong Jongjit; 21-14, 21-16 | (China) Liu Xiaolong (China) Qiu Zihan |
| November 1 | Bitburger Open; Saarbrücken, Germany; Grand Prix Gold $120,000 – 64MS/32WS/32MD/32WD/32XD; Draw | (Japan) Mizuki Fujii (Japan) Reika Kakiiwa; 21-8, 21–11 | (Sweden) Emelie Lennartsson (Sweden) Emma Wengberg |
| November 1 | Bitburger Open; Saarbrücken, Germany; Grand Prix Gold $120,000 – 64MS/32WS/32MD/32WD/32XD; Draw | (Malaysia) Chan Peng Soon (Malaysia) Goh Liu Ying; 21-18, 14-21, 27-25 | (Denmark) Thomas Laybourn (Denmark) Kamilla Rytter Juhl |
| November 1 | Puerto Rico International; San Juan, Puerto Rico; International Challenge $15,000 – 64MS/32WS/16MD/16WD/16XD | (Sri Lanka) Niluka Karunaratne; 21-18, 21-15 | (Austria) Michael Lahnsteiner |
| November 1 | Puerto Rico International; San Juan, Puerto Rico; International Challenge $15,000 – 64MS/32WS/16MD/16WD/16XD | (Canada) Michelle Li; 21-13, 29-27 | (Greece) Anne Hald Jensen |
| November 1 | Puerto Rico International; San Juan, Puerto Rico; International Challenge $15,000 – 64MS/32WS/16MD/16WD/16XD | (Canada) Adrian Liu (Canada) Derrick Ng; 21-9, 21-16 | (Canada) Francoise Bourret (Canada) Kevin Li |
| November 1 | Puerto Rico International; San Juan, Puerto Rico; International Challenge $15,000 – 64MS/32WS/16MD/16WD/16XD | (Canada) Alex Bruce (Canada) Michelle Li; 24-22, 15-21, 21-11 | (Canada) Grace Gao (Canada) Joycelin Ko |
| November 1 | Puerto Rico International; San Juan, Puerto Rico; International Challenge $15,000 – 64MS/32WS/16MD/16WD/16XD | (Canada) Toby Ng (Canada) Grace Gao; 21-15, 24-22 | (Canada) Adrian Liu (Canada) Joycelin Ko |
| November 1 | Hungarian International; Budapest, Hungary; International Series $5,000 – 64MS/64WS/32MD/32WD/32XD | (Denmark) Rasmus Fladberg; 21-17, 21-10 | (Ukraine) Vitaly Konov |
| November 1 | Hungarian International; Budapest, Hungary; International Series $5,000 – 64MS/64WS/32MD/32WD/32XD | (Bulgaria) Stefani Stoeva; 23-21, 21-14 | (Denmark) Camilla Sorensen |
| November 1 | Hungarian International; Budapest, Hungary; International Series $5,000 – 64MS/64WS/32MD/32WD/32XD | (Croatia) Zvonimir Đurkinjak (Croatia) Zvonimir Hölbling; 21-18, 21-18 | (Poland) Łukasz Moreń (Poland) Wojciech Szkudlarczyk |
| November 1 | Hungarian International; Budapest, Hungary; International Series $5,000 – 64MS/64WS/32MD/32WD/32XD | (Poland) Natalia Pocztowiak (Croatia) Staša Poznanović; 22-20, 20-22, 21-18 | (Poland) Kamila Augustyn (Poland) Agnieszka Wojtkowska |
| November 1 | Hungarian International; Budapest, Hungary; International Series $5,000 – 64MS/64WS/32MD/32WD/32XD | (Indonesia) Indra Viki Okvana (Indonesia) Gustiani Megawati; 21-11, 21-19 | (Poland) Łukasz Moreń (Poland) Natalia Pocztowiak |
| November 7 | Bahrain International; Manama, Bahrain; International Challenge $15,000 – 32MS/32WS/16MD/16WD/16XD | (India) Sourabh Varma; 25-23, 21-12 | (India) H. S. Prannoy |
| November 7 | Bahrain International; Manama, Bahrain; International Challenge $15,000 – 32MS/32WS/16MD/16WD/16XD | (Italy) Agnese Allegrini; 14-21, 21-14, 21-17 | (Switzerland) Sabrina Jaquet |
| November 7 | Bahrain International; Manama, Bahrain; International Challenge $15,000 – 32MS/32WS/16MD/16WD/16XD | (Indonesia) Andrei Adistia (Indonesia) Christopher Rusdianto; 14-21, 21-17, 21-13 | (India) K. T. Rupesh Kumar (India) Sanave Thomas |
| November 7 | Bahrain International; Manama, Bahrain; International Challenge $15,000 – 32MS/32WS/16MD/16WD/16XD | (Canada) Nicole Grether (Canada) Charmaine Reid; 21-10, 21-19 | (India) Aparna Balan (India) N. Sikki Reddy |
| November 7 | Bahrain International; Manama, Bahrain; International Challenge $15,000 – 32MS/32WS/16MD/16WD/16XD | (Ukraine) Valeriy Atrashchenkov (Ukraine) Anna Kobceva; 21-19, 15-21, 22-20 | (Switzerland) Anthony Dumartheray (Switzerland) Sabrina Jaquet |
| November 7 | Miami International; Miami Lakes, United States; International Series $5,000 – 64MS/32WS/16MD/8WD/16XD | (Sri Lanka) Niluka Karunaratne; 21-12, 21-14 | (Peru) Rodrigo Pacheco |
| November 7 | Miami International; Miami Lakes, United States; International Series $5,000 – 64MS/32WS/16MD/8WD/16XD | (Greece) Anne Hald Jensen; 21-9, 21-9 | (Mexico) Victoria Montero |
| November 7 | Miami International; Miami Lakes, United States; International Series $5,000 – 64MS/32WS/16MD/8WD/16XD | (Brazil) Hugo Arthuso (Brazil) Daniel Paiola; 21-16, 18-21, 21-9 | (United States) Phillip Chew (United States) Sattawat Pongnairat |
| November 7 | Miami International; Miami Lakes, United States; International Series $5,000 – 64MS/32WS/16MD/8WD/16XD | (Brazil) Lohaynny Vicente (Brazil) Luana Vicente; 21-9, 21-16 | (United States) Dayanis Alvarez (United States) Shannon Pohl |
| November 7 | Miami International; Miami Lakes, United States; International Series $5,000 – 64MS/32WS/16MD/8WD/16XD | (United States) Phillip Chew (United States) Paula Lynn Obañana; 21-18, 17-21, 21-10 | (Sri Lanka) Lasitha Karunathilake (Sri Lanka) Renu Chandrika Hettiarachchige |
| November 7 | Iceland International; Reykjavík, Iceland; International Series $5,000 – 32MS/32WS/16MD/16WD/16XD | (Sweden) Mattias Borg; 21-18, 21-17 | (Republic of Ireland) Tony Stephenson |
| November 7 | Iceland International; Reykjavík, Iceland; International Series $5,000 – 32MS/32WS/16MD/16WD/16XD | (Iceland) Ragna Ingólfsdóttir; 21-18, 17-21, 21-17 | (Lithuania) Akvilė Stapušaitytė |
| November 7 | Iceland International; Reykjavík, Iceland; International Series $5,000 – 32MS/32WS/16MD/16WD/16XD | (Denmark) Thomas Dew-Hattens (Denmark) Mathias Kany; 16-21, 21-12, 21-16 | (Iceland) Magnús Ingi Helgason (Iceland) Helgi Jóhannesson |
| November 7 | Iceland International; Reykjavík, Iceland; International Series $5,000 – 32MS/32WS/16MD/16WD/16XD | (Iceland) Tinna Helgadóttir (Iceland) Snjólaug Jóhannsdóttir; 11-4 Retired | (Denmark) Celilie Nystrup Wegener Clausen (Denmark) Fie S. Christensen |
| November 7 | Iceland International; Reykjavík, Iceland; International Series $5,000 – 32MS/32WS/16MD/16WD/16XD | (Denmark) Thomas Dew-Hattens (Denmark) Louise Hansen; 23-21, 21-13 | (Republic of Ireland) Tony Stephenson (Republic of Ireland) Sinnead Chambers |
| November 14 | Hong Kong Open; Kowloon, Hong Kong; Super Series $250,000 – 32MS/32WS/32MD/32WD/32XD; Draw | (China) Lin Dan; 21-12, 21-19 | (China) Chen Jin |
| November 14 | Hong Kong Open; Kowloon, Hong Kong; Super Series $250,000 – 32MS/32WS/32MD/32WD/32XD; Draw | (China) Wang Xin; 21-17, 21-14 | (Denmark) Tine Baun |
| November 14 | Hong Kong Open; Kowloon, Hong Kong; Super Series $250,000 – 32MS/32WS/32MD/32WD/32XD; Draw | (China) Cai Yun (China) Fu Haifeng; 14-21, 24-22, 21-19 | (South Korea) Jung Jae-sung (South Korea) Lee Yong-dae |
| November 14 | Hong Kong Open; Kowloon, Hong Kong; Super Series $250,000 – 32MS/32WS/32MD/32WD/32XD; Draw | (China) Wang Xiaoli (China) Yu Yang; 21-12, 14-2 Retired | (China) Tian Qing (China) Zhao Yunlei |
| November 14 | Hong Kong Open; Kowloon, Hong Kong; Super Series $250,000 – 32MS/32WS/32MD/32WD/32XD; Draw | (China) Zhang Nan (China) Zhao Yunlei; 15-21, 21-17, 21-17 | (Denmark) Joachim Fischer Nielsen (Denmark) Christinna Pedersen |
| November 14 | Norwegian International; Oslo, Norway; International Challenge $15,000 – 32MS/32WS/32MD/16WD/32XD | (Finland) Ville Lång; 19-21, 21-11, 21-10 | (Denmark) Emil Holst |
| November 14 | Norwegian International; Oslo, Norway; International Challenge $15,000 – 32MS/32WS/32MD/16WD/32XD | (Bulgaria) Linda Zetchiri; 21-19, 21-14 | (Republic of Ireland) Chloe Magee |
| November 14 | Norwegian International; Oslo, Norway; International Challenge $15,000 – 32MS/32WS/32MD/16WD/32XD | (Denmark) Rasmus Bonde (Denmark) Anders Kristiansen; 21-17, 21-18 | (Poland) Adam Cwalina (Poland) Michał Łogosz |
| November 14 | Norwegian International; Oslo, Norway; International Challenge $15,000 – 32MS/32WS/32MD/16WD/32XD | (United States) Eva Lee (United States) Paula Lynn Obañana; 17-21, 21-6, 21-13 | (Netherlands) Lotte Jonathans (Netherlands) Paulien van Dooremalen |
| November 14 | Norwegian International; Oslo, Norway; International Challenge $15,000 – 32MS/32WS/32MD/16WD/32XD | (Republic of Ireland) Sam Magee (Republic of Ireland) Chloe Magee; 21-17, 21-16 | (Denmark) Rasmus Bonde (Denmark) Maria Helsbøl |
| November 21 | China Open; Shanghai, China; Super Series Premier $350,000 – 32MS/32WS/32MD/32WD/32XD; Draw | (China) Lin Dan; 21-17, 26-24 | (China) Chen Long |
| November 21 | China Open; Shanghai, China; Super Series Premier $350,000 – 32MS/32WS/32MD/32WD/32XD; Draw | (China) Wang Yihan; 18-12 Retired | (China) Wang Xin |
| November 21 | China Open; Shanghai, China; Super Series Premier $350,000 – 32MS/32WS/32MD/32WD/32XD; Draw | (Denmark) Mathias Boe (Denmark) Carsten Mogensen; 21-17, 21-13 | (South Korea) Ko Sung-hyun (South Korea) Yoo Yeon-seong |
| November 21 | China Open; Shanghai, China; Super Series Premier $350,000 – 32MS/32WS/32MD/32WD/32XD; Draw | (China) Wang Xiaoli (China) Yu Yang; 21-11, 21-10 | (China) Tang Jinhua (China) Xia Huan |
| November 21 | China Open; Shanghai, China; Super Series Premier $350,000 – 32MS/32WS/32MD/32WD/32XD; Draw | (China) Zhang Nan (China) Zhao Yunlei; 21-11, 21-14 | (Denmark) Joachim Fischer Nielsen (Denmark) Christinna Pedersen |
| November 21 | Malaysia International; Sandakan, Malaysia; International Challenge $15,000 – 64MS/32WS/32MD/32WD/32XD | (Indonesia) Alamsyah Yunus; 21-12, 17-21, 21-14 | (Malaysia) Mohamad Arif Abdul Latif |
| November 21 | Malaysia International; Sandakan, Malaysia; International Challenge $15,000 – 64MS/32WS/32MD/32WD/32XD | (Indonesia) Bellaetrix Manuputty; 21-19, 19-21, 21-12 | (Indonesia) Hera Desi |
| November 21 | Malaysia International; Sandakan, Malaysia; International Challenge $15,000 – 64MS/32WS/32MD/32WD/32XD | (Japan) Takeshi Kamura (Japan) Keigo Sonoda; 21-13, 21-17 | (Chinese Taipei) Chen Chung-jen (Chinese Taipei) Lin Yen-jui |
| November 21 | Malaysia International; Sandakan, Malaysia; International Challenge $15,000 – 64MS/32WS/32MD/32WD/32XD | (Japan) Naoko Fukuman (Japan) Kurumi Yonao; 21-16, 21-13 | (Malaysia) Lim Yin Loo (Malaysia) Marylen Ng |
| November 21 | Malaysia International; Sandakan, Malaysia; International Challenge $15,000 – 64MS/32WS/32MD/32WD/32XD | (Malaysia) Tan Aik Quan (Malaysia) Lai Pei Jing; 21-18, 21-17 | (Indonesia) Andhika Anhar (Indonesia) Keshya Nurvita Hanadia |
| November 21 | Scottish International; Glasgow, Scotland; International Challenge $15,000 – 64MS/64WS/32MD/32WD/32XD | (England) Rajiv Ouseph; 21-18, 21-10 | (England) Carl Baxter |
| November 21 | Scottish International; Glasgow, Scotland; International Challenge $15,000 – 64MS/64WS/32MD/32WD/32XD | (Netherlands) Judith Meulendijks; 21-9, 21-19 | (Denmark) Line Kjærsfeldt |
| November 21 | Scottish International; Glasgow, Scotland; International Challenge $15,000 – 64MS/64WS/32MD/32WD/32XD | (Russia) Vladimir Ivanov (Russia) Ivan Sozonov; 21-19, 21-19 | (England) Marcus Ellis (England) Peter Mills |
| November 21 | Scottish International; Glasgow, Scotland; International Challenge $15,000 – 64MS/64WS/32MD/32WD/32XD | (Sweden) Emelie Lennartsson (Sweden) Emma Wengberg; 21-7, 21-13 | (Malaysia) Ng Hui Ern (Malaysia) Ng Hui Lin |
| November 21 | Scottish International; Glasgow, Scotland; International Challenge $15,000 – 64MS/64WS/32MD/32WD/32XD | (Denmark) Kim Astrup (Denmark) Line Kjærsfeldt; 15-21, 21-15, 21-13 | (Poland) Wojciech Szkudlarczyk (Poland) Agnieszka Wojtkowska |
| November 21 | Suriname International; Paramaribo, Suriname; International Series $5,000 – 32MS/32WS/8MD/8WD/16XD | (Portugal) Pedro Martins; 14-21, 21-16, 21-18 | (Austria) Michael Lahnsteiner |
| November 21 | Suriname International; Paramaribo, Suriname; International Series $5,000 – 32MS/32WS/8MD/8WD/16XD | (Turkey) Neslihan Yiğit; 21-16, 23-21 | (Turkey) Özge Bayrak |
| November 21 | Suriname International; Paramaribo, Suriname; International Series $5,000 – 32MS/32WS/8MD/8WD/16XD | (Suriname) Mitchel Wongsodikromo (Suriname) Virgil Soeroredjo; 21-14, 21-17 | (Brazil) Luiz Henrique dos Santos jr. (Brazil) Alex Tjong |
| November 21 | Suriname International; Paramaribo, Suriname; International Series $5,000 – 32MS/32WS/8MD/8WD/16XD | (Turkey) Özge Bayrak (Turkey) Neslihan Yiğit; 21-3, 21-7 | (Suriname) Crystal Leefmans (Suriname) Rugshaar Ishaak |
| November 21 | Suriname International; Paramaribo, Suriname; International Series $5,000 – 32MS/32WS/8MD/8WD/16XD | (Brazil) Hugo Arthuso (Brazil) Fabiana Silva; 22-20, 21-18 | (Suriname) Mitchel Wongsodikromo (Suriname) Crystal Leefmans |
| November 21 | Botswana International; Gaborone, Botswana; International Series $5,000 – 64MS/32WS/32MD/16WD/32XD | (Uganda) Edwin Ekiring; 10-21, 21-16, 22-20 | (Israel) Misha Zilberman |
| November 21 | Botswana International; Gaborone, Botswana; International Series $5,000 – 64MS/32WS/32MD/16WD/32XD | (Austria) Claudia Mayer; 21-18, 21-12 | (Nigeria) Grace Gabriel |
| November 21 | Botswana International; Gaborone, Botswana; International Series $5,000 – 64MS/32WS/32MD/16WD/32XD | (Nigeria) Jinkan Ifraimu (Nigeria) Ola Fagbemi; 23-21, 13-21, 21-15 | (South Africa) Dorian James (South Africa) Willem Viljoen |
| November 21 | Botswana International; Gaborone, Botswana; International Series $5,000 – 64MS/32WS/32MD/16WD/32XD | (South Africa) Michelle Edwards (South Africa) Annari Viljoen; 21-12, 21-14 | (South Africa) Michelle Butler-Emmett (South Africa) Stacey Doubell |
| November 21 | Botswana International; Gaborone, Botswana; International Series $5,000 – 64MS/32WS/32MD/16WD/32XD | (South Africa) Dorian James (South Africa) Michelle Edwards; 21-16, 11-21, 21-19 | (Nigeria) Ola Fagbemi (Nigeria) Susan Ideh |
| November 28 | Macau Open; Macau; Grand Prix Gold $200,000 – 64MS/32WS/32MD/32WD/32XD; Draw | (South Korea) Lee Hyun-il; 17-21, 21-11, 21-18 | (China) Du Pengyu |
| November 28 | Macau Open; Macau; Grand Prix Gold $200,000 – 64MS/32WS/32MD/32WD/32XD; Draw | (China) Wang Shixian; 21-14, 21-14 | (China) Han Li |
| November 28 | Macau Open; Macau; Grand Prix Gold $200,000 – 64MS/32WS/32MD/32WD/32XD; Draw | (China) Chai Biao (China) Guo Zhendong; 21-19, 21-19 | (South Korea) Ko Sung-hyun (South Korea) Yoo Yeon-seong |
| November 28 | Macau Open; Macau; Grand Prix Gold $200,000 – 64MS/32WS/32MD/32WD/32XD; Draw | (South Korea) Jung Kyung-eun (South Korea) Kim Ha-na; 8-4 Retired | (South Korea) Eom Hye-won (South Korea) Chang Ye-na |
| November 28 | Macau Open; Macau; Grand Prix Gold $200,000 – 64MS/32WS/32MD/32WD/32XD; Draw | (Indonesia) Tontowi Ahmad (Indonesia) Liliyana Natsir; Walkover | (Chinese Taipei) Chen Hung-ling (Chinese Taipei) Cheng Wen-hsing |

=== December ===
| Week of | Tournament | Champions | Runners-up |
|---|---|---|---|
| December 1 | Welsh International; Cardiff, Wales; International Series $5,000 – 32MS/32WS/32MD/32WD/32XD | (Sri Lanka) Niluka Karunaratne; 21-16, 18-21, 21-19 | (Malaysia) Lok Chong Chieh |
| December 1 | Welsh International; Cardiff, Wales; International Series $5,000 – 32MS/32WS/32MD/32WD/32XD | (Switzerland) Nicole Schaller; 3-1 Retired | (Iceland) Ragna Ingólfsdóttir |
| December 1 | Welsh International; Cardiff, Wales; International Series $5,000 – 32MS/32WS/32MD/32WD/32XD | (England) Christopher Coles (England) Matthew Nottingham; 21-19, 21-7 | (Scotland) Martin Campbell (Scotland) Angus Gilmour |
| December 1 | Welsh International; Cardiff, Wales; International Series $5,000 – 32MS/32WS/32MD/32WD/32XD | (Malaysia) Ng Hui Ern (Malaysia) Ng Hui Lin; 21-16, 21-14 | (England) Alexandra Langley (England) Lauren Smith |
| December 1 | Welsh International; Cardiff, Wales; International Series $5,000 – 32MS/32WS/32MD/32WD/32XD | (Scotland) Martin Campbell (Malaysia) Ng Hui Lin; 21-16, 21-19 | (England) Peter Briggs (Malaysia) Ng Hui Ern |
| December 1 | Internacional Mexicano; Nuevo Vallarta, Mexico; International Series $5,000 – 32MS/16WS/8MD/8WD/8XD | (Peru) Rodrigo Pacheco; 21-19, 21-13 | (Scotland) Alistair Casey |
| December 1 | Internacional Mexicano; Nuevo Vallarta, Mexico; International Series $5,000 – 32MS/16WS/8MD/8WD/8XD | (Mexico) Victoria Montero; No match | (Slovakia) Monika Fašungová |
| December 1 | Internacional Mexicano; Nuevo Vallarta, Mexico; International Series $5,000 – 32MS/16WS/8MD/8WD/8XD | (Mexico) Lino Muñoz (Mexico) Andrés López; 15-21, 21-14, 21-18 | (Brazil) Luíz dos Santos Júnior (Brazil) Alex Yuwan Tjong |
| December 1 | Internacional Mexicano; Nuevo Vallarta, Mexico; International Series $5,000 – 32MS/16WS/8MD/8WD/8XD | (Brazil) Lohaynny Vicente (Brazil) Luana Vicente; 21–10, 21-19 | (Mexico) Cynthia González (Mexico) Victoria Montero |
| December 1 | Internacional Mexicano; Nuevo Vallarta, Mexico; International Series $5,000 – 32MS/16WS/8MD/8WD/8XD | (Mexico) Andrés López (Mexico) Victoria Montero; 21-19, 20-22, 21-14 | (Mexico) Lino Muñoz (Mexico) Cynthia González |
| December 1 | South Africa International; Pretoria, South Africa; International Series $5,000 – 64MS/32WS/16MD/16WD/32XD | (Portugal) Pedro Martins; 21-15, 21-18 | (Uganda) Edwin Ekiring |
| December 1 | South Africa International; Pretoria, South Africa; International Series $5,000 – 64MS/32WS/16MD/16WD/32XD | (Turkey) Özge Bayrak; 21-19, 21-10 | (Portugal) Telma Santos |
| December 1 | South Africa International; Pretoria, South Africa; International Series $5,000 – 64MS/32WS/16MD/16WD/32XD | (South Africa) Dorian James (South Africa) Willem Viljoen; 21-19, 21-18 | (South Africa) Chris Dednam (South Africa) Enrico James |
| December 1 | South Africa International; Pretoria, South Africa; International Series $5,000 – 64MS/32WS/16MD/16WD/32XD | (Turkey) Özge Bayrak (Turkey) Neslihan Yiğit; 21-10, 21-15 | (South Africa) Michelle Claire Edwards (South Africa) Annari Viljoen |
| December 1 | South Africa International; Pretoria, South Africa; International Series $5,000 – 64MS/32WS/16MD/16WD/32XD | (South Africa) Chris Dednam (South Africa) Annari Viljoen; 22-20, 11-21, 21-14 | (South Africa) Enrico James (South Africa) Stacey Doubell |
| December 5 | Korea Masters; Hwasun-gun, Jeonnam, South Korea; Grand Prix Gold $120,000 – 64MS/32WS/32MD/32WD/32XD; Draw | (South Korea) Lee Hyun-il; 21-18, 21-16 | (South Korea) Son Wan-ho |
| December 5 | Korea Masters; Hwasun-gun, Jeonnam, South Korea; Grand Prix Gold $120,000 – 64MS/32WS/32MD/32WD/32XD; Draw | (South Korea) Sung Ji-hyun; 21-18, 21-16 | (China) Han Li |
| December 5 | Korea Masters; Hwasun-gun, Jeonnam, South Korea; Grand Prix Gold $120,000 – 64MS/32WS/32MD/32WD/32XD; Draw | (South Korea) Ko Sung-hyun (South Korea) Yoo Yeon-seong; 21-15, 22-24 | (South Korea) Jung Jae-sung (South Korea) Lee Yong-dae |
| December 5 | Korea Masters; Hwasun-gun, Jeonnam, South Korea; Grand Prix Gold $120,000 – 64MS/32WS/32MD/32WD/32XD; Draw | (South Korea) Eom Hye-won (South Korea) Chang Ye-na; 21-15, 21-16 | (Singapore) Shinta Mulia Sari (Singapore) Yao Lei |
| December 5 | Korea Masters; Hwasun-gun, Jeonnam, South Korea; Grand Prix Gold $120,000 – 64MS/32WS/32MD/32WD/32XD; Draw | (South Korea) Yoo Yeon-seong (South Korea) Chang Ye-na; 21-17, 21-19 | (South Korea) Kim Gi-jung (South Korea) Jung Kyung-eun |
| December 5 | Bangladesh International; Dhaka, Bangladesh; International Series $5,000 – 64MS/16WS/16MD/8WD/8XD | (Indonesia) Alrie Guna Dharma; 21-17, 21-18 | (Italy) Rosario Maddaloni |
| December 5 | Bangladesh International; Dhaka, Bangladesh; International Series $5,000 – 64MS/16WS/16MD/8WD/8XD | (Sri Lanka) Achini Ratnasiri; 21-11, 11-21, 21-16 | (Vietnam) Lê Thu Huyền |
| December 5 | Bangladesh International; Dhaka, Bangladesh; International Series $5,000 – 64MS/16WS/16MD/8WD/8XD | (India) Tarun Kona (India) Arun Vishnu; 21-7, 22-20 | (Vietnam) Bùi Bằng Đức (Vietnam) Đào Mạnh Thắng |
| December 5 | Bangladesh International; Dhaka, Bangladesh; International Series $5,000 – 64MS/16WS/16MD/8WD/8XD | (Sri Lanka) Achini Ratnasiri (Sri Lanka) Upuli Weerasinghe; 21-7, 21-11 | (Bangladesh) Mst Rehana Parvin (Bangladesh) Nigar Sultana |
| December 5 | Bangladesh International; Dhaka, Bangladesh; International Series $5,000 – 64MS/16WS/16MD/8WD/8XD | (Vietnam) Lê Hà Anh (Vietnam) Lê Thu Huyền; 21-18, 21-15 | (Sri Lanka) Hasitha Chanaka (Sri Lanka) Thilini Jayasinghe |
| December 5 | Irish International; Lisburn, Northern Ireland; International Challenge $15,000 – 32MS/32WS/32MD/32WD/32XD | (England) Rajiv Ouseph; 21-15, 11-5 Retired | (Poland) Przemysław Wacha |
| December 5 | Irish International; Lisburn, Northern Ireland; International Challenge $15,000 – 32MS/32WS/32MD/32WD/32XD | (Chinese Taipei) Pai Hsiao-ma; 12-21, 21-19, 21-7 | (Spain) Carolina Marín |
| December 5 | Irish International; Lisburn, Northern Ireland; International Challenge $15,000 – 32MS/32WS/32MD/32WD/32XD | (Poland) Adam Cwalina (Poland) Michał Łogosz; 21-15, 21-15 | (England) Marcus Ellis (England) Peter Mills |
| December 5 | Irish International; Lisburn, Northern Ireland; International Challenge $15,000 – 32MS/32WS/32MD/32WD/32XD | (Malaysia) Ng Hui Ern (Malaysia) Ng Hui Lin; 14-21, 21-16, 21-11 | (England) Mariana Agathangelou (England) Heather Olver |
| December 5 | Irish International; Lisburn, Northern Ireland; International Challenge $15,000 – 32MS/32WS/32MD/32WD/32XD | (England) Marcus Ellis (England) Heather Olver; 21-19, 21-17 | (Netherlands) Dave Khodabux (Netherlands) Selena Piek |
| December 12 | Canadian International; Moncton, Canada; International Challenge $15,000 – 32MS/32WS/16MD/16WD/16XD | (England) Carl Baxter; 21-19, 21-13 | (Austria) Michael Lahnsteiner |
| December 12 | Canadian International; Moncton, Canada; International Challenge $15,000 – 32MS/32WS/16MD/16WD/16XD | (Canada) Michelle Li; 21-14, 21-11 | (Belgium) Lianne Tan |
| December 12 | Canadian International; Moncton, Canada; International Challenge $15,000 – 32MS/32WS/16MD/16WD/16XD | (Canada) Adrian Liu (Canada) Derrick Ng; 21-7, 21-15 | (Brazil) Hugo Arthuso (Brazil) Daniel Paiola |
| December 12 | Canadian International; Moncton, Canada; International Challenge $15,000 – 32MS/32WS/16MD/16WD/16XD | (Canada) Alex Bruce (Canada) Michelle Li; 21-10, 13-21, 21-16 | (Canada) Nicole Grether (Canada) Charmaine Reid |
| December 12 | Canadian International; Moncton, Canada; International Challenge $15,000 – 32MS/32WS/16MD/16WD/16XD | (Canada) Toby Ng (Canada) Grace Gao; 21-15, 21-19 | (Canada) Derrick Ng (Canada) Alex Bruce |
| December 12 | Italian International; Rome, Italy; International Challenge $15,000 – 32MS/32WS/32MD/32WD/32XD | (Spain) Pablo Abián; 13-21, 21-14, 21-13 | (Finland) Ville Lång |
| December 12 | Italian International; Rome, Italy; International Challenge $15,000 – 32MS/32WS/32MD/32WD/32XD | (Netherlands) Yao Jie; 21-11, 21-17 | (Bulgaria) Petya Nedelcheva |
| December 12 | Italian International; Rome, Italy; International Challenge $15,000 – 32MS/32WS/32MD/32WD/32XD | (Russia) Vladimir Ivanov (Russia) Ivan Sozonov; 21-16, 21-15 | (Russia) Vitalij Durkin (Russia) Aleksandr Nikolaenko |
| December 12 | Italian International; Rome, Italy; International Challenge $15,000 – 32MS/32WS/32MD/32WD/32XD | (Russia) Valeria Sorokina (Russia) Nina Vislova; 21-14, 21-9 | (Germany) Sandra Marinello (Germany) Birgit Michels |
| December 12 | Italian International; Rome, Italy; International Challenge $15,000 – 32MS/32WS/32MD/32WD/32XD | (Russia) Aleksandr Nikolaenko (Russia) Valeria Sorokina; 13-21, 21-18, 21-17 | (Russia) Vitalij Durkin (Russia) Nina Vislova |
| December 12 | Tata Open India International; Mumbai, India; International Challenge $15,000 – 32MS/32WS/16MD/8WD/16XD | (Indonesia) Alamsyah Yunus; 21-17, 24-22 | (India) R. M. V. Gurusaidutt |
| December 12 | Tata Open India International; Mumbai, India; International Challenge $15,000 – 32MS/32WS/16MD/8WD/16XD | (India) P. V. Sindhu; 21-10, 20-22, 21-11 | (India) Sayali Gokhale |
| December 12 | Tata Open India International; Mumbai, India; International Challenge $15,000 – 32MS/32WS/16MD/8WD/16XD | (India) Pranav Chopra (India) Akshay Dewalkar; 19-21, 21-17, 23-21 | (India) K. T. Rupesh Kumar (India) Sanave Thomas |
| December 12 | Tata Open India International; Mumbai, India; International Challenge $15,000 – 32MS/32WS/16MD/8WD/16XD | (Indonesia) Della Destiara Haris (Indonesia) Suci Rizky Andini; 23-21, 21-13 | (Indonesia) Gebby Ristiyani Imawan (Indonesia) Tiara Rosalia Nuraidah |
| December 12 | Tata Open India International; Mumbai, India; International Challenge $15,000 – 32MS/32WS/16MD/8WD/16XD | (Indonesia) Fran Kurniawan (Indonesia) Shendy Puspa Irawati; 21-15, 21-15 | (Indonesia) Riky Widianto (Indonesia) Richi Puspita Dili |
| December 12 | Superseries Finals; Liuzhou, China; BWF Super Series Finals $500,000 – 8MS (RR)/8WS (RR)/8MD (RR)/8WD (RR)/8XD (RR); Draw | (China) Lin Dan; 21-12, 21-16 | (China) Chen Long |
| December 12 | Superseries Finals; Liuzhou, China; BWF Super Series Finals $500,000 – 8MS (RR)/8WS (RR)/8MD (RR)/8WD (RR)/8XD (RR); Draw | (China) Wang Yihan; 18-21, 21-13, 21-13 | (India) Saina Nehwal |
| December 12 | Superseries Finals; Liuzhou, China; BWF Super Series Finals $500,000 – 8MS (RR)/8WS (RR)/8MD (RR)/8WD (RR)/8XD (RR); Draw | (Denmark) Mathias Boe (Denmark) Carsten Mogensen; 25-23, 21-7 | (China) Chai Biao (China) Guo Zhendong |
| December 12 | Superseries Finals; Liuzhou, China; BWF Super Series Finals $500,000 – 8MS (RR)/8WS (RR)/8MD (RR)/8WD (RR)/8XD (RR); Draw | (China) Wang Xiaoli (China) Yu Yang; 21-8, 21-12 | (South Korea) Ha Jung-eun (South Korea) Kim Min-jung |
| December 12 | Superseries Finals; Liuzhou, China; BWF Super Series Finals $500,000 – 8MS (RR)/8WS (RR)/8MD (RR)/8WD (RR)/8XD (RR); Draw | (China) Zhang Nan (China) Zhao Yunlei; 21-13, 21-15 | (China) Xu Chen (China) Ma Jin |
| December 19 | Turkey International; Istanbul, Turkey; International Challenge $15,000 – 32MS/32WS/16MD/16WD/16XD | (South Korea) Hong Ji-hoon; 22-24, 21-12, 21-16 | (Malaysia) Tan Chun Seang |
| December 19 | Turkey International; Istanbul, Turkey; International Challenge $15,000 – 32MS/32WS/16MD/16WD/16XD | (Bulgaria) Petya Nedelcheva; Walkover | (Greece) Anne Hald Jensen |
| December 19 | Turkey International; Istanbul, Turkey; International Challenge $15,000 – 32MS/32WS/16MD/16WD/16XD | (South Korea) Kim Gi-jung (South Korea) Kim Sa-rang; 21-17, 16-21, 21-15 | (South Korea) Cho Gun-woo (South Korea) Shin Baek-choel |
| December 19 | Turkey International; Istanbul, Turkey; International Challenge $15,000 – 32MS/32WS/16MD/16WD/16XD | (Germany) Sandra Marinello (Germany) Birgit Michels; 21-18, 18-21, 24-22 | (South Korea) Choi A-reum (South Korea) Yoo Hyun-young |
| December 19 | Turkey International; Istanbul, Turkey; International Challenge $15,000 – 32MS/32WS/16MD/16WD/16XD | (South Korea) Cho Gun-woo (South Korea) Yoo Hyun-young; 23-25, 21-9, 21-19 | (South Korea) Kim Sa-rang (South Korea) Lee So-hee |
| December 19 | Syed Modi India Open; Lucknow, India; Grand Prix Gold $120,000 – 64MS/32WS/32MD/32WD/32XD; Draw | (Indonesia) Taufik Hidayat; 21-15, 21-18 | (India) Sourabh Varma |
| December 19 | Syed Modi India Open; Lucknow, India; Grand Prix Gold $120,000 – 64MS/32WS/32MD/32WD/32XD; Draw | (Thailand) Ratchanok Intanon; Walkover | (Thailand) Porntip Buranaprasertsuk |
| December 19 | Syed Modi India Open; Lucknow, India; Grand Prix Gold $120,000 – 64MS/32WS/32MD/32WD/32XD; Draw | (Japan) Naoki Kawamae (Japan) Shoji Sato; 21-17, 12-21, 23-21 | (Indonesia) Andrei Adistia (Indonesia) Christopher Rusdianto |
| December 19 | Syed Modi India Open; Lucknow, India; Grand Prix Gold $120,000 – 64MS/32WS/32MD/32WD/32XD; Draw | (Singapore) Shinta Mulia Sari (Singapore) Yao Lei; 21-17, 21-18 | (Japan) Miyuki Maeda (Japan) Satoko Suetsuna |
| December 19 | Syed Modi India Open; Lucknow, India; Grand Prix Gold $120,000 – 64MS/32WS/32MD/32WD/32XD; Draw | (Thailand) Sudket Prapakamol (Thailand) Saralee Thungthongkam; 16-21, 21-18, 21-11 | (Indonesia) Muhammad Rizal (Indonesia) Debby Susanto |
| December 26 | Copenhagen Masters; Frederiksberg, Copenhagen Denmark; Others (Invitation); 2MS/4WS/4MD/4XD | (Denmark) Jan Ø. Jørgensen; 14-21, 25-23, 22-20 | (Denmark) Peter Gade |
| December 26 | Copenhagen Masters; Frederiksberg, Copenhagen Denmark; Others (Invitation); 2MS/4WS/4MD/4XD | (Thailand) Ratchanok Intanon; 21-17, 21-15 | (Denmark) Tine Baun |
| December 26 | Copenhagen Masters; Frederiksberg, Copenhagen Denmark; Others (Invitation); 2MS/4WS/4MD/4XD | (Denmark) Mathias Boe (Denmark) Carsten Mogensen; 21-18, 21-9 | (Malaysia) Mohd Zakry Abdul Latif (Malaysia) Mohd Fairuzizuan Mohd Tazari |
| December 26 | Copenhagen Masters; Frederiksberg, Copenhagen Denmark; Others (Invitation); 2MS/4WS/4MD/4XD | (Denmark) Joachim Fischer Nielsen (Denmark) Christinna Pedersen; 21-13, 21-17 | (Thailand) Sudket Prapakamol (Thailand) Saralee Thungthongkam |
