= Stacey Doubell =

South African badminton player (born 1987)

Stacey Kerr (Doubell)
Personal information
- Born: 23 March 1987 (age 39)

Sport
- Country: South Africa
- Sport: Badminton

Women's singles & doubles
- Highest ranking: 106 (WS 24 November 2011); 108 (WD 16 August 2012); 144 (XD 17 May 2012)
- BWF profile
Medal record
Women's badminton
Representing South Africa
All-Africa Games
Gold medal – first place	2011 Maputo	Women's doubles
Silver medal – second place	2007 Algiers	Mixed team
Silver medal – second place	2011 Maputo	Mixed team
Bronze medal – third place	2007 Algiers	Women's singles
Bronze medal – third place	2007 Algiers	Women's doubles
Bronze medal – third place	2011 Maputo	Women's singles
Bronze medal – third place	2011 Maputo	Mixed doubles
African Championships
Gold medal – first place	2006 Algiers	Women's doubles
Gold medal – first place	2011 Marrakesh	Women's singles
Silver medal – second place	2006 Algiers	Women's singles
Silver medal – second place	2009 Nairobi	Women's singles
Silver medal – second place	2009 Nairobi	Women's doubles
Silver medal – second place	2010 Kampala	Women's singles
Silver medal – second place	2012 Addis Ababa	Mixed doubles
Bronze medal – third place	2007 Rose-Hill	Women's singles
Bronze medal – third place	2007 Rose-Hill	Women's doubles
Bronze medal – third place	2009 Nairobi	Mixed doubles
Bronze medal – third place	2012 Addis Ababa	Women's singles
Bronze medal – third place	2012 Addis Ababa	Women's doubles
Africa Team Championships
Gold medal – first place	2008 Rose Hill	Women's team
Gold medal – first place	2010 Kampala	Women's team
Gold medal – first place	2012 Addis Ababa	Women's team

Stacey Doubell (born 23 March 1987) is a South African retired badminton player.

== Career ==
In 2011, she won gold medal in women's doubles event, silver medal in mixed team event and bronze medals in women's singles and mixed doubles events at the African Games in Maputo, Mozambique. In 2015, she became the runner-up of South Africa International tournament in women's doubles event.

== Achievements ==
=== All-Africa Games ===
Women's singles
Year	Venue	Opponent	Score	Result
2007	Salle OMS El Biar, Algiers, Algeria			Bronze
2011	Escola Josina Machel, Maputo, Mozambique	(Nigeria) Grace Gabriel	16–21, 16–21	Bronze

Women's doubles
Year	Venue	Partner	Opponent	Score	Result
2007	Salle OMS El Biar; Algiers, Algeria	(South Africa) Kerry-Lee Harrington			Bronze
2011	Escola Josina Machel; Maputo, Mozambique	(South Africa) Annari Viljoen	(Seychelles) Allisen Camille (Seychelles) Cynthia Course	21–18, 21–15	Gold

Mixed doubles
Year	Venue	Partner	Opponent	Score	Result
2011	Escola Josina Machel; Maputo, Mozambique	(South Africa) Enrico James	(Seychelles) Georgie Cupidon (Seychelles) Allisen Camille	19–21, 15–21	Bronze

=== African Championships ===
Women's singles
Year	Venue	Opponent	Score	Result
2006	Salle OMS El Biar, Algiers, Algeria	(Seychelles) Juliette Ah-Wan	10–21, 12–21	Silver
2007	Stadium National Badminton Centre, Rose Hill, Mauritius	(Nigeria) Grace Daniel	7–21, 11–21	Bronze
2009	Moi International Sports Complex, Nairobi, Kenya	(Seychelles) Juliette Ah-Wan	15–21, 7–21	Silver
2010	Sharing Youth Center, Kampala, Uganda	(Egypt) Hadia Hosny	17–21, 12–21	Silver
2011	Marrakesh, Morocco	(South Africa) Kerry-Lee Harrington	21–18, 21–16	Gold
2012	Arat Kilo Hall, Addis Ababa, Ethiopia	(Nigeria) Grace Gabriel	13–21, 21–23	Bronze

Women's doubles
Year	Venue	Partner	Opponent	Score	Result
2006	Salle OMS El Biar; Algiers, Algeria	(South Africa) Michelle Edwards	(Seychelles) Juliette Ah-Wan (Seychelles) Catherina Paulin	21–12, 23–21	Gold
2007	Stadium National Badminton Centre; Rose Hill, Mauritius	(South Africa) Kerry-Lee Harrington	(Nigeria) Grace Daniel (Mauritius) Karen Foo Kune	18–21, 12–21	Bronze
2009	Moi International Sports Complex; Nairobi, Kenya	(South Africa) Kerry-Lee Harrington	(Nigeria) Grace Daniel (Nigeria) Mary Gideon	16–21, 15–21	Silver
2012	Arat Kilo Hall; Addis Ababa, Ethiopia	(South Africa) Michelle Butler-Emmett	(Nigeria) Grace Daniel (Nigeria) Susan Ideh	19–21, 21–14, 22–24	Bronze

Mixed doubles
Year	Venue	Partner	Opponent	Score	Result
2009	Moi International Sports Complex; Nairobi, Kenya	(South Africa) Dorian James	(Seychelles) Georgie Cupidon (Seychelles) Juliette Ah-Wan	13–21, 14–21	Bronze
2012	Arat Kilo Hall; Addis Ababa, Ethiopia	(South Africa) Enrico James	(South Africa) Dorian James (South Africa) Michelle Edwards	16–21, 6–21	Silver

=== BWF International Challenge/Series ===
Women's singles
Year	Tournament	Opponent	Score	Result
2008	South Africa International	(South Africa) Kerry-Lee Harrington	21–12, 21–14	(gold) Winner
2010	Botswana International	(Italy) Agnese Allegrini	10–21, 8–21	(silver) Runner-up
2011	Ethiopia International	(Australia) Victoria Na	13–21, 21–15, 14–21	(silver) Runner-up
2012	South Africa International	(South Africa) Elme de Villiers	21–16, 21–18	(gold) Winner

Women's doubles
Year	Tournament	Partner	Opponent	Score	Result
2008	Mauritius International	(South Africa) Kerry-Lee Harrington	(South Africa) Chantal Botts (South Africa) Michelle Edwards	7–21, 21–17, 14–21	(silver) Runner-up
2010	Uganda International	(South Africa) Jade Morgan	(South Africa) Annari Viljoen (South Africa) Michelle Edwards	21–14, 11–21, 18–21	(silver) Runner-up
2010	Botswana International	(South Africa) Jade Morgan	(South Africa) Annari Viljoen (South Africa) Michelle Edwards	12–21, 15–21	(silver) Runner-up
2011	Namibia International	(South Africa) Michelle Butler-Emmett	(Egypt) Hadia Hosny (Morocco) Rajae Rochdy	21–14, 21–9	(gold) Winner
2011	Botswana International	(South Africa) Michelle Butler-Emmett	(South Africa) Annari Viljoen (South Africa) Michelle Edwards	12–21, 14–21	(silver) Runner-up
2012	South Africa International	(Mauritius) Shama Aboobakar	(South Africa) Annari Viljoen (South Africa) Michelle Edwards	19–21, 21–15, 13–21	(silver) Runner-up
2015	South Africa International	(South Africa) Jade Kraemer	(Turkey) Cemre Fere (Turkey) Ebru Yazgan	16–21, 15–21	(silver) Runner-up

Mixed doubles
Year	Tournament	Partner	Opponent	Score	Result
2010	Botswana International	(South Africa) Enrico James	(South Africa) Dorian James (South Africa) Michelle Edwards	19–21, 11–21	(silver) Runner-up
2011	South Africa International	(South Africa) Enrico James	(South Africa) Chris Dednam (South Africa) Annari Viljoen	20–22, 21–11, 14–21	(silver) Runner-up
2014	South Africa International	(South Africa) Prakash Vijayanath	(South Africa) Cameron Coetzer (South Africa) Michelle Butler-Emmett	23–25, 21–19, 15–21	(silver) Runner-up

BWF International Challenge tournament
BWF International Series tournament
BWF Future Series tournament
