= Margaret Nankabirwa =

Ugandan badminton player (born 1987)

Personal information
- Born: 6 July 1987 (age 39) Nsambya, Uganda

Sport
- Country: Uganda
- Sport: Badminton

Women's
- Highest ranking: 295 (WS) 2 Feb 2012; 132 (WD) 29 Mar 2012; 303 (XD) 26 Aug 2010
- BWF profile
Medal record
Badminton
Representing Uganda
African Badminton Championships
Bronze medal – third place	2012 Addis Ababa	Women's doubles

Margaret Nankabirwa (born 6 July 1987) is a Ugandan female badminton player.

== Career ==
Nankabirwa started playing badminton in 2008, inspired by her mother. In 2010, she competed at the Commonwealth Games in New Delhi, India and defeated by Alex Bruce of Canada in the first round of women's singles event. In 2014, she competed in Glasgow, Scotland and defeated in first round in women's singles, doubles, and mixed doubles event.

== Achievements ==
=== African Badminton Championships ===
Women's Doubles
Year	Venue	Partner	Opponent	Score	Result
2012	Arat Kilo Hall; Addis Ababa, Ethiopia	(Uganda) Bridget Shamim Bangi	(South Africa) Annari Viljoen (South Africa) Michelle Edwards	10–21, 13–21	Bronze

=== BWF International Challenge/Series ===
Women's singles
Year	Tournament	Opponent	Score	Result
2009	Uganda International	(Mauritius) Karen Foo Kune	16–21, 9–21	(silver) Runner-up

Women's doubles
Year	Tournament	Partner	Opponent	Score	Result
2013	Kenya International	(Uganda) Bridget Shamim Bangi	(Nigeria) Dorcas Ajoke Adesokan (Nigeria) Grace Gabriel	18–21, 9–21	(silver) Runner-up
2013	Uganda International	(Uganda) Bridget Shamim Bangi	(Mauritius) Shama Aboobakar (Nigeria) Grace Gabriel	13–21, 21–18, 12–21	(silver) Runner-up
2009	Uganda International	(Uganda) Bridget Shamim Bangi	(Uganda) Rose Nakalya (Uganda) Norah Nassimbwa	21–16, 21–10	(gold) Winner

BWF International Challenge tournament
BWF International Series tournament
BWF Future Series tournament
