= 2007 African Badminton Championships =

Tournament details
- Dates: 21–26 May
- Edition: 14th
- Venue: National Badminton Centre
- Location: Beau Bassin-Rose Hill, Mauritius

The 2007 African Badminton Championships were the continental badminton championships to crown the best players and teams across Africa. The tournament was held at the National Badminton Centre in Rose Hill, Mauritius, from 21 to 26 May 2007.

Seychelles created history by winning their first title in the mixed team event after they defeated South Africa 3–2 in the final.

== Medalists ==
Event	Gold	Silver	Bronze
Men's singles	(Algeria) Nabil Lasmari	(Zambia) Eli Mambwe	(South Africa) Chris Dednam
Men's singles	(Algeria) Nabil Lasmari	(Zambia) Eli Mambwe	(Uganda) Edwin Ekiring
Women's singles	(Nigeria) Grace Daniel	(South Africa) Kerry-Lee Harrington	(South Africa) Stacey Doubell
Women's singles	(Nigeria) Grace Daniel	(South Africa) Kerry-Lee Harrington	(Mauritius) Karen Foo Kune
Men's doubles	(South Africa) Chris Dednam (South Africa) Roelof Dednam	(Seychelles) Georgie Cupidon (Seychelles) Steve Malcouzanne	(Algeria) Nabil Lasmari (Algeria) Ammar Zeradine
Men's doubles	(South Africa) Chris Dednam (South Africa) Roelof Dednam	(Seychelles) Georgie Cupidon (Seychelles) Steve Malcouzanne	(Mauritius) Stephan Beeharry (Mauritius) Vishal Sawaram
Women's doubles	(South Africa) Chantal Botts (South Africa) Michelle Edwards	(Nigeria) Grace Daniel (Mauritius) Karen Foo Kune	(Seychelles) Juliette Ah-Wan (Seychelles) Catherina Paulin
Women's doubles	(South Africa) Chantal Botts (South Africa) Michelle Edwards	(Nigeria) Grace Daniel (Mauritius) Karen Foo Kune	(South Africa) Stacey Doubell (South Africa) Kerry-Lee Harrington
Mixed doubles	(Seychelles) Georgie Cupidon (Seychelles) Juliette Ah-Wan	(South Africa) Chris Dednam (South Africa) Michelle Edwards	(Zambia) Eli Mambwe (Zambia) Ogar Siamupangila
Mixed doubles	(Seychelles) Georgie Cupidon (Seychelles) Juliette Ah-Wan	(South Africa) Chris Dednam (South Africa) Michelle Edwards	(Mauritius) Stephan Beeharry (Mauritius) Karen Foo Kune
Mixed team	Seychelles; Georgie Cupidon; Nicholas Jumaye; Steve Malcouzanne; Juliette Ah-Wan; Cynthia Course; Shirley Etienne; Catherina Paulin	South Africa; Robert Abrahams; Chris Dednam; Roelof Dednam; Enrico James; Willem Viljoen; Chantal Botts; Stacey Doubell; Michelle Edwards; Kerry-Lee Harrington	Mauritius; Lloyd Alam; Stephan Beeharry; Sahir Edoo; Yoni Louison; Vishal Sawaram; Neeresh Ramtohul; Chis Umanee; Deborah Baillache; Karen Foo Kune; Kate Foo Kune; Yeldy Louison; Marlyse Marquer
Mixed team	Seychelles; Georgie Cupidon; Nicholas Jumaye; Steve Malcouzanne; Juliette Ah-Wan; Cynthia Course; Shirley Etienne; Catherina Paulin	South Africa; Robert Abrahams; Chris Dednam; Roelof Dednam; Enrico James; Willem Viljoen; Chantal Botts; Stacey Doubell; Michelle Edwards; Kerry-Lee Harrington	Zambia; Eli Mambwe; Lucio Mambwe; Juma Muwowo; Jean Mabiza; Delphine Nakanyika; Ogar Siamupangila

=== Medal table ===
* Host nation (Mauritius)

Rank	Nation	Gold	Silver	Bronze	Total
1	South Africa	2	3	3	8
2	Seychelles	2	1	1	4
3	Nigeria	1	0.5	0	1.5
4	Algeria	1	0	1	2
5	Zambia	0	1	2	3
6	Mauritius*	0	0.5	3	3.5
7	Uganda	0	0	1	1
Totals (7 entries)		6	6	11	23

== Team event ==
=== Group stage ===
==== Group A ====
Team	Pld	W	L	MF	MA	MD	Pts
South Africa	3	3	0	15	0	+15	3
Seychelles	3	2	1	10	5	+5	2
Botswana	3	1	2	4	11	−7	1
Madagascar	3	0	3	1	14	−13	0

South Africa	5–0	Seychelles
South Africa	5–0	Botswana
South Africa	5–0	Madagascar
Seychelles	5–0	Botswana
Seychelles	5–0	Madagascar
Botswana	4–1	Madagascar

==== Group B ====
Team	Pld	W	L	MF	MA	MD	Pts
Mauritius	3	3	0	13	2	+15	3
Zambia	3	2	1	9	6	+3	2
Algeria	3	1	2	8	7	+1	1
Kenya	3	0	3	0	15	−15	0

Mauritius	3–2	Algeria
Mauritius	5–0	Zambia
Mauritius	5–0	Kenya
Algeria	1–4	Zambia
Algeria	5–0	Kenya
Zambia	5–0	Kenya

=== Knockout stage ===
Semi-finals
South Africa	3
Zambia	0
Seychelles	3
Mauritius	0

Final
South Africa	2
Seychelles	3

=== Final ===
South Africa
2
National Badminton Centre, Court 1
23 May 2007

Seychelles
3

			1	2	3
1	(South Africa) (Seychelles)	Chris Dednam / Michelle Edwards; Georgie Cupidon / Catherina Paulin	15; 21	13; 21
2	(South Africa) (Seychelles)	Kerry-Lee Harrington; Juliette Ah-Wan	11; 21	16; 21
3	(South Africa) (Seychelles)	Chris Dednam; Steve Malcouzanne	21; 13	21; 16
4	(South Africa) (Seychelles)	Chantal Botts / Michelle Edwards; Juliette Ah-Wan / Shirley Etienne	21; 10	21; 18
5	(South Africa) (Seychelles)	Roelof Dednam / Willem Viljoen; Georgie Cupidon / Steve Malcouzanne	16; 21	21; 7	13; 21
