= 2008 Thomas & Uber Cups Preliminaries for Africa =

Tournament details
- Dates: 17–21 February 2008
- Edition: 3
- Venue: National Badminton Centre
- Location: Rose Hill, Mauritius

The 2008 Thomas & Uber Cups Preliminaries for Africa were held in Rose Hill, Mauritius, between 17–21 February and organised by Mauritius Badminton Association. Kenya was scheduled to host the events, but domestic unrest has led to them being moved to Mauritius. South Africa was the defending champion in men's and women's team events. This tournament serves as qualification stage for African countries for the 2008 Thomas & Uber Cup.

== Medalists ==
- Men's Team

| Medal | Team | Players |
|---|---|---|
| Gold | Nigeria | Greg Orobosa Okuonghea, Jinkan Bulus, Olaoluwa Fagbemi, Ibrahim Adamu, Akeem Olanrewaju Ogunseye |
| Silver | South Africa | Chris Dednam, Roelof Dednam, Wiaan Viljoen, Dorian James, Enrico James |
| Bronze | Egypt | Kareem Shedeed, Abdelrahman Kashkal, Ahmed Reda, Ahmed Salah |
| Bronze | Mauritius | Yoni Louison, Stephan Beeharry, Vishal Sawaram, Lloyd Alam, Krish Umanee, Daven Pachee, Norman Fon Sing |

- Women's Team

| Medal | Team | Players |
|---|---|---|
| Gold | South Africa | Stacey Doubell, Michelle Edwards, Kerry-Lee Harrington, Jade Morgan, Annari Viljoen, Chantal Botts |
| Silver | Nigeria | Grace Daniel, Susan Ideh, Gideon Mary, Imhade Oribabor |
| Bronze | Mauritius | Yeldi Louison, Kate Foo Kune, Marlyse Marquer, Karen Foo Kune, Priscilla Vinayagum Pillay |
| Bronze | Egypt | Hadia Hosny, Dina Nagy, Yasmina Farid, Noran Hassan El Banna |

== Men's team ==
=== Group stage ===
==== Group A ====
| Pos | Team | Pld | W | L | MF | MA | MD | Pts | Qualification | South Africa | Egypt | Uganda | Kenya |
|---|---|---|---|---|---|---|---|---|---|---|---|---|---|
| 1 | South Africa | 3 | 3 | 0 | 14 | 1 | +13 | 3 | Advance to knockout stage | — | 5–0 | 4–1 | 5–0 |
| 2 | Egypt | 3 | 2 | 1 | 8 | 7 | +1 | 2 | Advance to knockout stage | | — | 3–2 | 5–0 |
| 3 | Uganda | 3 | 1 | 2 | 8 | 7 | +1 | 1 | | | | — | 5–0 |
| 4 | Kenya | 3 | 0 | 3 | 0 | 15 | −15 | 0 | | | | | — |

Source: africa-badminton.com

==== Group B ====
| Pos | Team | Pld | W | L | MF | MA | MD | Pts | Qualification | Nigeria | Mauritius | Zambia |
|---|---|---|---|---|---|---|---|---|---|---|---|---|
| 1 | Nigeria | 2 | 2 | 0 | 8 | 2 | +6 | 2 | Advance to knockout stage | — | 4–1 | 4–1 |
| 2 | Mauritius (H) | 2 | 1 | 1 | 4 | 6 | −2 | 1 | Advance to knockout stage | | — | 3–2 |
| 3 | Zambia | 2 | 0 | 2 | 3 | 7 | −4 | 0 | | | | — |

Source: africa-badminton.com
(H) Host

=== Knockout stage ===
==== Bracket ====
Semi-finals
20 February
South Africa | 3
Mauritius | 0
20 February
Egypt | 1
Nigeria | 3

Final
21 February
South Africa | 0
Nigeria | 3

==== Semi-finals ====
- South Africa vs Mauritius

South Africa
3
National Badminton Centre
20 February 2008

Mauritius
0

| | | | 1 | 2 | 3 |
|---|---|---|---|---|---|---|
| 1 | (South Africa) (Mauritius) | Chris Dednam; Yoni Louison | 21; 10 | 20; 22 | 21; 10 |
| 2 | (South Africa) (Mauritius) | Willem Viljoen; Stephan Beeharry | 21; 17 | 15; 21 | 21; 10 |
| 3 | (South Africa) (Mauritius) | Enrico James; Vishal Sawaram | 21; 19 | 21; 15 |
| 4 | (South Africa) (Mauritius) | Chris Dednam / Roelof Dednam; Stephan Beeharry / Vishal Sawaram | | | | not played |
| 5 | (South Africa) (Mauritius) | Dorian James / Willem Viljoen; Norman Fon Sing / Krish Umanee | | | | not played |

- Nigeria vs Egypt

Nigeria
3
National Badminton Centre
20 February 2008

Egypt
1

| | | | 1 | 2 | 3 |
|---|---|---|---|---|---|---|
| 1 | (Nigeria) (Egypt) | Jinkan Ifraimu; Kareem Shedeed | 21; 12 | 21; 11 |
| 2 | (Nigeria) (Egypt) | Ibrahim Adamu; Abdelrahman Kashkal | 21; 16 | 21; 11 |
| 3 | (Nigeria) (Egypt) | Akeem Ogunseye; Ahmed Reda | | | | w/o |
| 4 | (Nigeria) (Egypt) | Ibrahim Adamu / Greg Okuonghae; Abdelrahman Kashkal / Kareem Shedeed | 21; 15 | 21; 12 |
| 5 | (Nigeria) (Egypt) | Ola Fagbemi / Jinkan Ifraimu; Ahmed Reda / Ahmed Salah | | | | not played |

==== Final ====
- South Africa vs Nigeria

South Africa
0
National Badminton Centre
21 February 2008

Nigeria
3

| | | | 1 | 2 | 3 |
|---|---|---|---|---|---|---|
| 1 | (South Africa) (Nigeria) | Chris Dednam; Greg Okuonghae | 21; 18 | 20; 22 | 15; 21 |
| 2 | (South Africa) (Nigeria) | Roelof Dednam; Ola Fagbemi | 15; 21 | 16; 21 |
| 3 | (South Africa) (Nigeria) | Willem Viljoen; Jinkan Ifraimu | 21; 11 | 17; 21 | 12; 21 |
| 4 | (South Africa) (Nigeria) | Chris Dednam / Roelof Dednam; Ibrahim Adamu / Greg Okuonghae | | | | not played |
| 5 | (South Africa) (Nigeria) | Dorian James / Willem Viljoen; Ola Fagbemi / Jinkan Ifraimu | | | | not played |

== Women's team ==
=== Group stage ===
==== Round-robin ====
| Pos | Team | Pld | W | L | MF | MA | MD | Pts | Qualification | Nigeria | South Africa | Mauritius | Egypt |
|---|---|---|---|---|---|---|---|---|---|---|---|---|---|
| 1 | Nigeria | 3 | 3 | 0 | 13 | 2 | +11 | 3 | Advance to knockout stage | — | 3–2 | 3–2 | 5–0 |
| 2 | South Africa | 3 | 2 | 1 | 11 | 4 | +7 | 2 | Advance to knockout stage | | — | 4–1 | 5–0 |
| 3 | Mauritius (H) | 3 | 1 | 2 | 5 | 10 | −5 | 1 | Advance to knockout stage | | | — | 4–1 |
| 4 | Egypt | 3 | 0 | 3 | 1 | 14 | −13 | 0 | Advance to knockout stage | | | | — |

Source: africa-badminton.com
(H) Host

=== Knockout stage ===
==== Bracket ====
Semi-finals
20 February
South Africa | 3
Mauritius | 1
20 February
Egypt | 0
Nigeria | 3

Final
21 February
South Africa | 3
Nigeria | 2

==== Semi-finals ====
- South Africa vs Mauritius

South Africa
3
National Badminton Centre
20 February 2008

Mauritius
1

| | | | 1 | 2 | 3 |
|---|---|---|---|---|---|---|
| 1 | (South Africa) (Mauritius) | Kerry-Lee Harrington; Karen Foo Kune | 16; 21 | 11; 21 |
| 2 | (South Africa) (Mauritius) | Annari Viljoen; Kate Foo Kune | 21; 18 | 21; 16 |
| 3 | (South Africa) (Mauritius) | Stacey Doubell; Marlyse Marquer | 21; 15 | 21; 17 |
| 4 | (South Africa) (Mauritius) | Chantal Botts / Michelle Claire Edwards; Yeldy Louison / Kate Foo Kune | 21; 8 | 21; 14 |
| 5 | (South Africa) (Mauritius) | Stacey Doubell / Annari Viljoen; Marlyse Marquer / Priscilla Pillay Vinayagum | | | | not played |

- Nigeria vs Egypt

Nigeria
3
National Badminton Centre
20 February 2008

Egypt
0

| | | | 1 | 2 | 3 |
|---|---|---|---|---|---|---|
| 1 | (Nigeria) (Egypt) | Grace Daniel; Hadia Hosny | 21; 7 | 21; 13 |
| 2 | (Nigeria) (Egypt) | Mary Gideon; Dina Nagy | 21; 18 | 21; 12 |
| 3 | (Nigeria) (Egypt) | Imhade Oribabor; Noran Hassan Elbanna | 21; 16 | 21; 18 |
| 4 | (Nigeria) (Egypt) | Susan Ideh / Imhade Oribabor; Noran Hassan Elbanna / Yasmina Farid | | | | not played |
| 5 | (Nigeria) (Egypt) | Grace Daniel / Mary Gideon; Hadia Hosny / Dina Nagy | | | | not played |

==== Final ====
- South Africa vs Nigeria

South Africa
3
National Badminton Centre
21 February 2008

Nigeria
2

| | | | 1 | 2 | 3 |
|---|---|---|---|---|---|
| 1 | (South Africa) (Nigeria) | Stacey Doubell; Grace Daniel | 15; 21 | 13; 21 |
| 2 | (South Africa) (Nigeria) | Michelle Claire Edwards; Susan Ideh | 19; 21 | 21; 15 | 21; 10 |
| 3 | (South Africa) (Nigeria) | Chantal Botts; Mary Gideon | 14; 21 | 10; 21 |
| 4 | (South Africa) (Nigeria) | Jade Morgan / Annari Viljoen; Susan Ideh / Imhade Oribabor | 21; 13 | 21; 16 |
| 5 | (South Africa) (Nigeria) | Chantal Botts / Michelle Claire Edwards; Grace Daniel / Mary Gideon | 21; 19 | 18; 21 | 21; 19 |

== See also ==
- 2008 Thomas & Uber Cup qualification
