= Kerry-Lee Harrington =

South African badminton player (born 1986)

Personal information
- Born: 21 March 1986 (age 40) Durban, South Africa
- Height: 1.61 m (5 ft 3 1/2 in)
- Weight: 57 kg (126 lb)

Sport
- Country: South Africa
- Sport: Badminton
- Handedness: Right

Women's singles & doubles
- Highest ranking: 97 (WS 8 December 2011); 237 (XD 22 October 2009)
- BWF profile
Medal record
Women's badminton
Representing South Africa
All-Africa Games
Silver medal – second place	2011 Maputo	Mixed team
Bronze medal – third place	2007 Algiers	Women's doubles
African Championships
Gold medal – first place	2011 Marrakesh	Mixed team
Gold medal – first place	2009 Nairobi	Mixed team
Silver medal – second place	2011 Marrakesh	Women's singles
Silver medal – second place	2009 Nairobi	Women's doubles
Silver medal – second place	2007 Rose Hill	Women's singles
Silver medal – second place	2007 Rose Hill	Mixed team
Bronze medal – third place	2010 Kampala	Women's singles
Bronze medal – third place	2007 Rose Hill	Women's doubles
Africa Team Championships
Gold medal – first place	2012 Addis Ababa	Women's team
Gold medal – first place	2010 Kampala	Women's team
Gold medal – first place	2008 Rose Hill	Women's team

Kerry-Lee Harrington (born 21 March 1986) is a South African badminton player. She won a bronze medal, along with her partner Stacy Doubell, in the women's doubles at the 2007 All-Africa Games in Algiers, Algeria. Harrington represented South Africa at the 2008 Summer Olympics in Beijing, where she competed in the women's singles. She received a bye for the second preliminary round match, before losing out to Malaysia's Wong Mew Choo, with a score of 4–21 each in two straight periods.

== Achievements ==
=== All-Africa Games ===
Women's doubles
Year	Venue	Partner	Opponent	Score	Result
2007	Salle OMS El Biar; Algiers, Algeria	(South Africa) Stacey Doubell			Bronze

=== African Championships ===
Women's singles
Year	Venue	Opponent	Score	Result
2011	Marrakesh, Morocco	(South Africa) Stacey Doubell	18–21, 16–21	Silver
2010	Sharing Youth Center, Kampala, Uganda	(Egypt) Hadia Hosny	17–21, 15–21	Bronze
2007	Stadium National Badminton Centre, Rose Hill, Mauritius	(Nigeria) Grace Daniel	16–21, 16–21	Silver

Women's doubles
Year	Venue	Partner	Opponent	Score	Result
2009	Moi International Sports Complex; Nairobi, Kenya	(South Africa) Stacey Doubell	(Nigeria) Grace Daniel (Nigeria) Mary Gideon	16–21, 15–21	Silver
2007	Stadium National Badminton Centre; Rose Hill, Mauritius	(South Africa) Stacey Doubell	(Nigeria) Grace Daniel (Mauritius) Karen Foo Kune	18–21, 12–21	Bronze

=== BWF International Challenge/Series (4 runners-up) ===
Women's singles
Year	Tournament	Opponent	Score	Result
2008	South Africa International	(South Africa) Stacey Doubell	12–21, 14–21	(silver) Runner-up

Women's doubles
Year	Tournament	Partner	Opponent	Score	Result
2019	Botswana International	(South Africa) Michelle Butler-Emmett	(South Africa) Megan de Beer (South Africa) Johanita Scholtz	18–21, 20–22	(silver) Runner-up
2008	Mauritius International	(South Africa) Stacey Doubell	(South Africa) Chantal Botts (South Africa) Michelle Edwards	7–21, 21–17, 14–21	(silver) Runner-up
2008	Mauritius International	(South Africa) Chantal Botts	(Mauritius) Karen Foo Kune (Nigeria) Grace Daniel	15–21, 22–24	(silver) Runner-up

BWF International Challenge tournament
BWF International Series tournament
BWF Future Series tournament
