= Catherina Paulin =

Seychellois badminton player (born 1985)

Personal information
- Born: 3 February 1985 (age 41)

Sport
- Country: Seychelles
- Sport: Badminton

Women's singles & doubles
- Highest ranking: 319 (WS 22 October 2009); 207 (WD 22 October 2009); 295 (XD 15 October 2009)
- BWF profile
Medal record
Women's badminton
Representing Seychelles
All-Africa Games
Bronze medal – third place	2003 Abuja	Mixed team
Bronze medal – third place	2007 Algiers	Women's singles
Bronze medal – third place	2007 Algiers	Mixed team
African Championships
Gold medal – first place	2007 Rose Hill	Mixed team
Silver medal – second place	2006 Algiers	Women's doubles
Silver medal – second place	2009 Nairobi	Mixed team
Bronze medal – third place	2002 Casablanca	Women's doubles
Bronze medal – third place	2006 Algiers	Mixed team
Bronze medal – third place	2007 Rose Hill	Women's doubles
Bronze medal – third place	2009 Nairobi	Women's singles
Bronze medal – third place	2009 Nairobi	Women's doubles

Catherina Paulin (born 3 February 1985) is a Seychellois badminton player. She was part of the national team that won the bronze medals at the 2003 and 2007 All-Africa Games, also settled another bronze medal in the women's singles in 2007. Paulin competed at the 2002 Commonwealth Games in Manchester, England.

== Achievements ==
=== All-Africa Games ===
Women's singles

Year	Venue	Opponent	Score	Result
2007	Salle OMS El Biar, Algiers, Algeria		–, –	Bronze

=== African Championships ===
Women's singles

Year	Venue	Opponent	Score	Result
2009	Moi International Sports Complex, Nairobi, Kenya	(South Africa) Stacey Doubell	13–21, 17–21	Bronze

Women's doubles

Year	Venue	Partner	Opponent	Score	Result
2009	Moi International Sports Complex, Nairobi, Kenya	(Seychelles) Juliette Ah-Wan	(South Africa) Stacey Doubell (South Africa) Kerry-Lee Harrington	19–21, 21–19, 17–21	Bronze
2007	Stadium Badminton Rose Hill, Rose Hill, Mauritius	(Seychelles) Juliette Ah-Wan	(South Africa) Michelle Edwards (South Africa) Chantal Botts	17–21, 19–21	Bronze
2006	Salle OMS El Biar, Algiers, Algeria	(Seychelles) Juliette Ah-Wan	(South Africa) Michelle Edwards (South Africa) Stacey Doubell	12–21, 21–23	Silver
2002	Casablanca, Morocco	(Seychelles) Juliette Ah-Wan	(Nigeria) Miriam Sude (Nigeria) Grace Daniel	2–7, 3–7, 5–7	Bronze

=== IBF International ===
Women's singles

Year	Tournament	Opponent	Score	Result
2002	South Africa International	(South Africa) Michelle Edwards	2–7, 2–7, 0–7	(silver) Runner-up
