= Karen Foo Kune =

Mauritian badminton player and politician

The Honourable Karen Foo Kune-Bacha
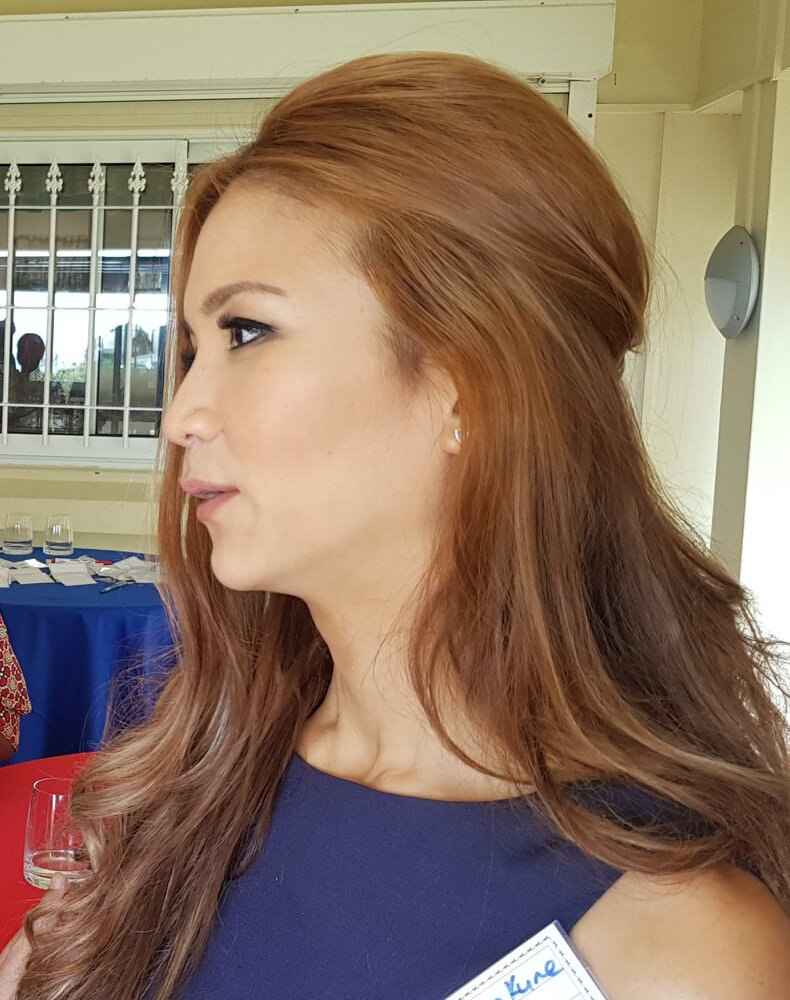
- Foo Kune in 2020

Junior Minister
- Incumbent
- Assumed office 22 November 2024
- Prime Minister: Navin Ramgoolam
- Minister: Deven Nagalingum
- Ministry: Youth and Sports

Member of Parliament; for Beau Bassin and Petite Rivière
- Incumbent
- Assumed office 8 November 2019
- Preceded by: Anil Gayan

Personal details
- Born: Eileen Karen Lee Chin Foo Kune; 29 May 1982 (age 44) Rose Hill, Plaines Wilhems, Mauritius
- Party: Mauritian Militant Movement

Karen Foo Kune
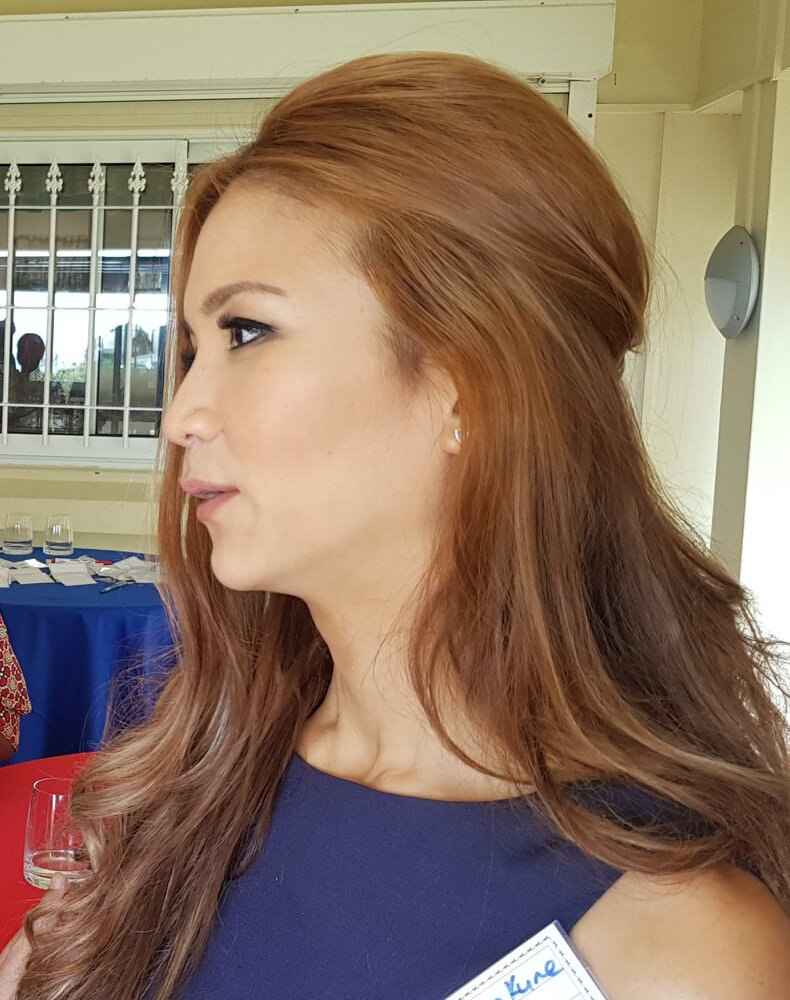

Personal information
- Height: 1.64 m (5 ft 5 in)
- Weight: 55 kg (121 lb)

Sport
- Country: Mauritius
- Sport: Badminton

Women's singles & doubles
- Highest ranking: 81 (WS 11 March 2010); 69 (WD) 5 April 2012); 259 (XD 26 August 2010)
- BWF profile
Medal record
Women's badminton
Representing Mauritius
All-Africa Games
| Bronze medal – third place | 2011 Maputo | Women's doubles |
| Bronze medal – third place | 2011 Maputo | Mixed team |
African Championships
| Silver medal – second place | 2007 Rose Hill | Women's doubles |
| Bronze medal – third place | 2002 Casablanca | Women's doubles |
| Bronze medal – third place | 2002 Casablanca | Mixed team |
| Bronze medal – third place | 2004 Rose Hill | Women's doubles |
| Bronze medal – third place | 2006 Algiers | Women's singles |
| Bronze medal – third place | 2006 Algiers | Women's doubles |
| Bronze medal – third place | 2007 Rose Hill | Women's singles |
| Bronze medal – third place | 2007 Rose Hill | Mixed doubles |
| Bronze medal – third place | 2007 Rose Hill | Mixed team |
| Bronze medal – third place | 2009 Nairobi | Mixed team |
| Bronze medal – third place | 2011 Marrakesh | Women's doubles |
| Bronze medal – third place | 2011 Marrakesh | Mixed team |
Africa Team Championships
| Silver medal – second place | 2006 Rose Hill | Women's team |
| Bronze medal – third place | 2008 Rose Hill | Women's team |
| Bronze medal – third place | 2012 Addis Ababa | Women's team |

Eileen Karen Lee Chin Foo Kune-Bacha (born 29 May 1982) is a Mauritian badminton player and politician. She was the Mauritian sportswoman of the year in 2004 and 2009. She participated in badminton at the 2008 Summer Olympics and made it to the Commonwealth Games in 2002, 2006, and 2010. In 2011, she won the bronze medals at the All-Africa Games in the women's doubles and mixed team event.

== Achievements ==
=== African Games ===
Women's doubles
| Year | Venue | Partner | Opponent | Score | Result |
|---|---|---|---|---|---|
| 2011 | Escola Josina Machel, Maputo, Mozambique | (Mauritius) Priscilla Pillay-Vinayagam | (South Africa) Stacey Doubell (South Africa) Annari Viljoen | 10–21, 14–21 | Bronze |

=== African Championships ===
Women's singles
| Year | Venue | Opponent | Score | Result |
|---|---|---|---|---|
| 2006 | Salle OMS El Biar, Algiers, Algeria | (Seychelles) Juliette Ah-Wan | 9–21, 17–21 | Bronze |
| 2007 | Stadium Badminton Rose Hill, Beau Bassin-Rose Hill, Mauritius | (South Africa) Kerry-Lee Harrington | 15–21, 19–21 | Bronze |

Women's doubles
| Year | Venue | Partner | Opponent | Score | Result |
|---|---|---|---|---|---|
| 2002 | Mohammed V Indoor Sport Complex; Casablanca, Morocco | (Mauritius) Anusha Dajee | (South Africa) Chantal Botts (South Africa) Michelle Edwards | 7–0, 7–8, 0–7 | Bronze |
| 2004 | National Badminton Centre; Beau Bassin-Rose Hill, Mauritius | (Mauritius) Amrita Sawaram | | | Bronze |
| 2006 | Salle OMS El Biar; Algiers, Algeria | (Mauritius) Amrita Sawaram | (South Africa) Stacey Doubell (South Africa) Michelle Edwards | | Bronze |
| 2007 | Stadium Badminton Rose Hill; Beau Bassin-Rose Hill, Mauritius | (Nigeria) Grace Daniel | (South Africa) Chantal Botts (South Africa) Michelle Edwards | 19–21, 12–21 | Silver |
| 2011 | Marrakesh, Morocco | (Mauritius) Kate Foo Kune | (South Africa) Michelle Edwards (South Africa) Annari Viljoen | 21–19, 9–21, 8–21 | Bronze |

Mixed doubles
| Year | Venue | Partner | Opponent | Score | Result |
|---|---|---|---|---|---|
| 2007 | Stadium Badminton Rose Hill; Beau Bassin-Rose Hill, Mauritius | (Mauritius) Stephan Beeharry | (Seychelles) Georgie Cupidon (Seychelles) Juliette Ah-Wan | 14–21, 13–21 | Bronze |

=== BWF International Challenge/Series ===
Women's singles
| Year | Tournament | Opponent | Score | Result |
|---|---|---|---|---|
| 2002 | Kenya International | (Nigeria) Grace Daniel | 0–7, 5–7, 4–7 | (silver) Runner-up |
| 2009 | Uganda International | (Uganda) Margaret Nankabirwa | 21–16, 21–9 | (gold) Winner |
| 2009 | Mongolia International | (Slovakia) Monika Fašungová | 21–18, 12–21, 15–21 | (silver) Runner-up |

Women's doubles
| Year | Tournament | Partner | Opponent | Score | Result |
|---|---|---|---|---|---|
| 2002 | Kenya International | (Mauritius) Anusha Dajee | (Kenya) Rose Wanjala (Kenya) Deepa A. Shah | 7–2, 7–1, 7–4 | (gold) Winner |
| 2006 | Mauritius International | (Nigeria) Grace Daniel | (South Africa) Chantal Botts (South Africa) Kerry-Lee Harrington | 21–15, 24–22 | (gold) Winner |

Mixed doubles
| Year | Tournament | Partner | Opponent | Score | Result |
|---|---|---|---|---|---|
| 2010 | Mauritius International | (Indonesia) Yoga Ukikasah | (France) Oliver Fossy (France) Elisa Chanteur | 22–20, 22–20 | (gold) Winner |

BWF International Challenge tournament
BWF International Series tournament
