= 2009 African Badminton Championships =

Tournament details
- Dates: 17–24 April
- Edition: 15th
- Venue: Moi International Sports Centre
- Location: Nairobi, Kenya

The 2009 African Badminton Championships were the continental badminton championships to crown the best players and teams across Africa. The tournament was held at the Moi International Sports Centre in Nairobi, Kenya, from 17 to 24 April 2009.

In the semi-finals of the team event, South Africa defeated Mauritius 3–1 while Seychelles defeated Egypt 3–0 to reach the final. In the final, South Africa dethroned defending champions Seychelles by winning against them 3–1.

== Medalists ==
Event	Gold	Silver	Bronze
Men's singles	(Nigeria) Ola Fagbemi	(Nigeria) Jinkan Ifraimu	(Seychelles) Steve Malcouzanne
Men's singles	(Nigeria) Ola Fagbemi	(Nigeria) Jinkan Ifraimu	(Egypt) Abdelrahman Kashkal
Women's singles	(Seychelles) Juliette Ah-Wan	(South Africa) Stacey Doubell	(Seychelles) Catherina Paulin
Women's singles	(Seychelles) Juliette Ah-Wan	(South Africa) Stacey Doubell	(Nigeria) Susan Ideh
Men's doubles	(Nigeria) Ola Fagbemi (Nigeria) Jinkan Ifraimu	(South Africa) Chris Dednam (South Africa) Dorian James	(Seychelles) Georgie Cupidon (Seychelles) Steve Malcouzanne
Men's doubles	(Nigeria) Ola Fagbemi (Nigeria) Jinkan Ifraimu	(South Africa) Chris Dednam (South Africa) Dorian James	(Mauritius) Sahir Edoo (Mauritius) Yoni Louison
Women's doubles	(Nigeria) Grace Daniel (Nigeria) Mary Gideon	(South Africa) Stacey Doubell (South Africa) Kerry-Lee Harrington	(Seychelles) Juliette Ah-Wan (Seychelles) Catherina Paulin
Women's doubles	(Nigeria) Grace Daniel (Nigeria) Mary Gideon	(South Africa) Stacey Doubell (South Africa) Kerry-Lee Harrington	(South Africa) Michelle Edwards (South Africa) Annari Viljoen
Mixed doubles	(Nigeria) Ola Fagbemi (Nigeria) Grace Daniel	(Seychelles) Georgie Cupidon (Seychelles) Juliette Ah-Wan	(South Africa) Dorian James (South Africa) Stacey Doubell
Mixed doubles	(Nigeria) Ola Fagbemi (Nigeria) Grace Daniel	(Seychelles) Georgie Cupidon (Seychelles) Juliette Ah-Wan	(Mauritius) Sahir Edoo (Mauritius) Shama Aboobakar
Mixed team	South Africa; Chris Dednam; Dorian James; Stacey Doubell; Michelle Edwards; Kerry-Lee Harrington; Annari Viljoen	Seychelles; Georgie Cupidon; Steve Malcouzanne; Juliette Ah-Wan; Catherina Paulin	Mauritius; Sahir Edoo; Yoni Louison; Shama Aboobakar; Karen Foo Kune
Mixed team	South Africa; Chris Dednam; Dorian James; Stacey Doubell; Michelle Edwards; Kerry-Lee Harrington; Annari Viljoen	Seychelles; Georgie Cupidon; Steve Malcouzanne; Juliette Ah-Wan; Catherina Paulin	Egypt; Ali Ahmed El-Khateeb; Abdelrahman Kashkal; Shehab Yehia; Noran Hassan Elbanna; Hadia Hosny; Dina Nagy

=== Medal table ===
* Host nation (Kenya)

Rank	Nation	Gold	Silver	Bronze	Total
1	Nigeria	4	1	1	6
2	South Africa	1	3	2	6
3	Seychelles	1	2	4	7
4	Mauritius	0	0	3	3
5	Egypt	0	0	2	2
Totals (5 entries)		6	6	12	24
