= Allisen Camille =

Seychellois badminton player (born 1992)

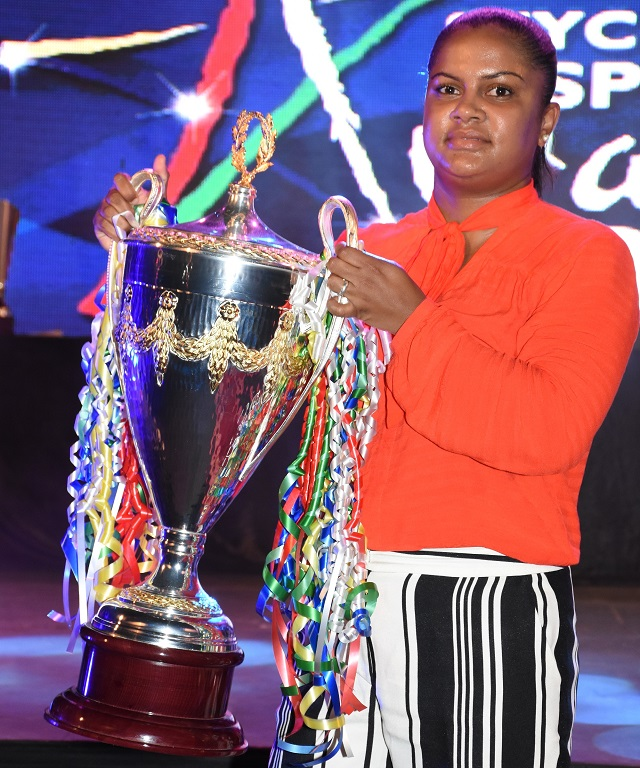
- Allisen Camille, 2018 Seychellois sportswomen of the year

Personal information
- Born: 26 June 1992 (age 34) Victoria, Seychelles
- Height: 1.71 m (5 ft 7 in)
- Weight: 74 kg (163 lb)

Sport
- Country: Seychelles
- Sport: Badminton
- Handedness: Right

Women's singles & doubles
- Highest ranking: 196 (WS 19 April 2012); 152 (WD 3 December 2015); 280 (XD 25 June 2015)
- BWF profile
Medal record
Women's Badminton
Representing Seychelles
All-Africa Games
Gold medal – first place	2015 Brazzaville	Women's doubles
Silver medal – second place	2011 Maputo	Women's doubles
Silver medal – second place	2011 Maputo	Mixed doubles
Bronze medal – third place	2015 Brazzaville	Mixed team
Bronze medal – third place	2011 Maputo	Mixed team
African Championships
Gold medal – first place	2018 Algiers	Women's doubles
Gold medal – first place	2013 Rose Hill	Women's doubles
Silver medal – second place	2014 Gaborone	Women's doubles
Bronze medal – third place	2014 Gaborone	Mixed team
Bronze medal – third place	2013 Rose Hill	Mixed team
Bronze medal – third place	2012 Addis Ababa	Mixed doubles
Bronze medal – third place	2010 Kampala	Women's doubles

Allisen Camille (born 26 June 1992) is a Seychellois badminton player. Camille competed at the 2010, 2014, and 2018 Commonwealth Games. She won two silvers and a bronze at the 2011 All-Africa Games in the women's doubles, mixed doubles, and team event respectively. Partnered with Juliette Ah-Wan, they secured the women's doubles gold medal at the 2015 All-Africa Games.

== Achievements ==
=== All-Africa Games ===
Women's doubles
Year	Venue	Partner	Opponent	Score	Result
2015	Gymnase Étienne Mongha; Brazzaville, Republic of the Congo	(Seychelles) Juliette Ah-Wan	(Mauritius) Kate Foo Kune (Mauritius) Yeldy Louison	22–20, 18–21, 21–14	Gold
2011	Escola Josina Machel; Maputo, Mozambique	(Seychelles) Cynthia Course	(South Africa) Annari Viljoen (South Africa) Stacey Doubell	18–21, 15–21	Silver

Mixed doubles
Year	Venue	Partner	Opponent	Score	Result
2011	Escola Josina Machel; Maputo, Mozambique	(Seychelles) Georgie Cupidon	(South Africa) Willem Viljoen (South Africa) Annari Viljoen	20–22, 21–9, 16–21	Silver

=== African Championships ===
Women's doubles
Year	Venue	Partner	Opponent	Score	Result
2018	Salle OMS Harcha Hacéne, Algiers, Algeria	(Seychelles) Juliette Ah-Wan	(Egypt) Doha Hany (Egypt) Hadia Hosny	21–18, 13–21, 21–18	Gold
2014	Lobatse Stadium, Gaborone, Botswana	(Seychelles) Juliette Ah-Wan	(Mauritius) Kate Foo Kune (Mauritius) Yeldy Louison	17–21, 20–22	Silver
2013	National Badminton Centre, Rose Hill, Mauritius	(Seychelles) Juliette Ah-Wan	(Mauritius) Shama Aboobakar (Mauritius) Yeldy Louison	18–21, 21–16, 21–14	Gold
2010	Sharing Youth Center, Kampala, Uganda	(Seychelles) Juliette Ah-Wan	(Nigeria) Maria Braimoh (Nigeria) Susan Ideh	15–21, 11–21	Bronze

Mixed doubles
Year	Venue	Partner	Opponent	Score	Result
2012	Arat Kilo Hall, Addis Ababa, Ethiopia	(Seychelles) Georgie Cupidon	(South Africa) Enrico James (South Africa) Stacey Doubell	16–21, 21–17, 23–25	Bronze

=== BWF International Challenge/Series ===
Women's doubles
Year	Tournament	Partner	Opponent	Score	Result
2012	Mauritius International	(Nigeria) Cynthia Course	(Mauritius) Shama Aboobakar (Mauritius) Shaama Sandooyeea	21–16, 21–14	(gold) Winner

Mixed doubles
Year	Tournament	Partner	Opponent	Score	Result
2013	Mauritius International	(Seychelles) Georgie Cupidon	(South Africa) Willem Viljoen (South Africa) Michelle Butler-Emmett	12–21, 13–21	(silver) Runner-up

BWF International Challenge tournament
BWF International Series tournament
BWF Future Series tournament
