= 2010 African Badminton Championships =

Tournament details
- Dates: 24-25 February 2010
- Edition: 16th
- Venue: Sharing Youth Center
- Location: Kampala, Uganda

The 2010 African Badminton Championships is a continental badminton championships organized by the Badminton Confederation of Africa. This championships were held in Kampala, Uganda from 24 to 25 February.

== Medalists ==
Event	Gold	Silver	Bronze
Men's singles	(Nigeria) Jinkam Ifraimu	(Nigeria) Ola Fagbemi	(Mauritius) Sahir Edoo
Men's singles	(Nigeria) Jinkam Ifraimu	(Nigeria) Ola Fagbemi	(Nigeria) Ibrahim Adamu
Women's singles	(Egypt) Hadia Hosny	(South Africa) Stacey Doubell	(South Africa) Kerry-Lee Harrington
Women's singles	(Egypt) Hadia Hosny	(South Africa) Stacey Doubell	(Nigeria) Maria Braimoh
Men's doubles	(Nigeria) Jinkam Ifraimu (Nigeria) Ola Fagbemi	(Nigeria) Ibrahim Adamu (Nigeria) Ocholi Edicha	(South Africa) Dorian James (South Africa) Willem Viljoen
Men's doubles	(Nigeria) Jinkam Ifraimu (Nigeria) Ola Fagbemi	(Nigeria) Ibrahim Adamu (Nigeria) Ocholi Edicha	(Mauritius) Sahir Edoo (Mauritius) Yoni Louison
Women's doubles	(South Africa) Michelle Edwards (South Africa) Annari Viljoen	(Nigeria) Maria Braimoh (Nigeria) Susan Ideh	(Seychelles) Juliette Ah-Wan (Seychelles) Alisen Camille
Women's doubles	(South Africa) Michelle Edwards (South Africa) Annari Viljoen	(Nigeria) Maria Braimoh (Nigeria) Susan Ideh	(Mauritius) Marlyse Marquer (Mauritius) Amrita Sawaram
Mixed doubles	(South Africa) Dorian James (South Africa) Michelle Edwards	(South Africa) Roelof Dednam (South Africa) Annari Viljoen	(South Africa) Willem Viljoen (South Africa) Jade Morgan
Mixed doubles	(South Africa) Dorian James (South Africa) Michelle Edwards	(South Africa) Roelof Dednam (South Africa) Annari Viljoen	(Mauritius) Stephan Beeharry (Mauritius) Amrita Sawaram

=== Medal table ===
* Host nation (Uganda)

Rank	Nation	Gold	Silver	Bronze	Total
1	Nigeria	2	3	2	7
2	South Africa	2	2	3	7
3	Egypt	1	0	0	1
4	Mauritius	0	0	4	4
5	Seychelles	0	0	1	1
Totals (5 entries)		5	5	10	20
