= 2012 African Badminton Championships =

Tournament details
- Dates: 26–28 February 2012
- Venue: Arat Kilo Hall
- Location: Addis Ababa, Ethiopia

The 2012 African Badminton Championships or Africa Senior Championships were held in Addis Ababa, Ethiopia, between 26 and 28 February and organised by the Badminton Confederation of Africa.

== Medalists ==
Event	Gold	Silver	Bronze
Men's singles	(South Africa) Jacob Maliekal	(Egypt) A Kashkal	(Nigeria) Eneojo Joseph Abah
Men's singles	(South Africa) Jacob Maliekal	(Egypt) A Kashkal	(Nigeria) Jinkan Bulus
Women's singles	(Nigeria) Grace Gabriel	(Nigeria) Fatima Azeez	(South Africa) Stacey Doubell
Women's singles	(Nigeria) Grace Gabriel	(Nigeria) Fatima Azeez	(Nigeria) Susan F Ideh
Men's doubles	(South Africa) Dorian James and Willem Viljoen	(Nigeria) Jinkan Bulus and Olaoluwa Fagbemi	(South Africa) Chris Dednam and Enrico James
Men's doubles	(South Africa) Dorian James and Willem Viljoen	(Nigeria) Jinkan Bulus and Olaoluwa Fagbemi	(Nigeria) Eneojo Joseph Abah and Victor Makanju
Women's doubles	(South Africa) Annari Viljoen and Michelle Edwards	(Nigeria) Grace Daniel and Susan F Ideh	(Uganda) Shamim Bangi and Margaret Nankabirwa
Women's doubles	(South Africa) Annari Viljoen and Michelle Edwards	(Nigeria) Grace Daniel and Susan F Ideh	(South Africa) Michelle Butler-Emmett and Stacey Doubel
Mixed doubles	(South Africa) Dorian James and Michelle Edwards	(South Africa) Enrico James and Stacey Doubel	(Nigeria) Olaoluwa Fagbemi and Susan F Ideh
Mixed doubles	(South Africa) Dorian James and Michelle Edwards	(South Africa) Enrico James and Stacey Doubel	(Seychelles) Georgie Cupidon and Allisen Camille

=== Medal table ===
* Host nation (Ethiopia)

Rank	Nation	Gold	Silver	Bronze	Total
1	South Africa	4	1	3	8
2	Nigeria	1	3	5	9
3	Egypt	0	1	0	1
4	Seychelles	0	0	1	1
4	Uganda	0	0	1	1
Totals (5 entries)		5	5	10	20
