= Annari Viljoen =

South African badminton player

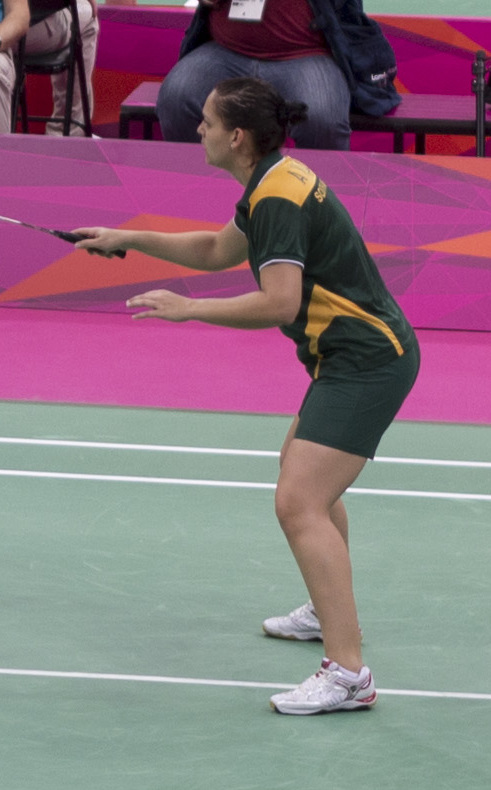

Personal information
- Born: 16 January 1987 (age 39) Bloemfontein, South Africa
- Height: 1.73 m (5 ft 8 in)
- Weight: 58 kg (128 lb)

Sport
- Country: South Africa
- Sport: Badminton

Women's singles & doubles
- Highest ranking: 258 (WS 16 December 2010); 40 (WD 22 March 2012); 99 (XD 3 May 2012)
- BWF profile
Medal record
Women's badminton
Representing South Africa
All-African Games
Gold medal – first place	2011 Maputo	Women's doubles
Gold medal – first place	2011 Maputo	Mixed doubles
Silver medal – second place	2011 Maputo	Mixed team
African Championships
Gold medal – first place	2009 Nairobi	Mixed team
Gold medal – first place	2010 Kampala	Women's doubles
Gold medal – first place	2011 Marrakesh	Women's doubles
Gold medal – first place	2011 Marrakesh	Mixed doubles
Gold medal – first place	2011 Marrakesh	Mixed team
Gold medal – first place	2012 Addis Ababa	Women's doubles
Silver medal – second place	2010 Kampala	Mixed doubles
Bronze medal – third place	2009 Nairobi	Women's doubles
Africa Team Championships
Gold medal – first place	2012 Addis Ababa	Women's team
Gold medal – first place	2010 Kampala	Women's team
Gold medal – first place	2008 Rose Hill	Women's team

Annari Viljoen (born 16 January 1987 in Bloemfontein) is a South African badminton player. In 2011, she won double title at the All-Africa Games in the women's and mixed doubles event, also won the silver medal in the team event. She competed at the 2012 Olympics in the doubles with Michelle Edwards, and made it to the quarter-finals.

== Achievements ==
=== All-Africa Games ===
Women's doubles
Year	Venue	Partner	Opponent	Score	Result
2011	Escola Josina Machel; Maputo, Mozambique	(South Africa) Stacey Doubell	(Seychelles) Allisen Camille (Seychelles) Cynthia Course	21–18, 21–15	Gold

Mixed doubles
Year	Venue	Partner	Opponent	Score	Result
2011	Escola Josina Machel; Maputo, Mozambique	(South Africa) Willem Viljoen	(Seychelles) Georgie Cupidon (Seychelles) Camille Allisen	22–20, 9–21, 21–16	Gold

=== African Championships ===
Women's doubles
Year	Venue	Partner	Opponent	Score	Result
2009	Moi International Sports Complex; Nairobi, Kenya	(South Africa) Michelle Edwards	(Nigeria) Grace Daniel (Nigeria) Mary Gideon	21–19, 10–21, 19–21	Bronze
2010	Sharing Youth Center; Kampala, Uganda	(South Africa) Michelle Edwards	(Nigeria) Maria Braimoh (Nigeria) Susan Ideh	21–6, 21–6	Gold
2011	Salle Couverte Zerktouni; Marrakesh, Morocco	(South Africa) Michelle Edwards	(Nigeria) Maria Braimoh (Nigeria) Susan Ideh	21–9, 21–16	Gold
2012	Arat Kilo Hall; Addis Ababa, Ethiopia	(South Africa) Michelle Edwards	(Nigeria) Grace Daniel (Nigeria) Susan Ideh	21–16, 21–19	Gold

Mixed doubles
Year	Venue	Partner	Opponent	Score	Result
2010	Sharing Youth Center; Kampala, Uganda	(South Africa) Roelof Dednam	(South Africa) Dorian James (South Africa) Michelle Edwards	13–21, 14–21	Silver
2011	Salle Couverte Zerktouni; Marrakesh, Morocco	(South Africa) Willem Viljoen	(South Africa) Dorian James (South Africa) Michelle Edwards	21–13, 21–12	Gold

=== BWF International Challenge/Series ===
Women's doubles
Year	Tournament	Partner	Opponent	Score	Result
2007	South Africa International	(South Africa) Jade Morgan	(South Africa) Chantal Botts (South Africa) Michelle Edwards	23–21, 21–18	(gold) Winner
2008	South Africa International	(South Africa) Jade Morgan	(South Africa) Chantal Botts (South Africa) Michelle Edwards	21–12, 21–16	(gold) Winner
2009	Kenya International	(South Africa) Michelle Edwards	(India) Dhanya Nair (India) Anita Ohlan	21–17, 15–21, 21–23	(silver) Runner-up
2009	South Africa International	(South Africa) Michelle Edwards	(Iran) Negin Amiripour (Iran) Sahar Zamanian	21–16, 21–14	(gold) Winner
2010	Uganda International	(South Africa) Michelle Edwards	(South Africa) Stacey Doubell (South Africa) Jade Morgan	14–21, 21–11, 21–18	(gold) Winner
2010	Kenya International	(South Africa) Michelle Edwards	(Nigeria) Maria Braimoh (Nigeria) Susan Ideh	21–10, 12–21, 21–10	(gold) Winner
2010	South Africa International	(South Africa) Michelle Edwards	(Turkey) Özge Bayrak (Turkey) Öznur Çalışkan	12–21, 15–21	(silver) Runner-up
2010	Botswana International	(South Africa) Michelle Edwards	(South Africa) Stacey Doubell (South Africa) Jade Morgan	21–12, 21–15	(gold) Winner
2011	Mauritius International	(South Africa) Michelle Edwards	(Canada) Nicole Grether (Canada) Charmaine Reid	10–21, 7–21	(silver) Runner-up
2011	Kenya International	(South Africa) Michelle Edwards	(Turkey) Özge Bayrak (Turkey) Neslihan Yiğit	15–21, 19–21	(silver) Runner-up
2011	Botswana International	(South Africa) Michelle Edwards	(South Africa) Michelle Butler-Emmett (South Africa) Stacey Doubell	21–12, 21–14	(gold) Winner
2011	South Africa International	(South Africa) Michelle Edwards	(Turkey) Özge Bayrak (Turkey) Neslihan Yiğit	10–21, 15–21	(silver) Runner-up
2012	Uganda International	(South Africa) Michelle Edwards	(Turkey) Özge Bayrak (Turkey) Neslihan Yiğit	Walkover	(gold) Winner
2012	South Africa International	(South Africa) Michelle Edwards	(Mauritius) Shama Aboobakar (South Africa) Stacey Doubell	21–19, 15–21, 21–13	(gold) Winner

Mixed doubles
Year	Tournament	Partner	Opponent	Score	Result
2007	South Africa International	(South Africa) Chris Dednam	(South Africa) Willem Viljoen (South Africa) Jade Morgan	21–14, 12–21, 21–15	(gold) Winner
2008	Mauritius International	(South Africa) Chris Dednam	(South Africa) Dorian James (South Africa) Michelle Edwards	16–21, 21–15, 11–21	(silver) Runner-up
2009	Kenya International	(South Africa) Willem Viljoen	(South Africa) Chris Dednam (South Africa) Michelle Edwards	11–21, 13–21	(silver) Runner-up
2010	Kenya International	(South Africa) Willem Viljoen	(Nigeria) Jinkan Ifraimu (Nigeria) Susan Ideh	21–12, 21–10	(gold) Winner
2010	South Africa International	(South Africa) Chris Dednam	(South Africa) Dorian James (South Africa) Michelle Edwards	14–21, 21–10, 21–13	(gold) Winner
2011	South Africa International	(South Africa) Chris Dednam	(South Africa) Enrico James (South Africa) Stacey Doubell	22–20, 11–21, 21–14	(gold) Winner
2012	Uganda International	(South Africa) Willem Viljoen	(South Africa) Dorian James (South Africa) Michelle Edwards	21–7, 21–10	(gold) Winner
2012	South Africa International	(South Africa) Willem Viljoen	(South Africa) Dorian James (South Africa) Michelle Edwards	21–15, 16–21, 21–12	(gold) Winner
2014	Botswana International	(South Africa) Willem Viljoen	(Slovakia) Matej Hliničan (Uganda) Shamim Bangi	21–14, 21–15	(gold) Winner

BWF International Challenge tournament
BWF International Series tournament
BWF Future Series tournament
