= Michelle Butler-Emmett =

South African badminton player (born 1983)

Personal information
- Born: 4 March 1983 (age 43) Durban, South Africa
- Height: 1.67 m (5 ft 6 in)
- Weight: 63 kg (139 lb)

Sport
- Country: South Africa
- Sport: Badminton

Women's singles & doubles
- Highest ranking: 177 (WS 3 May 2012); 97 (WD 30 November 2017); 117 (XD 24 March 2016)
- BWF profile
Medal record
Women's badminton
Representing South Africa
All-Africa Games
Silver medal – second place	2011 Maputo	Mixed team
Silver medal – second place	2015 Brazzaville	Mixed doubles
Silver medal – second place	2015 Brazzaville	Mixed team
African Championships
Gold medal – first place	2011 Marrakesh	Mixed team
Gold medal – first place	2013 Rose Hill	Mixed doubles
Gold medal – first place	2013 Rose Hill	Mixed team
Gold medal – first place	2014 Gaborone	Mixed doubles
Gold medal – first place	2014 Gaborone	Mixed team
Gold medal – first place	2017 Benoni	Women's doubles
Silver medal – second place	2017 Benoni	Mixed team
Bronze medal – third place	2012 Addis Ababa	Women's doubles
Bronze medal – third place	2013 Rose Hill	Women's singles
Bronze medal – third place	2013 Rose Hill	Women's doubles
Bronze medal – third place	2020 Cairo	Women's doubles
Africa Team Championships
Gold medal – first place	2012 Addis Ababa	Women's team

Michelle Butler-Emmett (born 4 March 1983) is a South African badminton player. She was the All-Africa Games silver medalists in the mixed doubles in 2015 and in the team event in 2011 and 2015. Butler-Emmett won the African Championships in the mixed doubles in 2013 and 2014, also in the women's doubles in 2017.

== Achievements ==
=== All-Africa Games ===
Mixed doubles
Year	Venue	Partner	Opponent	Score	Result
2015	Gymnase Étienne Mongha; Brazzaville, Republic of the Congo	(South Africa) Willem Viljoen	(South Africa) Andries Malan (South Africa) Jennifer Fry	17–21, 21–23	Silver

=== African Championships ===
Women's singles
Year	Venue	Opponent	Score	Result
2013	National Badminton Centre, Rose Hill, Mauritius	(Nigeria) Grace Gabriel	9–21, 19–21	Bronze

Women's doubles
Year	Venue	Partner	Opponent	Score	Result
2020	Cairo Stadium Hall 2 Cairo, Egypt	(South Africa) Amy Ackerman	(Nigeria) Dorcas Ajoke Adesokan (Nigeria) Uchechukwu Deborah Ukeh	21–19, 8–21, 11–21	Bronze
2017	John Barrable Hall; Benoni, South Africa	(South Africa) Jennifer Fry	(Egypt) Doha Hany (Egypt) Hadia Hosny	21–12, 15–21, 21–12	Gold
2013	National Badminton Centre; Rose Hill, Mauritius	(South Africa) Jennifer Fry	(Mauritius) Shama Aboobakar (Mauritius) Yeldy Louison	17–21, 14–21	Bronze
2012	Arat Kilo Hall; Addis Ababa, Ethiopia	(South Africa) Stacey Doubell	(Nigeria) Grace Daniel (Nigeria) Susan F Ideh	19–21, 21–14, 22–24	Bronze

Mixed doubles
Year	Venue	Partner	Opponent	Score	Result
2014	Lobatse Stadium; Gaborone, Botswana	(South Africa) Willem Viljoen	(South Africa) Andries Malan (South Africa) Jennifer Fry	21–18, 21–17	Gold
2013	National Badminton Centre; Rose Hill, Mauritius	(South Africa) Willem Viljoen	(South Africa) Andries Malan (South Africa) Jennifer Fry	21–18, 20–22, 21–9	Gold

=== BWF International Challenge/Series (8 titles, 4 runners-up) ===
Women's doubles
Year	Tournament	Partner	Opponent	Score	Result
2019	Botswana International	(South Africa) Kerry-Lee Harrington	(South Africa) Megan de Beer (South Africa) Johanita Scholtz	18–21, 20–22	(silver) Runner-up
2018	South Africa International	(South Africa) Jennifer Fry	(South Africa) Lehandre Schoeman (South Africa) Johanita Scholtz	17–21, 16–21	(silver) Runner-up
2018	Botswana International	(South Africa) Jennifer Fry	(Botswana) Tessa Kabelo (Botswana) Tebogo Ndzinge	21–7, 21–9	(gold) Winner
2017	South Africa International	(South Africa) Jennifer Fry	(South Africa) Demi Botha (South Africa) Lee-Ann De Wet	21–17, 21–19	(gold) Winner
2017	Botswana International	(South Africa) Jennifer Fry	(Italy) Silvia Garino (Italy) Lisa Iversen	26–24, 21–16	(gold) Winner
2016	South Africa International	(South Africa) Jennifer Fry	(South Africa) Elme de Villiers (South Africa) Sandra Le Grange	21–15, 21–16	(gold) Winner
2014	Zambia International	(South Africa) Elme de Villiers	(Nigeria) Grace Gabriel (Mauritius) Kate Foo Kune	21–17, 19–21, 21–17	(gold) Winner
2013	South Africa International	(South Africa) Sandra Le Grange	(South Africa) Elme de Villiers (Serbia) Sandra Halilovic	14–21, 13–21	(silver) Runner-up
2011	Botswana International	(South Africa) Stacey Doubell	(South Africa) Annari Viljoen (South Africa) Michelle Edwards	12–21, 14–21	(silver) Runner-up
2011	Namibia International	(South Africa) Stacey Doubell	(Egypt) Hadia Hosny (Morocco) Rajae Rochdy	21–14, 21–9	(gold) Winner

Mixed doubles
Year	Tournament	Partner	Opponent	Score	Result
2014	South Africa International	(South Africa) Cameron Coetzer	(South Africa) Prakash Vijayanath (South Africa) Stacey Doubell	25–23, 19–21, 21–15	(gold) Winner
2013	Mauritius International	(South Africa) Willem Viljoen	(Seychelles) Georgie Cupidon (Seychelles) Allisen Camille	21–12, 21–13	(gold) Winner

BWF International Challenge tournament
BWF International Series tournament
BWF Future Series tournament
