= Enrico James =

South African badminton player (born 1985)

Personal information
- Born: 12 April 1985 (age 41)

Sport
- Country: South Africa
- Sport: Badminton

Men's singles & doubles
- Highest ranking: 323 (MS 11 March 2010); 175 (MD 22 November 2012); 144 (XD 17 May 2012)
- BWF profile
Medal record
Men's badminton
Representing South Africa
All-Africa Games
Silver medal – second place	2011 Maputo	Mixed team
Bronze medal – third place	2011 Maputo	Mixed doubles
African Championships
Silver medal – second place	2012 Addis Ababa	Mixed doubles
Bronze medal – third place	2012 Addis Ababa	Men's doubles
Africa Team Championships
Gold medal – first place	2012 Addis Ababa	Men's team
Silver medal – second place	2008 Rose Hill	Men's team

Enrico James (born 12 April 1985) is a South African badminton player. In 2011, he won the bronze medal at the All-Africa Games in the mixed doubles event partnered with Stacey Doubell. In 2012, he won the bronze and silver medal in the men's and mixed doubles respectively at the African Championships in Addis Ababa, Ethiopia.

== Achievements ==
=== All-Africa Games ===
Mixed doubles

Year	Venue	Partner	Opponent	Score	Result
2011	Escola Josina Machel, Maputo, Mozambique	(South Africa) Stacey Doubell	(Seychelles) Georgie Cupidon (Seychelles) Allisen Camille	19–21, 15–21	Bronze

=== African Championships ===
Men's doubles

Year	Venue	Partner	Opponent	Score	Result
2012	Arat Kilo Hall, Addis Ababa, Ethiopia	(South Africa) Chris Dednam	(Nigeria) Jinkan Bulus (Nigeria) Ola Fagbemi	8–21 19–21	Bronze

Mixed doubles

Year	Venue	Partner	Opponent	Score	Result
2012	Arat Kilo Hall, Addis Ababa, Ethiopia	(South Africa) Stacey Doubell	(South Africa) Dorian James (South Africa) Michelle Claire Edwards	16–21, 6–21	Silver

=== BWF International Challenge/Series ===
Men's doubles

Year	Tournament	Partner	Opponent	Score	Result
2012	South Africa International	(South Africa) Dorian Lance James	(South Africa) Andries Malan (South Africa) Willem Viljoen	22–24, 21–9, 22–24	(gold) Winner
2011	South Africa International	(South Africa) Chris Dednam	(South Africa) Dorian James (South Africa) Willem Viljoen	19–21, 18–21	(silver) Runner-up
2010	Botswana International	(South Africa) Jacob Maliekal	(South Africa) Dorian James (South Africa) Willem Viljoen	19–21, 10–21	(silver) Runner-up

Mixed doubles

Year	Tournament	Partner	Opponent	Score	Result
2011	South Africa International	(South Africa) Stacey Doubell	(South Africa) Chris Dednam (South Africa) Annari Viljoen	20–22, 21–11, 14–21	(silver) Runner-up
2010	Botswana International	(South Africa) Stacey Doubell	(South Africa) Dorian James (South Africa) Michelle Claire Edwards	19–21, 11–21	(silver) Runner-up

BWF International Challenge tournament
BWF International Series tournament
BWF Future Series tournament
