= Michelle Claire Edwards =

South African badminton player (born 1974)

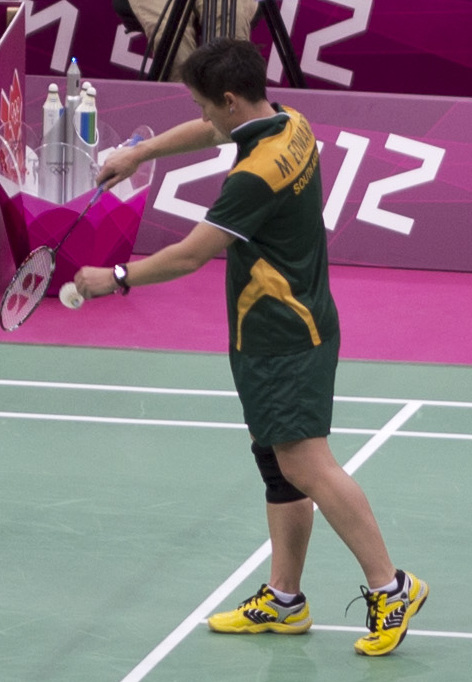

Personal information
- Born: 11 July 1974 (age 52) Durban, KwaZulu-Natal, South Africa
- Height: 1.55 m (5 ft 1 in)
- Weight: 58 kg (128 lb)

Sport
- Country: South Africa
- Sport: Badminton

Women's singles & doubles
- Highest ranking: 300 (WS 26 August 2010); 40 (WD 22 March 2012); 51 (XD 14 July 2011)
- BWF profile
Medal record
Women's badminton
Representing South Africa
All-Africa Games
Gold medal – first place	2003 Abuja	Women's doubles
Gold medal – first place	2003 Abuja	Mixed team
Gold medal – first place	2007 Algiers	Women's doubles
Silver medal – second place	2003 Abuja	Women's singles
Silver medal – second place	2003 Abuja	Mixed doubles
Silver medal – second place	2007 Algiers	Women's singles
Silver medal – second place	2007 Algiers	Mixed team
Bronze medal – third place	2007 Algiers	Mixed doubles
African Championships
Gold medal – first place	1998 Rose Hill	Mixed doubles
Gold medal – first place	2002 Casablanca	Women's doubles
Gold medal – first place	2002 Casablanca	Mixed team
Gold medal – first place	2004 Rose Hill	Women's singles
Gold medal – first place	2004 Rose Hill	Women's doubles
Gold medal – first place	2004 Rose Hill	Mixed team
Gold medal – first place	2006 Algiers	Women's doubles
Gold medal – first place	2006 Algiers	Mixed team
Gold medal – first place	2007 Rose Hill	Women's doubles
Gold medal – first place	2009 Nairobi	Mixed team
Gold medal – first place	2010 Kampala	Women's doubles
Gold medal – first place	2010 Kampala	Mixed doubles
Gold medal – first place	2011 Marrakesh	Women's doubles
Gold medal – first place	2011 Marrakesh	Mixed team
Gold medal – first place	2012 Addis Ababa	Women's doubles
Gold medal – first place	2012 Addis Ababa	Mixed doubles
Silver medal – second place	1998 Rose Hill	Women's singles
Silver medal – second place	1998 Rose Hill	Women's doubles
Silver medal – second place	2006 Algiers	Mixed doubles
Silver medal – second place	2007 Rose Hill	Mixed doubles
Silver medal – second place	2007 Rose Hill	Mixed team
Silver medal – second place	2011 Marrakesh	Mixed doubles
Bronze medal – third place	2002 Casablanca	Women's singles
Bronze medal – third place	2002 Casablanca	Mixed doubles
Bronze medal – third place	2004 Rose Hill	Mixed doubles
Bronze medal – third place	2009 Nairobi	Women's doubles
Africa Team Championships
Gold medal – first place	2008 Rose Hill	Women's team
Gold medal – first place	2010 Kampala	Women's team
Gold medal – first place	2012 Addis Ababa	Women's team

Michelle Claire Edwards (born 11 July 1974) is a South African badminton player.

== Career ==
Edwards played badminton at the 2004 Summer Olympics, losing to Aparna Popat of India in the round of 32 in the women's singles. In the women's doubles, Edwards and her partner Chantal Botts were defeated by Nicole Grether and Juliane Schenk of Germany in the round of 32.

In 2007, she won 3 medals in badminton at the 2007 All-Africa Games, a gold medal in women's doubles with Chantal Botts, a silver medal in women's singles, and a bronze medal in mixed doubles.

She also participated in the Summer Olympic Games of 2008 and 2012 in the women's doubles event. At the 2008 Summer Olympics she competed with Chantal Botts, they lost to Taipei in the first round. In the 2012 Summer Olympics, her partner was Annari Viljoen. Together, they reached the quarter-finals, where they lost to the Russian pair of Valeria Sorokina and Nina Vislova.

== Achievements ==
=== All African Games ===
Women's singles
Year	Venue	Opponent	Score	Result
2003	Indoor Sports Halls National Stadium, Abuja, Nigeria	(Nigeria) Grace Daniel		Silver
2007	Salle OMS El Biar, Algiers, Algeria	(Nigeria) Grace Daniel	16–21, 14–21	Silver

Women's doubles
Year	Venue	Partner	Opponent	Score	Result
2003	Indoor Sports Halls National Stadium; Abuja, Nigeria	(South Africa) Chantal Botts	(Nigeria) Grace Daniel (Nigeria) Susan Ideh		Gold
2007	Salle OMS El Biar; Algiers, Algeria	(South Africa) Chantal Botts	(Nigeria) Grace Daniel (Nigeria) Susan Ideh	21–12, 9–21, 22–20	Gold

Mixed doubles
Year	Venue	Partner	Opponent	Score	Result
2003	Indoor Sports Halls National Stadium; Abuja, Nigeria	(South Africa) Stewart Carson	(South Africa) Chris Dednam (South Africa) Antoinette Uys		Silver
2007	Salle OMS El Biar; Algiers, Algeria	(South Africa) Roelof Dednam	(Seychelles) Georgie Cupidon (Seychelles) Juliette Ah-Wan	17–21, 21–19, 13–21	Bronze

=== African Championships ===
Women's singles
Year	Venue	Opponent	Score	Result
1998	Rose Hill, Mauritius	(South Africa) Lina Fourie	11–2, 8–11, 7–11	Silver
2002	Mohammed V Indoor Sport Complex, Casablanca, Morocco	(Seychelles) Juliette Ah-Wan	4–7, 4–7, 4–7	Bronze
2004	National Badminton Centre, Rose Hill, Mauritius	(South Africa) Chantal Botts	11–4, 11–2	Gold

Women's doubles
Year	Venue	Partner	Opponent	Score	Result
1998	Rose Hill, Mauritius	(South Africa) Meagen Burnett	(South Africa) Monique Ric-Hansen (South Africa) Lina Fourie	2–15, 14–17	Silver
2002	Mohammed V Indoor Sport Complex; Casablanca, Morocco	(South Africa) Chantal Botts	(Nigeria) Miriam Sude (Nigeria) Grace Daniel		Gold
2004	National Badminton Centre; Rose Hill, Mauritius	(South Africa) Chantal Botts	(Nigeria) Miriam Sude (Nigeria) Grace Daniel		Gold
2006	Salle OMS El Biar; Algiers, Algeria	(South Africa) Stacey Doubell	(Seychelles) Juliette Ah-Wan (Seychelles) Catherina Paulin	21–12, 23–21	Gold
2007	Stadium Badminton Rose Hill; Rose Hill, Mauritius	(South Africa) Chantal Botts	(Nigeria) Grace Daniel (Mauritius) Karen Foo Kune	21–19, 21–12	Gold
2009	Moi International Sports Complex; Nairobi, Kenya	(South Africa) Annari Viljoen	(Nigeria) Grace Daniel (Nigeria) Mary Gideon	21–19, 10–21, 19–21	Bronze
2010	Sharing Youth Center; Kampala, Uganda	(South Africa) Annari Viljoen	(Nigeria) Maria Braimoh (Nigeria) Susan Ideh	21–6, 21–6	Gold
2011	Salle Couverte Zerktouni; Marrakesh, Morocco	(South Africa) Annari Viljoen	(Nigeria) Maria Braimoh (Nigeria) Susan Ideh	21–9, 21–16	Gold
2012	Arat Kilo Hall; Addis Ababa, Ethiopia	(South Africa) Annari Viljoen	(Nigeria) Grace Daniel (Nigeria) Susan Ideh	21–16, 21–19	Gold

Mixed doubles
Year	Venue	Partner	Opponent	Score	Result
1998	Rose Hill, Mauritius	(South Africa) Anton Kriel	(South Africa) Johan Kleingeld (South Africa) Lina Fourie	15–11, 15–0	Gold
2002	Mohammed V Indoor Sport Complex; Casablanca, Morocco	(South Africa) Dorian James	(South Africa) Johan Kleingeld (South Africa) Chantal Botts	4–7, 4–7, 4–7	Bronze
2004	National Badminton Centre; Rose Hill, Mauritius	(South Africa) Dorian James	(Nigeria) Greg Okuonghae (Nigeria) Grace Daniel	15–6, 9–15, 8–15	Bronze
2006	Salle OMS El Biar; Algiers, Algeria	(South Africa) Dorian James	(Seychelles) Georgie Cupidon (Seychelles) Juliette Ah-Wan	16–21, 21–17, 16–21	Silver
2007	Stadium Badminton Rose Hill; Rose Hill, Mauritius	(South Africa) Chris Dednam	(Seychelles) Georgie Cupidon (Seychelles) Juliette Ah-Wan	16–21, 21–11, 15–21	Silver
2010	Sharing Youth Center; Kampala, Uganda	(South Africa) Dorian James	(South Africa) Roeloff Dednam (South Africa) Annari Viljoen	21–13, 21–14	Gold
2011	Salle Couverte Zerktouni; Marrakesh, Morocco	(South Africa) Dorian James	(South Africa) Willem Viljoen (South Africa) Annari Viljoen	13–21, 12–21	Silver
2012	Arat Kilo Hall; Addis Ababa, Ethiopia	(South Africa) Dorian James	(South Africa) Enrico James (South Africa) Stacey Doubel	21–16, 21–6	Gold

=== BWF International Challenge/Series ===
Women's singles
Year	Tournament	Opponent	Score	Result
1996	South Africa International	(South Africa) Annalize van Staden	11–7, 11–4	(gold) Winner
1997	South Africa International	(South Africa) Lina Fourie	11–6, 3–11, 11–6	(gold) Winner
1997	Mauritius International	(England) Wendy Taylor	4–11, 11–7, 11–6	(gold) Winner
1998	South Africa International	(South Africa) Lina Fourie	10–13, 4–11	(silver) Runner-up
2000	South Africa International	(South Africa) Chantal Botts	11–4, 11–0	(gold) Winner
2001	South Africa International	(Mauritius) Amrita Sawaram	11–0, 11–7	(gold) Winner
2001	Mauritius International	(Mauritius) Amrita Sawaram	7–1, 7–2, 7–5	(gold) Winner
2002	South Africa International	(Seychelles) Catherina Paulin	7–7, 7–2, 7–0	(gold) Winner
2002	Mauritius International	(Mauritius) Amrita Sawaram	11–1, 11–3	(gold) Winner
2009	South Africa International	(Iran) Negin Amiripour	21–15, 21–18	(gold) Winner

Women's doubles
Year	Tournament	Partner	Opponent	Score	Result
1995	Mauritius International	(South Africa) Meagen Burnett	(England) Rebecca Pantaney (England) Justine Willmott	15–0, 5–15, 15–10	(gold) Winner
1997	South Africa International	(South Africa) Meagen Burnett	(South Africa) Lina Fourie (South Africa) Tracey Thompson	12–15, 8–15	(silver) Runner-up
1997	Mauritius International	(South Africa) Meagen Burnett	(Scotland) Kirsteen McEwan (England) Wendy Taylor	5–15, 10–15	(silver) Runner-up
1998	South Africa International	(South Africa) Meagen Burnett	(South Africa) Karen Coetzer (South Africa) Lina Fourie	15–4, 15–11	(gold) Winner
2001	South Africa International	(South Africa) Chantal Botts	(South Africa) Marika Daubern (South Africa) Beverley Meerholz	15–1, 15–13	(gold) Winner
2002	South Africa International	(South Africa) Chantal Botts	(South Africa) Marika Daubern (South Africa) Antoinette Uys	7–2, 8–6, 7–2	(gold) Winner
2005	South Africa International	(South Africa) Chantal Botts	(Mauritius) Shama Aboobakar (Mauritius) Amrita Sawaram	15–5, 15–7	(gold) Winner
2007	South Africa International	(South Africa) Chantal Botts	(South Africa) Jade Morgan (South Africa) Annari Viljoen	21–23, 18–21	(silver) Runner-up
2007	Mauritius International	(South Africa) Chantal Botts	(Slovenia) Maja Tvrdy (Portugal) Ana Moura	16–21, 18–21	(silver) Runner-up
2008	Mauritius International	(South Africa) Chantal Botts	(South Africa) Kerry-Lee Harrington (South Africa) Stacey Doubell	21–7, 17–21, 21–14	(gold) Winner
2008	Kenya International	(South Africa) Chantal Botts		21–14, 21–8	(gold) Winner
2008	South Africa International	(South Africa) Chantal Botts	(South Africa) Jade Morgan (South Africa) Annari Viljoen	12–21, 16–21	(silver) Runner-up
2009	Kenya International	(South Africa) Annari Viljoen	(India) Dhanya Nair (India) Anita Ohlan	21–17, 15–21, 21–23	(silver) Runner-up
2009	South Africa International	(South Africa) Annari Viljoen	(Iran) Negin Amiripour (Iran) Sahar Zamanian	21–16, 21–14	(gold) Winner
2010	Uganda International	(South Africa) Annari Viljoen	(South Africa) Stacey Doubell (South Africa) Jade Morgan	14–21, 21–11, 21–18	(gold) Winner
2010	Kenya International	(South Africa) Annari Viljoen	(Nigeria) Maria Braimoh (Nigeria) Susan Ideh	21–10, 12–21, 21–10	(gold) Winner
2010	South Africa International	(South Africa) Annari Viljoen	(Turkey) Özge Bayrak (Turkey) Öznur Çalışkan	12–21, 15–21	(silver) Runner-up
2010	Botswana International	(South Africa) Annari Viljoen	(South Africa) Stacey Doubell (South Africa) Jade Morgan	21–12, 21–15	(gold) Winner
2011	Mauritius International	(South Africa) Annari Viljoen	(Canada) Nicole Grether (Canada) Charmaine Reid	10–21, 7–21	(silver) Runner-up
2011	Kenya International	(South Africa) Annari Viljoen	(Turkey) Özge Bayrak (Turkey) Neslihan Yiğit	15–21, 19–21	(silver) Runner-up
2011	Botswana International	(South Africa) Annari Viljoen	(South Africa) Michelle Butler-Emmett (South Africa) Stacey Doubell	21–12, 21–14	(gold) Winner
2011	South Africa International	(South Africa) Annari Viljoen	(Turkey) Özge Bayrak (Turkey) Neslihan Yiğit	10–21, 15–21	(silver) Runner-up
2012	Uganda International	(South Africa) Annari Viljoen	(Turkey) Özge Bayrak (Turkey) Neslihan Yiğit	Walkover	(gold) Winner
2012	South Africa International	(South Africa) Annari Viljoen	(Mauritius) Shama Aboobakar (South Africa) Stacey Doubell	21–19, 15–21, 21–13	(gold) Winner

Mixed doubles
Year	Tournament	Partner	Opponent	Score	Result
1996	South Africa International	(South Africa) Johan Kleingeld	(South Africa) Alex Nel (South Africa) Annalize van Staden	15–5, 15–8	(gold) Winner
1999	Botswana International	(South Africa) Anton Kriel	(Botswana) Jose John (Botswana) Niru Singhal	15–0, 15–4	(gold) Winner
2000	South Africa International	(South Africa) Anton Kriel	(South Africa) Johan Kleingeld (South Africa) Karen Coetzer	3–15, 15–12, 15–5	(gold) Winner
2005	South Africa International	(South Africa) Dorian James	(Nigeria) Greg Okuonghae (Nigeria) Grace Daniel	13–15, 15–12, 15–13	(gold) Winner
2007	Mauritius International	(South Africa) Chris Dednam	(Seychelles) Georgie Cupidon (Seychelles) Juliette Ah-Wan	21–9, 21–17	(gold) Winner
2008	Mauritius International	(South Africa) Dorian James	(South Africa) Chris Dednam (South Africa) Annari Viljoen	21–16, 15–21, 21–11	(gold) Winner
2008	South Africa International	(South Africa) Chris Dednam	(Mauritius) Stephan Beeharry (Mauritius) Shama Aboobakar	21–17, 21–12	(gold) Winner
2009	Kenya International	(South Africa) Chris Dednam	(South Africa) Dorian James (South Africa) Annari Viljoen	21–11, 21–13	(gold) Winner
2009	South Africa International	(South Africa) Dorian James	(South Africa) Willem Viljoen (South Africa) Jade Morgan	21–11, 21–17	(gold) Winner
2010	Uganda International	(South Africa) Dorian James	(Greece) Georgios Charalambidis (Greece) Anne Hald Jensen	14–21, 21–19, 21–7	(gold) Winner
2010	South Africa International	(South Africa) Dorian James	(South Africa) Chris Dednam (South Africa) Annari Viljoen	21–14, 10–21, 13–21	(silver) Runner-up
2010	Botswana International	(South Africa) Dorian James	(South Africa) Enrico James (South Africa) Stacey Doubell	21–19, 21–11	(gold) Winner
2011	Mauritius International	(South Africa) Dorian James	(Egypt) Abdelrahman Kashkal (Egypt) Hadia Hosny	21–16, 21–11	(gold) Winner
2011	Kenya International	(South Africa) Dorian James	(Vietnam) Lê Hà Anh (Vietnam) Lê Thu Huyền	25–23, 14–21, 19–21	(silver) Runner-up
2011	Botswana International	(South Africa) Dorian James	(Nigeria) Ola Fagbemi (Nigeria) Susan Ideh	21–16, 11–21, 21–19	(gold) Winner
2012	Uganda International	(South Africa) Dorian James	(South Africa) Willem Viljoen (South Africa) Annari Viljoen	7–21, 10–21	(silver) Runner-up
2012	South Africa International	(South Africa) Dorian James	(South Africa) Willem Viljoen (South Africa) Annari Viljoen	15–21, 21–16, 12–21	(silver) Runner-up

BWF International Challenge tournament
BWF International Series tournament
BWF Future Series tournament
