= Willem Viljoen =

South African badminton player (born 1985)

Personal information
- Born: Willem Abraham Viljoen; 5 March 1985 (age 41) Bloemfontein, South Africa
- Height: 1.82 m (6 ft 0 in)
- Weight: 79 kg (174 lb)

Sport
- Country: South Africa
- Sport: Badminton

Men's
- Highest ranking: 182 (MS) 23 Dec 2010; 46 (MD) 7 June 2012; 99 (XD) 3 May 2012
- BWF profile
Medal record
Badminton
Representing South Africa
All-Africa Games
Gold medal – first place	2015 Brazzaville	Men's doubles
Gold medal – first place	2011 Maputo	Mixed doubles
Silver medal – second place	2015 Brazzaville	Mixed doubles
Silver medal – second place	2015 Brazzaville	Mixed team
Silver medal – second place	2011 Maputo	Men's doubles
Silver medal – second place	2011 Maputo	Mixed team
Silver medal – second place	2007 Algiers	Men's doubles
Silver medal – second place	2007 Algiers	Mixed team
African Championships
Gold medal – first place	2014 Gaborone	Men's doubles
Gold medal – first place	2014 Gaborone	Mixed doubles
Gold medal – first place	2014 Gaborone	Mixed team
Gold medal – first place	2013 Rose Hill	Men's doubles
Gold medal – first place	2013 Rose Hill	Mixed doubles
Gold medal – first place	2013 Rose Hill	Mixed team
Gold medal – first place	2012 Addis Ababa	Men's doubles
Gold medal – first place	2011 Marrakesh	Men's doubles
Gold medal – first place	2011 Marrakesh	Mixed doubles
Gold medal – first place	2011 Marrakesh	Mixed team
Gold medal – first place	2006 Algiers	Mixed team
Silver medal – second place	2006 Algiers	Men's doubles
Bronze medal – third place	2011 Marrakesh	Men's singles
Bronze medal – third place	2010 Kampala	Men's doubles
Bronze medal – third place	2010 Kampala	Mixed doubles
Bronze medal – third place	2006 Algiers	Men's singles
Africa Team Championships
Gold medal – first place	2016 Rose Hill	Men's team
Gold medal – first place	2012 Addis Ababa	Men's team
Gold medal – first place	2006 Rose Hill	Men's team
Silver medal – second place	2008 Rose Hill	Men's team
Bronze medal – third place	2010 Kampala	Men's team

Willem Abraham Viljoen (born 5 March 1985) is a South African badminton player. He competed for South Africa at the 2012 London Summer Olympics, and at the Glasgow 2014 Commonwealth Games. At the All-African Games, he has collected 2 golds and six silvers. Her sister Annari Viljoen also the Olympian who was competed in London 2012.

== Achievements ==
=== All African Games ===
Men's doubles
Year	Venue	Partner	Opponent	Score	Result
2015	Gymnase Étienne Mongha; Brazzaville, Republic of the Congo	(South Africa) Andries Malan	(Egypt) Ali Ahmed El Khateeb (Egypt) Abdelrahman Kashkal	21–10, 21–13	Gold
2011	Escola Josina Machel; Maputo, Mozambique	(South Africa) Dorian James	(Nigeria) Ola Fagbemi (Nigeria) Jinkan Ifraimu	18–21, 19–21	Silver
2007	Salle OMS El Biar; Algiers, Algeria	(South Africa) Dorian James	(South Africa) Chris Dednam (South Africa) Roelof Dednam	10–21, 15–21	Silver

Mixed doubles
Year	Venue	Partner	Opponent	Score	Result
2015	Gymnase Étienne Mongha; Brazzaville, Republic of the Congo	(South Africa) Michelle Butler-Emmett	(South Africa) Andries Malan (South Africa) Jennifer Fry	17–21, 21–23	Silver
2011	Escola Josina Machel; Maputo, Mozambique	(South Africa) Annari Viljoen	(Seychelles) Georgie Cupidon (Seychelles) Camille Allisen	22–20, 9–21, 21–16	Gold

=== African Championships ===
Men's singles
Year	Venue	Opponent	Score	Result
2011	Marrakesh, Morocco	(Nigeria) Ola Fagbemi	14–21, 17–21	Bronze
2006	Algiers, Algeria	(Zambia) Eli Mambwe		Bronze

Men's doubles
Year	Venue	Partner	Opponent	Score	Result
2014	Lobatse Stadium; Gaborone, Botswana	(South Africa) Andries Malan	(Nigeria) Enejoh Abah (Nigeria) Victor Makanju	21–8, 21–15	Gold
2013	National Badminton Centre; Beau Bassin-Rose Hill, Mauritius	(South Africa) Andries Malan	(Nigeria) Enejoh Abah (Nigeria) Victor Makanju	21–11, 21–12	Gold
2012	Arat Kilo Hall; Addis Ababa, Ethiopia	(South Africa) Dorian James	(Nigeria) Ola Fagbemi (Nigeria) Jinkan Ifraimu	21–15, 21–15	Gold
2011	Marrakesh, Morocco	(South Africa) Dorian James	(Nigeria) Ola Fagbemi (Nigeria) Jinkan Ifraimu	21–18, 21–14	Gold
2010	Kampala, Uganda	(South Africa) Dorian James	(Nigeria) Ola Fagbemi (Nigeria) Jinkan Ifraimu	15–21, 15–21	Bronze
2006	Algiers, Algeria	(South Africa) Dorian James	(South Africa) Chris Dednam (South Africa) Roelof Dednam		Silver

Mixed doubles
Year	Venue	Partner	Opponent	Score	Result
2014	Lobatse Stadium; Gaborone, Botswana	(South Africa) Michelle Butler Emmett	(South Africa) Andries Malan (South Africa) Jennifer Fry	21–18, 21–17	Gold
2013	National Badminton Centre; Beau Bassin-Rose Hill, Mauritius	(South Africa) Michelle Butler Emmett	(South Africa) Andries Malan (South Africa) Jennifer Fry	21–18, 20–22, 21–9	Gold
2011	Marrakesh, Morocco	(South Africa) Annari Viljoen	(South Africa) Dorian James (South Africa) Michelle Edwards	21–13, 21–12	Gold
2010	Kampala, Uganda	(South Africa) Jade Morgan	(South Africa) Dorian James (South Africa) Michelle Edwards	11–21, 12–21	Bronze

=== BWF International Challenge/Series (24 titles, 13 runners-up) ===
Men's singles
Year	Tournament	Opponent	Score	Result
2012	South Africa International	(Scotland) Alistair Casey	24–26, 22–20, 18–21	(silver) Runner-up
2010	Botswana International	(Italy) Giovanni Traina	20–22, 21–19, 18–21	(silver) Runner-up

Men's doubles
Year	Tournament	Partner	Opponent	Score	Result
2016	Rose Hill International	(South Africa) Andries Malan	(Algeria) Mohamed Abderrahime Belrabi (Algeria) Adel Hamek	21–18, 21–18	(gold) Winner
2015	Botswana International	(South Africa) Andries Malan	(Algeria) Mohamed Abderrahime Belrabi (Algeria) Adel Hamek	21–11, 21–8	(gold) Winner
2015	South Africa International	(South Africa) Andries Malan	(Iran) Vatannejad-Soroush Eskandari (Iran) Farzin Khanjani	21–17, 16–21, 18–21	(silver) Runner-up
2015	Zambia International	(South Africa) Andries Malan	(Egypt) Ali Ahmed El Khateeb (Egypt) Abdelrahman Kashkal	21–14, 21–15	(gold) Winner
2015	Ethiopia International	(South Africa) Andries Malan	(Turkey) Emre Vural (Turkey) Sinan Zorlu	21–10, 21–13	(gold) Winner
2015	Mauritius International	(South Africa) Andries Malan	(India) Shlok Ramchandran (India) Sanyam Shukla	19–21, 12–21	(silver) Runner-up
2014	Botswana International	(South Africa) Andries Malan	(Austria) Luka Wraber (Slovenia) Alen Roj	14–21, 21–10, 21–19	(gold) Winner
2014	Zambia International	(South Africa) Andries Malan	(Italy) Giovanni Greco (Italy) Rosario Maddaloni	14–21, 16–21	(silver) Runner-up
2014	Lagos International	(South Africa) Andries Malan	(Nigeria) Ola Fagbemi (Nigeria) Jinkan Ifraimu	21–14, 22–20	(gold) Winner
2014	Uganda International	(South Africa) Andries Malan	(Malaysia) Chong Chun Quan (Malaysia) Yeoh Seng Zoe	14–21, 21–11, 14–21	(silver) Runner-up
2013	Mauritius International	(South Africa) Andries Malan	(Mauritius) Denneshsing Baboolall (Mauritius) Julien Paul	21–11, 21–17	(gold) Winner
2012	South Africa International	(South Africa) Andries Malan	(South Africa) Dorian James (South Africa) Enrico James	24–22, 9–21, 24–22	(gold) Winner
2012	Uganda International	(South Africa) Dorian James	(Nigeria) Ola Fagbemi (Nigeria) Jinkan Ifraimu	24–22, 21–19	(gold) Winner
2011	South Africa International	(South Africa) Dorian James	(South Africa) Chris Dednam (South Africa) Enrico James	21–19, 21–18	(gold) Winner
2011	Botswana International	(South Africa) Dorian James	(Nigeria) Ola Fagbemi (Nigeria) Jinkan Ifraimu	21–23, 21–13, 15–21	(silver) Runner-up
2011	Namibia International	(South Africa) Dorian James	(Egypt) Ali Ahmed El-Khateeb (Egypt) Abdelrahman Kashkal	21–13, 21–13	(gold) Winner
2011	Kenya International	(South Africa) Dorian James	(India) Manu Attri (India) Jishnu Sanyal	14–21, 13–21	(silver) Runner-up
2011	Mauritius International	(South Africa) Dorian James	(India) Manu Attri (India) Jishnu Sanyal	19–21, 9–21	(silver) Runner-up
2010	Botswana International	(South Africa) Dorian James	(South Africa) Enrico James (South Africa) Jacobs Maliekal	21–19, 21–10	(gold) Winner
2010	South Africa International	(South Africa) Dorian James	(South Africa) Chris Dednam (South Africa) Roeloff Dednam	14–21, 18–21	(silver) Runner-up
2010	Kenya International	(South Africa) Dorian James	(Nigeria) Ola Fagbemi (Nigeria) Jinkan Ifraimu	22–20, 21–17	(gold) Winner
2010	Uganda International	(South Africa) Dorian James	(Nigeria) Ola Fagbemi (Nigeria) Jinkan Ifraimu	21–13, 21–9	(gold) Winner
2009	South Africa International	(South Africa) Dorian James	(Iran) Mohammadreza Kheradmani (Iran) Ali Shahhosseini	22–20, 17–21, 21–15	(gold) Winner
2009	Mauritius International	(South Africa) Dorian James	(Nigeria) Ola Fagbemi (Nigeria) Jinkan Ifraimu	19–21, 22–20, 21–8	(gold) Winner
2008	South Africa International	(South Africa) Dorian James	(South Africa) Chris Dednam (South Africa) Roelof Dednam	21–16, 21–17	(gold) Winner
2007	South Africa International	(South Africa) Dorian James	(South Africa) Chris Dednam (South Africa) Roelof Dednam	21–12, 21–18	(gold) Winner
2006	Mauritius International	(South Africa) Dorian James	(South Africa) Chris Dednam (South Africa) Roelof Dednam	21–13, 23–21	(gold) Winner

Mixed doubles
Year	Tournament	Partner	Opponent	Score	Result
2014	Botswana International	(South Africa) Annari Viljoen	(Slovakia) Matej Hliničan (Uganda) Shamim Bangi	21–14, 21–15	(gold) Winner
2013	Mauritius International	(South Africa) Michelle Butler-Emmett	(Seychelles) Georgie Cupidon (Seychelles) Allisen Camille	21–12, 21–13	(gold) Winner
2012	South Africa International	(South Africa) Annari Viljoen	(South Africa) Dorian James (South Africa) Michelle Edwards	21–15, 16–21, 21–12	(gold) Winner
2012	Uganda International	(South Africa) Annari Viljoen	(South Africa) Dorian James (South Africa) Michelle Edwards	21–7, 21–10	(gold) Winner
2010	Kenya International	(South Africa) Annari Viljoen	(Nigeria) Jinkan Ifraimu (Nigeria) Susan Ideh	21–12, 21–10	(gold) Winner
2009	South Africa International	(South Africa) Jade Morgan	(South Africa) Dorian James (South Africa) Michelle Edwards	11–21, 17–21	(silver) Runner-up
2009	Kenya International	(South Africa) Annari Viljoen	(South Africa) Chris Dednam (South Africa) Michelle Edwards	11–21, 13–21	(silver) Runner-up
2007	South Africa International	(South Africa) Jade Morgan	(South Africa) Chris Dednam (South Africa) Annari Viljoen	14–21, 21–12, 15–21	(silver) Runner-up

BWF International Challenge tournament
BWF International Series tournament
BWF Future Series tournament
