= 2008 Thomas & Uber Cup qualification =

The 2008 Thomas & Uber Cup qualification was held in February 2008 to determine another ten places for the men's and women's tournaments for the 2008 Thomas & Uber Cup along with China and Indonesia as defending champion and host. Each confederation held a qualifying tournament in a fixed venue to determine the places allocated.

== Africa ==
The tournament was held in Rose Hill, Mauritius, from February 18 to February 22, 2008, having moved from Kenya because of security concerns. The winner in the final was given a place in the final tournament.

=== Thomas Cup ===
==== Groups ====
===== Group A =====
Team	Pts	Pld	W	L	MF	MA	MD
South Africa	4	2	2	0	9	1	+8
Egypt	4	2	2	0	8	2	+6
Uganda	2	2	0	2	3	7	−4
Kenya	2	2	0	2	0	10	−10

South Africa	5–0	Kenya
Egypt	3–2	Uganda
South Africa	4–1	Uganda
Egypt	5–0	Kenya

===== Group B =====
Team	Pts	Pld	W	L	MF	MA	MD
Nigeria	4	2	2	0	8	2	+6
Mauritius	3	2	1	1	4	6	−2
Zambia	2	2	0	2	3	7	−4

Nigeria	4–1	Zambia
Mauritius	3–2	Zambia
Nigeria	4–1	Mauritius

==== Knockout stage ====
Semi-finals
South Africa	3
Mauritius	0
Nigeria	3
Egypt	1

Final
February 23
South Africa	0
Nigeria	3

=== Uber Cup ===
==== Group ====
Team	Pts	Pld	W	L	MF	MA	MD
Nigeria	6	3	3	0	13	2	+11
South Africa	5	3	2	1	11	4	+7
Mauritius	4	3	1	2	5	10	−5
Egypt	3	3	0	3	1	14	−13

Nigeria	5–0	Mauritius
South Africa	5–0	Egypt
Nigeria	3–2	South Africa
Mauritius	4–1	Egypt
South Africa	4–1	Mauritius
Nigeria	5–0	Egypt

==== Knockout stage ====
Semi-finals
Nigeria	3
Egypt	0
South Africa	3
Mauritius	1

Final
February 23
Nigeria	2
South Africa	3

== Asia ==
The tournament was held in Ho Chi Minh City, Vietnam, from February 18 to February 24, 2008. 14 teams participated in the men's event and 11 in the women's. The Hong Kong women's team went through to the final tournament based on a higher team ranking than Scotland.

=== Thomas Cup ===
==== Groups ====
===== Group A =====
Team	Pts	Pld	W	L	MF	MA	MD
Malaysia	3	3	3	0	15	0	+15
Chinese Taipei	2	3	2	1	10	5	+5
Philippines	1	3	1	2	5	10	−5
Cambodia	0	3	0	3	0	15	−15

February 20, 2008
Malaysia	5–0	Philippines
Chinese Taipei	5–0	Cambodia
Chinese Taipei	5–0	Philippines
Malaysia	5–0	Cambodia
February 21, 2008
Philippines	5–0	Cambodia
Malaysia	5–0	Chinese Taipei

===== Group B =====
Team	Pts	Pld	W	L	MF	MA	MD
South Korea	2	2	2	0	9	1	+8
Singapore	1	2	1	1	4	6	−2
Vietnam	0	2	0	2	2	8	−6

February 19, 2008
Singapore	4–1	Vietnam
February 20, 2008
South Korea	5–0	Singapore
February 21, 2008
South Korea	4–1	Vietnam

===== Group C =====
Team	Pts	Pld	W	L	MF	MA	MD
Japan	2	2	2	0	10	0	+10
India	1	2	1	1	5	5	0
Pakistan	0	2	0	2	0	10	−10

February 19, 2008
Japan	5–0	Pakistan
February 20, 2008
India	5–0	Pakistan
February 21, 2008
Japan	5–0	India

===== Group D =====
Team	Pts	Pld	W	L	MF	MA	MD
Thailand	3	3	3	0	14	1	+13
Hong Kong	2	3	2	1	11	4	+7
Sri Lanka	1	3	1	2	5	10	−5
Macau	0	3	0	3	0	15	−15

February 19, 2008
Hong Kong	5–0	Sri Lanka
Thailand	5–0	Macau
February 20, 2008
Thailand	5–0	Sri Lanka
Hong Kong	5–0	Macau
February 21, 2008
Sri Lanka	5–0	Macau
Hong Kong	1–4	Thailand

==== Knockout stage ====
Quarter-finals
February 22
Malaysia	3
India	0
February 22
Thailand	3
Singapore	0
February 22
Chinese Taipei	2
Japan	3
February 22
Hong Kong	0
South Korea	3

Semi-finals
February 23
Malaysia	3
Thailand	0
February 23
Japan	0
South Korea	3

Final
February 24
Malaysia	3
South Korea	2
Third place
February 24
Thailand	1
Japan	3

==== Classification ====
Preliminary
February 23
India	3
Singapore	2
February 23
Chinese Taipei	1
Hong Kong	3

Fifth Place
February 23
India	3
Hong Kong	0

=== Uber Cup ===
==== Groups ====
===== Group W =====
Team	Pts	Pld	W	L	MF	MA	MD
Japan	2	2	2	0	9	1	+8
Thailand	1	2	1	1	6	4	+2
Sri Lanka	0	2	0	2	0	10	−10

February 19, 2008
Japan	5–0	Sri Lanka
February 20, 2008
Thailand	5–0	Sri Lanka
February 21, 2008
Japan	4–1	Thailand

===== Group X =====
Team	Pts	Pld	W	L	MF	MA	MD
South Korea	2	2	2	0	10	0	+10
Singapore	1	2	1	1	5	5	0
Cambodia	0	2	0	2	0	10	−10

February 19, 2008
South Korea	5–0	Cambodia
February 20, 2008
Singapore	5–0	Cambodia
February 21, 2008
South Korea	5–0	Singapore

===== Group Y =====
Team	Pts	Pld	W	L	MF	MA	MD
Hong Kong	2	2	2	0	7	3	+4
Chinese Taipei	1	2	1	1	7	3	+4
Vietnam	0	2	0	2	1	9	−8

February 19, 2008
Chinese Taipei	5–0	Vietnam
February 20, 2008
Hong Kong	4–1	Vietnam
February 21, 2008
Chinese Taipei	2–3	Hong Kong

===== Group Z =====
Team	Pts	Pld	W	L	MF	MA	MD
Malaysia	1	1	1	0	4	1	+3
India	0	1	0	1	1	4	−3

February 21, 2008
Malaysia	4–1	India

==== Knockout stage ====
Quarter-finals
February 22
Japan	3
Chinese Taipei	1
February 22
Malaysia	3
Singapore	1
February 22
Thailand	0
Hong Kong	3
February 22
India	1
South Korea	3

Semi-finals
February 23
Japan	3
Malaysia	2
February 23
Hong Kong	1
South Korea	3

Final
February 24
Japan	1
South Korea	3
Third place
February 24
Malaysia	3
Hong Kong	0

==== Classification ====
Preliminary
February 23
Chinese Taipei	2
Singapore	3
February 23
Thailand	3
India	2

Fifth Place
February 24
Singapore	3
Thailand	2

== Europe ==
The 2008 European Men's and Women's Team Badminton Championships also served as qualification for the 2008 Thomas & Uber Cup. Denmark, England and Germany went through to the final tournament for men. In the women's competition, Denmark, Netherlands and Germany went through to the final tournament.

== Oceania ==
The tournament was held on February 8, 2008, in Nouméa, New Caledonia. Only two teams took part in the tournament, New Zealand and Australia. The winner won a place in the final tournament.

=== Thomas Cup ===
February 8, 2008
New Zealand	3–2	Australia

=== Uber Cup ===
February 8, 2008
New Zealand	3–0	Australia

== Americas ==
The tournament was held from February 16 to February 18, 2008, in Campinas, Brazil. Four teams participated: Brazil, Canada, Peru and the United States. The winner in the final went through to the final tournament.

=== Thomas Cup ===
==== Group ====
Team	Pts	Pld	W	L	MF	MA	MD
Canada	3	3	3	0	14	1	+13
United States	2	3	2	1	8	7	+1
Brazil	1	3	1	2	4	11	−7
Peru	0	3	0	3	4	11	−7

February 16, 2008
United States	3–2	Peru
Canada	5–0	Brazil
Canada	5–0	Peru
United States	4–1	Brazil
February 17, 2008
United States	1–4	Canada
Peru	2–3	Brazil

==== Classification ====
February 18, 2008
Brazil	1–3	Peru	Third place
Canada	3–0	United States	Final

=== Uber Cup ===
==== Group ====
Team	Pts	Pld	W	L	MF	MA	MD
Canada	3	3	3	0	12	3	+9
United States	2	3	2	1	11	4	+7
Peru	1	3	1	2	7	8	−1
Brazil	0	3	0	3	0	15	−15

February 16, 2008
United States	4–1	Peru
Canada	5–0	Brazil
Canada	4–1	Peru
United States	5–0	Brazil
February 17, 2008
United States	2–3	Canada
Peru	5–0	Brazil

==== Classification ====
February 18, 2008
Peru	3–1	Brazil	Third place
Canada	1–3	United States	Final
