= Uganda International =

Badminton tournament in Uganda

The Uganda International is an international badminton tournament held in Uganda organised by Uganda Badminton Association. In 2008, this tournament have been sanctioned by Badminton World Federation as International Series rated event with total prize money US$5000. For the badminton players, this tournament become a landmark for Uganda, because they can improved their point in world ranking and also in certain years, the points will be the Olympic Games qualification. Another tournament, Kampala International is a Future Series level since 2023.

== Previous winners ==
=== Uganda International Challenge ===
Year	Men's singles	Women's singles	Men's doubles	Women's doubles	Mixed doubles	Ref
1995	(Uganda) Christopher Musaazi	(Uganda) Helen Luziika	(Uganda) Naveen (Uganda) Frank Nsubuga	(Uganda) Helen Luziika (Uganda) Annet Nakamya	(Uganda) Naveen (Uganda) Annet Nakamya	
1996– 2007	No competition					
2008	(Lithuania) Kestutis Navickas	(Italy) Agnese Allegrini	(Sri Lanka) Niluka Karunaratne (Sri Lanka) Dinuka Karunaratne	No competition		
2009	(Iran) Ali Shahosseini	(Mauritius) Karen Foo Kune	(Uganda) Shaban Nkutu (Iran) Ali Shahosseini	(Uganda) Shamim Bangi (Uganda) Margaret Nankabirwa	(Uganda) Abraham Wogute (Uganda) Rita Namusisi	
2010	(Nigeria) Jinkan Ifraimu	(Spain) Carolina Marín	(South Africa) Dorian James (South Africa) Wiaan Viljoen	(South Africa) Michelle Edwards (South Africa) Annari Viljoen	(South Africa) Dorian James (South Africa) Michelle Edwards	
2011	(Czech Republic) Jan Fröhlich	(Portugal) Telma Santos	(Italy) Giovanni Greco (Italy) Daniel Messersi	(Turkey) Özge Bayrak (Turkey) Öznur Caliskan	(Uganda) Ivan Mayega (Uganda) Norah Nassimbwa	
2012	(Sri Lanka) Niluka Karunaratne	(Switzerland) Jeanine Cicognini	(South Africa) Dorian Lance James (South Africa) Willem Viljoen	(South Africa) Michelle Claire Edwards (South Africa) Annari Viljoen	(South Africa) Willem Viljoen (South Africa) Annari Viljoen	
2013	(Sri Lanka) Dinuka Karunaratne	(India) Saili Rane	(Italy) Giovanni Greco (Italy) Daniel Messersi	(Mauritius) Shama Aboobakar (Nigeria) Grace Gabriel	(Egypt) Mahmoud El Sayad (Egypt) Nadine Ashraf	
2014	(Sri Lanka) Dinuka Karunaratne	(India) Trupti Murgunde	(Malaysia) Chun Quan Chong (Malaysia) Yeoh Seng Zoe	(Nigeria) Tosin Damilola Atolagbe (Nigeria) Fatima Azeez	(Nigeria) Ola Fagbemi (Nigeria) Dorcas Adesokan	
2015	(South Africa) Jacob Maliekal	(Turkey) Ebru Yazgan	(Czech Republic) Pavel Florián (Czech Republic) Ondřej Kopřiva	(India) N. Sikki Reddy (India) Poorvisha S. Ram	(India) Tarun Kona (India) N. Sikki Reddy	
2016	(Sri Lanka) Niluka Karunaratne	(Portugal) Telma Santos	(Sri Lanka) Dinuka Karunaratne (Sri Lanka) Niluka Karunaratne	(Turkey) Cemre Fere (Turkey) Ebru Yazgan	(Egypt) Abdelrahman Kashkal (Egypt) Hadia Hosny	
2017	(Mauritius) Julien Paul	(Uganda) Shamim Bangi	(India) Alwin Francis (India) Tarun Kona	(Egypt) Doha Hany (Egypt) Hadia Hosny	(Jordan) Bahaedeen Alshannik (Jordan) Domou Amro	
2018	(France) Pierrick Cajot	(Mauritius) Kate Foo Kune	(Kazakhstan) Artur Niyazov (Kazakhstan) Dmitriy Panarin	(Egypt) Doha Hany (Egypt) Hadia Hosny	(Germany) Jonathan Persson (Mauritius) Kate Foo Kune	
2019	(India) B. M. Rahul Bharadwaj	(Myanmar) Thet Htar Thuzar	(Nigeria) Godwin Olofua (Nigeria) Anuoluwapo Opeyori	(Egypt) Doha Hany (Egypt) Hadia Hosny	(United States) Howard Shu (United States) Paula Lynn Obañana	
2020	(Hungary) Gergely Krausz	(Myanmar) Thet Htar Thuzar	(India) Tarun Kona (India) Shivam Sharma	(India) Meghana Jakkampudi (India) Poorvisha S. Ram	(India) Tarun Kona (India) Meghana Jakkampudi	
2021	(India) Varun Kapur	(India) Malvika Bansod	No competition	(Uganda) Husina Kobugabe (Uganda) Mable Namakoye	(Uganda) Brian Kasirye (Uganda) Husina Kobugabe	
2022	(France) Arnaud Merklé	(Canada) Talia Ng	(Malaysia) Boon Xin Yuan (Malaysia) Wong Tien Ci	(Malaysia) Kasturi Radhakrishnan (Malaysia) Venosha Radhakrishnan	(Algeria) Koceila Mammeri (Algeria) Tanina Mammeri	
2023	(Malaysia) Justin Hoh	(Malaysia) Letshanaa Karupathevan	(Thailand) Pongsakorn Thongkham (Thailand) Wongsatorn Thongkham	(India) Trisha Hegde (India) Khushi Thakkar	(Singapore) Andy Kwek (Singapore) Crystal Wong	
2024	(Vietnam) Lê Đức Phát	(India) Aakarshi Kashyap	(India) Arjun M. R. (India) Dhruv Kapila	(United States) Paula Lynn Cao Hok (United States) Lauren Lam	(India) Sathish Karunakaran (India) Aadya Variyath	
2025	(India) Manraj Singh	(United States) Ishika Jaiswal	(India) Mohammad Amaan (India) Dingku Konthoujam	(United States) Lauren Lam (United States) Allison Lee	(India) Ishaan Bhatnagar (India) Srinidhi Narayanan	
2026	(Australia) Karono	(India) Anupama Upadhyaya	(India) Bhargav Arigela (India) Viswatej Gobburu	(United States) Lauren Lam (United States) Allison Lee	(India) Ishaan Bhatnagar (India) Shruti Mishra	

=== Uganda International Series ===
Year	Men's singles	Women's singles	Men's doubles	Women's doubles	Mixed doubles	Ref
2023	(Mexico) Luis Ramón Garrido	(India) Meghana Reddy	(Uganda) Brian Kasirye (Uganda) Muzafaru Lubega	(India) Rutaparna Panda (India) Swetaparna Panda	(Algeria) Koceila Mammeri (Algeria) Tanina Mammeri	
2024	(India) Rahul Bharadwaj	(Malaysia) Loh Zhi Wei	(India) Nithin H. V. (India) Harsha Veeramreddy	(India) Gayatri Rawat (India) Mansa Rawat	(Malaysia) Ashraf Zakaria (Malaysia) Lim Xuan	
2025	(Myanmar) Hein Htut	(India) Rujula Ramu	(Malaysia) Ashraf Zakaria (Malaysia) Ariffin Zakaria	(Switzerland) Jenjira Stadelmann (Switzerland) Leila Zarrouk	(Malaysia) Chong Zi Xiang (Malaysia) Joanne Ng	
2026	(Myanmar) Hein Htut	(India) Aesha Gandhi	(Malaysia) Hafiz Hakimi Hashim (Malaysia) Wong Meng Fong	(India) Akshita Manral (India) Ishita Negi	(Malaysia) Hafiz Hakimi Hashim (Malaysia) Lim Xuan	

=== Kampala International ===
Year	Men's singles	Women's singles	Men's doubles	Women's doubles	Mixed doubles	Ref
2023	(Uganda) Brian Kasirye	(France) Romane Cloteaux-Foucault	(Uganda) Brian Kasirye (Uganda) Muzafaru Lubega	(India) Rutaparna Panda (India) Swetaparna Panda	(United Arab Emirates) Kuswanto (United Arab Emirates) Sreeyuktha Sreejith Parol	
2024	(India) Manraj Singh	(India) Shreya Lele	(Malaysia) Ashraf Zakaria (Malaysia) Ariffin Zakaria	(India) Gayatri Rawat (India) Mansa Rawat	(Malaysia) Ashraf Zakaria (Malaysia) Lim Xuan	
2025	(India) Harsheel Dani	(India) Rujula Ramu	(Malaysia) Ashraf Zakaria (Malaysia) Ariffin Zakaria	(Switzerland) Jenjira Stadelmann (Switzerland) Leila Zarrouk	(Malaysia) Ashraf Zakaria (Malaysia) Lim Xuan	
2026	(India) Abhishek Kanapala	(India) Ishita Negi	(India) Abhyuday Choudhary (India) Ayush Makhija	(India) Sonali Singh (India) Ritika Thaker	(Malaysia) Hafiz Hakimi Hashim (Malaysia) Lim Xuan	

== Performances by nation ==
=== Uganda International Challenge ===
As of the 2026 edition

Pos	Nation	MS	WS	MD	WD	XD	Total
1	India	3	5	5	3	5	21
2	Uganda*	1	2	0.5	2	3	8.5
3	South Africa	1		2	2	2	7
4	Sri Lanka	4		2			6
5	Egypt				3	2	5
5	Malaysia	1	1	2	1		5
5	United States		1		3	1	5
8	Nigeria	1		1	1.5	1	4.5
9	Mauritius	1	2		0.5	0.5	4
10	Italy		1	2			3
10	Turkey		1		2		3
12	Czech Republic	1		1			2
12	France	2					2
12	Myanmar		2				2
12	Portugal		2				2
16	Iran	1		0.5			1.5
17	Algeria					1	1
17	Australia	1					1
17	Canada		1				1
17	Hungary	1					1
17	Jordan					1	1
17	Kazakhstan			1			1
17	Lithuania	1					1
17	Singapore					1	1
17	Spain		1				1
17	Switzerland		1				1
17	Thailand			1			1
17	Vietnam	1					1
29	Germany					0.5	0.5
	Total	20	20	18	18	18	94

* Host nation

=== Uganda International Series ===
As of the 2026 edition

Pos	Nation	MS	WS	MD	WD	XD	Total
1	India	1	3	1	3		8
2	Malaysia		1	2		3	6
3	Myanmar	2					2
4	Algeria					1	1
4	Mexico	1					1
4	Switzerland				1		1
4	Uganda*			1			1
	Total	4	4	4	4	4	20

=== Kampala International ===
As of the 2026 edition

Pos	Nation	MS	WS	MD	WD	XD	Total
1	India	3	3	1	3		10
2	Malaysia			2		3	5
3	Uganda*	1		1			2
4	France		1				1
4	Switzerland				1		1
4	United Arab Emirates					1	1
	Total	4	4	4	4	4	20
