= South Africa International =

Badminton tournament

The South Africa International is an international badminton tournament held in South Africa organised by Badminton South Africa, sanctioned by Badminton World Federation (BWF) and Badminton Confederation of Africa (BCA). Since 2018, this tournament has been a BWF Future Series.

== Previous winners ==
Year	Men's singles	Women's singles	Men's doubles	Women's doubles	Mixed doubles	Ref
1996	(South Africa) Johan Kleingeld	(South Africa) Michelle Claire Edwards	(South Africa) Johan Kleingeld (South Africa) Gavin Polmans	(South Africa) Vanessa van der Walt (South Africa) Annalize van Staden	(South Africa) Johan Kleingeld (South Africa) Michelle Claire Edwards	
1997	(South Africa) Johan Kleingeld	(South Africa) Michelle Claire Edwards	(South Africa) Anton Kriel (South Africa) Nico Meerholz	(South Africa) Lina Fourie (South Africa) Tracey Thompson	(South Africa) Johan Kleingeld (South Africa) Lina Fourie	
1998	(Denmark) Jonas Rasmussen	(South Africa) Lina Fourie	(Denmark) Kenneth Jonassen (Denmark) Jonas Rasmussen	(South Africa) Meagen Burnett (South Africa) Michelle Claire Edwards	(Denmark) Jonas Rasmussen (South Africa) Meagen Burnett	
1999	(South Africa) Johan Kleingeld	(South Africa) Meagen Burnett	(South Africa) Johan Kleingeld (South Africa) Anton Kriel	(South Africa) Chantal Botts (South Africa) Linda Montignies	(South Africa) Johan Kleingeld (South Africa) Karen Coetzer	
2000	(South Africa) Dean Potgieter	(South Africa) Michelle Claire Edwards	(South Africa) Anton Kriel (South Africa) Nico Meerholz	No competition	(South Africa) Anton Kriel (South Africa) Michelle Claire Edwards	
2001	(Mauritius) Denis Constantin	(South Africa) Michelle Claire Edwards	(Mauritius) Stephan Beeharry (Mauritius) Denis Constantin	(South Africa) Chantal Botts (South Africa) Michelle Claire Edwards	(South Africa) Johan Kleingeld (South Africa) Karen Coetzer	
2002	(Wales) Richard Vaughan	(South Africa) Michelle Claire Edwards	(South Africa) Chris Dednam (South Africa) Johan Kleingeld	(South Africa) Chantal Botts (South Africa) Michelle Claire Edwards	(South Africa) Chris Dednam (South Africa) Antoinette Uys	
2003	(Japan) Shoji Sato	(France) Pi Hongyan	(Germany) Kristof Hopp (Germany) Thomas Tesche	(Japan) Chikako Nakayama (Japan) Keiko Yoshitomi	(Australia) Travis Denney (Australia) Kate Wilson-Smith	
2004	No competition					
2005	(India) Nikhil Kanetkar	(Nigeria) Grace Daniel	(South Africa) Chris Dednam (South Africa) Roelof Dednam	(South Africa) Chantal Botts (South Africa) Michelle Claire Edwards	(South Africa) Dorian James (South Africa) Michelle Claire Edwards	
2006	(Wales) Richard Vaughan	(India) Trupti Murgunde	(South Africa) Dorian James (South Africa) Willem Viljoen	(South Africa) Chantal Botts (South Africa) Michelle Claire Edwards	(South Africa) Dorian James (South Africa) Michelle Claire Edwards	
2007	(Iran) Kaveh Mehrabi	(Spain) Lucía Tavera	(South Africa) Dorian James (South Africa) Willem Viljoen	(South Africa) Jade Morgan (South Africa) Annari Viljoen	(South Africa) Chris Dednam (South Africa) Annari Viljoen	
2008	(Brazil) Daniel Paiola	(South Africa) Stacey Doubell	(South Africa) Dorian James (South Africa) Willem Viljoen	(South Africa) Jade Morgan (South Africa) Annari Viljoen	(South Africa) Chris Dednam (South Africa) Michelle Claire Edwards	
2009	(Iran) Ali Shahhosseini	(South Africa) Michelle Claire Edwards	(South Africa) Dorian James (South Africa) Willem Viljoen	(South Africa) Michelle Claire Edwards (South Africa) Annari Viljoen	(South Africa) Dorian James (South Africa) Michelle Claire Edwards	
2010	(Iran) Kaveh Mehrabi	(Italy) Agnese Allegrini	(South Africa) Chris Dednam (South Africa) Roelof Dednam	(Turkey) Özge Bayrak (Turkey) Öznur Çalışkan	(South Africa) Chris Dednam (South Africa) Annari Viljoen	
2011	(Portugal) Pedro Martins	(Turkey) Özge Bayrak	(South Africa) Dorian James (South Africa) Willem Viljoen	(Turkey) Özge Bayrak (Turkey) Neslihan Yiğit	(South Africa) Chris Dednam (South Africa) Annari Viljoen	
2012	(Scotland) Alistair Casey	(South Africa) Stacey Doubell	(South Africa) Andries Malan (South Africa) Willem Viljoen	(South Africa) Michelle Claire Edwards (South Africa) Annari Viljoen	(South Africa) Willem Viljoen (South Africa) Annari Viljoen	
2013	(South Africa) Jacob Maliekal	(Portugal) Telma Santos	(Mauritius) Aatish Lubah (Mauritius) Julien Paul	(South Africa) Elme de Villiers (Serbia) Sandra Halilović	(Egypt) Abdelrahman Kashkal (Egypt) Hadia Hosny	
2014	(Austria) Luka Wraber	(Turkey) Cemre Fere	(Iran) Farzin Khanjani (Iran) Mohamad Reza Khanjani	(Turkey) Cemre Fere (Turkey) Ebru Tunalı	(South Africa) Cameron Coetzer (South Africa) Michelle Butler-Emmett	
2015	(United States) Howard Shu	(Portugal) Telma Santos	(Iran) Soroush Eskandari (Iran) Farzin Khanjani	(Turkey) Cemre Fere (Turkey) Ebru Yazgan	(South Africa) Andries Malan (South Africa) Jennifer Fry	
2016	(South Africa) Jacob Maliekal	(Russia) Evgeniya Kosetskaya	(Egypt) Abdelrahman Abdelhakim (Egypt) Ahmed Salah	(South Africa) Michelle Butler-Emmett (South Africa) Jennifer Fry	(Russia) Anatoliy Yartsev (Russia) Evgeniya Kosetskaya	
2017	(Belgium) Maxime Moreels	(India) Vaishnavi Reddy Jakka	(India) Tarun Kona (India) Saurabh Sharma	(South Africa) Michelle Butler-Emmett (South Africa) Jennifer Fry	(South Africa) Andries Malan (South Africa) Jennifer Fry	
2018	(Azerbaijan) Azmy Qowimuramadhoni	(Nigeria) Dorcas Ajoke Adesokan	(Azerbaijan) Ade Resky Dwicahyo (Azerbaijan) Azmy Qowimuramadhoni	(South Africa) Lehandre Schoeman (South Africa) Johanita Scholtz	(South Africa) Andries Malan (South Africa) Jennifer Fry	
2019	(Austria) Luka Wraber	(Mauritius) Kate Foo Kune	(Algeria) Koceila Mammeri (Algeria) Youcef Sabri Medel	(Italy) Katharina Fink (Italy) Yasmine Hamza	(Egypt) Adham Hatem Elgamal (Egypt) Doha Hany	
2020	Cancelled (Note: This tournament, originally to be played from 3 to 6 December, was later cancelled due to the COVID-19 pandemic in South Africa.)					
2021	(India) Farogh Sanjay Aman	(South Africa) Johanita Scholtz	(South Africa) Jarred Elliott (South Africa) Robert Summers	(South Africa) Amy Ackerman (South Africa) Johanita Scholtz	(South Africa) Robert White (South Africa) Deidre Laurens	
2022	(Chinese Taipei) Hung Chun-chung	(Chinese Taipei) Lee Yu-hsuan	(Chinese Taipei) Lee Wen-che (Chinese Taipei) Liu Yu-che	(Chinese Taipei) Cheng Husan-ying (Chinese Taipei) Tsai Li-yu	(Chinese Taipei) Cheng Yu-yen (Chinese Taipei) Lee Yu-hua	
2023	(England) Nadeem Dalvi	(Mauritius) Kate Ludik	(South Africa) Caden Kakora (South Africa) Robert White	(South Africa) Amy Ackerman (South Africa) Deidre Laurens	(South Africa) Robert White (South Africa) Deidre Laurens	
2024	(England) Ben Hammond	(South Africa) Johanita Scholtz	(Malta) Matthew Abela (Israel) Maxim Grinblat	(South Africa) Amy Ackerman (South Africa) Deidre Laurens	(South Africa) Caden Kakora (South Africa) Johanita Scholtz	
2025	(Vietnam) Phan Phúc Thịnh	(Chinese Taipei) Lee Yu-hsuan	(Australia) Avinash Srinivas (Australia) Ephraim Stephen Sam	(South Africa) Amy Ackerman (South Africa) Johanita Scholtz	(Saudi Arabia) Amer Mohammed (Saudi Arabia) Nabiha Shariff	
2026						

== Performances by nation ==
As of the 2025 edition

Pos	Nation	MS	WS	MD	WD	XD	Total
1	South Africa	6	12	15	19.5	21.5	74
2	Turkey	0	2	0	4	0	6
2	Chinese Taipei	1	2	1	1	1	6
4	India	2	2	1	0	0	5
4	Iran	3	0	2	4	0	5
4	Mauritius	1	2	2	0	0	5
7	Egypt	0	0	1	0	2	3
7	Portugal	1	2	0	0	0	3
9	Denmark	1	0	1	0	0.5	2.5
10	Australia	0	0	1	0	1	2
10	Austria	2	0	0	0	0	2
10	Azerbaijan	1	0	1	0	0	2
10	England	2	0	0	0	0	2
10	Italy	0	1	0	1	0	2
10	Japan	1	0	0	1	0	2
10	Nigeria	0	2	0	0	0	2
10	Russia	0	1	0	0	1	2
10	Wales	2	0	0	0	0	2
19	Algeria	0	0	1	0	0	1
19	Belgium	1	0	0	0	0	1
19	Brazil	1	0	0	0	0	1
19	France	0	1	0	0	0	1
19	Germany	0	0	1	0	0	1
19	Saudi Arabia	0	0	0	0	1	1
19	Scotland	0	1	0	0	0	1
19	Spain	0	1	0	0	0	1
19	United States	1	0	0	0	0	1
19	Vietnam	1	0	0	0	0	1
29	Israel	0	0	0.5	0	0	0.5
29	Malta	0	0	0.5	0	0	0.5
29	Serbia	0	0	0	0.5	0	0.5
Total		28	28	28	27	28	139
