= Mauritius International =

The Mauritius International is an annual international badminton tournament held in Mauritius, organized by the Mauritius Badminton Association (MBA) and sanctioned by the BWF. In recent years, the tournament has primarily been classified as an International Series event, although it was classified as a Future Series event in 2012 and 2013. Another tournament, Rose-Hill International, established in 2016, was categorized as a Future Series event.

== Previous winners ==
Year	Men's singles	Women's singles	Men's doubles	Women's doubles	Mixed doubles
1966	(Mauritius) B. L. Hall	(Mauritius) Muirhead	(Mauritius) B. L. Hall (Mauritius) R. Chevreau de Montlehu	(Mauritius) P. Foster (Mauritius) Muirhead	(Mauritius) P. Chevreau de Montlehu (Mauritius) G. de Chazal
1967	(Mauritius) B. L. Hall	(Mauritius) J. Shaw	(Mauritius) B. L. Hall (Mauritius) P. Stannard	(Mauritius) P. Foster (Mauritius) J. Shaw	(Mauritius) P. Chevreau de Montlehu (Mauritius) G. de Chazal
1968	(Mauritius) Yvan Lagesse	(Mauritius) P. Mathieu	(Mauritius) J. Lising (Mauritius) J. Pin Harry	(Mauritius) G. de Chazal (Mauritius) J. Pearson	(Mauritius) J. Pin Harry (Mauritius) J. Pearson
1969	(Mauritius) J. Pin Harry	(Mauritius) H. Pin Harry	(Mauritius) H. Dulloo (Mauritius) H. Nagesh	(Mauritius) A. M. Bouchet (Mauritius) M. C. Juhel	(Mauritius) J. Pin Harry (Mauritius) D. Wan
1970	(Mauritius) J. Pin Harry	(Mauritius) S. Sheo Chap Sing	(Mauritius) G. de Chazal (Mauritius) H. de Chazal	(Mauritius) J. Mathieu (Mauritius) V. Marot	(Mauritius) P. Chevreau de Montlehu (Mauritius) J. Mathieu
1971– 1990	No competition				
1991	(Nigeria) Tamuno Gibson	(Mauritius) Martine de Souza	(Nigeria) Tamuno Gibson (Nigeria) Agarawu Tunde	(Mauritius) Martine de Souza (Mauritius) Vandanah Seesurun	(Nigeria) Tamuno Gibson (Nigeria) Obiageli Olorunsola
1992– 1993	No competition				
1994	(England) Peter Bush	(France) Sandra Dimbour	(England) Michael Adams (England) Dave Wright	(England) Joanne Davies (England) Tanya Woodward	(England) Michael Adams (England) Joanne Davies
1995	(England) Steve Isaac	(England) Justine Willmott	(Malaysia) Pang Cheh Chang (Malaysia) Pei Wei Chung	(South Africa) Michelle Edwards (South Africa) Meagen Burnett	(England) Steve Isaac (England) Karen Chapman
1996	(Malaysia) Jason Wong	(England) Justine Willmott	(England) Nitin Panesar (England) Dave Wright	(England) Lorraine Cole (England) Justine Willmott	(England) Dave Wright (England) Lorraine Cole
1997	(Malaysia) Yap Yong Jyen	(South Africa) Michelle Edwards	(England) Peter Jeffrey (England) Graham Hurrell	(Scotland) Kirsteen McEwan (England) Wendy Taylor	(England) Peter Jeffrey (Scotland) Kirsteen McEwan
1998– 2000	No competition				
2001	(France) Sydney Lengagne	(South Africa) Michelle Edwards	(Mauritius) Geenesh Dussain (Mauritius) Yogeshsingh Mahadnac	No competition	(Mauritius) Stephan Beeharry (Mauritius) Shama Aboobakar
2002	(Germany) Conrad Hückstädt	(South Africa) Michelle Edwards	(Wales) Matthew Hughes (Wales) Martyn Lewis	(Wales) Felicity Gallup (Wales) Joanne Muggeridge	(Wales) Matthew Hughes (Wales) Joanne Muggeridge
2003	(Japan) Keita Masuda	(France) Pi Hongyan	(Japan) Shuichi Nakao (Japan) Shuichi Sakamoto	(Germany) Nicole Grether (Germany) Juliane Schenk	(Japan) Shizuka Yamamoto (Japan) Tadashi Ohtsuka
2004	(India) Abhinn Shyam Gupta	(Hong Kong) Ling Wan Ting	(Japan) Keita Masuda (Japan) Tadashi Ohtsuka	(Singapore) Li Yujia (Singapore) Jiang Yanmei	(Singapore) Kendrick Lee Yen Hui (Singapore) Li Yujia
2005	No competition				
2006	(Wales) Richard Vaughan	(Italy) Agnese Allegrini	(South Africa) Dorian James (South Africa) Willem Viljoen	(Mauritius) Karen Foo Kune (Nigeria) Grace Daniel	(Nigeria) Greg Okuonghae (Nigeria) Grace Daniel
2007	(Japan) Sho Sasaki	(Italy) Agnese Allegrini	(Germany) Jochen Cassel (Germany) Thomas Tesche	(Portugal) Ana Moura (Slovenia) Maja Tvrdy	(South Africa) Chris Dednam (South Africa) Michelle Edwards
2008	(Uganda) Edwin Ekiring	(Nigeria) Grace Daniel	(Nigeria) Jinkan Ifraimu (Nigeria) Ola Fagbemi	(South Africa) Chantal Botts (South Africa) Michelle Edwards	(South Africa) Dorian James (South Africa) Michelle Edwards
2009	(Czech Republic) Jan Fröhlich	(Nigeria) Grace Daniel	(South Africa) Dorian James (South Africa) Willem Viljoen	(Nigeria) Susan Ideh (Seychelles) Juliette Ah-Wan	(Nigeria) Ola Fagbemi (Nigeria) Grace Daniel
2010	(India) Oscar Bansal	(France) Elisa Chanteur	(Mauritius) Sahir Edoo (Mauritius) Yoni Louison	(Australia) Leisha Cooper (Mauritius) Yeldi Louison	(Indonesia) Yoga Ukikasah (Mauritius) Karen Foo Kune
2011	(India) Chetan Anand	(Canada) Nicole Grether	(India) Manu Attri (India) Jishnu Sanyal	(Canada) Nicole Grether (Canada) Charmaine Reid	(South Africa) Dorian James (South Africa) Michelle Edwards
2012	(Malaysia) Kuan Beng Hong	(Mauritius) Shama Aboobakar	(Malaysia) Gan Teik Chai (Malaysia) Ong Soon Hock	(Seychelles) Alisen Camille (Seychelles) Cynthia Course	(Seychelles) Georgie Cupidon (Seychelles) Cynthia Course
2013	(India) P. Vinay Kumar Reddy	(Mauritius) Kate Foo Kune	(South Africa) Andries Malan (South Africa) Willem Viljoen	(South Africa) Elme de Villiers (South Africa) Sandra Le Grange	(South Africa) Willem Viljoen (South Africa) Michelle Butler-Emmett
2014	(Austria) Luka Wraber	(Italy) Jeanine Cicognini	(Germany) Raphael Beck (Germany) Andreas Heinz	(Germany) Annika Horbach (New Zealand) Maria Mata Masinipeni	(Germany) Andreas Heinz (Germany) Annika Horbach
2015	(Guatemala) Kevin Cordón	(Finland) Nanna Vainio	(India) Shlok Ramchandran (India) Sanyam Shukla	(Iran) Negin Amiripour (Iran) Aghaei Hajiagha Soraya	(South Africa) Andries Malan (South Africa) Jennifer Fry
2016	(India) Rahul Yadav Chittaboina	(India) Saili Rane	(India) Satwiksairaj Rankireddy (India) Chirag Shetty	(Malaysia) Lee Zhi Qing (India) Prajakta Sawant	(India) Satwiksairaj Rankireddy (India) K. Maneesha
2017	(Malaysia) Goh Giap Chin	(India) Shikha Gautam	(Italy) Fabio Caponio (Italy) Giovanni Toti	(Germany) Lisa Kaminski (Germany) Hannah Pohl	(Malaysia) Yogendran Khrishnan (India) Prajakta Sawant
2018	(Malaysia) Goh Giap Chin	(Malaysia) Letshanaa Karupathevan	(Austria) Daniel Graßmück (Austria) Roman Zirnwald	(India) Simran Singhi (India) Ritika Thaker	(Mauritius) Julien Paul (Mauritius) Aurélie Allet
2019	(Malaysia) Goh Giap Chin	(Myanmar) Thet Htar Thuzar	(Malaysia) Boon Xin Yuan (Malaysia) Yap Qar Siong	(Malaysia) Kasturi Radhakrishnan (Malaysia) Venosha Radhakrishnan	(United States) Vinson Chiu (United States) Breanna Chi
2020– 2022	No competition				
2023	(India) Kartikey Gulshan Kumar	(Japan) Hina Akechi	(Japan) Shogo Ogawa (Japan) Daisuke Sano	(Japan) Natsumi Takasaki (Japan) Mai Tanabe	(India) Hariharan Amsakarunan (India) Varshini Viswanath Sri
2024	(Japan) Yudai Okimoto	(Japan) Nanaho Kondo	(France) Julien Maio (France) William Villeger	(Japan) Kaho Osawa (Japan) Mai Tanabe	(France) Julien Maio (France) Léa Palermo
2025	Cancelled				
2026	Cancelled				

== Performances by nation ==
As of the 2024 edition

Top Nations
Pos	Nation	MS	WS	MD	WD	XD	Total
1	Mauritius*	5	8	7	7	7.5	34.5
2	India	6	2	3	1.5	2.5	15
3	South Africa		3	3	3	5	14
4	England	2	2	3	2.5	3.5	13
5	Malaysia	6	1	3	1.5	0.5	12
6	Japan	3	2	3	2	1	11
7	Nigeria	1	2	2	1	3	9
8	Germany	1		2	2.5	1	6.5
9	France	1	3	1		1	6
10	Italy		3	1			4
10	Wales	1		1	1	1	4
12	Seychelles				1.5	1	2.5
13	Austria	1		1			2
13	Canada		1		1		2
13	Singapore				1	1	2
16	Czech Republic	1					1
16	Finland		1				1
16	Guatemala	1					1
16	Hong Kong		1				1
16	Iran				1		1
16	Myanmar		1				1
16	Scotland				0.5	0.5	1
16	Uganda	1					1
16	United States					1	1
25	Australia				0.5		0.5
25	Indonesia					0.5	0.5
25	New Zealand				0.5		0.5
25	Portugal				0.5		0.5
25	Slovenia				0.5		0.5
Total		30	30	30	29	30	149

* Host nation
