= Mary Gideon =

Nigerian badminton player

Mary Gideon (born 10 December 1989) is a Nigerian badminton player.

== Career ==
Mary Gideon won the 2009 African Women's Doubles Championship with Grace Daniel. Both were also successful together at the Mauritius International of the same year and took part in the 2009 Badminton World Championship.

== Sporting achievements ==
Season	Event	Category	Position	Name
2009	Mauritius International	Women's doubles	1	Grace Daniel / Mary Gideon
2009	African championships	Women's doubles	1	Grace Daniel / Mary Gideon
