= Victor Makanju =

Nigerian badminton player (born 1985)

Personal information
- Born: Victor Gbolahan Makanju; 22 March 1985 (age 41)

Sport
- Country: Nigeria
- Sport: Badminton

Men's singles & doubles
- Highest ranking: 213 (MS 12 June 2014); 119 (MD 27 March 2014); 485 (XD 30 October 2014)
- BWF profile
Medal record
Men's badminton
Representing Nigeria
African Games
Gold medal – first place	2011 Maputo	Mixed team
Bronze medal – third place	2015 Brazzaville	Men's doubles
Bronze medal – third place	2015 Brazzaville	Mixed team
African Championships
Silver medal – second place	2014 Gaborone	Men's doubles
Silver medal – second place	2014 Gaborone	Mixed team
Silver medal – second place	2013 Rose Hill	Men's doubles
Silver medal – second place	2013 Rose Hill	Mixed team
Silver medal – second place	2011 Marrakesh	Mixed team
Bronze medal – third place	2014 Gaborone	Men's singles
Bronze medal – third place	2012 Addis Ababa	Men's doubles
Bronze medal – third place	2011 Marrakesh	Men's doubles
Africa Team Championships
Silver medal – second place	2012 Addis Ababa	Men's team

Victor Gbolahan Makanju (born 22 March 1985) is a Nigerian badminton player.

== Achievements ==
=== All African Games ===
Men's doubles
Year	Venue	Partner	Opponent	Score	Result
2015	Gymnase Étienne Mongha; Brazzaville, Republic of the Congo	(Nigeria) Enejoh Abah	(Egypt) Ali Ahmed El Khateeb (Egypt) Abdelrahman Kashkal	8–21, 15–21	Bronze

=== African Championships ===
Men's singles
Year	Venue	Opponent	Score	Result
2014	Lobatse Stadium, Gaborone, Botswana	(South Africa) Jacob Maliekal	11–21, 11–21	Bronze

Men's doubles
Year	Venue	Partner	Opponent	Score	Result
2014	Lobatse Stadium, Gaborone, Botswana	(Nigeria) Enejoh Abah	(South Africa) Andries Malan (South Africa) Willem Viljoen	8–21, 15–21	Silver
2013	National Badminton Centre, Rose Hill, Mauritius	(Nigeria) Enejoh Abah	(South Africa) Andries Malan (South Africa) Willem Viljoen	11–21, 12–21	Silver
2012	Arat Kilo Hall, Addis Ababa, Ethiopia	(Nigeria) Enejoh Abah	(South Africa) Dorian James (South Africa) Willem Viljoen	13–21, 9–21	Bronze
2011	Marrakesh, Morocco	(Nigeria) Enejoh Abah	(South Africa) Willem Viljoen (South Africa) Dorian James	15–21, 9–21	Bronze

=== BWF International Challenge/Series ===
Men's doubles
Year	Tournament	Partner	Opponent	Score	Result
2014	Nigeria International	(Nigeria) Enejoh Abah	(Nigeria) Jinkan Ifraimu Bulus (Nigeria) Ola Fagbemi	11–10, 5–11, 8–11, 9–11	(silver) Runner-up
2013	Nigeria International	(Nigeria) Enejoh Abah	(Nigeria) Jinkan Ifraimu Bulus (Nigeria) Ola Fagbemi	20–22, 19–21	(silver) Runner-up
2013	Kenya International	(Nigeria) Enejoh Abah	(Nigeria) Adamu J (India) Siddhrath Saboo	21–17, 21–15	(gold) Winner

BWF International Challenge tournament
BWF International Series tournament
BWF Future Series tournament
