= Fatima Azeez =

Nigerian badminton player (born 1992)

Personal information
- Born: Titilayo Fatima Azeez; 31 December 1992 (age 33)

Sport
- Country: Nigeria
- Sport: Badminton

Women's singles & doubles
- Highest ranking: 189 (WS 7 August 2014); 94 (WD 19 June 2014); 536 (XD 12 May 2016)
- BWF profile
Medal record
Women's badminton
Representing Nigeria
All-Africa Games
| Gold medal – first place | 2011 Maputo | Mixed team |
| Bronze medal – third place | 2011 Maputo | Women's doubles |
African Championships
| Silver medal – second place | 2014 Gaborone | Mixed team |
| Silver medal – second place | 2013 Rose Hill | Mixed team |
| Silver medal – second place | 2012 Addis Ababa | Women's singles |
| Silver medal – second place | 2011 Marrakesh | Mixed team |
| Bronze medal – third place | 2014 Gaborone | Women's doubles |
Africa Team Championships
| Silver medal – second place | 2012 Addis Ababa | Women's team |

Titilayo Fatima Azeez (born 31 December 1992) is a Nigerian badminton player. In 2010, she competed at the Summer Youth Olympics in Singapore. In 2011, she won the women's doubles bronze medal at the All-Africa Games in Maputo, Mozambique.

== Achievements ==
=== All-Africa Games ===
Women's doubles
| Year | Venue | Partner | Opponent | Score | Result |
|---|---|---|---|---|---|
| 2011 | Escola Josina Machel; Maputo, Mozambique | (Nigeria) Grace Daniel | (Seychelles) Camille Allisen (Seychelles) Cynthia Course | 22–24, 15–21 | Bronze |

=== African Championships ===
Women's singles
| Year | Venue | Opponent | Score | Result |
|---|---|---|---|---|
| 2012 | Arat Kilo Hall; Addis Ababa, Ethiopia | (Nigeria) Grace Gabriel Ofodile | 19–21, 21–14, 16–21 | Silver |

Women's doubles
| Year | Venue | Partner | Opponent | Score | Result |
|---|---|---|---|---|---|
| 2014 | Lobatse Stadium; Gaborone, Botswana | (Nigeria) Tosin Damilola Atolagbe | (Mauritius) Kate Foo Kune (Mauritius) Yeldy Louison | 16–21, 23–21, 17–21 | Bronze |

=== BWF International Challenge/Series ===
Women's singles
| Year | Tournament | Opponent | Score | Result |
|---|---|---|---|---|
| 2013 | Nigeria International | (Nigeria) Tosin Damilola Atolagbe | 21–16, 15–21, 22–20 | (gold) Winner |

Women's doubles
| Year | Tournament | Partner | Opponent | Score | Result |
|---|---|---|---|---|---|
| 2014 | Nigeria International | (Nigeria) Tosin Atolagbe | (Uganda) Shamim Bangi (Egypt) Hadia Hosny | 5–11, 10–11, 10–11 | (silver) Runner-up |
| 2014 | Lagos International | (Nigeria) Tosin Atolagbe | (Nigeria) Dorcas Adesokan (Nigeria) Maria Braimoh | 19–21, 20–22 | (silver) Runner-up |
| 2014 | Uganda International | (Nigeria) Tosin Atolagbe | (Nigeria) Dorcas Adesokan (Nigeria) Augustina Sunday | 14–21, 21–9, 21–12 | (gold) Winner |
| 2013 | Nigeria International | (Nigeria) Tosin Atolagbe | (Nigeria) Augustina Sunday (Nigeria) Deborah Ukeh | 18–21, 13–21 | (silver) Runner-up |

BWF International Challenge tournament
BWF International Series tournament
BWF Future Series tournament
