= Badminton at the 2015 African Games =

Badminton at the 2015 African Games in Brazzaville was held between September 2–9, 2015.

== Venue ==
This tournaments was held at the Gymnase Étienne Mongha, in Ouenzé, Brazzaville, Republic of the Congo.

== Medal summary ==
The table below gives an overview of the medal table and result of badminton at the 2015 African Games:

=== Medal table ===
Rank	Nation	Gold	Silver	Bronze	Total
1	South Africa	3	3	0	6
2	Mauritius	2	1	1	4
3	Seychelles	1	0	2	3
4	Nigeria	0	1	5	6
5	Egypt	0	1	2	3
6	Kenya	0	0	1	1
6	Uganda	0	0	1	1
Totals (7 entries)		6	6	12	24

=== Results ===
Event	Gold	Silver	Bronze
Men's Singles	Jacob Maliekal (RSA)	Prakash Vijayanath (RSA)	Edwin Ekiring (UGA)
Men's Singles	Jacob Maliekal (RSA)	Prakash Vijayanath (RSA)	Clement Krobakpo (NGA)
Men's Doubles	Andries Malan (RSA); Willem Viljoen (RSA)	Ali Ahmed El Khateeb (EGY); Abdelrahman Kashkal (EGY)	Jinkan Ifraimu (NGA); Ola Fagbemi (NGA)
Men's Doubles	Andries Malan (RSA); Willem Viljoen (RSA)	Ali Ahmed El Khateeb (EGY); Abdelrahman Kashkal (EGY)	Enejoh Abah (NGA); Victor Makanju (NGA)
Women's Singles	Kate Foo Kune (MRI)	Grace Gabriel (NGA)	Nicki Chan-Lam (MRI)
Women's Singles	Kate Foo Kune (MRI)	Grace Gabriel (NGA)	Hadia Hosny (EGY)
Women's Doubles	Juliette Ah-Wan (SEY); Allisen Camille (SEY)	Kate Foo Kune (MRI); Yeldy Marie Louison (MRI)	Mercy Joseph (KEN); Lavina Martins (KEN)
Women's Doubles	Juliette Ah-Wan (SEY); Allisen Camille (SEY)	Kate Foo Kune (MRI); Yeldy Marie Louison (MRI)	Grace Gabriel (NGA); Maria Braimoh (NGA)
Mixed Doubles	Andries Malan (RSA); Jennifer Fry (RSA)	Willem Viljoen (RSA); Michelle Butler-Emmett (RSA)	Abdelrahman Kashkal (EGY); Hadia Hosny (EGY)
Mixed Doubles	Andries Malan (RSA); Jennifer Fry (RSA)	Willem Viljoen (RSA); Michelle Butler-Emmett (RSA)	Georgie Cupidon (SEY); Juliette Ah-Wan (SEY)
Team	Mauritius; Aatish Lubah; Christopher Paul; Julien Paul; Nicki Chan-Lam; Kate Foo Kune; Yeldy Marie Louison	South Africa; Andries Malan; Jacob Maliekal; Prakash Vijayanath; Willem Viljoen; Michelle Butler-Emmett; Elme de Villiers; Jennifer Fry; Sandra le Grange	Nigeria; Enejoh Abah; Jinkan Ifraimu; Olorunfemi Elewa; Ola Fagbemi; Clement Krobakpo; Victor Makanju; Tosin Damilola Atolagbe; Augustina Ebhomien Sunday; Grace Gabriel; Susan Ideh; Maria Braimoh; Deborah Ukeh
Team	Mauritius; Aatish Lubah; Christopher Paul; Julien Paul; Nicki Chan-Lam; Kate Foo Kune; Yeldy Marie Louison	South Africa; Andries Malan; Jacob Maliekal; Prakash Vijayanath; Willem Viljoen; Michelle Butler-Emmett; Elme de Villiers; Jennifer Fry; Sandra le Grange	Seychelles; Georgie Cupidon; Kervin Ghislain; Steve Malcouzanne; Juliette Ah-Wan; Allisen Camille; Cynthia Course

== Men's singles ==
=== Seeds ===
- 1. (Uganda) Edwin Ekiring (semifinals)
- 2. (South Africa) Jacob Maliekal (winner)
- 3. (South Africa) Prakash Vijayanath (final)
- 4. (Egypt) Abdelrahman Kashkal (third round)
- 5. (Egypt) Ali Ahmed El Khateeb (quarterfinals)
- 6. (Egypt) Ahmed Salah (quarterfinals)
- 7. (Nigeria) Enejoh Abah (quarterfinals)
- 8. (Egypt) Abdelrahman Abdelhakim (third round)

=== Draw ===
==== Finals ====
Quarterfinals
1	(Uganda) Edwin Ekiring	21	21
(Nigeria) Jinkan Ifraimu	7	17
3	(South Africa) Prakash Vijayanath	21	15	21
5	(Egypt) Ali Ahmed El Khateeb	13	21	13
7	(Nigeria) Enejoh Abah	20	17
(Nigeria) Clement Krobakpo	22	21
6	(Egypt) Ahmed Salah	10	8
2	(South Africa) Jacob Maliekal	21	21

Semifinals
1	(Uganda) Edwin Ekiring	15	20
3	(South Africa) Prakash Vijayanath	21	22
(Nigeria) Clement Krobakpo	18	14
2	(South Africa) Jacob Maliekal	21	21

Final
3	(South Africa) Prakash Vijayanath	17	17
2	(South Africa) Jacob Maliekal	21	21

==== Section 1 ====
First Round
(Algeria) Adel Hamek	21	19	21
(Mauritius) Christopher Paul	15	21	16
(Nigeria) Jinkan Ifraimu	21	21
(Ethiopia) Asnake Getachew Sahilu	13	14

Second Round
1	(Uganda) Edwin Ekiring	21	21
(Ghana) Emmanuel Donkor	15	13
(Ghana) Abraham Ayittey	13	17
(Algeria) Adel Hamek	21	21
8	(Egypt) Abdelrahman Abdelhakim	21	21
(Republic of the Congo) Jonathan Bikoumou	12	15
(Kenya) Geoffrey Shigoli	6	9
(Nigeria) Jinkan Ifraimu	21	21

Third Round
1	(Uganda) Edwin Ekiring	21	19	21
(Algeria) Adel Hamek	15	21	9
8	(Egypt) Abdelrahman Abdelhakim	19	10
(Nigeria) Jinkan Ifraimu	21	21

Quarterfinals
1	(Uganda) Edwin Ekiring	21	21
(Nigeria) Jinkan Ifraimu	7	17

==== Section 2 ====
First Round
(Kenya) Patrick Kinyua	21	21
(Botswana) Orideeste Thela	15	16
(Democratic Republic of the Congo) Mutombo Tshizanga
(Republic of the Congo) Mbongo Dmitri	w/o
(Republic of the Congo) Devins Nestar Mananga Nzoussi	9	10
(Mauritius) Julien Paul	21	21

Second Round
3	(South Africa) Prakash Vijayanath	21	21
(Republic of the Congo) Souriya Michael Sanat Mouanda	11	16
(Ethiopia) Yakob Surafel	7	8
(Kenya) Patrick Kinyua	21	21
5	(Egypt) Ali Ahmed El Khateeb	21	21
(Republic of the Congo) Mbongo Dmitri	16	15
(Republic of the Congo) Jordan Oyou	9	16
(Mauritius) Julien Paul	21	21

Third Round
3	(South Africa) Prakash Vijayanath	19	21	21
(Kenya) Patrick Kinyua	21	11	9
5	(Egypt) Ali Ahmed El Khateeb	13	21	21
(Mauritius) Julien Paul	21	18	18

Quarterfinals
3	(South Africa) Prakash Vijayanath	21	15	21
5	(Egypt) Ali Ahmed El Khateeb	13	21	13

==== Section 3 ====
First Round
(Kenya) Victor Odra Munga	21	21
(Ethiopia) Teklu Endale	12	14
(Algeria) Youcef Sabri Medel	22	23
(Kenya) Matheri Joseph Githitu	20	21
(Algeria) Yacoub Benadda	13	17
(Ghana) Daniel Sam	21	21

Second Round
(Kenya) Victor Odra Munga	21	21
(Republic of the Congo) Bliss Bakala	13	8
(Algeria) Youcef Sabri Medel	13	16
7	(Nigeria) Enejoh Abah	21	21
(Ghana) Daniel Sam	17	22	20
(Nigeria) Clement Krobakpo	21	20	22
(Democratic Republic of the Congo) Ja Dimand Okito	2	5
4	(Egypt) Abdelrahman Kashkal	21	21

Third Round
(Kenya) Victor Odra Munga	10	13
7	(Nigeria) Enejoh Abah	21	21
(Nigeria) Clement Krobakpo	21	13	21
4	(Egypt) Abdelrahman Kashkal	12	21	15

Quarterfinals
7	(Nigeria) Enejoh Abah	20	17
(Nigeria) Clement Krobakpo	22	21

==== Section 4 ====
First Round
(Ghana) Michael Opoku Baah	21	21
(Seychelles) Kervin Ghislain	11	16
(Nigeria) Victor Makanju	21	21
(Seychelles) Steve Malcouzanne	16	19

Second Round
(Ghana) Michael Opoku Baah	21	21
(Uganda) Brian Kasirye	12	18
(Algeria) Mohamed Abderrahim Belarbi	15	15
6	(Egypt) Ahmed Salah	21	21
(Nigeria) Victor Makanju	6	5
(Mauritius) Aatish Lubah	21	21
(Botswana) Gaone Tawana	11	15
2	(South Africa) Jacob Maliekal	21	21

Third Round
(Ghana) Michael Opoku Baah	10	15
6	(Egypt) Ahmed Salah	21	21
(Mauritius) Aatish Lubah	16	12
2	(South Africa) Jacob Maliekal	21	21

Quarterfinals
6	(Egypt) Ahmed Salah	10	8
2	(South Africa) Jacob Maliekal	21	21

== Women's singles ==
=== Seeds ===
- 1. (Nigeria) Grace Gabriel (final)
- 2. (Mauritius) Kate Foo Kune (winner)
- 3. (Egypt) Hadia Hosny (semifinals)
- 4. (Uganda) Shamim Bangi (second round)
- 5. (South Africa) Elme de Villiers (quarterfinals)
- 6. (Egypt) Doha Hany (third round)
- 7. (Egypt) Nadine Ashraf (second round)
- 8. (Egypt) Menna Eltanany (third round)

=== Draw ===
==== Finals ====
Quarterfinals
1	(Nigeria) Grace Gabriel	21	21
(Kenya) Mercy Joseph	8	6
(Mauritius) Nicki Chan-Lam	21	21
5	(South Africa) Elme de Villiers	12	15
(Nigeria) Tosin Damilola Atolagbe	21	11	20
3	(Egypt) Hadia Hosny	12	21	22
(South Africa) Michelle Butler-Emmett	10	9
2	(Mauritius) Kate Foo Kune	21	21

Semifinals
1	(Nigeria) Grace Gabriel	21	21
(Mauritius) Nicki Chan-Lam	9	10
3	(Egypt) Hadia Hosny	12	10
2	(Mauritius) Kate Foo Kune	21	21

Final
1	(Nigeria) Grace Gabriel	13	19
2	(Mauritius) Kate Foo Kune	21	21

==== Section 1 ====
Round 1
(Kenya) Mercy Joseph	21	21
(Ghana) Eunice Arthur	9	8

Round 2
1	(Nigeria) Grace Gabriel	21	21
(Republic of the Congo) Aisse Soukouma	4	9
(South Africa) Sandra Le Grange	21	19	14
(Mauritius) Yeldy Marie Louison	17	21	21
6	(Egypt) Doha Hany	21	21
(Ghana) Victoria Asmah	4	7
(Ethiopia) Berhanu Samrawit	12	9
(Kenya) Mercy Joseph	21	21

Round 3
1	(Nigeria) Grace Gabriel	21	21
(Mauritius) Yeldy Marie Louison	10	11
6	(Egypt) Doha Hany	19	21	14
(Kenya) Mercy Joseph	21	19	21

Quarterfinals
1	(Nigeria) Grace Gabriel	21	21
(Kenya) Mercy Joseph	8	6

==== Section 2 ====
Round 1
(Botswana) Botho Makubate	9	22	15
(Algeria) Halla Bouksani	21	20	21
(Seychelles) Cynthia Course	21	21
(Democratic Republic of the Congo) Katambua Odia	6	1

Round 2
4	(Uganda) Shamim Bangi	19	12
(Mauritius) Nicki Chan-Lam	21	21
(Republic of the Congo) Benele Issoko	9	5
(Algeria) Halla Bouksani	21	21
5	(South Africa) Elme de Villiers	21	21
(Nigeria) Uchechukwu Deborah Ukeh	16	16
(Algeria) Baya Nesrine	12	8
(Seychelles) Cynthia Course	21	21

Round 3
(Mauritius) Nicki Chan-Lam	21	21
(Algeria) Halla Bouksani	11	10
5	(South Africa) Elme de Villiers	21	21
(Seychelles) Cynthia Course	17	8

Quarterfinals
(Mauritius) Nicki Chan-Lam	21	21
5	(South Africa) Elme de Villiers	12	15

==== Section 3 ====
Round 1
(Kenya) Sheila Wanjiru	21	14	22
(Ethiopia) Yerusksew Legssey Tura	9	21	24
(Seychelles) Allisen Camille	21	21
(Ghana) Grace Annabel Atipaka	12	9

Round 2
(Ethiopia) Yerusksew Legssey Tura	10	5
(Nigeria) Tosin Damilola Atolagbe	21	21
(Ghana) Gifty Mensah	9	11
8	(Egypt) Menna Eltanany	21	21
(Seychelles) Allisen Camille	22	21
(Algeria) Linda Mazri	20	7
(Uganda) Daisy Nakalyango	14	20
3	(Egypt) Hadia Hosny	21	22

Round 3
(Nigeria) Tosin Damilola Atolagbe	21	21
8	(Egypt) Menna Eltanany	18	10
(Seychelles) Allisen Camille	13	21	14
3	(Egypt) Hadia Hosny	21	18	21

Quarterfinals
(Nigeria) Tosin Damilola Atolagbe	21	11	20
3	(Egypt) Hadia Hosny	12	21	22

==== Section 4 ====
Round 1
(Republic of the Congo) Bztecho Loubaki	3	6
(South Africa) Michelle Butler-Emmett	21	21
(Kenya) Lavina Martins	21	21
(Botswana) Kgalalelo Kegakilwe	14	12

Round 2
(South Africa) Michelle Butler-Emmett	21	21
(Democratic Republic of the Congo) Kanda Mabuta	4	1
(Nigeria) Augustina Ebhomien Sunday	21	21
7	(Egypt) Nadine Ashraf	9	12
(Kenya) Lavina Martins	11	14
(Seychelles) Juliette Ah-Wan	21	21
(Republic of the Congo) Minelie Kassangoyi	3	1
2	(Mauritius) Kate Foo Kune	21	21

Round 3
(South Africa) Michelle Butler-Emmett	21	21
(Nigeria) Augustina Ebhomien Sunday	17	19
(Seychelles) Juliette Ah-Wan	17	10
2	(Mauritius) Kate Foo Kune	21	21

Quarterfinals
(South Africa) Michelle Butler-Emmett	10	9
2	(Mauritius) Kate Foo Kune	21	21

== Men's doubles ==
=== Seeds ===
- 1. (South Africa) Andries Malan / Willem Viljoen (winners)
- 2. (Egypt) Ali Ahmed El Khateeb / Abdelrahman Kashkal (final)
- 3. (Egypt) Abdelrahman Abdelhakim / Ahmed Salah (quarterfinals)
- 4. (Algeria) Mohamed Abderrahime Belarbi / Adel Hamek (quarterfinals)

=== Draw ===
==== Finals ====
Quarterfinals
1	(South Africa) Andries Malan (South Africa) Willem Viljoen	21	21
(Mauritius) Aatish Lubah (Mauritius) Julien Paul	16	16
3	(Egypt) Abdelrahman Abdelhakim (Egypt) Ahmed Salah	12	17
(Nigeria) Jinkan Ifraimu Bulus (Nigeria) Ola Fagbemi	21	21
(Nigeria) Enejoh Abah (Nigeria) Victor Makanju	21	19	21
4	(Algeria) Mohamed Abderrahime Belarbi (Algeria) Adel Hamek	16	21	19
(Seychelles) Georgie Cupidon (Seychelles) Steve Malcouzanne	12	13
2	(Egypt) Ali Ahmed El Khateeb (Egypt) Abdelrahman Kashkal	21	21

Semifinals
1	(South Africa) Andries Malan (South Africa) Willem Viljoen	21	21
(Nigeria) Jinkan Ifraimu Bulus (Nigeria) Ola Fagbemi	16	19
(Nigeria) Enejoh Abah (Nigeria) Victor Makanju	8	15
2	(Egypt) Ali Ahmed El Khateeb (Egypt) Abdelrahman Kashkal	21	21

Final
1	(South Africa) Andries Malan (South Africa) Willem Viljoen	21	21
2	(Egypt) Ali Ahmed El Khateeb (Egypt) Abdelrahman Kashkal	10	13

==== Section 1 ====
Round 1
(Algeria) Mohamed Amine Guelmaoui (Algeria) Youcef Sabri Medel	17	19
(Ghana) Daniel Sam (Ghana) Emmanuel Yaw Donkor	21	21

Round 2
1	(South Africa) Andries Malan (South Africa) Willem Viljoen	21	21
(Republic of the Congo) Sanat Michael Souriya Mouanda (Republic of the Congo) Jordan Oyou	5	11
(Ethiopia) Asnake Getachew Sahilu (Ethiopia) Yakob Surafel	7	7
(Mauritius) Aatish Lubah (Mauritius) Julien Paul	21	21
3	(Egypt) Abdelrahman Abdelhakim (Egypt) Ahmed Salah	21	21
(Republic of the Congo) Devins Nestar Mananga Nzoussi (Republic of the Congo) Bernard Ndaba	8	13
(Nigeria) Jinkan Ifraimu Bulus (Nigeria) Ola Fagbemi	21	21
(Ghana) Daniel Sam (Ghana) Emmanuel Yaw Donkor	13	15

Quarterfinals
1	(South Africa) Andries Malan (South Africa) Willem Viljoen	21	21
(Mauritius) Aatish Lubah (Mauritius) Julien Paul	16	19
3	(Egypt) Abdelrahman Abdelhakim (Egypt) Ahmed Salah	12	17
(Nigeria) Jinkan Ifraimu Bulus (Nigeria) Ola Fagbemi	21	21

Semifinals
1	(South Africa) Andries Malan (South Africa) Willem Viljoen	21	21
(Nigeria) Jinkan Ifraimu Bulus (Nigeria) Ola Fagbemi	16	19

==== Section 2 ====
Round 1
(Democratic Republic of the Congo) Dimand Ja Okito (Democratic Republic of the Congo) Mutombo Tshizanga	0	0
(Nigeria) Enejoh Abah (Nigeria) Victor Makanju	21	21

Round 2
(Nigeria) Enejoh Abah (Nigeria) Victor Makanju	21	21
(Republic of the Congo) Bliss Bakala (Republic of the Congo) Pitchou I	13	18
(Botswana) Gaone Tawana (Botswana) Orideetse Thela	10	19
4	(Algeria) Mohamed Abderrahime Belarbi (Algeria) Adel Hamek	21	21
(Seychelles) Georgie Cupidon (Seychelles) Steve Malcouzanne	21	21
(Kenya) Matheri Joseph Githitu (Kenya) Patrick Kinyua Mbogo	17	15
(Ghana) Abraham Ayittey (Ghana) Michael Opoku Baah	14	13
2	(Egypt) Ali Ahmed El Khateeb (Egypt) Abdelrahman Kashkal	21	21

Quarterfinals
(Nigeria) Enejoh Abah (Nigeria) Victor Makanju	21	19	21
4	(Algeria) Mohamed Abderrahime Belarbi (Algeria) Adel Hamek	16	21	19
(Seychelles) Georgie Cupidon (Seychelles) Steve Malcouzanne	12	13
2	(Egypt) Ali Ahmed El Khateeb (Egypt) Abdelrahman Kashkal	21	21

Semifinals
(Nigeria) Enejoh Abah (Nigeria) Victor Makanju	8	15
2	(Egypt) Ali Ahmed El Khateeb (Egypt) Abdelrahman Kashkal	21	21

== Women's doubles ==
=== Seeds ===
- 1. (Egypt) Nadine Ashraf/Menna Eltanany (quarterfinals)
- 2. (Egypt) Doha Hany/Hadia Hosny (quarterfinals)
- 3. (South Africa) Jennifer Fry/Sandra Le Grange (second round)
- 4. (South Africa) Michelle Butler-Emmett/Elme De Villiers (quarterfinals)

=== Draw ===
==== Finals ====
Quarterfinals
1	(Egypt) Nadine Ashraf (Egypt) Menna Eltanany	21	17	19
(Kenya) Mercy Joseph (Kenya) Lavina Martins	14	21	21
(Nigeria) Tosin Damilola Atolagbe (Nigeria) Susan Ideh	15	14
(Mauritius) Kate Foo Kune (Mauritius) Yeldy Marie Louison	21	21
(Nigeria) Grace Gabriel (Nigeria) Braimoh Maria	21	21
4	(South Africa) Michelle Butler-Emmett (South Africa) Elme De Villiers	16	18
(Seychelles) Juliette Ah-Wan (Seychelles) Allisen Camille	18	21	21
2	(Egypt) Doha Hany (Egypt) Hadia Hosny	21	17	17

Semifinals
(Kenya) Mercy Joseph (Kenya) Lavina Martins	10	11
(Mauritius) Kate Foo Kune (Mauritius) Yeldy Marie Louison	21	21
(Nigeria) Grace Gabriel (Nigeria) Braimoh Maria	13	16
(Seychelles) Juliette Ah-Wan (Seychelles) Allisen Camille	21	21

Final
(Mauritius) Kate Foo Kune (Mauritius) Yeldy Marie Louison	20	21	14
(Seychelles) Juliette Ah-Wan (Seychelles) Allisen Camille	22	18	21

==== Section 1 ====
Round 1
(Algeria) Halla Bouksani (Algeria) Linda Mazri	12	23
(Ethiopia) Berhanu Samrawit (Ethiopia) Yerusksew Legssey Tura	21	25

Round 2
1	(Egypt) Nadine Ashraf (Egypt) Menna Eltanany	21	21
(Ghana) Victoria Asmah (Ghana) Gifty Mensah	14	15
(Kenya) Mercy Joseph (Kenya) Lavina Martins	21	21
(Republic of the Congo) Benele Issoko (Republic of the Congo) Bztecho Loubaki	10	6
3	(South Africa) Jennifer Fry (South Africa) Sandra Le Grange	18	21	12
(Nigeria) Tosin Damilola Atolagbe (Nigeria) Susan Ideh	21	15	21
(Mauritius) Kate Foo Kune (Mauritius) Yeldy Marie Louison	21	21
(Ethiopia) Berhanu Samrawit (Ethiopia) Yerusksew Legssey Tura	6	11

Quarterfinals
1	(Egypt) Nadine Ashraf (Egypt) Menna Eltanany	21	17	19
(Kenya) Mercy Joseph (Kenya) Lavina Martins	14	21	21
(Nigeria) Tosin Damilola Atolagbe (Nigeria) Susan Ideh	15	14
(Mauritius) Kate Foo Kune (Mauritius) Yeldy Marie Louison	21	21

Semifinals
(Kenya) Mercy Joseph (Kenya) Lavina Martins	10	11
(Mauritius) Kate Foo Kune (Mauritius) Yeldy Marie Louison	21	21

==== Section 2 ====
Round 1
(Nigeria) Grace Gabriel (Nigeria) Braimoh Maria	21	21
(Uganda) Shamim Bangi (Uganda) Daisy Nakalyango	0	0

Round 2
(Nigeria) Grace Gabriel (Nigeria) Braimoh Maria	21	21
(Ghana) Eunice Arthur (Ghana) Grace Atipaka	6	7
(Republic of the Congo) Kanda Mabuta (Republic of the Congo) Katambua Odia	2	4
4	(South Africa) Michelle Butler-Emmett (South Africa) Elme De Villiers	21	21
(Seychelles) Juliette Ah-Wan (Seychelles) Allisen Camille	21	21
(Botswana) Kgalalelo Kegakilwe (Botswana) Botho Makubate	6	8
(Republic of the Congo) Minelie Kassangoyi (Republic of the Congo) Aisse Soukouma	10	11
2	(Egypt) Doha Hany (Egypt) Hadia Hosny	21	21

Quarterfinals
(Nigeria) Grace Gabriel (Nigeria) Braimoh Maria	21	21
4	(South Africa) Michelle Butler-Emmett (South Africa) Elme De Villiers	16	18
(Seychelles) Juliette Ah-Wan (Seychelles) Allisen Camille	18	21	21
2	(Egypt) Doha Hany (Egypt) Hadia Hosny	21	17	17

Semifinals
(Nigeria) Grace Gabriel (Nigeria) Braimoh Maria	13	16
(Seychelles) Juliette Ah-Wan (Seychelles) Allisen Camille	21	21

== Mixed doubles ==
=== Seeds ===
- 1. (Egypt) Abdelrahman Kashkal / Hadia Hosny (semifinals)
- 2. (Egypt) Ali Ahmed El Khateeb / Doha Hany (second round)
- 3. (South Africa) Andries Malan / Jennifer Fry (winners)
- 4. (Egypt) Ahmed Salah / Menna Eltanany (quarterfinals)

=== Draw ===
==== Finals ====
Quarterfinals
1	(Egypt) Abdelrahman Kashkal (Egypt) Hadia Hosny	21	21
(Mauritius) Christopher Paul (Mauritius) Yeldy Marie Louison	19	12
4	(Egypt) Ahmed Salah (Egypt) Menna Eltanany	9	15
(South Africa) Willem Viljoen (South Africa) Michelle Butler-Emmett	21	21
(Nigeria) Ola Fagbemi (Nigeria) Braimoh Maria	14	14
3	(South Africa) Andries Malan (South Africa) Jennifer Fry	21	21
(Seychelles) Steve Malcouzanne (Seychelles) Cynthia Course	13	15
(Seychelles) Georgie Cupidon (Seychelles) Juliette Ah-Wan	21	21

Semifinals
1	(Egypt) Abdelrahman Kashkal (Egypt) Hadia Hosny	17	19
(South Africa) Willem Viljoen (South Africa) Michelle Butler-Emmett	21	21
3	(South Africa) Andries Malan (South Africa) Jennifer Fry	21	21
(Seychelles) Georgie Cupidon (Seychelles) Juliette Ah-Wan	15	18

Final
(South Africa) Willem Viljoen (South Africa) Michelle Butler-Emmett	17	21
3	(South Africa) Andries Malan (South Africa) Jennifer Fry	21	23

==== Section 1 ====
Round 1
(Nigeria) Olorunfemi Elewa (Nigeria) Susan Ideh	23	21
(Algeria) Mohamed Abderrahime Belarbi (Algeria) Halla Bouksani	21	16
(Mauritius) Christopher Paul (Mauritius) Yeldy Marie Louison	21	21
(Republic of the Congo) Mbongo Dmitri (Republic of the Congo) Aisse Soukouma	12	15
(Ethiopia) Yakob Surafel (Ethiopia) Berhanu Samrawit	19	19
(Kenya) Matheri Joseph Githitu (Kenya) Lavina Martins	21	21
(Seychelles) Kervin Ghislain (Seychelles) Allisen Camille	19	17
(Nigeria) Clement Krobakpo (Nigeria) Augustina Ebhomien Sunday	21	21
(Ghana) Emmanuel Yaw Donkor (Ghana) Victoria Asmah	21	21
(Democratic Republic of the Congo) Dimand Ja Okito (Democratic Republic of the Congo) Katambua Odia	3	10
(Botswana) Gaone Tawana (Botswana) Kgalalelo Kegakilwe	17	15
(South Africa) Willem Viljoen (South Africa) Michelle Butler-Emmett	21	21

Round 2
1	(Egypt) Abdelrahman Kashkal (Egypt) Hadia Hosny	21	19	21
(Nigeria) Olorunfemi Elewa (Nigeria) Susan Ideh	19	21	15
(Mauritius) Christopher Paul (Mauritius) Yeldy Marie Louison	21	21
(Kenya) Matheri Joseph Githitu (Kenya) Lavina Martins	11	12
4	(Egypt) Ahmed Salah (Egypt) Menna Eltanany	16	21	23
(Nigeria) Clement Krobakpo (Nigeria) Augustina Ebhomien Sunday	21	19	21
(Ghana) Emmanuel Yaw Donkor (Ghana) Victoria Asmah	17	8
(South Africa) Willem Viljoen (South Africa) Michelle Butler-Emmett	21	21

Quarterfinals
1	(Egypt) Abdelrahman Kashkal (Egypt) Hadia Hosny	21	21
(Mauritius) Christopher Paul (Mauritius) Yeldy Marie Louison	19	12
4	(Egypt) Ahmed Salah (Egypt) Menna Eltanany	9	15
(South Africa) Willem Viljoen (South Africa) Michelle Butler-Emmett	21	21

Semifinals
1	(Egypt) Abdelrahman Kashkal (Egypt) Hadia Hosny	17	19
(South Africa) Willem Viljoen (South Africa) Michelle Butler-Emmett	21	21

==== Section 2 ====
Round 1
(Kenya) Patrick Kinyua Mbogo (Kenya) Mercy Joseph	21	21
(Ghana) Michael Opoku Baah (Ghana) Grace Atipaka	7	10
(Nigeria) Ola Fagbemi (Nigeria) Braimoh Maria	21	21
(Algeria) Mohamed Amine Guelmaoui (Algeria) Linda Mazri	14	16
(Algeria) Adel Hamek (Algeria) Baya Nesrine	21	21
(Republic of the Congo) Bernard Ndaba (Republic of the Congo) Benele Issoko	10	6
(Botswana) Orideetse Thela (Botswana) Botho Makubate	8	15
3	(South Africa) Andries Malan (South Africa) Jennifer Fry	21	21
(Democratic Republic of the Congo) Mutombo Tshizanga (Democratic Republic of the Congo) Kanda Mabuta	0	0
(Ethiopia) Teklu Endale (Ethiopia) Yerusksew Legssey Tura	21	21
(Seychelles) Steve Malcouzanne (Seychelles) Cynthia Course	21	21
(Republic of the Congo) Pitchou I (Republic of the Congo) Bztecho Loubaki	12	12
(Seychelles) Georgie Cupidon (Seychelles) Juliette Ah-Wan	21	21
(Ghana) Abraham Ayittey (Ghana) Eunice Arthur	7	11

Round 2
(Kenya) Patrick Kinyua Mbogo (Kenya) Mercy Joseph	11	18
(Nigeria) Ola Fagbemi (Nigeria) Braimoh Maria	21	21
(Algeria) Adel Hamek (Algeria) Baya Nesrine	24	12
3	(South Africa) Andries Malan (South Africa) Jennifer Fry	26	21
(Ethiopia) Teklu Endale (Ethiopia) Yerusksew Legssey Tura	13	9
(Seychelles) Steve Malcouzanne (Seychelles) Cynthia Course	21	21
(Seychelles) Georgie Cupidon (Seychelles) Juliette Ah-Wan	21	21
2	(Egypt) Ali Ahmed El Khateeb (Egypt) Doha Hany	13	17

Quarterfinals
(Nigeria) Ola Fagbemi (Nigeria) Braimoh Maria	14	14
3	(South Africa) Andries Malan (South Africa) Jennifer Fry	21	21
(Seychelles) Steve Malcouzanne (Seychelles) Cynthia Course	13	15
(Seychelles) Georgie Cupidon (Seychelles) Juliette Ah-Wan	21	21

Semifinals
3	(South Africa) Andries Malan (South Africa) Jennifer Fry	21	21
(Seychelles) Georgie Cupidon (Seychelles) Juliette Ah-Wan	15	18

== Mixed team event ==
=== Group stage ===
==== Group 1 ====
Team	Pld	W	L	MF	MA	MD	Pts
Mauritius	2	2	0	9	1	+8	2
Ghana	2	1	1	6	6	0	1
Congo	2	0	2	0	10	−10	0

2 September 2015
Mauritius	5–0	Congo
Ghana	5–0	Congo
3 September 2015
Mauritius	4–1	Ghana

==== Group 2 ====
Team	Pld	W	L	MF	MA	MD	Pts
Nigeria	2	2	0	8	2	+6	2
Uganda	2	1	1	6	4	+2	1
Botswana	2	0	2	1	9	−8	0

2 September 2015
Nigeria	5–0	Botswana
Uganda	4–1	Botswana
3 September 2015
Nigeria	3–2	Uganda

==== Group 3 ====
Team	Pld	W	L	MF	MA	MD	Pts
South Africa	2	2	0	9	1	+8	2
Egypt	2	1	1	6	4	+2	1
Kenya	2	0	2	0	10	-10	0

2 September 2015
South Africa	5–0	Kenya
3 September 2015
Egypt	5–0	Kenya
South Africa	4–1	Egypt

==== Group 4 ====
Team	Pld	W	L	MF	MA	MD	Pts
Seychelles	3	3	0	14	1	+13	3
Algeria	3	2	1	11	4	+7	2
Ethiopia	3	1	2	5	10	−5	1
DR Congo	3	0	3	0	15	−15	0

2 September 2015
Algeria	5–0	Ethiopia
Seychelles	5–0	DR Congo
Seychelles	5–0	Ethiopia
3 September 2015
Algeria	5–0	DR Congo
Ethiopia	5–0	DR Congo
Seychelles	4–1	Algeria

=== Knockout stage ===
Quarter-finals
4 September
South Africa	3
Uganda	1
4 September
Seychelles	3
Algeria	1
4 September
Mauritius	3
Ghana	1
4 September
Nigeria	3
Egypt	1

Semi-finals
5 September
South Africa	3
Seychelles	0
5 September
Mauritius	3
Nigeria	0

Final
5 September
South Africa	2
Mauritius	3
