= Jennifer Fry =

South African badminton player

Personal information
- Born: 24 March 1989 (age 37) Pretoria, South Africa
- Height: 1.69 m (5 ft 7 in)
- Weight: 59 kg (130 lb)

Sport
- Country: South Africa
- Sport: Badminton

Women's & mixed doubles
- Highest ranking: 97 (WD 30 November 2017); 83 (XD 28 January 2016)
- BWF profile
Medal record
Women's badminton
Representing South Africa
All-Africa Games
Gold medal – first place	2015 Brazzaville	Mixed doubles
Silver medal – second place	2015 Brazzaville	Mixed team
African Championships
Gold medal – first place	2017 Benoni	Women's doubles
Gold medal – first place	2017 Benoni	Mixed doubles
Gold medal – first place	2014 Gaborone	Mixed team
Gold medal – first place	2013 Rose Hill	Mixed team
Silver medal – second place	2017 Benoni	Mixed team
Silver medal – second place	2014 Gaborone	Mixed doubles
Silver medal – second place	2013 Rose Hill	Mixed doubles
Bronze medal – third place	2014 Gaborone	Women's doubles
Bronze medal – third place	2013 Rose Hill	Women's doubles

Jennifer Fry (born 24 March 1989) is a South African badminton player. She was a 2015 All-Africa Games gold medalist in the mixed doubles event, also won the silver medal in the mixed team event. In 2017, she claimed two gold medals at the 2017 African Championships, won the title in the women's and mixed doubles event.

== Achievements ==
=== All-Africa Games ===
Mixed doubles
Year	Venue	Partner	Opponent	Score	Result
2015	Gymnase Étienne Mongha; Brazzaville, Republic of the Congo	(South Africa) Andries Malan	(South Africa) Willem Viljoen (South Africa) Michelle Butler-Emmett	21–17, 23–21	Gold

=== African Championships ===
Women's doubles
Year	Venue	Partner	Opponent	Score	Result
2017	John Barrable Hall; Benoni, South Africa	(South Africa) Michelle Butler-Emmett	(Egypt) Doha Hany (Egypt) Hadia Hosny	21–12, 15–21, 21–12	Gold
2014	Lobatse Stadium; Gaborone, Botswana	(South Africa) Elme de Villiers	(Seychelles) Juliette Ah-Wan (Seychelles) Alisen Camille	14–21, 21–15, 18–21	Bronze
2013	National Badminton Centre; Rose Hill, Mauritius	(South Africa) Michelle Butler-Emmett	(Mauritius) Shama Aboobakar (Mauritius) Yeldy Louison	17–21, 14–21	Bronze

Mixed doubles
Year	Venue	Partner	Opponent	Score	Result
2017	John Barrable Hall; Benoni, South Africa	(South Africa) Andries Malan	(Mauritius) Georges Julien Paul (Mauritius) Kate Foo Kune	21–19, 19–21, 21–19	Gold
2014	Lobatse Stadium; Gaborone, Botswana	(South Africa) Andries Malan	(South Africa) Willem Viljoen (South Africa) Michelle Butler-Emmett	18–21, 17–21	Silver
2013	National Badminton Centre; Rose Hill, Mauritius	(South Africa) Andries Malan	(South Africa) Willem Viljoen (South Africa) Michelle Butler-Emmett	18–21, 22–20, 9–21	Silver

=== BWF International Challenge/Series ===
Women's doubles
Year	Tournament	Partner	Opponent	Score	Result
2018	South Africa International	(South Africa) Michelle Butler-Emmett	(South Africa) Lehandre Schoeman (South Africa) Johanita Scholtz	17–21, 16–21	(silver) Runner-up
2018	Botswana International	(South Africa) Michelle Butler-Emmett	(Botswana) Tessa Kabelo (Botswana) Tebogo Ndzinge	21–7, 21–9	(gold) Winner
2017	South Africa International	(South Africa) Michelle Butler-Emmett	(South Africa) Demi Botha (South Africa) Lee-Ann De Wet	21–17, 21–19	(gold) Winner
2017	Botswana International	(South Africa) Michelle Butler-Emmett	(Italy) Silvia Garino (Italy) Lisa Iversen	26–24, 21–16	(gold) Winner
2016	South Africa International	(South Africa) Michelle Butler-Emmett	(South Africa) Elme de Villiers (South Africa) Sandra Le Grange	21–15, 21–16	(gold) Winner

Mixed doubles
Year	Tournament	Partner	Opponent	Score	Result
2018	South Africa International	(South Africa) Andries Malan	(Jordan) Bahaedeen Ahmad Alshannik (Jordan) Domou Amro	21–14, 21–16	(gold) Winner
2018	Botswana International	(South Africa) Andries Malan	(Jordan) Bahaedeen Ahmad Alshannik (Jordan) Domou Amro	21–18, 20–22, 21–19	(gold) Winner
2017	South Africa International	(South Africa) Andries Malan	(India) Saurabh Sharma (India) Anoushka Parikh	21–19, 21–19	(gold) Winner
2017	Botswana International	(South Africa) Andries Malan	(Mauritius) Georges Paul (Mauritius) Aurélie Allet	21–15, 21–13	(gold) Winner
2015	South Africa International	(South Africa) Andries Malan	(Egypt) Abdelrahman Kashkal (Egypt) Hadia Hosny	12–21, 21–19, 21–18	(gold) Winner
2015	Mauritius International	(South Africa) Andries Malan	(Mauritius) Sahir Edoo (Mauritius) Yeldy Louison	21–18, 21–16	(gold) Winner
2014	Mauritius International	(South Africa) Andries Malan	(Germany) Andreas Heinz (Germany) Annika Horbach	21–15, 18–21, 16–21	(silver) Runner-up
2014	Lagos International	(South Africa) Andries Malan	(Nigeria) Enejoh Abah (Nigeria) Tosin Damilola Atolagbe	24–26, 20–22	(silver) Runner-up

BWF International Challenge tournament
BWF International Series tournament
BWF Future Series tournament
