= Steve Malcouzanne =

Seychellois badminton player (born 1982)

Personal information
- Born: Steve Hansley Malcouzanne; 21 June 1982 (age 44) Victoria, Seychelles
- Height: 1.62 m (5 ft 4 in)
- Weight: 63 kg (139 lb)

Sport
- Country: Seychelles
- Sport: Badminton
- Coached by: Luo Guo Hui; Gerald Bibi; Calix Francour

Men's singles & doubles
- Highest ranking: 223 (MS 11 March 2010); 173 (MD 17 September 2015); 289 (XD 3 May 2012)
- BWF profile
Medal record
men's badminton
Representing Seychelles
All-Africa Games
Bronze medal – third place	2015 Brazzaville	Mixed team
Bronze medal – third place	2011 Maputo	Men's doubles
Bronze medal – third place	2011 Maputo	Mixed team
Bronze medal – third place	2007 Algiers	Mixed team
Bronze medal – third place	2003 Abuja	Mixed team
African Championships
Gold medal – first place	2007 Rose Hill	Mixed team
Silver medal – second place	2009 Nairobi	Mixed team
Silver medal – second place	2007 Rose Hill	Men's doubles
Bronze medal – third place	2014 Gaborone	Men's doubles
Bronze medal – third place	2014 Gaborone	Mixed team
Bronze medal – third place	2013 Rose Hill	Mixed team
Bronze medal – third place	2009 Nairobi	Men's singles
Bronze medal – third place	2009 Nairobi	Men's doubles
Bronze medal – third place	2006 Algiers	Men's doubles
Bronze medal – third place	2006 Algiers	Mixed team

Steve Hansley Malcouzanne (born 21 June 1982) is a Seychellois badminton player. He competed at the 2006, 2010, 2014, and 2018 Commonwealth Games. He was the Seychelles flag bearer during the 2010 Commonwealth Games opening ceremony in New Delhi, India. He was named 2009 Sportsman of the Year at the Seychelles Sports Awards.

== Achievements ==
=== All-Africa Games ===
Men's doubles
Year	Venue	Partner	Opponent	Score	Result
2011	Escola Josina Machel; Maputo, Mozambique	(Seychelles) Georgie Cupidon	(Nigeria) Jinkan Ifraimu (Nigeria) Ola Fagbemi	16–21, 10–21	Bronze

=== African Championships ===
Men's singles
Year	Venue	Opponent	Score	Result
2009	Moi International Sports Complex; Nairobi, Kenya	(Nigeria) Jinkan Ifraimu	18–21, 13–21	Bronze

Men's doubles
Year	Venue	Partner	Opponent	Score	Result
2014	Lobatse Stadium; Gaborone, Botswana	(Seychelles) Georgie Cupidon	(South Africa) Andries Malan (South Africa) Willem Viljoen	12–21, 10–21	Bronze
2009	Moi International Sports Complex; Nairobi, Kenya	(Seychelles) Georgie Cupidon	(Nigeria) Jinkan Ifraimu (Nigeria) Ola Fagbemi	10–21, 18–21	Bronze
2007	Stadium Badminton; Rose Hill, Mauritius	(Seychelles) Georgie Cupidon	(South Africa) Chris Dednam (South Africa) Roelof Dednam	17–21, 16–21	Silver
2006	Algiers, Algeria	(Seychelles) Georgie Cupidon	(South Africa) Chris Dednam (South Africa) Roelof Dednam	23–25, 25–23, 13–21	Bronze

=== BWF International Challenge/Series ===
Men's doubles
Year	Tournament	Partner	Opponent	Score	Result
2008	Kenya International	(Seychelles) Georgie Cupidon	(Kenya) Himesh Patel (Kenya) Patrick Ruto	21–11, 21–19	(gold) Winner

Mixed doubles
Year	Tournament	Partner	Opponent	Score	Result
1999	Kenya International	(Seychelles) Lucia Banane	(Seychelles) Georgie Cupidon (Seychelles) Juliette Ah-Wan	10–15, 6–15	(silver) Runner-up

BWF International Challenge tournament
BWF International Series tournament
BWF Future Series tournament
