= 2011 African Badminton Championships =

Tournament details
- Dates: 4-12 May 2011
- Venue: Salle Couverte Zerktouni
- Location: Marrakesh, Morocco

The 2011 African Badminton Championships is a continental badminton championships organized by the Badminton Confederation of Africa. This championships were held in Marrakesh, Morocco between 4-12 May.

== Medalists ==
Event	Gold	Silver	Bronze
Men's singles	(Nigeria) Jinkam Ifraimu	(Nigeria) Ola Fagbemi	(Uganda) Edwin Ekiring
Men's singles	(Nigeria) Jinkam Ifraimu	(Nigeria) Ola Fagbemi	(South Africa) Willem Viljoen
Women's singles	(South Africa) Stacey Doubell	(South Africa) Kerry-Lee Harrington	(Nigeria) Susan Ideh
Women's singles	(South Africa) Stacey Doubell	(South Africa) Kerry-Lee Harrington	(Nigeria) Grace Gabriel
Men's doubles	(South Africa) Dorian James and Willem Viljoen	(Nigeria) Jinkam Ifraimu and Ola Fagbemi	(Nigeria) Eneojo Abah and Victor Makanju
Men's doubles	(South Africa) Dorian James and Willem Viljoen	(Nigeria) Jinkam Ifraimu and Ola Fagbemi	(Egypt) Abdelrahman Kashkal and Ali El Khateeb
Women's doubles	(South Africa) Michelle Edwards and Annari Viljoen	(Nigeria) Maria Braimah and Susan Ideh	(Egypt) Hadia Hosny and Dina Nagy
Women's doubles	(South Africa) Michelle Edwards and Annari Viljoen	(Nigeria) Maria Braimah and Susan Ideh	(Mauritius) Karen Foo Kune and Kate Foo Kune
Mixed doubles	(South Africa) Willem Viljoen and Annari Viljoen	(South Africa) Dorian James and Michelle Edwards	(Nigeria) Eneojo Abah and Grace Gabriel
Mixed doubles	(South Africa) Willem Viljoen and Annari Viljoen	(South Africa) Dorian James and Michelle Edwards	(Nigeria) Adamu J and Grace Daniel
Teams	South Africa; Dorian James, Jacob Maliekal, Willem Viljoen; Annari Viljoen, Kerry-Lee Harrington, Michelle Butler-Emmett, Michelle Edwards	Nigeria; Eneojo Abah, Ibrahim Adamu, Jinkam Ifraimu, Ola Fagbemi, Victor Makanju, Fatima Azeez, Maria Braimah, Grace Daniel, Grace Gabriel, Susan Ideh	Egypt; Abdelrahman Kashkal, Ahmed salah, Ali El Khateeb, Mahmoud El Sayaad; Alaa Youssef, Dina Nagy, Hadia Hosny
Teams	South Africa; Dorian James, Jacob Maliekal, Willem Viljoen; Annari Viljoen, Kerry-Lee Harrington, Michelle Butler-Emmett, Michelle Edwards	Nigeria; Eneojo Abah, Ibrahim Adamu, Jinkam Ifraimu, Ola Fagbemi, Victor Makanju, Fatima Azeez, Maria Braimah, Grace Daniel, Grace Gabriel, Susan Ideh	Mauritius; Christopher Paul, Denneshsing Baboolall, Daveen Pachee, Yoni Louison; Karen Foo Kune, Kate Foo Kune, Shama Aboobakar, Yeldy Louison

=== Medal table ===
* Host nation (Morocco)

Rank	Nation	Gold	Silver	Bronze	Total
1	South Africa	5	2	1	8
2	Nigeria	1	4	5	10
3	Egypt	0	0	3	3
4	Mauritius	0	0	2	2
5	Uganda	0	0	1	1
Totals (5 entries)		6	6	12	24
