= Susan Ideh =

Nigerian badminton player (born 1987)

Personal information
- Born: Susan Funaya Ideh; 5 May 1987 (age 39)
- Height: 1.65 m (5 ft 5 in)
- Weight: 65 kg (143 lb)

Sport
- Country: Nigeria
- Sport: Badminton

Women's
- Highest ranking: 155 (WS) 18 Mar 2010; 84 (WD) 9 Dec 2010; 101 (XD) 22 Mar 2012
- BWF profile
Medal record
Badminton
Representing Nigeria
All-Africa Games
Gold medal – first place	2011 Maputo	Women's singles
Gold medal – first place	2011 Maputo	Mixed team
Gold medal – first place	2007 Algiers	Mixed team
Silver medal – second place	2007 Algiers	Women's doubles
Silver medal – second place	2003 Abuja	Women's doubles
Silver medal – second place	2003 Abuja	Mixed team
Bronze medal – third place	2015 Brazzaville	Mixed team
Bronze medal – third place	2003 Abuja	Mixed doubles
African Championships
Silver medal – second place	2012 Addis Ababa	Women's doubles
Silver medal – second place	2011 Marrakesh	Women's doubles
Silver medal – second place	2011 Marrakesh	Mixed team
Silver medal – second place	2010 Kampala	Women's doubles
Bronze medal – third place	2012 Addis Ababa	Women's singles
Bronze medal – third place	2012 Addis Ababa	Mixed doubles
Bronze medal – third place	2011 Marrakesh	Women's singles
Bronze medal – third place	2009 Nairobi	Women's singles
Bronze medal – third place	2004 Rose Hill	Women's singles
Africa Team Championships
Silver medal – second place	2012 Addis Ababa	Women's team
Silver medal – second place	2008 Rose Hill	Women's team
Bronze medal – third place	2010 Kampala	Women's team

Susan Funaya Ideh (born 5 May 1987) is a Nigerian female badminton player. She competed at the 2010 Commonwealth Games in New Delhi, India. In 2015, she won the women's singles gold at the All-Africa Games In Maputo, Mozambique.

== Achievements ==
=== All-Africa Games ===
Women's singles
Year	Venue	Opponent	Score	Result
2011	Escola Josina Machel, Maputo, Mozambique	(Nigeria) Grace Gabriel	21–16, 21–19	Gold

Women's doubles
Year	Venue	Partner	Opponent	Score	Result
2007	Salle OMS El Biar; Algiers, Algeria	(Nigeria) Grace Daniel	(South Africa) Michelle Edwards (South Africa) Chantal Botts	12–21, 21–9, 20–22	Silver
2003	Indoor Sports Halls National Stadium; Abuja, Nigeria	(Nigeria) Grace Daniel	(South Africa) Michelle Edwards (South Africa) Chantal Botts		Silver

Mixed doubles
Year	Venue	Partner	Opponent	Score	Result
2003	Indoor Sports Halls National Stadium; Abuja, Nigeria	(Nigeria) Abimbola Odejoke	(South Africa)		Bronze

=== African Championships ===
Women's singles
Year	Venue	Opponent	Score	Result
2012	Arat Kilo Hall, Addis Ababa, Ethiopia	(Nigeria) Fatima Azeez	16–21, 11–21	Bronze
2011	Marrakesh, Morocco	(South Africa) Stacey Doubell	21–17, 18–21, 13–21	Bronze
2009	Nairobi, Kenya	(Seychelles) Juliette Ah-Wan	17–21, 21–17, 12–21	Bronze
2004	Beau Bassin-Rose Hill, Mauritius	(South Africa) Chantal Botts	9–11, 0–11	Bronze

Women's doubles
Year	Venue	Partner	Opponent	Score	Result
2012	Arat Kilo Hall, Addis Ababa, Ethiopia	(Nigeria) Grace Daniel	(South Africa) Annari Viljoen (South Africa) Michelle Edwards	16–21, 19–21	Silver
2011	Marrakesh, Morocco	(Nigeria) Maria Braimoh	(South Africa) Annari Viljoen (South Africa) Michelle Edwards	9–21, 16–21	Silver
2010	Kampala, Uganda	(Nigeria) Maria Braimoh	(South Africa) Annari Viljoen (South Africa) Michelle Edwards	6–21, 6–21	Silver

Mixed doubles
Year	Venue	Partner	Opponent	Score	Result
2012	Arat Kilo Hall, Addis Ababa, Ethiopia	(Nigeria) Ola Fagbemi	(South Africa) Dorian James (South Africa) Michelle Edwards	18–21, 17–21	Bronze

=== BWF International Challenge/Series ===
Women's singles
Year	Tournament	Opponent	Score	Result
2009	Kenya International	(Egypt) Dina Nagy	8–21, 16–21	(silver) Runner-up

Women's doubles
Year	Tournament	Partner	Opponent	Score	Result
2010	Kenya International	(Nigeria) Maria Braimoh	(South Africa) Annari Viljoen (South Africa) Michelle Edwards	10–21, 21–12, 10–21	(silver) Runner-up
2009	Mauritius International	(Seychelles) Juliette Ah-Wan	(Mauritius) Shama Aboobakar (Mauritius) Amrita Sawaram	21–18, 21–17	(gold) Winner

Mixed doubles
Year	Tournament	Partner	Opponent	Score	Result
2015	Nigeria International	(Nigeria) Olorunfemi Elewa	(Ghana) Daniel Sam (Ghana) Gifty Mensah	21–19, 21–17	(gold) Winner
2014	Nigeria International	(Nigeria) Jinkan Ifraimu	(Nigeria) Ola Fagbemi (Nigeria) Dorcas Ajoke Adesokan	8–11, 11–4, 7–11, 11–10, 11–8	(gold) Winner
2011	Botswana International	(Nigeria) Ola Fagbemi	(South Africa) Dorian James (South Africa) Michelle Edwards	16–21, 21–11, 19–21	(silver) Runner-up
2010	Kenya International	(Nigeria) Jinkan Ifraimu	(South Africa) Wiaan Viljoen (South Africa) Annari Viljoen	12–21, 10–21	(silver) Runner-up

BWF International Challenge tournament
BWF International Series tournament
BWF Future Series tournament
