= 2013 African Badminton Championships =

Tournament details
- Dates: 14–20 August 2013
- Venue: National Badminton Centre
- Location: Rose Hill, Mauritius

The 2013 African Badminton Championships or African Badminton Cup of Nations was held in Rose Hill, Mauritius, between 14 and 20 August and organised by the Badminton Confederation of Africa.

== Medalists ==
Event	Gold	Silver	Bronze
Men's singles	(South Africa) Jacob Maliekal	(South Africa) Prakash Vijayanath	(Nigeria) A. Adamu
Men's singles	(South Africa) Jacob Maliekal	(South Africa) Prakash Vijayanath	(Nigeria) Jinkan Ifraimu Bulus
Women's singles	(Nigeria) Grace Gabriel	(Mauritius) Kate Foo Kune	(South Africa) Michelle Butler-Emmett
Women's singles	(Nigeria) Grace Gabriel	(Mauritius) Kate Foo Kune	(Egypt) Hadia Hosny
Men's doubles	(South Africa) Andries Malan and Willem Viljoen	(Nigeria) Enejoh Abah and Victor Makanju	(Algeria) Mohamed Abderrahime Belarbi and Adel Hamek
Men's doubles	(South Africa) Andries Malan and Willem Viljoen	(Nigeria) Enejoh Abah and Victor Makanju	(Mauritius) Aatish Lubah and Julien Paul
Women's doubles	(Seychelles) Juliette Ah-Wan and Allisen Camille	(Mauritius) Shama Aboobakar and Yeldy Louison	(South Africa) Michelle Butler-Emmett and Jennifer Fry
Women's doubles	(Seychelles) Juliette Ah-Wan and Allisen Camille	(Mauritius) Shama Aboobakar and Yeldy Louison	(South Africa) Elme de Villiers and Sandra Le Grange
Mixed doubles	(South Africa) Willem Viljoen and Michelle Butler-Emmett	(South Africa) Andries Malan and Jennifer Fry	(Mauritius) Denneshsing Baboolall and Shama Aboobakar
Mixed doubles	(South Africa) Willem Viljoen and Michelle Butler-Emmett	(South Africa) Andries Malan and Jennifer Fry	(Mauritius) Sahir Edoo and Yeldie Louison
Teams	South Africa; Edwards Ian, Andries Malan, Jacob Maliekal, Jamie McManus, Prakash Vijayanath, Willem Viljoen; Elme de Villiers, Michelle Butler-Emmett, Jennifer Fry, Sandra Le Grange	Nigeria; A. Adamu, Enejoh Abah, Jinkan Ifraimu Bulus, Ola Fagbemi, Victor Makanju, Kayode Olatunji; Dorcas Ajoke Adesokan, Tosin Damilola Atolagbe, Fatima Azeez, Grace Gabriel	Mauritius; Deeneshing Baboolall, Julien Paul, Aatish Lubah, Sahir Edoo; Shama Aboobakar, Kate Foo Kune, Yeldie Louison
Teams	South Africa; Edwards Ian, Andries Malan, Jacob Maliekal, Jamie McManus, Prakash Vijayanath, Willem Viljoen; Elme de Villiers, Michelle Butler-Emmett, Jennifer Fry, Sandra Le Grange	Nigeria; A. Adamu, Enejoh Abah, Jinkan Ifraimu Bulus, Ola Fagbemi, Victor Makanju, Kayode Olatunji; Dorcas Ajoke Adesokan, Tosin Damilola Atolagbe, Fatima Azeez, Grace Gabriel	Seychelles; Georgie Cupidon, Kervin Ghislain, Steve Malcouzane; Juliette Ah-Wan, Alisen Camille, Cynthia Course

=== Medal table ===
* Host nation (Mauritius)

Rank	Nation	Gold	Silver	Bronze	Total
1	South Africa	4	2	3	9
2	Nigeria	1	2	2	5
3	Seychelles	1	0	1	2
4	Mauritius*	0	2	4	6
5	Algeria	0	0	1	1
5	Egypt	0	0	1	1
Totals (6 entries)		6	6	12	24
