= Prakash Vijayanath =

South African badminton player (born 1994)

Personal information
- Born: 7 November 1994 (age 32) Madurai, India
- Height: 1.80 m (5 ft 11 in)
- Weight: 73 kg (161 lb)

Sport
- Country: South Africa
- Sport: Badminton

Men's singles & doubles
- Highest ranking: 137 (MS 26 November 2015); 409 (MD 15 June 2017); 243 (XD 17 May 2012)
- BWF profile
Medal record
Men's badminton
Representing South Africa
All-Africa Games
Silver medal – second place	2015 Brazzaville	Men's singles
Silver medal – second place	2015 Brazzaville	Mixed team
African Championships
Gold medal – first place	2013 Rose Hill	Mixed team
Silver medal – second place	2013 Rose Hill	Men's singles
Africa Team Championships
Gold medal – first place	2016 Rose Hill	Men's team

Prakash Vijayanath (born 7 November 1994) is a South African badminton player.

== Career ==
Vijayanath was born in India but moved to South Africa when he was four, and started playing badminton at age six in Johannesburg.

In 2013, he was selected among the 14 best African players to be a member of the Road to Rio Project organised by the BWF and Badminton Confederation of Africa, to provide financial and technical support to African players and the lead-up to the 2016 Olympic Games in Rio de Janeiro. He received a Sport Scholarship, supported by Trinity's Global Relations Office studying Computer Science and Business in Trinity College, Dublin. Alongside his studies, he trained at the Badminton Ireland Academy with the Irish high performance squad based at Marino under the guidance of coach Daniel Magee. In August 2013, he won the mixed team gold medal and the men's singles silver medal at the African Badminton Championships. In December 2013, he was the semi-finalist at the South Africa International tournament.

In 2014, he was selected to represent South Africa badminton at the Commonwealth Games in Glasgow, Scotland. He became the runner-up of South Africa International in mixed doubles event with his partner Stacey Doubell and the semi-finalist of Zambia International tournament in men's singles event.

In 2015, he was nominated for the Badminton World Federation (BWF) Athletes' Commission, to be a bridge between Africa and the global badminton community. "For the success of the BWF Athletes' Commission it is essential to have global representation. African badminton has come a long way and to keep this momentum going it is important to have the support from the global community" he said. In February, he became the semi-finalist of Uganda International, and in August–September, he won silver medals in men's singles and mixed team events at the African Games.

In 2018, he made his second appearance at the Commonwealth Games in Gold Coast.

== Achievements ==
=== All-Africa Games ===
Men's singles
Year	Venue	Opponent	Score	Result
2015	Gymnase Étienne Mongha, Brazzaville, Republic of the Congo	(South Africa) Jacob Maliekal	17–21, 17–21	Silver

=== African Championships ===
Men's singles
Year	Venue	Opponent	Score	Result
2013	National Badminton Centre, Rose Hill, Mauritius	(South Africa) Jacob Maliekal	13–21, 12–21	Silver

=== BWF International Challenge/Series ===
Men's doubles
Year	Tournament	Partner	Opponent	Score	Result
2016	South Africa International	(South Africa) Matthew Michel	(Egypt) Abdelrahman Abdelhakim (Egypt) Ahmed Salah	16–21, 20–22	(silver) Runner-up

Mixed Doubles
Year	Tournament	Partner	Opponent	Score	Result
2014	South Africa International	(South Africa) Stacey Doubell	(South Africa) Cameron Coetzer (South Africa) Michelle Butler-Emmett	23–25, 21–19, 15–21	(gold) Winner

BWF International Challenge tournament
BWF International Series tournament
BWF Future Series tournament
