= 2014 African Badminton Championships =

Tournament details
- Dates: 27–29 April 2014
- Venue: Lobatse Stadium
- Location: Gaborone, Botswana

The 2014 African Badminton Championships were held in Gaborone, Botswana between 27–29 April and organised by the Badminton Confederation of Africa.

== Medalists ==
Event	Gold	Silver	Bronze
Men's singles	(South Africa) Jacob Maliekal	(Nigeria) Joseph Abah Eneojo	(Nigeria) Victor Makanju
Men's singles	(South Africa) Jacob Maliekal	(Nigeria) Joseph Abah Eneojo	(Botswana) Gaone Tawana
Women's singles	(Mauritius) Kate Foo Kune	(Nigeria) Grace Gabriel	(Nigeria) Dorcas Ajoke Adesokan
Women's singles	(Mauritius) Kate Foo Kune	(Nigeria) Grace Gabriel	(South Africa) Sandra Le Grange
Men's doubles	(South Africa) Andries Malan and Willem Viljoen	(Nigeria) Joseph Abah Eneojo and Victor Makanju	(Mauritius) Deeneshing Baboolall and Julien Paul
Men's doubles	(South Africa) Andries Malan and Willem Viljoen	(Nigeria) Joseph Abah Eneojo and Victor Makanju	(Seychelles) Georgie Cupidon and Steve Malcouzane
Women's doubles	(Mauritius) Kate Foo Kune and Yeldy Louison	(Seychelles) Juliette Ah-Wan and Alisen Camille	(Nigeria) Tosin Damilola Atolagbe and Fatima Azeez
Women's doubles	(Mauritius) Kate Foo Kune and Yeldy Louison	(Seychelles) Juliette Ah-Wan and Alisen Camille	(South Africa) Elme de Villiers and Jennifer Fry
Mixed doubles	(South Africa) Willem Viljoen and Michelle Butler Emmett	(South Africa) Andries Malan and Jennifer Fry	(Nigeria) Joseph Abah Eneojo and Tosin Damilola Atolagbe
Mixed doubles	(South Africa) Willem Viljoen and Michelle Butler Emmett	(South Africa) Andries Malan and Jennifer Fry	(Nigeria) Olaoluwa Fagbemi and Dorcas Ajoke Adesokan
Teams	South Africa; Michael Jennings, James Macmanus, Andries Malan, Jacob Maliekal, Willem Viljoen; Elme de Villiers, Michelle Butler Emmett, Jennifer Fry, Sandra Le Grange	Nigeria; Joseph Abah Eneojo, Olaluwa Fagbemi, Victor Makanju; Dorcas Ajoke Adesokan, Tosin Damilola Atolagbe, Fatima Azeez, Grace Gabriel	Mauritius; Deeneshing Baboolall, Julien Paul, Shaheer Ramrakha; Aurelie Allet, Kate Foo Kune, Yeldy Louison
Teams	South Africa; Michael Jennings, James Macmanus, Andries Malan, Jacob Maliekal, Willem Viljoen; Elme de Villiers, Michelle Butler Emmett, Jennifer Fry, Sandra Le Grange	Nigeria; Joseph Abah Eneojo, Olaluwa Fagbemi, Victor Makanju; Dorcas Ajoke Adesokan, Tosin Damilola Atolagbe, Fatima Azeez, Grace Gabriel	Seychelles; Georgie Cupidon, Kervin Ghislain, Steve Malcouzane; Juliette Ah-Wan, Chlorie Cadeau, Alisen Camille, Danielle Jupiter

=== Medal table ===
* Host nation (Botswana)

Rank	Nation	Gold	Silver	Bronze	Total
1	South Africa	4	1	2	7
2	Mauritius	2	0	2	4
3	Nigeria	0	4	5	9
4	Seychelles	0	1	2	3
5	Botswana*	0	0	1	1
Totals (5 entries)		6	6	12	24
