= Ali Ahmed El-Khateeb =

Egyptian badminton player (born 1990)

Personal information
- Born: 10 October 1990 (age 36)

Sport
- Country: Egypt
- Sport: Badminton

Men's singles & doubles
- Highest ranking: 146 (MS 26 November 2015); 47 (MD 15 September 2016); 83 (XD 26 November 2015)
- BWF profile
Medal record
Men's badminton
Representing Egypt
African Games
Silver medal – second place	2015 Brazzaville	Men's doubles
African Badminton Championships
Gold medal – first place	2017 Benoni	Mixed team
Bronze medal – third place	2011 Marrakesh	Men's doubles
Bronze medal – third place	2011 Marrakesh	Mixed team
Bronze medal – third place	2017 Benoni	Men's singles
Bronze medal – third place	2017 Benoni	Men's doubles
Africa Team Championships
Bronze medal – third place	2010 Kampala	Men's team
Bronze medal – third place	2012 Addis Ababa	Men's team

Ali Ahmed El-Khateeb (born 10 October 1990) is an Egyptian badminton player.

== Achievements ==
=== All African Games ===
Men's doubles
Year	Venue	Partner	Opponent	Score	Result
2015	Gymnase Étienne Mongha; Brazzaville, Republic of the Congo	(Egypt) Abdelrahman Kashkal	(South Africa) Andries Malan (South Africa) Willem Viljoen	10–21, 13–21	Silver

=== African Championships ===
Men's singles
Year	Venue	Opponent	Score	Result
2017	John Barrable Hall, Benoni, South Africa	(Egypt) Ahmed Salah	17–21, 15–21	Bronze

Men's doubles
Year	Venue	Partner	Opponent	Score	Result
2011	Salle Couverte Zerktouni; Marrakesh, Morocco	(Egypt) Abdelrahman Kashkal	(Nigeria) Jinkan Ifraimu (Nigeria) Ola Fagbemi	9–21, 19–21	Bronze
2017	John Barrable Hall; Benoni, South Africa	(Egypt) Adham Hatem Elgamal	(Algeria) Koceila Mammeri (Algeria) Youcef Sabri Medel	21–18, 14–21, 15–21	Bronze

=== BWF International Challenge/Series (8 runners-up) ===
Men's singles
Year	Tournament	Opponent	Score	Result
2015	Uganda International	(South Africa) Jacob Maliekal	8–11, 10–11, 2–11	(silver) Runner-up

Men's doubles
Year	Tournament	Partner	Opponent	Score	Result
2015	Nigeria International	(Egypt) Abdelrahman Kashkal	(Turkey) Emre Vural (Turkey) Sinan Zorlu	14–21, 19–21	(silver) Runner-up
2015	Zambia International	(Egypt) Abdelrahman Kashkal	(South Africa) Andries Malan (South Africa) Willem Viljoen	14–21, 15–21	(silver) Runner-up
2016	Uganda International	(Egypt) Abdelrahman Kashkal	(Sri Lanka) Dinuka Karunaratna (Sri Lanka) Niluka Karunaratne	17–21, 17–21	(silver) Runner-up
2016	Egypt International	(Egypt) Abdelrahman Kashkal	(France) Vanmael Hériau (France) Florent Riancho	3–21, 9–21	(silver) Runner-up
2018	Egypt International	(Malaysia) Yogendran Krishnan	(Azerbaijan) Ade Resky Dwicahyo (Azerbaijan) Azmy Qowimuramadhoni	21–18, 16–21, 18–21	(silver) Runner-up

Mixed doubles
Year	Tournament	Partner	Opponent	Score	Result
2014	Zambia International	(Egypt) Doha Hany	(Mauritius) Julien Paul (Mauritius) Kate Foo Kune	18–21, 14–21	(silver) Runner-up
2015	Ethiopia International	(Egypt) Doha Hany	(Egypt) Ahmed Salah (Egypt) Menna Eltanany	15–21, 16–21	(silver) Runner-up

BWF International Challenge tournament
BWF International Series tournament
BWF Future Series tournament
