= Badminton at the 2011 All-Africa Games =

- Venue: Escola Josina Machel
- Dates: 6 – 12 September
- Nations: 13

Badminton at the 2011 All-Africa Games in Maputo, Mozambique was held between September 6–12, 2011.

== Venue ==
This competition was held at the Escola Josina Machel, in Maputo, Mozambique.

== Medal summary ==
The tables below gives an overview of the medal table and medal result at the 2011 All-Africa Games.

=== Medal table ===
Rank	Nation	Gold	Silver	Bronze	Total
1	South Africa	3	2	2	7
2	Nigeria	3	1	5	9
3	Seychelles	0	2	2	4
4	Uganda	0	1	0	1
5	Mauritius	0	0	2	2
6	Ghana	0	0	1	1
Totals (6 entries)		6	6	12	24

=== Results ===
Event	Gold	Silver	Bronze
Men's singles	Jacob Maliekal; South Africa	Edwin Ekiring; Uganda	Jinkan Ifraimu; Nigeria
Men's singles	Jacob Maliekal; South Africa	Edwin Ekiring; Uganda	Ola Fagbemi; Nigeria
Women's singles	Susan Ideh; Nigeria	Gabriel Ofodile; Nigeria	Stacey Doubell; South Africa
Women's singles	Susan Ideh; Nigeria	Gabriel Ofodile; Nigeria	Maria Braimoh; Nigeria
Men's doubles	Nigeria; Jinkan Ifraimu; Ola Fagbemi	South Africa; Dorian James; Willem Viljoen	Ghana; Solomon Mensah Nyarko; Daniel Sam
Men's doubles	Nigeria; Jinkan Ifraimu; Ola Fagbemi	South Africa; Dorian James; Willem Viljoen	Seychelles; Georgie Cupidon; Steve Malcouzanne
Women's doubles	South Africa; Annari Viljoen; Stacey Doubell	Seychelles; Camille Allisen; Cynthia Course	Mauritius; Priscilla Pillay Vinayagam; Karen Foo Kune
Women's doubles	South Africa; Annari Viljoen; Stacey Doubell	Seychelles; Camille Allisen; Cynthia Course	Nigeria; Titilayo Fatima Azeez; Grace Daniel
Mixed doubles	South Africa; Willem Viljoen; Annari Viljoen	Seychelles; Georgie Cupidon; Camille Allisen	South Africa; Enrico James; Stacey Doubell
Mixed doubles	South Africa; Willem Viljoen; Annari Viljoen	Seychelles; Georgie Cupidon; Camille Allisen	Nigeria; Ibrahim Adamu; Grace Daniel
Mixed team	Nigeria; Enejoh Abah; Ibrahim Adamu; Olorunfemi Elewa; Ola Fagbemi; Jinkan Ifraimu; Victor Makanju; Tosin Damilola Atolagbe; Titilayo Fatima Azeez; Maria Braimoh; Grace Daniel; Grace Gabriel; Susan Ideh	South Africa; Roelof Dednam; Dorian James; Enrico James; Jacob Maliekal; Willem Viljoen; Stacey Doubell; Michelle Butler-Emmett; Kerry-Lee Harrington; Annari Viljoen	Mauritius; Deeneshing Baboolall; Yoni Louison; Christopher Paul; Neeresh Ramtohul; Karen Foo Kune; Priscilla Vinayagum Pillay
Mixed team	Nigeria; Enejoh Abah; Ibrahim Adamu; Olorunfemi Elewa; Ola Fagbemi; Jinkan Ifraimu; Victor Makanju; Tosin Damilola Atolagbe; Titilayo Fatima Azeez; Maria Braimoh; Grace Daniel; Grace Gabriel; Susan Ideh	South Africa; Roelof Dednam; Dorian James; Enrico James; Jacob Maliekal; Willem Viljoen; Stacey Doubell; Michelle Butler-Emmett; Kerry-Lee Harrington; Annari Viljoen	Seychelles; Georgie Cupidon; Kervin Ghislain; Steve Malcouzanne; Allisen Camille; Cynthia Course; Danielle Jupiter
