= 2012 Thomas & Uber Cups Preliminaries for Africa =

Tournament details
- Dates: 22–26 February 2012
- Edition: 5
- Location: Addis Ababa, Ethiopia

The 2012 Thomas & Uber Cups Preliminaries for Africa were held in Addis Ababa, Ethiopia, between 22 and 26 February and sanctioned by Badminton World Federation and Badminton Confederation of Africa. Nigeria and South Africa was the defending champion in men's and women's team events. This tournament serves as qualification stage for African countries for the 2012 Thomas & Uber Cup.

== Medalists ==
- Men's Team

| Medal | Team | Players |
|---|---|---|
| Gold | South Africa | Christoffel Dednam, Dorian James, Enrico James, Jacob Maliekal, Willem Viljoen |
| Silver | Nigeria | Eneojo Joseph Abah, Jinkan Ifraimu Bulus, Olaoluwa Ebenezar Fagbemi, Victor Makanju |
| Bronze | Egypt | Ali Ahmed El Khateeb, Mahmoud Elsayaad, Shadeed Karrem, Abdelrahman Kashkal |
| Bronze | Mauritius | Deeneshing Baboolall, Stephan Beehary, Yoni Louison, Christopher Paul |

- Women's Team

| Medal | Team | Players |
|---|---|---|
| Gold | South Africa | Michelle Butler-Emmett, Stacey Doubell, Michelle Edwards, Kerry-Lee Harrington, Annari Viljoen |
| Silver | Nigeria | Tosin Atolagbe, Fatima Azeeze, Grace Daniel, Susan Ideh, Grace Gabriel |
| Bronze | Egypt | Nadine Ashraf, Menna Eltanany, Hadia Hosny, Dina Nagy |
| Bronze | Mauritius | Shama Aboobakar, Karen Foo Kune, Kate Foo Kune, Priscilla Vinayagam Pillay |

== Men's team ==
=== Group stage ===
==== Group A ====
| Pos | Team | Pld | W | L | MF | MA | MD | GF | GA | GD | PF | PA | PD | Pts | Qualification |
|---|---|---|---|---|---|---|---|---|---|---|---|---|---|---|---|
| 1 | South Africa | 3 | 3 | 0 | 13 | 2 | +11 | 24 | 4 | +20 | 574 | 346 | +228 | 3 | Knockout stage |
| 2 | Egypt | 3 | 2 | 1 | 12 | 3 | +9 | 24 | 6 | +18 | 587 | 424 | +163 | 2 | Knockout stage |
| 3 | Ethiopia (H) | 3 | 1 | 2 | 3 | 12 | −9 | 6 | 21 | −15 | 395 | 522 | −127 | 1 | |
| 4 | Kenya | 3 | 0 | 3 | 2 | 13 | −11 | 3 | 26 | −23 | 336 | 600 | −264 | 0 | |

Source: BWF
(H) Host
- Kenya vs South Africa

Kenya
0
Arat Kilo Hall, Court 1
22 February 2012, 08:30 UTC+3

South Africa
5

| | | | 1 | 2 | 3 |
|---|---|---|---|---|---|
| 1 | (Kenya) (South Africa) | Mistri Dawn; Jacob Maliekal | 8; 21 | 9; 21 |
| 2 | (Kenya) (South Africa) | Mit Patel; Willem Viljoen | 16; 21 | 5; 21 |
| 3 | (Kenya) (South Africa) | Shyam Raval; Enrico James | 8; 21 | 14; 21 |
| 4 | (Kenya) (South Africa) | Mistri Dawn / Mit Patel; Dorian James / Willem Viljoen | 12; 21 | 9; 21 |
| 5 | (Kenya) (South Africa) | Harsh Patel / Shyam Raval; Chris Dednam / Enrico James | 7; 21 | 5; 21 |

- Egypt vs Ethiopia

Egypt
5
Arat Kilo Hall, Court 2
22 February 2012, 08:30 UTC+3

Ethiopia
0

| | | | 1 | 2 | 3 |
|---|---|---|---|---|---|
| 1 | (Egypt) (Ethiopia) | Abdelrahman Kashkal; Asnake Getachew Sahilu | 21; 8 | 21; 11 |
| 2 | (Egypt) (Ethiopia) | Mahmoud El-Sayad; Ermiyas Tamrat Degefe | 21; 14 | 21; 18 |
| 3 | (Egypt) (Ethiopia) | Ali Ahmed El-Khateeb; Teera Reta | 21; 14 | 21; 17 |
| 4 | (Egypt) (Ethiopia) | Ali Ahmed El-Khateeb / Abdelrahman Kashkal; Asnake Getachew Sahilu / Ermiyas Tamrat Degefe | 21; 13 | 21; 17 |
| 5 | (Egypt) (Ethiopia) | Mahmoud El-Sayad / Kareem Shedeed; Teera Reta / Mekonen Gebrelu | 21; 10 | 21; 7 |

- Egypt vs Kenya

Egypt
5
Arat Kilo Hall, Court 1
23 February 2012, 08:30 UTC+3

Kenya
0

| | | | 1 | 2 | 3 |
|---|---|---|---|---|---|
| 1 | (Egypt) (Kenya) | Mahmoud El-Sayad; Mistri Dawn | 21; 19 | 21; 1 |
| 2 | (Egypt) (Kenya) | Ali Ahmed El-Khateeb; Mit Patel | 21; 14 | 21; 6 |
| 3 | (Egypt) (Kenya) | Kareem Shedeed; Harsh Patel | 21; 10 | 21; 9 |
| 4 | (Egypt) (Kenya) | Abdelrahman Kashkal / Ali Ahmed El Khateeb; Mistri Dawn / Mit Patel | 21; 12 | 21; 9 |
| 5 | (Egypt) (Kenya) | Mahmoud El-Sayad / Kareem Shedeed; Harsh Patel / Shyam Raval | 21; 13 | 21; 6 |

- Ethiopia vs South Africa

Ethiopia
0
Arat Kilo Hall, Court 3
23 February 2012, 08:30 UTC+3

South Africa
5

| | | | 1 | 2 | 3 |
|---|---|---|---|---|---|---|
| 1 | (Ethiopia) (South Africa) | Asnake Getachew Sahilu; Jacob Maliekal | 10; 21 | 12; 21 |
| 2 | (Ethiopia) (South Africa) | Ermiyas Tamrat Degefe; Willem Viljoen | 14; 21 | 13; 21 |
| 3 | (Ethiopia) (South Africa) | Teera Reta; Enrico James | 11; 21 | 7; 21 |
| 4 | (Ethiopia) (South Africa) | Ermiyas Tamrat Degefe / Asnake Getachew Sahilu; Dorian James / Willem Viljoen | | | | w/o |
| 5 | (Ethiopia) (South Africa) | Teera Reta / Mekonen Gebrelu; Chris Dednam / Enrico James | 8; 21 | 11; 21 |

- Egypt vs South Africa

Egypt
2
Arat Kilo Hall, Court 3
23 February 2012, 14:00 UTC+3

South Africa
3

| | | | 1 | 2 | 3 |
|---|---|---|---|---|---|
| 1 | (Egypt) (South Africa) | Abdelrahman Kashkal; Jacob Maliekal | 18; 21 | 11; 21 |
| 2 | (Egypt) (South Africa) | Mahmoud El-Sayad; Willem Viljoen | 12; 21 | 19; 21 |
| 3 | (Egypt) (South Africa) | Ali Ahmed El-Khateeb; Enrico James | 21; 18 | 21; 16 |
| 4 | (Egypt) (South Africa) | Ali Ahmed El-Khateeb / Abdelrahman Kashkal; Dorian James / Willem Viljoen | 9; 21 | 14; 21 |
| 5 | (Egypt) (South Africa) | Mahmoud El-Sayad / Kareem Shedeed; Chris Dednam / Enrico James | 21; 18 | 21; 18 |

- Ethiopia vs Kenya

Ethiopia
3
Arat Kilo Hall, Court 4
23 February 2012, 14:00 UTC+3

Kenya
2

| | | | 1 | 2 | 3 |
|---|---|---|---|---|---|---|
| 1 | (Ethiopia) (Kenya) | Asnake Getachew Sahilu; Mistri Dawn | 19; 21 | 13; 21 |
| 2 | (Ethiopia) (Kenya) | Ermiyas Tamrat Degefe; Mit Patel | 19; 21 | 21; 17 | 24; 22 |
| 3 | (Ethiopia) (Kenya) | Teera Reta; Shyam Raval | 21; 6 | 21; 10 |
| 4 | (Ethiopia) (Kenya) | Ermiyas Tamrat Degefe / Asnake Getachew Sahilu; Mistri Dawn / Mit Patel | | | | w/o |
| 5 | (Ethiopia) (Kenya) | Mekonen Gebrelu / Teera Reta; Harsh Patel / Shyam Raval | 21; 14 | 21; 12 |

==== Group B ====
| Pos | Team | Pld | W | L | MF | MA | MD | GF | GA | GD | PF | PA | PD | Pts | Qualification |
|---|---|---|---|---|---|---|---|---|---|---|---|---|---|---|---|
| 1 | Nigeria | 2 | 2 | 0 | 9 | 1 | +8 | 18 | 4 | +14 | 453 | 335 | +118 | 2 | Knockout stage |
| 2 | Mauritius | 2 | 1 | 1 | 5 | 5 | 0 | 8 | 12 | −4 | 351 | 383 | −32 | 1 | Knockout stage |
| 3 | Uganda | 2 | 0 | 2 | 1 | 9 | −8 | 4 | 14 | −10 | 287 | 373 | −86 | 0 | |

Source: BWF
- Nigeria vs Uganda

Nigeria
4
Arat Kilo Hall, Court 2
23 February 2012, 08:30 UTC+3

Uganda
1

| | | | 1 | 2 | 3 |
|---|---|---|---|---|---|
| 1 | (Nigeria) (Uganda) | Jinkan Ifraimu; Edwin Ekiring | 21; 16 | 21; 13 |
| 2 | (Nigeria) (Uganda) | Ola Fagbemi; Wilson Tukire | 18; 21 | 19; 21 |
| 3 | (Nigeria) (Uganda) | Enejoh Abah; Brian Ssunna | 21; 4 | 21; 18 |
| 4 | (Nigeria) (Uganda) | Ola Fagbemi / Jinkan Ifraimu; Edwin Ekiring / Wilson Tukire | 21; 15 | 21; 19 |
| 5 | (Nigeria) (Uganda) | Enejoh Abah / Victor Makanju; Daniel Mihigo / Brian Ssunna | 21; 13 | 21; 12 |

- Mauritius vs Nigeria

Mauritius
0
Arat Kilo Hall, Court 1
24 February 2012, 08:30 UTC+3

Nigeria
5

| | | | 1 | 2 | 3 |
|---|---|---|---|---|---|
| 1 | (Mauritius) (Nigeria) | Denneshsing Baboolall; Jinkan Ifraimu | 15; 21 | 20; 22 |
| 2 | (Mauritius) (Nigeria) | Yoni Louison; Ola Fagbemi | 12; 21 | 21; 18 | 13; 21 |
| 3 | (Mauritius) (Nigeria) | Christopher Paul; Enejoh Abah | 13; 21 | 11; 21 |
| 4 | (Mauritius) (Nigeria) | Denneshsing Baboolall / Yoni Louison; Ola Fagbemi / Jinkan Ifraimu | 16; 21 | 21; 19 | 19; 21 |
| 5 | (Mauritius) (Nigeria) | Stephan Beeharry / Christopher Paul; Enejoh Abah / Victor Makanju | 11; 21 | 11; 21 |

- Mauritius vs Uganda

Mauritius
5
Arat Kilo Hall, Court 1
24 February 2012, 14:00 UTC+3

Uganda
0

| | | | 1 | 2 | 3 |
|---|---|---|---|---|---|---|
| 1 | (Mauritius) (Uganda) | Denneshsing Baboolall; Wilson Tukire | 19; 21 | 21; 13 | 21; 16 |
| 2 | (Mauritius) (Uganda) | Yoni Louison; Brian Ssunna | 27; 25 | 17; 21 | 21; 13 |
| 3 | (Mauritius) (Uganda) | Christopher Paul; Daniel Mihigo | 21; 16 | 21; 10 |
| 4 | (Mauritius) (Uganda) | Denneshsing Baboolall / Yoni Louison; Edwin Ekiring / Wilson Tukire | | | | w/o |
| 5 | (Mauritius) (Uganda) | Stephan Beeharry / Christopher Paul; Daniel Mihigo / Brian Ssunna | | | | w/o |

=== Knockout stage ===
==== Bracket ====
Semi-finals
25 February
South Africa | 3
Mauritius | 0
25 February
Egypt | 0
Nigeria | 3

Final
26 February
South Africa | 3
Nigeria | 1

==== Semi-finals ====
- South Africa vs Mauritius

South Africa
3
Arat Kilo Hall, Court 3
25 February 2012, 09:00 UTC+3

Mauritius
0

| | | | 1 | 2 | 3 |
|---|---|---|---|---|---|---|
| 1 | (South Africa) (Mauritius) | Jacob Maliekal; Denneshsing Baboolall | 21; 7 | 21; 12 |
| 2 | (South Africa) (Mauritius) | Willem Viljoen; Yoni Louison | 21; 19 | 21; 14 |
| 3 | (South Africa) (Mauritius) | Enrico James; Christopher Paul | 21; 19 | 21; 19 |
| 4 | (South Africa) (Mauritius) | Dorian James / Willem Viljoen; Denneshsing Baboolall / Yoni Louison | | | | not played |
| 5 | (South Africa) (Mauritius) | Chris Dednam / Enrico James; Stephan Beeharry / Christopher Paul | | | | not played |

- Nigeria vs Egypt

Nigeria
3
Arat Kilo Hall, Court 3
25 February 2012, 09:00 UTC+3

Egypt
0

| | | | 1 | 2 | 3 |
|---|---|---|---|---|---|---|
| 1 | (Nigeria) (Egypt) | Jinkan Ifraimu; Abdelrahman Kashkal | 21; 19 | 21; 13 |
| 2 | (Nigeria) (Egypt) | Ola Fagbemi; Mahmoud El-Sayad | 21; 16 | 21; 11 |
| 3 | (Nigeria) (Egypt) | Enejoh Abah; Ali Ahmed El-Khateeb | 21; 13 | 21; 13 |
| 4 | (Nigeria) (Egypt) | Ola Fagbemi / Jinkan Ifraimu; Ali Ahmed El-Khateeb / Abdelrahman Kashkal | | | | not played |
| 5 | (Nigeria) (Egypt) | Enejoh Abah / Victor Makanju; Mahmoud El-Sayad / Kareem Shedeed | | | | not played |

==== Final ====
- South Africa vs Nigeria

South Africa
3
Arat Kilo Hall, Court 3
26 February 2012, 15:00 UTC+3

Nigeria
1

| | | | 1 | 2 | 3 |
|---|---|---|---|---|---|---|
| 1 | (South Africa) (Nigeria) | Jacob Maliekal; Jinkan Ifraimu | 24; 22 | 21; 19 |
| 2 | (South Africa) (Nigeria) | Willem Viljoen; Victor Makanju | | | | w/o |
| 3 | (South Africa) (Nigeria) | Enrico James; Enejoh Abah | 3; 21 | 17; 21 |
| 4 | (South Africa) (Nigeria) | Dorian James / Willem Viljoen; Jinkan Ifraimu / Ola Fagbemi | 21; 9 | 17; 21 | 23; 21 |
| 5 | (South Africa) (Nigeria) | Chris Dednam / Enrico James; Enejoh Abah / Victor Makanju | | | | not played |

== Women's team ==
=== Group stage ===
==== Group A ====
| Pos | Team | Pld | W | L | MF | MA | MD | GF | GA | GD | PF | PA | PD | Pts | Qualification |
|---|---|---|---|---|---|---|---|---|---|---|---|---|---|---|---|
| 1 | South Africa | 3 | 3 | 0 | 15 | 0 | +15 | 20 | 2 | +18 | 457 | 289 | +168 | 3 | Knockout stage |
| 2 | Mauritius | 3 | 2 | 1 | 10 | 5 | +5 | 15 | 11 | +4 | 470 | 406 | +64 | 2 | Knockout stage |
| 3 | Uganda | 3 | 1 | 2 | 5 | 10 | −5 | 2 | 20 | −18 | 272 | 451 | −179 | 1 | |
| 4 | Ethiopia (H) | 3 | 0 | 3 | 0 | 15 | −15 | 0 | 4 | −4 | 31 | 84 | −53 | 0 | |

Source: BWF
(H) Host
- South Africa vs Uganda

South Africa
5
Arat Kilo Hall, Court 3
23 February 2012, 08:30 UTC+3

Uganda
0

| | | | 1 | 2 | 3 |
|---|---|---|---|---|---|
| 1 | (South Africa) (Uganda) | Kerry-Lee Harrington; Bridget Shamim Bangi | 21; 5 | 21; 6 |
| 2 | (South Africa) (Uganda) | Stacey Doubell; Margaret Nankabirwa | 21; 10 | 21; 15 |
| 3 | (South Africa) (Uganda) | Michelle Butler-Emmett; Daisy Nakalyango | 21; 13 | 18; 21 | 21; 8 |
| 4 | (South Africa) (Uganda) | Michelle Claire Edwards / Annari Viljoen; Bridget Shamim Bangi / Margaret Nankabirwa | 21; 14 | 21; 11 |
| 5 | (South Africa) (Uganda) | Michelle Butler-Emmett / Stacey Doubell; Rose Nakalya / Daisy Nakalyango | 21; 12 | 21; 11 |

- Mauritius vs Ethiopia

Mauritius
5
Arat Kilo Hall, Court 2
23 February 2012, 14:00 UTC+3

Ethiopia
0

| | | | 1 | 2 | 3 |
|---|---|---|---|---|---|---|
| 1 | (Mauritius) (Ethiopia) | Karen Foo Kune; Yerusksew Legssey Tura | 21; 3 | 21; 7 |
| 2 | (Mauritius) (Ethiopia) | Kate Foo Kune; Mistre Manyazewal Girma | 21; 11 | 21; 10 |
| 3 | (Mauritius) (Ethiopia) | Shama Aboobakar; Firehiwot Getachew | | | | w/o |
| 4 | (Mauritius) (Ethiopia) | Karen Foo Kune / Kate Foo Kune; Mistre Manyazewal Girma / Yerusksew Legssey Tura | | | | w/o |
| 5 | (Mauritius) (Ethiopia) | Shama Aboobakar / Priscilla Pillay-Vinayagam; Mistre Manyazewal Girma / Ayelech Yakob | | | | w/o |

- Mauritius vs Uganda

Mauritius
5
Arat Kilo Hall, Court 4
23 February 2012, 18:30 UTC+3

Uganda
0

| | | | 1 | 2 | 3 |
|---|---|---|---|---|---|
| 1 | (Mauritius) (Uganda) | Karen Foo Kune; Bridget Shamim Bangi | 21; 14 | 13; 21 | 21; 11 |
| 2 | (Mauritius) (Uganda) | Kate Foo Kune; Margaret Nankabirwa | 21; 8 | 21; 18 |
| 3 | (Mauritius) (Uganda) | Shama Aboobakar; Daisy Nakalyango | 21; 12 | 21; 16 |
| 4 | (Mauritius) (Uganda) | Karen Foo Kune / Kate Foo Kune; Bridget Shamim Bangi / Margaret Nankabirwa | 21; 12 | 21; 11 |
| 5 | (Mauritius) (Uganda) | Shama Aboobakar / Priscilla Pillay-Vinayagam; Rose Nakalya / Daisy Nakalyango | 21; 10 | 21; 13 |

- South Africa vs Ethiopia

South Africa
5
Arat Kilo Hall, Court 2
24 February 2012, 14:00 UTC+3

Ethiopia
0

| | | | 1 | 2 | 3 |
|---|---|---|---|---|---|---|
| 1 | (South Africa) (Ethiopia) | Kerry-Lee Harrington; Yerusksew Legssey Tura | | | | w/o |
| 2 | (South Africa) (Ethiopia) | Stacey Doubell; Mistre Manyazewal Girma | | | | w/o |
| 3 | (South Africa) (Ethiopia) | Michelle Butler-Emmett; Firehiwot Getachew | | | | w/o |
| 4 | (South Africa) (Ethiopia) | Michelle Claire Edwards / Annari Viljoen; Mistre Manyazewal Girma / Yerusksew Legssey Tura | | | | w/o |
| 5 | (South Africa) (Ethiopia) | Michelle Butler-Emmett / Stacey Doubell; Mistre Manyazewal Girma / Ayelech Yakob | | | | w/o |

- South Africa vs Mauritius

South Africa
5
Arat Kilo Hall, Court 2
24 February 2012, 14:00 UTC+3

Mauritius
0

| | | | 1 | 2 | 3 |
|---|---|---|---|---|---|
| 1 | (South Africa) (Mauritius) | Kerry-Lee Harrington; Karen Foo Kune | 21; 16 | 21; 17 |
| 2 | (South Africa) (Mauritius) | Stacey Doubell; Kate Foo Kune | 21; 15 | 23; 21 |
| 3 | (South Africa) (Mauritius) | Annari Viljoen; Shama Aboobakar | 21; 15 | 15; 21 | 21; 9 |
| 4 | (South Africa) (Mauritius) | Michelle Claire Edwards / Annari Viljoen; Kate Foo Kune / Shama Aboobakar | 21; 5 | 21; 12 |
| 5 | (South Africa) (Mauritius) | Michelle Butler-Emmett / Stacey Doubell; Karen Foo Kune / Priscilla Pillay-Vinayagam | 21; 11 | 23; 21 |

- Ethiopia vs Uganda

Ethiopia
0
Arat Kilo Hall, Court 4
24 February 2012, 18:30 UTC+3

Uganda
5

| | | | 1 | 2 | 3 |
|---|---|---|---|---|---|---|
| 1 | (Ethiopia) (Uganda) | Yerusksew Legssey Tura; Bridget Shamim Bangi | | | | w/o |
| 2 | (Ethiopia) (Uganda) | Mistre Manyazewal Girma; Margaret Nankabirwa | | | | w/o |
| 3 | (Ethiopia) (Uganda) | Firehiwot Getachew; Daisy Nakalyango | | | | w/o |
| 4 | (Ethiopia) (Uganda) | Mistre Manyazewal Girma / Yerusksew Legssey Tura; Bridget Shamim Bangi / Margaret Nankabirwa | | | | w/o |
| 5 | (Ethiopia) (Uganda) | Mistre Manyazewal Girma / Ayelech Yakob; Rose Nakalya / Daisy Nakalyango | | | | w/o |

==== Group B ====
| Pos | Team | Pld | W | L | MF | MA | MD | GF | GA | GD | PF | PA | PD | Pts | Qualification |
|---|---|---|---|---|---|---|---|---|---|---|---|---|---|---|---|
| 1 | Nigeria | 2 | 2 | 0 | 10 | 0 | +10 | 20 | 2 | +18 | 454 | 239 | +215 | 2 | Knockout stage |
| 2 | Egypt | 2 | 1 | 1 | 5 | 5 | 0 | 12 | 11 | +1 | 385 | 395 | −10 | 1 | Knockout stage |
| 3 | Morocco | 2 | 0 | 2 | 0 | 10 | −10 | 1 | 20 | −19 | 232 | 437 | −205 | 0 | |

Source: BWF
- Nigeria vs Egypt

Nigeria
5
Arat Kilo Hall, Court 1
23 February 2012, 14:00 UTC+3

Egypt
0

| | | | 1 | 2 | 3 |
|---|---|---|---|---|---|
| 1 | (Nigeria) (Egypt) | Grace Gabriel; Hadia Hosny | 17; 21 | 21; 9 | 21; 16 |
| 2 | (Nigeria) (Egypt) | Susan Ideh; Dina Nagy | 21; 10 | 21; 13 |
| 3 | (Nigeria) (Egypt) | Fatima Azeez; Menna El-Tanany | 21; 5 | 21; 18 |
| 4 | (Nigeria) (Egypt) | Grace Daniel / Susan Ideh; Hadia Hosny / Dina Nagy | 21; 8 | 21; 12 |
| 5 | (Nigeria) (Egypt) | Tosin Damilola Atolagbe / Fatima Azeez; Nadine Ashraf / Menna El-Tanany | 17; 21 | 21; 9 | 21; 16 |

- Nigeria vs Morocco

Nigeria
5
Arat Kilo Hall, Court 4
23 February 2012, 18:30 UTC+3

Morocco
0

| | | | 1 | 2 | 3 |
|---|---|---|---|---|---|
| 1 | (Nigeria) (Morocco) | Grace Gabriel; Sara El Mernissi | 21; 10 | 21; 11 |
| 2 | (Nigeria) (Morocco) | Susan Ideh; Ghita Charouite | 21; 7 | 21; 9 |
| 3 | (Nigeria) (Morocco) | Fatima Azeez; Jinane Bitarie | 21; 8 | 21; 6 |
| 4 | (Nigeria) (Morocco) | Grace Daniel / Susan Ideh; Ghita Charouite / Sara El Mernissi | 21; 6 | 21; 5 |
| 5 | (Nigeria) (Morocco) | Tosin Damilola Atolagbe / Fatima Azeez; Jinane Bitarie / Rajae Rochdy | 21; 7 | 21; 12 |

- Egypt vs Morocco

Egypt
5
Arat Kilo Hall, Court 2
24 February 2012, 14:00 UTC+3

Morocco
0

| | | | 1 | 2 | 3 |
|---|---|---|---|---|---|
| 1 | (Egypt) (Morocco) | Hadia Hosny; Rajae Rochdy | 21; 15 | 21; 17 |
| 2 | (Egypt) (Morocco) | Dina Nagy; Sara El Mernissi | 21; 16 | 21; 14 |
| 3 | (Egypt) (Morocco) | Nadine Ashraf; Jinane Bitarie | 21; 14 | 21; 18 |
| 4 | (Egypt) (Morocco) | Nadine Ashraf / Dina Nagy; Sara El Mernissi / Rajae Rochdy | 17; 21 | 21; 11 | 21; 15 |
| 5 | (Egypt) (Morocco) | Menna El-Tanany / Hadia Hosny; Jinane Bitarie / Ghita Charouite | 21; 7 | 21; 3 |

=== Knockout stage ===
==== Bracket ====
Semi-finals
25 February
South Africa | 3
Egypt | 0
25 February
Mauritius | 2
Nigeria | 3

Final
26 February
South Africa | 3
Nigeria | 1

==== Semi-finals ====
- South Africa vs Egypt

South Africa
3
Arat Kilo Hall, Court 3
25 February 2012, 09:00 UTC+3

Egypt
0

| | | | 1 | 2 | 3 |
|---|---|---|---|---|---|---|
| 1 | (South Africa) (Egypt) | Kerry-Lee Harrington; Hadia Hosny | 21; 12 | 21; 15 |
| 2 | (South Africa) (Egypt) | Stacey Doubell; Dina Nagy | 21; 18 | 21; 11 |
| 3 | (South Africa) (Egypt) | Annari Viljoen; Menna El-Tanany | 21; 9 | 21; 13 |
| 4 | (South Africa) (Egypt) | Michelle Claire Edwards / Annari Viljoen; Hadia Hosny / Dina Nagy | | | | not played |
| 5 | (South Africa) (Egypt) | Michelle Butler-Emmett / Stacey Doubell; Nadine Ashraf / Menna El-Tanany | | | | not played |

- Nigeria vs Mauritius

Nigeria
3
Arat Kilo Hall, Court 3
25 February 2012, 09:00 UTC+3

Mauritius
2

| | | | 1 | 2 | 3 |
|---|---|---|---|---|---|
| 1 | (Nigeria) (Mauritius) | Grace Gabriel; Karen Foo Kune | 21; 15 | 21; 19 |
| 2 | (Nigeria) (Mauritius) | Susan Ideh; Kate Foo Kune | 13; 21 | 20; 22 |
| 3 | (Nigeria) (Mauritius) | Fatima Azeez; Shama Aboobakar | 16; 21 | 21; 18 | 21; 19 |
| 4 | (Nigeria) (Mauritius) | Grace Daniel / Susan Ideh; Kate Foo Kune / Shama Aboobakar | 17; 21 | 12; 21 |
| 5 | (Nigeria) (Mauritius) | Tosin Damilola Atolagbe / Fatima Azeez; Karen Foo Kune / Priscilla Pillay-Vinayagam | 21; 15 | 21; 15 |

==== Final ====
- South Africa vs Nigeria

South Africa
3
Arat Kilo Hall, Court 3
26 February 2012, 15:00 UTC+3

Nigeria
1

| | | | 1 | 2 | 3 |
|---|---|---|---|---|---|---|
| 1 | (South Africa) (Nigeria) | Kerry-Lee Harrington; Grace Gabriel | 21; 10 | 20; 22 | 16; 21 |
| 2 | (South Africa) (Nigeria) | Stacey Doubell; Susan Ideh | 22; 20 | 21; 19 |
| 3 | (South Africa) (Nigeria) | Annari Viljoen; Tosin Damilola Atolagbe | 21; 13 | 23; 21 |
| 4 | (South Africa) (Nigeria) | Michelle Claire Edwards / Annari Viljoen; Grace Daniel / Susan Ideh | 11; 21 | 21; 12 | 21; 9 |
| 5 | (South Africa) (Nigeria) | Stacey Doubell / Michelle Butler-Emmett; Tosin Damilola Atolagbe / Fatima Azeez | | | | not played |
