= Maria Braimoh =

Nigerian badminton player (born 1990)

Personal information
- Born: Maria Hajara Braimoh; 19 January 1990 (age 36)
- Height: 1.65 m (5 ft 5 in)
- Weight: 56 kg (123 lb)

Sport
- Country: Nigeria
- Sport: Badminton

Women's singles & doubles
- Highest ranking: 210 (WS 16 December 2010); 84 (WD 9 December 2010); 267 (XD 1 September 2016)
- BWF profile
Medal record
Women's badminton
Representing Nigeria
All-Africa Games
Gold medal – first place	2007 Algiers	Mixed team
Gold medal – first place	2011 Maputo	Mixed team
Bronze medal – third place	2011 Maputo	Women's singles
Bronze medal – third place	2015 Brazzaville	Women's doubles
Bronze medal – third place	2015 Brazzaville	Mixed team
African Championships
Silver medal – second place	2011 Marrakesh	Women's doubles
Silver medal – second place	2011 Marrakesh	Mixed team
Silver medal – second place	2010 Kampala	Women's doubles
Bronze medal – third place	2010 Kampala	Women's singles
Africa Team Championships
Bronze medal – third place	2010 Kampala	Women's team

Maria Hajara Braimoh (born 19 January 1990) is a Nigerian badminton player. She was part of the national team that won the gold medals at the 2007 and 2011 All-Africa Games. Braimoh competed at the 2010 Commonwealth Games in New Delhi, India.

== Achievements ==
=== All-Africa Games ===
Women's singles
Year	Venue	Opponent	Score	Result
2011	Escola Josina Machel; Maputo, Mozambique	(Nigeria) Susan Ideh	12–21, 21–19, 7–21	Bronze

Women's doubles
Year	Venue	Partner	Opponent	Score	Result
2015	Gymnase Étienne Mongha; Brazzaville, Republic of the Congo	(Nigeria) Grace Gabriel	(Seychelles) Juliette Ah-Wan (Seychelles) Allisen Camille	13–21, 16–21	Bronze

=== African Championships ===
Women's singles
Year	Venue	Opponent	Score	Result
2010	Kampala, Uganda	(South Africa) Stacey Doubell	18–21, 17–21	Bronze

Women's doubles
Year	Venue	Partner	Opponent	Score	Result
2011	Marrakesh, Morocco	(Nigeria) Susan Ideh	(South Africa) Annari Viljoen (South Africa) Michelle Edwards	9–21, 16–21	Silver
2010	Kampala, Uganda	(Nigeria) Susan Ideh	(South Africa) Annari Viljoen (South Africa) Michelle Edwards	6–21, 6–21	Silver

=== BWF International Challenge/Series ===
Women's doubles
Year	Tournament	Partner	Opponent	Score	Result
2015	Nigeria International	(Nigeria) Grace Gabriel	(Turkey) Cemre Fere (Turkey) Ebru Yazgan	14–21, 14–21	(silver) Runner-up
2014	Lagos International	(Nigeria) Dorcas Ajoke Adesokan	(Nigeria) Tosin Damilola Atolagbe (Nigeria) Fatima Azeez	21–19, 22–20	(gold) Winner
2010	Kenya International	(Nigeria) Susan Ideh	(South Africa) Annari Viljoen (South Africa) Michelle Edwards	10–21, 21–12, 10–21	(silver) Runner-up

BWF International Challenge tournament
BWF International Series tournament
BWF Future Series tournament
