= Elme de Villiers =

South African badminton player (born 1993)

Personal information
- Born: 11 March 1993 (age 33) Kroonstad, South Africa
- Height: 1.60 m (5 ft 3 in)
- Weight: 50 kg (110 lb)

Sport
- Country: South Africa
- Sport: Badminton

Women's
- Highest ranking: 135 (WS) 18 Feb 2015; 128 (WD) 12 Nov 2015; 224 (XD) 17 May 2012
- BWF profile
Medal record
Badminton
Representing South Africa
African Games
Silver medal – second place	2015 Brazzaville	Mixed team
African Championships
Gold medal – first place	2014 Gaborone	Mixed team
Gold medal – first place	2013 Rose Hill	Mixed team
Bronze medal – third place	2014 Gaborone	Women's doubles
Bronze medal – third place	2013 Rose Hill	Women's doubles
Bronze medal – third place	2025 Douala	Mixed team
Africa Women's Team Championships
Gold medal – first place	2026 Gaborone	Women's team

Elme de Villiers (born 11 March 1993) is a South African female badminton player.

== Career ==
She started playing badminton at aged 10 in Hennenman, South Africa. In 2013, she was selected among the 14 best African players to be a member of the Road to Rio Program organised by the BWF and Badminton Confederation of Africa, to provide financial and technical support to African players and the lead-up to the 2016 Olympic Games in Rio de Janeiro. She won bronze medal at the 2013 African Badminton Championships in women's doubles event with her partner Sandra Le Grange.

== Achievements ==
=== African Badminton Championships ===
Women's Doubles
Year	Venue	Partner	Opponent	Score	Result
2014	Lobatse Stadium; Gaborone, Botswana	(South Africa) Jennifer Fry	(Seychelles) Juliette Ah-Wan (Seychelles) Alisen Camille	14-21, 21-15, 18-21	Bronze
2013	National Badminton Centre; Rose Hill, Mauritius	(South Africa) Sandra le Grange	(Seychelles) Juliette Ah-Wan (Seychelles) Alisen Camille	12-21, 16-21	Bronze

=== BWF International Challenge/Series (6 titles, 5 runners-up) ===
Women's Singles
Year	Tournament	Opponent	Score	Result
2013	Botswana International	(Portugal) Telma Santos	4-21, 11-21	(silver) Runner-up
2012	South Africa International	(South Africa) Stacey Doubell	16-21, 18-21	(silver) Runner-up
2012	Botswana International	(Mauritius) Shama Aboobakar	21-18, 16-21, 17-21	(silver) Runner-up

Women's Doubles
Year	Tournament	Partner	Opponent	Score	Result
2016	South Africa International	(South Africa) Sandra Le Grange	(South Africa) Michelle Butler-Emmett (South Africa) Jennifer Fry	15-21, 16-21	(silver) Runner-up
2014	Botswana International	(Nigeria) Grace Gabriel	(Uganda) Shamim Bangi (Zambia) Ogar Siamupangila	21-17, 18-21, 21-18	(gold) Winner
2014	Zambia International	(South Africa) Michelle Butler-Emmett	(Nigeria) Grace Gabriel (Mauritius) Kate Foo Kune	21-17, 19-21, 21-17	(gold) Winner
2013	South Africa International	(Serbia) Sandra Halilovic	(South Africa) Michelle Butler-Emmett (South Africa) Sandra Le Grange	21-14, 21-13	(gold) Winner
2013	Botswana International	(Serbia) Sandra Halilovic	(Nigeria) Grace Gabriel (Mauritius) Yeldie Louison	21-13, 21-16	(gold) Winner
2013	Mauritius International	(South Africa) Sandra Le Grange	(Nigeria) Dorcas Ajoke Adesokan (Nigeria) Grace Gabriel	21-15, 21–16	(gold) Winner
2012	Botswana International	(South Africa) Jennifer van Den Berg	(Botswana) Kgalalelo Kegakilwe (Botswana) Botho Makubate	21-7, 21-10	(gold) Winner

Mixed Doubles
Year	Tournament	Partner	Opponent	Score	Result
2012	Botswana International	(South Africa) Reneshan Naidoo	(South Africa) Andries Malan (South Africa) Jennifer Van Den Berg	10-21, 21-12, 15-21	(silver) Runner-up

BWF International Challenge tournament
BWF International Series tournament
BWF Future Series tournament
