= Cynthia Course =

Seychellois badminton player (born 1990)

Personal information
- Born: Cynthia Denise Course; 20 September 1990 (age 36)

Sport
- Country: Seychelles
- Sport: Badminton

Women's
- Highest ranking: 302 (WS) 21 Jun 2012; 193 (WD) 16 Aug 2012; 289 (XD) 3 May 2012
- BWF profile
Medal record
Badminton
Representing Seychelles
All-Africa Games
| Silver medal – second place | 2011 Maputo | Women's doubles |
| Bronze medal – third place | 2015 Brazzaville | Mixed team |
| Bronze medal – third place | 2011 Maputo | Mixed team |
| Bronze medal – third place | 2007 Algiers | Mixed team |
African Championships
| Gold medal – first place | 2007 Rose Hill | Mixed team |
| Bronze medal – third place | 2013 Rose Hill | Mixed team |
Africa Team Championships
| Bronze medal – third place | 2006 Rose Hill | Women's team |

Cynthia Denise Course (born 20 September 1990) is a Seychellois female badminton player.

== Achievements ==
=== All-Africa Games ===
Women's doubles
| Year | Venue | Partner | Opponent | Score | Result |
|---|---|---|---|---|---|
| 2011 | Escola Josina Machel; Maputo, Mozambique | (Seychelles) Allisen Camille | (South Africa) Annari Viljoen (South Africa) Stacey Doubell | 18–21, 15–21 | Silver |

=== BWF International Challenge/Series ===
Women's singles
| Year | Tournament | Opponent | Score | Result |
|---|---|---|---|---|
| 2012 | Mauritius International | (Mauritius) Shama Aboobakar | 21–18, 12–21, 17–21 | (silver) Runner-up |

Women's doubles
| Year | Tournament | Partner | Opponent | Score | Result |
|---|---|---|---|---|---|
| 2012 | Mauritius International | (Seychelles) Allisen Camille | (Mauritius) Shama Aboobakar (Mauritius) Shaama Sandooyeea | 21–16, 21–14 | (gold) Winner |

Mixed doubles
| Year | Tournament | Partner | Opponent | Score | Result |
|---|---|---|---|---|---|
| 2012 | Mauritius International | (Seychelles) Georgie Cupidon | (Mauritius) Deeneshsing Baboolall (Mauritius) Shama Aboobakar | 21–19, 21–14 | (gold) Winner |

BWF International Challenge tournament
BWF International Series tournament
BWF Future Series tournament
