= Jinkan Ifraimu =

Nigerian badminton player

Personal information
- Born: Jinkan Ifraimu Bulus; 13 December 1988 (age 37)

Sport
- Country: Nigeria
- Sport: Badminton

Men's singles & doubles
- Highest ranking: 123333333 (MS 18 March 2010); 79 (MD 18 March 2010); 201 (XD 18 March 2010)
- BWF profile
Medal record
Men's badminton
Representing Nigeria
African Games
Gold medal – first place	2007 Algiers	Mixed team
Gold medal – first place	2011 Maputo	Men's doubles
Gold medal – first place	2011 Maputo	Mixed team
Bronze medal – third place	2007 Algiers	Men's doubles
Bronze medal – third place	2011 Maputo	Men's singles
Bronze medal – third place	2015 Brazzaville	Men's doubles
Bronze medal – third place	2015 Brazzaville	Mixed team
African Championships
Gold medal – first place	2011 Marrakesh	Men's singles
Silver medal – second place	2011 Marrakesh	Men's doubles
Silver medal – second place	2011 Marrakesh	Mixed team
Silver medal – second place	2012 Addis Ababa	Men's doubles
Silver medal – second place	2013 Rose Hill	Mixed team
Bronze medal – third place	2012 Addis Ababa	Men's singles
Bronze medal – third place	2013 Rose Hill	Men's singles
Africa Team Championships
Gold medal – first place	2008 Rose Hill	Men's team
Gold medal – first place	2010 Kampala	Men's team
Silver medal – second place	2012 Addis Ababa	Men's team

Jinkan Ifraimu Bulus (born 13 December 1988) is a Nigerian badminton player.

== Achievements ==
=== All African Games ===
Men's singles
Year	Venue	Opponent	Score	Result
2011	Escola Josina Machel; Maputo, Mozambique	(South Africa) Jacob Maliekal	15–21, 14–21	Bronze

Men's doubles
Year	Venue	Partner	Opponent	Score	Result
2007	Salle OMS El Biar; Algiers, Algeria	(Nigeria) Ocholi Edicha			Bronze
2011	Escola Josina Machel; Maputo, Mozambique	(Nigeria) Ola Fagbemi	(South Africa) Dorian James (South Africa) Willem Viljoen	21–18, 21–19	Gold
2015	Gymnase Étienne Mongha; Brazzaville, Republic of the Congo	(Nigeria) Ola Fagbemi	(South Africa) Andries Malan (South Africa) Willem Viljoen	16–21, 19–21	Bronze

=== African Championships ===
Men's singles
Year	Venue	Opponent	Score	Result
2009	Moi International Sports Complex; Nairobi, Kenya	(Nigeria) Ola Fagbemi	18–21, 18–21	Silver
2010	Sharing Youth Center; Kampala, Uganda	(Nigeria) Ola Fagbemi	21–15, 21–0 retired	Gold
2011	Salle Couverte Zerktouni; Marrakesh, Morocco	(Nigeria) Ola Fagbemi	16–21, 21–19, 21–18	Gold
2012	Arat Kilo Hall; Addis Ababa, Ethiopia	(Egypt) Abdelrahman Kashkal	19–21, 16–21	Bronze
2013	National Badminton Centre; Rose Hill, Mauritius	(South Africa) Jacob Maliekal	21–19, 14–21, 17–21	Bronze

Men's doubles
Year	Venue	Partner	Opponent	Score	Result
2009	Moi International Sports Complex; Nairobi, Kenya	(Nigeria) Ola Fagbemi	(South Africa) Chris Dednam (South Africa) Dorian James	21–13, 21–14	Gold
2010	Sharing Youth Center; Kampala, Uganda	(Nigeria) Ola Fagbemi	(Nigeria) Ibrahim Adamu (Nigeria) Ocholi Edicha	21–12, 16–21, 21–14	Gold
2011	Salle Couverte Zerktouni; Marrakesh, Morocco	(Nigeria) Ola Fagbemi	(South Africa) Dorian James (South Africa) Willem Viljoen	18–21, 14–21	Silver
2012	Arat Kilo Hall; Addis Ababa, Ethiopia	(Nigeria) Ola Fagbemi	(South Africa) Dorian James (South Africa) Willem Viljoen	15–21, 5–21	Silver

=== BWF International Challenge/Series ===
Men's singles
Year	Tournament	Opponent	Score	Result
2009	Kenya International	(Iran) Ali Shahhosseini	No match	(silver) Runner-up
2010	Uganda International	(Spain) Ernesto Velázquez	18–21, 22–20, 21–13	(gold) Winner
2013	Mauritius International	(India) P. Vinay Kumar Reddy	21–12, 16–21, 14–21	(silver) Runner-up
2013	Nigeria International	(Nigeria) Enejoh Abah	21–17, 21–18	(gold) Winner

Men's doubles
Year	Tournament	Partner	Opponent	Score	Result
2008	Mauritius International	(Nigeria) Ola Fagbemi	(Nigeria) Ibrahim Adamu (Nigeria) Greg Okuonghae	21–15, 21–17	(gold) Winner
2008	Nigeria International	(Nigeria) Ola Fagbemi	(Nigeria) Akeem Ogunseye (Nigeria) Greg Okuonghae	24–22, 17–21, 21–17	(silver) Runner-up
2009	Kenya International	(Nigeria) Ola Fagbemi	(South Africa) Chris Dednam (South Africa) Dorian James	14–21, 13–21	(silver) Runner-up
2009	Mauritius International	(Nigeria) Ola Fagbemi	(South Africa) Dorian James (South Africa) Willem Viljoen	21–19, 20–22, 8–21	(silver) Runner-up
2010	Uganda International	(Nigeria) Ola Fagbemi	(South Africa) Dorian James (South Africa) Willem Viljoen	13–21, 9–21	(silver) Runner-up
2010	Kenya International	(Nigeria) Ola Fagbemi	(South Africa) Dorian James (South Africa) Willem Viljoen	20–22, 17–21	(silver) Runner-up
2011	Botswana International	(Nigeria) Ola Fagbemi	(South Africa) Dorian James (South Africa) Willem Viljoen	23–21, 13–21, 21–15	(gold) Winner
2012	Uganda International	(Nigeria) Ola Fagbemi	(South Africa) Dorian James (South Africa) Willem Viljoen	22–24, 19–21	(silver) Runner-up
2013	Nigeria International	(Nigeria) Ola Fagbemi	(Nigeria) Enejoh Abah (Nigeria) Victor Makanju	22–20, 21–19	(gold) Winner
2014	Lagos International	(Nigeria) Ola Fagbemi	(South Africa) Andries Malan (South Africa) Willem Viljoen	14–21, 20–22	(silver) Runner-up
2014	Nigeria International	(Nigeria) Ola Fagbemi	(Nigeria) Enejoh Abah (Nigeria) Victor Makanju	10–11, 11–5, 11–8, 11–9	(gold) Winner

Mixed doubles
Year	Tournament	Partner	Opponent	Score	Result
2010	Kenya International	(Nigeria) Susan Ideh	(South Africa) Willem Viljoen (South Africa) Annari Viljoen	12–21, 10–21	(silver) Runner-up
2014	Nigeria International	(Nigeria) Susan Ideh	(Nigeria) Ola Fagbemi (Nigeria) Dorcas Ajoke Adesokan	8–11, 11–4, 7–11, 11–10, 11–8	(gold) Winner

BWF International Challenge tournament
BWF International Series tournament
BWF Future Series tournament
