= Nadine Ashraf =

Egyptian badminton player (born 1993)

Personal information
- Born: 1 April 1993 (age 33)

Sport
- Country: Egypt
- Sport: Badminton

Women's singles & doubles
- Highest ranking: 130 (WS 28 April 2016); 42 (WD 13 October 2016); 103 (XD 12 September 2013)
- BWF profile
Medal record
Women's badminton
Representing Egypt
African Championships
Gold medal – first place	2017 Benoni	Mixed team
Africa Team Championships
Silver medal – second place	2016 Rose Hill	Women's team
Bronze medal – third place	2012 Addis Ababa	Women's team

Nadine Ashraf (born 1 April 1993) is an Egyptian badminton player. She was part of the national team that won the mixed team title in 2017 African Championships.

== Achievements ==
=== BWF International Challenge/Series (2 titles, 3 runners-up) ===
Women's doubles
Year	Tournament	Partner	Opponent	Score	Result
2016	Egypt International	(Egypt) Menna El-Tanany	(Belarus) Krestina Silich (Lithuania) Gerda Voitechovskaja	21–17, 17–21, 7–21	(silver) Runner-up
2015	Zambia International	(Egypt) Menna El-Tanany	(Iran) Negin Amiripour (Iran) Sorayya Aghaei	No match	(gold) Winner
2015	Egypt International	(Egypt) Menna El-Tanany	(Egypt) Doha Hany (Egypt) Hadia Hosny	26–28, 13–21	(silver) Runner-up
2015	Ethiopia International	(Egypt) Menna El-Tanany	(Turkey) Cemre Fere (Turkey) Ebru Yazgan	10–21, 9–21	(silver) Runner-up

Mixed doubles
Year	Tournament	Partner	Opponent	Score	Result
2015	Uganda International	(Egypt) Mahmoud El Sayad	(Egypt) Abdelrahman Kashkal (Egypt) Hadia Hosny	14–21, 21–15, 21–19	(gold) Winner

BWF International Challenge tournament
BWF International Series tournament
BWF Future Series tournament
