= Shama Aboobakar =

Mauritian badminton player

Personal information
- Born: 6 July 1983 (age 43) Beau Bassin-Rose Hill, Mauritius
- Years active: 1999
- Height: 1.65 m (5 ft 5 in)
- Weight: 55 kg (121 lb)

Sport
- Country: Mauritius
- Sport: Badminton
- Handedness: Right
- Coached by: Mardeven Yagambrum

Women's singles & doubles
- Highest ranking: 161 (WS 28 Mar 2013); 129 (WD 29 Mar 2012); 219 (XD 22 Oct 2009)
- BWF profile
Medal record
Women's badminton
Representing Mauritius
All-Africa Games
Bronze medal – third place	2003 Abuja	Mixed team
African Championships
Silver medal – second place	2013 Rose Hill	Women's doubles
Silver medal – second place	2004 Rose Hill	Mixed doubles
Bronze medal – third place	2013 Rose Hill	Mixed doubles
Bronze medal – third place	2013 Rose Hill	Mixed team
Bronze medal – third place	2011 Marrakesh	Mixed team
Bronze medal – third place	2009 Nairobi	Mixed doubles
Bronze medal – third place	2009 Nairobi	Mixed team
Bronze medal – third place	2002 Casablanca	Women's singles
Bronze medal – third place	2002 Casablanca	Mixed team
Africa Team Championships
Gold medal – first place	2016 Rose Hill	Women's team
Silver medal – second place	2006 Rose Hill	Women's team
Bronze medal – third place	2012 Addis Ababa	Women's team

Shama Aboobakar (born 6 July 1983) is a Mauritian badminton player.

== Career ==
She competed at the 2006 and 2010 Commonwealth Games in the women's singles, doubles, mixed doubles, and team events. In 2012, she became a champion at the Mauritius International and Botswana International tournaments in women's singles event.

== Achievements ==
=== African Championships ===
Women's singles
Year	Venue	Opponent	Score	Result
2002	Casablanca, Morocco	(Nigeria) Grace Daniel	7-8, 7-5, 5-7	Bronze

Women's doubles
Year	Venue	Partner	Opponent	Score	Result
2013	National Badminton Centre; Rose Hill, Mauritius	(Mauritius) Yeldy Louison	(Seychelles) Juliette Ah-Wan (Seychelles) Allisen Camille	21-18, 16-21, 14-21	Silver

Mixed doubles
Year	Venue	Partner	Opponent	Score	Result
2013	National Badminton Centre; Rose Hill, Mauritius	(Mauritius) Denneshsing Baboolall	(South Africa) Willem Viljoen (South Africa) Michelle Butler-Emmett	15-21, 18-21	Bronze
2009	Moi International Sports Complex; Nairobi, Kenya	(Mauritius) Sahir Edoo	(Nigeria) Ola Fagbemi (Nigeria) Grace Daniel	10-21, 19-21	Bronze
2004	National Badminton Centre; Rose Hill, Mauritius	(Mauritius) Stephan Beeharry	(Nigeria) Greg Okuonghae (Nigeria) Grace Daniel	9-15, 15-11, 9-15	Silver

=== BWF International Challenge/Series ===
Women's singles
Year	Tournament	Opponent	Score	Result
2012	Botswana International	(South Africa) Elme de Villiers	18–21, 21–16, 21–17	(gold) Winner
2012	Ethiopia International	(Uganda) Shamim Bangi	15–21, 21–19, 19–21	(silver) Runner-up
2012	Mauritius International	(Seychelles) Cynthia Course	18–21, 21–12, 21–17	(gold) Winner

Women's doubles
Year	Tournament	Partner	Opponent	Score	Result
2013	Uganda International	(Nigeria) Grace Gabriel	(Uganda) Shamim Bangi (Uganda) Margaret Nankabirwa	21–13, 18–21, 21–12	(gold) Winner
2012	South Africa International	(South Africa) Stacey Doubell	(South Africa) Michelle Edwards (South Africa) Annari Viljoen	19–21, 21–15, 13–21	(silver) Runner-up
2012	Mauritius International	(Mauritius) Shaama Sandooyea	(Seychelles) Allisen Camille (Seychelles) Cynthia Course	16–21, 14–21	(silver) Runner-up
2010	Mauritius International	(Mauritius) Amrita Sawaram	(Australia) Leisha Cooper (Mauritius) Yeldi Louison		(silver) Runner-up
2009	Mauritius International	(Mauritius) Amrita Sawaram	(Nigeria) Susan Ideh (Seychelles) Juliette Ah-Wan	18–21, 17–21	(silver) Runner-up
2005	Kenya International	(Mauritius) Amrita Sawaram	(Uganda) Fiona Nakalema (Uganda) Fiona Ssozi	Walkover	(gold) Winner
2005	South Africa International	(Mauritius) Amrita Sawaram	(South Africa) Chantal Botts (South Africa) Michelle Edwards	5–15, 7–15	(silver) Runner-up
2002	Mauritius International	(Mauritius) Martine de Souza	(England) Felicity Gallup (England) Joanne Muggeridge	4–11, 0–11	(silver) Runner-up

Mixed doubles
Year	Tournament	Partner	Opponent	Score	Result
2012	Mauritius International	(Mauritius) Denneshsing Baboolall	(Seychelles) Georgie Cupidon (Seychelles) Cynthia Course	19–21, 14–21	(silver) Runner-up
2008	South Africa International	(Mauritius) Stephan Beeharry	(South Africa) Chris Dednam (South Africa) Michelle Edwards	17–21, 12–21	(silver) Runner-up
2005	Kenya International	(Mauritius) Stephan Beeharry	(Mauritius) Édouard Clarisse (Mauritius) Amrita Sawaram	16–17, 7–15	(silver) Runner-up
2002	Mauritius International	(Mauritius) Stephan Beeharry	(Wales) Matthew Hughes (England) Joanne Muggeridge	5–11, 3–11	(silver) Runner-up
2002	Kenya International	(Mauritius) Stephan Beeharry	(Nigeria) Ola Fagbemi (Nigeria) Grace Daniel	2–7, 7–1, 7–2, 7–4	(gold) Winner
2001	Mauritius International	(Mauritius) Stephan Beeharry	(Seychelles) Georgie Cupidon (Seychelles) Juliette Ah-Wan	7–2, 7–3, 7–8	(gold) Winner

BWF International Challenge tournament
BWF International Series tournament
BWF Future Series tournament
