= Abdelrahman Kashkal =

Egyptian badminton player (born 1987)

Personal information
- Born: Abdelrahman Ali Mahmoud Kashkal; 25 August 1987 (age 39)

Sport
- Country: Egypt
- Sport: Badminton

Men's
- Highest ranking: 175 (MS) 1 Oct 2015; 47 (MD) 15 Sep 2016; 50 (XD) 28 Apr 2016
- BWF profile
Medal record
Badminton
Representing Egypt
African Games
Silver medal – second place	2015 Brazzaville	Men's doubles
Bronze medal – third place	2015 Brazzaville	Mixed doubles
African Badminton Championships
Silver medal – second place	2012 Addis Ababa	Men's singles
Bronze medal – third place	2011 Marrakesh	Men's doubles
Bronze medal – third place	2011 Marrakesh	Mixed team
Africa Team Championships
Bronze medal – third place	2012 Addis Ababa	Men's team
Bronze medal – third place	2010 Kampala	Men's team
Bronze medal – third place	2008 Rose Hill	Men's team

Abdelrahman Ali Mahmoud Kashkal (born 25 August 1987) is an Egyptian male badminton player.

== Achievements ==
=== All African Games ===
Men's doubles
Year	Venue	Partner	Opponent	Score	Result
2015	Gymnase Étienne Mongha; Brazzaville, Republic of the Congo	(Egypt) Ali Ahmed El-Khateeb	(South Africa) Andries Malan (South Africa) Willem Viljoen	10–21, 13–21	Silver

Mixed doubles
Year	Venue	Partner	Opponent	Score	Result
2015	Gymnase Étienne Mongha; Brazzaville, Republic of the Congo	(Egypt) Hadia Hosny	(South Africa) Willem Viljoen (South Africa) Michelle Butler-Emmett	17–21, 19–21	Bronze

=== African Championships ===
Men's singles
Year	Venue	Opponent	Score	Result
2012	Arat Kilo Hall, Addis Ababa, Ethiopia	(South Africa) Jacob Maliekal	15–21, 15–21	Silver

Men's doubles
Year	Venue	Partner	Opponent	Score	Result
2011	Marrakesh, Morocco	(Egypt) Ali Ahmed El Khateeb	(Nigeria) Jinkan Bulus (Nigeria) Olaoluwa Fagbemi	9–21, 19–21	Bronze

=== BWF International Challenge/Series (5 titles, 8 runners-up) ===
Men's doubles
Year	Tournament	Partner	Opponent	Score	Result
2016	Egypt International	(Egypt) Ali Ahmed El Khateeb	(France) Vanmael Heriau (France) Florent Riancho	3–21, 9–21	(silver) Runner-up
2016	Uganda International	(Egypt) Ali Ahmed El Khateeb	(Sri Lanka) Dinuka Karunaratna (Sri Lanka) Niluka Karunaratne	17–21, 17–21	(silver) Runner-up
2015	Zambia International	(Egypt) Ali Ahmed El Khateeb	(South Africa) Andries Malan (South Africa) Willem Viljoen	14–21, 15–21	(silver) Runner-up
2015	Nigeria International	(Egypt) Ali Ahmed El Khateeb	(Turkey) Emre Vural (Turkey) Sinan Zorlu	14–21, 19–21	(silver) Runner-up
2013	Uganda International	(Egypt) Mahmoud El Sayad	(Italy) Giovanni Greco (Italy) Daniel Messersi	18–21, 18–21	(silver) Runner-up

Mixed doubles
Year	Tournament	Partner	Opponent	Score	Result
2016	Uganda International	(Egypt) Hadia Hosny	(Jordan) Mohd Naser Mansour Nayef (Jordan) Mazahreh Leina Fehmi	21–16, 16–21, 21–11	(gold) Winner
2015	South Africa International	(Egypt) Hadia Hosny	(South Africa) Andries Malan (South Africa) Jennifer Fry	21–12, 19–21, 18–21	(silver) Runner-up
2015	Botswana International	(Egypt) Hadia Hosny	(Zambia) Juma Muwowo (Zambia) Ogar Siamupangila	22–20, 21–14	(gold) Winner
2015	Zambia International	(Egypt) Hadia Hosny	(Zambia) Juma Muwowo (Zambia) Ogar Siamupangila	21–15, 21–8	(gold) Winner
2015	Egypt International	(Egypt) Hadia Hosny	(Egypt) Ahmed Salah (Egypt) Menna Eltanany	18–21, 15–21	(silver) Runner-up
2013	South Africa International	(Egypt) Hadia Hosny	(Mauritius) Sahir Edoo (Mauritius) Yeldie Louison	21–12, 21–19	(gold) Winner
2013	Botswana International	(Egypt) Hadia Hosny	(Mauritius) Sahir Edoo (Mauritius) Yeldie Louison	15–21, 21–14, 21–17	(gold) Winner
2013	Uganda International	(Egypt) Hadia Hosny	(Egypt) Mahmoud El Sayad (Egypt) Nadine Ashraf	21–14, 15–21, 19–21	(silver) Runner-up

BWF International Challenge tournament
BWF International Series tournament
BWF Future Series tournament
