= Yeldy Louison =

Mauritian badminton player (born 1991)

Personal information
- Born: Yeldy Marie Louison; 11 November 1991 (age 35) Quatre Bornes, Mauritius
- Height: 1.62 m (5 ft 4 in)
- Weight: 60 kg (132 lb)

Sport
- Country: Mauritius
- Sport: Badminton

Women's
- Highest ranking: 190 (WS) 20 Oct 2011; 124 (WD) 9 Jun 2016; 144 (XD) 19 Apr 2012
- BWF profile
Medal record
Badminton
Representing Mauritius
All-Africa Games
Gold medal – first place	2015 Brazzaville	Mixed team
Silver medal – second place	2015 Brazzaville	Women's doubles
African Championships
Gold medal – first place	2014 Gaborone	Women's doubles
Silver medal – second place	2013 Rose Hill	Women's doubles
Bronze medal – third place	2014 Gaborone	Mixed team
Bronze medal – third place	2013 Rose Hill	Mixed doubles
Bronze medal – third place	2013 Rose Hill	Mixed team
Bronze medal – third place	2011 Marrakesh	Mixed team
Africa Team Championships
Gold medal – first place	2016 Rose Hill	Women's team
Bronze medal – third place	2008 Rose Hill	Women's team

Yeldy Marie Louison (born 11 November 1991) is a Mauritian female badminton player.

== Achievements ==
=== All-Africa Games ===
Women's doubles
Year	Venue	Partner	Opponent	Score	Result
2015	Gymnase Étienne Mongha; Brazzaville, Republic of the Congo	(Mauritius) Kate Foo Kune	(Seychelles) Juliette Ah-Wan (Seychelles) Allisen Camille	20–22, 21–18, 14–21	Silver

=== African Championships ===
Women's doubles
Year	Venue	Partner	Opponent	Score	Result
2014	Lobatse Stadium; Gaborone, Botswana	(Mauritius) Kate Foo Kune	(Seychelles) Juliette Ah-Wan (Seychelles) Allisen Camille	21–17, 22–20	Gold
2013	National Badminton Centre; Rose Hill, Mauritius	(Mauritius) Shama Aboobakar	(Seychelles) Juliette Ah-Wan (Seychelles) Allisen Camille	21–18, 16–21, 14–21	Silver

Mixed doubles
Year	Venue	Partner	Opponent	Score	Result
2013	National Badminton Centre; Rose Hill, Mauritius	(Mauritius) Sahir Edoo	(South Africa) Andries Malan (South Africa) Jennifer Fry	19–21, 15–21	Bronze

=== BWF International Challenge/Series ===
Women's doubles
Year	Tournament	Partner	Opponent	Score	Result
2014	Mauritius International	(Mauritius) Kate Foo Kune	(Germany) Annika Horbach (New Zealand) Maria Mata Masinipeni	12–21, 12–21	(silver) Runner-up
2013	Botswana International	(Nigeria) Grace Gabriel	(South Africa) Elme de Villiers (Serbia) Sandra Halilovic	13–21, 16–21	(silver) Runner-up
2010	Mauritius International	(Australia) Leisha Cooper	(Mauritius) Amrita Sawaram (Mauritius) Shama Aboobakar		(gold) Winner

Mixed doubles
Year	Tournament	Partner	Opponent	Score	Result
2016	Rose Hill International	(Mauritius) Sahir Abdool Edoo	(Ghana) Emmanuel Yaw Donkor (Ghana) Gifty Mensah	21–18, 27–29, 26–24	(gold) Winner
2015	Mauritius International	(Mauritius) Sahir Abdool Edoo	(South Africa) Andries Malan (South Africa) Jennifer Fry	18–21, 16–21	(silver) Runner-up
2013	South Africa International	(Mauritius) Sahir Abdool Edoo	(Egypt) Abdelrahman Kashkal (Egypt) Hadia Hosny	12–21, 19–21	(silver) Runner-up
2013	Botswana International	(Mauritius) Sahir Abdool Edoo	(Egypt) Abdelrahman Kashkal (Egypt) Hadia Hosny	21–15, 14–21, 17–21	(silver) Runner-up

BWF International Challenge tournament
BWF International Series tournament
BWF Future Series tournament
