= Jacob Maliekal =

South African badminton player (born 1991)

Personal information
- Born: Jacob Maliekal; 1 January 1991 (age 35) Mthatha, South Africa
- Height: 1.72 m (5 ft 8 in)
- Weight: 70 kg (154 lb)

Sport
- Country: South Africa
- Sport: Badminton
- Handedness: Right

Men's singles
- Highest ranking: 64 (MS) 15 Sep 2016; 224 (MD) 6 Oct 2011; 237 (XD) 22 Oct 2009
- Current ranking: 69 (15 Dec 2016)
- BWF profile
Medal record
Men's Badminton
Representing South Africa
All-Africa Games
Gold medal – first place	2015 Brazzaville	Men's singles
Gold medal – first place	2011 Maputo	Men's singles
Silver medal – second place	2015 Brazzaville	Mixed team
Silver medal – second place	2011 Maputo	Mixed team
African Championships
Gold medal – first place	2014 Gaborone	Men's singles
Gold medal – first place	2014 Gaborone	Mixed team
Gold medal – first place	2013 Rose Hill	Men's singles
Gold medal – first place	2013 Rose Hill	Mixed team
Gold medal – first place	2012 Addis Ababa	Men's singles
African Team Championships
Gold medal – first place	2016 Rose Hill	Men's team
Gold medal – first place	2012 Addis Ababa	Men's team
Bronze medal – third place	2010 Kampala	Men's team

Jacob Maliekal (born 1 January 1991) is a male badminton player from South Africa. He became the South Africa national team members in 2009 and won gold medals at the 2011 and 2014 African Games in badminton men's singles event. He competed at the 2016 Summer Olympics held in Rio de Janeiro, Brazil.

He was one of the 14 players selected for the Road to Rio Program, a program that aimed to help African badminton players to compete at the 2016 Summer Olympics.

== Achievements ==
=== All-Africa Games ===
Men's singles
Year	Venue	Opponent	Score	Result
2015	Gymnase Étienne Mongha, Brazzaville, Republic of the Congo	(South Africa) Prakash Vijayanath	21–17, 21–17	Gold
2011	Escola Josina Machel, Maputo, Mozambique	(Uganda) Edwin Ekiring	21–15, 21–14	Gold

=== African Championships ===
Men's singles
Year	Venue	Opponent	Score	Result
2014	Lobatse Stadium, Gaborone, Botswana	(Nigeria) Enejoh Abah	21–11, 21–17	Gold
2013	National Badminton Centre, Beau-Bassin Rose-Hill, Mauritius	(South Africa) Prakash Vijayanath	21–13, 21–12	Gold
2012	Arat Kilo Hall, Addis Ababa, Ethiopia	(Egypt) A Kashkal	21–15, 21–15	Gold

=== BWF International Challenge/Series ===
Men's singles
Year	Tournament	Opponent	Score	Result
2016	Botswana International	(Russia) Anatoliy Yartsev	10–21, 18–21	(silver) Runner-up
2016	South Africa International	(Russia) Anatoliy Yartsev	21–5, 21–13	(gold) Winner
2015	Kampala International	(Uganda) Edwin Ekiring	21–8, 18–21, 21–10	(gold) Winner
2015	Waikato International	(Australia) James Eunson	20–22, 21–19, 22–20	(gold) Winner
2015	Uganda International	(Egypt) Ali Ahmed El Khateeb	11–8, 11–10, 11–2	(gold) Winner
2014	Uganda International	(Sri Lanka) Dinuka Karunaratne	12–21, 15–21	(silver) Runner-up
2013	South Africa International	(Slovenia) Roj Alen	20–22, 21–15, 21–10	(gold) Winner
2013	Botswana International	(Slovenia) Roj Alen	22–20, 21–15	(gold) Winner

Men's doubles
Year	Tournament	Partner	Opponent	Score	Result
2010	Botswana International	(South Africa) Enrico James	(South Africa) Dorian James (South Africa) Willem Viljoen	19–21, 10–21	(silver) Runner-up

BWF International Challenge tournament
BWF International Series tournament
BWF Future Series tournament
