= 2012 BWF season =

2012 BWF Season
Details
- Duration: January 3, 2012 – December 28, 2012

Achievements (singles)

Awards
- Player of the year: (China) Cai Yun & (China) Fu Haifeng (Male) (China) Wang Yihan (Female)

The 2012 BWF Season was the overall badminton circuit organized by the Badminton World Federation (BWF) for the 2012 badminton season to publish and promote the sport. Besides the BWF World Championships, BWF promotes the sport of badminton through an extensive worldwide programme of events in four structure levels. They were the individual tournaments called Super Series, Grand Prix Events, International Challenge and International Series. Besides the individual tournaments, team events such as Thomas Cup & Uber Cup and Sudirman Cup are held every other year.

The 2012 BWF season calendar comprised the Olympic Games, World Championships tournaments, the Thomas and Uber Cup, the BWF Super Series (Super Series, Super Series Premier, Super Series Finals), the Grand Prix (Grand Prix Gold and Grand Prix), the International Series (International Series and International Challenge), and Future Series.

== Schedule ==
This is the complete schedule of events on the 2012 calendar, with the Champions and Runners-up documented.

Key

World Championships
Super Series Finals
Super Series Premier
Super Series
Grand Prix Gold
Grand Prix
International Challenge
International Series
Future Series
Team events

=== January ===
Week of	Tournament	Champions	Runners-up
January 2	Korea Open; Seoul, South Korea; Super Series Premier $1,000,000 – 32MS/32WS/32MD/32WD/32XD; Draw	(Malaysia) Lee Chong Wei; 12–21, 21–18, 21–14	(China) Lin Dan
January 2	Korea Open; Seoul, South Korea; Super Series Premier $1,000,000 – 32MS/32WS/32MD/32WD/32XD; Draw	(China) Wang Shixian; 21–12, 21–17	(China) Jiang Yanjiao
January 2	Korea Open; Seoul, South Korea; Super Series Premier $1,000,000 – 32MS/32WS/32MD/32WD/32XD; Draw	(China) Cai Yun (China) Fu Haifeng; 18–21, 21–17, 21–19	(South Korea) Jung Jae-sung (South Korea) Lee Yong-dae
January 2	Korea Open; Seoul, South Korea; Super Series Premier $1,000,000 – 32MS/32WS/32MD/32WD/32XD; Draw	(China) Tian Qing (China) Zhao Yunlei; 21–18, 21–13	(South Korea) Ha Jung-eun (South Korea) Kim Min-jung
January 2	Korea Open; Seoul, South Korea; Super Series Premier $1,000,000 – 32MS/32WS/32MD/32WD/32XD; Draw	(China) Xu Chen (China) Ma Jin; 21–12, 19–21, 21–10	(South Korea) Lee Yong-dae (South Korea) Ha Jung-eun
January 9	Malaysia Open; Kuala Lumpur, Malaysia; Super Series $400,000 – 32MS/32WS/32MD/32WD/32XD; Draw	(Malaysia) Lee Chong Wei; 21–6, 21–13	(Japan) Kenichi Tago
January 9	Malaysia Open; Kuala Lumpur, Malaysia; Super Series $400,000 – 32MS/32WS/32MD/32WD/32XD; Draw	(China) Wang Yihan; 21–19, 21-11	(China) Wang Xin
January 9	Malaysia Open; Kuala Lumpur, Malaysia; Super Series $400,000 – 32MS/32WS/32MD/32WD/32XD; Draw	(Chinese Taipei) Fang Chieh-min (Chinese Taipei) Lee Sheng-mu; 16–21, 21–16, 21–16	(South Korea) Cho Gun-woo (South Korea) Shin Baek-choel
January 9	Malaysia Open; Kuala Lumpur, Malaysia; Super Series $400,000 – 32MS/32WS/32MD/32WD/32XD; Draw	(Denmark) Christinna Pedersen (Denmark) Kamilla Rytter Juhl; 21–19, 21–18	(South Korea) Ha Jung-eun (South Korea) Kim Min-jung
January 9	Malaysia Open; Kuala Lumpur, Malaysia; Super Series $400,000 – 32MS/32WS/32MD/32WD/32XD; Draw	(China) Zhang Nan (China) Zhao Yunlei; 21–12, 21–9	(China) Xu Chen (China) Ma Jin
January 9	Estonian International; Tallinn, Estonia; International Series $5,000 – 32MS/32WS/32MD/16WD/16XD	(Finland) Ville Lång; 21–8, 21–15	(Estonia) Raul Must
January 9	Estonian International; Tallinn, Estonia; International Series $5,000 – 32MS/32WS/32MD/16WD/16XD	(Netherlands) Judith Meulendijks; 21–13, 10–21, 21–14	(England) Elizabeth Cann
January 9	Estonian International; Tallinn, Estonia; International Series $5,000 – 32MS/32WS/32MD/16WD/16XD	(France) Laurent Constantin (France) Sébastien Vincent; 21–17, 19–21, 21–15	(Netherlands) Jorrit de Ruiter (Netherlands) Dave Khodabux
January 9	Estonian International; Tallinn, Estonia; International Series $5,000 – 32MS/32WS/32MD/16WD/16XD	(Netherlands) Selena Piek (Netherlands) Iris Tabeling; 21–15, 13–21, 21–10	(Netherlands) Samantha Barning (Netherlands) Ilse Vaessen
January 9	Estonian International; Tallinn, Estonia; International Series $5,000 – 32MS/32WS/32MD/16WD/16XD	(Netherlands) Dave Khodabux (Netherlands) Selena Piek; 21–7, 21–12	(Netherlands) Jorrit de Ruiter (Netherlands) Samantha Barning
January 16	Swedish Masters; Stockholm, Sweden; International Challenge $15,000 – 32MS/32WS/32MD/32WD/32XD	(Hong Kong) Chan Yan Kit; 21–17, 21–19	(Netherlands) Eric Pang
January 16	Swedish Masters; Stockholm, Sweden; International Challenge $15,000 – 32MS/32WS/32MD/32WD/32XD	(France) Pi Hongyan; 21–13, 21–17	(Czech Republic) Kristína Gavnholt
January 16	Swedish Masters; Stockholm, Sweden; International Challenge $15,000 – 32MS/32WS/32MD/32WD/32XD	(Russia) Vladimir Ivanov (Russia) Ivan Sozonov; 21–16, 21–9	(Netherlands) Jorrit de Ruiter (Netherlands) Dave Khodabux
January 16	Swedish Masters; Stockholm, Sweden; International Challenge $15,000 – 32MS/32WS/32MD/32WD/32XD	(England) Mariana Agathangelou (England) Heather Olver; 21–15, 21–12	(United States) Eva Lee (United States) Paula Lynn Obañana
January 16	Swedish Masters; Stockholm, Sweden; International Challenge $15,000 – 32MS/32WS/32MD/32WD/32XD	(England) Nathan Robertson (England) Jenny Wallwork; 21–17, 21–17	(Denmark) Mads Pieler Kolding (Denmark) Julie Houmann

=== February ===
Week of	Tournament	Champions	Runners-up
February 1	Uganda International; Kampala, Uganda; International Series $5,000 – 32MS/32WS/16MD/16WD/16XD	(Sri Lanka) Niluka Karunaratne; 21–11, 21–18	(Italy) Wisnu Haryo Putro
February 1	Uganda International; Kampala, Uganda; International Series $5,000 – 32MS/32WS/16MD/16WD/16XD	(Switzerland) Jeanine Cicognini; 21–14, 14–10, retired	(Turkey) Özge Bayrak
February 1	Uganda International; Kampala, Uganda; International Series $5,000 – 32MS/32WS/16MD/16WD/16XD	(South Africa) Dorian James (South Africa) Willem Viljoen; 24–22, 21–19	(Nigeria) Ola Fagbemi (Nigeria) Jinkan Ifraimu
February 1	Uganda International; Kampala, Uganda; International Series $5,000 – 32MS/32WS/16MD/16WD/16XD	(South Africa) Michelle Edwards (South Africa) Annari Viljoen; Walkover	(Turkey) Özge Bayrak (Turkey) Neslihan Yiğit
February 1	Uganda International; Kampala, Uganda; International Series $5,000 – 32MS/32WS/16MD/16WD/16XD	(South Africa) Willem Viljoen (South Africa) Annari Viljoen; 21–7, 21–10	(South Africa) Dorian James (South Africa) Michelle Edwards
February 13	Badminton Asia Thomas & Uber Cup Preliminaries; Macau; CC Team Championships; 14 teams (M)/14 teams (W); Draw	China; 3–0	Japan
February 13	Badminton Asia Thomas & Uber Cup Preliminaries; Macau; CC Team Championships; 14 teams (M)/14 teams (W); Draw	Japan; 3–2	China
February 13	European Men's and Women's Team Badminton Championships; Amsterdam, Netherlands; CC Team Championships; 30 teams (M)/30 teams (W); Draw	Denmark; 3–0	Germany
February 13	European Men's and Women's Team Badminton Championships; Amsterdam, Netherlands; CC Team Championships; 30 teams (M)/30 teams (W); Draw	Germany; 3–1	Denmark
February 13	Thomas & Uber Cup Preliminaries - Oceania; Ballarat Victoria, Australia; CC Team Championships; 4 teams (M)/3 teams (W)	Australia	New Zealand
February 13	Thomas & Uber Cup Preliminaries - Oceania; Ballarat Victoria, Australia; CC Team Championships; 4 teams (M)/3 teams (W)	New Zealand	Australia
February 13	Thomas & Uber Cup Preliminaries - Pan Am; El Monte, California, USA; CC Team Championships; 8 teams (M)/5 teams (W)	United States; 3–1	Guatemala
February 13	Thomas & Uber Cup Preliminaries - Pan Am; El Monte, California, USA; CC Team Championships; 8 teams (M)/5 teams (W)	United States	Canada
February 13	Iran Fajr International; Tehran, Iran; International Challenge $15,000 – 64MS/64WS/32MD/16WD	(Sri Lanka) Niluka Karunaratne; 21–18, 21–15	(India) Sameer Verma
February 13	Iran Fajr International; Tehran, Iran; International Challenge $15,000 – 64MS/64WS/32MD/16WD	(Turkey) Neslihan Yiğit; 21–16, 21–14	(Japan) Yu Wakita
February 13	Iran Fajr International; Tehran, Iran; International Challenge $15,000 – 64MS/64WS/32MD/16WD	(Indonesia) Marcus Fernaldi Gideon (Indonesia) Agripina Prima Rahmanto Putra; 21–18, 21–18	(India) Tarun Kona (India) Arun Vishnu
February 13	Iran Fajr International; Tehran, Iran; International Challenge $15,000 – 64MS/64WS/32MD/16WD	(Japan) Rie Eto (Japan) Yu Wakita; 21–15, 23–21	(Japan) Ayumi Tasaki (Japan) Seiko Yamada
February 20	Oceania Badminton Championships; Ballarat Victoria, Australia; Continental Championships; 32MS/32WS/32MD/32WD/32XD	(New Zealand) James Eunson; 21–19, 21–15	(New Zealand) Michael Fowke
February 20	Oceania Badminton Championships; Ballarat Victoria, Australia; Continental Championships; 32MS/32WS/32MD/32WD/32XD	(New Zealand) Michelle Chan; 21–10, 21–17	(Australia) Verdet Kessler
February 20	Oceania Badminton Championships; Ballarat Victoria, Australia; Continental Championships; 32MS/32WS/32MD/32WD/32XD	(Australia) Ross Smith (Australia) Glenn Warfe; 21–17, 21–18	(New Zealand) Kevin Dennerly-Minturn (New Zealand) Oliver Leydon-Davis
February 20	Oceania Badminton Championships; Ballarat Victoria, Australia; Continental Championships; 32MS/32WS/32MD/32WD/32XD	(Australia) Leanne Choo (Australia) Renuga Veeran; 21–16, 21–13	(Australia) Ann-Louise Slee (Australia) Eugenia Tanaka
February 20	Oceania Badminton Championships; Ballarat Victoria, Australia; Continental Championships; 32MS/32WS/32MD/32WD/32XD	(Australia) Raymond Tam (Australia) Eugenia Tanaka; 21–17, 21–19	(Australia) Glenn Warfe (Australia) Leanne Choo
February 20	Austrian International; Vienna, Austria; International Challenge $15,000 – 32MS/32WS/32MD/32WD/32XD	(Poland) Przemysław Wacha; 14–21, 21–15, 21–16	(Belgium) Yuhan Tan
February 20	Austrian International; Vienna, Austria; International Challenge $15,000 – 32MS/32WS/32MD/32WD/32XD	(Japan) Sayaka Takahashi; 21–17 21–9	(Hong Kong) Chan Tsz Ka
February 20	Austrian International; Vienna, Austria; International Challenge $15,000 – 32MS/32WS/32MD/32WD/32XD	(India) K. T. Rupesh Kumar (India) Sanave Thomas; 23–21, 22–20	(Japan) Hiroyuki Saeki (Japan) Ryota Taohata
February 20	Austrian International; Vienna, Austria; International Challenge $15,000 – 32MS/32WS/32MD/32WD/32XD	(Malaysia) Ng Hui Ern (Malaysia) Ng Hui Lin; 21–16, 21–18	(United States) Eva Lee (United States) Paula Lynn Obañana
February 20	Austrian International; Vienna, Austria; International Challenge $15,000 – 32MS/32WS/32MD/32WD/32XD	(Hong Kong) Wong Wai Hong (Hong Kong) Chau Hoi Wah; 21–6, 21–10	(Switzerland) Anthony Dumartheray (Switzerland) Sabrina Jaquet
February 20	Thomas & Uber Cups Preliminaries for Africa; Addis Ababa, Ethiopia; CC Team Championships; Draw	South Africa; 3–1	Nigeria
February 20	Thomas & Uber Cups Preliminaries for Africa; Addis Ababa, Ethiopia; CC Team Championships; Draw	South Africa; 3–1	Nigeria
February 20	African Badminton Championships; Addis Ababa, Ethiopia; Continental Championships	(South Africa) Jacob Maliekal; 21–15, 21–15	(Egypt) Abdelrahman Kashkal
February 20	African Badminton Championships; Addis Ababa, Ethiopia; Continental Championships	(Nigeria) Grace Gabriel; 21–19, 14–21, 21–16	(Nigeria) Fatima Azeez
February 20	African Badminton Championships; Addis Ababa, Ethiopia; Continental Championships	(South Africa) Dorian James (South Africa) Willem Viljoen; 21–15, 21–5	(Nigeria) Ola Fagbemi (Nigeria) Jinkan Ifraimu
February 20	African Badminton Championships; Addis Ababa, Ethiopia; Continental Championships	(South Africa) Annari Viljoen (South Africa) Michelle Edwards; 21–16, 21–19	(Nigeria) Grace Daniel (Nigeria) Susan Ideh
February 20	African Badminton Championships; Addis Ababa, Ethiopia; Continental Championships	(South Africa) Dorian James (South Africa) Michelle Edwards; 21–16, 21–6	(South Africa) Enrico James (South Africa) Stacey Doubel
February 27	German Open; Mülheim, Germany; Grand Prix Gold $125,000 – 64MS/32WS/32MD/32WD/32XD; Draw	(China) Lin Dan; 21–11, 21–11	(Indonesia) Simon Santoso
February 27	German Open; Mülheim, Germany; Grand Prix Gold $125,000 – 64MS/32WS/32MD/32WD/32XD; Draw	(China) Li Xuerui; 21–19, 21–16	(Germany) Juliane Schenk
February 27	German Open; Mülheim, Germany; Grand Prix Gold $125,000 – 64MS/32WS/32MD/32WD/32XD; Draw	(China) Hong Wei (China) Shen Ye; 21–19, 18–21, 21–19	(South Korea) Jung Jae-sung (South Korea) Lee Yong-dae
February 27	German Open; Mülheim, Germany; Grand Prix Gold $125,000 – 64MS/32WS/32MD/32WD/32XD; Draw	(China) Xia Huan (China) Tang Jinhua; 23–21, 21–13	(South Korea) Jung Kyung-eun (South Korea) Kim Ha-na
February 27	German Open; Mülheim, Germany; Grand Prix Gold $125,000 – 64MS/32WS/32MD/32WD/32XD; Draw	(Denmark) Thomas Laybourn (Denmark) Kamilla Rytter Juhl; 21–9, 21–16	(South Korea) Lee Yong-dae (South Korea) Ha Jung-eun

=== March ===
Week of	Tournament	Champions	Runners-up
March 5	All England Open; Birmingham, England; Super Series Premier $350,000 – 32MS/32WS/32MD/32WD/32XD; Draw	(China) Lin Dan; 21–19, 6–2 retired	(Malaysia) Lee Chong Wei
March 5	All England Open; Birmingham, England; Super Series Premier $350,000 – 32MS/32WS/32MD/32WD/32XD; Draw	(China) Li Xuerui; 21–13, 21–19	(China) Wang Yihan
March 5	All England Open; Birmingham, England; Super Series Premier $350,000 – 32MS/32WS/32MD/32WD/32XD; Draw	(South Korea) Jung Jae-sung (South Korea) Lee Yong-dae; 21–23, 21–9, 21–14	(China) Cai Yun (China) Fu Haifeng
March 5	All England Open; Birmingham, England; Super Series Premier $350,000 – 32MS/32WS/32MD/32WD/32XD; Draw	(China) Tian Qing (China) Zhao Yunlei; 21–17, 21–12	(China) Wang Xiaoli (China) Yu Yang
March 5	All England Open; Birmingham, England; Super Series Premier $350,000 – 32MS/32WS/32MD/32WD/32XD; Draw	(Indonesia) Tontowi Ahmad (Indonesia) Liliyana Natsir; 21–17, 21–19	(Denmark) Thomas Laybourn (Denmark) Kamilla Rytter Juhl
March 5	Croatian International; Zagreb, Croatia; International Series $5,000 – 32MS/32WS/32MD/32WD/32XD	(Germany) Lukas Schmidt; 21–18, 11–21, 21–19	(Denmark) Emil Holst
March 5	Croatian International; Zagreb, Croatia; International Series $5,000 – 32MS/32WS/32MD/32WD/32XD	(Japan) Kana Ito; 21–18, 21–15	(Turkey) Neslihan Yiğit
March 5	Croatian International; Zagreb, Croatia; International Series $5,000 – 32MS/32WS/32MD/32WD/32XD	(Netherlands) Jacco Arends (Netherlands) Jelle Maas; 21–16, 21–14	(Croatia) Zvonimir Đurkinjak (Croatia) Zvonimir Hölbling
March 5	Croatian International; Zagreb, Croatia; International Series $5,000 – 32MS/32WS/32MD/32WD/32XD	(Netherlands) Samantha Barning (Netherlands) Eefje Muskens; 21–18, 21–19	(Germany) Johanna Goliszewski (Germany) Carla Nelte
March 5	Croatian International; Zagreb, Croatia; International Series $5,000 – 32MS/32WS/32MD/32WD/32XD	(Netherlands) Jacco Arends (Netherlands) Ilse Vaessen; 22–20, 17–21, 21–16	(Croatia) Zvonimir Đurkinjak (Croatia) Staša Poznanović
March 12	Swiss Open; Basel, Switzerland; Grand Prix Gold $125,000 – 64MS/32WS/32MD/32WD/32XD; Draw	(China) Chen Jin; 14–21, 21–9, 21–17	(South Korea) Lee Hyun-il
March 12	Swiss Open; Basel, Switzerland; Grand Prix Gold $125,000 – 64MS/32WS/32MD/32WD/32XD; Draw	(India) Saina Nehwal; 21–19, 21–16	(China) Wang Shixian
March 12	Swiss Open; Basel, Switzerland; Grand Prix Gold $125,000 – 64MS/32WS/32MD/32WD/32XD; Draw	(Japan) Naoki Kawamae (Japan) Shoji Sato; 21–13, 21–14	(Chinese Taipei) Fang Chieh-min (Chinese Taipei) Lee Sheng-mu
March 12	Swiss Open; Basel, Switzerland; Grand Prix Gold $125,000 – 64MS/32WS/32MD/32WD/32XD; Draw	(China) Xia Huan (China) Tang Jinhua; 21–17, 21–10	(China) Bao Yixin (China) Zhong Qianxin
March 12	Swiss Open; Basel, Switzerland; Grand Prix Gold $125,000 – 64MS/32WS/32MD/32WD/32XD; Draw	(Indonesia) Tontowi Ahmad (Indonesia) Liliyana Natsir; 21–16, 21–14	(Thailand) Sudket Prapakamol (Thailand) Saralee Thungthongkam
March 12	Banuinvest International; Timișoara, Romania; International Series $5,000 – 32MS/32WS/32MD/32WD/32XD	(Germany) Marcel Reuter; 21–17, 21–17	(Slovenia) Iztok Utroša
March 12	Banuinvest International; Timișoara, Romania; International Series $5,000 – 32MS/32WS/32MD/32WD/32XD	(Japan) Kana Ito; 21–19, 21–12	(Japan) Ayumi Mine
March 12	Banuinvest International; Timișoara, Romania; International Series $5,000 – 32MS/32WS/32MD/32WD/32XD	(France) Laurent Constantin (France) Sébastien Vincent; 21–18, 20–22, 21–17	(Indonesia) Arya Maulana Aldiartama (Indonesia) Edi Subaktiar
March 12	Banuinvest International; Timișoara, Romania; International Series $5,000 – 32MS/32WS/32MD/32WD/32XD	(Denmark) Sandra-Maria Jensen (Denmark) Line Kjærsfeldt; 21–19, 17–21, 21–16	(Bulgaria) Gabriela Stoeva (Bulgaria) Stefani Stoeva
March 12	Banuinvest International; Timișoara, Romania; International Series $5,000 – 32MS/32WS/32MD/32WD/32XD	(Indonesia) Edi Subaktiar (Indonesia) Melati Daeva Oktavianti; 21–19, 21–18	(Austria) Roman Zirnwald (Austria) Elisabeth Baldauf
March 19	Giraldilla International; Pinar del Rio, Cuba; Future Series; 16MS/16WS/4MD/8WD/8XD	(Cuba) Osleni Guerrero; 21–17, 21–19	(Jamaica) Charles Pyne
March 19	Giraldilla International; Pinar del Rio, Cuba; Future Series; 16MS/16WS/4MD/8WD/8XD	(Peru) Christina Aicardi; 21–13, 15–21, 21–19	(Peru) Claudia Rivero
March 19	Giraldilla International; Pinar del Rio, Cuba; Future Series; 16MS/16WS/4MD/8WD/8XD	(Cuba) Ernesto Reyes (Cuba) Ronald Toledo; 21–16, 23–21	(Dominican Republic) William Cabrera (Dominican Republic) Freddy López
March 19	Giraldilla International; Pinar del Rio, Cuba; Future Series; 16MS/16WS/4MD/8WD/8XD	(Peru) Daniela Macías (Peru) Luz María Zornoza; 16–21, 21–19, 21–14	(Cuba) Mislenis Chaviano (Cuba) Maria L. Hernández
March 19	Giraldilla International; Pinar del Rio, Cuba; Future Series; 16MS/16WS/4MD/8WD/8XD	(Venezuela) Luis Camacho (Venezuela) Johanny Quintero; 21–18, 14–21, 21–13	(Cuba) Leodannis Martinez (Cuba) Grettel Labrada Casas
March 19	Polish Open; Wrocław, Poland; International Challenge $15,000 – 32MS/32WS/32MD/32WD/32XD	(Chinese Taipei) Hsu Jen-hao; 21–17, 21–10	(Ukraine) Dmytro Zavadsky
March 19	Polish Open; Wrocław, Poland; International Challenge $15,000 – 32MS/32WS/32MD/32WD/32XD	(Japan) Ai Goto; 21–9, 12–21, 21–7	(Turkey) Neslihan Yiğit
March 19	Polish Open; Wrocław, Poland; International Challenge $15,000 – 32MS/32WS/32MD/32WD/32XD	(Russia) Vladimir Ivanov (Russia) Ivan Sozonov; 21–11, 21–13	(Poland) Adam Cwalina (Poland) Michał Łogosz
March 19	Polish Open; Wrocław, Poland; International Challenge $15,000 – 32MS/32WS/32MD/32WD/32XD	(England) Mariana Agathangelou (England) Heather Olver; 21–12, 23–21	(United States) Eva Lee (United States) Paula Lynn Obañana
March 19	Polish Open; Wrocław, Poland; International Challenge $15,000 – 32MS/32WS/32MD/32WD/32XD	(England) Nathan Robertson (England) Jenny Wallwork; 21–15, 21–11	(England) Ben Stawski (England) Lauren Smith
March 26	Vietnam International; Hanoi, Vietnam; International Challenge $15,000 – 64MS/32WS/32MD/32WD/32XD	(Singapore) Derek Wong; 17–21, 22–20, 21–10	(Indonesia) Wisnu Yuli Prasetyo
March 26	Vietnam International; Hanoi, Vietnam; International Challenge $15,000 – 64MS/32WS/32MD/32WD/32XD	(Thailand) Nitchaon Jindapol; 17–21, 21–11, 21–19	(Japan) Ayumi Mine
March 26	Vietnam International; Hanoi, Vietnam; International Challenge $15,000 – 64MS/32WS/32MD/32WD/32XD	(Indonesia) Ricky Karanda Suwardi (Indonesia) Muhammad Ulinnuha; 21–12, 21–19	(Indonesia) Marcus Fernaldi Gideon (Indonesia) Agripina Prima Rahmanto Putra
March 26	Vietnam International; Hanoi, Vietnam; International Challenge $15,000 – 64MS/32WS/32MD/32WD/32XD	(Indonesia) Pia Zebadiah Bernadet (Indonesia) Rizki Amelia Pradipta; 21–10, 21–15	(Malaysia) Amelia Alicia Anscelly (Malaysia) Soong Fie Cho
March 26	Vietnam International; Hanoi, Vietnam; International Challenge $15,000 – 64MS/32WS/32MD/32WD/32XD	(Indonesia) Hafiz Faizal (Indonesia) Pia Zebadiah Bernadet; 11–21, 21–17, 21–17	(Singapore) Danny Bawa Chrisnanta (Singapore) Vanessa Neo
March 26	Finnish Open; Vantaa, Finland; International Challenge $15,000 – 32MS/32WS/32MD/32WD/32XD	(England) Rajiv Ouseph; 21–18, 16–21, 21–18	(Sweden) Henri Hurskainen
March 26	Finnish Open; Vantaa, Finland; International Challenge $15,000 – 32MS/32WS/32MD/32WD/32XD	(Netherlands) Yao Jie; 22–20, 21–19	(Canada) Michelle Li
March 26	Finnish Open; Vantaa, Finland; International Challenge $15,000 – 32MS/32WS/32MD/32WD/32XD	(Russia) Vladimir Ivanov (Russia) Ivan Sozonov; 21–10, 21–16	(Russia) Nikolaj Nikolaenko (Russia) Nikolai Ukk
March 26	Finnish Open; Vantaa, Finland; International Challenge $15,000 – 32MS/32WS/32MD/32WD/32XD	(Canada) Alex Bruce (Canada) Michelle Li; 21–19, 12–21, 21–16	(Malaysia) Chow Mei Kuan (Malaysia) Lee Meng Yean
March 26	Finnish Open; Vantaa, Finland; International Challenge $15,000 – 32MS/32WS/32MD/32WD/32XD	(England) Chris Adcock (Scotland) Imogen Bankier; 22–24, 21–12, 21–13	(Denmark) Anders Skaarup Rasmussen (Denmark) Sara Thygesen

=== April ===
Week of	Tournament	Champions	Runners-up
April 2	Australian Open; Sydney, Australia; Grand Prix Gold $120,000 – 64MS/32WS/32MD/32WD/32XD; Draw	(China) Chen Jin; 21–11, 21–12	(Vietnam) Nguyễn Tiến Minh
April 2	Australian Open; Sydney, Australia; Grand Prix Gold $120,000 – 64MS/32WS/32MD/32WD/32XD; Draw	(China) Han Li; 21–13, 21–14	(South Korea) Bae Yeon-ju
April 2	Australian Open; Sydney, Australia; Grand Prix Gold $120,000 – 64MS/32WS/32MD/32WD/32XD; Draw	(Indonesia) Markis Kido (Indonesia) Hendra Setiawan; 21–16, 21–15	(Chinese Taipei) Fang Chieh-min (Chinese Taipei) Lee Sheng-mu
April 2	Australian Open; Sydney, Australia; Grand Prix Gold $120,000 – 64MS/32WS/32MD/32WD/32XD; Draw	(China) Luo Ying (China) Luo Yu; 12-21, 21–18, 21–17	(Chinese Taipei) Cheng Wen-hsing (Chinese Taipei) Chien Yu-chin
April 2	Australian Open; Sydney, Australia; Grand Prix Gold $120,000 – 64MS/32WS/32MD/32WD/32XD; Draw	(Chinese Taipei) Chen Hung-ling (Chinese Taipei) Cheng Wen-hsing; 22–20, 12–21, 23–21	(Malaysia) Chan Peng Soon (Malaysia) Goh Liu Ying
April 2	Osaka International; Osaka, Japan; International Challenge $15,000 – 32MS/32WS/32MD/32WD/32XD	(Japan) Kazumasa Sakai; Walkover	(Japan) Kazushi Yamada
April 2	Osaka International; Osaka, Japan; International Challenge $15,000 – 32MS/32WS/32MD/32WD/32XD	(Japan) Sayaka Takahashi; 22–20, 21–19	(Japan) Yui Hashimoto
April 2	Osaka International; Osaka, Japan; International Challenge $15,000 – 32MS/32WS/32MD/32WD/32XD	(Japan) Takeshi Kamura (Japan) Keigo Sonoda; 21–17, 21–23, 21–18	(Indonesia) Marcus Fernaldi Gideon (Indonesia) Agripina Prima Rahmanto Putra
April 2	Osaka International; Osaka, Japan; International Challenge $15,000 – 32MS/32WS/32MD/32WD/32XD	(Japan) Rie Eto (Japan) Yu Wakita; 21–18, 21–12	(Japan) Naoko Fukuman (Japan) Kurumi Yonao
April 2	Osaka International; Osaka, Japan; International Challenge $15,000 – 32MS/32WS/32MD/32WD/32XD	(Indonesia) Riky Widianto (Indonesia) Richi Puspita Dili; 21–15, 21–19	(Japan) Takeshi Kamura (Japan) Yonemoto Koharu
April 2	French International; Orléans, France; International Series $5,000 – 32MS/32WS/32MD/16WD/32XD	(India) Anand Pawar; 21–16, 21–10	(Malaysia) Misbun Ramdan Misbun
April 2	French International; Orléans, France; International Series $5,000 – 32MS/32WS/32MD/16WD/32XD	(Netherlands) Judith Meulendijks; 21–12, 21–15	(Malaysia) Sannatasah Saniru
April 2	French International; Orléans, France; International Series $5,000 – 32MS/32WS/32MD/16WD/32XD	(Germany) Peter Käsbauer (Germany) Josche Zurwonne; 26-24, 17–21, 21–11	(Germany) Andreas Heinz (Germany) Max Schwenger
April 2	French International; Orléans, France; International Series $5,000 – 32MS/32WS/32MD/16WD/32XD	(Germany) Johanna Goliszewski (Netherlands) Judith Meulendijks; 21–13, 21–12	(Denmark) Louise Hansen (Denmark) Tinne Kruse
April 2	French International; Orléans, France; International Series $5,000 – 32MS/32WS/32MD/16WD/32XD	(Germany) Peter Käsbauer (Germany) Johanna Goliszewski; 21–12, 21–11	(Malaysia) Nelson Heg (Malaysia) Chow Mei Kuan
April 9	Peru International; Lima, Peru; International Challenge $15,000 – 32MS/32WS/16MD/16WD/32XD	(Malaysia) Tan Chun Seang; 21–15, 21–11	(Cuba) Osleni Guerrero
April 9	Peru International; Lima, Peru; International Challenge $15,000 – 32MS/32WS/16MD/16WD/32XD	(Canada) Michelle Li; 21–23, 21–14, 21–15	(Japan) Ai Goto
April 9	Peru International; Lima, Peru; International Challenge $15,000 – 32MS/32WS/16MD/16WD/32XD	(United States) Howard Bach (United States) Tony Gunawan; 13–21, 21–13, 21–9	(Canada) Adrian Liu (Canada) Derrick Ng
April 9	Peru International; Lima, Peru; International Challenge $15,000 – 32MS/32WS/16MD/16WD/32XD	(Canada) Alex Bruce (Canada) Michelle Li; 21–18, 21–18	(Canada) Nicole Grether (Canada) Charmaine Reid
April 9	Peru International; Lima, Peru; International Challenge $15,000 – 32MS/32WS/16MD/16WD/32XD	(Canada) Toby Ng (Canada) Grace Gao; 21–10, 21–15	(Canada) Derrick Ng (Canada) Alex Bruce
April 9	Dutch International; Wateringen, Netherland; International Challenge $15,000 – 32MS/32WS/32MD/32WD/32XD	(Indonesia) Andre Kurniawan Tedjono; Walkover	(India) Anand Pawar
April 9	Dutch International; Wateringen, Netherland; International Challenge $15,000 – 32MS/32WS/32MD/32WD/32XD	(Netherlands) Yao Jie; 19–21, 21–9, 21–12	(Malaysia) Soniia Cheah Su Ya
April 9	Dutch International; Wateringen, Netherland; International Challenge $15,000 – 32MS/32WS/32MD/32WD/32XD	(Malaysia) Nelson Heg (Malaysia) Teo Ee Yi; 19–21, 21–13, 21–9	(Netherlands) Jorrit de Ruiter (Netherlands) Dave Khodabux
April 9	Dutch International; Wateringen, Netherland; International Challenge $15,000 – 32MS/32WS/32MD/32WD/32XD	(Netherlands) Lotte Jonathans (Netherlands) Paulien van Dooremalen; 17–21, 21–19, 23–21	(Netherlands) Selena Piek (Netherlands) Iris Tabeling
April 9	Dutch International; Wateringen, Netherland; International Challenge $15,000 – 32MS/32WS/32MD/32WD/32XD	(Poland) Robert Mateusiak (Poland) Nadieżda Zięba; 21–10, 21–19	(Russia) Andrey Ashmarin (Russia) Anastasiya Panushkina
April 16	European Badminton Championships; Karlskrona, Sweden; Continental Championships; 64MS/64WS/64MD/64WD/64XD; Draw	(Germany) Marc Zwiebler; 21–15, 21–13	(Sweden) Henri Hurskainen
April 16	European Badminton Championships; Karlskrona, Sweden; Continental Championships; 64MS/64WS/64MD/64WD/64XD; Draw	(Denmark) Tine Baun; 21–19, 16–21, 21–19	(Germany) Juliane Schenk
April 16	European Badminton Championships; Karlskrona, Sweden; Continental Championships; 64MS/64WS/64MD/64WD/64XD; Draw	(Denmark) Mathias Boe (Denmark) Carsten Mogensen; 21–11,21–11	(Germany) Michael Fuchs (Germany) Oliver Roth
April 16	European Badminton Championships; Karlskrona, Sweden; Continental Championships; 64MS/64WS/64MD/64WD/64XD; Draw	(Denmark) Christinna Pedersen (Denmark) Kamilla Rytter Juhl; 21–17, 24–22	(Denmark) Line Damkjær Kruse (Denmark) Marie Røpke
April 16	European Badminton Championships; Karlskrona, Sweden; Continental Championships; 64MS/64WS/64MD/64WD/64XD; Draw	(Poland) Robert Mateusiak (Poland) Nadieżda Zięba; 21–12, 24–22	(Denmark) Mads Pieler Kolding (Denmark) Julie Houmann
April 16	Badminton Asia Championships; Qingdao, China; Continental Championships $200,000 – 64MS/32WS/32MD/32WD/32XD; Draw	(China) Chen Jin; 21–12, 21–18	(China) Du Pengyu
April 16	Badminton Asia Championships; Qingdao, China; Continental Championships $200,000 – 64MS/32WS/32MD/32WD/32XD; Draw	(China) Li Xuerui; 21–16, 16–21, 21–9	(China) Wang Yihan
April 16	Badminton Asia Championships; Qingdao, China; Continental Championships $200,000 – 64MS/32WS/32MD/32WD/32XD; Draw	(South Korea) Kim Sa-rang (South Korea) Kim Gi-jung; 21–12, 21–16	(Japan) Hiroyuki Endo (Japan) Kenichi Hayakawa
April 16	Badminton Asia Championships; Qingdao, China; Continental Championships $200,000 – 64MS/32WS/32MD/32WD/32XD; Draw	(China) Tian Qing (China) Zhao Yunlei; 21–14, 21–15	(China) Bao Yixin (China) Zhong Qianxin
April 16	Badminton Asia Championships; Qingdao, China; Continental Championships $200,000 – 64MS/32WS/32MD/32WD/32XD; Draw	(China) Zhang Nan (China) Zhao Yunlei; 21–13, 21–12	(China) Xu Chen (China) Ma Jin
April 16	Tahiti International; Punaauia, Tahiti; International Challenge $15,000 – 32MS/32WS/16MD/16WD/32XD	(Malaysia) Tan Chun Seang; 30–29, 21–8	(Israel) Misha Zilberman
April 16	Tahiti International; Punaauia, Tahiti; International Challenge $15,000 – 32MS/32WS/16MD/16WD/32XD	(Canada) Michelle Li; 21–8, 21–13	(Canada) Nicole Grether
April 16	Tahiti International; Punaauia, Tahiti; International Challenge $15,000 – 32MS/32WS/16MD/16WD/32XD	(Canada) Adrian Liu (Canada) Derrick Ng; 23–21, 21–13	(Australia) Ross Smith (Australia) Glenn Warfe
April 16	Tahiti International; Punaauia, Tahiti; International Challenge $15,000 – 32MS/32WS/16MD/16WD/32XD	(United States) Eva Lee (United States) Paula Lynn Obañana; 21–13, 21–12	(Canada) Alex Bruce (Canada) Michelle Li
April 16	Tahiti International; Punaauia, Tahiti; International Challenge $15,000 – 32MS/32WS/16MD/16WD/32XD	(Australia) Ross Smith (Australia) Renuga Veeran; 23–21, 21–14	(Canada) Derrick Ng (Canada) Alex Bruce
April 23	India Open; New Delhi, India; Super Series $200,000 – 32MS/32WS/32MD/32WD/32XD; Draw	(South Korea) Son Wan-ho; 21–18, 14–21, 21–19	(Malaysia) Lee Chong Wei
April 23	India Open; New Delhi, India; Super Series $200,000 – 32MS/32WS/32MD/32WD/32XD; Draw	(China) Li Xuerui; 14–21, 21–17, 21–8	(Germany) Juliane Schenk
April 23	India Open; New Delhi, India; Super Series $200,000 – 32MS/32WS/32MD/32WD/32XD; Draw	(Thailand) Bodin Isara (Thailand) Maneepong Jongjit; 21–17, 14–21, 21–14	(South Korea) Ko Sung-hyun (South Korea) Yoo Yeon-seong
April 23	India Open; New Delhi, India; Super Series $200,000 – 32MS/32WS/32MD/32WD/32XD; Draw	(South Korea) Jung Kyung-eun (South Korea) Kim Ha-na; 21–17, 21–18	(China) Bao Yixin (China) Zhong Qianxin
April 23	India Open; New Delhi, India; Super Series $200,000 – 32MS/32WS/32MD/32WD/32XD; Draw	(Indonesia) Tontowi Ahmad (Indonesia) Liliyana Natsir; 21–16, 12–21, 21–14	(Thailand) Sudket Prapakamol (Thailand) Saralee Thungthongkam
April 23	Portugal International; Caldas da Rainha, Portugal; International Series $5,000 – 32MS/32WS/32MD/16WD/32XD	(Germany) Dieter Domke; 21–16, 21–17	(Germany) Lukas Schmidt
April 23	Portugal International; Caldas da Rainha, Portugal; International Series $5,000 – 32MS/32WS/32MD/16WD/32XD	(Spain) Beatriz Corrales; 21–15, 21–15	(Bulgaria) Linda Zetchiri
April 23	Portugal International; Caldas da Rainha, Portugal; International Series $5,000 – 32MS/32WS/32MD/16WD/32XD	(Croatia) Zvonimir Đurkinjak (Denmark) Nikolaj Overgaard; 21–12, 22–20	(England) Marcus Ellis (Scotland) Paul van Rietvelde
April 23	Portugal International; Caldas da Rainha, Portugal; International Series $5,000 – 32MS/32WS/32MD/16WD/32XD	(England) Alexandra Langley (England) Gabrielle White; 21–11, 21–19	(England) Helena Lewczynska (England) Hayley Rogers
April 23	Portugal International; Caldas da Rainha, Portugal; International Series $5,000 – 32MS/32WS/32MD/16WD/32XD	(England) Marcus Ellis (England) Gabrielle White; 21–17, 15–21, 24–22	(Croatia) Zvonimir Đurkinjak (Croatia) Staša Poznanović

=== May ===
Week of	Tournament	Champions	Runners-up
May 1	Malaysia Masters; Johor Bahru, Malaysia; Grand Prix Gold $120,000 – 64MS/32WS/32MD/32WD/32XD; Draw	(Malaysia) Lee Chong Wei; 17–21, 21–8, 21–10	(Indonesia) Sony Dwi Kuncoro
May 1	Malaysia Masters; Johor Bahru, Malaysia; Grand Prix Gold $120,000 – 64MS/32WS/32MD/32WD/32XD; Draw	(Thailand) Busanan Ongbamrungphan; 21-17, 22-20	(Japan) Sayaka Takahashi
May 1	Malaysia Masters; Johor Bahru, Malaysia; Grand Prix Gold $120,000 – 64MS/32WS/32MD/32WD/32XD; Draw	(Malaysia) Koo Kien Keat (Malaysia) Tan Boon Heong; 21–15, 21–19	(Malaysia) Chooi Kah Ming (Malaysia) Ow Yao Han
May 1	Malaysia Masters; Johor Bahru, Malaysia; Grand Prix Gold $120,000 – 64MS/32WS/32MD/32WD/32XD; Draw	(Malaysia) Chin Eei Hui (Malaysia) Wong Pei Tty; 21–18, 21–18	(Singapore) Shinta Mulia Sari (Singapore) Yao Lei
May 1	Malaysia Masters; Johor Bahru, Malaysia; Grand Prix Gold $120,000 – 64MS/32WS/32MD/32WD/32XD; Draw	(Malaysia) Chan Peng Soon (Malaysia) Goh Liu Ying; 21–12, 21–14	(Indonesia) Irfan Fadhilah (Indonesia) Weni Anggraini
May 1	Smiling Fish International; Trang, Thailand; International Series $5,000 – 64MS/32WS/32MD/32WD/32XD	(Malaysia) Soong Joo Ven; 21–14, 17–21, 21–18	(Thailand) Khosit Phetpradab
May 1	Smiling Fish International; Trang, Thailand; International Series $5,000 – 64MS/32WS/32MD/32WD/32XD	(Malaysia) Florah Ng; 11-21, 21-15, 21-19	(Thailand) Alisa Sapniti
May 1	Smiling Fish International; Trang, Thailand; International Series $5,000 – 64MS/32WS/32MD/32WD/32XD	(Malaysia) Darren Isaac Devadass (Malaysia) Tai An Khang; 14–21, 21–14, 24–22	(Thailand) Siriwat Matayanumati (Thailand) Pusanawat Saisirivit
May 1	Smiling Fish International; Trang, Thailand; International Series $5,000 – 64MS/32WS/32MD/32WD/32XD	(Japan) Aya Shimozaki (Japan) Emi Moue; 21–11, 22–20	(Thailand) Wiranpatch Hongchookeat (Thailand) Puttita Supajirakul
May 1	Smiling Fish International; Trang, Thailand; International Series $5,000 – 64MS/32WS/32MD/32WD/32XD	(Malaysia) Wong Fai Yin (Malaysia) Shevon Jemie Lai; 21–13, 23–21	(Malaysia) Tan Wee Gieen (Malaysia) Chow Mei Kuan
May 1	Denmark International; Frederikshavn, Denmark; International Challenge $15,000 – 32MS/32WS/32MD/32WD/32XD	(Sweden) Henri Hurskainen; 21–14, 21–11	(Denmark) Rune Ulsing
May 1	Denmark International; Frederikshavn, Denmark; International Challenge $15,000 – 32MS/32WS/32MD/32WD/32XD	(Denmark) Sandra-Maria Jensen; 21–19, 21–18	(Denmark) Anna Thea Madsen
May 1	Denmark International; Frederikshavn, Denmark; International Challenge $15,000 – 32MS/32WS/32MD/32WD/32XD	(Denmark) Christian John Skovgaard (Denmark) Mads Pieler Kolding; 21–17, 21–10	(Denmark) Kasper Antonsen (Denmark) Rasmus Bonde
May 1	Denmark International; Frederikshavn, Denmark; International Challenge $15,000 – 32MS/32WS/32MD/32WD/32XD	(Denmark) Line Damkjær Kruse (Denmark) Marie Røpke; 21–18, 21–19	(England) Lauren Smith (England) Gabrielle White
May 1	Denmark International; Frederikshavn, Denmark; International Challenge $15,000 – 32MS/32WS/32MD/32WD/32XD	(Denmark) Mads Pieler Kolding (Denmark) Julie Houmann; 21–19, 21–9	(Denmark) Kim Astrup Sorensen (Denmark) Line Kjærsfeldt
May 7	Slovenia International; Medvode, Slovenia; International Series $5,000 – 32MS/32WS/16MD/32WD/16XD	(England) Andrew Smith; 21–18,21–17	(India) Mohit Kamat
May 7	Slovenia International; Medvode, Slovenia; International Series $5,000 – 32MS/32WS/16MD/32WD/16XD	(Switzerland) Nicole Schaller; 21–19, 21–14	(Germany) Carola Bott
May 7	Slovenia International; Medvode, Slovenia; International Series $5,000 – 32MS/32WS/16MD/32WD/16XD	(Croatia) Zvonimir Đurkinjak (Croatia) Zvonimir Hölbling; 17–21, 21–17, 21–12	(Germany) Andreas Heinz (Germany) Jones Ralfy Jansen
May 7	Slovenia International; Medvode, Slovenia; International Series $5,000 – 32MS/32WS/16MD/32WD/16XD	(Germany) Isabel Herttrich (Germany) Inken Wienefeld; 21–14, 13–21, 21–17	(Wales) Sarah Thomas (Wales) Carissa Turner
May 7	Slovenia International; Medvode, Slovenia; International Series $5,000 – 32MS/32WS/16MD/32WD/16XD	(Croatia) Zvonimir Đurkinjak (Croatia) Staša Poznanović; 21–9, 21–13	(Germany) Hannes Käsbauer (Germany) Kira Kattenbeck
May 14	Spanish Open; Madrid, Spain; International Challenge $15,000 – 32MS/32WS/32MD/32WD/32XD	(France) Brice Leverdez; 21–14, 22–24, 21–18	(Sweden) Gabriel Ulldahl
May 14	Spanish Open; Madrid, Spain; International Challenge $15,000 – 32MS/32WS/32MD/32WD/32XD	(Thailand) Salakjit Ponsana; 21–11, 13–21, 21–14	(Spain) Beatriz Corrales
May 14	Spanish Open; Madrid, Spain; International Challenge $15,000 – 32MS/32WS/32MD/32WD/32XD	(Netherlands) Jorrit de Ruiter (Netherlands) Dave Khodabux; 21–16, 21–23, 21–13	(Netherlands) Jacco Arends (Netherlands) Jelle Maas
May 14	Spanish Open; Madrid, Spain; International Challenge $15,000 – 32MS/32WS/32MD/32WD/32XD	(Russia) Tatjana Bibik (Russia) Anastasiia Chervyakova; 12–21, 21–16, 21–18	(England) Mariana Agathangelou (England) Alexandra Langley
May 14	Spanish Open; Madrid, Spain; International Challenge $15,000 – 32MS/32WS/32MD/32WD/32XD	(England) Marcus Ellis (England) Gabrielle White; 21–9, 21–13	(France) Ronan Labar (France) Émilie Lefel
May 21	Thomas and Uber Cups; Wuhan, China; 12 teams (TC)/12 teams (UC); Draw	China; 3–0	South Korea
May 21	Thomas and Uber Cups; Wuhan, China; 12 teams (TC)/12 teams (UC); Draw	China; 3–0	South Korea
May 21	Bulgaria Hebar Open; Pazardzhik, Bulgaria; International Series $5,000 – 32MS/32WS/32MD/8WD/32XD	(Malaysia) Tan Chun Seang; 14–21, 21–15, 21–10	(Austria) David Obernosterer
May 21	Bulgaria Hebar Open; Pazardzhik, Bulgaria; International Series $5,000 – 32MS/32WS/32MD/8WD/32XD	(Belarus) Alesia Zaitsava; 21–17, 18–21, 21–10	(Bulgaria) Stefani Stoeva
May 21	Bulgaria Hebar Open; Pazardzhik, Bulgaria; International Series $5,000 – 32MS/32WS/32MD/8WD/32XD	(Malaysia) Tan Chun Seang (Austria) Roman Zirnwald; 21–17, 17–21, 21–11	(France) Marin Baumann (France) Lucas Corvée
May 21	Bulgaria Hebar Open; Pazardzhik, Bulgaria; International Series $5,000 – 32MS/32WS/32MD/8WD/32XD	(Bulgaria) Gabriela Stoeva (Bulgaria) Stefani Stoeva; 15–21, 21–14, 21–11	(Bulgaria) Rumiana Ivanova (Bulgaria) Dimitria Popstoikova
May 21	Bulgaria Hebar Open; Pazardzhik, Bulgaria; International Series $5,000 – 32MS/32WS/32MD/8WD/32XD	(Austria) Roman Zirnwald (Austria) Elisabeth Baldauf; 21–14, 11–21, 21–19	(Bulgaria) Blagovest Kisyov (Bulgaria) Dimitria Popstoikova
May 28	European Club Championships; Pécs, Hungary; CC Team Championships; 19 teams	(Russia) Primorye; 4–2	(Denmark) Team Skælskør-Slagelse
May 28	Maldives International; Malé, Maldives; International Challenge $15,000 – 64MS/16WS/32MD/8WD/16XD	(India) Srikanth Kidambi; 13–21, 21–11, 21–16	(Malaysia) Zulfadli Zulkiffli
May 28	Maldives International; Malé, Maldives; International Challenge $15,000 – 64MS/16WS/32MD/8WD/16XD	(Japan) Sayaka Takahashi; 21–17 21–16	(Japan) Yu Wakita
May 28	Maldives International; Malé, Maldives; International Challenge $15,000 – 64MS/16WS/32MD/8WD/16XD	(Japan) Kazuya Itani (Japan) Tomoya Takashina; 22–20, 29–27	(Thailand) Suwat Phaisansomsuk (Thailand) Wasapon Uttamang
May 28	Maldives International; Malé, Maldives; International Challenge $15,000 – 64MS/16WS/32MD/8WD/16XD	(Japan) Naoko Fukuman (Japan) Kurumi Yonao; 21–18, 13–21, 23–21	(Japan) Rie Eto (Japan) Yu Wakita
May 28	Maldives International; Malé, Maldives; International Challenge $15,000 – 64MS/16WS/32MD/8WD/16XD	(Wales) Raj Popat (Indonesia) Devi Tika Permatasari; 21–17, 21–17	(Sri Lanka) Hasitha Chanaka (Sri Lanka) Kavidi Sirimannage

=== June ===
Week of	Tournament	Champions	Runners-up
June 4	Thailand Open; Bangkok, Thailand; Grand Prix Gold $120,000 – 64MS/32WS/32MD/32WD/32XD; Draw	(Indonesia) Sony Dwi Kuncoro; 21–17, 21-14	(China) Chen Yuekun
June 4	Thailand Open; Bangkok, Thailand; Grand Prix Gold $120,000 – 64MS/32WS/32MD/32WD/32XD; Draw	(India) Saina Nehwal; 19-21, 21-15, 21-10	(Thailand) Ratchanok Intanon
June 4	Thailand Open; Bangkok, Thailand; Grand Prix Gold $120,000 – 64MS/32WS/32MD/32WD/32XD; Draw	(China) Liu Xiaolong (China) Qiu Zihan; 21-18, 21-19	(Malaysia) Mohd Zakry Abdul Latif (Malaysia) Mohd Fairuzizuan Mohd Tazari
June 4	Thailand Open; Bangkok, Thailand; Grand Prix Gold $120,000 – 64MS/32WS/32MD/32WD/32XD; Draw	(Thailand) Narissapat Lam (Thailand) Saralee Thungthongkam; 21-15, 10-21, 21-13	(China) Cheng Shu (China) Pan Pan
June 4	Thailand Open; Bangkok, Thailand; Grand Prix Gold $120,000 – 64MS/32WS/32MD/32WD/32XD; Draw	(China) Tao Jiaming (China) Tang Jinhua; 21-14, 21-16	(Thailand) Sudket Prapakamol (Thailand) Saralee Thungthongkam
June 11	Indonesia Open; Jakarta, Indonesia; Super Series Premier $650,000 – 32MS/32WS/32MD/32WD/32XD; Draw	(Indonesia) Simon Santoso; 21-18, 13-21, 21-11	(China) Du Pengyu
June 11	Indonesia Open; Jakarta, Indonesia; Super Series Premier $650,000 – 32MS/32WS/32MD/32WD/32XD; Draw	(India) Saina Nehwal; 13-21, 22-20, 21-19	(China) Li Xuerui
June 11	Indonesia Open; Jakarta, Indonesia; Super Series Premier $650,000 – 32MS/32WS/32MD/32WD/32XD; Draw	(South Korea) Jung Jae-sung (South Korea) Lee Yong-dae; 23-21, 19-21, 21-11	(Denmark) Mathias Boe (Denmark) Carsten Mogensen
June 11	Indonesia Open; Jakarta, Indonesia; Super Series Premier $650,000 – 32MS/32WS/32MD/32WD/32XD; Draw	(China) Wang Xiaoli (China) Yu Yang; 17-21, 21-9, 21-16	(China) Tian Qing (China) Zhao Yunlei
June 11	Indonesia Open; Jakarta, Indonesia; Super Series Premier $650,000 – 32MS/32WS/32MD/32WD/32XD; Draw	(Thailand) Sudket Prapakamol (Thailand) Saralee Thoungthongkam; 21-17, 17-21, 21-13	(Indonesia) Tontowi Ahmad (Indonesia) Liliyana Natsir
June 11	Mauritius International; Beau-Bassin Rose-Hill, Mauritius; Future Series; 64MS/32WS/32MD/8WD/16XD	(Malaysia) Kuan Beng Hong; 21-11, 21-18	(Mauritius) Deeneshsing Baboolall
June 11	Mauritius International; Beau-Bassin Rose-Hill, Mauritius; Future Series; 64MS/32WS/32MD/8WD/16XD	(Mauritius) Shama Aboobakar; 18-21, 21-12, 21-17	(Seychelles) Cynthia Course
June 11	Mauritius International; Beau-Bassin Rose-Hill, Mauritius; Future Series; 64MS/32WS/32MD/8WD/16XD	(Malaysia) Gan Teik Chai (Malaysia) Ong Soon Hock; 21–9, 21-10	(Mauritius) Denneshsing Baboolall (Mauritius) Yoni Louison
June 11	Mauritius International; Beau-Bassin Rose-Hill, Mauritius; Future Series; 64MS/32WS/32MD/8WD/16XD	(Seychelles) Allisen Camille (Seychelles) Cynthia Course; 21-16, 21–14	(Mauritius) Shama Aboobakar (Mauritius) Shaama Sandooyeea
June 11	Mauritius International; Beau-Bassin Rose-Hill, Mauritius; Future Series; 64MS/32WS/32MD/8WD/16XD	(Seychelles) Georgie Cupidon (Seychelles) Cynthia Course; 21–19, 21-14	(Mauritius) Deeneshsing Baboolall (Mauritius) Shama Aboobakar
June 18	Singapore Open; Singapore; Super Series $200,000 – 32MS/32WS/32MD/32WD/32XD; Draw	(Thailand) Boonsak Ponsana; 21-18, 21-19	(China) Wang Zhengming
June 18	Singapore Open; Singapore; Super Series $200,000 – 32MS/32WS/32MD/32WD/32XD; Draw	(Germany) Juliane Schenk; 21-11, 26-24	(Chinese Taipei) Cheng Shao-chieh
June 18	Singapore Open; Singapore; Super Series $200,000 – 32MS/32WS/32MD/32WD/32XD; Draw	(Indonesia) Markis Kido (Indonesia) Hendra Setiawan; 22-20, 11-21, 21-6	(South Korea) Ko Sung-hyun (South Korea) Yoo Yeon-seong
June 18	Singapore Open; Singapore; Super Series $200,000 – 32MS/32WS/32MD/32WD/32XD; Draw	(China) Bao Yixin (China) Zhong Qianxin; 21-12, 21-17	(Chinese Taipei) Cheng Wen-hsing (Chinese Taipei) Chien Yu-chin
June 18	Singapore Open; Singapore; Super Series $200,000 – 32MS/32WS/32MD/32WD/32XD; Draw	(Chinese Taipei) Chen Hung-ling (Chinese Taipei) Cheng Wen-hsing; 21-17, 21-11	(Japan) Shintaro Ikeda (Japan) Reiko Shiota
June 18	Auckland International; Auckland, New Zealand; International Series $5,000 – 64MS/32WS/32MD/16WD/32XD	(Chinese Taipei) Lai Chien-cheng; 21–15, 21-13	(Chinese Taipei) Cheng Po-wei
June 18	Auckland International; Auckland, New Zealand; International Series $5,000 – 64MS/32WS/32MD/16WD/32XD	(Chinese Taipei) Chang Ya-lan; 21–15, 25-23	(Chinese Taipei) Cheng Yu-chieh
June 18	Auckland International; Auckland, New Zealand; International Series $5,000 – 64MS/32WS/32MD/16WD/32XD	(New Zealand) Kevin Dennerly-Minturn (New Zealand) Oliver Leydon-Davis; 21-18, 22-20	(England) Tom Armstrong (New Zealand) Tjitte Weistra
June 18	Auckland International; Auckland, New Zealand; International Series $5,000 – 64MS/32WS/32MD/16WD/32XD	(Indonesia) Keshya Nurvita Hanadia (Indonesia) Devi Tika Permatasari; 21–15, 21-18	(New Zealand) Amanda Brown (New Zealand) Kritteka Gregory
June 18	Auckland International; Auckland, New Zealand; International Series $5,000 – 64MS/32WS/32MD/16WD/32XD	(England) Tom Armstrong (England) Tracey Hallam; 21-11, 21-7	(Australia) Luke Chong (Australia) Victoria Na
June 25	Russian Open; Vladivostok, Russia; Grand Prix $50,000 – 32MS/32WS/16MD/16WD/16XD; Draw	(Japan) Kazumasa Sakai; 21-17, 21-17	(Russia) Vladimir Malkov
June 25	Russian Open; Vladivostok, Russia; Grand Prix $50,000 – 32MS/32WS/16MD/16WD/16XD; Draw	(Japan) Yui Hashimoto; 21-19, 21-12	(Japan) Shizuka Uchida
June 25	Russian Open; Vladivostok, Russia; Grand Prix $50,000 – 32MS/32WS/16MD/16WD/16XD; Draw	(Russia) Vladimir Ivanov (Russia) Ivan Sozonov; 21–18, 21–15	(Russia) Vitalij Durkin (Russia) Aleksandr Nikolaenko
June 25	Russian Open; Vladivostok, Russia; Grand Prix $50,000 – 32MS/32WS/16MD/16WD/16XD; Draw	(Russia) Valeria Sorokina (Russia) Nina Vislova; Walkover	(Russia) Tatjana Bibik (Russia) Anastasia Chervaykova
June 25	Russian Open; Vladivostok, Russia; Grand Prix $50,000 – 32MS/32WS/16MD/16WD/16XD; Draw	(Russia) Aleksandr Nikolaenko (Russia) Valeria Sorokina; 21–19, 21-17	(Russia) Vitalij Durkin (Russia) Nina Vislova
June 25	Victorian International; Victoria, Australia; International Series $5,000 – 64MS/32WS/32MD/16WD/32XD	(India) Anup Sridhar; 21–13,21-11	(England) Andrew Smith
June 25	Victorian International; Victoria, Australia; International Series $5,000 – 64MS/32WS/32MD/16WD/32XD	(Chinese Taipei) Tai Ching-chieh; 21-14, 21-13	(Chinese Taipei) Cheng Yu-chieh
June 25	Victorian International; Victoria, Australia; International Series $5,000 – 64MS/32WS/32MD/16WD/32XD	(Indonesia) Rangga Yave Rianto (Indonesia) Seiko Wahyu Kusdianto; 21-17, 21-14	(Chinese Taipei) Chiu Yu-hsiang (Chinese Taipei) Lai Chien-cheng
June 25	Victorian International; Victoria, Australia; International Series $5,000 – 64MS/32WS/32MD/16WD/32XD	(Indonesia) Keshya Nurvita Hanadia (Indonesia) Devi Tika Permatasari; 21-13, 21-11	(Australia) Leanne Choo (Australia) Renuga Veeran
June 25	Victorian International; Victoria, Australia; International Series $5,000 – 64MS/32WS/32MD/16WD/32XD	(Indonesia) Andika Anhar (Indonesia) Keshya Nurvita Hanadia; 21–17, 21-12	(Australia) Ross Smith (Australia) Renuga Veeran

=== July ===
Week of	Tournament	Champions	Runners-up
July 2	Indonesia International; Surabaya, Indonesia; International Challenge $15,000 – 64MS/32WS/32MD/32WD/32XD	(Indonesia) Alamsyah Yunus; 20-22, 21-16, 21-10	(Indonesia) Wisnu Yuli Prasetyo
July 2	Indonesia International; Surabaya, Indonesia; International Challenge $15,000 – 64MS/32WS/32MD/32WD/32XD	(Indonesia) Hera Desi; 21-16, 21-18	(South Korea) Bae Seung-hee
July 2	Indonesia International; Surabaya, Indonesia; International Challenge $15,000 – 64MS/32WS/32MD/32WD/32XD	(Indonesia) Ricky Karanda Suwardi (Indonesia) Muhammad Ulinnuha; 21-12, 12-21, 21-16	(Indonesia) Yonathan Suryatama Dasuki (Indonesia) Hendra Aprida Gunawan
July 2	Indonesia International; Surabaya, Indonesia; International Challenge $15,000 – 64MS/32WS/32MD/32WD/32XD	(Indonesia) Pia Zebadiah Bernadet (Indonesia) Rizki Amelia Pradipta; 21-17, 19-21, 21-13	(South Korea) Lee Se-rang (South Korea) Yoo Hyun-young
July 2	Indonesia International; Surabaya, Indonesia; International Challenge $15,000 – 64MS/32WS/32MD/32WD/32XD	(South Korea) Lee Jae-jin (South Korea) Yoo Hyun-young; 19-21, 21-13, 21-12	(Indonesia) Tri Kusmawardana (Indonesia) Aprilsasi Putri Lejarsar Variella
July 2	U.S. Open; Orange County, California, United States; Grand Prix Gold $120,000 – 64MS/32WS/32MD/32WD/32XD; Draw	(Russia) Vladimir Ivanov; 22-20, 21-17	(Japan) Takuma Ueda
July 2	U.S. Open; Orange County, California, United States; Grand Prix Gold $120,000 – 64MS/32WS/32MD/32WD/32XD; Draw	(Chinese Taipei) Pai Hsiao-ma; 21-17, 16-21, 21-11	(Japan) Kaori Imabeppu
July 2	U.S. Open; Orange County, California, United States; Grand Prix Gold $120,000 – 64MS/32WS/32MD/32WD/32XD; Draw	(Japan) Hiroyuki Endo (Japan) Kenichi Hayakawa; 21-15, 21-10	(Japan) Yoshiteru Hirobe (Japan) Kenta Kazuno
July 2	U.S. Open; Orange County, California, United States; Grand Prix Gold $120,000 – 64MS/32WS/32MD/32WD/32XD; Draw	(Japan) Misaki Matsutomo (Japan) Ayaka Takahashi; 21-19, 21-17	(Russia) Valeri Sorokina (Russia) Nina Vislova
July 2	U.S. Open; Orange County, California, United States; Grand Prix Gold $120,000 – 64MS/32WS/32MD/32WD/32XD; Draw	(United States) Tony Gunawan (Indonesia) Vita Marissa; 21-13, 21-10	(Japan) Kenichi Hayakawa (Japan) Misaki Matsutomo
July 2	White Nights; Gatchina, Russia; International Challenge $15,000 – 64MS/32WS/32MD/16WD/32XD	(Ukraine) Dmytro Zavadsky; 16-21, 21-15, 21-18	(Poland) Przemysław Wacha
July 2	White Nights; Gatchina, Russia; International Challenge $15,000 – 64MS/32WS/32MD/16WD/32XD	(Poland) Kamila Augustyn; 19-21, 21-14, 21-14	(Republic of Ireland) Chloe Magee
July 2	White Nights; Gatchina, Russia; International Challenge $15,000 – 64MS/32WS/32MD/16WD/32XD	(France) Baptiste Carême (France) Gaëtan Mittelheisser; 21–19, 21–19	(France) Ronan Labar (France) Mathias Quéré
July 2	White Nights; Gatchina, Russia; International Challenge $15,000 – 64MS/32WS/32MD/16WD/32XD	(Russia) Tatjana Bibik (Russia) Anastasia Chervyakova; Walkover	(Russia) Evgeniya Kosetskaya (Russia) Viktoriia Vorobeva
July 2	White Nights; Gatchina, Russia; International Challenge $15,000 – 64MS/32WS/32MD/16WD/32XD	(France) Baptiste Carême (France) Audrey Fontaine; 21-17, 21-10	(Poland) Wojciech Szkudlarczyk (Poland) Agnieszka Wojtkowska
July 9	Canada Open; Richmond, British Columbia, Canada; Grand Prix $50,000 – 64MS/32WS/32MD/16WD/32XD; Draw	(Chinese Taipei) Chou Tien-chen; 15-21, 21-16, 21-9	(Chinese Taipei) Lin Yu-hsien
July 9	Canada Open; Richmond, British Columbia, Canada; Grand Prix $50,000 – 64MS/32WS/32MD/16WD/32XD; Draw	(Japan) Nozomi Okuhara; 21–8, 21-16	(Japan) Sayaka Takahashi
July 9	Canada Open; Richmond, British Columbia, Canada; Grand Prix $50,000 – 64MS/32WS/32MD/16WD/32XD; Draw	(Japan) Takeshi Kamura (Japan) Keigo Sonoda; 12-21, 21-16, 21-19	(Japan) Hiroyuki Saeki (Japan) Ryota Taohata
July 9	Canada Open; Richmond, British Columbia, Canada; Grand Prix $50,000 – 64MS/32WS/32MD/16WD/32XD; Draw	(Japan) Misaki Matsutomo (Japan) Ayaka Takahashi; 21-15, 15-21, 21-12	(Japan) Yonemoto Koharu (Japan) Yuriko Miki
July 9	Canada Open; Richmond, British Columbia, Canada; Grand Prix $50,000 – 64MS/32WS/32MD/16WD/32XD; Draw	(Japan) Ryota Taohata (Japan) Ayaka Takahashi; 21-14, 21-16	(Japan) Takeshi Kamura (Japan) Yonemoto Koharu
July 16	European University Championships; Córdoba, Spain; Multi-sports events (University)	(Russia) N. I. Lobachevsky State University of Nizhny Novgorod; 3–2	(Germany) University of Duisburg-Essen
July 16	European University Championships; Córdoba, Spain; Multi-sports events (University)	(Russia) Vladimir Malkov; Saratov State University; 21-18, 21-10	(Germany) Lukas Schmidt; Saarland University
July 16	European University Championships; Córdoba, Spain; Multi-sports events (University)	(Russia) Anastasia Chervyakova; N. I. Lobachevsky State University of Nizhny Novgorod; 21-13, 21-9	(Turkey) Öznur Çalışkan; Uludağ University
July 16	European University Championships; Córdoba, Spain; Multi-sports events (University)	(Sweden) Sebastian Gransbo (Sweden) Peder Nordin; Stockholm University; 21-17, 21-10	(Russia) Mikhail Loktev (Russia) Vadim Novoselov; Saratov State University
July 16	European University Championships; Córdoba, Spain; Multi-sports events (University)	(Germany) Kim Buss (Germany) Inken Wienefeld; University of Duisburg-Essen; 21-12, 21-15	(Poland) Magdalena Jaworek (Poland) Aneta Walentukanis; University of Olsztyn
July 16	European University Championships; Córdoba, Spain; Multi-sports events (University)	(Germany) Alexander Roovers (Germany) Kim Buss; University of Duisburg-Essen; 21-17, 13-21, 21-18	(Russia) Stepan Yaroslavtsev (Russia) Anastasia Chervyakova; N. I. Lobachevsky State University of Nizhny Novgorod
July 30	Olympic Games; London, Great Britain; Multi-sport – 40MS/46WS/16MD/16WD/16XD; Draw	(China) Lin Dan; 15-21, 21-10, 19-21	(Malaysia) Lee Chong Wei
July 30	Olympic Games; London, Great Britain; Multi-sport – 40MS/46WS/16MD/16WD/16XD; Draw	(China) Li Xuerui; 21-15, 21-23, 21-17	(China) Wang Yihan
July 30	Olympic Games; London, Great Britain; Multi-sport – 40MS/46WS/16MD/16WD/16XD; Draw	(China) Cai Yun (China) Fu Haifeng; 21-16, 21-15	(Denmark) Mathias Boe (Denmark) Carsten Mogensen
July 30	Olympic Games; London, Great Britain; Multi-sport – 40MS/46WS/16MD/16WD/16XD; Draw	(China) Tian Qing (China) Zhao Yunlei; 21-10, 25-23	(Japan) Mizuki Fujii (Japan) Reika Kakiiwa
July 30	Olympic Games; London, Great Britain; Multi-sport – 40MS/46WS/16MD/16WD/16XD; Draw	(China) Zhang Nan (China) Zhao Yunlei; 21-11, 21-17	(China) Xu Chen (China) Ma Jin

=== August ===
Week of	Tournament	Champions	Runners-up
August 13	Singapore International; Singapore; International Series $5,000 – 64MS/32WS/32MD/32WD/32XD	(Thailand) Sitthikom Thammasin; 22-20, 8-21, 21-8	(Singapore) Ashton Chen
August 13	Singapore International; Singapore; International Series $5,000 – 64MS/32WS/32MD/32WD/32XD	(Singapore) Xing Aiying; 21-10, 21-8	(Singapore) Fu Mingtian
August 13	Singapore International; Singapore; International Series $5,000 – 64MS/32WS/32MD/32WD/32XD	(Chinese Taipei) Liang Jui-wei (Chinese Taipei) Liao Kuan-hao; 21-11, 21-15	(Chinese Taipei) Liao Chun-Chieh (Chinese Taipei) Lin Yen-Jui
August 13	Singapore International; Singapore; International Series $5,000 – 64MS/32WS/32MD/32WD/32XD	(Japan) Asumi Kugo (Japan) Megumi Yokoyama; 12-21, 21-16, 21-17	(Japan) Yuki Fukushima (Japan) Yui Miyauchi
August 13	Singapore International; Singapore; International Series $5,000 – 64MS/32WS/32MD/32WD/32XD	(Chinese Taipei) Tseng Min-hao (Chinese Taipei) Lai Chia-wen; 21-16, 21-14	(Singapore) Chayut Triyachart (Malaysia) Ng Hui Ern
August 20	Vietnam Open; Ho Chi Minh City, Vietnam; Grand Prix $50,000 – 64MS/32WS/32MD/32WD/32XD; Draw	(Vietnam) Nguyễn Tiến Minh; 21-14, 21-19	(Japan) Takuma Ueda
August 20	Vietnam Open; Ho Chi Minh City, Vietnam; Grand Prix $50,000 – 64MS/32WS/32MD/32WD/32XD; Draw	(Thailand) Porntip Buranaprasertsuk; 21-10, 21-18	(Indonesia) Lindaweni Fanetri
August 20	Vietnam Open; Ho Chi Minh City, Vietnam; Grand Prix $50,000 – 64MS/32WS/32MD/32WD/32XD; Draw	(Thailand) Bodin Isara (Thailand) Maneepong Jongjit; 19-21, 21-16, 21-11	(Indonesia) Yohanes Rendy Sugiarto (Indonesia) Afiat Yuris Wirawan
August 20	Vietnam Open; Ho Chi Minh City, Vietnam; Grand Prix $50,000 – 64MS/32WS/32MD/32WD/32XD; Draw	(Indonesia) Pia Zebadiah Bernadet (Indonesia) Rizki Amelia Pradipta; 21-17, 21-19	(Malaysia) Ng Hui Ern (Malaysia) Ng Hui Lin
August 20	Vietnam Open; Ho Chi Minh City, Vietnam; Grand Prix $50,000 – 64MS/32WS/32MD/32WD/32XD; Draw	(Indonesia) Markis Kido (Indonesia) Pia Zebadiah Bernadet; 23-21, 21-8	(Malaysia) Tan Aik Quan (Malaysia) Lai Pei Jing
August 20	Carebaco International; Santo Domingo, Dominican Republic; Future Series; 64MS/32WS/32MD/16WD/32XD	(New Zealand) Joe Wu; 21-19, 21-15	(Scotland) Alistair Casey
August 20	Carebaco International; Santo Domingo, Dominican Republic; Future Series; 64MS/32WS/32MD/16WD/32XD	(Canada) Nicole Grether; 21–7, 21–12	(Trinidad and Tobago) Solángel Guzmán
August 20	Carebaco International; Santo Domingo, Dominican Republic; Future Series; 64MS/32WS/32MD/16WD/32XD	(Guatemala) Rodolfo Ramírez (Guatemala) Jonathan Solís; 17-21, 21-7, 21-9	(Dominican Republic) William Cabrera (Dominican Republic) Freddy López
August 20	Carebaco International; Santo Domingo, Dominican Republic; Future Series; 64MS/32WS/32MD/16WD/32XD	(Canada) Nicole Grether (Canada) Charmaine Reid; 21-12, 21-11	(Trinidad and Tobago) Virginia Chariandy (Trinidad and Tobago) Solángel Guzmán
August 20	Carebaco International; Santo Domingo, Dominican Republic; Future Series; 64MS/32WS/32MD/16WD/32XD	(Dominican Republic) Nelson Javier (Dominican Republic) Berónica Vibieca; 11-21, 21-17, 21-13	(Suriname) Mitchel Wongsodikromo (Suriname) Crystal Leefmans
August 27	Polish International; Lubin, Poland; International Series $5,000 – 32MS/32WS/32MD/32WD/32XD	(Scotland) Kieran Merrilees; 21-10, 21-8	(England) Toby Penty
August 27	Polish International; Lubin, Poland; International Series $5,000 – 32MS/32WS/32MD/32WD/32XD	(Scotland) Kirsty Gilmour; 21-12, 21-12	(England) Riou Panuga
August 27	Polish International; Lubin, Poland; International Series $5,000 – 32MS/32WS/32MD/32WD/32XD	(Poland) Łukasz Moreń (Poland) Wojciech Szkudlarczyk; 21-13, 21-9	(Belgium) Matijs Dierickx (Belgium) Freek Golinski
August 27	Polish International; Lubin, Poland; International Series $5,000 – 32MS/32WS/32MD/32WD/32XD	(Poland) Kamila Augustyn (Poland) Agnieszka Wojtkowska; 21-15, 21-14	(Wales) Sarah Thomas (Wales) Carissa Turner
August 27	Polish International; Lubin, Poland; International Series $5,000 – 32MS/32WS/32MD/32WD/32XD	(England) Andrew Ellis (England) Jenny Wallwork; 21-13, 21-12	(Poland) Wojciech Szkudlarczyk (Poland) Agnieszka Wojtkowska
August 27	Venezuela International; Maracay, Venezuela; Future Series; 32MS/16WS/16MD/4WD/16XD	(Cuba) Osleni Guerrero; 21-17, 17-21, 21-15	(United States) Ilian Perez
August 27	Venezuela International; Maracay, Venezuela; Future Series; 32MS/16WS/16MD/4WD/16XD	(Trinidad and Tobago) Solángel Guzmán; 21–11, 21–8	(Chile) Camila Macaya
August 27	Venezuela International; Maracay, Venezuela; Future Series; 32MS/16WS/16MD/4WD/16XD	(Cuba) Osleni Guerrero (Cuba) Ronald Toledo; 18-21, 21-8, 21-8	(Guatemala) Rubén Castellanos (Guatemala) Adams Rodríguez
August 27	Venezuela International; Maracay, Venezuela; Future Series; 32MS/16WS/16MD/4WD/16XD	(Trinidad and Tobago) Virginia Chariandy (Trinidad and Tobago) Solángel Guzmán; 15-21, 21-17, 21-17	(Chile) Chou Ting Ting (Chile) Camila Macaya
August 27	Venezuela International; Maracay, Venezuela; Future Series; 32MS/16WS/16MD/4WD/16XD	(Trinidad and Tobago) Rahul Rampersad (Trinidad and Tobago) Solángel Guzmán; 23-21, 19-21, 22-20	(Spain) Oscar Martinez Salan (Spain) Maria Vijande

=== September ===
Week of	Tournament	Champions	Runners-up
September 3	Slovak Open; Prešov, Slovakia; Future Series; 32MS/32WS/32MD/16WD/16XD	(Slovenia) Iztok Utrosa; 21-9, 11-7 Retired	(Czech Republic) Jakub Bitman
September 3	Slovak Open; Prešov, Slovakia; Future Series; 32MS/32WS/32MD/16WD/16XD	(Belarus) Alesia Zaitsava; 21-17, 21-13	(Ukraine) Natalya Voytsekh
September 3	Slovak Open; Prešov, Slovakia; Future Series; 32MS/32WS/32MD/16WD/16XD	(Wales) Joe Morgan (Wales) Nic Strange; 21-9 21-17	(Belarus) Aleksei Konakh (Belarus) Yauheni Yakauchuk
September 3	Slovak Open; Prešov, Slovakia; Future Series; 32MS/32WS/32MD/16WD/16XD	(Ukraine) Yuliya Kazarinova (Ukraine) Yelyzaveta Zharka; 21-15, 20-22, 21-11	(Ukraine) Darya Samarchants (Ukraine) Anastasiya Dmytryshyn
September 3	Slovak Open; Prešov, Slovakia; Future Series; 32MS/32WS/32MD/16WD/16XD	(Czech Republic) Jakub Bitman (Czech Republic) Alzbeta Basova; 12-21, 21-17, 21-19	(Ukraine) Vitaly Konov (Ukraine) Yelyzaveta Zharka
September 10	China Masters; Changzhou, China; Superseries $400,000 – 32MS/32WS/32MD/8WD/16XD; Draw	(China) Chen Long; 21-11, 21-13	(Hong Kong) Hu Yun
September 10	China Masters; Changzhou, China; Superseries $400,000 – 32MS/32WS/32MD/8WD/16XD; Draw	(China) Wang Yihan; 21-18, 21-14	(China) Jiang Yanjiao
September 10	China Masters; Changzhou, China; Superseries $400,000 – 32MS/32WS/32MD/8WD/16XD; Draw	(China) Chai Biao (China) Zhang Nan; 21-18, 21-17	(Japan) Hiroyuki Endo (Japan) Kenichi Hayakawa
September 10	China Masters; Changzhou, China; Superseries $400,000 – 32MS/32WS/32MD/8WD/16XD; Draw	(China) Bao Yixin (China) Zhong Qianxin; 21–12, 21–15	(China) Cheng Shu (China) Luo Yu
September 10	China Masters; Changzhou, China; Superseries $400,000 – 32MS/32WS/32MD/8WD/16XD; Draw	(China) Xu Chen (China) Ma Jin; 14-21, 21-11, 21-10	(China) Qiu Zihan (China) Tang Jinhua
September 10	Guatemala International; Guatemala City, Guatemala; International Series $5,000 – 32MS/16WS/16MD/8WD/16XD	(Guatemala) Kevin Cordón; Walkover	(United States) Howard Shu
September 10	Guatemala International; Guatemala City, Guatemala; International Series $5,000 – 32MS/16WS/16MD/8WD/16XD	(Guatemala) Nikté Sotomayor; 21-16, 21-18	(Guatemala) Ana Lucia de Leon
September 10	Guatemala International; Guatemala City, Guatemala; International Series $5,000 – 32MS/16WS/16MD/8WD/16XD	(Guatemala) Jonathan Solis (Guatemala) Rodolfo Ramirez; 21-14, 16-21, 21-13	(Scotland) Alistair Casey (Mexico) Andres Quadri
September 10	Guatemala International; Guatemala City, Guatemala; International Series $5,000 – 32MS/16WS/16MD/8WD/16XD	(Guatemala) Ana Lucia de Leon (Guatemala) Nikté Sotomayor; 21–11, 21-8	(Guatemala) Melanie Braeuner (Guatemala) Adriana Cojulún
September 10	Guatemala International; Guatemala City, Guatemala; International Series $5,000 – 32MS/16WS/16MD/8WD/16XD	(Guatemala) Anibal Marroquin (Guatemala) Nikté Sotomayor; 13-21, 21-14, 21-19	(Guatemala) Jonathan Solis (Guatemala) Ana Lucia de Leon
September 10	Belgian International; Leuven, Belgium; International Challenge $15,000 – 32MS/32WS/32MD/32WD/32XD	(Indonesia) Andre Kurniawan Tedjono; 17-21, 21-8, 21-13	(Netherlands) Dicky Palyama
September 10	Belgian International; Leuven, Belgium; International Challenge $15,000 – 32MS/32WS/32MD/32WD/32XD	(France) Sashina Vignes Waran; 15-21, 24-22, 17-9 Retired	(Germany) Karin Schnaase
September 10	Belgian International; Leuven, Belgium; International Challenge $15,000 – 32MS/32WS/32MD/32WD/32XD	(Poland) Adam Cwalina (Netherlands) Koen Ridder; 21-18, 21-17	(England) Marcus Ellis (Scotland) Paul van Rietvelde
September 10	Belgian International; Leuven, Belgium; International Challenge $15,000 – 32MS/32WS/32MD/32WD/32XD	(Netherlands) Selena Piek (Netherlands) Iris Tabeling; 24-22, 21-18	(Germany) Johanna Goliszewski (Netherlands) Judith Meulendijks
September 10	Belgian International; Leuven, Belgium; International Challenge $15,000 – 32MS/32WS/32MD/32WD/32XD	(England) Marcus Ellis (England) Gabrielle White; 9-21, 21-10, 21-17	(England) Chris Langridge (England) Heather Olver
September 17	Japan Open; Tokyo, Japan; Super Series $200,000 – 32MS/32WS/32MD/32WD/32XD; Draw	(Malaysia) Lee Chong Wei; 21-18, 21-18	(Thailand) Boonsak Ponsana
September 17	Japan Open; Tokyo, Japan; Super Series $200,000 – 32MS/32WS/32MD/32WD/32XD; Draw	(Chinese Taipei) Tai Tzu-ying; 9-21, 21-9, 21-14	(Japan) Eriko Hirose
September 17	Japan Open; Tokyo, Japan; Super Series $200,000 – 32MS/32WS/32MD/32WD/32XD; Draw	(South Korea) Kim Gi-jung (South Korea) Kim Sa-rang; 21-16, 21-19	(Malaysia) Koo Kien Keat (Malaysia) Tan Boon Heong
September 17	Japan Open; Tokyo, Japan; Super Series $200,000 – 32MS/32WS/32MD/32WD/32XD; Draw	(Hong Kong) Poon Lok Yan (Hong Kong) Tse Ying Suet; 21-17, 22-20	(Japan) Shizuka Matsuo (Japan) Mami Naito
September 17	Japan Open; Tokyo, Japan; Super Series $200,000 – 32MS/32WS/32MD/32WD/32XD; Draw	(Malaysia) Chan Peng Soon (Malaysia) Goh Liu Ying; 21-12, 21-19	(Indonesia) Muhammad Rijal (Indonesia) Liliyana Natsir
September 17	Argentina International; Buenos Aires, Argentina; Future Series; 32MS/16WS/16MD/4WD/16XD	(New Zealand) Joe Wu; 21-11, 21-11	(Brazil) Italo Hauer
September 17	Argentina International; Buenos Aires, Argentina; Future Series; 32MS/16WS/16MD/4WD/16XD	(Chile) Chou Ting Ting; 21-15, 21-12	(Chile) Camila Macaya
September 17	Argentina International; Buenos Aires, Argentina; Future Series; 32MS/16WS/16MD/4WD/16XD	(Malaysia) Gan Teik Chai (Malaysia) Ong Soon Hock; 21-14, 21-15	(Chile) Cristian Araya (Chile) Esteban Mujica
September 17	Argentina International; Buenos Aires, Argentina; Future Series; 32MS/16WS/16MD/4WD/16XD	(Chile) Chou Ting Ting (Chile) Camila Macaya; 21-9, 21-6	(Argentina) Daiana Garmendia (Argentina) Celina Juarez
September 17	Argentina International; Buenos Aires, Argentina; Future Series; 32MS/16WS/16MD/4WD/16XD	(Chile) Esteban Mujica (Chile) Chou Ting Ting; 21-18, 17-21, 21-18	(Chile) Cristian Araya (Chile) Camila Macaya
September 17	Kharkiv International; Kharkiv, Ukraine; International Challenge $15,000 – 32MS/32WS/32MD/16WD/32XD	(Denmark) Emil Holst; 21-17, 21-8	(Ukraine) Vitaly Konov
September 17	Kharkiv International; Kharkiv, Ukraine; International Challenge $15,000 – 32MS/32WS/32MD/16WD/32XD	(Russia) Evgeniya Kosetskaya; 21-15, 21-18	(Russia) Olga Golovanova
September 17	Kharkiv International; Kharkiv, Ukraine; International Challenge $15,000 – 32MS/32WS/32MD/16WD/32XD	(France) Baptiste Careme (France) Gaetan Mittelheisser; 25-23, 21-10	(Sweden) Patrick Lundqvist (Sweden) Jonathan Nordh
September 17	Kharkiv International; Kharkiv, Ukraine; International Challenge $15,000 – 32MS/32WS/32MD/16WD/32XD	(France) Audrey Fontaine (France) Emilie Lefel; 21-11, 21-13	(Turkey) Ozge Bayrak (Turkey) Neslihan Yigit
September 17	Kharkiv International; Kharkiv, Ukraine; International Challenge $15,000 – 32MS/32WS/32MD/16WD/32XD	(Sweden) Nico Ruponen (Sweden) Amanda Högström; 23-21, 10-21, 21-16	(France) Gaetan Mittelheisser (France) Emilie Lefel
September 24	Indonesian Masters; Palembang Indonesia; Grand Prix Gold $120,000 – 64MS/32WS/32MD/32WD/32XD; Draw	(Indonesia) Sony Dwi Kuncoro; 21–11, 21–11	(Indonesia) Dionysius Hayom Rumbaka
September 24	Indonesian Masters; Palembang Indonesia; Grand Prix Gold $120,000 – 64MS/32WS/32MD/32WD/32XD; Draw	(China) Han Li; 21–12, 21-10	(Indonesia) Yeni Asmarani
September 24	Indonesian Masters; Palembang Indonesia; Grand Prix Gold $120,000 – 64MS/32WS/32MD/32WD/32XD; Draw	(South Korea) Kim Gi-jung (South Korea) Kim Sa-rang; 21-13, 21-9	(Indonesia) Angga Pratama (Indonesia) Rian Agung Saputro
September 24	Indonesian Masters; Palembang Indonesia; Grand Prix Gold $120,000 – 64MS/32WS/32MD/32WD/32XD; Draw	(Japan) Misaki Matsutomo (Japan) Ayaka Takahashi; 21-12, 12-21, 21-13	(South Korea) Eom Hye-won (South Korea) Jang Ye-na
September 24	Indonesian Masters; Palembang Indonesia; Grand Prix Gold $120,000 – 64MS/32WS/32MD/32WD/32XD; Draw	(Indonesia) Tontowi Ahmad (Indonesia) Liliyana Natsir; 21-19, 21-14	(Indonesia) Muhammad Rijal (Indonesia) Debby Susanto
September 24	Czech International; Brno, Czech Republic; International Challenge $15,000 – 32MS/32WS/32MD/32WD/32XD	(Denmark) Joachim Persson; 21-11, 21-10	(Denmark) Kim Bruun
September 24	Czech International; Brno, Czech Republic; International Challenge $15,000 – 32MS/32WS/32MD/32WD/32XD	(Scotland) Kirsty Gilmour; 21-18, 10-21, 21-13	(France) Sashina Vignes Waran
September 24	Czech International; Brno, Czech Republic; International Challenge $15,000 – 32MS/32WS/32MD/32WD/32XD	(England) Chris Langridge (England) Peter Mills; 21-14, 21-16	(England) Peter Briggs (England) Harley Towler
September 24	Czech International; Brno, Czech Republic; International Challenge $15,000 – 32MS/32WS/32MD/32WD/32XD	(England) Heather Olver (England) Kate Robertshaw; 21-16, 21-15	(Scotland) Jillie Cooper (Scotland) Kirsty Gilmour
September 24	Czech International; Brno, Czech Republic; International Challenge $15,000 – 32MS/32WS/32MD/32WD/32XD	(England) Chris Langridge (England) Heather Olver; 22-20, 6-7 Retired	(England) Marcus Ellis (England) Gabrielle White
September 24	Brazil International; São Paulo, Brazil; International Challenge $15,000 – 32MS/32WS/32MD/16WD/32XD	(Guatemala) Kevin Cordon; 17-21, 22-20, 21-19	(Sri Lanka) Niluka Karunaratne
September 24	Brazil International; São Paulo, Brazil; International Challenge $15,000 – 32MS/32WS/32MD/16WD/32XD	(Canada) Nicole Grether; 21-17, 21-15	(United States) Jamie Subandhi
September 24	Brazil International; São Paulo, Brazil; International Challenge $15,000 – 32MS/32WS/32MD/16WD/32XD	(Malaysia) Gan Teik Chai (Malaysia) Ong Soon Hock; 21-14, 21-14	(United States) Phillip Chew (United States) Sattawat Pongnairat
September 24	Brazil International; São Paulo, Brazil; International Challenge $15,000 – 32MS/32WS/32MD/16WD/32XD	(Canada) Nicole Grether (Canada) Charmaine Reid; 21-6, 21-15	(Peru) Camilla Garcia (Peru) Daniela Macias
September 24	Brazil International; São Paulo, Brazil; International Challenge $15,000 – 32MS/32WS/32MD/16WD/32XD	(United States) Phillip Chew (United States) Jamie Subandhi; 21-19, 21-16	(Brazil) Hugo Arthuso (Brazil) Fabiana Silva

=== October ===
Week of	Tournament	Champions	Runners-up
October 1	Chinese Taipei Open; Taipei, Chinese Taipei; Grand Prix Gold $200,000 – 64MS/32WS/32MD/32WD/32XD; Draw	(Vietnam) Nguyễn Tiến Minh; 21-11, 21-17	(Chinese Taipei) Chou Tien-chen
October 1	Chinese Taipei Open; Taipei, Chinese Taipei; Grand Prix Gold $200,000 – 64MS/32WS/32MD/32WD/32XD; Draw	(Chinese Taipei) Tai Tzu-ying; 21-19, 20-22, 22-20	(Indonesia) Lindaweni Fanetri
October 1	Chinese Taipei Open; Taipei, Chinese Taipei; Grand Prix Gold $200,000 – 64MS/32WS/32MD/32WD/32XD; Draw	(Malaysia) Mohd Zakry Abdul Latif (Malaysia) Mohd Fairuzizuan Mohd Tazari; 21-12, 21-14	(Indonesia) Angga Pratama (Indonesia) Rian Agung Saputro
October 1	Chinese Taipei Open; Taipei, Chinese Taipei; Grand Prix Gold $200,000 – 64MS/32WS/32MD/32WD/32XD; Draw	(Indonesia) Pia Zebadiah Bernadet (Indonesia) Rizki Amelia Pradipta; 21-15, 21-12	(Indonesia) Suci Rizky Andini (Indonesia) Della Destiara Haris
October 1	Chinese Taipei Open; Taipei, Chinese Taipei; Grand Prix Gold $200,000 – 64MS/32WS/32MD/32WD/32XD; Draw	(Indonesia) Muhammad Rijal (Indonesia) Debby Susanto; 21-14, 21-14	(Hong Kong) Lee Chun Hei (Hong Kong) Chau Hoi Wah
October 1	Bulgarian International; Sofia, Bulgaria; International Challenge $15,000 – 32MS/32WS/32MD/16WD/32XD	(Lithuania) Kęstutis Navickas; 22-20, 15-21, 21-13	(Austria) David Obernosterer
October 1	Bulgarian International; Sofia, Bulgaria; International Challenge $15,000 – 32MS/32WS/32MD/16WD/32XD	(Bulgaria) Petya Nedelcheva; 21-9, 21-18	(Bulgaria) Stefani Stoeva
October 1	Bulgarian International; Sofia, Bulgaria; International Challenge $15,000 – 32MS/32WS/32MD/16WD/32XD	(Scotland) Robert Blair (Malaysia) Tan Bin Shen; 21-10, 21-17	(Germany) Andreas Heinz (Germany) Max Schwenger
October 1	Bulgarian International; Sofia, Bulgaria; International Challenge $15,000 – 32MS/32WS/32MD/16WD/32XD	(Bulgaria) Gabriela Stoeva (Bulgaria) Stefani Stoeva; 21-9, 21-17	(Turkey) Özge Bayrak (Turkey) Neslihan Yiğit
October 1	Bulgarian International; Sofia, Bulgaria; International Challenge $15,000 – 32MS/32WS/32MD/16WD/32XD	(Germany) Michael Fuchs (Germany) Birgit Michels; 21-9, 21-13	(Germany) Peter Käsbauer (Germany) Isabel Herttrich
October 8	Pan Am Team Championships; Lima, Peru; Continental Championships; 7 teams	Canada; 3–1	United States
October 8	Dutch Open; Almere, Netherlands; Grand Prix $50,000 – 64MS/32WS/32MD/32WD/32XD; Draw	(Netherlands) Eric Pang; 21–14, 21–10	(Netherlands) Dicky Palyama
October 8	Dutch Open; Almere, Netherlands; Grand Prix $50,000 – 64MS/32WS/32MD/32WD/32XD; Draw	(Czech Republic) Kristína Gavnholt; 14-21, 21-13, 21-17	(Netherlands) Judith Meulendijks
October 8	Dutch Open; Almere, Netherlands; Grand Prix $50,000 – 64MS/32WS/32MD/32WD/32XD; Draw	(Indonesia) Markis Kido (Indonesia) Alvent Yulianto; 18-21, 21-13, 21-14	(Malaysia) Gan Teik Chai (Malaysia) Ong Soon Hock
October 8	Dutch Open; Almere, Netherlands; Grand Prix $50,000 – 64MS/32WS/32MD/32WD/32XD; Draw	(Netherlands) Selena Piek (Netherlands) Iris Tabeling; 19-21, 21-16, 22-20	(Netherlands) Samantha Barning (Netherlands) Eefje Muskens
October 8	Dutch Open; Almere, Netherlands; Grand Prix $50,000 – 64MS/32WS/32MD/32WD/32XD; Draw	(Denmark) Mads Pieler Kolding (Denmark) Kamilla Rytter Juhl; 21–15, 21-13	(England) Marcus Ellis (England) Gabrielle White
October 8	Irish International; Dublin, Ireland; Future Series; 32MS/32WS/32MD/8WD/16XD	(Sweden) Mattias Wigardt; 21-8, 21-9	(France) Maxime Michel
October 8	Irish International; Dublin, Ireland; Future Series; 32MS/32WS/32MD/8WD/16XD	(France) Perrine Le Buhanic; 21–17, 21-17	(Republic of Ireland) Sinead Chambers
October 8	Irish International; Dublin, Ireland; Future Series; 32MS/32WS/32MD/8WD/16XD	(Wales) Daniel Font (Wales) Oliver Gwilt; 12-21, 26-24, 21-16	(Scotland) Martin Campbell (Scotland) Angus Gilmour
October 8	Irish International; Dublin, Ireland; Future Series; 32MS/32WS/32MD/8WD/16XD	(Republic of Ireland) Sinead Chambers (Republic of Ireland) Jennie King; 21-18, 21-14	(Republic of Ireland) Rachael Darragh (Republic of Ireland) Alannah Stephenson
October 8	Irish International; Dublin, Ireland; Future Series; 32MS/32WS/32MD/8WD/16XD	(Republic of Ireland) Edward Cousins (Republic of Ireland) Keelin Fox; 21-17, 21-14	(Republic of Ireland) Stuart Lightbody (Republic of Ireland) Caroline Black
October 8	Pan Am Badminton Championships; Lima, Peru; Continental Championships; 64MS/32WS/16MD/16WD/32XD	(Guatemala) Kevin Cordón; 22-20, 21-10	(Cuba) Osleni Guerrero
October 8	Pan Am Badminton Championships; Lima, Peru; Continental Championships; 64MS/32WS/16MD/16WD/32XD	(Canada) Christin Tsai; 21-16, 21-19	(United States) Jamie Subandhi
October 8	Pan Am Badminton Championships; Lima, Peru; Continental Championships; 64MS/32WS/16MD/16WD/32XD	(Canada) Adrian Liu (Canada) Derrick Ng; 21-9, 21-9	(Brazil) Daniel Paiola (Brazil) Alex Yuwan Tjong
October 8	Pan Am Badminton Championships; Lima, Peru; Continental Championships; 64MS/32WS/16MD/16WD/32XD	(Canada) Alex Bruce (Canada) Phyllis Chan; 17-21, 21-17, 21-12	(Canada) Joycelyn Ko (Canada) Christin Tsai
October 8	Pan Am Badminton Championships; Lima, Peru; Continental Championships; 64MS/32WS/16MD/16WD/32XD	(Canada) Derrick Ng (Canada) Alex Bruce; 21-5, 21-6	(Canada) Phillipe Charron (Canada) Phyllis Chan
October 8	Ethiopia International; Addis Ababa, Ethiopia; Future Series; 32MS/32WS/16MD/16WD/16XD	(Czech Republic) Jan Fröhlich; 21-10, 21-4	(Ethiopia) Asnake Getachew Sahilu
October 8	Ethiopia International; Addis Ababa, Ethiopia; Future Series; 32MS/32WS/16MD/16WD/16XD	(Uganda) Shamim Bangi; 21-15, 19-21, 21-19	(Mauritius) Shama Aboobakar
October 8	Ethiopia International; Addis Ababa, Ethiopia; Future Series; 32MS/32WS/16MD/16WD/16XD	(Ethiopia) Teera Reta (Ethiopia) Asnake Getachew Sahilu; 21-14, 21-19	(Ethiopia) Ermiyas Tamrat Degefe (Ethiopia) Mekonen Gebrelu
October 8	Ethiopia International; Addis Ababa, Ethiopia; Future Series; 32MS/32WS/16MD/16WD/16XD	(Ethiopia) Firehiwot Getachew (Ethiopia) Yerusksew Legssey Tura; 21-23, 21-12, 21-17	(Ethiopia) Mahlet Daniel (Ethiopia) Samrawit Berhanu
October 8	Ethiopia International; Addis Ababa, Ethiopia; Future Series; 32MS/32WS/16MD/16WD/16XD	(Ethiopia) Asnake Getachew Sahilu (Ethiopia) Ayelech Yakob; 21-8, 25-23	(Ethiopia) Teera Reta (Ethiopia) Firehiwot Getachew
October 15	Denmark Open; Odense, Denmark; Super Series Premier $400,000 – 32MS/32WS/32MD/32WD/32XD; Draw	(Malaysia) Lee Chong Wei; 15-21, 21-12, 21-19	(China) Du Pengyu
October 15	Denmark Open; Odense, Denmark; Super Series Premier $400,000 – 32MS/32WS/32MD/32WD/32XD; Draw	(India) Saina Nehwal; 21-17, 21-8	(Germany) Juliane Schenk
October 15	Denmark Open; Odense, Denmark; Super Series Premier $400,000 – 32MS/32WS/32MD/32WD/32XD; Draw	(South Korea) Shin Baek-choel (South Korea) Yoo Yeon-seong; 19-21, 21-11, 21-19	(Malaysia) Koo Kien Keat (Malaysia) Tan Boon Heong
October 15	Denmark Open; Odense, Denmark; Super Series Premier $400,000 – 32MS/32WS/32MD/32WD/32XD; Draw	(China) Ma Jin (China) Tang Jinhua; 21-8, 21-12	(Japan) Misaki Matsutomo (Japan) Ayaka Takahashi
October 15	Denmark Open; Odense, Denmark; Super Series Premier $400,000 – 32MS/32WS/32MD/32WD/32XD; Draw	(China) Xu Chen (China) Ma Jin; 23-21, 24-26, 21-11	(Indonesia) Tontowi Ahmad (Indonesia) Liliyana Natsir
October 15	Swiss International; Yverdon-les-Bains, Switzerland; International Challenge $15,000 – 32MS/32WS/32MD/32WD/32XD	(Germany) Dieter Domke; 21-14, 20-22, 21-18	(England) Toby Penty
October 15	Swiss International; Yverdon-les-Bains, Switzerland; International Challenge $15,000 – 32MS/32WS/32MD/32WD/32XD	(Scotland) Kirsty Gilmour; 24-22, 21-17	(Indonesia) Millicent Wiranto
October 15	Swiss International; Yverdon-les-Bains, Switzerland; International Challenge $15,000 – 32MS/32WS/32MD/32WD/32XD	(Poland) Adam Cwalina (Poland) Przemysław Wacha; 23-21, 21-14	(England) Christopher Coles (England) Matthew Nottingham
October 15	Swiss International; Yverdon-les-Bains, Switzerland; International Challenge $15,000 – 32MS/32WS/32MD/32WD/32XD	(England) Heather Olver (England) Kate Robertshaw; 21-15, 15-21, 23-21	(Germany) Isabel Herttrich (Germany) Carla Nelte
October 15	Swiss International; Yverdon-les-Bains, Switzerland; International Challenge $15,000 – 32MS/32WS/32MD/32WD/32XD	(Germany) Peter Käsbauer (Germany) Isabel Herttrich; 21-18, 21-12	(England) Ben Stawski (England) Alyssa Lim
October 15	Iraq International; Erbil, Iraq; International Series $5,000 – 32MS/32WS/16MD/8WD/16XD	(Turkey) Emre Lale; 21-17, 22-20	(India) Subhankar Dey
October 15	Iraq International; Erbil, Iraq; International Series $5,000 – 32MS/32WS/16MD/8WD/16XD	(Turkey) Neslihan Kılıç; 19-21, 21-11, 21-13	(Iran) Negin Amiripour
October 15	Iraq International; Erbil, Iraq; International Series $5,000 – 32MS/32WS/16MD/8WD/16XD	(Turkey) Emre Aslan (Turkey) Hüseyin Oruç; 21–15, 23-21	(Turkey) Ramazan Öztürk (Turkey) Emre Vural
October 15	Iraq International; Erbil, Iraq; International Series $5,000 – 32MS/32WS/16MD/8WD/16XD	(Iran) Yosra Beigi (Iran) Sorayya Aghaei; 21-16, 21-11	(Iran) Sahabeh Fard (Iran) Niki Torfinezhad
October 15	Iraq International; Erbil, Iraq; International Series $5,000 – 32MS/32WS/16MD/8WD/16XD	(Syria) Amar Awad (Syria) Sanaa Mahmoud; 21-17, 21-14	(Jordan) Noubani Ehab Nidal (Jordan) Dima Issam Alardah
October 22	French Open; Paris, France; Super Series $200,000 – 32MS/32WS/32MD/32WD/32XD; Draw	(Malaysia) Liew Daren; 21-18, 21-17	(Denmark) Viktor Axelsen
October 22	French Open; Paris, France; Super Series $200,000 – 32MS/32WS/32MD/32WD/32XD; Draw	(Japan) Minatsu Mitani; 21-19, 21-11	(India) Saina Nehwal
October 22	French Open; Paris, France; Super Series $200,000 – 32MS/32WS/32MD/32WD/32XD; Draw	(South Korea) Ko Sung-hyun (South Korea) Lee Yong-dae; 22-24, 21-17, 21-11	(Thailand) Bodin Isara (Thailand) Maneepong Jongjit
October 22	French Open; Paris, France; Super Series $200,000 – 32MS/32WS/32MD/32WD/32XD; Draw	(China) Ma Jin (China) Tang Jinhua; 21-12, 23-21	(Denmark) Christinna Pedersen (Denmark) Kamilla Rytter Juhl
October 22	French Open; Paris, France; Super Series $200,000 – 32MS/32WS/32MD/32WD/32XD; Draw	(China) Xu Chen (China) Ma Jin; 21-17, 19-21, 21-18	(China) Qiu Zihan (China) Bao Yixin
October 22	BWF World Junior Championships; Chiba, Japan; Suhandinata & EYE Level Cup; 128MS/128WS/64MD/64WD/128XD; Draw	(China) China; 3–2	Japan
October 22	BWF World Junior Championships; Chiba, Japan; Suhandinata & EYE Level Cup; 128MS/128WS/64MD/64WD/128XD; Draw	(Japan) Kento Momota; 21-17, 19-21, 21-19	(China) Xue Song
October 22	BWF World Junior Championships; Chiba, Japan; Suhandinata & EYE Level Cup; 128MS/128WS/64MD/64WD/128XD; Draw	(Japan) Nozomi Okuhara; 21-12, 21-9	(Japan) Akane Yamaguchi
October 22	BWF World Junior Championships; Chiba, Japan; Suhandinata & EYE Level Cup; 128MS/128WS/64MD/64WD/128XD; Draw	(Hong Kong) Lee Chun Hei (Hong Kong) Ng Ka Long; 21-16, 21-17	(Japan) Takuto Inoue (Japan) Yuki Kaneko
October 22	BWF World Junior Championships; Chiba, Japan; Suhandinata & EYE Level Cup; 128MS/128WS/64MD/64WD/128XD; Draw	(South Korea) Lee So-hee (South Korea) Shin Seung-chan; 21-14, 18-21, 21-18	(China) Huang Yaqiong (China) Yu Xiaohan
October 22	BWF World Junior Championships; Chiba, Japan; Suhandinata & EYE Level Cup; 128MS/128WS/64MD/64WD/128XD; Draw	(Indonesia) Edi Subaktiar (Indonesia) Melati Daeva Oktavianti; 21-17, 21-13	(Indonesia) Alfian Eko Prasetya (Indonesia) Shella Devi Aulia
October 29	Bitburger Open; Saarbrücken, Germany; Grand Prix Gold $120,000 – 64MS/32WS/32MD/32WD/32XD; Draw	(Chinese Taipei) Chou Tien-chen; 21-19, 21-12	(Germany) Marc Zwiebler
October 29	Bitburger Open; Saarbrücken, Germany; Grand Prix Gold $120,000 – 64MS/32WS/32MD/32WD/32XD; Draw	(Germany) Juliane Schenk; 21-10, 15-21, 25-23	(Netherlands) Yao Jie
October 29	Bitburger Open; Saarbrücken, Germany; Grand Prix Gold $120,000 – 64MS/32WS/32MD/32WD/32XD; Draw	(Germany) Ingo Kindervater (Germany) Johannes Schöttler; 21–15, 21–11	(England) Chris Langridge (England) Peter Mills
October 29	Bitburger Open; Saarbrücken, Germany; Grand Prix Gold $120,000 – 64MS/32WS/32MD/32WD/32XD; Draw	(Macau) Wang Rong (Macau) Zhang Zhibo; 21-15, 21–13	(Germany) Johanna Goliszewski (Germany) Birgit Michels
October 29	Bitburger Open; Saarbrücken, Germany; Grand Prix Gold $120,000 – 64MS/32WS/32MD/32WD/32XD; Draw	(Denmark) Anders Kristiansen (Denmark) Julie Houmann; 21–11, 21–16	(Poland) Robert Mateusiak (Poland) Nadieżda Zięba
October 29	Miami International; Miami Lakes, United States; International Series $5,000 – 64MS/16WS/16MD/16WD/16XD	(Malaysia) Lim Fang Yang; 21-19, 21-18	(United States) Sattawat Pongnairat
October 29	Miami International; Miami Lakes, United States; International Series $5,000 – 64MS/16WS/16MD/16WD/16XD	(United States) Jamie Subandhi; 21-13, 21-11	(France) Perrine Le Buhanic
October 29	Miami International; Miami Lakes, United States; International Series $5,000 – 64MS/16WS/16MD/16WD/16XD	(France) Laurent Constantin (France) Florent Riancho; 21-7, 21-16	(Dominican Republic) William Cabrera (Dominican Republic) Nelson Javier
October 29	Miami International; Miami Lakes, United States; International Series $5,000 – 64MS/16WS/16MD/16WD/16XD	(France) Perrine Le Buhanic (France) Andréa Vanderstukken; 21-15, 21-5	(Suriname) Crystal Leefmans (Suriname) Priscila Tjitrodipo
October 29	Miami International; Miami Lakes, United States; International Series $5,000 – 64MS/16WS/16MD/16WD/16XD	(France) Laurent Constantin (France) Andréa Vanderstukken; 23-21, 21-14	(Suriname) Mitchel Wongsodikromo (Suriname) Crystal Leefmans

=== November ===
Week of	Tournament	Champions	Runners-up
November 1	Hungarian International; Budapest, Hungary; International Series $5,000 – 32MS/32WS/32MD/32WD/32XD	(Russia) Vladimir Malkov; 21-9, 21-10	(France) Inoki Theopilus
November 1	Hungarian International; Budapest, Hungary; International Series $5,000 – 32MS/32WS/32MD/32WD/32XD	(Ukraine) Marija Ulitina; 21-11, 17-21, 21-16	(Russia) Olga Golovanova
November 1	Hungarian International; Budapest, Hungary; International Series $5,000 – 32MS/32WS/32MD/32WD/32XD	(Netherlands) Ruud Bosch (Netherlands) Jim Middelburg; 17-21, 21-19, 21-16	(Croatia) Zvonimir Durkinjak (Croatia) Zvonimir Hoelbling
November 1	Hungarian International; Budapest, Hungary; International Series $5,000 – 32MS/32WS/32MD/32WD/32XD	(Germany) Carola Bott (Croatia) Stasa Poznanovic; 21-17, 23-21	(Denmark) Julie Finne-Ipsen (Denmark) Rikke S. Hansen
November 1	Hungarian International; Budapest, Hungary; International Series $5,000 – 32MS/32WS/32MD/32WD/32XD	(Croatia) Zvonimir Durkinjak (Croatia) Stasa Poznanovic; 21-16, 21-18	(Czech Republic) Jakub Bitman (Czech Republic) Alzbeta Basova
November 5	Bahrain International; Manama, Bahrain; International Challenge $15,000 – 32MS/32WS/32MD/16WD/16XD	(India) B. Sai Praneeth; 14-21, 21-14, 21-17	(Sri Lanka) Niluka Karunaratne
November 5	Bahrain International; Manama, Bahrain; International Challenge $15,000 – 32MS/32WS/32MD/16WD/16XD	(India) Arundhati Pantawane; 20-22, 21-12, 21-19	(India) Tanvi Lad
November 5	Bahrain International; Manama, Bahrain; International Challenge $15,000 – 32MS/32WS/32MD/16WD/16XD	(India) K. T. Rupesh Kumar (India) Sanave Thomas; 21-18, 19-21, 21-18	(India) K. Nandagopal (India) Jishnu Sanyal
November 5	Bahrain International; Manama, Bahrain; International Challenge $15,000 – 32MS/32WS/32MD/16WD/16XD	(Thailand) Rodjana Chuthabunditkul (Thailand) Chanida Julrattanamanee; 21-14, 21-18	(Thailand) Pacharakamol Arkornsakul (Thailand) Jongkonphan Kittiharakul
November 5	Bahrain International; Manama, Bahrain; International Challenge $15,000 – 32MS/32WS/32MD/16WD/16XD	(India) Tanveer Gill (India) Mohita Sahdev; 21-11, 17-21, 21-14	(Bahrain) Heri Setiawan (Bahrain) Rehana Sunder
November 5	World University Badminton Championship; Gwangju, South Korea (University)	(South Korea) South Korea; 3-0	China
November 5	World University Badminton Championship; Gwangju, South Korea (University)	(China) Wen Kai; 21-13 Retired	(Spain) Pablo Abian
November 5	World University Badminton Championship; Gwangju, South Korea (University)	(Chinese Taipei) Tai Tzu-ying; 21-12, 20-22, 21-12	(Chinese Taipei) Pai Hsiao-Ma
November 5	World University Badminton Championship; Gwangju, South Korea (University)	(South Korea) Kim Gi-jung (South Korea) Lee Yong-dae; 21-18, 21-16	(Chinese Taipei) Chen Chung-Jen (Chinese Taipei) Lin Yen-Jui
November 5	World University Badminton Championship; Gwangju, South Korea (University)	(Japan) Miri Ichimaru (Japan) Shiho Tanaka; 22-20, 21-11	(Chinese Taipei) Tai Tzu-ying (Chinese Taipei) Pai Hsiao-Ma
November 5	World University Badminton Championship; Gwangju, South Korea (University)	(South Korea) Kim Gi-jung (South Korea) Kim So-young; 20-22, 21-19, 21-17	(South Korea) Kang Ji-wook (South Korea) Kim Chan-mi
November 5	Iceland International; Reykjavík, Iceland; International Series $5,000 – 32MS/32WS/16MD/16WD/16XD	(Chinese Taipei) Chou Tien-chen; 21-19, 23-21	(South Korea) Ha Young-woong
November 5	Iceland International; Reykjavík, Iceland; International Series $5,000 – 32MS/32WS/16MD/16WD/16XD	(Chinese Taipei) Chiang Mei-hui; 21-17, 21-17	(Russia) Romina Gabdullina
November 5	Iceland International; Reykjavík, Iceland; International Series $5,000 – 32MS/32WS/16MD/16WD/16XD	(Wales) Joe Morgan (Wales) Nic Strange; 21-17,21-16	(Scotland) Martin Campbell (Scotland) Patrick Machugh
November 5	Iceland International; Reykjavík, Iceland; International Series $5,000 – 32MS/32WS/16MD/16WD/16XD	(South Korea) Lee So-hee (South Korea) Shin Seung-chan; 21-18, 21-16	(South Korea) Ko A-ra (South Korea) Yoo Hae-won
November 5	Iceland International; Reykjavík, Iceland; International Series $5,000 – 32MS/32WS/16MD/16WD/16XD	(Chinese Taipei) Chou Tien-chen (Chinese Taipei) Chiang Mei-hui; 21-16, 21-9	(Iceland) Helgi Johannesson (Iceland) Elin Thora Eliasdottir
November 12	China Open; Shanghai, China; Super Series Premier $400,000 – 32MS/32WS/32MD/32WD/32XD; Draw	(China) Chen Long; 21-19, 21–18	(China) Wang Zhengming
November 12	China Open; Shanghai, China; Super Series Premier $400,000 – 32MS/32WS/32MD/32WD/32XD; Draw	(China) Li Xuerui; 21–12, 21–9	(Thailand) Ratchanok Intanon
November 12	China Open; Shanghai, China; Super Series Premier $400,000 – 32MS/32WS/32MD/32WD/32XD; Draw	(Denmark) Mathias Boe (Denmark) Carsten Mogensen; 21–15, 21–14	(South Korea) Ko Sung-hyun (South Korea) Lee Yong-dae
November 12	China Open; Shanghai, China; Super Series Premier $400,000 – 32MS/32WS/32MD/32WD/32XD; Draw	(China) Wang Xiaoli (China) Yu Yang; 21-19, 14-7 Retired	(Japan) Miyuki Maeda (Japan) Satoko Suetsuna
November 12	China Open; Shanghai, China; Super Series Premier $400,000 – 32MS/32WS/32MD/32WD/32XD; Draw	(China) Xu Chen (China) Ma Jin; 21-15, 21-17	(Malaysia) Chan Peng Soon (Malaysia) Goh Liu Ying
November 12	Malaysia International; Kuching, Sarawak, Malaysia; International Challenge $15,000 – 64MS/32WS/32MD/32WD/32XD	(Indonesia) Wisnu Yuli Prasetyo; 3-21, 21-19, 21-18	(Malaysia) Muhammad Hafiz Hashim
November 12	Malaysia International; Kuching, Sarawak, Malaysia; International Challenge $15,000 – 64MS/32WS/32MD/32WD/32XD	(Malaysia) Lydia Cheah Li Ya; 21-17, 21-12	(Singapore) Liang Xiaoyu
November 12	Malaysia International; Kuching, Sarawak, Malaysia; International Challenge $15,000 – 64MS/32WS/32MD/32WD/32XD	(Malaysia) Goh V Shem (Malaysia) Teo Ee Yi; 21-15, 21-12	(Malaysia) Low Juan Shen (Malaysia) Tan Yip Jiun
November 12	Malaysia International; Kuching, Sarawak, Malaysia; International Challenge $15,000 – 64MS/32WS/32MD/32WD/32XD	(Malaysia) Chow Mei Kuan (Malaysia) Lee Meng Yean; 21-13, 23-21	(Indonesia) Ririn Amelia (Indonesia) Melvira Oklamona
November 12	Malaysia International; Kuching, Sarawak, Malaysia; International Challenge $15,000 – 64MS/32WS/32MD/32WD/32XD	(Malaysia) Ong Jian Guo (Malaysia) Woon Khe Wei; 21-11, 21-14	(Indonesia) Lukhi Apri Nugroho (Indonesia) Annisa Saufika
November 12	Suriname International; Paramaribo, Suriname; International Series $5,000 – 32MS/32WS/8MD/5WD RR/16XD	(Israel) Misha Zilberman; 16-21, 21-18, 21-11	(Cuba) Osleni Guerrero
November 12	Suriname International; Paramaribo, Suriname; International Series $5,000 – 32MS/32WS/8MD/5WD RR/16XD	(Netherlands) Patty Stolzenbach; 21-6, 21-12	(Suriname) Crystal Leefmans
November 12	Suriname International; Paramaribo, Suriname; International Series $5,000 – 32MS/32WS/8MD/5WD RR/16XD	(Guatemala) Humblers Heymard (Guatemala) Anibal Marroquin; 21-11, 21-16	(Suriname) Dylan Darmohoetomo (Suriname) Irfan Djabar
November 12	Suriname International; Paramaribo, Suriname; International Series $5,000 – 32MS/32WS/8MD/5WD RR/16XD	(Suriname) Crystal Leefmans (Suriname) Priscila Tjitrodipo; Round robin	(Barbados) Mariama Eastmond (Barbados) Dionne Forde
November 12	Suriname International; Paramaribo, Suriname; International Series $5,000 – 32MS/32WS/8MD/5WD RR/16XD	(Suriname) Mitchel Wongsodikromo (Suriname) Crystal Leefmans; 21-12, 21-18	(Guatemala) Ruben Castellanos (Guatemala) Nikte Alejandra Sotomayor
November 12	Norwegian International; Oslo, Norway; International Challenge $15,000 – 32MS/32WS/32MD/32WD/32XD	(Chinese Taipei) Chou Tien-chen; 21-17, 21-12	(Malaysia) Tan Chun Seang
November 12	Norwegian International; Oslo, Norway; International Challenge $15,000 – 32MS/32WS/32MD/32WD/32XD	(France) Sashina Vignes Waran; 18-21, 21-11, 21-17	(Bulgaria) Linda Zetchiri
November 12	Norwegian International; Oslo, Norway; International Challenge $15,000 – 32MS/32WS/32MD/32WD/32XD	(Netherlands) Ruud Bosch (Netherlands) Koen Ridder; 21-18, 20-22, 21-17	(Netherlands) Jacco Arends (Netherlands) Jelle Maas
November 12	Norwegian International; Oslo, Norway; International Challenge $15,000 – 32MS/32WS/32MD/32WD/32XD	(Netherlands) Samantha Barning (Netherlands) Eefje Muskens; 22-20, 21-16	(Netherlands) Selena Piek (Netherlands) Iris Tabeling
November 12	Norwegian International; Oslo, Norway; International Challenge $15,000 – 32MS/32WS/32MD/32WD/32XD	(Netherlands) Jorrit de Ruiter (Netherlands) Samantha Barning; 16-21, 23-21, 21-19	(Germany) Michael Fuchs (Germany) Birgit Michels
November 19	Hong Kong Open; Kowloon, Hong Kong; Super Series $350,000 – 32MS/32WS/32MD/32WD/32XD; Draw	(China) Chen Long; 21–19, 21–17	(Malaysia) Lee Chong Wei
November 19	Hong Kong Open; Kowloon, Hong Kong; Super Series $350,000 – 32MS/32WS/32MD/32WD/32XD; Draw	(China) Li Xuerui; 21-12, 11-3 Retired	(China) Wang Yihan
November 19	Hong Kong Open; Kowloon, Hong Kong; Super Series $350,000 – 32MS/32WS/32MD/32WD/32XD; Draw	(China) Cai Yun (China) Fu Haifeng; 21-16, 21-17	(Malaysia) Koo Kien Keat (Malaysia) Tan Boon Heong
November 19	Hong Kong Open; Kowloon, Hong Kong; Super Series $350,000 – 32MS/32WS/32MD/32WD/32XD; Draw	(China) Tian Qing (China) Zhao Yunlei; 22-20, 14-21, 21-17	(China) Wang Xiaoli (China) Yu Yang
November 19	Hong Kong Open; Kowloon, Hong Kong; Super Series $350,000 – 32MS/32WS/32MD/32WD/32XD; Draw	(China) Zhang Nan (China) Zhao Yunlei; 21-17, 21-17	(China) Xu Chen (China) Ma Jin
November 19	Scottish International; Glasgow, Scotland; International Challenge $15,000 – 64MS/64WS/32MD/32WD/32XD	(India) Anand Pawar; 10-21, 21-11, 21-17	(Japan) Kazumasa Sakai
November 19	Scottish International; Glasgow, Scotland; International Challenge $15,000 – 64MS/64WS/32MD/32WD/32XD	(Japan) Sayaka Takahashi; 21–6, 21-8	(South Korea) Kim Hyo-min
November 19	Scottish International; Glasgow, Scotland; International Challenge $15,000 – 64MS/64WS/32MD/32WD/32XD	(Japan) Takeshi Kamura (Japan) Keigo Sonoda; 16-21, 21-11, 21-17	(Japan) Hiroyuki Saeki (Japan) Ryota Taohata
November 19	Scottish International; Glasgow, Scotland; International Challenge $15,000 – 64MS/64WS/32MD/32WD/32XD	(Japan) Naoko Fukuman (Japan) Kurumi Yonao; 23-21, 21-18	(Japan) Yonemoto Koharu (Japan) Yuriko Miki
November 19	Scottish International; Glasgow, Scotland; International Challenge $15,000 – 64MS/64WS/32MD/32WD/32XD	(England) Marcus Ellis (England) Gabrielle White; 21–16, 21–16	(Netherlands) Ruud Bosch (Netherlands) Selena Piek
November 26	Macau Open; Macau; Grand Prix Gold $120,000 – 64MS/32WS/32MD/32WD/32XD; Draw	(China) Chen Yuekun; 21-9, 21-17	(China) Gao Huan
November 26	Macau Open; Macau; Grand Prix Gold $120,000 – 64MS/32WS/32MD/32WD/32XD; Draw	(China) Sun Yu; 21-19, 21-8	(Thailand) Busanan Ongbumrungpan
November 26	Macau Open; Macau; Grand Prix Gold $120,000 – 64MS/32WS/32MD/32WD/32XD; Draw	(Chinese Taipei) Lee Sheng-mu (Chinese Taipei) Tsai Chia-hsin; 14-21, 21-17, 21-16	(Russia) Vladimir Ivanov (Russia) Ivan Sozonov
November 26	Macau Open; Macau; Grand Prix Gold $120,000 – 64MS/32WS/32MD/32WD/32XD; Draw	(South Korea) Eom Hye-won (South Korea) Jang Ye-na; 21-18, 21-16	(South Korea) Choi Hye-in (South Korea) Kim So-young
November 26	Macau Open; Macau; Grand Prix Gold $120,000 – 64MS/32WS/32MD/32WD/32XD; Draw	(Indonesia) Tontowi Ahmad (Indonesia) Liliyana Natsir; 21-16, 14-21, 21-16	(Indonesia) Muhammad Rijal (Indonesia) Debby Susanto
November 26	Welsh International; Cardiff, Wales; International Challenge $15,000 – 32MS/32WS/32MD/32WD/32XD	(Chinese Taipei) Chou Tien-chen; 21-15, 21-13	(Malaysia) Kuan Beng Hong
November 26	Welsh International; Cardiff, Wales; International Challenge $15,000 – 32MS/32WS/32MD/32WD/32XD	(Chinese Taipei) Chiang Mei-hui; 19-21, 21-19, 21-17	(Bulgaria) Petya Nedelcheva
November 26	Welsh International; Cardiff, Wales; International Challenge $15,000 – 32MS/32WS/32MD/32WD/32XD	(England) Marcus Ellis (Scotland) Paul van Rietvelde; 16-21, 21-9, 21-16	(England) Peter Briggs (England) Harley Towler
November 26	Welsh International; Cardiff, Wales; International Challenge $15,000 – 32MS/32WS/32MD/32WD/32XD	(England) Lauren Smith (England) Gabrielle White; 21-7, 21-14	(Scotland) Jillie Cooper (Scotland) Kirsty Gilmour
November 26	Welsh International; Cardiff, Wales; International Challenge $15,000 – 32MS/32WS/32MD/32WD/32XD	(England) Marcus Ellis (England) Gabrielle White; 22-20, 21-16	(England) Chris Langridge (England) Heather Olver
November 26	Botswana International; Lobatse, Botswana; Future Series; 64MS/32WS/16MD/8WD/16XD	(Scotland) Alistair Casey; 21-13, 21-7	(South Africa) Andries Malan
November 26	Botswana International; Lobatse, Botswana; Future Series; 64MS/32WS/16MD/8WD/16XD	(Mauritius) Shama Aboobakar; 18-21, 21-16, 21-17	(South Africa) Elme de Villiers
November 26	Botswana International; Lobatse, Botswana; Future Series; 64MS/32WS/16MD/8WD/16XD	(South Africa) Andries Malan (South Africa) Reneshan Naidoo; 21-13, 21-17	(Botswana) Godwin Mathumo (Botswana) Orideetse Thela
November 26	Botswana International; Lobatse, Botswana; Future Series; 64MS/32WS/16MD/8WD/16XD	(South Africa) Elme De Villiers (South Africa) Jennifer Van Den Berg; 21-7, 21-10	(Botswana) Kgalalelo Kegakilwe (Botswana) Botho Makubate
November 26	Botswana International; Lobatse, Botswana; Future Series; 64MS/32WS/16MD/8WD/16XD	(South Africa) Andries Malan (South Africa) Jennifer Van Den Berg; 21-10, 12-21, 21-15	(South Africa) Reneshan Naidoo (South Africa) Elme de Villiers

=== December ===
Week of	Tournament	Champions	Runners-up
December 3	Korea Masters; Jeonnam, South Korea; Grand Prix Gold $120,000 – 64MS/32WS/32MD/32WD/32XD; Draw	(South Korea) Lee Dong-keun; 21-17, 21-14	(Thailand) Tanongsak Saensomboonsuk
December 3	Korea Masters; Jeonnam, South Korea; Grand Prix Gold $120,000 – 64MS/32WS/32MD/32WD/32XD; Draw	(South Korea) Sung Ji-hyun; 21-10, 21-10	(Indonesia) Aprilla Yuswandari
December 3	Korea Masters; Jeonnam, South Korea; Grand Prix Gold $120,000 – 64MS/32WS/32MD/32WD/32XD; Draw	(South Korea) Ko Sung-hyun (South Korea) Lee Yong-dae; 21-12, 21-11	(South Korea) Kim Gi-jung (South Korea) Kim Sa-rang
December 3	Korea Masters; Jeonnam, South Korea; Grand Prix Gold $120,000 – 64MS/32WS/32MD/32WD/32XD; Draw	(South Korea) Eom Hye-won (South Korea) Jang Ye-na; 21-13, 21-17	(South Korea) Lee So-hee (South Korea) Shin Seung-chan
December 3	Korea Masters; Jeonnam, South Korea; Grand Prix Gold $120,000 – 64MS/32WS/32MD/32WD/32XD; Draw	(South Korea) Shin Baek-choel (South Korea) Eom Hye-won; 11-21, 21-18, 25-23	(South Korea) Yoo Yeon-seong (South Korea) Jang Ye-na
December 3	Irish Open; Dublin, Ireland; International Series $5,000 – 32MS/32WS/32MD/32WD/32XD	(Republic of Ireland) Scott Evans; 21-19, 21-18	(France) Lucas Corvee
December 3	Irish Open; Dublin, Ireland; International Series $5,000 – 32MS/32WS/32MD/32WD/32XD	(Denmark) Line Kjaersfeldt; 23-21, 18-21, 21-18	(Republic of Ireland) Chloe Magee
December 3	Irish Open; Dublin, Ireland; International Series $5,000 – 32MS/32WS/32MD/32WD/32XD	(Netherlands) Jacco Arends (Netherlands) Jelle Maas; 21-14, 21-19	(Germany) Johannes Schoettler (Germany) Josche Zurwonne
December 3	Irish Open; Dublin, Ireland; International Series $5,000 – 32MS/32WS/32MD/32WD/32XD	(Netherlands) Samantha Barning (Netherlands) Eefje Muskens; 21-12, 21-8	(France) Audrey Fontaine (France) Emilie Lefel
December 3	Irish Open; Dublin, Ireland; International Series $5,000 – 32MS/32WS/32MD/32WD/32XD	(Netherlands) Jorrit de Ruiter (Netherlands) Samantha Barning; 22-20, 21-17	(Netherlands) Jacco Arends (Netherlands) Ilse Vaessen
December 3	South Africa International; Pretoria, South Africa; Future Series; 32MS/16WS/16MD/16WD/32XD	(Scotland) Alistair Casey; 26-24, 20-22, 21-18	(South Africa) Willem Viljoen
December 3	South Africa International; Pretoria, South Africa; Future Series; 32MS/16WS/16MD/16WD/32XD	(South Africa) Stacey Doubell; 21-16, 21-18	(South Africa) Elme de Villiers
December 3	South Africa International; Pretoria, South Africa; Future Series; 32MS/16WS/16MD/16WD/32XD	(South Africa) Andries Malan (South Africa) Willem Viljoen; 24-22, 9-21, 24-22	(South Africa) Dorian Lance James (South Africa) Enrico James
December 3	South Africa International; Pretoria, South Africa; Future Series; 32MS/16WS/16MD/16WD/32XD	(South Africa) Michelle Claire Edwards (South Africa) Annari Viljoen; 21-19, 15-21, 21-13	(Mauritius) Shama Aboobakar (South Africa) Stacey Doubell
December 3	South Africa International; Pretoria, South Africa; Future Series; 32MS/16WS/16MD/16WD/32XD	(South Africa) Willem Viljoen (South Africa) Annari Viljoen; 21-15, 16-21, 21-12	(South Africa) Dorian Lance James (South Africa) Michelle Claire Edwards
December 10	India International; Mumbai, India; International Challenge $15,000 – 32MS/32WS/16MD/16WD/16XD	(India) R. M. V. Gurusaidutt; 21-19, 21-12	(India) B. Sai Praneeth
December 10	India International; Mumbai, India; International Challenge $15,000 – 32MS/32WS/16MD/16WD/16XD	(India) P. C. Thulasi; 21-15, 21-13	(Indonesia) Febby Angguni
December 10	India International; Mumbai, India; International Challenge $15,000 – 32MS/32WS/16MD/16WD/16XD	(South Korea) Ko Sung-hyun (South Korea) Lee Yong-dae; 21-11, 21-10	(South Korea) Cho Gun-woo (South Korea) Kim Dae-eun
December 10	India International; Mumbai, India; International Challenge $15,000 – 32MS/32WS/16MD/16WD/16XD	(South Korea) Lee So-hee (South Korea) Shin Seung-chan; 19-21, 21-13, 21-17	(India) Aparna Balan (India) N. Siki Reddy
December 10	India International; Mumbai, India; International Challenge $15,000 – 32MS/32WS/16MD/16WD/16XD	(Indonesia) Irfan Fadhilah (Indonesia) Weni Anggraini; 21-16, 21-19	(Indonesia) Alfian Eko Prasetya (Indonesia) Gloria Emanuelle Widjaja
December 10	Superseries Finals; Shenzhen, China; BWF Super Series Finals $500,000 – 8MS (RR)/8WS (RR)/8MD (RR)/8WD (RR)/8XD (RR); Draw	(China) Chen Long; 21-12, 21-13	(China) Du Pengyu
December 10	Superseries Finals; Shenzhen, China; BWF Super Series Finals $500,000 – 8MS (RR)/8WS (RR)/8MD (RR)/8WD (RR)/8XD (RR); Draw	(China) Li Xuerui; 21-9, 15-4 Retired	(China) Wang Shixian
December 10	Superseries Finals; Shenzhen, China; BWF Super Series Finals $500,000 – 8MS (RR)/8WS (RR)/8MD (RR)/8WD (RR)/8XD (RR); Draw	(Denmark) Mathias Boe (Denmark) Carsten Mogensen; 21-17, 21-19	(Japan) Hiroyuki Endo (Japan) Kenichi Hayakawa
December 10	Superseries Finals; Shenzhen, China; BWF Super Series Finals $500,000 – 8MS (RR)/8WS (RR)/8MD (RR)/8WD (RR)/8XD (RR); Draw	(China) Wang Xiaoli (China) Yu Yang; 21-16, 21-14	(Denmark) Christinna Pedersen (Denmark) Kamilla Rytter Juhl
December 10	Superseries Finals; Shenzhen, China; BWF Super Series Finals $500,000 – 8MS (RR)/8WS (RR)/8MD (RR)/8WD (RR)/8XD (RR); Draw	(Denmark) Joachim Fischer Nielsen (Denmark) Christinna Pedersen; 17-21, 21-12, 21-14	(China) Zhang Nan (China) Zhao Yunlei
December 17	India Grand Prix Gold; Lucknow, India; Grand Prix Gold $120,000 – 64MS/32WS/32MD/32WD/32XD; Draw	(India) Kashyap Parupalli; 21-19, 14-21, 21-17	(Thailand) Tanongsak Saensomboonsuk
December 17	India Grand Prix Gold; Lucknow, India; Grand Prix Gold $120,000 – 64MS/32WS/32MD/32WD/32XD; Draw	(Indonesia) Lindaweni Fanetri; 21-15, 18-21, 21-18	(India) Pusarla Venkata Sindhu
December 17	India Grand Prix Gold; Lucknow, India; Grand Prix Gold $120,000 – 64MS/32WS/32MD/32WD/32XD; Draw	(South Korea) Ko Sung-hyun (South Korea) Lee Yong-dae; 21-13, 21-19	(South Korea) Kang Ji-wook (South Korea) Lee Sang-joon
December 17	India Grand Prix Gold; Lucknow, India; Grand Prix Gold $120,000 – 64MS/32WS/32MD/32WD/32XD; Draw	(Thailand) Savitree Amitrapai (Thailand) Sapsiree Taerattanachai; 21-12, 21-6	(Indonesia) Komala Dewi (Indonesia) Jenna Gozali
December 17	India Grand Prix Gold; Lucknow, India; Grand Prix Gold $120,000 – 64MS/32WS/32MD/32WD/32XD; Draw	(Indonesia) Fran Kurniawan (Indonesia) Shendy Puspa Irawati; 21-12, 24-22	(Thailand) Nipitphon Puangpuapech (Thailand) Savitree Amitrapai
December 17	Turkey International; Istanbul, Turkey; International Series $5,000 – 32MS/32WS/32MD/32WD/32XD	(Ukraine) Dmytro Zavadsky; 21-19, 21-19	(Poland) Adrian Dziolko
December 17	Turkey International; Istanbul, Turkey; International Series $5,000 – 32MS/32WS/32MD/32WD/32XD	(Republic of Ireland) Chloe Magee; 21-18, 23-21	(France) Sashina Vignes Waran
December 17	Turkey International; Istanbul, Turkey; International Series $5,000 – 32MS/32WS/32MD/32WD/32XD	(Scotland) Robert Blair (Malaysia) Tan Bin Shen; 21-11, 21-15	(Sweden) Magnus Sahlberg (Sweden) Mattias Wigardt
December 17	Turkey International; Istanbul, Turkey; International Series $5,000 – 32MS/32WS/32MD/32WD/32XD	(Bulgaria) Gabriela Stoeva (Bulgaria) Stefani Stoeva; 19-21, 21-14, 23-21	(Turkey) Ozge Bayrak (Turkey) Neslihan Yigit
December 17	Turkey International; Istanbul, Turkey; International Series $5,000 – 32MS/32WS/32MD/32WD/32XD	(Republic of Ireland) Sam Magee (Republic of Ireland) Chloe Magee; 21-10, 21-14	(Germany) Fabian Roth (Germany) Jennifer Karnott
December 24	Copenhagen Masters; Frederiksberg, Copenhagen Denmark; Others (Invitation); 2MS Peter Gade/4MS/4MD/4XD	(Denmark) Peter Gade; 20-22, 21-16, 21-14	(China) Lin Dan
December 24	Copenhagen Masters; Frederiksberg, Copenhagen Denmark; Others (Invitation); 2MS Peter Gade/4MS/4MD/4XD	(Denmark) Jan O. Jorgensen; 21-12, 21-11	(Hong Kong) Hu Yun
December 24	Copenhagen Masters; Frederiksberg, Copenhagen Denmark; Others (Invitation); 2MS Peter Gade/4MS/4MD/4XD	(Denmark) Mads Pieler Kolding (Denmark) Carsten Mogensen; 21-23, 21-16, 23-21	(Denmark) Rasmus Bonde (Denmark) Mads Conrad-Petersen
December 24	Copenhagen Masters; Frederiksberg, Copenhagen Denmark; Others (Invitation); 2MS Peter Gade/4MS/4MD/4XD	(Denmark) Joachim Fischer Nielsen (Denmark) Christinna Pedersen; 21-19, 21-17	(Thailand) Sudket Prapakamol (Thailand) Saralee Thoungthongkam
