= Andréa Vanderstukken =

Personal information
- Born: 21 April 1991 (age 35)

Sport
- Country: France
- Sport: Badminton

Women's & mixed doubles
- Highest ranking: 169 (WD 10 January 2013); 212 (XD 16 November 2012)
- BWF profile

Andréa Vanderstukken (born 21 April 1991) is a French badminton player. In 2012, she won the Bill Graham Miami International tournament in women's doubles and mixed doubles events.

== Achievements ==
=== BWF International Challenge/Series ===
Women's doubles
Year	Tournament	Partner	Opponent	Score	Result
2012	Miami International	(France) Perrine Le Buhanic	(Suriname) Crystal Leefmans (Suriname) Priscila Tjitrodipo	21–15, 21–5	(gold) Winner

Mixed doubles
Year	Tournament	Partner	Opponent	Score	Result
2012	Miami International	(France) Laurent Constantin	(Suriname) Mitchel Wongsodikromo (Suriname) Crystal Leefmans	23–21, 21–14	(gold) Winner

BWF International Challenge tournament
BWF International Series tournament
BWF Future Series tournament
