= Perrine Le Buhanic =

French badminton player (born 1982)

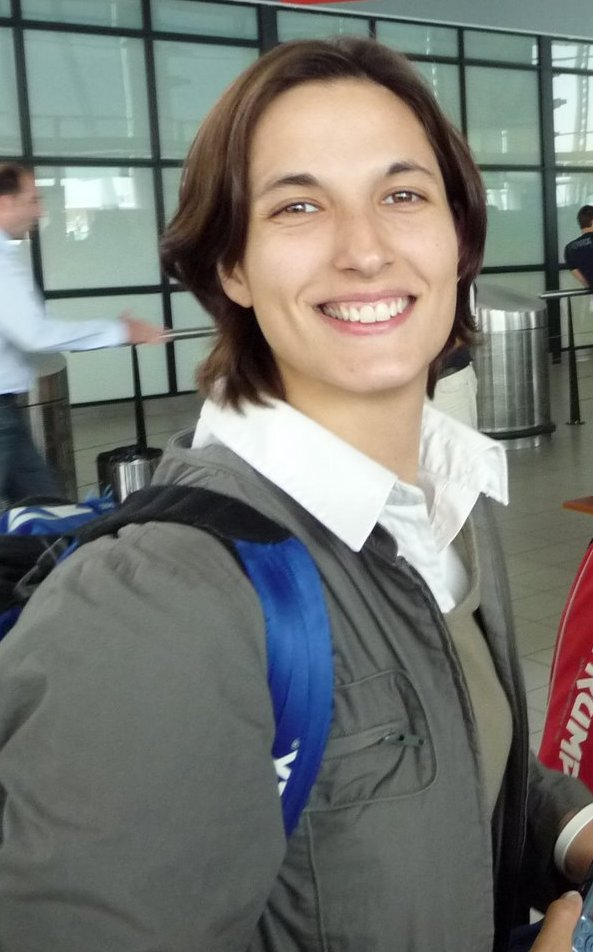

Personal information
- Born: 1 February 1982 (age 44) Pont-l'Abbé, France
- Height: 1.78 m (5 ft 10 in)
- Weight: 63 kg (139 lb)

Sport
- Country: France
- Sport: Badminton

Women's singles & doubles
- Highest ranking: 74 (WS 2 September 2011); 124 (WD 22 October 2009); 1076 (XD 16 May 2013)
- BWF profile

Perrine Le Buhanic (born 1 February 1982) is a French badminton player. In 2011 and 2016, she won French National Badminton Championships in the women's singles event.

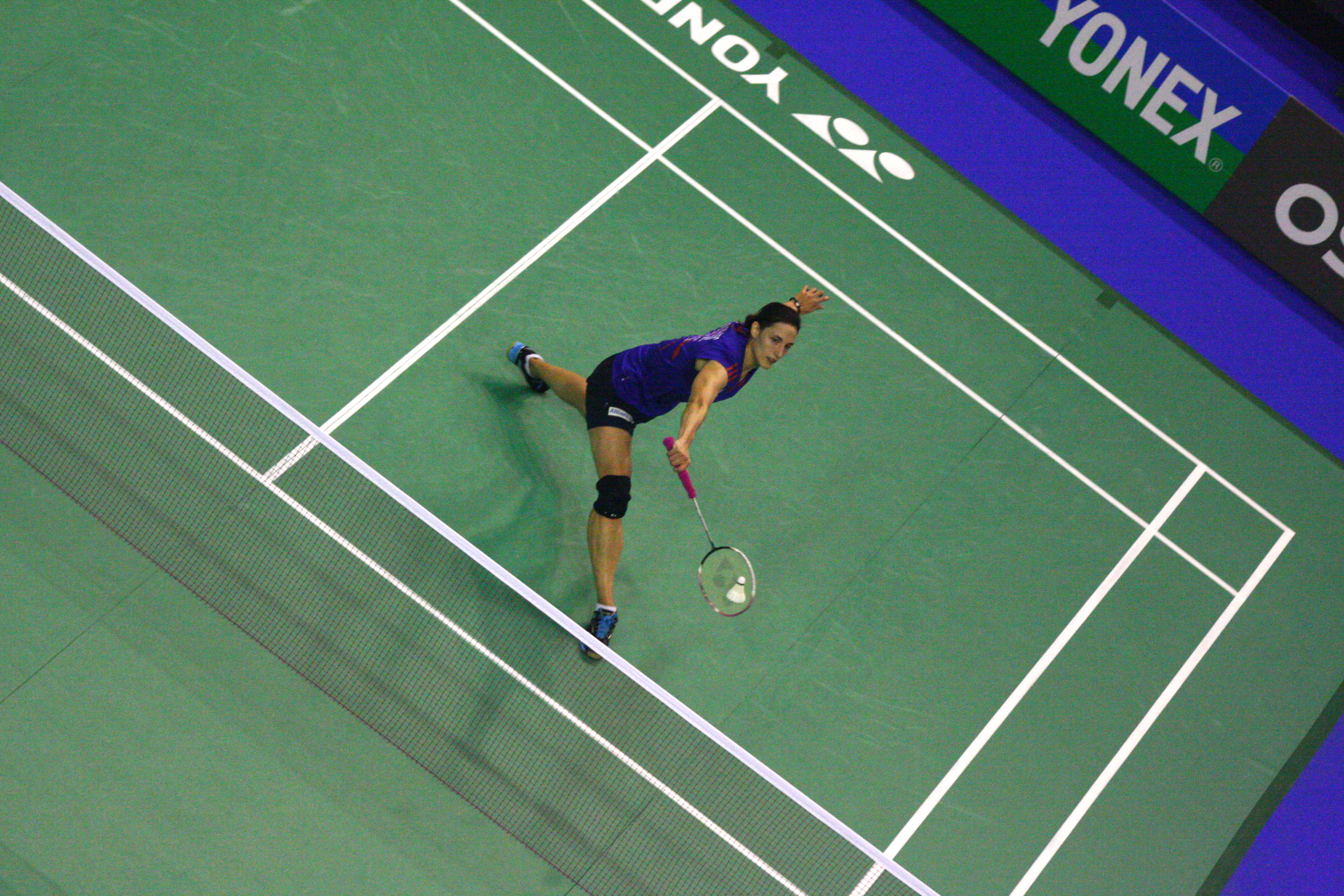
Le Buhanic in French International 2012.

== Achievements ==
=== BWF International Challenge/Series ===
Women's singles
Year	Tournament	Opponent	Score	Result
2005	Welsh International	(England) Eleanor Cox	11–13, 4–11	(silver) Runner-up
2011	Croatian International	(Japan) Minatsu Mitani	14–21, 17–21	(silver) Runner-up
2012	Irish International	(Republic of Ireland) Sinead Chambers	21–17, 21–17	(gold) Winner
2012	Miami International	(United States) Jamie Subandhi	13–21, 11–21	(silver) Runner-up

Women's doubles
Year	Tournament	Partner	Opponent	Score	Result
2003	Welsh International	(France) Laura Choinet	(Russia) Ella Karachkova (Russia) Anastasia Russkikh	1–15, 4–15	(silver) Runner-up
2012	Miami International	(France) Andréa Vanderstukken	(Suriname) Crystal Leefmans (Suriname) Priscila Tjitrodipo	21–15, 21–5	(gold) Winner

Commonwealth Youth Games tournament
BWF International Series tournament
BWF Future Series tournament
