= 2024 BWF season =

Badminton World Federation circuit

Details
- Duration: 9 January – 26 December
- Edition: 18th
- Tournaments: 133
- Categories: Grade 1 – (Individuals, Teams): 2; Grade 2 – BWF World Tour Finals: 1; Grade 2 – Super 1000: 4; Grade 2 – Super 750: 6; Grade 2 – Super 500: 9; Grade 2 – Super 300: 11; Grade 2 – Super 100: 9; Grade 3 – International Challenge: 33; Grade 3 – International Series: 26; Grade 3 – Future Series: 19; Continental Championships: 12; Multisport: 1

Achievements (singles)

Awards
- Player of the year: (China) Shi Yuqi (Male) (South Korea) An Se-young (Female)

The 2024 BWF season was the overall badminton circuit organized by the Badminton World Federation (BWF) for the 2024 badminton season. The world badminton tournament in 2024 consists of:
1. BWF tournaments (Grade 1; Major Events)

- BWF World Team Championships (Thomas & Uber Cup)
- Olympics

2. BWF World Tour (Grade 2)

- Level 1 (BWF World Tour Finals)
- Level 2 (BWF World Tour Super 1000)
- Level 3 (BWF World Tour Super 750)
- Level 4 (BWF World Tour Super 500)
- Level 5 (BWF World Tour Super 300)
- Level 6 (BWF Tour Super 100)

3. Continental Circuit (Grade 3) BWF Open Tournaments: BWF International Challenge, BWF International Series, and BWF Future Series.

The Thomas & Uber Cup was a teams event. The others – Super 1000, Super 750, Super 500, Super 300, Super 100, International Challenge, International Series, and Future Series were all individual tournaments. The higher the level of tournament, the larger the prize money and the more ranking points were available.

The 2024 BWF season calendar comprised these six levels of BWF tournaments.

== Schedule ==
This is the complete schedule of events on the 2024 calendar, with the champions and runners-up documented.

Key

Olympics
World Tour Finals
Super 1000
Super 750
Super 500
Super 300
Super 100
International Challenge
International Series
Future Series
Continental events/Team Events

=== January ===
Week commencing	Tournament	Champions	Runners-up
8 January	Malaysia Open (Draw): Dates: 9 January – 14 January; Host: Kuala Lumpur, Malaysia; Venue: Axiata Arena; Level: Super 1000; Prize: $1,300,000; Format: 32MS/32WS/32MD/32WD/32XD	(Denmark) Anders Antonsen	(China) Shi Yuqi
8 January	Malaysia Open (Draw): Dates: 9 January – 14 January; Host: Kuala Lumpur, Malaysia; Venue: Axiata Arena; Level: Super 1000; Prize: $1,300,000; Format: 32MS/32WS/32MD/32WD/32XD	Score: 21–14, 21–13	
8 January	Malaysia Open (Draw): Dates: 9 January – 14 January; Host: Kuala Lumpur, Malaysia; Venue: Axiata Arena; Level: Super 1000; Prize: $1,300,000; Format: 32MS/32WS/32MD/32WD/32XD	(South Korea) An Se-young	(Chinese Taipei) Tai Tzu-ying
8 January	Malaysia Open (Draw): Dates: 9 January – 14 January; Host: Kuala Lumpur, Malaysia; Venue: Axiata Arena; Level: Super 1000; Prize: $1,300,000; Format: 32MS/32WS/32MD/32WD/32XD	Score: 10–21, 21–10, 21–18	
8 January	Malaysia Open (Draw): Dates: 9 January – 14 January; Host: Kuala Lumpur, Malaysia; Venue: Axiata Arena; Level: Super 1000; Prize: $1,300,000; Format: 32MS/32WS/32MD/32WD/32XD	(China) Liang Weikeng (China) Wang Chang	(India) Satwiksairaj Rankireddy (India) Chirag Shetty
8 January	Malaysia Open (Draw): Dates: 9 January – 14 January; Host: Kuala Lumpur, Malaysia; Venue: Axiata Arena; Level: Super 1000; Prize: $1,300,000; Format: 32MS/32WS/32MD/32WD/32XD	Score: 9–21, 21–18, 21–17	
8 January	Malaysia Open (Draw): Dates: 9 January – 14 January; Host: Kuala Lumpur, Malaysia; Venue: Axiata Arena; Level: Super 1000; Prize: $1,300,000; Format: 32MS/32WS/32MD/32WD/32XD	(China) Liu Shengshu (China) Tan Ning	(China) Zhang Shuxian (China) Zheng Yu
8 January	Malaysia Open (Draw): Dates: 9 January – 14 January; Host: Kuala Lumpur, Malaysia; Venue: Axiata Arena; Level: Super 1000; Prize: $1,300,000; Format: 32MS/32WS/32MD/32WD/32XD	Score: 21–18, 21–18	
8 January	Malaysia Open (Draw): Dates: 9 January – 14 January; Host: Kuala Lumpur, Malaysia; Venue: Axiata Arena; Level: Super 1000; Prize: $1,300,000; Format: 32MS/32WS/32MD/32WD/32XD	(Japan) Yuta Watanabe (Japan) Arisa Higashino	(South Korea) Kim Won-ho (South Korea) Jeong Na-eun
8 January	Malaysia Open (Draw): Dates: 9 January – 14 January; Host: Kuala Lumpur, Malaysia; Venue: Axiata Arena; Level: Super 1000; Prize: $1,300,000; Format: 32MS/32WS/32MD/32WD/32XD	Score: 21–18, 21–15	
8 January	Estonian International: Dates: 11 January – 14 January; Host: Tallinn, Estonia; Venue: Kalevi Spordihall; Level: International Series; Prize: $5,000; Format: 32MS/32WS/32MD/32WD/32XD	(Finland) Joakim Oldorff	(Ukraine) Danylo Bosniuk
8 January	Estonian International: Dates: 11 January – 14 January; Host: Tallinn, Estonia; Venue: Kalevi Spordihall; Level: International Series; Prize: $5,000; Format: 32MS/32WS/32MD/32WD/32XD	Score: 21–5, 21–13	
8 January	Estonian International: Dates: 11 January – 14 January; Host: Tallinn, Estonia; Venue: Kalevi Spordihall; Level: International Series; Prize: $5,000; Format: 32MS/32WS/32MD/32WD/32XD	(France) Rosy Oktavia Pancasari	(India) Devika Sihag
8 January	Estonian International: Dates: 11 January – 14 January; Host: Tallinn, Estonia; Venue: Kalevi Spordihall; Level: International Series; Prize: $5,000; Format: 32MS/32WS/32MD/32WD/32XD	Score: 21–19, 21–14	
8 January	Estonian International: Dates: 11 January – 14 January; Host: Tallinn, Estonia; Venue: Kalevi Spordihall; Level: International Series; Prize: $5,000; Format: 32MS/32WS/32MD/32WD/32XD	(Singapore) Loh Kean Hean (Singapore) Nicholas Low	(Bulgaria) Ivan Rusev (Bulgaria) Iliyan Stoynov
8 January	Estonian International: Dates: 11 January – 14 January; Host: Tallinn, Estonia; Venue: Kalevi Spordihall; Level: International Series; Prize: $5,000; Format: 32MS/32WS/32MD/32WD/32XD	Score: 21–18, 21–8	
8 January	Estonian International: Dates: 11 January – 14 January; Host: Tallinn, Estonia; Venue: Kalevi Spordihall; Level: International Series; Prize: $5,000; Format: 32MS/32WS/32MD/32WD/32XD	(Turkey) Bengisu Erçetin (Turkey) Nazlıcan İnci	(England) Chloe Birch (England) Estelle van Leeuwen
8 January	Estonian International: Dates: 11 January – 14 January; Host: Tallinn, Estonia; Venue: Kalevi Spordihall; Level: International Series; Prize: $5,000; Format: 32MS/32WS/32MD/32WD/32XD	Score: 23–21, 16–21, 21–8	
8 January	Estonian International: Dates: 11 January – 14 January; Host: Tallinn, Estonia; Venue: Kalevi Spordihall; Level: International Series; Prize: $5,000; Format: 32MS/32WS/32MD/32WD/32XD	(Germany) Jones Ralfy Jansen (Germany) Thuc Phuong Nguyen	(Sweden) Ludwig Axelsson (Sweden) Jessica Silvennoinen
8 January	Estonian International: Dates: 11 January – 14 January; Host: Tallinn, Estonia; Venue: Kalevi Spordihall; Level: International Series; Prize: $5,000; Format: 32MS/32WS/32MD/32WD/32XD	Score: 21–14, 21–18	
15 January	India Open (Draw): Dates: 16 January – 21 January; Host: New Delhi, India; Venue: K. D. Jadhav Indoor Stadium; Level: Super 750; Prize: $850,000; Format: 32MS/32WS/32MD/32WD/32XD	(China) Shi Yuqi	(Hong Kong) Lee Cheuk Yiu
15 January	India Open (Draw): Dates: 16 January – 21 January; Host: New Delhi, India; Venue: K. D. Jadhav Indoor Stadium; Level: Super 750; Prize: $850,000; Format: 32MS/32WS/32MD/32WD/32XD	Score: 23–21, 21–17	
15 January	India Open (Draw): Dates: 16 January – 21 January; Host: New Delhi, India; Venue: K. D. Jadhav Indoor Stadium; Level: Super 750; Prize: $850,000; Format: 32MS/32WS/32MD/32WD/32XD	(Chinese Taipei) Tai Tzu-ying	(China) Chen Yufei
15 January	India Open (Draw): Dates: 16 January – 21 January; Host: New Delhi, India; Venue: K. D. Jadhav Indoor Stadium; Level: Super 750; Prize: $850,000; Format: 32MS/32WS/32MD/32WD/32XD	Score: 21–16, 21–12	
15 January	India Open (Draw): Dates: 16 January – 21 January; Host: New Delhi, India; Venue: K. D. Jadhav Indoor Stadium; Level: Super 750; Prize: $850,000; Format: 32MS/32WS/32MD/32WD/32XD	(South Korea) Kang Min-hyuk (South Korea) Seo Seung-jae	(India) Satwiksairaj Rankireddy (India) Chirag Shetty
15 January	India Open (Draw): Dates: 16 January – 21 January; Host: New Delhi, India; Venue: K. D. Jadhav Indoor Stadium; Level: Super 750; Prize: $850,000; Format: 32MS/32WS/32MD/32WD/32XD	Score: 15–21, 21–11, 21–18	
15 January	India Open (Draw): Dates: 16 January – 21 January; Host: New Delhi, India; Venue: K. D. Jadhav Indoor Stadium; Level: Super 750; Prize: $850,000; Format: 32MS/32WS/32MD/32WD/32XD	(Japan) Mayu Matsumoto (Japan) Wakana Nagahara	(China) Zhang Shuxian (China) Zheng Yu
15 January	India Open (Draw): Dates: 16 January – 21 January; Host: New Delhi, India; Venue: K. D. Jadhav Indoor Stadium; Level: Super 750; Prize: $850,000; Format: 32MS/32WS/32MD/32WD/32XD	Score: 21–12, 21–13	
15 January	India Open (Draw): Dates: 16 January – 21 January; Host: New Delhi, India; Venue: K. D. Jadhav Indoor Stadium; Level: Super 750; Prize: $850,000; Format: 32MS/32WS/32MD/32WD/32XD	(Thailand) Dechapol Puavaranukroh (Thailand) Sapsiree Taerattanachai	(China) Jiang Zhenbang (China) Wei Yaxin
15 January	India Open (Draw): Dates: 16 January – 21 January; Host: New Delhi, India; Venue: K. D. Jadhav Indoor Stadium; Level: Super 750; Prize: $850,000; Format: 32MS/32WS/32MD/32WD/32XD	Score: 21–16, 21–16	
15 January	Swedish Open: Dates: 18 January – 21 January; Host: Uppsala, Sweden; Venue: IFU Arena; Level: International Series; Prize: $10,000; Format: 32MS/32WS/32MD/32WD/32XD	(Spain) Pablo Abián	(Indonesia) Andi Fadel Muhammad
15 January	Swedish Open: Dates: 18 January – 21 January; Host: Uppsala, Sweden; Venue: IFU Arena; Level: International Series; Prize: $10,000; Format: 32MS/32WS/32MD/32WD/32XD	Score: 23–21, 21–19	
15 January	Swedish Open: Dates: 18 January – 21 January; Host: Uppsala, Sweden; Venue: IFU Arena; Level: International Series; Prize: $10,000; Format: 32MS/32WS/32MD/32WD/32XD	(India) Devika Sihag	(France) Léonice Huet
15 January	Swedish Open: Dates: 18 January – 21 January; Host: Uppsala, Sweden; Venue: IFU Arena; Level: International Series; Prize: $10,000; Format: 32MS/32WS/32MD/32WD/32XD	Score: 18–21, 21–14, 21–19	
15 January	Swedish Open: Dates: 18 January – 21 January; Host: Uppsala, Sweden; Venue: IFU Arena; Level: International Series; Prize: $10,000; Format: 32MS/32WS/32MD/32WD/32XD	(Denmark) William Kryger Boe (Denmark) Christian Faust Kjær	(Sweden) Filip Karlborg (Sweden) Mio Molin
15 January	Swedish Open: Dates: 18 January – 21 January; Host: Uppsala, Sweden; Venue: IFU Arena; Level: International Series; Prize: $10,000; Format: 32MS/32WS/32MD/32WD/32XD	Score: 21–14, 21–14	
15 January	Swedish Open: Dates: 18 January – 21 January; Host: Uppsala, Sweden; Venue: IFU Arena; Level: International Series; Prize: $10,000; Format: 32MS/32WS/32MD/32WD/32XD	(Sweden) Moa Sjöö (Sweden) Tilda Sjöö	(Denmark) Amalie Cecilie Kudsk (Denmark) Signe Schulz
15 January	Swedish Open: Dates: 18 January – 21 January; Host: Uppsala, Sweden; Venue: IFU Arena; Level: International Series; Prize: $10,000; Format: 32MS/32WS/32MD/32WD/32XD	Score: 22–20, 21–19	
15 January	Swedish Open: Dates: 18 January – 21 January; Host: Uppsala, Sweden; Venue: IFU Arena; Level: International Series; Prize: $10,000; Format: 32MS/32WS/32MD/32WD/32XD	(Denmark) Rasmus Espersen (Denmark) Amalie Cecilie Kudsk	(Denmark) Jeppe Søby (Denmark) Kathrine Vang
15 January	Swedish Open: Dates: 18 January – 21 January; Host: Uppsala, Sweden; Venue: IFU Arena; Level: International Series; Prize: $10,000; Format: 32MS/32WS/32MD/32WD/32XD	Score: 21–16, 21–19	
22 January	Indonesia Masters (Draw): Dates: 23 January – 28 January; Host: Jakarta, Indonesia; Venue: Istora Gelora Bung Karno; Level: Super 500; Prize: $420,000; Format: 32MS/32WS/32MD/32WD/32XD	(Denmark) Anders Antonsen	(Canada) Brian Yang
22 January	Indonesia Masters (Draw): Dates: 23 January – 28 January; Host: Jakarta, Indonesia; Venue: Istora Gelora Bung Karno; Level: Super 500; Prize: $420,000; Format: 32MS/32WS/32MD/32WD/32XD	Score: 18–21, 21–13, 21–18	
22 January	Indonesia Masters (Draw): Dates: 23 January – 28 January; Host: Jakarta, Indonesia; Venue: Istora Gelora Bung Karno; Level: Super 500; Prize: $420,000; Format: 32MS/32WS/32MD/32WD/32XD	(China) Wang Zhiyi	(Japan) Nozomi Okuhara
22 January	Indonesia Masters (Draw): Dates: 23 January – 28 January; Host: Jakarta, Indonesia; Venue: Istora Gelora Bung Karno; Level: Super 500; Prize: $420,000; Format: 32MS/32WS/32MD/32WD/32XD	Score: 21–14, 21–13	
22 January	Indonesia Masters (Draw): Dates: 23 January – 28 January; Host: Jakarta, Indonesia; Venue: Istora Gelora Bung Karno; Level: Super 500; Prize: $420,000; Format: 32MS/32WS/32MD/32WD/32XD	(Indonesia) Leo Rolly Carnando (Indonesia) Daniel Marthin	(Denmark) Kim Astrup (Denmark) Anders Skaarup Rasmussen
22 January	Indonesia Masters (Draw): Dates: 23 January – 28 January; Host: Jakarta, Indonesia; Venue: Istora Gelora Bung Karno; Level: Super 500; Prize: $420,000; Format: 32MS/32WS/32MD/32WD/32XD	Score: 21–12, 20–22, 21–11	
22 January	Indonesia Masters (Draw): Dates: 23 January – 28 January; Host: Jakarta, Indonesia; Venue: Istora Gelora Bung Karno; Level: Super 500; Prize: $420,000; Format: 32MS/32WS/32MD/32WD/32XD	(China) Liu Shengshu (China) Tan Ning	(China) Zhang Shuxian (China) Zheng Yu
22 January	Indonesia Masters (Draw): Dates: 23 January – 28 January; Host: Jakarta, Indonesia; Venue: Istora Gelora Bung Karno; Level: Super 500; Prize: $420,000; Format: 32MS/32WS/32MD/32WD/32XD	Score: 10–21, 21–19, 22–20	
22 January	Indonesia Masters (Draw): Dates: 23 January – 28 January; Host: Jakarta, Indonesia; Venue: Istora Gelora Bung Karno; Level: Super 500; Prize: $420,000; Format: 32MS/32WS/32MD/32WD/32XD	(China) Zheng Siwei (China) Huang Yaqiong	(Japan) Hiroki Midorikawa (Japan) Natsu Saito
22 January	Indonesia Masters (Draw): Dates: 23 January – 28 January; Host: Jakarta, Indonesia; Venue: Istora Gelora Bung Karno; Level: Super 500; Prize: $420,000; Format: 32MS/32WS/32MD/32WD/32XD	Score: 21–15, 21–16	
22 January	Iceland International: Dates: 25 January – 28 January; Host: Reykjavík, Iceland; Venue: Tennis- og Badmintonfélag Reykjavíkur; Level: Future Series; Format: 32MS/32WS/32MD/32WD/32XD	(Denmark) Mads Juel Møller	(Denmark) Mathias Solgaard
22 January	Iceland International: Dates: 25 January – 28 January; Host: Reykjavík, Iceland; Venue: Tennis- og Badmintonfélag Reykjavíkur; Level: Future Series; Format: 32MS/32WS/32MD/32WD/32XD	Score: 21–19, 21–19	
22 January	Iceland International: Dates: 25 January – 28 January; Host: Reykjavík, Iceland; Venue: Tennis- og Badmintonfélag Reykjavíkur; Level: Future Series; Format: 32MS/32WS/32MD/32WD/32XD	(Switzerland) Milena Schnider	(England) Lisa Curtin
22 January	Iceland International: Dates: 25 January – 28 January; Host: Reykjavík, Iceland; Venue: Tennis- og Badmintonfélag Reykjavíkur; Level: Future Series; Format: 32MS/32WS/32MD/32WD/32XD	Score: 21–15, 21–17	
22 January	Iceland International: Dates: 25 January – 28 January; Host: Reykjavík, Iceland; Venue: Tennis- og Badmintonfélag Reykjavíkur; Level: Future Series; Format: 32MS/32WS/32MD/32WD/32XD	(Denmark) Benjamin Illum Klindt (Denmark) Magnus Klinggaard	(England) Robin Harper (England) Harry Wakefield
22 January	Iceland International: Dates: 25 January – 28 January; Host: Reykjavík, Iceland; Venue: Tennis- og Badmintonfélag Reykjavíkur; Level: Future Series; Format: 32MS/32WS/32MD/32WD/32XD	Score: 21–11, 21–12	
22 January	Iceland International: Dates: 25 January – 28 January; Host: Reykjavík, Iceland; Venue: Tennis- og Badmintonfélag Reykjavíkur; Level: Future Series; Format: 32MS/32WS/32MD/32WD/32XD	(Denmark) Sophia Lemming (Denmark) Cathrine Marie Wind	(England) Anne Hübscher (England) Magda-Sabrina Lozniceriu
22 January	Iceland International: Dates: 25 January – 28 January; Host: Reykjavík, Iceland; Venue: Tennis- og Badmintonfélag Reykjavíkur; Level: Future Series; Format: 32MS/32WS/32MD/32WD/32XD	Score: 22–20, 21–15	
22 January	Iceland International: Dates: 25 January – 28 January; Host: Reykjavík, Iceland; Venue: Tennis- og Badmintonfélag Reykjavíkur; Level: Future Series; Format: 32MS/32WS/32MD/32WD/32XD	(Denmark) Mikkel Klinggaard (Denmark) Naja Abildgaard	(Ukraine) Oleksii Titov (Ukraine) Yevheniia Kantemyr
22 January	Iceland International: Dates: 25 January – 28 January; Host: Reykjavík, Iceland; Venue: Tennis- og Badmintonfélag Reykjavíkur; Level: Future Series; Format: 32MS/32WS/32MD/32WD/32XD	Score: 21–11, 21–16	
29 January	Thailand Masters (Draw): Dates: 30 January – 4 February; Host: Bangkok, Thailand; Venue: Nimibutr Stadium; Level: Super 300; Prize: $210,000; Format: 32MS/32WS/32MD/32WD/32XD	(Chinese Taipei) Chou Tien-chen	(Singapore) Loh Kean Yew
29 January	Thailand Masters (Draw): Dates: 30 January – 4 February; Host: Bangkok, Thailand; Venue: Nimibutr Stadium; Level: Super 300; Prize: $210,000; Format: 32MS/32WS/32MD/32WD/32XD	Score: 21–16, 6–21, 21–16	
29 January	Thailand Masters (Draw): Dates: 30 January – 4 February; Host: Bangkok, Thailand; Venue: Nimibutr Stadium; Level: Super 300; Prize: $210,000; Format: 32MS/32WS/32MD/32WD/32XD	(Japan) Aya Ohori	(Thailand) Supanida Katethong
29 January	Thailand Masters (Draw): Dates: 30 January – 4 February; Host: Bangkok, Thailand; Venue: Nimibutr Stadium; Level: Super 300; Prize: $210,000; Format: 32MS/32WS/32MD/32WD/32XD	Score: 18–21, 21–17, 21–13	
29 January	Thailand Masters (Draw): Dates: 30 January – 4 February; Host: Bangkok, Thailand; Venue: Nimibutr Stadium; Level: Super 300; Prize: $210,000; Format: 32MS/32WS/32MD/32WD/32XD	(China) He Jiting (China) Ren Xiangyu	(Thailand) Peeratchai Sukphun (Thailand) Pakkapon Teeraratsakul
29 January	Thailand Masters (Draw): Dates: 30 January – 4 February; Host: Bangkok, Thailand; Venue: Nimibutr Stadium; Level: Super 300; Prize: $210,000; Format: 32MS/32WS/32MD/32WD/32XD	Score: 16–21, 21–14, 21–13	
29 January	Thailand Masters (Draw): Dates: 30 January – 4 February; Host: Bangkok, Thailand; Venue: Nimibutr Stadium; Level: Super 300; Prize: $210,000; Format: 32MS/32WS/32MD/32WD/32XD	(Thailand) Benyapa Aimsaard (Thailand) Nuntakarn Aimsaard	(China) Li Yijing (China) Luo Xumin
29 January	Thailand Masters (Draw): Dates: 30 January – 4 February; Host: Bangkok, Thailand; Venue: Nimibutr Stadium; Level: Super 300; Prize: $210,000; Format: 32MS/32WS/32MD/32WD/32XD	Score: 21–13, 17–21, 27–25	
29 January	Thailand Masters (Draw): Dates: 30 January – 4 February; Host: Bangkok, Thailand; Venue: Nimibutr Stadium; Level: Super 300; Prize: $210,000; Format: 32MS/32WS/32MD/32WD/32XD	(Thailand) Dechapol Puavaranukroh (Thailand) Sapsiree Taerattanachai	(Malaysia) Chen Tang Jie (Malaysia) Toh Ee Wei
29 January	Thailand Masters (Draw): Dates: 30 January – 4 February; Host: Bangkok, Thailand; Venue: Nimibutr Stadium; Level: Super 300; Prize: $210,000; Format: 32MS/32WS/32MD/32WD/32XD	Score: 21–12, 21–18	
29 January	Iran Fajr International: Dates: 30 January – 4 February; Host: Yazd, Iran; Venue: Yazd Sports Hall; Level: International Challenge; Prize: $15,000; Format: 64MS/64WS/32MD/32WD/16XD	(Vietnam) Nguyễn Hải Đăng	(India) Sathish Karunakaran
29 January	Iran Fajr International: Dates: 30 January – 4 February; Host: Yazd, Iran; Venue: Yazd Sports Hall; Level: International Challenge; Prize: $15,000; Format: 64MS/64WS/32MD/32WD/16XD	Score: 21–17, 21–18	
29 January	Iran Fajr International: Dates: 30 January – 4 February; Host: Yazd, Iran; Venue: Yazd Sports Hall; Level: International Challenge; Prize: $15,000; Format: 64MS/64WS/32MD/32WD/16XD	(Hong Kong) Lo Sin Yan	(India) Tasnim Mir
29 January	Iran Fajr International: Dates: 30 January – 4 February; Host: Yazd, Iran; Venue: Yazd Sports Hall; Level: International Challenge; Prize: $15,000; Format: 64MS/64WS/32MD/32WD/16XD	Score: 21–14, 21–12	
29 January	Iran Fajr International: Dates: 30 January – 4 February; Host: Yazd, Iran; Venue: Yazd Sports Hall; Level: International Challenge; Prize: $15,000; Format: 64MS/64WS/32MD/32WD/16XD	(India) Krishna Prasad Garaga (India) K. Sai Pratheek	(Mexico) Job Castillo (Mexico) Luis Montoya
29 January	Iran Fajr International: Dates: 30 January – 4 February; Host: Yazd, Iran; Venue: Yazd Sports Hall; Level: International Challenge; Prize: $15,000; Format: 64MS/64WS/32MD/32WD/16XD	Score: 21–18, 21–19	
29 January	Iran Fajr International: Dates: 30 January – 4 February; Host: Yazd, Iran; Venue: Yazd Sports Hall; Level: International Challenge; Prize: $15,000; Format: 64MS/64WS/32MD/32WD/16XD	(Brazil) Jaqueline Lima (Brazil) Sâmia Lima	(Iran) Paria Eskandari (Iran) Romina Tajik
29 January	Iran Fajr International: Dates: 30 January – 4 February; Host: Yazd, Iran; Venue: Yazd Sports Hall; Level: International Challenge; Prize: $15,000; Format: 64MS/64WS/32MD/32WD/16XD	Score: 21–14, 21–11	
29 January	Iran Fajr International: Dates: 30 January – 4 February; Host: Yazd, Iran; Venue: Yazd Sports Hall; Level: International Challenge; Prize: $15,000; Format: 64MS/64WS/32MD/32WD/16XD	(India) Sathish Karunakaran (India) Aadya Variyath	(India) B. Sumeeth Reddy (India) N. Sikki Reddy
29 January	Iran Fajr International: Dates: 30 January – 4 February; Host: Yazd, Iran; Venue: Yazd Sports Hall; Level: International Challenge; Prize: $15,000; Format: 64MS/64WS/32MD/32WD/16XD	Score: 22–20, 21–14	

=== February ===
Week commencing	Tournament	Champions	Runners-up
5 February	Sri Lanka International: Dates: 5 February – 11 February; Host: Galle, Sri Lanka; Venue: District Sport Complex; Level: International Challenge; Prize: $15,000; Format: 64MS/32WS/32MD/32WD/32XD	(India) Kartikey Gulshan Kumar	(India) Rithvik Sanjeevi
5 February	Sri Lanka International: Dates: 5 February – 11 February; Host: Galle, Sri Lanka; Venue: District Sport Complex; Level: International Challenge; Prize: $15,000; Format: 64MS/32WS/32MD/32WD/32XD	Score: 21–18, 21–17	
5 February	Sri Lanka International: Dates: 5 February – 11 February; Host: Galle, Sri Lanka; Venue: District Sport Complex; Level: International Challenge; Prize: $15,000; Format: 64MS/32WS/32MD/32WD/32XD	(India) Isharani Baruah	(India) Rakshitha Ramraj
5 February	Sri Lanka International: Dates: 5 February – 11 February; Host: Galle, Sri Lanka; Venue: District Sport Complex; Level: International Challenge; Prize: $15,000; Format: 64MS/32WS/32MD/32WD/32XD	Score: 22–20, 21–14	
5 February	Sri Lanka International: Dates: 5 February – 11 February; Host: Galle, Sri Lanka; Venue: District Sport Complex; Level: International Challenge; Prize: $15,000; Format: 64MS/32WS/32MD/32WD/32XD	(Indonesia) Rahmat Hidayat (Indonesia) Yeremia Rambitan	(Malaysia) Bryan Goonting (Malaysia) Fazriq Razif
5 February	Sri Lanka International: Dates: 5 February – 11 February; Host: Galle, Sri Lanka; Venue: District Sport Complex; Level: International Challenge; Prize: $15,000; Format: 64MS/32WS/32MD/32WD/32XD	Score: 18–21, 21–15, 21–15	
5 February	Sri Lanka International: Dates: 5 February – 11 February; Host: Galle, Sri Lanka; Venue: District Sport Complex; Level: International Challenge; Prize: $15,000; Format: 64MS/32WS/32MD/32WD/32XD	(Thailand) Pichamon Phatcharaphisutsin (Thailand) Nannapas Sukklad	(India) Rutaparna Panda (India) Swetaparna Panda
5 February	Sri Lanka International: Dates: 5 February – 11 February; Host: Galle, Sri Lanka; Venue: District Sport Complex; Level: International Challenge; Prize: $15,000; Format: 64MS/32WS/32MD/32WD/32XD	Score: 21–12, 21–14	
5 February	Sri Lanka International: Dates: 5 February – 11 February; Host: Galle, Sri Lanka; Venue: District Sport Complex; Level: International Challenge; Prize: $15,000; Format: 64MS/32WS/32MD/32WD/32XD	(India) Ashith Surya (India) Amrutha Pramuthesh	(Thailand) Phuwanat Horbanluekit (Thailand) Chasinee Korepap
5 February	Sri Lanka International: Dates: 5 February – 11 February; Host: Galle, Sri Lanka; Venue: District Sport Complex; Level: International Challenge; Prize: $15,000; Format: 64MS/32WS/32MD/32WD/32XD	Score: 21–15, 21–13	
5 February	Azerbaijan International: Dates: 8 February – 11 February; Host: Baku, Azerbaijan; Venue: Baku Sport Hall; Level: International Challenge; Prize: $15,000; Format: 32MS/32WS/32MD/32WD/32XD	(South Korea) Jeon Hyeok-jin	(India) Sameer Verma
5 February	Azerbaijan International: Dates: 8 February – 11 February; Host: Baku, Azerbaijan; Venue: Baku Sport Hall; Level: International Challenge; Prize: $15,000; Format: 32MS/32WS/32MD/32WD/32XD	Score: 13–21, 6–3 retired	
5 February	Azerbaijan International: Dates: 8 February – 11 February; Host: Baku, Azerbaijan; Venue: Baku Sport Hall; Level: International Challenge; Prize: $15,000; Format: 32MS/32WS/32MD/32WD/32XD	(India) Malvika Bansod	(India) Tanya Hemanth
5 February	Azerbaijan International: Dates: 8 February – 11 February; Host: Baku, Azerbaijan; Venue: Baku Sport Hall; Level: International Challenge; Prize: $15,000; Format: 32MS/32WS/32MD/32WD/32XD	Score: 21–15, 22–20	
5 February	Azerbaijan International: Dates: 8 February – 11 February; Host: Baku, Azerbaijan; Venue: Baku Sport Hall; Level: International Challenge; Prize: $15,000; Format: 32MS/32WS/32MD/32WD/32XD	(Czech Republic) Ondřej Král (Czech Republic) Adam Mendrek	(India) P. S. Ravikrishna (India) Sankar Prasad
5 February	Azerbaijan International: Dates: 8 February – 11 February; Host: Baku, Azerbaijan; Venue: Baku Sport Hall; Level: International Challenge; Prize: $15,000; Format: 32MS/32WS/32MD/32WD/32XD	Score: 21–14, 21–19	
5 February	Azerbaijan International: Dates: 8 February – 11 February; Host: Baku, Azerbaijan; Venue: Baku Sport Hall; Level: International Challenge; Prize: $15,000; Format: 32MS/32WS/32MD/32WD/32XD	(Bulgaria) Gabriela Stoeva (Bulgaria) Stefani Stoeva	(Canada) Catherine Choi (Canada) Josephine Wu
5 February	Azerbaijan International: Dates: 8 February – 11 February; Host: Baku, Azerbaijan; Venue: Baku Sport Hall; Level: International Challenge; Prize: $15,000; Format: 32MS/32WS/32MD/32WD/32XD	Score: 21–14, 21–7	
5 February	Azerbaijan International: Dates: 8 February – 11 February; Host: Baku, Azerbaijan; Venue: Baku Sport Hall; Level: International Challenge; Prize: $15,000; Format: 32MS/32WS/32MD/32WD/32XD	(India) Sathish Karunakaran (India) Aadya Variyath	(India) B. Sumeeth Reddy (India) N. Sikki Reddy
5 February	Azerbaijan International: Dates: 8 February – 11 February; Host: Baku, Azerbaijan; Venue: Baku Sport Hall; Level: International Challenge; Prize: $15,000; Format: 32MS/32WS/32MD/32WD/32XD	Score: 13–21, 22–20, 21–10	
12 February	Sri Lanka International: Dates: 13 February – 18 February; Host: Galle, Sri Lanka; Venue: District Sport Complex; Level: International Series; Prize: $5,000; Format: 64MS/32WS/32MD/32WD/32XD	(Canada) Xiaodong Sheng	(India) B. M. Rahul Bharadwaj
12 February	Sri Lanka International: Dates: 13 February – 18 February; Host: Galle, Sri Lanka; Venue: District Sport Complex; Level: International Series; Prize: $5,000; Format: 64MS/32WS/32MD/32WD/32XD	Score: 10–21, 21–19, 22–20	
12 February	Sri Lanka International: Dates: 13 February – 18 February; Host: Galle, Sri Lanka; Venue: District Sport Complex; Level: International Series; Prize: $5,000; Format: 64MS/32WS/32MD/32WD/32XD	(Indonesia) Ruzana	(Malaysia) Siti Zulaikha
12 February	Sri Lanka International: Dates: 13 February – 18 February; Host: Galle, Sri Lanka; Venue: District Sport Complex; Level: International Series; Prize: $5,000; Format: 64MS/32WS/32MD/32WD/32XD	Score: 21–19, 21–15	
12 February	Sri Lanka International: Dates: 13 February – 18 February; Host: Galle, Sri Lanka; Venue: District Sport Complex; Level: International Series; Prize: $5,000; Format: 64MS/32WS/32MD/32WD/32XD	(Thailand) Sirawit Sothon (Thailand) Natthapat Trinkajee	(Indonesia) Reza Dwicahya Purnama (Indonesia) Rian Canna Varo
12 February	Sri Lanka International: Dates: 13 February – 18 February; Host: Galle, Sri Lanka; Venue: District Sport Complex; Level: International Series; Prize: $5,000; Format: 64MS/32WS/32MD/32WD/32XD	Score: 21–19, 21–7	
12 February	Sri Lanka International: Dates: 13 February – 18 February; Host: Galle, Sri Lanka; Venue: District Sport Complex; Level: International Series; Prize: $5,000; Format: 64MS/32WS/32MD/32WD/32XD	(Thailand) Pichamon Phatcharaphisutsin (Thailand) Nannapas Sukklad	(Thailand) Prinda Pattanawaritthipan (Thailand) Atitaya Povanon
12 February	Sri Lanka International: Dates: 13 February – 18 February; Host: Galle, Sri Lanka; Venue: District Sport Complex; Level: International Series; Prize: $5,000; Format: 64MS/32WS/32MD/32WD/32XD	Score: 13–21, 21–16, 21–14	
12 February	Sri Lanka International: Dates: 13 February – 18 February; Host: Galle, Sri Lanka; Venue: District Sport Complex; Level: International Series; Prize: $5,000; Format: 64MS/32WS/32MD/32WD/32XD	(Thailand) Phatharathorn Nipornram (Thailand) Nattamon Laisuan	(Thailand) Neuaduang Mangkornloi (Thailand) Atitaya Povanon
12 February	Sri Lanka International: Dates: 13 February – 18 February; Host: Galle, Sri Lanka; Venue: District Sport Complex; Level: International Series; Prize: $5,000; Format: 64MS/32WS/32MD/32WD/32XD	Score: 21–11, 21–12	
12 February	Oceania Championships (Draw): Dates: 12 February – 15 February; Host: Geelong, Australia; Venue: Leisuretime Sports Precinct; Level: Continental Individual Championships; Format: 128MS/64WS/64MD/32WD/64XD	(New Zealand) Edward Lau	(Australia) Shrey Dhand
12 February	Oceania Championships (Draw): Dates: 12 February – 15 February; Host: Geelong, Australia; Venue: Leisuretime Sports Precinct; Level: Continental Individual Championships; Format: 128MS/64WS/64MD/32WD/64XD	Score: 21–15, 21–15	
12 February	Oceania Championships (Draw): Dates: 12 February – 15 February; Host: Geelong, Australia; Venue: Leisuretime Sports Precinct; Level: Continental Individual Championships; Format: 128MS/64WS/64MD/32WD/64XD	(Australia) Tiffany Ho	(Australia) Zhang Yuelin
12 February	Oceania Championships (Draw): Dates: 12 February – 15 February; Host: Geelong, Australia; Venue: Leisuretime Sports Precinct; Level: Continental Individual Championships; Format: 128MS/64WS/64MD/32WD/64XD	Score: 22–20, 21–12	
12 February	Oceania Championships (Draw): Dates: 12 February – 15 February; Host: Geelong, Australia; Venue: Leisuretime Sports Precinct; Level: Continental Individual Championships; Format: 128MS/64WS/64MD/32WD/64XD	(Australia) Lukas Defolky (Australia) Tang Huaidong	(New Zealand) Adam Jeffrey (New Zealand) Dylan Soedjasa
12 February	Oceania Championships (Draw): Dates: 12 February – 15 February; Host: Geelong, Australia; Venue: Leisuretime Sports Precinct; Level: Continental Individual Championships; Format: 128MS/64WS/64MD/32WD/64XD	Score: 21–13, 21–17	
12 February	Oceania Championships (Draw): Dates: 12 February – 15 February; Host: Geelong, Australia; Venue: Leisuretime Sports Precinct; Level: Continental Individual Championships; Format: 128MS/64WS/64MD/32WD/64XD	(Australia) Setyana Mapasa (Australia) Angela Yu	(Australia) Kaitlyn Ea (Australia) Gronya Somerville
12 February	Oceania Championships (Draw): Dates: 12 February – 15 February; Host: Geelong, Australia; Venue: Leisuretime Sports Precinct; Level: Continental Individual Championships; Format: 128MS/64WS/64MD/32WD/64XD	Score: 21–18, 21–11	
12 February	Oceania Championships (Draw): Dates: 12 February – 15 February; Host: Geelong, Australia; Venue: Leisuretime Sports Precinct; Level: Continental Individual Championships; Format: 128MS/64WS/64MD/32WD/64XD	(Australia) Kenneth Choo (Australia) Gronya Somerville	(New Zealand) Edward Lau (New Zealand) Shaunna Li
12 February	Oceania Championships (Draw): Dates: 12 February – 15 February; Host: Geelong, Australia; Venue: Leisuretime Sports Precinct; Level: Continental Individual Championships; Format: 128MS/64WS/64MD/32WD/64XD	Score: 21–11, 25–27, 21–14	
12 February	All African Championships (Draw): Dates: 16 February – 18 February; Host: Cairo, Egypt; Venue: Cairo Stadium Indoor Halls Complex; Level: Continental Individual Championships; Format: 64MS/32WS/32MD/16WD/32XD	(Nigeria) Anuoluwapo Juwon Opeyori	(Mauritius) Julien Paul
12 February	All African Championships (Draw): Dates: 16 February – 18 February; Host: Cairo, Egypt; Venue: Cairo Stadium Indoor Halls Complex; Level: Continental Individual Championships; Format: 64MS/32WS/32MD/16WD/32XD	Score: 23–21, 11–21, 21–16	
12 February	All African Championships (Draw): Dates: 16 February – 18 February; Host: Cairo, Egypt; Venue: Cairo Stadium Indoor Halls Complex; Level: Continental Individual Championships; Format: 64MS/32WS/32MD/16WD/32XD	(Mauritius) Kate Ludik	(Uganda) Fadilah Mohamed Rafi
12 February	All African Championships (Draw): Dates: 16 February – 18 February; Host: Cairo, Egypt; Venue: Cairo Stadium Indoor Halls Complex; Level: Continental Individual Championships; Format: 64MS/32WS/32MD/16WD/32XD	Score: walkover	
12 February	All African Championships (Draw): Dates: 16 February – 18 February; Host: Cairo, Egypt; Venue: Cairo Stadium Indoor Halls Complex; Level: Continental Individual Championships; Format: 64MS/32WS/32MD/16WD/32XD	(Algeria) Koceila Mammeri (Algeria) Youcef Sabri Medel	(Nigeria) Nusa Momoh (Nigeria) Godwin Olofua
12 February	All African Championships (Draw): Dates: 16 February – 18 February; Host: Cairo, Egypt; Venue: Cairo Stadium Indoor Halls Complex; Level: Continental Individual Championships; Format: 64MS/32WS/32MD/16WD/32XD	Score: 21–12, 21–8	
12 February	All African Championships (Draw): Dates: 16 February – 18 February; Host: Cairo, Egypt; Venue: Cairo Stadium Indoor Halls Complex; Level: Continental Individual Championships; Format: 64MS/32WS/32MD/16WD/32XD	(South Africa) Amy Ackerman (South Africa) Deidré Laurens	(Uganda) Husina Kobugabe (Uganda) Gladys Mbabazi
12 February	All African Championships (Draw): Dates: 16 February – 18 February; Host: Cairo, Egypt; Venue: Cairo Stadium Indoor Halls Complex; Level: Continental Individual Championships; Format: 64MS/32WS/32MD/16WD/32XD	Score: 21–11, 21–15	
12 February	All African Championships (Draw): Dates: 16 February – 18 February; Host: Cairo, Egypt; Venue: Cairo Stadium Indoor Halls Complex; Level: Continental Individual Championships; Format: 64MS/32WS/32MD/16WD/32XD	(Algeria) Koceila Mammeri (Algeria) Tanina Mammeri	(Egypt) Adham Hatem Elgamal (Egypt) Doha Hany
12 February	All African Championships (Draw): Dates: 16 February – 18 February; Host: Cairo, Egypt; Venue: Cairo Stadium Indoor Halls Complex; Level: Continental Individual Championships; Format: 64MS/32WS/32MD/16WD/32XD	Score: 21–23, 21–16, 21–11	
12 February	All Africa Men's and Women's Team Championships (Draw): Dates: 12 February – 15 February; Host: Cairo, Egypt; Venue: Cairo Stadium Indoor Halls Complex; Level: Continental Team Championships; Format: 8MT/7WT	Algeria	Nigeria
12 February	All Africa Men's and Women's Team Championships (Draw): Dates: 12 February – 15 February; Host: Cairo, Egypt; Venue: Cairo Stadium Indoor Halls Complex; Level: Continental Team Championships; Format: 8MT/7WT	Koceila Mammeri	Victor Ikechukwu
12 February	All Africa Men's and Women's Team Championships (Draw): Dates: 12 February – 15 February; Host: Cairo, Egypt; Venue: Cairo Stadium Indoor Halls Complex; Level: Continental Team Championships; Format: 8MT/7WT	Youcef Sabri Medel	Anuoluwapo Juwon Opeyori
12 February	All Africa Men's and Women's Team Championships (Draw): Dates: 12 February – 15 February; Host: Cairo, Egypt; Venue: Cairo Stadium Indoor Halls Complex; Level: Continental Team Championships; Format: 8MT/7WT	Adel Hamek	Godwin Olofua
12 February	All Africa Men's and Women's Team Championships (Draw): Dates: 12 February – 15 February; Host: Cairo, Egypt; Venue: Cairo Stadium Indoor Halls Complex; Level: Continental Team Championships; Format: 8MT/7WT	Mohamed Abderrahime Belarbi; Youcef Sabri Medel	Joseph Emmanuel Emmy; Victor Ikechukwu
12 February	All Africa Men's and Women's Team Championships (Draw): Dates: 12 February – 15 February; Host: Cairo, Egypt; Venue: Cairo Stadium Indoor Halls Complex; Level: Continental Team Championships; Format: 8MT/7WT	Adel Hamek; Koceila Mammeri	Godwin Olofua; Anuoluwapo Juwon Opeyori
12 February	All Africa Men's and Women's Team Championships (Draw): Dates: 12 February – 15 February; Host: Cairo, Egypt; Venue: Cairo Stadium Indoor Halls Complex; Level: Continental Team Championships; Format: 8MT/7WT	Score: 3–2	
12 February	All Africa Men's and Women's Team Championships (Draw): Dates: 12 February – 15 February; Host: Cairo, Egypt; Venue: Cairo Stadium Indoor Halls Complex; Level: Continental Team Championships; Format: 8MT/7WT	South Africa	Uganda
12 February	All Africa Men's and Women's Team Championships (Draw): Dates: 12 February – 15 February; Host: Cairo, Egypt; Venue: Cairo Stadium Indoor Halls Complex; Level: Continental Team Championships; Format: 8MT/7WT	Deidré Laurens	Gladys Mbabazi
12 February	All Africa Men's and Women's Team Championships (Draw): Dates: 12 February – 15 February; Host: Cairo, Egypt; Venue: Cairo Stadium Indoor Halls Complex; Level: Continental Team Championships; Format: 8MT/7WT	Diane Olivier	Husina Kobugabe
12 February	All Africa Men's and Women's Team Championships (Draw): Dates: 12 February – 15 February; Host: Cairo, Egypt; Venue: Cairo Stadium Indoor Halls Complex; Level: Continental Team Championships; Format: 8MT/7WT	Johanita Scholtz	Fadilah Mohamed Rafi
12 February	All Africa Men's and Women's Team Championships (Draw): Dates: 12 February – 15 February; Host: Cairo, Egypt; Venue: Cairo Stadium Indoor Halls Complex; Level: Continental Team Championships; Format: 8MT/7WT	Amy Ackerman; Deidré Laurens	Husina Kobugabe; Gladys Mbabazi
12 February	All Africa Men's and Women's Team Championships (Draw): Dates: 12 February – 15 February; Host: Cairo, Egypt; Venue: Cairo Stadium Indoor Halls Complex; Level: Continental Team Championships; Format: 8MT/7WT	Megan de Beer; Johanita Scholtz	Fadilah Mohamed Rafi; Tracy Naluwooza
12 February	All Africa Men's and Women's Team Championships (Draw): Dates: 12 February – 15 February; Host: Cairo, Egypt; Venue: Cairo Stadium Indoor Halls Complex; Level: Continental Team Championships; Format: 8MT/7WT	Score: 3–2	
12 February	Asia Team Championships (Draw): Dates: 13 February – 18 February; Host: Shah Alam, Malaysia; Venue: Setia City Convention Center; Level: Continental Team Championships; Format: 15MT/11WT	China	Malaysia
12 February	Asia Team Championships (Draw): Dates: 13 February – 18 February; Host: Shah Alam, Malaysia; Venue: Setia City Convention Center; Level: Continental Team Championships; Format: 15MT/11WT	Weng Hongyang	Leong Jun Hao
12 February	Asia Team Championships (Draw): Dates: 13 February – 18 February; Host: Shah Alam, Malaysia; Venue: Setia City Convention Center; Level: Continental Team Championships; Format: 15MT/11WT	Xie Haonan; Zeng Weihan	Aaron Chia; Soh Wooi Yik
12 February	Asia Team Championships (Draw): Dates: 13 February – 18 February; Host: Shah Alam, Malaysia; Venue: Setia City Convention Center; Level: Continental Team Championships; Format: 15MT/11WT	Lei Lanxi	Eogene Ewe
12 February	Asia Team Championships (Draw): Dates: 13 February – 18 February; Host: Shah Alam, Malaysia; Venue: Setia City Convention Center; Level: Continental Team Championships; Format: 15MT/11WT	Ren Xiangyu; Liu Yi	Goh Sze Fei; Nur Izzuddin
12 February	Asia Team Championships (Draw): Dates: 13 February – 18 February; Host: Shah Alam, Malaysia; Venue: Setia City Convention Center; Level: Continental Team Championships; Format: 15MT/11WT	Wang Zhengxing	Muhammad Haikal
12 February	Asia Team Championships (Draw): Dates: 13 February – 18 February; Host: Shah Alam, Malaysia; Venue: Setia City Convention Center; Level: Continental Team Championships; Format: 15MT/11WT	Score: 3–0	
12 February	Asia Team Championships (Draw): Dates: 13 February – 18 February; Host: Shah Alam, Malaysia; Venue: Setia City Convention Center; Level: Continental Team Championships; Format: 15MT/11WT	India	Thailand
12 February	Asia Team Championships (Draw): Dates: 13 February – 18 February; Host: Shah Alam, Malaysia; Venue: Setia City Convention Center; Level: Continental Team Championships; Format: 15MT/11WT	P. V. Sindhu	Supanida Katethong
12 February	Asia Team Championships (Draw): Dates: 13 February – 18 February; Host: Shah Alam, Malaysia; Venue: Setia City Convention Center; Level: Continental Team Championships; Format: 15MT/11WT	Treesa Jolly; Gayatri Gopichand	Jongkolphan Kititharakul; Rawinda Prajongjai
12 February	Asia Team Championships (Draw): Dates: 13 February – 18 February; Host: Shah Alam, Malaysia; Venue: Setia City Convention Center; Level: Continental Team Championships; Format: 15MT/11WT	Ashmita Chaliha	Busanan Ongbamrungphan
12 February	Asia Team Championships (Draw): Dates: 13 February – 18 February; Host: Shah Alam, Malaysia; Venue: Setia City Convention Center; Level: Continental Team Championships; Format: 15MT/11WT	Priya Konjengbam; Shruti Mishra	Benyapa Aimsaard; Nuntakarn Aimsaard
12 February	Asia Team Championships (Draw): Dates: 13 February – 18 February; Host: Shah Alam, Malaysia; Venue: Setia City Convention Center; Level: Continental Team Championships; Format: 15MT/11WT	Anmol Kharb	Pornpicha Choeikeewong
12 February	Asia Team Championships (Draw): Dates: 13 February – 18 February; Host: Shah Alam, Malaysia; Venue: Setia City Convention Center; Level: Continental Team Championships; Format: 15MT/11WT	Score: 3–2	
12 February	European Men's and Women's Team Championships (Draw): Dates: 14 February – 18 February; Host: Łódź, Poland; Venue: Łódź Sport Arena im. Józefa; Level: Continental Team Championships; Format: 8MT/8WT	Denmark	France
12 February	European Men's and Women's Team Championships (Draw): Dates: 14 February – 18 February; Host: Łódź, Poland; Venue: Łódź Sport Arena im. Józefa; Level: Continental Team Championships; Format: 8MT/8WT	Anders Antonsen	Toma Junior Popov
12 February	European Men's and Women's Team Championships (Draw): Dates: 14 February – 18 February; Host: Łódź, Poland; Venue: Łódź Sport Arena im. Józefa; Level: Continental Team Championships; Format: 8MT/8WT	Kim Astrup; Anders Skaarup Rasmussen	Lucas Corvée; Ronan Labar
12 February	European Men's and Women's Team Championships (Draw): Dates: 14 February – 18 February; Host: Łódź, Poland; Venue: Łódź Sport Arena im. Józefa; Level: Continental Team Championships; Format: 8MT/8WT	Rasmus Gemke	Christo Popov
12 February	European Men's and Women's Team Championships (Draw): Dates: 14 February – 18 February; Host: Łódź, Poland; Venue: Łódź Sport Arena im. Józefa; Level: Continental Team Championships; Format: 8MT/8WT	Rasmus Kjær; Frederik Søgaard	Thom Gicquel; Toma Junior Popov
12 February	European Men's and Women's Team Championships (Draw): Dates: 14 February – 18 February; Host: Łódź, Poland; Venue: Łódź Sport Arena im. Józefa; Level: Continental Team Championships; Format: 8MT/8WT	Mads Christophersen	Arnaud Merklé
12 February	European Men's and Women's Team Championships (Draw): Dates: 14 February – 18 February; Host: Łódź, Poland; Venue: Łódź Sport Arena im. Józefa; Level: Continental Team Championships; Format: 8MT/8WT	Score: 3–0	
12 February	European Men's and Women's Team Championships (Draw): Dates: 14 February – 18 February; Host: Łódź, Poland; Venue: Łódź Sport Arena im. Józefa; Level: Continental Team Championships; Format: 8MT/8WT	Denmark	Spain
12 February	European Men's and Women's Team Championships (Draw): Dates: 14 February – 18 February; Host: Łódź, Poland; Venue: Łódź Sport Arena im. Józefa; Level: Continental Team Championships; Format: 8MT/8WT	Line Kjærsfeldt	Carolina Marín
12 February	European Men's and Women's Team Championships (Draw): Dates: 14 February – 18 February; Host: Łódź, Poland; Venue: Łódź Sport Arena im. Józefa; Level: Continental Team Championships; Format: 8MT/8WT	Mia Blichfeldt	Clara Azurmendi
12 February	European Men's and Women's Team Championships (Draw): Dates: 14 February – 18 February; Host: Łódź, Poland; Venue: Łódź Sport Arena im. Józefa; Level: Continental Team Championships; Format: 8MT/8WT	Line Christophersen	Beatriz Corrales
12 February	European Men's and Women's Team Championships (Draw): Dates: 14 February – 18 February; Host: Łódź, Poland; Venue: Łódź Sport Arena im. Józefa; Level: Continental Team Championships; Format: 8MT/8WT	Christine Busch; Amalie Magelund	Paula López; Lucía Rodríguez
12 February	European Men's and Women's Team Championships (Draw): Dates: 14 February – 18 February; Host: Łódź, Poland; Venue: Łódź Sport Arena im. Józefa; Level: Continental Team Championships; Format: 8MT/8WT	Maiken Fruergaard; Sara Thygesen	Clara Azurmendi; Beatriz Corrales
12 February	European Men's and Women's Team Championships (Draw): Dates: 14 February – 18 February; Host: Łódź, Poland; Venue: Łódź Sport Arena im. Józefa; Level: Continental Team Championships; Format: 8MT/8WT	Score: 3–1	
12 February	Pan American Male & Female Cup (Draw): Dates: 15 February – 18 February; Host: São Paulo, Brazil; Venue: Centro Paralimpico Brasilero; Level: Continental Team Championships; Format: 8MT/6WT	Canada	Brazil
12 February	Pan American Male & Female Cup (Draw): Dates: 15 February – 18 February; Host: São Paulo, Brazil; Venue: Centro Paralimpico Brasilero; Level: Continental Team Championships; Format: 8MT/6WT	Brian Yang	Ygor Coelho
12 February	Pan American Male & Female Cup (Draw): Dates: 15 February – 18 February; Host: São Paulo, Brazil; Venue: Centro Paralimpico Brasilero; Level: Continental Team Championships; Format: 8MT/6WT	Adam Dong; Nyl Yakura	Fabrício Farias; Davi Silva
12 February	Pan American Male & Female Cup (Draw): Dates: 15 February – 18 February; Host: São Paulo, Brazil; Venue: Centro Paralimpico Brasilero; Level: Continental Team Championships; Format: 8MT/6WT	Victor Lai	Jonathan Matias
12 February	Pan American Male & Female Cup (Draw): Dates: 15 February – 18 February; Host: São Paulo, Brazil; Venue: Centro Paralimpico Brasilero; Level: Continental Team Championships; Format: 8MT/6WT	Score: 3–0	
12 February	Pan American Male & Female Cup (Draw): Dates: 15 February – 18 February; Host: São Paulo, Brazil; Venue: Centro Paralimpico Brasilero; Level: Continental Team Championships; Format: 8MT/6WT	Canada	United States
12 February	Pan American Male & Female Cup (Draw): Dates: 15 February – 18 February; Host: São Paulo, Brazil; Venue: Centro Paralimpico Brasilero; Level: Continental Team Championships; Format: 8MT/6WT	Wen Yu Zhang	Esther Shi
12 February	Pan American Male & Female Cup (Draw): Dates: 15 February – 18 February; Host: São Paulo, Brazil; Venue: Centro Paralimpico Brasilero; Level: Continental Team Championships; Format: 8MT/6WT	Catherine Choi; Josephine Wu	Joline Siu; Kerry Xu
12 February	Pan American Male & Female Cup (Draw): Dates: 15 February – 18 February; Host: São Paulo, Brazil; Venue: Centro Paralimpico Brasilero; Level: Continental Team Championships; Format: 8MT/6WT	Rachel Chan	Ella Lin
12 February	Pan American Male & Female Cup (Draw): Dates: 15 February – 18 February; Host: São Paulo, Brazil; Venue: Centro Paralimpico Brasilero; Level: Continental Team Championships; Format: 8MT/6WT	Score: 3–0	
12 February	Oceania Men's and Women's Team Championships (Draw): Dates: 16 February – 18 February; Host: Geelong, Australia; Venue: Leisuretime Sports Precinct; Level: Continental Team Championships; Format: 5MT/4WT	Australia	New Zealand
12 February	Oceania Men's and Women's Team Championships (Draw): Dates: 16 February – 18 February; Host: Geelong, Australia; Venue: Leisuretime Sports Precinct; Level: Continental Team Championships; Format: 5MT/4WT	Kenneth Choo; Shrey Dhand; Asher Ooi; Jacob Schueler; Nathan Tang; Ricky Tang; Rayne Wang; Jordan Yang; Jack Yu; Frederick Zhao	Ricky Cheng; Raphael Chris Deloy; Daniel Hu; Adam Jeffrey; Avinash Shastri; Dylan Soedjasa; Ryan Tong; Jack Wang
12 February	Oceania Men's and Women's Team Championships (Draw): Dates: 16 February – 18 February; Host: Geelong, Australia; Venue: Leisuretime Sports Precinct; Level: Continental Team Championships; Format: 5MT/4WT	Score: Round robin	
12 February	Oceania Men's and Women's Team Championships (Draw): Dates: 16 February – 18 February; Host: Geelong, Australia; Venue: Leisuretime Sports Precinct; Level: Continental Team Championships; Format: 5MT/4WT	Australia	New Zealand
12 February	Oceania Men's and Women's Team Championships (Draw): Dates: 16 February – 18 February; Host: Geelong, Australia; Venue: Leisuretime Sports Precinct; Level: Continental Team Championships; Format: 5MT/4WT	Kaitlyn Ea; Tiffany Ho; Setyana Mapasa; Dania Nugroho; Gronya Somerville; Catrina Tan; Bernice Teoh; Sydney Tjonadi; Isabella Yan; Angela Yu	Roanne Apalisok; Erena Calder-Hawkins; Liu Yanxi; Anona Pak; Justine Villegas; Josephine Zhao; Camellia Zhou; Jenny Zhu
12 February	Oceania Men's and Women's Team Championships (Draw): Dates: 16 February – 18 February; Host: Geelong, Australia; Venue: Leisuretime Sports Precinct; Level: Continental Team Championships; Format: 5MT/4WT	Score: Round robin	
19 February	Uganda International: Dates: 21 February – 25 February; Host: Kampala, Uganda; Venue: Lugogo Stadium; Level: International Challenge; Prize: $15,000; Format: 32MS/32WS/32MD/32WD/32XD	(Vietnam) Lê Đức Phát	(India) Raghu Mariswamy
19 February	Uganda International: Dates: 21 February – 25 February; Host: Kampala, Uganda; Venue: Lugogo Stadium; Level: International Challenge; Prize: $15,000; Format: 32MS/32WS/32MD/32WD/32XD	Score: 21–18, 21–14	
19 February	Uganda International: Dates: 21 February – 25 February; Host: Kampala, Uganda; Venue: Lugogo Stadium; Level: International Challenge; Prize: $15,000; Format: 32MS/32WS/32MD/32WD/32XD	(India) Aakarshi Kashyap	(India) Shruti Mundada
19 February	Uganda International: Dates: 21 February – 25 February; Host: Kampala, Uganda; Venue: Lugogo Stadium; Level: International Challenge; Prize: $15,000; Format: 32MS/32WS/32MD/32WD/32XD	Score: 25–23, 21–18	
19 February	Uganda International: Dates: 21 February – 25 February; Host: Kampala, Uganda; Venue: Lugogo Stadium; Level: International Challenge; Prize: $15,000; Format: 32MS/32WS/32MD/32WD/32XD	(India) Arjun M. R. (India) Dhruv Kapila	(United States) Vinson Chiu (United States) Joshua Yuan
19 February	Uganda International: Dates: 21 February – 25 February; Host: Kampala, Uganda; Venue: Lugogo Stadium; Level: International Challenge; Prize: $15,000; Format: 32MS/32WS/32MD/32WD/32XD	Score: 21–14, 21–13	
19 February	Uganda International: Dates: 21 February – 25 February; Host: Kampala, Uganda; Venue: Lugogo Stadium; Level: International Challenge; Prize: $15,000; Format: 32MS/32WS/32MD/32WD/32XD	(United States) Paula Lynn Cao Hok (United States) Lauren Lam	(United States) Francesca Corbett (United States) Allison Lee
19 February	Uganda International: Dates: 21 February – 25 February; Host: Kampala, Uganda; Venue: Lugogo Stadium; Level: International Challenge; Prize: $15,000; Format: 32MS/32WS/32MD/32WD/32XD	Score: 19–21, 21–18, 21–15	
19 February	Uganda International: Dates: 21 February – 25 February; Host: Kampala, Uganda; Venue: Lugogo Stadium; Level: International Challenge; Prize: $15,000; Format: 32MS/32WS/32MD/32WD/32XD	(India) Sathish Karunakaran (India) Aadya Variyath	(Australia) Kenneth Choo (Australia) Gronya Somerville
19 February	Uganda International: Dates: 21 February – 25 February; Host: Kampala, Uganda; Venue: Lugogo Stadium; Level: International Challenge; Prize: $15,000; Format: 32MS/32WS/32MD/32WD/32XD	Score: 22–20, 18–21, 21–19	
26 February	German Open (Draw): Dates: 27 February – 3 March; Host: Mülheim, Germany; Venue: Westenergie Sporthalle; Level: Super 300; Prize: $210,000; Format: 32MS/32WS/32MD/32WD/32XD	(France) Christo Popov	(Denmark) Rasmus Gemke
26 February	German Open (Draw): Dates: 27 February – 3 March; Host: Mülheim, Germany; Venue: Westenergie Sporthalle; Level: Super 300; Prize: $210,000; Format: 32MS/32WS/32MD/32WD/32XD	Score: 21–17, 21–16	
26 February	German Open (Draw): Dates: 27 February – 3 March; Host: Mülheim, Germany; Venue: Westenergie Sporthalle; Level: Super 300; Prize: $210,000; Format: 32MS/32WS/32MD/32WD/32XD	(Denmark) Mia Blichfeldt	(Vietnam) Nguyễn Thùy Linh
26 February	German Open (Draw): Dates: 27 February – 3 March; Host: Mülheim, Germany; Venue: Westenergie Sporthalle; Level: Super 300; Prize: $210,000; Format: 32MS/32WS/32MD/32WD/32XD	Score: 21–11, 21–9	
26 February	German Open (Draw): Dates: 27 February – 3 March; Host: Mülheim, Germany; Venue: Westenergie Sporthalle; Level: Super 300; Prize: $210,000; Format: 32MS/32WS/32MD/32WD/32XD	(Chinese Taipei) Lee Jhe-huei (Chinese Taipei) Yang Po-hsuan	(China) He Jiting (China) Ren Xiangyu
26 February	German Open (Draw): Dates: 27 February – 3 March; Host: Mülheim, Germany; Venue: Westenergie Sporthalle; Level: Super 300; Prize: $210,000; Format: 32MS/32WS/32MD/32WD/32XD	Score: 15–21, 23–21, 23–21	
26 February	German Open (Draw): Dates: 27 February – 3 March; Host: Mülheim, Germany; Venue: Westenergie Sporthalle; Level: Super 300; Prize: $210,000; Format: 32MS/32WS/32MD/32WD/32XD	(China) Li Yijing (China) Luo Xumin	(Bulgaria) Gabriela Stoeva (Bulgaria) Stefani Stoeva
26 February	German Open (Draw): Dates: 27 February – 3 March; Host: Mülheim, Germany; Venue: Westenergie Sporthalle; Level: Super 300; Prize: $210,000; Format: 32MS/32WS/32MD/32WD/32XD	Score: 21–7, 13–21, 21–18	
26 February	German Open (Draw): Dates: 27 February – 3 March; Host: Mülheim, Germany; Venue: Westenergie Sporthalle; Level: Super 300; Prize: $210,000; Format: 32MS/32WS/32MD/32WD/32XD	(Hong Kong) Tang Chun Man (Hong Kong) Tse Ying Suet	(South Korea) Kim Won-ho (South Korea) Jeong Na-eun
26 February	German Open (Draw): Dates: 27 February – 3 March; Host: Mülheim, Germany; Venue: Westenergie Sporthalle; Level: Super 300; Prize: $210,000; Format: 32MS/32WS/32MD/32WD/32XD	Score: 21–13, 21–19	

=== March ===
Week commencing	Tournament	Champions	Runners-up
4 March	African Games (Draw) (cancelled) (Note: This tournament, originally to be played on 4–7 March, was cancelled due to undisclosed reasons.): Dates: 4 March – 7 March; Host: Accra, Ghana; Venue: Borteyman Sports Complex; Level: Continental Team Championships; Format: TBC		
4 March	African Games (Draw) (cancelled): Dates: 4 March – 7 March; Host: Accra, Ghana; Venue: Borteyman Sports Complex; Level: Continental Team Championships; Format: TBC	Score:	
4 March	French Open (Draw): Dates: 5 March – 10 March; Host: Paris, France; Venue: Adidas Arena; Level: Super 750; Prize: $850,000; Format: 32MS/32WS/32MD/32WD/32XD	(China) Shi Yuqi	(Thailand) Kunlavut Vitidsarn
4 March	French Open (Draw): Dates: 5 March – 10 March; Host: Paris, France; Venue: Adidas Arena; Level: Super 750; Prize: $850,000; Format: 32MS/32WS/32MD/32WD/32XD	Score: 22–20, 21–19	
4 March	French Open (Draw): Dates: 5 March – 10 March; Host: Paris, France; Venue: Adidas Arena; Level: Super 750; Prize: $850,000; Format: 32MS/32WS/32MD/32WD/32XD	(South Korea) An Se-young	(Japan) Akane Yamaguchi
4 March	French Open (Draw): Dates: 5 March – 10 March; Host: Paris, France; Venue: Adidas Arena; Level: Super 750; Prize: $850,000; Format: 32MS/32WS/32MD/32WD/32XD	Score: 18–21, 21–13, 21–10	
4 March	French Open (Draw): Dates: 5 March – 10 March; Host: Paris, France; Venue: Adidas Arena; Level: Super 750; Prize: $850,000; Format: 32MS/32WS/32MD/32WD/32XD	(India) Satwiksairaj Rankireddy (India) Chirag Shetty	(Chinese Taipei) Lee Jhe-huei (Chinese Taipei) Yang Po-hsuan
4 March	French Open (Draw): Dates: 5 March – 10 March; Host: Paris, France; Venue: Adidas Arena; Level: Super 750; Prize: $850,000; Format: 32MS/32WS/32MD/32WD/32XD	Score: 21–11, 21–17	
4 March	French Open (Draw): Dates: 5 March – 10 March; Host: Paris, France; Venue: Adidas Arena; Level: Super 750; Prize: $850,000; Format: 32MS/32WS/32MD/32WD/32XD	(China) Chen Qingchen (China) Jia Yifan	(Japan) Nami Matsuyama (Japan) Chiharu Shida
4 March	French Open (Draw): Dates: 5 March – 10 March; Host: Paris, France; Venue: Adidas Arena; Level: Super 750; Prize: $850,000; Format: 32MS/32WS/32MD/32WD/32XD	Score: 21–12, 19–21, 24–22	
4 March	French Open (Draw): Dates: 5 March – 10 March; Host: Paris, France; Venue: Adidas Arena; Level: Super 750; Prize: $850,000; Format: 32MS/32WS/32MD/32WD/32XD	(China) Feng Yanzhe (China) Huang Dongping	(South Korea) Seo Seung-jae (South Korea) Chae Yoo-jung
4 March	French Open (Draw): Dates: 5 March – 10 March; Host: Paris, France; Venue: Adidas Arena; Level: Super 750; Prize: $850,000; Format: 32MS/32WS/32MD/32WD/32XD	Score: 21–16, 21–16	
4 March	Portugal International: Dates: 6 March – 10 March; Host: Caldas da Rainha, Portugal; Venue: Badminton High Performance Sports Centre; Level: International Series; Prize: $10,000; Format: 32MS/32WS/32MD/32WD/32XD	(Finland) Joakim Oldorff	(Chinese Taipei) Liao Jhuo-fu
4 March	Portugal International: Dates: 6 March – 10 March; Host: Caldas da Rainha, Portugal; Venue: Badminton High Performance Sports Centre; Level: International Series; Prize: $10,000; Format: 32MS/32WS/32MD/32WD/32XD	Score: 21–18, 13–6 retired	
4 March	Portugal International: Dates: 6 March – 10 March; Host: Caldas da Rainha, Portugal; Venue: Badminton High Performance Sports Centre; Level: International Series; Prize: $10,000; Format: 32MS/32WS/32MD/32WD/32XD	(India) Devika Sihag	(Canada) Rachel Chan
4 March	Portugal International: Dates: 6 March – 10 March; Host: Caldas da Rainha, Portugal; Venue: Badminton High Performance Sports Centre; Level: International Series; Prize: $10,000; Format: 32MS/32WS/32MD/32WD/32XD	Score: 21–16, 21–16	
4 March	Portugal International: Dates: 6 March – 10 March; Host: Caldas da Rainha, Portugal; Venue: Badminton High Performance Sports Centre; Level: International Series; Prize: $10,000; Format: 32MS/32WS/32MD/32WD/32XD	(Chinese Taipei) Chen Zhi-ray (Chinese Taipei) Lin Yu-chieh	(Chinese Taipei) Chen Cheng-kuan (Chinese Taipei) Chen Sheng-fa
4 March	Portugal International: Dates: 6 March – 10 March; Host: Caldas da Rainha, Portugal; Venue: Badminton High Performance Sports Centre; Level: International Series; Prize: $10,000; Format: 32MS/32WS/32MD/32WD/32XD	Score: 21–18, 21–16	
4 March	Portugal International: Dates: 6 March – 10 March; Host: Caldas da Rainha, Portugal; Venue: Badminton High Performance Sports Centre; Level: International Series; Prize: $10,000; Format: 32MS/32WS/32MD/32WD/32XD	(England) Chloe Birch (England) Estelle van Leeuwen	(England) Abbygael Harris (England) Annie Lado
4 March	Portugal International: Dates: 6 March – 10 March; Host: Caldas da Rainha, Portugal; Venue: Badminton High Performance Sports Centre; Level: International Series; Prize: $10,000; Format: 32MS/32WS/32MD/32WD/32XD	Score: 21–16, 21–9	
4 March	Portugal International: Dates: 6 March – 10 March; Host: Caldas da Rainha, Portugal; Venue: Badminton High Performance Sports Centre; Level: International Series; Prize: $10,000; Format: 32MS/32WS/32MD/32WD/32XD	(England) Ethan van Leeuwen (England) Chloe Birch	(England) Rory Easton (England) Lizzie Tolman
4 March	Portugal International: Dates: 6 March – 10 March; Host: Caldas da Rainha, Portugal; Venue: Badminton High Performance Sports Centre; Level: International Series; Prize: $10,000; Format: 32MS/32WS/32MD/32WD/32XD	Score: 18–21, 21–6, 21–17	
4 March	African Games (Draw): Dates: 7 March – 10 March; Host: Accra, Ghana, Ghana; Venue: Borteyman Sports Complex; Level: Continental Individual Championships; Format: 64MS/64WS/32MD/32WD/32XD	(Nigeria) Anuoluwapo Juwon Opeyori	(Nigeria) Godwin Olofua
4 March	African Games (Draw): Dates: 7 March – 10 March; Host: Accra, Ghana, Ghana; Venue: Borteyman Sports Complex; Level: Continental Individual Championships; Format: 64MS/64WS/32MD/32WD/32XD	Score: 21–23, 21–17, 21–15	
4 March	African Games (Draw): Dates: 7 March – 10 March; Host: Accra, Ghana, Ghana; Venue: Borteyman Sports Complex; Level: Continental Individual Championships; Format: 64MS/64WS/32MD/32WD/32XD	(South Africa) Johanita Scholtz	(Uganda) Husina Kobugabe
4 March	African Games (Draw): Dates: 7 March – 10 March; Host: Accra, Ghana, Ghana; Venue: Borteyman Sports Complex; Level: Continental Individual Championships; Format: 64MS/64WS/32MD/32WD/32XD	Score: 16–21, 21–17, 21–19	
4 March	African Games (Draw): Dates: 7 March – 10 March; Host: Accra, Ghana, Ghana; Venue: Borteyman Sports Complex; Level: Continental Individual Championships; Format: 64MS/64WS/32MD/32WD/32XD	(Algeria) Koceila Mammeri (Algeria) Youcef Sabri Medel	(Nigeria) Godwin Olofua (Nigeria) Anuoluwapo Juwon Opeyori
4 March	African Games (Draw): Dates: 7 March – 10 March; Host: Accra, Ghana, Ghana; Venue: Borteyman Sports Complex; Level: Continental Individual Championships; Format: 64MS/64WS/32MD/32WD/32XD	Score: 21–6, 21–15	
4 March	African Games (Draw): Dates: 7 March – 10 March; Host: Accra, Ghana, Ghana; Venue: Borteyman Sports Complex; Level: Continental Individual Championships; Format: 64MS/64WS/32MD/32WD/32XD	(Uganda) Husina Kobugabe (Uganda) Gladys Mbabazi	(Algeria) Halla Bouksani (Algeria) Tanina Mammeri
4 March	African Games (Draw): Dates: 7 March – 10 March; Host: Accra, Ghana, Ghana; Venue: Borteyman Sports Complex; Level: Continental Individual Championships; Format: 64MS/64WS/32MD/32WD/32XD	Score: 23–21, 21–14	
4 March	African Games (Draw): Dates: 7 March – 10 March; Host: Accra, Ghana, Ghana; Venue: Borteyman Sports Complex; Level: Continental Individual Championships; Format: 64MS/64WS/32MD/32WD/32XD	(Algeria) Koceila Mammeri (Algeria) Tanina Mammeri	(Egypt) Adham Hatem Elgamal (Egypt) Doha Hany
4 March	African Games (Draw): Dates: 7 March – 10 March; Host: Accra, Ghana, Ghana; Venue: Borteyman Sports Complex; Level: Continental Individual Championships; Format: 64MS/64WS/32MD/32WD/32XD	Score: 21–11, 21–15	
11 March	All England Open (Draw): Dates: 12 March – 17 March; Host: Birmingham, England; Venue: Utilita Arena Birmingham; Level: Super 1000; Prize: $1,300,000; Format: 32MS/32WS/32MD/32WD/32XD	(Indonesia) Jonatan Christie	(Indonesia) Anthony Sinisuka Ginting
11 March	All England Open (Draw): Dates: 12 March – 17 March; Host: Birmingham, England; Venue: Utilita Arena Birmingham; Level: Super 1000; Prize: $1,300,000; Format: 32MS/32WS/32MD/32WD/32XD	Score: 21–15, 21–14	
11 March	All England Open (Draw): Dates: 12 March – 17 March; Host: Birmingham, England; Venue: Utilita Arena Birmingham; Level: Super 1000; Prize: $1,300,000; Format: 32MS/32WS/32MD/32WD/32XD	(Spain) Carolina Marín	(Japan) Akane Yamaguchi
11 March	All England Open (Draw): Dates: 12 March – 17 March; Host: Birmingham, England; Venue: Utilita Arena Birmingham; Level: Super 1000; Prize: $1,300,000; Format: 32MS/32WS/32MD/32WD/32XD	Score: 26–24, 11–1 retired	
11 March	All England Open (Draw): Dates: 12 March – 17 March; Host: Birmingham, England; Venue: Utilita Arena Birmingham; Level: Super 1000; Prize: $1,300,000; Format: 32MS/32WS/32MD/32WD/32XD	(Indonesia) Fajar Alfian (Indonesia) Muhammad Rian Ardianto	(Malaysia) Aaron Chia (Malaysia) Soh Wooi Yik
11 March	All England Open (Draw): Dates: 12 March – 17 March; Host: Birmingham, England; Venue: Utilita Arena Birmingham; Level: Super 1000; Prize: $1,300,000; Format: 32MS/32WS/32MD/32WD/32XD	Score: 21–16, 21–16	
11 March	All England Open (Draw): Dates: 12 March – 17 March; Host: Birmingham, England; Venue: Utilita Arena Birmingham; Level: Super 1000; Prize: $1,300,000; Format: 32MS/32WS/32MD/32WD/32XD	(South Korea) Baek Ha-na (South Korea) Lee So-hee	(Japan) Nami Matsuyama (Japan) Chiharu Shida
11 March	All England Open (Draw): Dates: 12 March – 17 March; Host: Birmingham, England; Venue: Utilita Arena Birmingham; Level: Super 1000; Prize: $1,300,000; Format: 32MS/32WS/32MD/32WD/32XD	Score: 21–19, 11–21, 21–17	
11 March	All England Open (Draw): Dates: 12 March – 17 March; Host: Birmingham, England; Venue: Utilita Arena Birmingham; Level: Super 1000; Prize: $1,300,000; Format: 32MS/32WS/32MD/32WD/32XD	(China) Zheng Siwei (China) Huang Yaqiong	(Japan) Yuta Watanabe (Japan) Arisa Higashino
11 March	All England Open (Draw): Dates: 12 March – 17 March; Host: Birmingham, England; Venue: Utilita Arena Birmingham; Level: Super 1000; Prize: $1,300,000; Format: 32MS/32WS/32MD/32WD/32XD	Score: 21–16, 21–11	
11 March	Orléans Masters (Draw): Dates: 12 March – 17 March; Host: Orléans, France; Venue: Palais des Sports; Level: Super 300; Prize: $210,000; Format: 32MS/32WS/32MD/32WD/32XD	(Japan) Yushi Tanaka	(Japan) Koo Takahashi
11 March	Orléans Masters (Draw): Dates: 12 March – 17 March; Host: Orléans, France; Venue: Palais des Sports; Level: Super 300; Prize: $210,000; Format: 32MS/32WS/32MD/32WD/32XD	Score: 21–18, 21–10	
11 March	Orléans Masters (Draw): Dates: 12 March – 17 March; Host: Orléans, France; Venue: Palais des Sports; Level: Super 300; Prize: $210,000; Format: 32MS/32WS/32MD/32WD/32XD	(Japan) Tomoka Miyazaki	(Japan) Hina Akechi
11 March	Orléans Masters (Draw): Dates: 12 March – 17 March; Host: Orléans, France; Venue: Palais des Sports; Level: Super 300; Prize: $210,000; Format: 32MS/32WS/32MD/32WD/32XD	Score: 21–18, 21–12	
11 March	Orléans Masters (Draw): Dates: 12 March – 17 March; Host: Orléans, France; Venue: Palais des Sports; Level: Super 300; Prize: $210,000; Format: 32MS/32WS/32MD/32WD/32XD	(Malaysia) Choong Hon Jian (Malaysia) Muhammad Haikal	(Indonesia) Sabar Karyaman Gutama (Indonesia) Muhammad Reza Pahlevi Isfahani
11 March	Orléans Masters (Draw): Dates: 12 March – 17 March; Host: Orléans, France; Venue: Palais des Sports; Level: Super 300; Prize: $210,000; Format: 32MS/32WS/32MD/32WD/32XD	Score: 21–15, 18–21, 21–14	
11 March	Orléans Masters (Draw): Dates: 12 March – 17 March; Host: Orléans, France; Venue: Palais des Sports; Level: Super 300; Prize: $210,000; Format: 32MS/32WS/32MD/32WD/32XD	(Indonesia) Meilysa Trias Puspita Sari (Indonesia) Rachel Allessya Rose	(Japan) Rui Hirokami (Japan) Yuna Kato
11 March	Orléans Masters (Draw): Dates: 12 March – 17 March; Host: Orléans, France; Venue: Palais des Sports; Level: Super 300; Prize: $210,000; Format: 32MS/32WS/32MD/32WD/32XD	Score: 21–12, 21–18	
11 March	Orléans Masters (Draw): Dates: 12 March – 17 March; Host: Orléans, France; Venue: Palais des Sports; Level: Super 300; Prize: $210,000; Format: 32MS/32WS/32MD/32WD/32XD	(China) Cheng Xing (China) Zhang Chi	(Indonesia) Rinov Rivaldy (Indonesia) Pitha Haningtyas Mentari
11 March	Orléans Masters (Draw): Dates: 12 March – 17 March; Host: Orléans, France; Venue: Palais des Sports; Level: Super 300; Prize: $210,000; Format: 32MS/32WS/32MD/32WD/32XD	Score: 16–21, 21–18, 21–15	
11 March	Vietnam International: Dates: 12 March – 17 March; Host: Hanoi, Vietnam; Venue: Tay Ho District Stadium; Level: International Challenge; Prize: $15,000; Format: 64MS/32WS/32MD/32WD/32XD	(Chinese Taipei) Huang Ping-hsien	(South Korea) Cho Geon-yeop
11 March	Vietnam International: Dates: 12 March – 17 March; Host: Hanoi, Vietnam; Venue: Tay Ho District Stadium; Level: International Challenge; Prize: $15,000; Format: 64MS/32WS/32MD/32WD/32XD	Score: 21–23, 21–12, 21–16	
11 March	Vietnam International: Dates: 12 March – 17 March; Host: Hanoi, Vietnam; Venue: Tay Ho District Stadium; Level: International Challenge; Prize: $15,000; Format: 64MS/32WS/32MD/32WD/32XD	(South Korea) Sim Yu-jin	(South Korea) Kim Ga-ram
11 March	Vietnam International: Dates: 12 March – 17 March; Host: Hanoi, Vietnam; Venue: Tay Ho District Stadium; Level: International Challenge; Prize: $15,000; Format: 64MS/32WS/32MD/32WD/32XD	Score: 21–9, 15–21, 21–18	
11 March	Vietnam International: Dates: 12 March – 17 March; Host: Hanoi, Vietnam; Venue: Tay Ho District Stadium; Level: International Challenge; Prize: $15,000; Format: 64MS/32WS/32MD/32WD/32XD	(Chinese Taipei) Chiu Hsiang-chieh (Chinese Taipei) Liu Kuang-heng	(Chinese Taipei) Chiang Chien-wei (Chinese Taipei) Wu Hsuan-yi
11 March	Vietnam International: Dates: 12 March – 17 March; Host: Hanoi, Vietnam; Venue: Tay Ho District Stadium; Level: International Challenge; Prize: $15,000; Format: 64MS/32WS/32MD/32WD/32XD	Score: 21–12, 15–21, 21–15	
11 March	Vietnam International: Dates: 12 March – 17 March; Host: Hanoi, Vietnam; Venue: Tay Ho District Stadium; Level: International Challenge; Prize: $15,000; Format: 64MS/32WS/32MD/32WD/32XD	(Thailand) Laksika Kanlaha (Thailand) Phataimas Muenwong	(Japan) Kokona Ishikawa (Japan) Mio Konegawa
11 March	Vietnam International: Dates: 12 March – 17 March; Host: Hanoi, Vietnam; Venue: Tay Ho District Stadium; Level: International Challenge; Prize: $15,000; Format: 64MS/32WS/32MD/32WD/32XD	Score: 21–19, 21–14	
11 March	Vietnam International: Dates: 12 March – 17 March; Host: Hanoi, Vietnam; Venue: Tay Ho District Stadium; Level: International Challenge; Prize: $15,000; Format: 64MS/32WS/32MD/32WD/32XD	(Thailand) Pakkapon Teeraratsakul (Thailand) Phataimas Muenwong	(Indonesia) Amri Syahnawi (Indonesia) Indah Cahya Sari Jamil
11 March	Vietnam International: Dates: 12 March – 17 March; Host: Hanoi, Vietnam; Venue: Tay Ho District Stadium; Level: International Challenge; Prize: $15,000; Format: 64MS/32WS/32MD/32WD/32XD	Score: 21–19, 21–12	
11 March	Dutch International: Dates: 14 March – 17 March; Host: Wateringen, Netherlands; Venue: VELO Hall; Level: International Series; Prize: $10,000; Format: 32MS/32WS/32MD/32WD/32XD	(Denmark) Mads Juel Møller	(Sweden) Andi Fadel Muhammad
11 March	Dutch International: Dates: 14 March – 17 March; Host: Wateringen, Netherlands; Venue: VELO Hall; Level: International Series; Prize: $10,000; Format: 32MS/32WS/32MD/32WD/32XD	Score: 21–17, 21–15	
11 March	Dutch International: Dates: 14 March – 17 March; Host: Wateringen, Netherlands; Venue: VELO Hall; Level: International Series; Prize: $10,000; Format: 32MS/32WS/32MD/32WD/32XD	(India) Isharani Baruah	(India) Devika Sihag
11 March	Dutch International: Dates: 14 March – 17 March; Host: Wateringen, Netherlands; Venue: VELO Hall; Level: International Series; Prize: $10,000; Format: 32MS/32WS/32MD/32WD/32XD	Score: 19–21, 23–21, 21–14	
11 March	Dutch International: Dates: 14 March – 17 March; Host: Wateringen, Netherlands; Venue: VELO Hall; Level: International Series; Prize: $10,000; Format: 32MS/32WS/32MD/32WD/32XD	(England) Rory Easton (England) Alex Green	(France) Louis Ducrot (France) Quentin Ronget
11 March	Dutch International: Dates: 14 March – 17 March; Host: Wateringen, Netherlands; Venue: VELO Hall; Level: International Series; Prize: $10,000; Format: 32MS/32WS/32MD/32WD/32XD	Score: 21–19, 25–23	
11 March	Dutch International: Dates: 14 March – 17 March; Host: Wateringen, Netherlands; Venue: VELO Hall; Level: International Series; Prize: $10,000; Format: 32MS/32WS/32MD/32WD/32XD	(India) K. Ashwini Bhat (India) Shikha Gautam	(Denmark) Anna-Sofie Nielsen (Denmark) Mette Werge
11 March	Dutch International: Dates: 14 March – 17 March; Host: Wateringen, Netherlands; Venue: VELO Hall; Level: International Series; Prize: $10,000; Format: 32MS/32WS/32MD/32WD/32XD	Score: 21–18, 21–14	
11 March	Dutch International: Dates: 14 March – 17 March; Host: Wateringen, Netherlands; Venue: VELO Hall; Level: International Series; Prize: $10,000; Format: 32MS/32WS/32MD/32WD/32XD	(England) Rory Easton (England) Lizzie Tolman	(Ukraine) Oleksii Titov (Ukraine) Yevheniia Kantemyr
11 March	Dutch International: Dates: 14 March – 17 March; Host: Wateringen, Netherlands; Venue: VELO Hall; Level: International Series; Prize: $10,000; Format: 32MS/32WS/32MD/32WD/32XD	Score: 21–13, 21–14	
11 March	Giraldilla International: Dates: 13 March – 17 March; Host: Havana, Cuba; Venue: Coliseo de la Ciudad Deportiva; Level: Future Series; Format: 32MS/32WS/16MD/16WD/32XD	(Jamaica) Samuel Ricketts	(Guatemala) Yeison del Cid
11 March	Giraldilla International: Dates: 13 March – 17 March; Host: Havana, Cuba; Venue: Coliseo de la Ciudad Deportiva; Level: Future Series; Format: 32MS/32WS/16MD/16WD/32XD	Score: 21–18, 7–21, 21–19	
11 March	Giraldilla International: Dates: 13 March – 17 March; Host: Havana, Cuba; Venue: Coliseo de la Ciudad Deportiva; Level: Future Series; Format: 32MS/32WS/16MD/16WD/32XD	(Cuba) Taymara Oropesa	(Guatemala) Nikté Sotomayor
11 March	Giraldilla International: Dates: 13 March – 17 March; Host: Havana, Cuba; Venue: Coliseo de la Ciudad Deportiva; Level: Future Series; Format: 32MS/32WS/16MD/16WD/32XD	Score: 21–14, 18–21, 21–11	
11 March	Giraldilla International: Dates: 13 March – 17 March; Host: Havana, Cuba; Venue: Coliseo de la Ciudad Deportiva; Level: Future Series; Format: 32MS/32WS/16MD/16WD/32XD	(Guatemala) Yeison del Cid (Guatemala) Christopher Martínez	(Guatemala) José Granados (Guatemala) Antonio Ortíz
11 March	Giraldilla International: Dates: 13 March – 17 March; Host: Havana, Cuba; Venue: Coliseo de la Ciudad Deportiva; Level: Future Series; Format: 32MS/32WS/16MD/16WD/32XD	Score: 20–22, 21–19, 21–14	
11 March	Giraldilla International: Dates: 13 March – 17 March; Host: Havana, Cuba; Venue: Coliseo de la Ciudad Deportiva; Level: Future Series; Format: 32MS/32WS/16MD/16WD/32XD	(Guatemala) Diana Corleto (Guatemala) Mariana Paiz	(Cuba) Taymara Oropesa (Brazil) Fabiana Silva
11 March	Giraldilla International: Dates: 13 March – 17 March; Host: Havana, Cuba; Venue: Coliseo de la Ciudad Deportiva; Level: Future Series; Format: 32MS/32WS/16MD/16WD/32XD	Score: 21–15, 19–21, 21–10	
11 March	Giraldilla International: Dates: 13 March – 17 March; Host: Havana, Cuba; Venue: Coliseo de la Ciudad Deportiva; Level: Future Series; Format: 32MS/32WS/16MD/16WD/32XD	(Guatemala) Christopher Martínez (Guatemala) Mariana Paiz	(Cuba) Roberto Herrera (Cuba) Leyanis Contreras
11 March	Giraldilla International: Dates: 13 March – 17 March; Host: Havana, Cuba; Venue: Coliseo de la Ciudad Deportiva; Level: Future Series; Format: 32MS/32WS/16MD/16WD/32XD	Score: 21–12, 21–13	
18 March	Swiss Open (Draw): Dates: 19 March – 24 March; Host: Basel, Switzerland; Venue: St. Jakobshalle; Level: Super 300; Prize: $210,000; Format: 32MS/32WS/32MD/32WD/32XD	(Chinese Taipei) Lin Chun-yi	(Chinese Taipei) Chou Tien-chen
18 March	Swiss Open (Draw): Dates: 19 March – 24 March; Host: Basel, Switzerland; Venue: St. Jakobshalle; Level: Super 300; Prize: $210,000; Format: 32MS/32WS/32MD/32WD/32XD	Score: 7–21, 22–20, 23–21	
18 March	Swiss Open (Draw): Dates: 19 March – 24 March; Host: Basel, Switzerland; Venue: St. Jakobshalle; Level: Super 300; Prize: $210,000; Format: 32MS/32WS/32MD/32WD/32XD	(Spain) Carolina Marín	(Indonesia) Gregoria Mariska Tunjung
18 March	Swiss Open (Draw): Dates: 19 March – 24 March; Host: Basel, Switzerland; Venue: St. Jakobshalle; Level: Super 300; Prize: $210,000; Format: 32MS/32WS/32MD/32WD/32XD	Score: 21–19, 13–21, 22–20	
18 March	Swiss Open (Draw): Dates: 19 March – 24 March; Host: Basel, Switzerland; Venue: St. Jakobshalle; Level: Super 300; Prize: $210,000; Format: 32MS/32WS/32MD/32WD/32XD	(England) Ben Lane (England) Sean Vendy	(Indonesia) Muhammad Shohibul Fikri (Indonesia) Bagas Maulana
18 March	Swiss Open (Draw): Dates: 19 March – 24 March; Host: Basel, Switzerland; Venue: St. Jakobshalle; Level: Super 300; Prize: $210,000; Format: 32MS/32WS/32MD/32WD/32XD	Score: 24–22, 28–26	
18 March	Swiss Open (Draw): Dates: 19 March – 24 March; Host: Basel, Switzerland; Venue: St. Jakobshalle; Level: Super 300; Prize: $210,000; Format: 32MS/32WS/32MD/32WD/32XD	(Indonesia) Lanny Tria Mayasari (Indonesia) Ribka Sugiarto	(Chinese Taipei) Hsu Ya-ching (Chinese Taipei) Lin Wan-ching
18 March	Swiss Open (Draw): Dates: 19 March – 24 March; Host: Basel, Switzerland; Venue: St. Jakobshalle; Level: Super 300; Prize: $210,000; Format: 32MS/32WS/32MD/32WD/32XD	Score: 13–21, 21–16, 21–8	
18 March	Swiss Open (Draw): Dates: 19 March – 24 March; Host: Basel, Switzerland; Venue: St. Jakobshalle; Level: Super 300; Prize: $210,000; Format: 32MS/32WS/32MD/32WD/32XD	(Malaysia) Goh Soon Huat (Malaysia) Shevon Jemie Lai	(Malaysia) Chen Tang Jie (Malaysia) Toh Ee Wei
18 March	Swiss Open (Draw): Dates: 19 March – 24 March; Host: Basel, Switzerland; Venue: St. Jakobshalle; Level: Super 300; Prize: $210,000; Format: 32MS/32WS/32MD/32WD/32XD	Score: 21–16, 21–13	
18 March	Ruichang China Masters (Draw): Dates: 19 March – 24 March; Host: Ruichang, China; Venue: Ruichang Sports Park Gym; Level: Super 100; Prize: $120,000; Format: 48MS/32WS/32MD/32WD/32XD	(China) Wang Zhengxing	(China) Liu Liang
18 March	Ruichang China Masters (Draw): Dates: 19 March – 24 March; Host: Ruichang, China; Venue: Ruichang Sports Park Gym; Level: Super 100; Prize: $120,000; Format: 48MS/32WS/32MD/32WD/32XD	Score: 21–19, 17–21, 21–17	
18 March	Ruichang China Masters (Draw): Dates: 19 March – 24 March; Host: Ruichang, China; Venue: Ruichang Sports Park Gym; Level: Super 100; Prize: $120,000; Format: 48MS/32WS/32MD/32WD/32XD	(Japan) Kaoru Sugiyama	(Chinese Taipei) Chiu Pin-chian
18 March	Ruichang China Masters (Draw): Dates: 19 March – 24 March; Host: Ruichang, China; Venue: Ruichang Sports Park Gym; Level: Super 100; Prize: $120,000; Format: 48MS/32WS/32MD/32WD/32XD	Score: 21–14, 14–21, 21–13	
18 March	Ruichang China Masters (Draw): Dates: 19 March – 24 March; Host: Ruichang, China; Venue: Ruichang Sports Park Gym; Level: Super 100; Prize: $120,000; Format: 48MS/32WS/32MD/32WD/32XD	(China) Tan Qiang (China) Zhou Haodong	(Chinese Taipei) Chiang Chien-wei (Chinese Taipei) Wu Hsuan-yi
18 March	Ruichang China Masters (Draw): Dates: 19 March – 24 March; Host: Ruichang, China; Venue: Ruichang Sports Park Gym; Level: Super 100; Prize: $120,000; Format: 48MS/32WS/32MD/32WD/32XD	Score: 21–18, 21–15	
18 March	Ruichang China Masters (Draw): Dates: 19 March – 24 March; Host: Ruichang, China; Venue: Ruichang Sports Park Gym; Level: Super 100; Prize: $120,000; Format: 48MS/32WS/32MD/32WD/32XD	(Thailand) Laksika Kanlaha (Thailand) Phataimas Muenwong	(China) Chen Xiaofei (China) Feng Xueying
18 March	Ruichang China Masters (Draw): Dates: 19 March – 24 March; Host: Ruichang, China; Venue: Ruichang Sports Park Gym; Level: Super 100; Prize: $120,000; Format: 48MS/32WS/32MD/32WD/32XD	Score: 17–21, 21–15, 21–16	
18 March	Ruichang China Masters (Draw): Dates: 19 March – 24 March; Host: Ruichang, China; Venue: Ruichang Sports Park Gym; Level: Super 100; Prize: $120,000; Format: 48MS/32WS/32MD/32WD/32XD	(China) Zhou Zhihong (China) Yang Jiayi	(China) Guo Xinwa (China) Li Qian
18 March	Ruichang China Masters (Draw): Dates: 19 March – 24 March; Host: Ruichang, China; Venue: Ruichang Sports Park Gym; Level: Super 100; Prize: $120,000; Format: 48MS/32WS/32MD/32WD/32XD	Score: 21–15, 21–15	
18 March	Polish Open: Dates: 20 March – 24 March; Host: Józefosław, Poland; Venue: LAVO Sport Centre; Level: International Challenge; Prize: $15,000; Format: 32MS/32WS/32MD/32WD/32XD	(Denmark) Victor Ørding Kauffmann	(Singapore) Jason Teh
18 March	Polish Open: Dates: 20 March – 24 March; Host: Józefosław, Poland; Venue: LAVO Sport Centre; Level: International Challenge; Prize: $15,000; Format: 32MS/32WS/32MD/32WD/32XD	Score: 21–16, 20–22, 25–23	
18 March	Polish Open: Dates: 20 March – 24 March; Host: Józefosław, Poland; Venue: LAVO Sport Centre; Level: International Challenge; Prize: $15,000; Format: 32MS/32WS/32MD/32WD/32XD	(India) Anupama Upadhyaya	(India) Tanya Hemanth
18 March	Polish Open: Dates: 20 March – 24 March; Host: Józefosław, Poland; Venue: LAVO Sport Centre; Level: International Challenge; Prize: $15,000; Format: 32MS/32WS/32MD/32WD/32XD	Score: 21–15, 11–21, 21–10	
18 March	Polish Open: Dates: 20 March – 24 March; Host: Józefosław, Poland; Venue: LAVO Sport Centre; Level: International Challenge; Prize: $15,000; Format: 32MS/32WS/32MD/32WD/32XD	(India) Arjun M. R. (India) Dhruv Kapila	(Denmark) William Kryger Boe (Denmark) Christian Faust Kjær
18 March	Polish Open: Dates: 20 March – 24 March; Host: Józefosław, Poland; Venue: LAVO Sport Centre; Level: International Challenge; Prize: $15,000; Format: 32MS/32WS/32MD/32WD/32XD	Score: 15–21, 23–21, 21–19	
18 March	Polish Open: Dates: 20 March – 24 March; Host: Józefosław, Poland; Venue: LAVO Sport Centre; Level: International Challenge; Prize: $15,000; Format: 32MS/32WS/32MD/32WD/32XD	(Chinese Taipei) Hsu Yin-hui (Chinese Taipei) Lin Jhih-yun	(Denmark) Amalie Cecilie Kudsk (Denmark) Signe Schulz
18 March	Polish Open: Dates: 20 March – 24 March; Host: Józefosław, Poland; Venue: LAVO Sport Centre; Level: International Challenge; Prize: $15,000; Format: 32MS/32WS/32MD/32WD/32XD	Score: 21–15, 21–16	
18 March	Polish Open: Dates: 20 March – 24 March; Host: Józefosław, Poland; Venue: LAVO Sport Centre; Level: International Challenge; Prize: $15,000; Format: 32MS/32WS/32MD/32WD/32XD	(Canada) Ty Alexander Lindeman (Canada) Josephine Wu	(England) Callum Hemming (England) Estelle van Leeuwen
18 March	Polish Open: Dates: 20 March – 24 March; Host: Józefosław, Poland; Venue: LAVO Sport Centre; Level: International Challenge; Prize: $15,000; Format: 32MS/32WS/32MD/32WD/32XD	Score: 21–16, 22–20	
25 March	Spain Masters (Draw): Dates: 26 March – 31 March; Host: Madrid, Spain; Venue: Centro Deportivo Municipal Gallur; Level: Super 300; Prize: $210,000; Format: 32MS/32WS/32MD/32WD/32XD	(Singapore) Loh Kean Yew	(France) Toma Junior Popov
25 March	Spain Masters (Draw): Dates: 26 March – 31 March; Host: Madrid, Spain; Venue: Centro Deportivo Municipal Gallur; Level: Super 300; Prize: $210,000; Format: 32MS/32WS/32MD/32WD/32XD	Score: 21–11, 15–21, 22–20	
25 March	Spain Masters (Draw): Dates: 26 March – 31 March; Host: Madrid, Spain; Venue: Centro Deportivo Municipal Gallur; Level: Super 300; Prize: $210,000; Format: 32MS/32WS/32MD/32WD/32XD	(Thailand) Ratchanok Intanon	(Thailand) Supanida Katethong
25 March	Spain Masters (Draw): Dates: 26 March – 31 March; Host: Madrid, Spain; Venue: Centro Deportivo Municipal Gallur; Level: Super 300; Prize: $210,000; Format: 32MS/32WS/32MD/32WD/32XD	Score: 21–12, 21–9	
25 March	Spain Masters (Draw): Dates: 26 March – 31 March; Host: Madrid, Spain; Venue: Centro Deportivo Municipal Gallur; Level: Super 300; Prize: $210,000; Format: 32MS/32WS/32MD/32WD/32XD	(Indonesia) Sabar Karyaman Gutama (Indonesia) Muhammad Reza Pahlevi Isfahani	(Malaysia) Junaidi Arif (Malaysia) Yap Roy King
25 March	Spain Masters (Draw): Dates: 26 March – 31 March; Host: Madrid, Spain; Venue: Centro Deportivo Municipal Gallur; Level: Super 300; Prize: $210,000; Format: 32MS/32WS/32MD/32WD/32XD	Score: 21–18, 17–21, 21–19	
25 March	Spain Masters (Draw): Dates: 26 March – 31 March; Host: Madrid, Spain; Venue: Centro Deportivo Municipal Gallur; Level: Super 300; Prize: $210,000; Format: 32MS/32WS/32MD/32WD/32XD	(Japan) Rin Iwanaga (Japan) Kie Nakanishi	(Indonesia) Febriana Dwipuji Kusuma (Indonesia) Amallia Cahaya Pratiwi
25 March	Spain Masters (Draw): Dates: 26 March – 31 March; Host: Madrid, Spain; Venue: Centro Deportivo Municipal Gallur; Level: Super 300; Prize: $210,000; Format: 32MS/32WS/32MD/32WD/32XD	Score: 12–21, 21–8, 21–16	
25 March	Spain Masters (Draw): Dates: 26 March – 31 March; Host: Madrid, Spain; Venue: Centro Deportivo Municipal Gallur; Level: Super 300; Prize: $210,000; Format: 32MS/32WS/32MD/32WD/32XD	(Indonesia) Rinov Rivaldy (Indonesia) Pitha Haningtyas Mentari	(China) Cheng Xing (China) Zhang Chi
25 March	Spain Masters (Draw): Dates: 26 March – 31 March; Host: Madrid, Spain; Venue: Centro Deportivo Municipal Gallur; Level: Super 300; Prize: $210,000; Format: 32MS/32WS/32MD/32WD/32XD	Score: 17–21, 21–12, 21–13	
25 March	Thailand International: Dates: 26 March – 31 March; Host: Nakhon Ratchasima, Thailand; Venue: Terminal Hall; Level: International Challenge; Prize: $25,000; Format: 64MS/32WS/32MD/32WD/32XD	(Thailand) Panitchaphon Teeraratsakul	(Indonesia) Ikhsan Rumbay
25 March	Thailand International: Dates: 26 March – 31 March; Host: Nakhon Ratchasima, Thailand; Venue: Terminal Hall; Level: International Challenge; Prize: $25,000; Format: 64MS/32WS/32MD/32WD/32XD	Score: 21–19, 21–12	
25 March	Thailand International: Dates: 26 March – 31 March; Host: Nakhon Ratchasima, Thailand; Venue: Terminal Hall; Level: International Challenge; Prize: $25,000; Format: 64MS/32WS/32MD/32WD/32XD	(Japan) Riko Gunji	(Indonesia) Mutiara Ayu Puspitasari
25 March	Thailand International: Dates: 26 March – 31 March; Host: Nakhon Ratchasima, Thailand; Venue: Terminal Hall; Level: International Challenge; Prize: $25,000; Format: 64MS/32WS/32MD/32WD/32XD	Score: 21–14, 21–15	
25 March	Thailand International: Dates: 26 March – 31 March; Host: Nakhon Ratchasima, Thailand; Venue: Terminal Hall; Level: International Challenge; Prize: $25,000; Format: 64MS/32WS/32MD/32WD/32XD	(Malaysia) Kang Khai Xing (Malaysia) Aaron Tai	(Thailand) Peeratchai Sukphun (Thailand) Pakkapon Teeraratsakul
25 March	Thailand International: Dates: 26 March – 31 March; Host: Nakhon Ratchasima, Thailand; Venue: Terminal Hall; Level: International Challenge; Prize: $25,000; Format: 64MS/32WS/32MD/32WD/32XD	Score: 21–17, 21–18	
25 March	Thailand International: Dates: 26 March – 31 March; Host: Nakhon Ratchasima, Thailand; Venue: Terminal Hall; Level: International Challenge; Prize: $25,000; Format: 64MS/32WS/32MD/32WD/32XD	(Thailand) Laksika Kanlaha (Thailand) Phataimas Muenwong	(Chinese Taipei) Lin Xiao-min (Chinese Taipei) Liu Chiao-yun
25 March	Thailand International: Dates: 26 March – 31 March; Host: Nakhon Ratchasima, Thailand; Venue: Terminal Hall; Level: International Challenge; Prize: $25,000; Format: 64MS/32WS/32MD/32WD/32XD	Score: 12–21, 21–12, 21–16	
25 March	Thailand International: Dates: 26 March – 31 March; Host: Nakhon Ratchasima, Thailand; Venue: Terminal Hall; Level: International Challenge; Prize: $25,000; Format: 64MS/32WS/32MD/32WD/32XD	(Thailand) Pakkapon Teeraratsakul (Thailand) Phataimas Muenwong	(Indonesia) Marwan Faza (Indonesia) Felisha Pasaribu
25 March	Thailand International: Dates: 26 March – 31 March; Host: Nakhon Ratchasima, Thailand; Venue: Terminal Hall; Level: International Challenge; Prize: $25,000; Format: 64MS/32WS/32MD/32WD/32XD	Score: 21–13, 21–9	

=== April ===
Week commencing	Tournament	Champions	Runners-up
1 April	Kazakhstan International: Dates: 2 April – 6 April; Host: Uralsk, Kazakhstan; Venue: Energiya Sports Center; Level: International Challenge; Prize: $15,000; Format: 32MS/32WS/32MD/16WD/32XD	(India) Tharun Mannepalli	(Malaysia) Soong Joo Ven
1 April	Kazakhstan International: Dates: 2 April – 6 April; Host: Uralsk, Kazakhstan; Venue: Energiya Sports Center; Level: International Challenge; Prize: $15,000; Format: 32MS/32WS/32MD/16WD/32XD	Score: 21–10, 21–19	
1 April	Kazakhstan International: Dates: 2 April – 6 April; Host: Uralsk, Kazakhstan; Venue: Energiya Sports Center; Level: International Challenge; Prize: $15,000; Format: 32MS/32WS/32MD/16WD/32XD	(India) Anupama Upadhyaya	(India) Isharani Baruah
1 April	Kazakhstan International: Dates: 2 April – 6 April; Host: Uralsk, Kazakhstan; Venue: Energiya Sports Center; Level: International Challenge; Prize: $15,000; Format: 32MS/32WS/32MD/16WD/32XD	Score: 21–15, 21–16	
1 April	Kazakhstan International: Dates: 2 April – 6 April; Host: Uralsk, Kazakhstan; Venue: Energiya Sports Center; Level: International Challenge; Prize: $15,000; Format: 32MS/32WS/32MD/16WD/32XD	(France) Lucas Corvée (France) Ronan Labar	(Japan) Kakeru Kumagai (Japan) Hiroki Nishi
1 April	Kazakhstan International: Dates: 2 April – 6 April; Host: Uralsk, Kazakhstan; Venue: Energiya Sports Center; Level: International Challenge; Prize: $15,000; Format: 32MS/32WS/32MD/16WD/32XD	Score: 21–14, 21–19	
1 April	Kazakhstan International: Dates: 2 April – 6 April; Host: Uralsk, Kazakhstan; Venue: Energiya Sports Center; Level: International Challenge; Prize: $15,000; Format: 32MS/32WS/32MD/16WD/32XD	(Japan) Kaho Osawa (Japan) Mai Tanabe	(Ukraine) Polina Buhrova (Ukraine) Yevheniia Kantemyr
1 April	Kazakhstan International: Dates: 2 April – 6 April; Host: Uralsk, Kazakhstan; Venue: Energiya Sports Center; Level: International Challenge; Prize: $15,000; Format: 32MS/32WS/32MD/16WD/32XD	Score: walkover	
1 April	Kazakhstan International: Dates: 2 April – 6 April; Host: Uralsk, Kazakhstan; Venue: Energiya Sports Center; Level: International Challenge; Prize: $15,000; Format: 32MS/32WS/32MD/16WD/32XD	(Malaysia) Wong Tien Ci (Malaysia) Lim Chiew Sien	(India) Sanjai Srivatsa Dhanraj (India) K. Maneesha
1 April	Kazakhstan International: Dates: 2 April – 6 April; Host: Uralsk, Kazakhstan; Venue: Energiya Sports Center; Level: International Challenge; Prize: $15,000; Format: 32MS/32WS/32MD/16WD/32XD	Score: 9–21, 21–7, 21–12	
1 April	Osaka International (cancelled): Dates: 3 April – 7 April; Host: Osaka, Japan; Venue: TBC; Level: International Challenge; Prize: $25,000; Format: TBC		
1 April	Osaka International (cancelled): Dates: 3 April – 7 April; Host: Osaka, Japan; Venue: TBC; Level: International Challenge; Prize: $25,000; Format: TBC	Score:	
1 April	Osaka International (cancelled): Dates: 3 April – 7 April; Host: Osaka, Japan; Venue: TBC; Level: International Challenge; Prize: $25,000; Format: TBC	Score:	
1 April	Osaka International (cancelled): Dates: 3 April – 7 April; Host: Osaka, Japan; Venue: TBC; Level: International Challenge; Prize: $25,000; Format: TBC	Score:	
1 April	Osaka International (cancelled): Dates: 3 April – 7 April; Host: Osaka, Japan; Venue: TBC; Level: International Challenge; Prize: $25,000; Format: TBC	Score:	
1 April	Osaka International (cancelled): Dates: 3 April – 7 April; Host: Osaka, Japan; Venue: TBC; Level: International Challenge; Prize: $25,000; Format: TBC	Score:	
1 April	Malta International: Dates: 4 April – 7 April; Host: Cospicua, Malta; Venue: Cottonera Sports Complex; Level: Future Series; Format: 32MS/32WS/32MD/32WD/32XD	(Austria) Collins Valentine Filimon	(Austria) Wolfgang Gnedt
1 April	Malta International: Dates: 4 April – 7 April; Host: Cospicua, Malta; Venue: Cottonera Sports Complex; Level: Future Series; Format: 32MS/32WS/32MD/32WD/32XD	Score: 19–21, 21–17, 21–11	
1 April	Malta International: Dates: 4 April – 7 April; Host: Cospicua, Malta; Venue: Cottonera Sports Complex; Level: Future Series; Format: 32MS/32WS/32MD/32WD/32XD	(Indonesia) Aurelia Salsabila	(Denmark) Frederikke Lund
1 April	Malta International: Dates: 4 April – 7 April; Host: Cospicua, Malta; Venue: Cottonera Sports Complex; Level: Future Series; Format: 32MS/32WS/32MD/32WD/32XD	Score: 23–21, 21–17	
1 April	Malta International: Dates: 4 April – 7 April; Host: Cospicua, Malta; Venue: Cottonera Sports Complex; Level: Future Series; Format: 32MS/32WS/32MD/32WD/32XD	(Norway) Torjus Flåtten (Norway) Vegard Rikheim	(Italy) Matteo Massetti (Italy) David Salutt
1 April	Malta International: Dates: 4 April – 7 April; Host: Cospicua, Malta; Venue: Cottonera Sports Complex; Level: Future Series; Format: 32MS/32WS/32MD/32WD/32XD	Score: 21–18, 21–8	
1 April	Malta International: Dates: 4 April – 7 April; Host: Cospicua, Malta; Venue: Cottonera Sports Complex; Level: Future Series; Format: 32MS/32WS/32MD/32WD/32XD	(Denmark) Anna-Sofie Nielsen (Denmark) Frederikke Nielsen	(Denmark) Sofie Moesgaard (Denmark) Anne Mouritsen
1 April	Malta International: Dates: 4 April – 7 April; Host: Cospicua, Malta; Venue: Cottonera Sports Complex; Level: Future Series; Format: 32MS/32WS/32MD/32WD/32XD	Score: 21–18, 21–14	
1 April	Malta International: Dates: 4 April – 7 April; Host: Cospicua, Malta; Venue: Cottonera Sports Complex; Level: Future Series; Format: 32MS/32WS/32MD/32WD/32XD	(Ukraine) Viacheslav Yakovlev (Ukraine) Polina Tkach	(Denmark) Oliver Skovbo (Denmark) Anna-Sofie Nielsen
1 April	Malta International: Dates: 4 April – 7 April; Host: Cospicua, Malta; Venue: Cottonera Sports Complex; Level: Future Series; Format: 32MS/32WS/32MD/32WD/32XD	Score: 21–16, 14–21, 21–18	
8 April	European Championships (Draw): Dates: 8 April – 14 April; Host: Saarbrücken, Germany; Venue: Saarlandhalle; Level: Continental Individual Championships; Format: 64MS/64WS/32MD/32WD/32XD	(Denmark) Anders Antonsen	(France) Toma Junior Popov
8 April	European Championships (Draw): Dates: 8 April – 14 April; Host: Saarbrücken, Germany; Venue: Saarlandhalle; Level: Continental Individual Championships; Format: 64MS/64WS/32MD/32WD/32XD	Score: 21–18, 21–13	
8 April	European Championships (Draw): Dates: 8 April – 14 April; Host: Saarbrücken, Germany; Venue: Saarlandhalle; Level: Continental Individual Championships; Format: 64MS/64WS/32MD/32WD/32XD	(Spain) Carolina Marín	(Scotland) Kirsty Gilmour
8 April	European Championships (Draw): Dates: 8 April – 14 April; Host: Saarbrücken, Germany; Venue: Saarlandhalle; Level: Continental Individual Championships; Format: 64MS/64WS/32MD/32WD/32XD	Score: 21–11, 21–18	
8 April	European Championships (Draw): Dates: 8 April – 14 April; Host: Saarbrücken, Germany; Venue: Saarlandhalle; Level: Continental Individual Championships; Format: 64MS/64WS/32MD/32WD/32XD	(Denmark) Kim Astrup (Denmark) Anders Skaarup Rasmussen	(Denmark) Andreas Søndergaard (Denmark) Jesper Toft
8 April	European Championships (Draw): Dates: 8 April – 14 April; Host: Saarbrücken, Germany; Venue: Saarlandhalle; Level: Continental Individual Championships; Format: 64MS/64WS/32MD/32WD/32XD	Score: 21–16, 21–15	
8 April	European Championships (Draw): Dates: 8 April – 14 April; Host: Saarbrücken, Germany; Venue: Saarlandhalle; Level: Continental Individual Championships; Format: 64MS/64WS/32MD/32WD/32XD	(France) Margot Lambert (France) Anne Tran	(Bulgaria) Gabriela Stoeva (Bulgaria) Stefani Stoeva
8 April	European Championships (Draw): Dates: 8 April – 14 April; Host: Saarbrücken, Germany; Venue: Saarlandhalle; Level: Continental Individual Championships; Format: 64MS/64WS/32MD/32WD/32XD	Score: 16–21, 21–17, 21–11	
8 April	European Championships (Draw): Dates: 8 April – 14 April; Host: Saarbrücken, Germany; Venue: Saarlandhalle; Level: Continental Individual Championships; Format: 64MS/64WS/32MD/32WD/32XD	(France) Thom Gicquel (France) Delphine Delrue	(Denmark) Mathias Christiansen (Denmark) Alexandra Bøje
8 April	European Championships (Draw): Dates: 8 April – 14 April; Host: Saarbrücken, Germany; Venue: Saarlandhalle; Level: Continental Individual Championships; Format: 64MS/64WS/32MD/32WD/32XD	Score: 21–16, 21–15	
8 April	Asia Championships (Draw): Dates: 9 April – 14 April; Host: Ningbo, China; Venue: Ningbo Olympic Sports Center Gymnasium; Level: Continental Individual Championships; Format: 32MS/32WS/32MD/32WD/32XD	(Indonesia) Jonatan Christie	(China) Li Shifeng
8 April	Asia Championships (Draw): Dates: 9 April – 14 April; Host: Ningbo, China; Venue: Ningbo Olympic Sports Center Gymnasium; Level: Continental Individual Championships; Format: 32MS/32WS/32MD/32WD/32XD	Score: 21–15, 21–16	
8 April	Asia Championships (Draw): Dates: 9 April – 14 April; Host: Ningbo, China; Venue: Ningbo Olympic Sports Center Gymnasium; Level: Continental Individual Championships; Format: 32MS/32WS/32MD/32WD/32XD	(China) Wang Zhiyi	(China) Chen Yufei
8 April	Asia Championships (Draw): Dates: 9 April – 14 April; Host: Ningbo, China; Venue: Ningbo Olympic Sports Center Gymnasium; Level: Continental Individual Championships; Format: 32MS/32WS/32MD/32WD/32XD	Score: 21–19, 21–7	
8 April	Asia Championships (Draw): Dates: 9 April – 14 April; Host: Ningbo, China; Venue: Ningbo Olympic Sports Center Gymnasium; Level: Continental Individual Championships; Format: 32MS/32WS/32MD/32WD/32XD	(China) Liang Weikeng (China) Wang Chang	(Malaysia) Goh Sze Fei (Malaysia) Nur Izzuddin
8 April	Asia Championships (Draw): Dates: 9 April – 14 April; Host: Ningbo, China; Venue: Ningbo Olympic Sports Center Gymnasium; Level: Continental Individual Championships; Format: 32MS/32WS/32MD/32WD/32XD	Score: 21–17, 15–21, 21–10	
8 April	Asia Championships (Draw): Dates: 9 April – 14 April; Host: Ningbo, China; Venue: Ningbo Olympic Sports Center Gymnasium; Level: Continental Individual Championships; Format: 32MS/32WS/32MD/32WD/32XD	(South Korea) Baek Ha-na (South Korea) Lee So-hee	(China) Zhang Shuxian (China) Zheng Yu
8 April	Asia Championships (Draw): Dates: 9 April – 14 April; Host: Ningbo, China; Venue: Ningbo Olympic Sports Center Gymnasium; Level: Continental Individual Championships; Format: 32MS/32WS/32MD/32WD/32XD	Score: 23–21, 21–12	
8 April	Asia Championships (Draw): Dates: 9 April – 14 April; Host: Ningbo, China; Venue: Ningbo Olympic Sports Center Gymnasium; Level: Continental Individual Championships; Format: 32MS/32WS/32MD/32WD/32XD	(China) Feng Yanzhe (China) Huang Dongping	(South Korea) Seo Seung-jae (South Korea) Chae Yoo-jung
8 April	Asia Championships (Draw): Dates: 9 April – 14 April; Host: Ningbo, China; Venue: Ningbo Olympic Sports Center Gymnasium; Level: Continental Individual Championships; Format: 32MS/32WS/32MD/32WD/32XD	Score: 13–21, 21–15, 21–14	
8 April	Pan American Championships (Draw): Dates: 10 April – 13 April; Host: Guatemala City, Guatemala; Venue: Gimnasio Teodoro Palacios Flores; Level: Continental Individual Championships; Format: 64MS/64WS/32MD/32WD/32XD	(Guatemala) Kevin Cordón	(El Salvador) Uriel Canjura
8 April	Pan American Championships (Draw): Dates: 10 April – 13 April; Host: Guatemala City, Guatemala; Venue: Gimnasio Teodoro Palacios Flores; Level: Continental Individual Championships; Format: 64MS/64WS/32MD/32WD/32XD	Score: 14–21, 21–17, 21–13	
8 April	Pan American Championships (Draw): Dates: 10 April – 13 April; Host: Guatemala City, Guatemala; Venue: Gimnasio Teodoro Palacios Flores; Level: Continental Individual Championships; Format: 64MS/64WS/32MD/32WD/32XD	(United States) Beiwen Zhang	(Canada) Michelle Li
8 April	Pan American Championships (Draw): Dates: 10 April – 13 April; Host: Guatemala City, Guatemala; Venue: Gimnasio Teodoro Palacios Flores; Level: Continental Individual Championships; Format: 64MS/64WS/32MD/32WD/32XD	Score: 21–18, 18–21, 21–17	
8 April	Pan American Championships (Draw): Dates: 10 April – 13 April; Host: Guatemala City, Guatemala; Venue: Gimnasio Teodoro Palacios Flores; Level: Continental Individual Championships; Format: 64MS/64WS/32MD/32WD/32XD	(United States) Chen Zhi-yi (United States) Presley Smith	(Canada) Adam Dong (Canada) Nyl Yakura
8 April	Pan American Championships (Draw): Dates: 10 April – 13 April; Host: Guatemala City, Guatemala; Venue: Gimnasio Teodoro Palacios Flores; Level: Continental Individual Championships; Format: 64MS/64WS/32MD/32WD/32XD	Score: 21–14, 21–11	
8 April	Pan American Championships (Draw): Dates: 10 April – 13 April; Host: Guatemala City, Guatemala; Venue: Gimnasio Teodoro Palacios Flores; Level: Continental Individual Championships; Format: 64MS/64WS/32MD/32WD/32XD	(United States) Francesca Corbett (United States) Allison Lee	(United States) Annie Xu (United States) Kerry Xu
8 April	Pan American Championships (Draw): Dates: 10 April – 13 April; Host: Guatemala City, Guatemala; Venue: Gimnasio Teodoro Palacios Flores; Level: Continental Individual Championships; Format: 64MS/64WS/32MD/32WD/32XD	Score: 21–14, 21–15	
8 April	Pan American Championships (Draw): Dates: 10 April – 13 April; Host: Guatemala City, Guatemala; Venue: Gimnasio Teodoro Palacios Flores; Level: Continental Individual Championships; Format: 64MS/64WS/32MD/32WD/32XD	(United States) Presley Smith (United States) Allison Lee	(United States) Vinson Chiu (United States) Jennie Gai
8 April	Pan American Championships (Draw): Dates: 10 April – 13 April; Host: Guatemala City, Guatemala; Venue: Gimnasio Teodoro Palacios Flores; Level: Continental Individual Championships; Format: 64MS/64WS/32MD/32WD/32XD	Score: 15–21, 21–15, 21–14	
15 April	Slovak Open: Dates: 17 April – 20 April; Host: Bratislava, Slovakia; Venue: Multisport hall; Level: Future Series; Format: 32MS/32WS/32MD/32WD/32XD	(England) Ethan Rose	(Denmark) Karan Rajan Rajarajan
15 April	Slovak Open: Dates: 17 April – 20 April; Host: Bratislava, Slovakia; Venue: Multisport hall; Level: Future Series; Format: 32MS/32WS/32MD/32WD/32XD	Score: 13–21, 21–18, 21–17	
15 April	Slovak Open: Dates: 17 April – 20 April; Host: Bratislava, Slovakia; Venue: Multisport hall; Level: Future Series; Format: 32MS/32WS/32MD/32WD/32XD	(India) Purva Barve	(Hungary) Ágnes Kőrösi
15 April	Slovak Open: Dates: 17 April – 20 April; Host: Bratislava, Slovakia; Venue: Multisport hall; Level: Future Series; Format: 32MS/32WS/32MD/32WD/32XD	Score: 22–20, 21–16	
15 April	Slovak Open: Dates: 17 April – 20 April; Host: Bratislava, Slovakia; Venue: Multisport hall; Level: Future Series; Format: 32MS/32WS/32MD/32WD/32XD	(Poland) Jakub Melaniuk (Poland) Wiktor Trecki	(Slovenia) Andraž Krapež (Switzerland) Yann Orteu
15 April	Slovak Open: Dates: 17 April – 20 April; Host: Bratislava, Slovakia; Venue: Multisport hall; Level: Future Series; Format: 32MS/32WS/32MD/32WD/32XD	Score: 21–17, 24–22	
15 April	Slovak Open: Dates: 17 April – 20 April; Host: Bratislava, Slovakia; Venue: Multisport hall; Level: Future Series; Format: 32MS/32WS/32MD/32WD/32XD	(Austria) Serena Au Yeong (Austria) Katharina Hochmeir	(Poland) Dominika Kwaśnik (Poland) Karolina Szubert
15 April	Slovak Open: Dates: 17 April – 20 April; Host: Bratislava, Slovakia; Venue: Multisport hall; Level: Future Series; Format: 32MS/32WS/32MD/32WD/32XD	Score: 21–13, 21–11	
15 April	Slovak Open: Dates: 17 April – 20 April; Host: Bratislava, Slovakia; Venue: Multisport hall; Level: Future Series; Format: 32MS/32WS/32MD/32WD/32XD	(Poland) Jakub Melaniuk (Poland) Julia Pławecka	(Ukraine) Viacheslav Yakovlev (Ukraine) Polina Tkach
15 April	Slovak Open: Dates: 17 April – 20 April; Host: Bratislava, Slovakia; Venue: Multisport hall; Level: Future Series; Format: 32MS/32WS/32MD/32WD/32XD	Score: 21–18, 21–18	
22 April	Finnish International: Dates: 25 April – 28 April; Host: Vantaa, Finland; Venue: Energia Areena; Level: Future Series; Prize: $4,500; Format: 32MS/32WS/32MD/16WD/32XD	(Japan) Yudai Okimoto	(France) Grégoire Deschamp
22 April	Finnish International: Dates: 25 April – 28 April; Host: Vantaa, Finland; Venue: Energia Areena; Level: Future Series; Prize: $4,500; Format: 32MS/32WS/32MD/16WD/32XD	Score: 17–21, 21–9, 21–17	
22 April	Finnish International: Dates: 25 April – 28 April; Host: Vantaa, Finland; Venue: Energia Areena; Level: Future Series; Prize: $4,500; Format: 32MS/32WS/32MD/16WD/32XD	(France) Anna Tatranova	(Finland) Nella Nyqvist
22 April	Finnish International: Dates: 25 April – 28 April; Host: Vantaa, Finland; Venue: Energia Areena; Level: Future Series; Prize: $4,500; Format: 32MS/32WS/32MD/16WD/32XD	Score: 16–21, 23–21, 21–11	
22 April	Finnish International: Dates: 25 April – 28 April; Host: Vantaa, Finland; Venue: Energia Areena; Level: Future Series; Prize: $4,500; Format: 32MS/32WS/32MD/16WD/32XD	(Estonia) Karl Kert (Estonia) Tauri Kilk	(Estonia) Kristjan Kaljurand (Estonia) Raul Käsner
22 April	Finnish International: Dates: 25 April – 28 April; Host: Vantaa, Finland; Venue: Energia Areena; Level: Future Series; Prize: $4,500; Format: 32MS/32WS/32MD/16WD/32XD	Score: 15–21, 22–20, 21–18	
22 April	Finnish International: Dates: 25 April – 28 April; Host: Vantaa, Finland; Venue: Energia Areena; Level: Future Series; Prize: $4,500; Format: 32MS/32WS/32MD/16WD/32XD	(Australia) Priska Kustiadi (Australia) Nozomi Shimizu	(Switzerland) Cloé Brand (Switzerland) Julie Franconville
22 April	Finnish International: Dates: 25 April – 28 April; Host: Vantaa, Finland; Venue: Energia Areena; Level: Future Series; Prize: $4,500; Format: 32MS/32WS/32MD/16WD/32XD	Score: 21–17, 21–10	
22 April	Finnish International: Dates: 25 April – 28 April; Host: Vantaa, Finland; Venue: Energia Areena; Level: Future Series; Prize: $4,500; Format: 32MS/32WS/32MD/16WD/32XD	(Malaysia) Tan Wei Liang (Malaysia) Wong Kha Yan	(Finland) Anton Kaisti (Finland) Oona Tapola
22 April	Finnish International: Dates: 25 April – 28 April; Host: Vantaa, Finland; Venue: Energia Areena; Level: Future Series; Prize: $4,500; Format: 32MS/32WS/32MD/16WD/32XD	Score: 21–19, 21–16	
22 April	Thomas Cup (Draw): Dates: 27 April – 5 May; Host: Chengdu, China; Venue: High-Tech Zone Sports Center; Level: Continental Team Championships; Format: 16MT	China	Indonesia
22 April	Thomas Cup (Draw): Dates: 27 April – 5 May; Host: Chengdu, China; Venue: High-Tech Zone Sports Center; Level: Continental Team Championships; Format: 16MT	Shi Yuqi	Anthony Sinisuka Ginting
22 April	Thomas Cup (Draw): Dates: 27 April – 5 May; Host: Chengdu, China; Venue: High-Tech Zone Sports Center; Level: Continental Team Championships; Format: 16MT	Liang Weikeng; Wang Chang	Fajar Alfian; Muhammad Rian Ardianto
22 April	Thomas Cup (Draw): Dates: 27 April – 5 May; Host: Chengdu, China; Venue: High-Tech Zone Sports Center; Level: Continental Team Championships; Format: 16MT	Li Shifeng	Jonatan Christie
22 April	Thomas Cup (Draw): Dates: 27 April – 5 May; Host: Chengdu, China; Venue: High-Tech Zone Sports Center; Level: Continental Team Championships; Format: 16MT	He Jiting; Ren Xiangyu	Muhammad Shohibul Fikri; Bagas Maulana
22 April	Thomas Cup (Draw): Dates: 27 April – 5 May; Host: Chengdu, China; Venue: High-Tech Zone Sports Center; Level: Continental Team Championships; Format: 16MT	Lu Guangzu	Chico Aura Dwi Wardoyo
22 April	Thomas Cup (Draw): Dates: 27 April – 5 May; Host: Chengdu, China; Venue: High-Tech Zone Sports Center; Level: Continental Team Championships; Format: 16MT	Score: 3–1	
22 April	Uber Cup (Draw): Dates: 27 April – 5 May; Host: Chengdu, China; Venue: High-Tech Zone Sports Center; Level: Continental Team Championships; Format: 16WT	China	Indonesia
22 April	Uber Cup (Draw): Dates: 27 April – 5 May; Host: Chengdu, China; Venue: High-Tech Zone Sports Center; Level: Continental Team Championships; Format: 16WT	Chen Yufei	Gregoria Mariska Tunjung
22 April	Uber Cup (Draw): Dates: 27 April – 5 May; Host: Chengdu, China; Venue: High-Tech Zone Sports Center; Level: Continental Team Championships; Format: 16WT	Chen Qingchen; Jia Yifan	Siti Fadia Silva Ramadhanti; Ribka Sugiarto
22 April	Uber Cup (Draw): Dates: 27 April – 5 May; Host: Chengdu, China; Venue: High-Tech Zone Sports Center; Level: Continental Team Championships; Format: 16WT	He Bingjiao	Ester Nurumi Tri Wardoyo
22 April	Uber Cup (Draw): Dates: 27 April – 5 May; Host: Chengdu, China; Venue: High-Tech Zone Sports Center; Level: Continental Team Championships; Format: 16WT	Liu Shengshu; Zhang Shuxian	Lanny Tria Mayasari; Rachel Allessya Rose
22 April	Uber Cup (Draw): Dates: 27 April – 5 May; Host: Chengdu, China; Venue: High-Tech Zone Sports Center; Level: Continental Team Championships; Format: 16WT	Han Yue	Komang Ayu Cahya Dewi
22 April	Uber Cup (Draw): Dates: 27 April – 5 May; Host: Chengdu, China; Venue: High-Tech Zone Sports Center; Level: Continental Team Championships; Format: 16WT	Score: 3–0	

=== May ===
Week commencing	Tournament	Champions	Runners-up
29 April	Mexican International: Dates: 1 May – 5 May; Host: Guadalajara, Mexico; Venue: CODE Alcalde Section II; Level: International Challenge; Prize: $15,000; Format: 32MS/32WS/32MD/8WD/32XD	(Japan) Ryoma Muramoto	(Japan) Shogo Ogawa
29 April	Mexican International: Dates: 1 May – 5 May; Host: Guadalajara, Mexico; Venue: CODE Alcalde Section II; Level: International Challenge; Prize: $15,000; Format: 32MS/32WS/32MD/8WD/32XD	Score: 16–21, 21–18, 21–16	
29 April	Mexican International: Dates: 1 May – 5 May; Host: Guadalajara, Mexico; Venue: CODE Alcalde Section II; Level: International Challenge; Prize: $15,000; Format: 32MS/32WS/32MD/8WD/32XD	(United States) Ishika Jaiswal	(Spain) Clara Azurmendi
29 April	Mexican International: Dates: 1 May – 5 May; Host: Guadalajara, Mexico; Venue: CODE Alcalde Section II; Level: International Challenge; Prize: $15,000; Format: 32MS/32WS/32MD/8WD/32XD	Score: 14–21, 21–19, 21–19	
29 April	Mexican International: Dates: 1 May – 5 May; Host: Guadalajara, Mexico; Venue: CODE Alcalde Section II; Level: International Challenge; Prize: $15,000; Format: 32MS/32WS/32MD/8WD/32XD	(Japan) Seiya Inoue (Japan) Haruki Kawabe	(Brazil) Izak Batalha (Brazil) Matheus Voigt
29 April	Mexican International: Dates: 1 May – 5 May; Host: Guadalajara, Mexico; Venue: CODE Alcalde Section II; Level: International Challenge; Prize: $15,000; Format: 32MS/32WS/32MD/8WD/32XD	Score: 20–22, 21–12, 21–15	
29 April	Mexican International: Dates: 1 May – 5 May; Host: Guadalajara, Mexico; Venue: CODE Alcalde Section II; Level: International Challenge; Prize: $15,000; Format: 32MS/32WS/32MD/8WD/32XD	(Ukraine) Polina Buhrova (Ukraine) Yevheniia Kantemyr	(Mexico) Romina Fregoso (Mexico) Miriam Rodríguez
29 April	Mexican International: Dates: 1 May – 5 May; Host: Guadalajara, Mexico; Venue: CODE Alcalde Section II; Level: International Challenge; Prize: $15,000; Format: 32MS/32WS/32MD/8WD/32XD	Score: 21–12, 21–16	
29 April	Mexican International: Dates: 1 May – 5 May; Host: Guadalajara, Mexico; Venue: CODE Alcalde Section II; Level: International Challenge; Prize: $15,000; Format: 32MS/32WS/32MD/8WD/32XD	(Mexico) Luis Montoya (Mexico) Miriam Rodríguez	(Canada) Timothy Lock (Canada) Chloe Hoang
29 April	Mexican International: Dates: 1 May – 5 May; Host: Guadalajara, Mexico; Venue: CODE Alcalde Section II; Level: International Challenge; Prize: $15,000; Format: 32MS/32WS/32MD/8WD/32XD	Score: 21–14, 21–19	
29 April	Luxembourg Open: Dates: 2 May – 5 May; Host: Luxembourg, Luxembourg; Venue: D'Coque Centre National Sportif & Culturel; Level: International Challenge; Prize: $15,000; Format: 32MS/32WS/32MD/32WD/32XD	(France) Alex Lanier	(Singapore) Jason Teh
29 April	Luxembourg Open: Dates: 2 May – 5 May; Host: Luxembourg, Luxembourg; Venue: D'Coque Centre National Sportif & Culturel; Level: International Challenge; Prize: $15,000; Format: 32MS/32WS/32MD/32WD/32XD	Score: 21–17, 21–15	
29 April	Luxembourg Open: Dates: 2 May – 5 May; Host: Luxembourg, Luxembourg; Venue: D'Coque Centre National Sportif & Culturel; Level: International Challenge; Prize: $15,000; Format: 32MS/32WS/32MD/32WD/32XD	(Japan) Hina Akechi	(Japan) Riko Gunji
29 April	Luxembourg Open: Dates: 2 May – 5 May; Host: Luxembourg, Luxembourg; Venue: D'Coque Centre National Sportif & Culturel; Level: International Challenge; Prize: $15,000; Format: 32MS/32WS/32MD/32WD/32XD	Score: 21–16, 21–14	
29 April	Luxembourg Open: Dates: 2 May – 5 May; Host: Luxembourg, Luxembourg; Venue: D'Coque Centre National Sportif & Culturel; Level: International Challenge; Prize: $15,000; Format: 32MS/32WS/32MD/32WD/32XD	(Denmark) William Kryger Boe (Denmark) Christian Faust Kjær	(Denmark) Rasmus Espersen (Denmark) Marcus Rindshøj
29 April	Luxembourg Open: Dates: 2 May – 5 May; Host: Luxembourg, Luxembourg; Venue: D'Coque Centre National Sportif & Culturel; Level: International Challenge; Prize: $15,000; Format: 32MS/32WS/32MD/32WD/32XD	Score: 21–9, 12–21, 21–18	
29 April	Luxembourg Open: Dates: 2 May – 5 May; Host: Luxembourg, Luxembourg; Venue: D'Coque Centre National Sportif & Culturel; Level: International Challenge; Prize: $15,000; Format: 32MS/32WS/32MD/32WD/32XD	(Japan) Miki Kanehiro (Japan) Rui Kiyama	(England) Chloe Birch (England) Estelle van Leeuwen
29 April	Luxembourg Open: Dates: 2 May – 5 May; Host: Luxembourg, Luxembourg; Venue: D'Coque Centre National Sportif & Culturel; Level: International Challenge; Prize: $15,000; Format: 32MS/32WS/32MD/32WD/32XD	Score: 21–14, 21–13	
29 April	Luxembourg Open: Dates: 2 May – 5 May; Host: Luxembourg, Luxembourg; Venue: D'Coque Centre National Sportif & Culturel; Level: International Challenge; Prize: $15,000; Format: 32MS/32WS/32MD/32WD/32XD	(France) Grégoire Deschamp (Denmark) Iben Bergstein	(Denmark) Kristoffer Kolding (Denmark) Mette Werge
29 April	Luxembourg Open: Dates: 2 May – 5 May; Host: Luxembourg, Luxembourg; Venue: D'Coque Centre National Sportif & Culturel; Level: International Challenge; Prize: $15,000; Format: 32MS/32WS/32MD/32WD/32XD	Score: 22–20, 21–18	
6 May	Denmark Challenge: Dates: 8 May – 11 May; Host: Farum, Denmark; Venue: Farum Arena; Level: International Challenge; Prize: $15,000; Format: 32MS/32WS/32MD/32WD/32XD	(Japan) Yushi Tanaka	(France) Alex Lanier
6 May	Denmark Challenge: Dates: 8 May – 11 May; Host: Farum, Denmark; Venue: Farum Arena; Level: International Challenge; Prize: $15,000; Format: 32MS/32WS/32MD/32WD/32XD	Score: 15–21, 21–12, 21–11	
6 May	Denmark Challenge: Dates: 8 May – 11 May; Host: Farum, Denmark; Venue: Farum Arena; Level: International Challenge; Prize: $15,000; Format: 32MS/32WS/32MD/32WD/32XD	(Japan) Riko Gunji	(Japan) Hina Akechi
6 May	Denmark Challenge: Dates: 8 May – 11 May; Host: Farum, Denmark; Venue: Farum Arena; Level: International Challenge; Prize: $15,000; Format: 32MS/32WS/32MD/32WD/32XD	Score: 20–22, 21–16, 21–11	
6 May	Denmark Challenge: Dates: 8 May – 11 May; Host: Farum, Denmark; Venue: Farum Arena; Level: International Challenge; Prize: $15,000; Format: 32MS/32WS/32MD/32WD/32XD	(Denmark) William Kryger Boe (Denmark) Christian Faust Kjær	(Malaysia) Lau Yi Sheng (Malaysia) Lee Yi Bo
6 May	Denmark Challenge: Dates: 8 May – 11 May; Host: Farum, Denmark; Venue: Farum Arena; Level: International Challenge; Prize: $15,000; Format: 32MS/32WS/32MD/32WD/32XD	Score: 21–15, 21–13	
6 May	Denmark Challenge: Dates: 8 May – 11 May; Host: Farum, Denmark; Venue: Farum Arena; Level: International Challenge; Prize: $15,000; Format: 32MS/32WS/32MD/32WD/32XD	(Thailand) Laksika Kanlaha (Thailand) Phataimas Muenwong	(Japan) Kokona Ishikawa (Japan) Mio Konegawa
6 May	Denmark Challenge: Dates: 8 May – 11 May; Host: Farum, Denmark; Venue: Farum Arena; Level: International Challenge; Prize: $15,000; Format: 32MS/32WS/32MD/32WD/32XD	Score: 21–16, 21–18	
6 May	Denmark Challenge: Dates: 8 May – 11 May; Host: Farum, Denmark; Venue: Farum Arena; Level: International Challenge; Prize: $15,000; Format: 32MS/32WS/32MD/32WD/32XD	(Denmark) Jesper Toft (Denmark) Clara Graversen	(Denmark) Marcus Rindshøj (Sweden) Malena Norrman
6 May	Denmark Challenge: Dates: 8 May – 11 May; Host: Farum, Denmark; Venue: Farum Arena; Level: International Challenge; Prize: $15,000; Format: 32MS/32WS/32MD/32WD/32XD	Score: 21–16, 21–11	
6 May	Peru Future Series (cancelled): Dates: 9 May – 12 May; Host: Lima, Peru; Venue: Villa Deportiva Nacional; Level: Future Series; Format: TBC		
6 May	Peru Future Series (cancelled): Dates: 9 May – 12 May; Host: Lima, Peru; Venue: Villa Deportiva Nacional; Level: Future Series; Format: TBC	Score:	
6 May	Peru Future Series (cancelled): Dates: 9 May – 12 May; Host: Lima, Peru; Venue: Villa Deportiva Nacional; Level: Future Series; Format: TBC	Score:	
6 May	Peru Future Series (cancelled): Dates: 9 May – 12 May; Host: Lima, Peru; Venue: Villa Deportiva Nacional; Level: Future Series; Format: TBC	Score:	
6 May	Peru Future Series (cancelled): Dates: 9 May – 12 May; Host: Lima, Peru; Venue: Villa Deportiva Nacional; Level: Future Series; Format: TBC	Score:	
6 May	Peru Future Series (cancelled): Dates: 9 May – 12 May; Host: Lima, Peru; Venue: Villa Deportiva Nacional; Level: Future Series; Format: TBC	Score:	
13 May	Thailand Open (Draw): Dates: 14 May – 19 May; Host: Bangkok, Thailand; Venue: Nimibutr Stadium; Level: Super 500; Prize: $420,000; Format: 32MS/32WS/32MD/32WD/32XD	(Malaysia) Lee Zii Jia	(Hong Kong) Ng Ka Long
13 May	Thailand Open (Draw): Dates: 14 May – 19 May; Host: Bangkok, Thailand; Venue: Nimibutr Stadium; Level: Super 500; Prize: $420,000; Format: 32MS/32WS/32MD/32WD/32XD	Score: 21–11, 21–10	
13 May	Thailand Open (Draw): Dates: 14 May – 19 May; Host: Bangkok, Thailand; Venue: Nimibutr Stadium; Level: Super 500; Prize: $420,000; Format: 32MS/32WS/32MD/32WD/32XD	(Thailand) Supanida Katethong	(China) Han Yue
13 May	Thailand Open (Draw): Dates: 14 May – 19 May; Host: Bangkok, Thailand; Venue: Nimibutr Stadium; Level: Super 500; Prize: $420,000; Format: 32MS/32WS/32MD/32WD/32XD	Score: 21–16, 25–23	
13 May	Thailand Open (Draw): Dates: 14 May – 19 May; Host: Bangkok, Thailand; Venue: Nimibutr Stadium; Level: Super 500; Prize: $420,000; Format: 32MS/32WS/32MD/32WD/32XD	(India) Satwiksairaj Rankireddy (India) Chirag Shetty	(China) Chen Boyang (China) Liu Yi
13 May	Thailand Open (Draw): Dates: 14 May – 19 May; Host: Bangkok, Thailand; Venue: Nimibutr Stadium; Level: Super 500; Prize: $420,000; Format: 32MS/32WS/32MD/32WD/32XD	Score: 21–15, 21–15	
13 May	Thailand Open (Draw): Dates: 14 May – 19 May; Host: Bangkok, Thailand; Venue: Nimibutr Stadium; Level: Super 500; Prize: $420,000; Format: 32MS/32WS/32MD/32WD/32XD	(Thailand) Jongkolphan Kititharakul (Thailand) Rawinda Prajongjai	(Indonesia) Febriana Dwipuji Kusuma (Indonesia) Amallia Cahaya Pratiwi
13 May	Thailand Open (Draw): Dates: 14 May – 19 May; Host: Bangkok, Thailand; Venue: Nimibutr Stadium; Level: Super 500; Prize: $420,000; Format: 32MS/32WS/32MD/32WD/32XD	Score: 21–14, 21–14	
13 May	Thailand Open (Draw): Dates: 14 May – 19 May; Host: Bangkok, Thailand; Venue: Nimibutr Stadium; Level: Super 500; Prize: $420,000; Format: 32MS/32WS/32MD/32WD/32XD	(China) Guo Xinwa (China) Chen Fanghui	(Thailand) Dechapol Puavaranukroh (Thailand) Sapsiree Taerattanachai
13 May	Thailand Open (Draw): Dates: 14 May – 19 May; Host: Bangkok, Thailand; Venue: Nimibutr Stadium; Level: Super 500; Prize: $420,000; Format: 32MS/32WS/32MD/32WD/32XD	Score: 12–21, 21–12, 21–18	
13 May	Slovenia Open: Dates: 15 May – 19 May; Host: Maribor, Slovenia; Venue: Hotel Draš; Level: International Series; Prize: $5,000; Format: 64MS/64WS/32MD/32WD/32XD	(Malaysia) Justin Hoh	(Indonesia) Prahdika Bagas Shujiwo
13 May	Slovenia Open: Dates: 15 May – 19 May; Host: Maribor, Slovenia; Venue: Hotel Draš; Level: International Series; Prize: $5,000; Format: 64MS/64WS/32MD/32WD/32XD	Score: 19–21, 21–11, 21–15	
13 May	Slovenia Open: Dates: 15 May – 19 May; Host: Maribor, Slovenia; Venue: Hotel Draš; Level: International Series; Prize: $5,000; Format: 64MS/64WS/32MD/32WD/32XD	(India) Rakshitha Ramraj	(India) Shriyanshi Valishetty
13 May	Slovenia Open: Dates: 15 May – 19 May; Host: Maribor, Slovenia; Venue: Hotel Draš; Level: International Series; Prize: $5,000; Format: 64MS/64WS/32MD/32WD/32XD	Score: 21–16, 21–17	
13 May	Slovenia Open: Dates: 15 May – 19 May; Host: Maribor, Slovenia; Venue: Hotel Draš; Level: International Series; Prize: $5,000; Format: 64MS/64WS/32MD/32WD/32XD	(Indonesia) Muhammad Al Farizi (Indonesia) Nikolaus Joaquin	(Indonesia) Rahmat Hidayat (Indonesia) Yeremia Rambitan
13 May	Slovenia Open: Dates: 15 May – 19 May; Host: Maribor, Slovenia; Venue: Hotel Draš; Level: International Series; Prize: $5,000; Format: 64MS/64WS/32MD/32WD/32XD	Score: 21–15, 22–20	
13 May	Slovenia Open: Dates: 15 May – 19 May; Host: Maribor, Slovenia; Venue: Hotel Draš; Level: International Series; Prize: $5,000; Format: 64MS/64WS/32MD/32WD/32XD	(Indonesia) Siti Sarah Azzahra (Indonesia) Agnia Sri Rahayu	(Chinese Taipei) Chen Yan-fei (Chinese Taipei) Sun Liang-ching
13 May	Slovenia Open: Dates: 15 May – 19 May; Host: Maribor, Slovenia; Venue: Hotel Draš; Level: International Series; Prize: $5,000; Format: 64MS/64WS/32MD/32WD/32XD	Score: 21–16, 21–11	
13 May	Slovenia Open: Dates: 15 May – 19 May; Host: Maribor, Slovenia; Venue: Hotel Draš; Level: International Series; Prize: $5,000; Format: 64MS/64WS/32MD/32WD/32XD	(Indonesia) Amri Syahnawi (Indonesia) Indah Cahya Sari Jamil	(Indonesia) Verrell Yustin Mulia (Indonesia) Priskila Venus Elsadai
13 May	Slovenia Open: Dates: 15 May – 19 May; Host: Maribor, Slovenia; Venue: Hotel Draš; Level: International Series; Prize: $5,000; Format: 64MS/64WS/32MD/32WD/32XD	Score: 15–21, 22–20, 21–19	
20 May	Malaysia Masters (Draw): Dates: 21 May – 26 May; Host: Kuala Lumpur, Malaysia; Venue: Axiata Arena; Level: Super 500; Prize: $420,000; Format: 32MS/32WS/32MD/32WD/32XD	(Denmark) Viktor Axelsen	(Malaysia) Lee Zii Jia
20 May	Malaysia Masters (Draw): Dates: 21 May – 26 May; Host: Kuala Lumpur, Malaysia; Venue: Axiata Arena; Level: Super 500; Prize: $420,000; Format: 32MS/32WS/32MD/32WD/32XD	Score: 21–6, 20–22, 21–13	
20 May	Malaysia Masters (Draw): Dates: 21 May – 26 May; Host: Kuala Lumpur, Malaysia; Venue: Axiata Arena; Level: Super 500; Prize: $420,000; Format: 32MS/32WS/32MD/32WD/32XD	(China) Wang Zhiyi	(India) P. V. Sindhu
20 May	Malaysia Masters (Draw): Dates: 21 May – 26 May; Host: Kuala Lumpur, Malaysia; Venue: Axiata Arena; Level: Super 500; Prize: $420,000; Format: 32MS/32WS/32MD/32WD/32XD	Score: 16–21, 21–5, 21–16	
20 May	Malaysia Masters (Draw): Dates: 21 May – 26 May; Host: Kuala Lumpur, Malaysia; Venue: Axiata Arena; Level: Super 500; Prize: $420,000; Format: 32MS/32WS/32MD/32WD/32XD	(Denmark) Kim Astrup (Denmark) Anders Skaarup Rasmussen	(South Korea) Jin Yong (South Korea) Na Sung-seung
20 May	Malaysia Masters (Draw): Dates: 21 May – 26 May; Host: Kuala Lumpur, Malaysia; Venue: Axiata Arena; Level: Super 500; Prize: $420,000; Format: 32MS/32WS/32MD/32WD/32XD	Score: 21–18, 21–14	
20 May	Malaysia Masters (Draw): Dates: 21 May – 26 May; Host: Kuala Lumpur, Malaysia; Venue: Axiata Arena; Level: Super 500; Prize: $420,000; Format: 32MS/32WS/32MD/32WD/32XD	(Japan) Rin Iwanaga (Japan) Kie Nakanishi	(South Korea) Lee Yu-lim (South Korea) Shin Seung-chan
20 May	Malaysia Masters (Draw): Dates: 21 May – 26 May; Host: Kuala Lumpur, Malaysia; Venue: Axiata Arena; Level: Super 500; Prize: $420,000; Format: 32MS/32WS/32MD/32WD/32XD	Score: 17–21, 21–19, 21–18	
20 May	Malaysia Masters (Draw): Dates: 21 May – 26 May; Host: Kuala Lumpur, Malaysia; Venue: Axiata Arena; Level: Super 500; Prize: $420,000; Format: 32MS/32WS/32MD/32WD/32XD	(Malaysia) Goh Soon Huat (Malaysia) Shevon Jemie Lai	(Indonesia) Rinov Rivaldy (Indonesia) Pitha Haningtyas Mentari
20 May	Malaysia Masters (Draw): Dates: 21 May – 26 May; Host: Kuala Lumpur, Malaysia; Venue: Axiata Arena; Level: Super 500; Prize: $420,000; Format: 32MS/32WS/32MD/32WD/32XD	Score: 21–18, 21–19	
20 May	Austrian Open: Dates: 23 May – 26 May; Host: Graz, Austria; Venue: Raiffeisen Sportpark; Level: International Series; Prize: $5,000; Format: 32MS/32WS/32MD/32WD/32XD	(Indonesia) Prahdiska Bagas Shujiwo	(Croatia) Aria Dinata
20 May	Austrian Open: Dates: 23 May – 26 May; Host: Graz, Austria; Venue: Raiffeisen Sportpark; Level: International Series; Prize: $5,000; Format: 32MS/32WS/32MD/32WD/32XD	Score: 21–6, 21–18	
20 May	Austrian Open: Dates: 23 May – 26 May; Host: Graz, Austria; Venue: Raiffeisen Sportpark; Level: International Series; Prize: $5,000; Format: 32MS/32WS/32MD/32WD/32XD	(Indonesia) Deswanti Hujansih Nurtertiati	(Indonesia) Chiara Marvella Handoyo
20 May	Austrian Open: Dates: 23 May – 26 May; Host: Graz, Austria; Venue: Raiffeisen Sportpark; Level: International Series; Prize: $5,000; Format: 32MS/32WS/32MD/32WD/32XD	Score: 21–23, 21–12, 5–1^{ret}	
20 May	Austrian Open: Dates: 23 May – 26 May; Host: Graz, Austria; Venue: Raiffeisen Sportpark; Level: International Series; Prize: $5,000; Format: 32MS/32WS/32MD/32WD/32XD	(Indonesia) Daniel Edgar Marvino (Indonesia) Christopher David Wijaya	(Indonesia) Putra Erwiansyah (Indonesia) Teges Satriaji Cahyo Hutomo
20 May	Austrian Open: Dates: 23 May – 26 May; Host: Graz, Austria; Venue: Raiffeisen Sportpark; Level: International Series; Prize: $5,000; Format: 32MS/32WS/32MD/32WD/32XD	Score: 21–16, 21–14	
20 May	Austrian Open: Dates: 23 May – 26 May; Host: Graz, Austria; Venue: Raiffeisen Sportpark; Level: International Series; Prize: $5,000; Format: 32MS/32WS/32MD/32WD/32XD	(Indonesia) Arlya Nabila Thesa Munggaran (Indonesia) Az Zahra Ditya Ramadhani	(Chinese Taipei) Chen Yan-fei (Chinese Taipei) Sun Liang-ching
20 May	Austrian Open: Dates: 23 May – 26 May; Host: Graz, Austria; Venue: Raiffeisen Sportpark; Level: International Series; Prize: $5,000; Format: 32MS/32WS/32MD/32WD/32XD	Score: 21–15, 21–15	
20 May	Austrian Open: Dates: 23 May – 26 May; Host: Graz, Austria; Venue: Raiffeisen Sportpark; Level: International Series; Prize: $5,000; Format: 32MS/32WS/32MD/32WD/32XD	(Indonesia) Marwan Faza (Indonesia) Felisha Pasaribu	(Indonesia) Amri Syahnawi (Indonesia) Indah Cahya Sari Jamil
20 May	Austrian Open: Dates: 23 May – 26 May; Host: Graz, Austria; Venue: Raiffeisen Sportpark; Level: International Series; Prize: $5,000; Format: 32MS/32WS/32MD/32WD/32XD	Score: 21–15, 21–15	
27 May	Singapore Open (Draw): Dates: 28 May – 2 June; Host: Kallang, Singapore; Venue: Singapore Indoor Stadium; Level: Super 750; Prize: $850,000; Format: 32MS/32WS/32MD/32WD/32XD	(China) Shi Yuqi	(China) Li Shifeng
27 May	Singapore Open (Draw): Dates: 28 May – 2 June; Host: Kallang, Singapore; Venue: Singapore Indoor Stadium; Level: Super 750; Prize: $850,000; Format: 32MS/32WS/32MD/32WD/32XD	Score: 17–21, 21–19, 21–19	
27 May	Singapore Open (Draw): Dates: 28 May – 2 June; Host: Kallang, Singapore; Venue: Singapore Indoor Stadium; Level: Super 750; Prize: $850,000; Format: 32MS/32WS/32MD/32WD/32XD	(South Korea) An Se-young	(China) Chen Yufei
27 May	Singapore Open (Draw): Dates: 28 May – 2 June; Host: Kallang, Singapore; Venue: Singapore Indoor Stadium; Level: Super 750; Prize: $850,000; Format: 32MS/32WS/32MD/32WD/32XD	Score: 21–19, 16–21, 21–12	
27 May	Singapore Open (Draw): Dates: 28 May – 2 June; Host: Kallang, Singapore; Venue: Singapore Indoor Stadium; Level: Super 750; Prize: $850,000; Format: 32MS/32WS/32MD/32WD/32XD	(China) He Jiting (China) Ren Xiangyu	(Indonesia) Fajar Alfian (Indonesia) Muhammad Rian Ardianto
27 May	Singapore Open (Draw): Dates: 28 May – 2 June; Host: Kallang, Singapore; Venue: Singapore Indoor Stadium; Level: Super 750; Prize: $850,000; Format: 32MS/32WS/32MD/32WD/32XD	Score: 21–19, 21–14	
27 May	Singapore Open (Draw): Dates: 28 May – 2 June; Host: Kallang, Singapore; Venue: Singapore Indoor Stadium; Level: Super 750; Prize: $850,000; Format: 32MS/32WS/32MD/32WD/32XD	(China) Chen Qingchen (China) Jia Yifan	(Japan) Nami Matsuyama (Japan) Chiharu Shida
27 May	Singapore Open (Draw): Dates: 28 May – 2 June; Host: Kallang, Singapore; Venue: Singapore Indoor Stadium; Level: Super 750; Prize: $850,000; Format: 32MS/32WS/32MD/32WD/32XD	Score: 21–15, 21–12	
27 May	Singapore Open (Draw): Dates: 28 May – 2 June; Host: Kallang, Singapore; Venue: Singapore Indoor Stadium; Level: Super 750; Prize: $850,000; Format: 32MS/32WS/32MD/32WD/32XD	(China) Zheng Siwei (China) Huang Yaqiong	(Chinese Taipei) Yang Po-hsuan (Chinese Taipei) Hu Ling-fang
27 May	Singapore Open (Draw): Dates: 28 May – 2 June; Host: Kallang, Singapore; Venue: Singapore Indoor Stadium; Level: Super 750; Prize: $850,000; Format: 32MS/32WS/32MD/32WD/32XD	Score: 21–11, 21–19	
27 May	Bonn International: Dates: 29 May – 1 June; Host: Bonn, Germany; Venue: Erwin Kranz Halle; Level: Future Series; Format: 32MS/32WS/32MD/32WD/32XD	(Chinese Taipei) Cheng Kai	(Sweden) Gustav Bjorkler
27 May	Bonn International: Dates: 29 May – 1 June; Host: Bonn, Germany; Venue: Erwin Kranz Halle; Level: Future Series; Format: 32MS/32WS/32MD/32WD/32XD	Score: 21–11, 21–16	
27 May	Bonn International: Dates: 29 May – 1 June; Host: Bonn, Germany; Venue: Erwin Kranz Halle; Level: Future Series; Format: 32MS/32WS/32MD/32WD/32XD	(India) Tanvi Sharma	(Chinese Taipei) Wang Pei-yu
27 May	Bonn International: Dates: 29 May – 1 June; Host: Bonn, Germany; Venue: Erwin Kranz Halle; Level: Future Series; Format: 32MS/32WS/32MD/32WD/32XD	Score: 21–19, 22–20	
27 May	Bonn International: Dates: 29 May – 1 June; Host: Bonn, Germany; Venue: Erwin Kranz Halle; Level: Future Series; Format: 32MS/32WS/32MD/32WD/32XD	(Chinese Taipei) Cheng Kai (Chinese Taipei) Su Wei-cheng	(Netherlands) Noah Haase (Netherlands) Dyon van Wijlick
27 May	Bonn International: Dates: 29 May – 1 June; Host: Bonn, Germany; Venue: Erwin Kranz Halle; Level: Future Series; Format: 32MS/32WS/32MD/32WD/32XD	Score: 21–16, 18–21, 21–9	
27 May	Bonn International: Dates: 29 May – 1 June; Host: Bonn, Germany; Venue: Erwin Kranz Halle; Level: Future Series; Format: 32MS/32WS/32MD/32WD/32XD	(Turkey) Yasemen Bektaş (Turkey) Zehra Erdem	(Chinese Taipei) Hsieh Yi-en (Chinese Taipei) Ko Ruo-hsuan
27 May	Bonn International: Dates: 29 May – 1 June; Host: Bonn, Germany; Venue: Erwin Kranz Halle; Level: Future Series; Format: 32MS/32WS/32MD/32WD/32XD	Score: 21–14, 21–6	
27 May	Bonn International: Dates: 29 May – 1 June; Host: Bonn, Germany; Venue: Erwin Kranz Halle; Level: Future Series; Format: 32MS/32WS/32MD/32WD/32XD	(Indonesia) Alden Mainaky (Indonesia) Fitriani	(Turkey) Emre Sonmez (Turkey) Yasemen Bektaş
27 May	Bonn International: Dates: 29 May – 1 June; Host: Bonn, Germany; Venue: Erwin Kranz Halle; Level: Future Series; Format: 32MS/32WS/32MD/32WD/32XD	Score: 21–13, 21–17	

=== June ===
Week commencing	Tournament	Champions	Runners-up
3 June	Indonesia Open (Draw): Dates: 4 June – 9 June; Host: Jakarta, Indonesia; Venue: Istora Gelora Bung Karno; Level: Super 1000; Prize: $1,300,000; Format: 32MS/32WS/32MD/32WD/32XD	(China) Shi Yuqi	(Denmark) Anders Antonsen
3 June	Indonesia Open (Draw): Dates: 4 June – 9 June; Host: Jakarta, Indonesia; Venue: Istora Gelora Bung Karno; Level: Super 1000; Prize: $1,300,000; Format: 32MS/32WS/32MD/32WD/32XD	Score: 21–9, 12–21, 21–14	
3 June	Indonesia Open (Draw): Dates: 4 June – 9 June; Host: Jakarta, Indonesia; Venue: Istora Gelora Bung Karno; Level: Super 1000; Prize: $1,300,000; Format: 32MS/32WS/32MD/32WD/32XD	(China) Chen Yufei	(South Korea) An Se-young
3 June	Indonesia Open (Draw): Dates: 4 June – 9 June; Host: Jakarta, Indonesia; Venue: Istora Gelora Bung Karno; Level: Super 1000; Prize: $1,300,000; Format: 32MS/32WS/32MD/32WD/32XD	Score: 21–14, 14–21, 21–18	
3 June	Indonesia Open (Draw): Dates: 4 June – 9 June; Host: Jakarta, Indonesia; Venue: Istora Gelora Bung Karno; Level: Super 1000; Prize: $1,300,000; Format: 32MS/32WS/32MD/32WD/32XD	(China) Liang Weikeng (China) Wang Chang	(Malaysia) Man Wei Chong (Malaysia) Tee Kai Wun
3 June	Indonesia Open (Draw): Dates: 4 June – 9 June; Host: Jakarta, Indonesia; Venue: Istora Gelora Bung Karno; Level: Super 1000; Prize: $1,300,000; Format: 32MS/32WS/32MD/32WD/32XD	Score: 19–21, 21–16, 21–12	
3 June	Indonesia Open (Draw): Dates: 4 June – 9 June; Host: Jakarta, Indonesia; Venue: Istora Gelora Bung Karno; Level: Super 1000; Prize: $1,300,000; Format: 32MS/32WS/32MD/32WD/32XD	(South Korea) Baek Ha-na (South Korea) Lee So-hee	(China) Chen Qingchen (China) Jia Yifan
3 June	Indonesia Open (Draw): Dates: 4 June – 9 June; Host: Jakarta, Indonesia; Venue: Istora Gelora Bung Karno; Level: Super 1000; Prize: $1,300,000; Format: 32MS/32WS/32MD/32WD/32XD	Score: 21–17, 21–13	
3 June	Indonesia Open (Draw): Dates: 4 June – 9 June; Host: Jakarta, Indonesia; Venue: Istora Gelora Bung Karno; Level: Super 1000; Prize: $1,300,000; Format: 32MS/32WS/32MD/32WD/32XD	(China) Jiang Zhenbang (China) Wei Yaxin	(China) Zheng Siwei (China) Huang Yaqiong
3 June	Indonesia Open (Draw): Dates: 4 June – 9 June; Host: Jakarta, Indonesia; Venue: Istora Gelora Bung Karno; Level: Super 1000; Prize: $1,300,000; Format: 32MS/32WS/32MD/32WD/32XD	Score: 21–11, 21–14	
3 June	Santo Domingo Open (cancelled): Dates: 5 June – 9 June; Host: Bavaro, Dominican Republic; Venue: Polideportivo Padre Fernando Lora; Level: International Series; Prize: $5,000; Format: TBC		
3 June	Santo Domingo Open (cancelled): Dates: 5 June – 9 June; Host: Bavaro, Dominican Republic; Venue: Polideportivo Padre Fernando Lora; Level: International Series; Prize: $5,000; Format: TBC	Score:	
3 June	Santo Domingo Open (cancelled): Dates: 5 June – 9 June; Host: Bavaro, Dominican Republic; Venue: Polideportivo Padre Fernando Lora; Level: International Series; Prize: $5,000; Format: TBC	Score:	
3 June	Santo Domingo Open (cancelled): Dates: 5 June – 9 June; Host: Bavaro, Dominican Republic; Venue: Polideportivo Padre Fernando Lora; Level: International Series; Prize: $5,000; Format: TBC	Score:	
3 June	Santo Domingo Open (cancelled): Dates: 5 June – 9 June; Host: Bavaro, Dominican Republic; Venue: Polideportivo Padre Fernando Lora; Level: International Series; Prize: $5,000; Format: TBC	Score:	
3 June	Santo Domingo Open (cancelled): Dates: 5 June – 9 June; Host: Bavaro, Dominican Republic; Venue: Polideportivo Padre Fernando Lora; Level: International Series; Prize: $5,000; Format: TBC	Score:	
3 June	Lithuanian International: Dates: 6 June – 9 June; Host: Panevėžys, Lithuania; Venue: Athletics Arena; Level: Future Series; Format: 32MS/32WS/32MD/32WD/32XD	(Denmark) William Bøgebjerg	(Malaysia) Tan Jia Jie
3 June	Lithuanian International: Dates: 6 June – 9 June; Host: Panevėžys, Lithuania; Venue: Athletics Arena; Level: Future Series; Format: 32MS/32WS/32MD/32WD/32XD	Score: 21–13, 21–18	
3 June	Lithuanian International: Dates: 6 June – 9 June; Host: Panevėžys, Lithuania; Venue: Athletics Arena; Level: Future Series; Format: 32MS/32WS/32MD/32WD/32XD	(Malaysia) Siti Nurshuhaini	(India) Purva Barve
3 June	Lithuanian International: Dates: 6 June – 9 June; Host: Panevėžys, Lithuania; Venue: Athletics Arena; Level: Future Series; Format: 32MS/32WS/32MD/32WD/32XD	Score: 22–20, 23–21	
3 June	Lithuanian International: Dates: 6 June – 9 June; Host: Panevėžys, Lithuania; Venue: Athletics Arena; Level: Future Series; Format: 32MS/32WS/32MD/32WD/32XD	(France) Nicolas Hoareau (France) Aymeric Tores	(Estonia) Kristjan Kaljurand (Estonia) Raul Käsner
3 June	Lithuanian International: Dates: 6 June – 9 June; Host: Panevėžys, Lithuania; Venue: Athletics Arena; Level: Future Series; Format: 32MS/32WS/32MD/32WD/32XD	Score: 21–15, 21–14	
3 June	Lithuanian International: Dates: 6 June – 9 June; Host: Panevėžys, Lithuania; Venue: Athletics Arena; Level: Future Series; Format: 32MS/32WS/32MD/32WD/32XD	(France) Marie Cesari (France) Lilou Schaffner	(Latvia) Anna Kupca (Latvia) Jekaterina Romanova
3 June	Lithuanian International: Dates: 6 June – 9 June; Host: Panevėžys, Lithuania; Venue: Athletics Arena; Level: Future Series; Format: 32MS/32WS/32MD/32WD/32XD	Score: 21–15, 21–15	
3 June	Lithuanian International: Dates: 6 June – 9 June; Host: Panevėžys, Lithuania; Venue: Athletics Arena; Level: Future Series; Format: 32MS/32WS/32MD/32WD/32XD	(Indonesia) Alden Mainaky (Indonesia) Fitriani	(Sweden) Martin Norrman (Sweden) Malena Norrman
3 June	Lithuanian International: Dates: 6 June – 9 June; Host: Panevėžys, Lithuania; Venue: Athletics Arena; Level: Future Series; Format: 32MS/32WS/32MD/32WD/32XD	Score: 21–18, 21–13	
10 June	Australian Open (Draw): Dates: 11 June – 16 June; Host: Sydney, Australia; Venue: State Sports Centre; Level: Super 500; Prize: $420,000; Format: 32MS/32WS/32MD/32WD/32XD	(Malaysia) Lee Zii Jia	(Japan) Kodai Naraoka
10 June	Australian Open (Draw): Dates: 11 June – 16 June; Host: Sydney, Australia; Venue: State Sports Centre; Level: Super 500; Prize: $420,000; Format: 32MS/32WS/32MD/32WD/32XD	Score: 21–19, 11–21, 21–18	
10 June	Australian Open (Draw): Dates: 11 June – 16 June; Host: Sydney, Australia; Venue: State Sports Centre; Level: Super 500; Prize: $420,000; Format: 32MS/32WS/32MD/32WD/32XD	(Japan) Aya Ohori	(Indonesia) Ester Nurumi Tri Wardoyo
10 June	Australian Open (Draw): Dates: 11 June – 16 June; Host: Sydney, Australia; Venue: State Sports Centre; Level: Super 500; Prize: $420,000; Format: 32MS/32WS/32MD/32WD/32XD	Score: 17–21, 21–19, 21–16	
10 June	Australian Open (Draw): Dates: 11 June – 16 June; Host: Sydney, Australia; Venue: State Sports Centre; Level: Super 500; Prize: $420,000; Format: 32MS/32WS/32MD/32WD/32XD	(China) He Jiting (China) Ren Xiangyu	(Indonesia) Mohammad Ahsan (Indonesia) Hendra Setiawan
10 June	Australian Open (Draw): Dates: 11 June – 16 June; Host: Sydney, Australia; Venue: State Sports Centre; Level: Super 500; Prize: $420,000; Format: 32MS/32WS/32MD/32WD/32XD	Score: 21–11, 21–10	
10 June	Australian Open (Draw): Dates: 11 June – 16 June; Host: Sydney, Australia; Venue: State Sports Centre; Level: Super 500; Prize: $420,000; Format: 32MS/32WS/32MD/32WD/32XD	(Indonesia) Febriana Dwipuji Kusuma (Indonesia) Amalia Cahaya Pratiwi	(Malaysia) Lai Pei Jing (Malaysia) Lim Chiew Sien
10 June	Australian Open (Draw): Dates: 11 June – 16 June; Host: Sydney, Australia; Venue: State Sports Centre; Level: Super 500; Prize: $420,000; Format: 32MS/32WS/32MD/32WD/32XD	Score: 12–21, 21–7, 21–13	
10 June	Australian Open (Draw): Dates: 11 June – 16 June; Host: Sydney, Australia; Venue: State Sports Centre; Level: Super 500; Prize: $420,000; Format: 32MS/32WS/32MD/32WD/32XD	(China) Jiang Zhenbang (China) Wei Yaxin	(China) Guo Xinwa (China) Chen Fanghui
10 June	Australian Open (Draw): Dates: 11 June – 16 June; Host: Sydney, Australia; Venue: State Sports Centre; Level: Super 500; Prize: $420,000; Format: 32MS/32WS/32MD/32WD/32XD	Score: 21–12, 16–21, 21–12	
10 June	Nantes International: Dates: 13 June – 16 June; Host: Nantes, France; Venue: Salle de la Trocardière; Level: International Challenge; Prize: $15,000; Format: 32MS/32WS/32MD/16WD/32XD	(France) Alex Lanier	(Spain) Pablo Abián
10 June	Nantes International: Dates: 13 June – 16 June; Host: Nantes, France; Venue: Salle de la Trocardière; Level: International Challenge; Prize: $15,000; Format: 32MS/32WS/32MD/16WD/32XD	Score: 21–14, 21–13	
10 June	Nantes International: Dates: 13 June – 16 June; Host: Nantes, France; Venue: Salle de la Trocardière; Level: International Challenge; Prize: $15,000; Format: 32MS/32WS/32MD/16WD/32XD	(Denmark) Line Christophersen	(Denmark) Amalie Schulz
10 June	Nantes International: Dates: 13 June – 16 June; Host: Nantes, France; Venue: Salle de la Trocardière; Level: International Challenge; Prize: $15,000; Format: 32MS/32WS/32MD/16WD/32XD	Score: 21–17, 21–11	
10 June	Nantes International: Dates: 13 June – 16 June; Host: Nantes, France; Venue: Salle de la Trocardière; Level: International Challenge; Prize: $15,000; Format: 32MS/32WS/32MD/16WD/32XD	(Denmark) Andreas Søndergaard (Denmark) Jesper Toft	(England) Rory Easton (England) Alex Green
10 June	Nantes International: Dates: 13 June – 16 June; Host: Nantes, France; Venue: Salle de la Trocardière; Level: International Challenge; Prize: $15,000; Format: 32MS/32WS/32MD/16WD/32XD	Score: 21–18, 15–21, 21–19	
10 June	Nantes International: Dates: 13 June – 16 June; Host: Nantes, France; Venue: Salle de la Trocardière; Level: International Challenge; Prize: $15,000; Format: 32MS/32WS/32MD/16WD/32XD	(England) Chloe Birch (England) Estelle van Leeuwen	(England) Abbygael Harris (England) Annie Lado
10 June	Nantes International: Dates: 13 June – 16 June; Host: Nantes, France; Venue: Salle de la Trocardière; Level: International Challenge; Prize: $15,000; Format: 32MS/32WS/32MD/16WD/32XD	Score: 21–18, 21–9	
10 June	Nantes International: Dates: 13 June – 16 June; Host: Nantes, France; Venue: Salle de la Trocardière; Level: International Challenge; Prize: $15,000; Format: 32MS/32WS/32MD/16WD/32XD	(Denmark) Jesper Toft (Denmark) Amalie Magelund	(England) Callum Hemming (England) Estelle van Leeuwen
10 June	Nantes International: Dates: 13 June – 16 June; Host: Nantes, France; Venue: Salle de la Trocardière; Level: International Challenge; Prize: $15,000; Format: 32MS/32WS/32MD/16WD/32XD	Score: 21–11, 21–13	
10 June	Venezuela Open: Dates: 13 June – 16 June; Host: Valencia, Venezuela; Venue: Complejo Deportivo Bicentenariojohnson; Level: Future Series; Format: 32MS/16WS/8MD/8WD/16XD	(Peru) Adriano Viale	(El Salvador) Javier Alas
10 June	Venezuela Open: Dates: 13 June – 16 June; Host: Valencia, Venezuela; Venue: Complejo Deportivo Bicentenariojohnson; Level: Future Series; Format: 32MS/16WS/8MD/8WD/16XD	Score: 21–11, 21–8	
10 June	Venezuela Open: Dates: 13 June – 16 June; Host: Valencia, Venezuela; Venue: Complejo Deportivo Bicentenariojohnson; Level: Future Series; Format: 32MS/16WS/8MD/8WD/16XD	(Brazil) Maria Clara Lima	(Brazil) Maria Júlia Nascimento
10 June	Venezuela Open: Dates: 13 June – 16 June; Host: Valencia, Venezuela; Venue: Complejo Deportivo Bicentenariojohnson; Level: Future Series; Format: 32MS/16WS/8MD/8WD/16XD	Score: 9–21, 21–15, 21–17	
10 June	Venezuela Open: Dates: 13 June – 16 June; Host: Valencia, Venezuela; Venue: Complejo Deportivo Bicentenariojohnson; Level: Future Series; Format: 32MS/16WS/8MD/8WD/16XD	(El Salvador) Javier Alas (Venezuela) Joiser Calanche	(Venezuela) Martinez Luis (Venezuela) Fabricio Rodriguez
10 June	Venezuela Open: Dates: 13 June – 16 June; Host: Valencia, Venezuela; Venue: Complejo Deportivo Bicentenariojohnson; Level: Future Series; Format: 32MS/16WS/8MD/8WD/16XD	Score: 21–15, 21–14	
10 June	Venezuela Open: Dates: 13 June – 16 June; Host: Valencia, Venezuela; Venue: Complejo Deportivo Bicentenariojohnson; Level: Future Series; Format: 32MS/16WS/8MD/8WD/16XD	(Brazil) Maria Clara Lima (Brazil) Maria Júlia Nascimento	(Venezuela) Karen Kampos (Venezuela) Lusbeth Sanchez
10 June	Venezuela Open: Dates: 13 June – 16 June; Host: Valencia, Venezuela; Venue: Complejo Deportivo Bicentenariojohnson; Level: Future Series; Format: 32MS/16WS/8MD/8WD/16XD	Score: 21–3, 21–6	
10 June	Venezuela Open: Dates: 13 June – 16 June; Host: Valencia, Venezuela; Venue: Complejo Deportivo Bicentenariojohnson; Level: Future Series; Format: 32MS/16WS/8MD/8WD/16XD	(Trinidad and Tobago) Reece Marcano (Trinidad and Tobago) Chequeda De Boulet	(Venezuela) Frank Barrios (Venezuela) María Rojas
10 June	Venezuela Open: Dates: 13 June – 16 June; Host: Valencia, Venezuela; Venue: Complejo Deportivo Bicentenariojohnson; Level: Future Series; Format: 32MS/16WS/8MD/8WD/16XD	Score: 21–15, 21–17	
17 June	New Zealand Open (cancelled): Dates: 18 June – 23 June; Host: Auckland, New Zealand; Venue: TBC; Level: Super 300; Prize: $210,000; Format: TBC		
17 June	New Zealand Open (cancelled): Dates: 18 June – 23 June; Host: Auckland, New Zealand; Venue: TBC; Level: Super 300; Prize: $210,000; Format: TBC	Score:	
17 June	New Zealand Open (cancelled): Dates: 18 June – 23 June; Host: Auckland, New Zealand; Venue: TBC; Level: Super 300; Prize: $210,000; Format: TBC	Score:	
17 June	New Zealand Open (cancelled): Dates: 18 June – 23 June; Host: Auckland, New Zealand; Venue: TBC; Level: Super 300; Prize: $210,000; Format: TBC	Score:	
17 June	New Zealand Open (cancelled): Dates: 18 June – 23 June; Host: Auckland, New Zealand; Venue: TBC; Level: Super 300; Prize: $210,000; Format: TBC	Score:	
17 June	New Zealand Open (cancelled): Dates: 18 June – 23 June; Host: Auckland, New Zealand; Venue: TBC; Level: Super 300; Prize: $210,000; Format: TBC	Score:	
17 June	Kaohsiung Masters (Draw): Dates: 18 June – 23 June; Host: Kaohsiung, Chinese Taipei; Venue: Kaohsiung Arena; Level: Super 100; Prize: $100,000; Format: 48MS/32WS/32MD/32WD/32XD	(Chinese Taipei) Lee Chia-hao	(Malaysia) Cheam June Wei
17 June	Kaohsiung Masters (Draw): Dates: 18 June – 23 June; Host: Kaohsiung, Chinese Taipei; Venue: Kaohsiung Arena; Level: Super 100; Prize: $100,000; Format: 48MS/32WS/32MD/32WD/32XD	Score: 21–15, 21–12	
17 June	Kaohsiung Masters (Draw): Dates: 18 June – 23 June; Host: Kaohsiung, Chinese Taipei; Venue: Kaohsiung Arena; Level: Super 100; Prize: $100,000; Format: 48MS/32WS/32MD/32WD/32XD	(Chinese Taipei) Hsu Wen-chi	(Chinese Taipei) Pai Yu-po
17 June	Kaohsiung Masters (Draw): Dates: 18 June – 23 June; Host: Kaohsiung, Chinese Taipei; Venue: Kaohsiung Arena; Level: Super 100; Prize: $100,000; Format: 48MS/32WS/32MD/32WD/32XD	Score: 22–20, 21–18	
17 June	Kaohsiung Masters (Draw): Dates: 18 June – 23 June; Host: Kaohsiung, Chinese Taipei; Venue: Kaohsiung Arena; Level: Super 100; Prize: $100,000; Format: 48MS/32WS/32MD/32WD/32XD	(Chinese Taipei) Chang Ko-chi (Chinese Taipei) Chen Xin-yuan	(Chinese Taipei) Chen Zhi-ray (Chinese Taipei) Lin Yu-chieh
17 June	Kaohsiung Masters (Draw): Dates: 18 June – 23 June; Host: Kaohsiung, Chinese Taipei; Venue: Kaohsiung Arena; Level: Super 100; Prize: $100,000; Format: 48MS/32WS/32MD/32WD/32XD	Score: 19–21, 21–16, 22–20	
17 June	Kaohsiung Masters (Draw): Dates: 18 June – 23 June; Host: Kaohsiung, Chinese Taipei; Venue: Kaohsiung Arena; Level: Super 100; Prize: $100,000; Format: 48MS/32WS/32MD/32WD/32XD	(Indonesia) Jesita Putri Miantoro (Indonesia) Febi Setianingrum	(Chinese Taipei) Sung Shuo-yun (Chinese Taipei) Yu Chien-hui
17 June	Kaohsiung Masters (Draw): Dates: 18 June – 23 June; Host: Kaohsiung, Chinese Taipei; Venue: Kaohsiung Arena; Level: Super 100; Prize: $100,000; Format: 48MS/32WS/32MD/32WD/32XD	Score: 21–14, 21–18	
17 June	Kaohsiung Masters (Draw): Dates: 18 June – 23 June; Host: Kaohsiung, Chinese Taipei; Venue: Kaohsiung Arena; Level: Super 100; Prize: $100,000; Format: 48MS/32WS/32MD/32WD/32XD	(Thailand) Ruttanapak Oupthong (Thailand) Jhenicha Sudjaipraparat	(Chinese Taipei) Yang Po-hsuan (Chinese Taipei) Hu Ling-fang
17 June	Kaohsiung Masters (Draw): Dates: 18 June – 23 June; Host: Kaohsiung, Chinese Taipei; Venue: Kaohsiung Arena; Level: Super 100; Prize: $100,000; Format: 48MS/32WS/32MD/32WD/32XD	Score: 21–18, 21–13	
24 June	U.S. Open (Draw): Dates: 25 June – 30 June; Host: Texas, United States; Venue: Fort Worth Convention Center; Level: Super 300; Prize: $210,000; Format: 32MS/32WS/32MD/32WD/32XD	(Japan) Yushi Tanaka	(China) Lei Lanxi
24 June	U.S. Open (Draw): Dates: 25 June – 30 June; Host: Texas, United States; Venue: Fort Worth Convention Center; Level: Super 300; Prize: $210,000; Format: 32MS/32WS/32MD/32WD/32XD	Score: 15–21, 21–18, 21–15	
24 June	U.S. Open (Draw): Dates: 25 June – 30 June; Host: Texas, United States; Venue: Fort Worth Convention Center; Level: Super 300; Prize: $210,000; Format: 32MS/32WS/32MD/32WD/32XD	(Japan) Natsuki Nidaira	(United States) Beiwen Zhang
24 June	U.S. Open (Draw): Dates: 25 June – 30 June; Host: Texas, United States; Venue: Fort Worth Convention Center; Level: Super 300; Prize: $210,000; Format: 32MS/32WS/32MD/32WD/32XD	Score: 17–21, 21–18, 24–22	
24 June	U.S. Open (Draw): Dates: 25 June – 30 June; Host: Texas, United States; Venue: Fort Worth Convention Center; Level: Super 300; Prize: $210,000; Format: 32MS/32WS/32MD/32WD/32XD	(Thailand) Peeratchai Sukphun (Thailand) Pakkapon Teeraratsakul	(Chinese Taipei) Liu Kuang-heng (Chinese Taipei) Yang Po-han
24 June	U.S. Open (Draw): Dates: 25 June – 30 June; Host: Texas, United States; Venue: Fort Worth Convention Center; Level: Super 300; Prize: $210,000; Format: 32MS/32WS/32MD/32WD/32XD	Score: 13–21, 21–16, 21–11	
24 June	U.S. Open (Draw): Dates: 25 June – 30 June; Host: Texas, United States; Venue: Fort Worth Convention Center; Level: Super 300; Prize: $210,000; Format: 32MS/32WS/32MD/32WD/32XD	(Japan) Rin Iwanaga (Japan) Kie Nakanishi	(Thailand) Laksika Kanlaha (Thailand) Phataimas Muenwong
24 June	U.S. Open (Draw): Dates: 25 June – 30 June; Host: Texas, United States; Venue: Fort Worth Convention Center; Level: Super 300; Prize: $210,000; Format: 32MS/32WS/32MD/32WD/32XD	Score: 21–19, 21–15	
24 June	U.S. Open (Draw): Dates: 25 June – 30 June; Host: Texas, United States; Venue: Fort Worth Convention Center; Level: Super 300; Prize: $210,000; Format: 32MS/32WS/32MD/32WD/32XD	(Thailand) Pakkapon Teeraratsakul (Thailand) Phataimas Muenwong	(Denmark) Jesper Toft (Denmark) Amalie Magelund
24 June	U.S. Open (Draw): Dates: 25 June – 30 June; Host: Texas, United States; Venue: Fort Worth Convention Center; Level: Super 300; Prize: $210,000; Format: 32MS/32WS/32MD/32WD/32XD	Score: 15–21, 21–19, 21–13	

=== July ===
Week commencing	Tournament	Champions	Runners-up
1 July	Canada Open (Draw): Dates: 2 July – 7 July; Host: Calgary, Canada; Venue: Markin-MacPhail Centre; Level: Super 500; Prize: $420,000; Format: 32MS/32WS/32MD/32WD/32XD	(Japan) Koki Watanabe	(France) Alex Lanier
1 July	Canada Open (Draw): Dates: 2 July – 7 July; Host: Calgary, Canada; Venue: Markin-MacPhail Centre; Level: Super 500; Prize: $420,000; Format: 32MS/32WS/32MD/32WD/32XD	Score: 20–22, 21–17, 21–6	
1 July	Canada Open (Draw): Dates: 2 July – 7 July; Host: Calgary, Canada; Venue: Markin-MacPhail Centre; Level: Super 500; Prize: $420,000; Format: 32MS/32WS/32MD/32WD/32XD	(Thailand) Busanan Ongbamrungphan	(Denmark) Line Kjærsfeldt
1 July	Canada Open (Draw): Dates: 2 July – 7 July; Host: Calgary, Canada; Venue: Markin-MacPhail Centre; Level: Super 500; Prize: $420,000; Format: 32MS/32WS/32MD/32WD/32XD	Score: 21–16, 21–14	
1 July	Canada Open (Draw): Dates: 2 July – 7 July; Host: Calgary, Canada; Venue: Markin-MacPhail Centre; Level: Super 500; Prize: $420,000; Format: 32MS/32WS/32MD/32WD/32XD	(Denmark) Kim Astrup (Denmark) Anders Skaarup Rasmussen	(England) Ben Lane (England) Sean Vendy
1 July	Canada Open (Draw): Dates: 2 July – 7 July; Host: Calgary, Canada; Venue: Markin-MacPhail Centre; Level: Super 500; Prize: $420,000; Format: 32MS/32WS/32MD/32WD/32XD	Score: 18–21, 21–14, 21–11	
1 July	Canada Open (Draw): Dates: 2 July – 7 July; Host: Calgary, Canada; Venue: Markin-MacPhail Centre; Level: Super 500; Prize: $420,000; Format: 32MS/32WS/32MD/32WD/32XD	(Japan) Rin Iwanaga (Japan) Kie Nakanishi	(Chinese Taipei) Hsu Yin-hui (Chinese Taipei) Lin Jhih-yun
1 July	Canada Open (Draw): Dates: 2 July – 7 July; Host: Calgary, Canada; Venue: Markin-MacPhail Centre; Level: Super 500; Prize: $420,000; Format: 32MS/32WS/32MD/32WD/32XD	Score: 21–13, 21–13	
1 July	Canada Open (Draw): Dates: 2 July – 7 July; Host: Calgary, Canada; Venue: Markin-MacPhail Centre; Level: Super 500; Prize: $420,000; Format: 32MS/32WS/32MD/32WD/32XD	(Denmark) Jesper Toft (Denmark) Amalie Magelund	(Denmark) Mathias Christiansen (Denmark) Alexandra Bøje
1 July	Canada Open (Draw): Dates: 2 July – 7 July; Host: Calgary, Canada; Venue: Markin-MacPhail Centre; Level: Super 500; Prize: $420,000; Format: 32MS/32WS/32MD/32WD/32XD	Score: 9–21, 24–22, 21–12	
1 July	Northern Marianas Open: Dates: 3 July – 7 July; Host: Saipan, Northern Mariana Islands; Venue: Gilbert C. Ada Gymnasium; Level: International Challenge; Prize: $15,000; Format: 64MS/32WS/32MD/32WD/32XD	(Chinese Taipei) Cheng Kai	(Malaysia) Justin Hoh
1 July	Northern Marianas Open: Dates: 3 July – 7 July; Host: Saipan, Northern Mariana Islands; Venue: Gilbert C. Ada Gymnasium; Level: International Challenge; Prize: $15,000; Format: 64MS/32WS/32MD/32WD/32XD	Score: 21–12, 22–20	
1 July	Northern Marianas Open: Dates: 3 July – 7 July; Host: Saipan, Northern Mariana Islands; Venue: Gilbert C. Ada Gymnasium; Level: International Challenge; Prize: $15,000; Format: 64MS/32WS/32MD/32WD/32XD	(Japan) Kaoru Sugiyama	(Japan) Sakura Masuki
1 July	Northern Marianas Open: Dates: 3 July – 7 July; Host: Saipan, Northern Mariana Islands; Venue: Gilbert C. Ada Gymnasium; Level: International Challenge; Prize: $15,000; Format: 64MS/32WS/32MD/32WD/32XD	Score: 21–17, 21–15	
1 July	Northern Marianas Open: Dates: 3 July – 7 July; Host: Saipan, Northern Mariana Islands; Venue: Gilbert C. Ada Gymnasium; Level: International Challenge; Prize: $15,000; Format: 64MS/32WS/32MD/32WD/32XD	(Japan) Takumi Nomura (Japan) Yuichi Shimogami	(Japan) Mahiro Kaneko (Japan) Shunya Ota
1 July	Northern Marianas Open: Dates: 3 July – 7 July; Host: Saipan, Northern Mariana Islands; Venue: Gilbert C. Ada Gymnasium; Level: International Challenge; Prize: $15,000; Format: 64MS/32WS/32MD/32WD/32XD	Score: 22–20, 21–18	
1 July	Northern Marianas Open: Dates: 3 July – 7 July; Host: Saipan, Northern Mariana Islands; Venue: Gilbert C. Ada Gymnasium; Level: International Challenge; Prize: $15,000; Format: 64MS/32WS/32MD/32WD/32XD	(Japan) Mizuki Otake (Japan) Miyu Takahashi	(Japan) Miki Kanehiro (Japan) Rui Kiyama
1 July	Northern Marianas Open: Dates: 3 July – 7 July; Host: Saipan, Northern Mariana Islands; Venue: Gilbert C. Ada Gymnasium; Level: International Challenge; Prize: $15,000; Format: 64MS/32WS/32MD/32WD/32XD	Score: 21–4, 21–10	
1 July	Northern Marianas Open: Dates: 3 July – 7 July; Host: Saipan, Northern Mariana Islands; Venue: Gilbert C. Ada Gymnasium; Level: International Challenge; Prize: $15,000; Format: 64MS/32WS/32MD/32WD/32XD	(Japan) Yuichi Shimogami (Japan) Sayaka Hobara	(Japan) Tori Aizawa (Japan) Hina Osawa
1 July	Northern Marianas Open: Dates: 3 July – 7 July; Host: Saipan, Northern Mariana Islands; Venue: Gilbert C. Ada Gymnasium; Level: International Challenge; Prize: $15,000; Format: 64MS/32WS/32MD/32WD/32XD	Score: 21–19, 21–12	
1 July	Réunion Open: Dates: 3 July – 7 July; Host: Saint Denis, Réunion; Venue: Gymnasium Champ Fleuri; Level: International Challenge; Prize: $25,000; Format: 32MS/32WS/32MD/16WD/32XD	(India) Tharun Mannepalli	(Japan) Yudai Okimoto
1 July	Réunion Open: Dates: 3 July – 7 July; Host: Saint Denis, Réunion; Venue: Gymnasium Champ Fleuri; Level: International Challenge; Prize: $25,000; Format: 32MS/32WS/32MD/16WD/32XD	Score: 21–15, 21–15	
1 July	Réunion Open: Dates: 3 July – 7 July; Host: Saint Denis, Réunion; Venue: Gymnasium Champ Fleuri; Level: International Challenge; Prize: $25,000; Format: 32MS/32WS/32MD/16WD/32XD	(India) Tasnim Mir	(India) Rakshitha Ramraj
1 July	Réunion Open: Dates: 3 July – 7 July; Host: Saint Denis, Réunion; Venue: Gymnasium Champ Fleuri; Level: International Challenge; Prize: $25,000; Format: 32MS/32WS/32MD/16WD/32XD	Score: 21–15, 21–19	
1 July	Réunion Open: Dates: 3 July – 7 July; Host: Saint Denis, Réunion; Venue: Gymnasium Champ Fleuri; Level: International Challenge; Prize: $25,000; Format: 32MS/32WS/32MD/16WD/32XD	(France) Julien Maio (France) William Villeger	(India) Prakash Raj (India) Gouse Shaik
1 July	Réunion Open: Dates: 3 July – 7 July; Host: Saint Denis, Réunion; Venue: Gymnasium Champ Fleuri; Level: International Challenge; Prize: $25,000; Format: 32MS/32WS/32MD/16WD/32XD	Score: 21–9, 21–14	
1 July	Réunion Open: Dates: 3 July – 7 July; Host: Saint Denis, Réunion; Venue: Gymnasium Champ Fleuri; Level: International Challenge; Prize: $25,000; Format: 32MS/32WS/32MD/16WD/32XD	(Japan) Kaho Osawa (Japan) Mai Tanabe	(Germany) Julia Meyer (Germany) Leona Michalski
1 July	Réunion Open: Dates: 3 July – 7 July; Host: Saint Denis, Réunion; Venue: Gymnasium Champ Fleuri; Level: International Challenge; Prize: $25,000; Format: 32MS/32WS/32MD/16WD/32XD	Score: 21–8, 21–8	
1 July	Réunion Open: Dates: 3 July – 7 July; Host: Saint Denis, Réunion; Venue: Gymnasium Champ Fleuri; Level: International Challenge; Prize: $25,000; Format: 32MS/32WS/32MD/16WD/32XD	(France) Julien Maio (France) Léa Palermo	(France) William Villeger (France) Flavie Vallet
1 July	Réunion Open: Dates: 3 July – 7 July; Host: Saint Denis, Réunion; Venue: Gymnasium Champ Fleuri; Level: International Challenge; Prize: $25,000; Format: 32MS/32WS/32MD/16WD/32XD	Score: 23–21, 21–12	
1 July	Future Series Nouvelle-Aquitaine: Dates: 4 July – 7 July; Host: Pessac, France; Venue: Salle Bellegrave; Level: Future Series; Format: 32MS/32WS/32MD/32WD/32XD	(England) Cholan Kayan	(France) Yohan Barbieri
1 July	Future Series Nouvelle-Aquitaine: Dates: 4 July – 7 July; Host: Pessac, France; Venue: Salle Bellegrave; Level: Future Series; Format: 32MS/32WS/32MD/32WD/32XD	Score: 21–8, 21–12	
1 July	Future Series Nouvelle-Aquitaine: Dates: 4 July – 7 July; Host: Pessac, France; Venue: Salle Bellegrave; Level: Future Series; Format: 32MS/32WS/32MD/32WD/32XD	(Czech Republic) Petra Maixnerová	(Republic of Ireland) Sophia Noble
1 July	Future Series Nouvelle-Aquitaine: Dates: 4 July – 7 July; Host: Pessac, France; Venue: Salle Bellegrave; Level: Future Series; Format: 32MS/32WS/32MD/32WD/32XD	Score: 21–8, 16–21, 21–11	
1 July	Future Series Nouvelle-Aquitaine: Dates: 4 July – 7 July; Host: Pessac, France; Venue: Salle Bellegrave; Level: Future Series; Format: 32MS/32WS/32MD/32WD/32XD	(France) Aymeric Tores (Netherlands) Dyon van Wijlick	(England) Oliver Butler (England) Samuel Jones
1 July	Future Series Nouvelle-Aquitaine: Dates: 4 July – 7 July; Host: Pessac, France; Venue: Salle Bellegrave; Level: Future Series; Format: 32MS/32WS/32MD/32WD/32XD	Score: 11–21, 21–17, 22–20	
1 July	Future Series Nouvelle-Aquitaine: Dates: 4 July – 7 July; Host: Pessac, France; Venue: Salle Bellegrave; Level: Future Series; Format: 32MS/32WS/32MD/32WD/32XD	(Netherlands) Meerte Loos (Netherlands) Kelly van Buiten	(England) Chloe Dennis (England) Natasha Lado
1 July	Future Series Nouvelle-Aquitaine: Dates: 4 July – 7 July; Host: Pessac, France; Venue: Salle Bellegrave; Level: Future Series; Format: 32MS/32WS/32MD/32WD/32XD	Score: 17–21, 21–9, 21–5	
1 July	Future Series Nouvelle-Aquitaine: Dates: 4 July – 7 July; Host: Pessac, France; Venue: Salle Bellegrave; Level: Future Series; Format: 32MS/32WS/32MD/32WD/32XD	(France) Aymeric Tores (France) Lilou Schaffner	(Netherlands) Timo Stoffelen (Netherlands) Meerte Loos
1 July	Future Series Nouvelle-Aquitaine: Dates: 4 July – 7 July; Host: Pessac, France; Venue: Salle Bellegrave; Level: Future Series; Format: 32MS/32WS/32MD/32WD/32XD	Score: 21–13, 21–7	
8 July	Saipan International: Dates: 9 July – 13 July; Host: Saipan, Northern Mariana Islands; Venue: Gilbert C. Ada Gymnasium; Level: International Challenge; Prize: $15,000; Format: 64MS/32WS/32MD/32WD/32XD	(Malaysia) Justin Hoh	(Japan) Ryoma Muramoto
8 July	Saipan International: Dates: 9 July – 13 July; Host: Saipan, Northern Mariana Islands; Venue: Gilbert C. Ada Gymnasium; Level: International Challenge; Prize: $15,000; Format: 64MS/32WS/32MD/32WD/32XD	Score: 21–16, 21–18	
8 July	Saipan International: Dates: 9 July – 13 July; Host: Saipan, Northern Mariana Islands; Venue: Gilbert C. Ada Gymnasium; Level: International Challenge; Prize: $15,000; Format: 64MS/32WS/32MD/32WD/32XD	(Japan) Riko Gunji	(Japan) Asuka Takahashi
8 July	Saipan International: Dates: 9 July – 13 July; Host: Saipan, Northern Mariana Islands; Venue: Gilbert C. Ada Gymnasium; Level: International Challenge; Prize: $15,000; Format: 64MS/32WS/32MD/32WD/32XD	Score: 21–14, 14–21, 21–16	
8 July	Saipan International: Dates: 9 July – 13 July; Host: Saipan, Northern Mariana Islands; Venue: Gilbert C. Ada Gymnasium; Level: International Challenge; Prize: $15,000; Format: 64MS/32WS/32MD/32WD/32XD	(Japan) Takumi Nomura (Japan) Yuichi Shimogami	(Japan) Tori Aizawa (Japan) Daisuke Sano
8 July	Saipan International: Dates: 9 July – 13 July; Host: Saipan, Northern Mariana Islands; Venue: Gilbert C. Ada Gymnasium; Level: International Challenge; Prize: $15,000; Format: 64MS/32WS/32MD/32WD/32XD	Score: 21–19, 23–21	
8 July	Saipan International: Dates: 9 July – 13 July; Host: Saipan, Northern Mariana Islands; Venue: Gilbert C. Ada Gymnasium; Level: International Challenge; Prize: $15,000; Format: 64MS/32WS/32MD/32WD/32XD	(Japan) Kokona Ishikawa (Japan) Mio Konegawa	(South Korea) Kim Hye-jeong (South Korea) Kim Yu-jung
8 July	Saipan International: Dates: 9 July – 13 July; Host: Saipan, Northern Mariana Islands; Venue: Gilbert C. Ada Gymnasium; Level: International Challenge; Prize: $15,000; Format: 64MS/32WS/32MD/32WD/32XD	Score: 21–19, 11–21, 21–18	
8 July	Saipan International: Dates: 9 July – 13 July; Host: Saipan, Northern Mariana Islands; Venue: Gilbert C. Ada Gymnasium; Level: International Challenge; Prize: $15,000; Format: 64MS/32WS/32MD/32WD/32XD	(Japan) Hiroki Nishi (Japan) Akari Sato	(Japan) Yuichi Shimogami (Japan) Sayaka Hobara
8 July	Saipan International: Dates: 9 July – 13 July; Host: Saipan, Northern Mariana Islands; Venue: Gilbert C. Ada Gymnasium; Level: International Challenge; Prize: $15,000; Format: 64MS/32WS/32MD/32WD/32XD	Score: 21–11, 21–10	
8 July	Mauritius International: Dates: 11 July – 14 July; Host: Rose Hill, Mauritius; Venue: National Badminton Center; Level: International Series; Prize: $5,000; Format: 32MS/32WS/32MD/16WD/32XD	(Japan) Yudai Okimoto	(Indonesia) Rizki Ansyahri
8 July	Mauritius International: Dates: 11 July – 14 July; Host: Rose Hill, Mauritius; Venue: National Badminton Center; Level: International Series; Prize: $5,000; Format: 32MS/32WS/32MD/16WD/32XD	Score: 16–21, 21–7, 21–14	
8 July	Mauritius International: Dates: 11 July – 14 July; Host: Rose Hill, Mauritius; Venue: National Badminton Center; Level: International Series; Prize: $5,000; Format: 32MS/32WS/32MD/16WD/32XD	(Japan) Nanaho Kondo	(France) Anna Tatranova
8 July	Mauritius International: Dates: 11 July – 14 July; Host: Rose Hill, Mauritius; Venue: National Badminton Center; Level: International Series; Prize: $5,000; Format: 32MS/32WS/32MD/16WD/32XD	Score: 21–15, 22–20	
8 July	Mauritius International: Dates: 11 July – 14 July; Host: Rose Hill, Mauritius; Venue: National Badminton Center; Level: International Series; Prize: $5,000; Format: 32MS/32WS/32MD/16WD/32XD	(France) Julien Maio (France) William Villeger	(Germany) Malik Bourakkadi (Germany) Marvin Datko
8 July	Mauritius International: Dates: 11 July – 14 July; Host: Rose Hill, Mauritius; Venue: National Badminton Center; Level: International Series; Prize: $5,000; Format: 32MS/32WS/32MD/16WD/32XD	Score: 18–21, 21–10, 21–6	
8 July	Mauritius International: Dates: 11 July – 14 July; Host: Rose Hill, Mauritius; Venue: National Badminton Center; Level: International Series; Prize: $5,000; Format: 32MS/32WS/32MD/16WD/32XD	(Japan) Kaho Osawa (Japan) Mai Tanabe	(Japan) Hina Shiwa (Japan) Chisa Yamafuji
8 July	Mauritius International: Dates: 11 July – 14 July; Host: Rose Hill, Mauritius; Venue: National Badminton Center; Level: International Series; Prize: $5,000; Format: 32MS/32WS/32MD/16WD/32XD	Score: 21–14, 21–17	
8 July	Mauritius International: Dates: 11 July – 14 July; Host: Rose Hill, Mauritius; Venue: National Badminton Center; Level: International Series; Prize: $5,000; Format: 32MS/32WS/32MD/16WD/32XD	(France) Julien Maio (France) Léa Palermo	(France) William Villeger (France) Flavie Vallet
8 July	Mauritius International: Dates: 11 July – 14 July; Host: Rose Hill, Mauritius; Venue: National Badminton Center; Level: International Series; Prize: $5,000; Format: 32MS/32WS/32MD/16WD/32XD	Score: 21–11, 21–14	
22 July	Olympic Games (Draw): Dates: 25 July – 5 August; Host: Paris, France; Venue: Porte de La Chapelle Arena; Level: Olympics; Format: 41MS/39WS/17MD/16WD/16XD	(Denmark) Viktor Axelsen	(Thailand) Kunlavut Vitidsarn
22 July	Olympic Games (Draw): Dates: 25 July – 5 August; Host: Paris, France; Venue: Porte de La Chapelle Arena; Level: Olympics; Format: 41MS/39WS/17MD/16WD/16XD	Score: 21–11, 21–11	
22 July	Olympic Games (Draw): Dates: 25 July – 5 August; Host: Paris, France; Venue: Porte de La Chapelle Arena; Level: Olympics; Format: 41MS/39WS/17MD/16WD/16XD	(South Korea) An Se-young	(China) He Bingjiao
22 July	Olympic Games (Draw): Dates: 25 July – 5 August; Host: Paris, France; Venue: Porte de La Chapelle Arena; Level: Olympics; Format: 41MS/39WS/17MD/16WD/16XD	Score: 21–13, 21–15	
22 July	Olympic Games (Draw): Dates: 25 July – 5 August; Host: Paris, France; Venue: Porte de La Chapelle Arena; Level: Olympics; Format: 41MS/39WS/17MD/16WD/16XD	(Chinese Taipei) Lee Yang (Chinese Taipei) Wang Chi-lin	(China) Liang Weikeng (China) Wang Chang
22 July	Olympic Games (Draw): Dates: 25 July – 5 August; Host: Paris, France; Venue: Porte de La Chapelle Arena; Level: Olympics; Format: 41MS/39WS/17MD/16WD/16XD	Score: 21–17, 18–21, 21–19	
22 July	Olympic Games (Draw): Dates: 25 July – 5 August; Host: Paris, France; Venue: Porte de La Chapelle Arena; Level: Olympics; Format: 41MS/39WS/17MD/16WD/16XD	(China) Chen Qingchen (China) Jia Yifan	(China) Liu Shengshu (China) Tan Ning
22 July	Olympic Games (Draw): Dates: 25 July – 5 August; Host: Paris, France; Venue: Porte de La Chapelle Arena; Level: Olympics; Format: 41MS/39WS/17MD/16WD/16XD	Score: 22–20, 21–15	
22 July	Olympic Games (Draw): Dates: 25 July – 5 August; Host: Paris, France; Venue: Porte de La Chapelle Arena; Level: Olympics; Format: 41MS/39WS/17MD/16WD/16XD	(China) Zheng Siwei (China) Huang Yaqiong	(South Korea) Kim Won-ho (South Korea) Jeong Na-eun
22 July	Olympic Games (Draw): Dates: 25 July – 5 August; Host: Paris, France; Venue: Porte de La Chapelle Arena; Level: Olympics; Format: 41MS/39WS/17MD/16WD/16XD	Score: 21–8, 21–11	

=== August ===
Week commencing	Tournament	Champions	Runners-up
5 August	Baoji China Masters (Draw): Dates: 6 August – 11 August; Host: Baoji, China; Venue: Baoji City Gymnasium; Level: Super 100; Prize: $100,000; Format: 48MS/32WS/32MD/32WD/32XD	(China) Hu Zhean	(China) Wang Zhengxing
5 August	Baoji China Masters (Draw): Dates: 6 August – 11 August; Host: Baoji, China; Venue: Baoji City Gymnasium; Level: Super 100; Prize: $100,000; Format: 48MS/32WS/32MD/32WD/32XD	Score: 21–18, 11–21, 21–14	
5 August	Baoji China Masters (Draw): Dates: 6 August – 11 August; Host: Baoji, China; Venue: Baoji City Gymnasium; Level: Super 100; Prize: $100,000; Format: 48MS/32WS/32MD/32WD/32XD	(China) Han Qianxi	(China) Dai Wang
5 August	Baoji China Masters (Draw): Dates: 6 August – 11 August; Host: Baoji, China; Venue: Baoji City Gymnasium; Level: Super 100; Prize: $100,000; Format: 48MS/32WS/32MD/32WD/32XD	Score: 21–23, 21–18, 22–20	
5 August	Baoji China Masters (Draw): Dates: 6 August – 11 August; Host: Baoji, China; Venue: Baoji City Gymnasium; Level: Super 100; Prize: $100,000; Format: 48MS/32WS/32MD/32WD/32XD	(China) Huang Di (China) Liu Yang	(China) Ma Shang (China) Zhu Haiyuan
5 August	Baoji China Masters (Draw): Dates: 6 August – 11 August; Host: Baoji, China; Venue: Baoji City Gymnasium; Level: Super 100; Prize: $100,000; Format: 48MS/32WS/32MD/32WD/32XD	Score: 21–17, 21–16	
5 August	Baoji China Masters (Draw): Dates: 6 August – 11 August; Host: Baoji, China; Venue: Baoji City Gymnasium; Level: Super 100; Prize: $100,000; Format: 48MS/32WS/32MD/32WD/32XD	(China) Chen Xiaofei (China) Feng Xueying	(China) Bao Lijing (China) Tang Ruizhi
5 August	Baoji China Masters (Draw): Dates: 6 August – 11 August; Host: Baoji, China; Venue: Baoji City Gymnasium; Level: Super 100; Prize: $100,000; Format: 48MS/32WS/32MD/32WD/32XD	Score: 21–15, 21–14	
5 August	Baoji China Masters (Draw): Dates: 6 August – 11 August; Host: Baoji, China; Venue: Baoji City Gymnasium; Level: Super 100; Prize: $100,000; Format: 48MS/32WS/32MD/32WD/32XD	(China) Zhang Hanyu (China) Bao Lijing	(China) Zhu Yijun (China) Li Huazhou
5 August	Baoji China Masters (Draw): Dates: 6 August – 11 August; Host: Baoji, China; Venue: Baoji City Gymnasium; Level: Super 100; Prize: $100,000; Format: 48MS/32WS/32MD/32WD/32XD	Score: 21–16, 19–21, 21–17	
12 August	Maldives International (cancelled): Dates: 12 August – 18 August; Host: Malé, Maldives; Venue: TBA; Level: International Challenge; Prize: $15,000; Format: 64MS/64WS/32MD/32WD/32XD		
12 August	Maldives International (cancelled): Dates: 12 August – 18 August; Host: Malé, Maldives; Venue: TBA; Level: International Challenge; Prize: $15,000; Format: 64MS/64WS/32MD/32WD/32XD	Score:	
12 August	Maldives International (cancelled): Dates: 12 August – 18 August; Host: Malé, Maldives; Venue: TBA; Level: International Challenge; Prize: $15,000; Format: 64MS/64WS/32MD/32WD/32XD	Score:	
12 August	Maldives International (cancelled): Dates: 12 August – 18 August; Host: Malé, Maldives; Venue: TBA; Level: International Challenge; Prize: $15,000; Format: 64MS/64WS/32MD/32WD/32XD	Score:	
12 August	Maldives International (cancelled): Dates: 12 August – 18 August; Host: Malé, Maldives; Venue: TBA; Level: International Challenge; Prize: $15,000; Format: 64MS/64WS/32MD/32WD/32XD	Score:	
12 August	Maldives International (cancelled): Dates: 12 August – 18 August; Host: Malé, Maldives; Venue: TBA; Level: International Challenge; Prize: $15,000; Format: 64MS/64WS/32MD/32WD/32XD	Score:	
19 August	Japan Open (Draw): Dates: 20 August – 25 August; Host: Yokohama, Japan; Venue: Yokohama Arena; Level: Super 750; Prize: $850,000; Format: 32MS/32WS/32MD/32WD/32XD	(France) Alex Lanier	(Chinese Taipei) Chou Tien-chen
19 August	Japan Open (Draw): Dates: 20 August – 25 August; Host: Yokohama, Japan; Venue: Yokohama Arena; Level: Super 750; Prize: $850,000; Format: 32MS/32WS/32MD/32WD/32XD	Score: 21–17, 22–20	
19 August	Japan Open (Draw): Dates: 20 August – 25 August; Host: Yokohama, Japan; Venue: Yokohama Arena; Level: Super 750; Prize: $850,000; Format: 32MS/32WS/32MD/32WD/32XD	(Japan) Akane Yamaguchi	(Thailand) Busanan Ongbamrungphan
19 August	Japan Open (Draw): Dates: 20 August – 25 August; Host: Yokohama, Japan; Venue: Yokohama Arena; Level: Super 750; Prize: $850,000; Format: 32MS/32WS/32MD/32WD/32XD	Score: 21–11, 21–10	
19 August	Japan Open (Draw): Dates: 20 August – 25 August; Host: Yokohama, Japan; Venue: Yokohama Arena; Level: Super 750; Prize: $850,000; Format: 32MS/32WS/32MD/32WD/32XD	(Malaysia) Goh Sze Fei (Malaysia) Nur Izzuddin	(South Korea) Kang Min-hyuk (South Korea) Seo Seung-jae
19 August	Japan Open (Draw): Dates: 20 August – 25 August; Host: Yokohama, Japan; Venue: Yokohama Arena; Level: Super 750; Prize: $850,000; Format: 32MS/32WS/32MD/32WD/32XD	Score: 21–19, 21–15	
19 August	Japan Open (Draw): Dates: 20 August – 25 August; Host: Yokohama, Japan; Venue: Yokohama Arena; Level: Super 750; Prize: $850,000; Format: 32MS/32WS/32MD/32WD/32XD	(China) Liu Shengshu (China) Tan Ning	(South Korea) Baek Ha-na (South Korea) Lee So-hee
19 August	Japan Open (Draw): Dates: 20 August – 25 August; Host: Yokohama, Japan; Venue: Yokohama Arena; Level: Super 750; Prize: $850,000; Format: 32MS/32WS/32MD/32WD/32XD	Score: 21–18, 22–20	
19 August	Japan Open (Draw): Dates: 20 August – 25 August; Host: Yokohama, Japan; Venue: Yokohama Arena; Level: Super 750; Prize: $850,000; Format: 32MS/32WS/32MD/32WD/32XD	(China) Jiang Zhenbang (China) Wei Yaxin	(Hong Kong) Tang Chun Man (Hong Kong) Tse Ying Suet
19 August	Japan Open (Draw): Dates: 20 August – 25 August; Host: Yokohama, Japan; Venue: Yokohama Arena; Level: Super 750; Prize: $850,000; Format: 32MS/32WS/32MD/32WD/32XD	Score: 21–12, 21–12	
19 August	Indonesia International (Pekanbaru): Dates: 20 August – 25 August; Host: Pekanbaru, Riau, Indonesia; Venue: GOR Remaja Pekanbaru; Level: International Challenge; Prize: $20,000; Format: 64MS/32WS/32MD/32WD/32XD	(Indonesia) Yohanes Saut Marcellyno	(Indonesia) Ikhsan Rumbay
19 August	Indonesia International (Pekanbaru): Dates: 20 August – 25 August; Host: Pekanbaru, Riau, Indonesia; Venue: GOR Remaja Pekanbaru; Level: International Challenge; Prize: $20,000; Format: 64MS/32WS/32MD/32WD/32XD	Score: 21–15, 21–7	
19 August	Indonesia International (Pekanbaru): Dates: 20 August – 25 August; Host: Pekanbaru, Riau, Indonesia; Venue: GOR Remaja Pekanbaru; Level: International Challenge; Prize: $20,000; Format: 64MS/32WS/32MD/32WD/32XD	(Japan) Hina Akechi	(Indonesia) Chiara Marvella Handoyo
19 August	Indonesia International (Pekanbaru): Dates: 20 August – 25 August; Host: Pekanbaru, Riau, Indonesia; Venue: GOR Remaja Pekanbaru; Level: International Challenge; Prize: $20,000; Format: 64MS/32WS/32MD/32WD/32XD	Score: 11–21, 21–18, 21–7	
19 August	Indonesia International (Pekanbaru): Dates: 20 August – 25 August; Host: Pekanbaru, Riau, Indonesia; Venue: GOR Remaja Pekanbaru; Level: International Challenge; Prize: $20,000; Format: 64MS/32WS/32MD/32WD/32XD	(South Korea) Ki Dong-ju (South Korea) Kim Jae-hyeon	(Indonesia) Raymond Indra (Indonesia) Patra Harapan Rindorindo
19 August	Indonesia International (Pekanbaru): Dates: 20 August – 25 August; Host: Pekanbaru, Riau, Indonesia; Venue: GOR Remaja Pekanbaru; Level: International Challenge; Prize: $20,000; Format: 64MS/32WS/32MD/32WD/32XD	Score: 21–15, 21–12	
19 August	Indonesia International (Pekanbaru): Dates: 20 August – 25 August; Host: Pekanbaru, Riau, Indonesia; Venue: GOR Remaja Pekanbaru; Level: International Challenge; Prize: $20,000; Format: 64MS/32WS/32MD/32WD/32XD	(Japan) Miki Kanehiro (Japan) Rui Kiyama	(Chinese Taipei) Lin Wan-ching (Chinese Taipei) Lin Xiao-min
19 August	Indonesia International (Pekanbaru): Dates: 20 August – 25 August; Host: Pekanbaru, Riau, Indonesia; Venue: GOR Remaja Pekanbaru; Level: International Challenge; Prize: $20,000; Format: 64MS/32WS/32MD/32WD/32XD	Score: 21–19, 21–18	
19 August	Indonesia International (Pekanbaru): Dates: 20 August – 25 August; Host: Pekanbaru, Riau, Indonesia; Venue: GOR Remaja Pekanbaru; Level: International Challenge; Prize: $20,000; Format: 64MS/32WS/32MD/32WD/32XD	(Indonesia) Jafar Hidayatullah (Indonesia) Felisha Pasaribu	(Indonesia) Adnan Maulana (Indonesia) Indah Cahya Sari Jamil
19 August	Indonesia International (Pekanbaru): Dates: 20 August – 25 August; Host: Pekanbaru, Riau, Indonesia; Venue: GOR Remaja Pekanbaru; Level: International Challenge; Prize: $20,000; Format: 64MS/32WS/32MD/32WD/32XD	Score: 21–18, 21–10	
26 August	Korea Open (Draw): Dates: 27 August – 1 September; Host: Mokpo, South Korea; Venue: Mokpo Indoor Stadium; Level: Super 500; Prize: $420,000; Format: 32MS/32WS/32MD/32WD/32XD	(China) Lu Guangzu	(Chinese Taipei) Lee Chia-hao
26 August	Korea Open (Draw): Dates: 27 August – 1 September; Host: Mokpo, South Korea; Venue: Mokpo Indoor Stadium; Level: Super 500; Prize: $420,000; Format: 32MS/32WS/32MD/32WD/32XD	Score: 21–16, 20–22, 21–18	
26 August	Korea Open (Draw): Dates: 27 August – 1 September; Host: Mokpo, South Korea; Venue: Mokpo Indoor Stadium; Level: Super 500; Prize: $420,000; Format: 32MS/32WS/32MD/32WD/32XD	(South Korea) Kim Ga-eun	(China) Wang Zhiyi
26 August	Korea Open (Draw): Dates: 27 August – 1 September; Host: Mokpo, South Korea; Venue: Mokpo Indoor Stadium; Level: Super 500; Prize: $420,000; Format: 32MS/32WS/32MD/32WD/32XD	Score: Walkover	
26 August	Korea Open (Draw): Dates: 27 August – 1 September; Host: Mokpo, South Korea; Venue: Mokpo Indoor Stadium; Level: Super 500; Prize: $420,000; Format: 32MS/32WS/32MD/32WD/32XD	(Indonesia) Leo Rolly Carnando (Indonesia) Bagas Maulana	(South Korea) Kang Min-hyuk (South Korea) Seo Seung-jae
26 August	Korea Open (Draw): Dates: 27 August – 1 September; Host: Mokpo, South Korea; Venue: Mokpo Indoor Stadium; Level: Super 500; Prize: $420,000; Format: 32MS/32WS/32MD/32WD/32XD	Score: 18–21, 21–9, 21–8	
26 August	Korea Open (Draw): Dates: 27 August – 1 September; Host: Mokpo, South Korea; Venue: Mokpo Indoor Stadium; Level: Super 500; Prize: $420,000; Format: 32MS/32WS/32MD/32WD/32XD	(South Korea) Jeong Na-eun (South Korea) Kim Hye-jeong	(Malaysia) Pearly Tan (Malaysia) Thinaah Muralitharan
26 August	Korea Open (Draw): Dates: 27 August – 1 September; Host: Mokpo, South Korea; Venue: Mokpo Indoor Stadium; Level: Super 500; Prize: $420,000; Format: 32MS/32WS/32MD/32WD/32XD	Score: 21–12, 21–11	
26 August	Korea Open (Draw): Dates: 27 August – 1 September; Host: Mokpo, South Korea; Venue: Mokpo Indoor Stadium; Level: Super 500; Prize: $420,000; Format: 32MS/32WS/32MD/32WD/32XD	(Malaysia) Chen Tang Jie (Malaysia) Toh Ee Wei	(China) Guo Xinwa (China) Li Qian
26 August	Korea Open (Draw): Dates: 27 August – 1 September; Host: Mokpo, South Korea; Venue: Mokpo Indoor Stadium; Level: Super 500; Prize: $420,000; Format: 32MS/32WS/32MD/32WD/32XD	Score: 17–21, 21–13, 21–13	
26 August	Indonesia Masters Super 100 I (Draw): Dates: 27 August – 1 September; Host: Pekanbaru, Indonesia; Venue: Gelanggang Remaja Pekanbaru; Level: Super 100; Prize: $100,000; Format: 48MS/32WS/32MD/32WD/32XD	(Indonesia) Zaki Ubaidillah	(Indonesia) Alwi Farhan
26 August	Indonesia Masters Super 100 I (Draw): Dates: 27 August – 1 September; Host: Pekanbaru, Indonesia; Venue: Gelanggang Remaja Pekanbaru; Level: Super 100; Prize: $100,000; Format: 48MS/32WS/32MD/32WD/32XD	Score: 21–16, 21–14	
26 August	Indonesia Masters Super 100 I (Draw): Dates: 27 August – 1 September; Host: Pekanbaru, Indonesia; Venue: Gelanggang Remaja Pekanbaru; Level: Super 100; Prize: $100,000; Format: 48MS/32WS/32MD/32WD/32XD	(Japan) Riko Gunji	(Japan) Hina Akechi
26 August	Indonesia Masters Super 100 I (Draw): Dates: 27 August – 1 September; Host: Pekanbaru, Indonesia; Venue: Gelanggang Remaja Pekanbaru; Level: Super 100; Prize: $100,000; Format: 48MS/32WS/32MD/32WD/32XD	Score: 21–10, 22–20	
26 August	Indonesia Masters Super 100 I (Draw): Dates: 27 August – 1 September; Host: Pekanbaru, Indonesia; Venue: Gelanggang Remaja Pekanbaru; Level: Super 100; Prize: $100,000; Format: 48MS/32WS/32MD/32WD/32XD	(Thailand) Chaloempon Charoenkitamorn (Thailand) Worrapol Thongsa-nga	(Indonesia) Rahmat Hidayat (Indonesia) Yeremia Rambitan
26 August	Indonesia Masters Super 100 I (Draw): Dates: 27 August – 1 September; Host: Pekanbaru, Indonesia; Venue: Gelanggang Remaja Pekanbaru; Level: Super 100; Prize: $100,000; Format: 48MS/32WS/32MD/32WD/32XD	Score: 21–19, 21–15	
26 August	Indonesia Masters Super 100 I (Draw): Dates: 27 August – 1 September; Host: Pekanbaru, Indonesia; Venue: Gelanggang Remaja Pekanbaru; Level: Super 100; Prize: $100,000; Format: 48MS/32WS/32MD/32WD/32XD	(Indonesia) Jesita Putri Miantoro (Indonesia) Febi Setianingrum	(Japan) Mizuki Otake (Japan) Miyu Takahashi
26 August	Indonesia Masters Super 100 I (Draw): Dates: 27 August – 1 September; Host: Pekanbaru, Indonesia; Venue: Gelanggang Remaja Pekanbaru; Level: Super 100; Prize: $100,000; Format: 48MS/32WS/32MD/32WD/32XD	Score: 21–15, 21–13	
26 August	Indonesia Masters Super 100 I (Draw): Dates: 27 August – 1 September; Host: Pekanbaru, Indonesia; Venue: Gelanggang Remaja Pekanbaru; Level: Super 100; Prize: $100,000; Format: 48MS/32WS/32MD/32WD/32XD	(Indonesia) Jafar Hidayatullah (Indonesia) Felisha Pasaribu	(Indonesia) Adnan Maulana (Indonesia) Indah Cahya Sari Jamil
26 August	Indonesia Masters Super 100 I (Draw): Dates: 27 August – 1 September; Host: Pekanbaru, Indonesia; Venue: Gelanggang Remaja Pekanbaru; Level: Super 100; Prize: $100,000; Format: 48MS/32WS/32MD/32WD/32XD	Score: 21–11, 21–19	
26 August	Myanmar International (cancelled): Dates: 27 August – 1 September; Host: Yangon, Myanmar; Venue: National Badminton Stadium; Level: Future Series; Format: 48MS/32WS/32MD/32WD/32XD		
26 August	Myanmar International (cancelled): Dates: 27 August – 1 September; Host: Yangon, Myanmar; Venue: National Badminton Stadium; Level: Future Series; Format: 48MS/32WS/32MD/32WD/32XD	Score:	
26 August	Myanmar International (cancelled): Dates: 27 August – 1 September; Host: Yangon, Myanmar; Venue: National Badminton Stadium; Level: Future Series; Format: 48MS/32WS/32MD/32WD/32XD	Score:	
26 August	Myanmar International (cancelled): Dates: 27 August – 1 September; Host: Yangon, Myanmar; Venue: National Badminton Stadium; Level: Future Series; Format: 48MS/32WS/32MD/32WD/32XD	Score:	
26 August	Myanmar International (cancelled): Dates: 27 August – 1 September; Host: Yangon, Myanmar; Venue: National Badminton Stadium; Level: Future Series; Format: 48MS/32WS/32MD/32WD/32XD	Score:	
26 August	Myanmar International (cancelled): Dates: 27 August – 1 September; Host: Yangon, Myanmar; Venue: National Badminton Stadium; Level: Future Series; Format: 48MS/32WS/32MD/32WD/32XD	Score:	
26 August	Mexico Future Series: Dates: 27 August – 1 September; Host: Aguascalientes, Ags., Mexico; Venue: Gimnasio Olimpico; Level: Future Series; Format: 32MS/32WS/16MD/16WD/16XD	(Canada) Joshua Nguyen	(Mexico) Luis Montoya
26 August	Mexico Future Series: Dates: 27 August – 1 September; Host: Aguascalientes, Ags., Mexico; Venue: Gimnasio Olimpico; Level: Future Series; Format: 32MS/32WS/16MD/16WD/16XD	Score: 21–12, 21–15	
26 August	Mexico Future Series: Dates: 27 August – 1 September; Host: Aguascalientes, Ags., Mexico; Venue: Gimnasio Olimpico; Level: Future Series; Format: 32MS/32WS/16MD/16WD/16XD	(United States) Ella Lin	(United States) Veronica Yang
26 August	Mexico Future Series: Dates: 27 August – 1 September; Host: Aguascalientes, Ags., Mexico; Venue: Gimnasio Olimpico; Level: Future Series; Format: 32MS/32WS/16MD/16WD/16XD	Score: 21–12, 17–21, 21–17	
26 August	Mexico Future Series: Dates: 27 August – 1 September; Host: Aguascalientes, Ags., Mexico; Venue: Gimnasio Olimpico; Level: Future Series; Format: 32MS/32WS/16MD/16WD/16XD	(United States) Ryan Ma (Canada) Daniel Zhou	(Guatemala) José Granados (Guatemala) Antonio Ortíz
26 August	Mexico Future Series: Dates: 27 August – 1 September; Host: Aguascalientes, Ags., Mexico; Venue: Gimnasio Olimpico; Level: Future Series; Format: 32MS/32WS/16MD/16WD/16XD	Score: 21–18, 21–15	
26 August	Mexico Future Series: Dates: 27 August – 1 September; Host: Aguascalientes, Ags., Mexico; Venue: Gimnasio Olimpico; Level: Future Series; Format: 32MS/32WS/16MD/16WD/16XD	(United States) Ella Lin (United States) Veronica Yang	(Mexico) Romina Fregoso (Mexico) Miriam Rodríguez
26 August	Mexico Future Series: Dates: 27 August – 1 September; Host: Aguascalientes, Ags., Mexico; Venue: Gimnasio Olimpico; Level: Future Series; Format: 32MS/32WS/16MD/16WD/16XD	Score: 21–14, 21–15	
26 August	Mexico Future Series: Dates: 27 August – 1 September; Host: Aguascalientes, Ags., Mexico; Venue: Gimnasio Olimpico; Level: Future Series; Format: 32MS/32WS/16MD/16WD/16XD	(Guatemala) Christopher Martínez (Guatemala) Diana Corleto	(United States) Ryan Ma (United States) Veronica Yang
26 August	Mexico Future Series: Dates: 27 August – 1 September; Host: Aguascalientes, Ags., Mexico; Venue: Gimnasio Olimpico; Level: Future Series; Format: 32MS/32WS/16MD/16WD/16XD	Score: 21–13, 21–17	
26 August	Lagos International: Dates: 28 August – 1 September; Host: Lagos, Nigeria; Venue: Teslim Balogun Stadium; Level: International Challenge; Prize: $15,000; Format: 32MS/32WS/32MD/16WD/32XD	(Vietnam) Lê Đức Phát	(India) Samarveer
26 August	Lagos International: Dates: 28 August – 1 September; Host: Lagos, Nigeria; Venue: Teslim Balogun Stadium; Level: International Challenge; Prize: $15,000; Format: 32MS/32WS/32MD/16WD/32XD	Score: 21–10, 18–21, 22–20	
26 August	Lagos International: Dates: 28 August – 1 September; Host: Lagos, Nigeria; Venue: Teslim Balogun Stadium; Level: International Challenge; Prize: $15,000; Format: 32MS/32WS/32MD/16WD/32XD	(India) Shreya Lele	(India) Kavipriya Selvam
26 August	Lagos International: Dates: 28 August – 1 September; Host: Lagos, Nigeria; Venue: Teslim Balogun Stadium; Level: International Challenge; Prize: $15,000; Format: 32MS/32WS/32MD/16WD/32XD	Score: 21–11, 21–16	
26 August	Lagos International: Dates: 28 August – 1 September; Host: Lagos, Nigeria; Venue: Teslim Balogun Stadium; Level: International Challenge; Prize: $15,000; Format: 32MS/32WS/32MD/16WD/32XD	(India) Pruthvi Krishnamurthy Roy (India) Vishnuvardhan Goud Panjala	(India) P. S. Ravikrishna (India) Akshan Shetty
26 August	Lagos International: Dates: 28 August – 1 September; Host: Lagos, Nigeria; Venue: Teslim Balogun Stadium; Level: International Challenge; Prize: $15,000; Format: 32MS/32WS/32MD/16WD/32XD	Score: 21–17, 21–19	
26 August	Lagos International: Dates: 28 August – 1 September; Host: Lagos, Nigeria; Venue: Teslim Balogun Stadium; Level: International Challenge; Prize: $15,000; Format: 32MS/32WS/32MD/16WD/32XD	(India) Kavipriya Selvam (India) Simran Singhi	(India) Vaishnavi Khadkekar (India) Alisha Khan
26 August	Lagos International: Dates: 28 August – 1 September; Host: Lagos, Nigeria; Venue: Teslim Balogun Stadium; Level: International Challenge; Prize: $15,000; Format: 32MS/32WS/32MD/16WD/32XD	Score: 21–11, 21–16	
26 August	Lagos International: Dates: 28 August – 1 September; Host: Lagos, Nigeria; Venue: Teslim Balogun Stadium; Level: International Challenge; Prize: $15,000; Format: 32MS/32WS/32MD/16WD/32XD	(India) Sathwik Reddy Kanapuram (India) Vaishnavi Khadkekar	(Nigeria) Alhaji Aliyu Shehu (Nigeria) Uchechukwu Deborah Ukeh
26 August	Lagos International: Dates: 28 August – 1 September; Host: Lagos, Nigeria; Venue: Teslim Balogun Stadium; Level: International Challenge; Prize: $15,000; Format: 32MS/32WS/32MD/16WD/32XD	Score: 21–12, 21–14	
26 August	Latvia International: Dates: 28 August – 1 September; Host: Riga, Latvia; Venue: Rimi Olympic Centre; Level: Future Series; Format: 32MS/32WS/32MD/32WD/32XD	(Croatia) Aria Dinata	(France) Valentin Singer
26 August	Latvia International: Dates: 28 August – 1 September; Host: Riga, Latvia; Venue: Rimi Olympic Centre; Level: Future Series; Format: 32MS/32WS/32MD/32WD/32XD	Score: 14–21, 21–12, 21–18	
26 August	Latvia International: Dates: 28 August – 1 September; Host: Riga, Latvia; Venue: Rimi Olympic Centre; Level: Future Series; Format: 32MS/32WS/32MD/32WD/32XD	(Finland) Nella Nyqvist	(Republic of Ireland) Sophia Noble
26 August	Latvia International: Dates: 28 August – 1 September; Host: Riga, Latvia; Venue: Rimi Olympic Centre; Level: Future Series; Format: 32MS/32WS/32MD/32WD/32XD	Score: 21–8, 21–14	
26 August	Latvia International: Dates: 28 August – 1 September; Host: Riga, Latvia; Venue: Rimi Olympic Centre; Level: Future Series; Format: 32MS/32WS/32MD/32WD/32XD	(Germany) Jonathan Dresp (Germany) Aaron Sonnenschein	(France) Thibault Gardon (France) Ewan Goulin
26 August	Latvia International: Dates: 28 August – 1 September; Host: Riga, Latvia; Venue: Rimi Olympic Centre; Level: Future Series; Format: 32MS/32WS/32MD/32WD/32XD	Score: 15–21, 21–18, 22–20	
26 August	Latvia International: Dates: 28 August – 1 September; Host: Riga, Latvia; Venue: Rimi Olympic Centre; Level: Future Series; Format: 32MS/32WS/32MD/32WD/32XD	(Poland) Anastasia Khomich (Poland) Daria Zimnol	(France) Agathe Cuevas (France) Kathell Desmots-Chacun
26 August	Latvia International: Dates: 28 August – 1 September; Host: Riga, Latvia; Venue: Rimi Olympic Centre; Level: Future Series; Format: 32MS/32WS/32MD/32WD/32XD	Score: 6–21, 21–17, 24–22	
26 August	Latvia International: Dates: 28 August – 1 September; Host: Riga, Latvia; Venue: Rimi Olympic Centre; Level: Future Series; Format: 32MS/32WS/32MD/32WD/32XD	(Estonia) Kristjan Kaljurand (Estonia) Helina Rüütel	(Republic of Ireland) Joshua Magee (Republic of Ireland) Moya Ryan
26 August	Latvia International: Dates: 28 August – 1 September; Host: Riga, Latvia; Venue: Rimi Olympic Centre; Level: Future Series; Format: 32MS/32WS/32MD/32WD/32XD	Score: 19–21, 21–16, 21–15	

=== September ===
Week commencing	Tournament	Champions	Runners-up
2 September	Taipei Open (Draw): Dates: 3 September – 8 September; Host: Taipei, Taiwan; Venue: Taipei Arena; Level: Super 300; Prize: $210,000; Format: 32MS/32WS/32MD/32WD/32XD	(Chinese Taipei) Lin Chun-yi	(Chinese Taipei) Chi Yu-jen
2 September	Taipei Open (Draw): Dates: 3 September – 8 September; Host: Taipei, Taiwan; Venue: Taipei Arena; Level: Super 300; Prize: $210,000; Format: 32MS/32WS/32MD/32WD/32XD	Score: 21–17, 21–13	
2 September	Taipei Open (Draw): Dates: 3 September – 8 September; Host: Taipei, Taiwan; Venue: Taipei Arena; Level: Super 300; Prize: $210,000; Format: 32MS/32WS/32MD/32WD/32XD	(South Korea) Sim Yu-jin	(Indonesia) Putri Kusuma Wardani
2 September	Taipei Open (Draw): Dates: 3 September – 8 September; Host: Taipei, Taiwan; Venue: Taipei Arena; Level: Super 300; Prize: $210,000; Format: 32MS/32WS/32MD/32WD/32XD	Score: 21–17, 21–13	
2 September	Taipei Open (Draw): Dates: 3 September – 8 September; Host: Taipei, Taiwan; Venue: Taipei Arena; Level: Super 300; Prize: $210,000; Format: 32MS/32WS/32MD/32WD/32XD	(Chinese Taipei) Lee Jhe-huei (Chinese Taipei) Yang Po-hsuan	(Chinese Taipei) Chiang Chien-wei (Chinese Taipei) Wu Hsuan-yi
2 September	Taipei Open (Draw): Dates: 3 September – 8 September; Host: Taipei, Taiwan; Venue: Taipei Arena; Level: Super 300; Prize: $210,000; Format: 32MS/32WS/32MD/32WD/32XD	Score: 21–7, 25–23	
2 September	Taipei Open (Draw): Dates: 3 September – 8 September; Host: Taipei, Taiwan; Venue: Taipei Arena; Level: Super 300; Prize: $210,000; Format: 32MS/32WS/32MD/32WD/32XD	(Indonesia) Febriana Dwipuji Kusuma (Indonesia) Amallia Cahaya Pratiwi	(Indonesia) Jesita Putri Miantoro (Indonesia) Febi Setianingrum
2 September	Taipei Open (Draw): Dates: 3 September – 8 September; Host: Taipei, Taiwan; Venue: Taipei Arena; Level: Super 300; Prize: $210,000; Format: 32MS/32WS/32MD/32WD/32XD	Score: 21–15, 21–16	
2 September	Taipei Open (Draw): Dates: 3 September – 8 September; Host: Taipei, Taiwan; Venue: Taipei Arena; Level: Super 300; Prize: $210,000; Format: 32MS/32WS/32MD/32WD/32XD	(Thailand) Pakkapon Teeraratsakul (Thailand) Phataimas Muenwong	(Chinese Taipei) Yang Po-hsuan (Chinese Taipei) Hu Ling-fang
2 September	Taipei Open (Draw): Dates: 3 September – 8 September; Host: Taipei, Taiwan; Venue: Taipei Arena; Level: Super 300; Prize: $210,000; Format: 32MS/32WS/32MD/32WD/32XD	Score: 21–17, 21–19	
2 September	Myanmar International (cancelled): Dates: 3 September – 8 September; Host: Yangon, Myanmar; Venue: National Badminton Stadium; Level: International Series; Prize: $5,000; Format: 32MS/32WS/32MD/32WD/32XD		
2 September	Myanmar International (cancelled): Dates: 3 September – 8 September; Host: Yangon, Myanmar; Venue: National Badminton Stadium; Level: International Series; Prize: $5,000; Format: 32MS/32WS/32MD/32WD/32XD	Score:	
2 September	Myanmar International (cancelled): Dates: 3 September – 8 September; Host: Yangon, Myanmar; Venue: National Badminton Stadium; Level: International Series; Prize: $5,000; Format: 32MS/32WS/32MD/32WD/32XD	Score:	
2 September	Myanmar International (cancelled): Dates: 3 September – 8 September; Host: Yangon, Myanmar; Venue: National Badminton Stadium; Level: International Series; Prize: $5,000; Format: 32MS/32WS/32MD/32WD/32XD	Score:	
2 September	Myanmar International (cancelled): Dates: 3 September – 8 September; Host: Yangon, Myanmar; Venue: National Badminton Stadium; Level: International Series; Prize: $5,000; Format: 32MS/32WS/32MD/32WD/32XD	Score:	
2 September	Myanmar International (cancelled): Dates: 3 September – 8 September; Host: Yangon, Myanmar; Venue: National Badminton Stadium; Level: International Series; Prize: $5,000; Format: 32MS/32WS/32MD/32WD/32XD	Score:	
2 September	Guatemala Future Series: Dates: 4 September – 8 September; Host: Guatemala City, Guatemala; Venue: Coliseo Deportivo; Level: Future Series; Format: 32MS/32WS/16MD/8WD/16XD	(Peru) Adriano Viale	(Portugal) Bruno Carvalho
2 September	Guatemala Future Series: Dates: 4 September – 8 September; Host: Guatemala City, Guatemala; Venue: Coliseo Deportivo; Level: Future Series; Format: 32MS/32WS/16MD/8WD/16XD	Score: 21–14, 21–7	
2 September	Guatemala Future Series: Dates: 4 September – 8 September; Host: Guatemala City, Guatemala; Venue: Coliseo Deportivo; Level: Future Series; Format: 32MS/32WS/16MD/8WD/16XD	(France) Romane Cloteaux-Foucault	(Guatemala) Nikté Sotomayor
2 September	Guatemala Future Series: Dates: 4 September – 8 September; Host: Guatemala City, Guatemala; Venue: Coliseo Deportivo; Level: Future Series; Format: 32MS/32WS/16MD/8WD/16XD	Score: 21–15, 25–23	
2 September	Guatemala Future Series: Dates: 4 September – 8 September; Host: Guatemala City, Guatemala; Venue: Coliseo Deportivo; Level: Future Series; Format: 32MS/32WS/16MD/8WD/16XD	(Guatemala) Christopher Martínez (Guatemala) Jonathan Solís	(Peru) Sharum Durand (Peru) José Guevara
2 September	Guatemala Future Series: Dates: 4 September – 8 September; Host: Guatemala City, Guatemala; Venue: Coliseo Deportivo; Level: Future Series; Format: 32MS/32WS/16MD/8WD/16XD	Score: 21–16, 21–9	
2 September	Guatemala Future Series: Dates: 4 September – 8 September; Host: Guatemala City, Guatemala; Venue: Coliseo Deportivo; Level: Future Series; Format: 32MS/32WS/16MD/8WD/16XD	(Guatemala) Diana Corleto (Guatemala) Nikté Sotomayor	(Peru) Fernanda Munar (Peru) Rafaela Munar
2 September	Guatemala Future Series: Dates: 4 September – 8 September; Host: Guatemala City, Guatemala; Venue: Coliseo Deportivo; Level: Future Series; Format: 32MS/32WS/16MD/8WD/16XD	Score: 21–13, 21–14	
2 September	Guatemala Future Series: Dates: 4 September – 8 September; Host: Guatemala City, Guatemala; Venue: Coliseo Deportivo; Level: Future Series; Format: 32MS/32WS/16MD/8WD/16XD	(Guatemala) Christopher Martínez (Guatemala) Diana Corleto	(El Salvador) Javier Alas (El Salvador) Fátima Centeno
2 September	Guatemala Future Series: Dates: 4 September – 8 September; Host: Guatemala City, Guatemala; Venue: Coliseo Deportivo; Level: Future Series; Format: 32MS/32WS/16MD/8WD/16XD	Score: 21–7, 21–8	
2 September	Slovenia Future Series: Dates: 5 September – 8 September; Host: Ljubljana, Slovenia; Venue: Sport hall Dolgi most; Level: Future Series; Format: 64MS/64WS/32MD/32WD/32XD	(France) Enogat Roy	(France) Sacha Lévêque
2 September	Slovenia Future Series: Dates: 5 September – 8 September; Host: Ljubljana, Slovenia; Venue: Sport hall Dolgi most; Level: Future Series; Format: 64MS/64WS/32MD/32WD/32XD	Score: 21–17, 21–10	
2 September	Slovenia Future Series: Dates: 5 September – 8 September; Host: Ljubljana, Slovenia; Venue: Sport hall Dolgi most; Level: Future Series; Format: 64MS/64WS/32MD/32WD/32XD	(France) Anna Tatranova	(Czech Republic) Petra Maixnerová
2 September	Slovenia Future Series: Dates: 5 September – 8 September; Host: Ljubljana, Slovenia; Venue: Sport hall Dolgi most; Level: Future Series; Format: 64MS/64WS/32MD/32WD/32XD	Score: 21–18, 20–22, 21–14	
2 September	Slovenia Future Series: Dates: 5 September – 8 September; Host: Ljubljana, Slovenia; Venue: Sport hall Dolgi most; Level: Future Series; Format: 64MS/64WS/32MD/32WD/32XD	(Switzerland) Yann Orteu (Switzerland) Minh Quang Pham	(Slovenia) Miha Ivančič (Slovenia) Rok Jercinovic
2 September	Slovenia Future Series: Dates: 5 September – 8 September; Host: Ljubljana, Slovenia; Venue: Sport hall Dolgi most; Level: Future Series; Format: 64MS/64WS/32MD/32WD/32XD	Score: 21–15, 23–21	
2 September	Slovenia Future Series: Dates: 5 September – 8 September; Host: Ljubljana, Slovenia; Venue: Sport hall Dolgi most; Level: Future Series; Format: 64MS/64WS/32MD/32WD/32XD	(Switzerland) Lucie Amiguet (Switzerland) Caroline Racloz	(Italy) Martina Corsini (Italy) Emma Piccinin
2 September	Slovenia Future Series: Dates: 5 September – 8 September; Host: Ljubljana, Slovenia; Venue: Sport hall Dolgi most; Level: Future Series; Format: 64MS/64WS/32MD/32WD/32XD	Score: 21–17, 15–21, 21–18	
2 September	Slovenia Future Series: Dates: 5 September – 8 September; Host: Ljubljana, Slovenia; Venue: Sport hall Dolgi most; Level: Future Series; Format: 64MS/64WS/32MD/32WD/32XD	(Slovenia) Miha Ivančič (Slovenia) Petra Polanc	(Italy) David Salutt (Italy) Martina Corsini
2 September	Slovenia Future Series: Dates: 5 September – 8 September; Host: Ljubljana, Slovenia; Venue: Sport hall Dolgi most; Level: Future Series; Format: 64MS/64WS/32MD/32WD/32XD	Score: 21–17, 21–15	
9 September	Hong Kong Open (Draw): Dates: 10 – 15 September; Host: Kowloon, Hong Kong; Venue: Hong Kong Coliseum; Level: Super 500; Prize: $420,000; Format: 32MS/32WS/32MD/32WD/32XD	(Denmark) Viktor Axelsen	(China) Lei Lanxi
9 September	Hong Kong Open (Draw): Dates: 10 – 15 September; Host: Kowloon, Hong Kong; Venue: Hong Kong Coliseum; Level: Super 500; Prize: $420,000; Format: 32MS/32WS/32MD/32WD/32XD	Score: 21–9, 21–12	
9 September	Hong Kong Open (Draw): Dates: 10 – 15 September; Host: Kowloon, Hong Kong; Venue: Hong Kong Coliseum; Level: Super 500; Prize: $420,000; Format: 32MS/32WS/32MD/32WD/32XD	(China) Han Yue	(Indonesia) Putri Kusuma Wardani
9 September	Hong Kong Open (Draw): Dates: 10 – 15 September; Host: Kowloon, Hong Kong; Venue: Hong Kong Coliseum; Level: Super 500; Prize: $420,000; Format: 32MS/32WS/32MD/32WD/32XD	Score: 21–18, 21–7	
9 September	Hong Kong Open (Draw): Dates: 10 – 15 September; Host: Kowloon, Hong Kong; Venue: Hong Kong Coliseum; Level: Super 500; Prize: $420,000; Format: 32MS/32WS/32MD/32WD/32XD	(South Korea) Kang Min-hyuk (South Korea) Seo Seung-jae	(Indonesia) Sabar Karyaman Gutama (Indonesia) Muhammad Reza Pahlevi Isfahani
9 September	Hong Kong Open (Draw): Dates: 10 – 15 September; Host: Kowloon, Hong Kong; Venue: Hong Kong Coliseum; Level: Super 500; Prize: $420,000; Format: 32MS/32WS/32MD/32WD/32XD	Score: 21–13, 21–17	
9 September	Hong Kong Open (Draw): Dates: 10 – 15 September; Host: Kowloon, Hong Kong; Venue: Hong Kong Coliseum; Level: Super 500; Prize: $420,000; Format: 32MS/32WS/32MD/32WD/32XD	(Malaysia) Pearly Tan (Malaysia) Thinaah Muralitharan	(China) Liu Shengshu (China) Tan Ning
9 September	Hong Kong Open (Draw): Dates: 10 – 15 September; Host: Kowloon, Hong Kong; Venue: Hong Kong Coliseum; Level: Super 500; Prize: $420,000; Format: 32MS/32WS/32MD/32WD/32XD	Score: 21–14, 21–14	
9 September	Hong Kong Open (Draw): Dates: 10 – 15 September; Host: Kowloon, Hong Kong; Venue: Hong Kong Coliseum; Level: Super 500; Prize: $420,000; Format: 32MS/32WS/32MD/32WD/32XD	(China) Jiang Zhenbang (China) Wei Yaxin	(China) Feng Yanzhe (China) Huang Dongping
9 September	Hong Kong Open (Draw): Dates: 10 – 15 September; Host: Kowloon, Hong Kong; Venue: Hong Kong Coliseum; Level: Super 500; Prize: $420,000; Format: 32MS/32WS/32MD/32WD/32XD	Score: 21–17, 21–19	
9 September	Vietnam Open (Draw): Dates: 10 – 15 September; Host: Ho Chi Minh City, Vietnam; Venue: Nguyen Du Club; Level: Super 100; Prize: $100,000; Format: 48MS/32WS/32MD/32WD/32XD	(Japan) Shogo Ogawa	(China) Wang Zhengxing
9 September	Vietnam Open (Draw): Dates: 10 – 15 September; Host: Ho Chi Minh City, Vietnam; Venue: Nguyen Du Club; Level: Super 100; Prize: $100,000; Format: 48MS/32WS/32MD/32WD/32XD	Score: 21–19, 22–20	
9 September	Vietnam Open (Draw): Dates: 10 – 15 September; Host: Ho Chi Minh City, Vietnam; Venue: Nguyen Du Club; Level: Super 100; Prize: $100,000; Format: 48MS/32WS/32MD/32WD/32XD	(Vietnam) Nguyễn Thùy Linh	(Japan) Kaoru Sugiyama
9 September	Vietnam Open (Draw): Dates: 10 – 15 September; Host: Ho Chi Minh City, Vietnam; Venue: Nguyen Du Club; Level: Super 100; Prize: $100,000; Format: 48MS/32WS/32MD/32WD/32XD	Score: 21–15, 22–20	
9 September	Vietnam Open (Draw): Dates: 10 – 15 September; Host: Ho Chi Minh City, Vietnam; Venue: Nguyen Du Club; Level: Super 100; Prize: $100,000; Format: 48MS/32WS/32MD/32WD/32XD	(Chinese Taipei) He Zhi-wei (Chinese Taipei) Huang Jui-hsuan	(Indonesia) Raymond Indra (Indonesia) Patra Harapan Rindorindo
9 September	Vietnam Open (Draw): Dates: 10 – 15 September; Host: Ho Chi Minh City, Vietnam; Venue: Nguyen Du Club; Level: Super 100; Prize: $100,000; Format: 48MS/32WS/32MD/32WD/32XD	Score: 16–21, 21–19, 21–18	
9 September	Vietnam Open (Draw): Dates: 10 – 15 September; Host: Ho Chi Minh City, Vietnam; Venue: Nguyen Du Club; Level: Super 100; Prize: $100,000; Format: 48MS/32WS/32MD/32WD/32XD	(Japan) Mizuki Otake (Japan) Miyu Takahashi	(Thailand) Tidapron Kleebyeesun (Thailand) Nattamon Laisuan
9 September	Vietnam Open (Draw): Dates: 10 – 15 September; Host: Ho Chi Minh City, Vietnam; Venue: Nguyen Du Club; Level: Super 100; Prize: $100,000; Format: 48MS/32WS/32MD/32WD/32XD	Score: 19–21, 22–20, 21–7	
9 September	Vietnam Open (Draw): Dates: 10 – 15 September; Host: Ho Chi Minh City, Vietnam; Venue: Nguyen Du Club; Level: Super 100; Prize: $100,000; Format: 48MS/32WS/32MD/32WD/32XD	(Indonesia) Adnan Maulana (Indonesia) Indah Cahya Sari Jamil	(Indonesia) Zaidan Arrafi Awal Nabawi (Indonesia) Jessica Maya Rismawardani
9 September	Vietnam Open (Draw): Dates: 10 – 15 September; Host: Ho Chi Minh City, Vietnam; Venue: Nguyen Du Club; Level: Super 100; Prize: $100,000; Format: 48MS/32WS/32MD/32WD/32XD	Score: 21–15, 21–15	
9 September	Costa Rica Future Series: Dates: 10 September – 14 September; Host: San José, Costa Rica; Venue: BN Arena de la Ciudad Deportiva; Level: Future Series; Format: 32MS/32WS/32MD/16WD/32XD	(Peru) Adriano Viale	(Morocco) Driss Bourroum
9 September	Costa Rica Future Series: Dates: 10 September – 14 September; Host: San José, Costa Rica; Venue: BN Arena de la Ciudad Deportiva; Level: Future Series; Format: 32MS/32WS/32MD/16WD/32XD	Score: 21–17, 21–13	
9 September	Costa Rica Future Series: Dates: 10 September – 14 September; Host: San José, Costa Rica; Venue: BN Arena de la Ciudad Deportiva; Level: Future Series; Format: 32MS/32WS/32MD/16WD/32XD	(Canada) Chloe Hoang	(France) Romane Cloteaux-Foucault
9 September	Costa Rica Future Series: Dates: 10 September – 14 September; Host: San José, Costa Rica; Venue: BN Arena de la Ciudad Deportiva; Level: Future Series; Format: 32MS/32WS/32MD/16WD/32XD	Score: 21–14, 12–21, 21–6	
9 September	Costa Rica Future Series: Dates: 10 September – 14 September; Host: San José, Costa Rica; Venue: BN Arena de la Ciudad Deportiva; Level: Future Series; Format: 32MS/32WS/32MD/16WD/32XD	(Portugal) Bruno Carvalho (Portugal) Diogo Gloria	(Canada) Kiren Milan Deraj (Canada) Eason Wong
9 September	Costa Rica Future Series: Dates: 10 September – 14 September; Host: San José, Costa Rica; Venue: BN Arena de la Ciudad Deportiva; Level: Future Series; Format: 32MS/32WS/32MD/16WD/32XD	Score: 21–16, 21–15	
9 September	Costa Rica Future Series: Dates: 10 September – 14 September; Host: San José, Costa Rica; Venue: BN Arena de la Ciudad Deportiva; Level: Future Series; Format: 32MS/32WS/32MD/16WD/32XD	(Peru) Fernanda Munar (Peru) Rafaela Munar	(El Salvador) Fátima Centeno (El Salvador) Daniela Hernández
9 September	Costa Rica Future Series: Dates: 10 September – 14 September; Host: San José, Costa Rica; Venue: BN Arena de la Ciudad Deportiva; Level: Future Series; Format: 32MS/32WS/32MD/16WD/32XD	Score: 21–10, 21–11	
9 September	Costa Rica Future Series: Dates: 10 September – 14 September; Host: San José, Costa Rica; Venue: BN Arena de la Ciudad Deportiva; Level: Future Series; Format: 32MS/32WS/32MD/16WD/32XD	(Canada) Timothy Lock (Canada) Chloe Hoang	(El Salvador) Javier Alas (El Salvador) Fátima Centeno
9 September	Costa Rica Future Series: Dates: 10 September – 14 September; Host: San José, Costa Rica; Venue: BN Arena de la Ciudad Deportiva; Level: Future Series; Format: 32MS/32WS/32MD/16WD/32XD	Score: 21–13, 21–12	
9 September	Belgian International: Dates: 11 September – 14 September; Host: Leuven, Belgium; Venue: Sportoase; Level: International Challenge; Prize: $20,000; Format: 32MS/32WS/32MD/32WD/32XD	(Belgium) Julien Carraggi	(Denmark) Mads Christophersen
9 September	Belgian International: Dates: 11 September – 14 September; Host: Leuven, Belgium; Venue: Sportoase; Level: International Challenge; Prize: $20,000; Format: 32MS/32WS/32MD/32WD/32XD	Score: 21–16, 12–21, 21–19	
9 September	Belgian International: Dates: 11 September – 14 September; Host: Leuven, Belgium; Venue: Sportoase; Level: International Challenge; Prize: $20,000; Format: 32MS/32WS/32MD/32WD/32XD	(India) Anmol Kharb	(Denmark) Amalie Schulz
9 September	Belgian International: Dates: 11 September – 14 September; Host: Leuven, Belgium; Venue: Sportoase; Level: International Challenge; Prize: $20,000; Format: 32MS/32WS/32MD/32WD/32XD	Score: 24–22, 12–21, 21–10	
9 September	Belgian International: Dates: 11 September – 14 September; Host: Leuven, Belgium; Venue: Sportoase; Level: International Challenge; Prize: $20,000; Format: 32MS/32WS/32MD/32WD/32XD	(Netherlands) Ties van der Lecq (Netherlands) Brian Wassink	(France) Julien Maio (France) William Villeger
9 September	Belgian International: Dates: 11 September – 14 September; Host: Leuven, Belgium; Venue: Sportoase; Level: International Challenge; Prize: $20,000; Format: 32MS/32WS/32MD/32WD/32XD	Score: 21–17, 22–20	
9 September	Belgian International: Dates: 11 September – 14 September; Host: Leuven, Belgium; Venue: Sportoase; Level: International Challenge; Prize: $20,000; Format: 32MS/32WS/32MD/32WD/32XD	(Scotland) Julie MacPherson (Scotland) Ciara Torrance	(France) Elsa Jacob (France) Camille Pognante
9 September	Belgian International: Dates: 11 September – 14 September; Host: Leuven, Belgium; Venue: Sportoase; Level: International Challenge; Prize: $20,000; Format: 32MS/32WS/32MD/32WD/32XD	Score: 21–9, 21–11	
9 September	Belgian International: Dates: 11 September – 14 September; Host: Leuven, Belgium; Venue: Sportoase; Level: International Challenge; Prize: $20,000; Format: 32MS/32WS/32MD/32WD/32XD	(Denmark) Rasmus Espersen (Denmark) Amalie Cecilie Kudsk	(France) Grégoire Deschamp (Denmark) Iben Bergstein
9 September	Belgian International: Dates: 11 September – 14 September; Host: Leuven, Belgium; Venue: Sportoase; Level: International Challenge; Prize: $20,000; Format: 32MS/32WS/32MD/32WD/32XD	Score: 21–15, 21–17	
16 September	China Open (Draw): Dates: 17 – 22 September; Host: Changzhou, China; Venue: Olympic Sports Center Gymnasium; Level: Super 1000; Prize: $2,000,000; Format: 32MS/32WS/32MD/32WD/32XD	(China) Weng Hongyang	(Japan) Kodai Naraoka
16 September	China Open (Draw): Dates: 17 – 22 September; Host: Changzhou, China; Venue: Olympic Sports Center Gymnasium; Level: Super 1000; Prize: $2,000,000; Format: 32MS/32WS/32MD/32WD/32XD	Score: 21–17, 21–12	
16 September	China Open (Draw): Dates: 17 – 22 September; Host: Changzhou, China; Venue: Olympic Sports Center Gymnasium; Level: Super 1000; Prize: $2,000,000; Format: 32MS/32WS/32MD/32WD/32XD	(China) Wang Zhiyi	(Japan) Tomoka Miyazaki
16 September	China Open (Draw): Dates: 17 – 22 September; Host: Changzhou, China; Venue: Olympic Sports Center Gymnasium; Level: Super 1000; Prize: $2,000,000; Format: 32MS/32WS/32MD/32WD/32XD	Score: 21–17, 21–15	
16 September	China Open (Draw): Dates: 17 – 22 September; Host: Changzhou, China; Venue: Olympic Sports Center Gymnasium; Level: Super 1000; Prize: $2,000,000; Format: 32MS/32WS/32MD/32WD/32XD	(Malaysia) Goh Sze Fei (Malaysia) Nur Izzuddin	(China) He Jiting (China) Ren Xiangyu
16 September	China Open (Draw): Dates: 17 – 22 September; Host: Changzhou, China; Venue: Olympic Sports Center Gymnasium; Level: Super 1000; Prize: $2,000,000; Format: 32MS/32WS/32MD/32WD/32XD	Score: 13–21, 21–12, 21–17	
16 September	China Open (Draw): Dates: 17 – 22 September; Host: Changzhou, China; Venue: Olympic Sports Center Gymnasium; Level: Super 1000; Prize: $2,000,000; Format: 32MS/32WS/32MD/32WD/32XD	(China) Li Yijing (China) Luo Xumin	(China) Li Wenmei (China) Zhang Shuxian
16 September	China Open (Draw): Dates: 17 – 22 September; Host: Changzhou, China; Venue: Olympic Sports Center Gymnasium; Level: Super 1000; Prize: $2,000,000; Format: 32MS/32WS/32MD/32WD/32XD	Score: 11–21, 21–18, 21–8	
16 September	China Open (Draw): Dates: 17 – 22 September; Host: Changzhou, China; Venue: Olympic Sports Center Gymnasium; Level: Super 1000; Prize: $2,000,000; Format: 32MS/32WS/32MD/32WD/32XD	(China) Feng Yanzhe (China) Huang Dongping	(Malaysia) Goh Soon Huat (Malaysia) Shevon Jemie Lai
16 September	China Open (Draw): Dates: 17 – 22 September; Host: Changzhou, China; Venue: Olympic Sports Center Gymnasium; Level: Super 1000; Prize: $2,000,000; Format: 32MS/32WS/32MD/32WD/32XD	Score: 16–21, 21–14, 21–17	
16 September	Malaysia International: Dates: 17 September – 22 September; Host: Perak, Malaysia; Venue: Arena Badminton Perak; Level: International Challenge; Prize: $25,000; Format: 64MS/32WS/32MD/32WD/32XD	(Japan) Minoru Koga	(Japan) Riku Hatano
16 September	Malaysia International: Dates: 17 September – 22 September; Host: Perak, Malaysia; Venue: Arena Badminton Perak; Level: International Challenge; Prize: $25,000; Format: 64MS/32WS/32MD/32WD/32XD	Score: 21–19, 15–21, 21–11	
16 September	Malaysia International: Dates: 17 September – 22 September; Host: Perak, Malaysia; Venue: Arena Badminton Perak; Level: International Challenge; Prize: $25,000; Format: 64MS/32WS/32MD/32WD/32XD	(Japan) Riko Gunji	(Indonesia) Ruzana
16 September	Malaysia International: Dates: 17 September – 22 September; Host: Perak, Malaysia; Venue: Arena Badminton Perak; Level: International Challenge; Prize: $25,000; Format: 64MS/32WS/32MD/32WD/32XD	Score: 19–21, 21–15, 21–11	
16 September	Malaysia International: Dates: 17 September – 22 September; Host: Perak, Malaysia; Venue: Arena Badminton Perak; Level: International Challenge; Prize: $25,000; Format: 64MS/32WS/32MD/32WD/32XD	(Philippines) Solomon Padiz Jr. (Philippines) Julius Villabrille	(Malaysia) Lim Tze Jian (Malaysia) Wong Tien Ci
16 September	Malaysia International: Dates: 17 September – 22 September; Host: Perak, Malaysia; Venue: Arena Badminton Perak; Level: International Challenge; Prize: $25,000; Format: 64MS/32WS/32MD/32WD/32XD	Score: 14–21, 23–21, 21–16	
16 September	Malaysia International: Dates: 17 September – 22 September; Host: Perak, Malaysia; Venue: Arena Badminton Perak; Level: International Challenge; Prize: $25,000; Format: 64MS/32WS/32MD/32WD/32XD	(Japan) Naru Shinoya (Japan) Nao Yamakita	(Japan) Hinata Suzuki (Japan) An Uesugi
16 September	Malaysia International: Dates: 17 September – 22 September; Host: Perak, Malaysia; Venue: Arena Badminton Perak; Level: International Challenge; Prize: $25,000; Format: 64MS/32WS/32MD/32WD/32XD	Score: 21–13, 12–21, 21–17	
16 September	Malaysia International: Dates: 17 September – 22 September; Host: Perak, Malaysia; Venue: Arena Badminton Perak; Level: International Challenge; Prize: $25,000; Format: 64MS/32WS/32MD/32WD/32XD	(Indonesia) Amri Syahnawi (Indonesia) Nita Violina Marwah	(Indonesia) Adnan Maulana (Indonesia) Indah Cahya Sari Jamil
16 September	Malaysia International: Dates: 17 September – 22 September; Host: Perak, Malaysia; Venue: Arena Badminton Perak; Level: International Challenge; Prize: $25,000; Format: 64MS/32WS/32MD/32WD/32XD	Score: 22–24, 21–11, 21–19	
16 September	Polish International: Dates: 18 September – 22 September; Host: Lublin, Poland; Venue: Sport Hall of Medical University in Lublin; Level: International Series; Prize: $5,000; Format: 32MS/32WS/32MD/32WD/32XD	(Denmark) Ditlev Jaeger Holm	(Sweden) Gustav Bjorkler
16 September	Polish International: Dates: 18 September – 22 September; Host: Lublin, Poland; Venue: Sport Hall of Medical University in Lublin; Level: International Series; Prize: $5,000; Format: 32MS/32WS/32MD/32WD/32XD	Score: 21–15, 21–17	
16 September	Polish International: Dates: 18 September – 22 September; Host: Lublin, Poland; Venue: Sport Hall of Medical University in Lublin; Level: International Series; Prize: $5,000; Format: 32MS/32WS/32MD/32WD/32XD	(India) Anmol Kharb	(Switzerland) Milena Schnider
16 September	Polish International: Dates: 18 September – 22 September; Host: Lublin, Poland; Venue: Sport Hall of Medical University in Lublin; Level: International Series; Prize: $5,000; Format: 32MS/32WS/32MD/32WD/32XD	Score: 21–12, 21–8	
16 September	Polish International: Dates: 18 September – 22 September; Host: Lublin, Poland; Venue: Sport Hall of Medical University in Lublin; Level: International Series; Prize: $5,000; Format: 32MS/32WS/32MD/32WD/32XD	(Singapore) Wesley Koh (Singapore) Junsuke Kubo	(Poland) Robert Cybulski (Poland) Szymon Slepecki
16 September	Polish International: Dates: 18 September – 22 September; Host: Lublin, Poland; Venue: Sport Hall of Medical University in Lublin; Level: International Series; Prize: $5,000; Format: 32MS/32WS/32MD/32WD/32XD	Score: 21–16, 21–14	
16 September	Polish International: Dates: 18 September – 22 September; Host: Lublin, Poland; Venue: Sport Hall of Medical University in Lublin; Level: International Series; Prize: $5,000; Format: 32MS/32WS/32MD/32WD/32XD	(Poland) Paulina Hankiewicz (Poland) Kornelia Marczak	(Poland) Wiktoria Dąbczyńska (Poland) Zuzanna Jankowska
16 September	Polish International: Dates: 18 September – 22 September; Host: Lublin, Poland; Venue: Sport Hall of Medical University in Lublin; Level: International Series; Prize: $5,000; Format: 32MS/32WS/32MD/32WD/32XD	Score: 21–18, 11–21, 21–14	
16 September	Polish International: Dates: 18 September – 22 September; Host: Lublin, Poland; Venue: Sport Hall of Medical University in Lublin; Level: International Series; Prize: $5,000; Format: 32MS/32WS/32MD/32WD/32XD	(Denmark) Kristoffer Kolding (Denmark) Mette Werge	(Republic of Ireland) Joshua Magee (Republic of Ireland) Moya Ryan
16 September	Polish International: Dates: 18 September – 22 September; Host: Lublin, Poland; Venue: Sport Hall of Medical University in Lublin; Level: International Series; Prize: $5,000; Format: 32MS/32WS/32MD/32WD/32XD	Score: 21–15, 21–18	
23 September	Macau Open (Draw): Date: 24 – 29 September; Host: Macau; Venue: Macao East Asian Games Dome; Level: Super 300; Prize: $210,000; Format: 32MS/32WS/32MD/32WD/32XD	(Hong Kong) Ng Ka Long	(Singapore) Jason Teh
23 September	Macau Open (Draw): Date: 24 – 29 September; Host: Macau; Venue: Macao East Asian Games Dome; Level: Super 300; Prize: $210,000; Format: 32MS/32WS/32MD/32WD/32XD	Score: 21–19, 21–17	
23 September	Macau Open (Draw): Date: 24 – 29 September; Host: Macau; Venue: Macao East Asian Games Dome; Level: Super 300; Prize: $210,000; Format: 32MS/32WS/32MD/32WD/32XD	(China) Gao Fangjie	(Chinese Taipei) Lin Hsiang-ti
23 September	Macau Open (Draw): Date: 24 – 29 September; Host: Macau; Venue: Macao East Asian Games Dome; Level: Super 300; Prize: $210,000; Format: 32MS/32WS/32MD/32WD/32XD	Score: 21–23, 21–9, 21–11	
23 September	Macau Open (Draw): Date: 24 – 29 September; Host: Macau; Venue: Macao East Asian Games Dome; Level: Super 300; Prize: $210,000; Format: 32MS/32WS/32MD/32WD/32XD	(China) Chen Xujun (China) Liu Yi	(Indonesia) Sabar Karyaman Gutama (Indonesia) Muhammad Reza Pahlevi Isfahani
23 September	Macau Open (Draw): Date: 24 – 29 September; Host: Macau; Venue: Macao East Asian Games Dome; Level: Super 300; Prize: $210,000; Format: 32MS/32WS/32MD/32WD/32XD	Score: 21–18, 21–14	
23 September	Macau Open (Draw): Date: 24 – 29 September; Host: Macau; Venue: Macao East Asian Games Dome; Level: Super 300; Prize: $210,000; Format: 32MS/32WS/32MD/32WD/32XD	(China) Li Wenmei (China) Zhang Shuxian	(Chinese Taipei) Hsieh Pei-shan (Chinese Taipei) Hung En-tzu
23 September	Macau Open (Draw): Date: 24 – 29 September; Host: Macau; Venue: Macao East Asian Games Dome; Level: Super 300; Prize: $210,000; Format: 32MS/32WS/32MD/32WD/32XD	Score: 25–23, 18–21, 22–20	
23 September	Macau Open (Draw): Date: 24 – 29 September; Host: Macau; Venue: Macao East Asian Games Dome; Level: Super 300; Prize: $210,000; Format: 32MS/32WS/32MD/32WD/32XD	(China) Guo Xinwa (China) Chen Fanghui	(Indonesia) Dejan Ferdinansyah (Indonesia) Gloria Emanuelle Widjaja
23 September	Macau Open (Draw): Date: 24 – 29 September; Host: Macau; Venue: Macao East Asian Games Dome; Level: Super 300; Prize: $210,000; Format: 32MS/32WS/32MD/32WD/32XD	Score: 21–15, 21–18	
23 September	Iran International Khazar Cup (cancelled): Date: 24 – 28 September; Host: Sari, Iran; Venue: Sari Sports Hall; Level: Future Series; Prize: $5,000; Format: 64MS/64WS/32MD/32WD/16XD		
23 September	Iran International Khazar Cup (cancelled): Date: 24 – 28 September; Host: Sari, Iran; Venue: Sari Sports Hall; Level: Future Series; Prize: $5,000; Format: 64MS/64WS/32MD/32WD/16XD	Score:	
23 September	Iran International Khazar Cup (cancelled): Date: 24 – 28 September; Host: Sari, Iran; Venue: Sari Sports Hall; Level: Future Series; Prize: $5,000; Format: 64MS/64WS/32MD/32WD/16XD	Score:	
23 September	Iran International Khazar Cup (cancelled): Date: 24 – 28 September; Host: Sari, Iran; Venue: Sari Sports Hall; Level: Future Series; Prize: $5,000; Format: 64MS/64WS/32MD/32WD/16XD	Score:	
23 September	Iran International Khazar Cup (cancelled): Date: 24 – 28 September; Host: Sari, Iran; Venue: Sari Sports Hall; Level: Future Series; Prize: $5,000; Format: 64MS/64WS/32MD/32WD/16XD	Score:	
23 September	Iran International Khazar Cup (cancelled): Date: 24 – 28 September; Host: Sari, Iran; Venue: Sari Sports Hall; Level: Future Series; Prize: $5,000; Format: 64MS/64WS/32MD/32WD/16XD	Score:	
23 September	Kampala International: Date: 26 – 29 September; Host: Kampala, Uganda; Venue: Lugogo Indoor Stadium; Level: Future Series; Prize: $4,000; Format: 32MS/32WS/32MD/16WD/32XD	(India) Manraj Singh	(Scotland) Callum Smith
23 September	Kampala International: Date: 26 – 29 September; Host: Kampala, Uganda; Venue: Lugogo Indoor Stadium; Level: Future Series; Prize: $4,000; Format: 32MS/32WS/32MD/16WD/32XD	Score: 21–10, 21–13	
23 September	Kampala International: Date: 26 – 29 September; Host: Kampala, Uganda; Venue: Lugogo Indoor Stadium; Level: Future Series; Prize: $4,000; Format: 32MS/32WS/32MD/16WD/32XD	(India) Shreya Lele	(United Arab Emirates) Sreeyuktha Sreejith Parol
23 September	Kampala International: Date: 26 – 29 September; Host: Kampala, Uganda; Venue: Lugogo Indoor Stadium; Level: Future Series; Prize: $4,000; Format: 32MS/32WS/32MD/16WD/32XD	Score: 21–8, 21–8	
23 September	Kampala International: Date: 26 – 29 September; Host: Kampala, Uganda; Venue: Lugogo Indoor Stadium; Level: Future Series; Prize: $4,000; Format: 32MS/32WS/32MD/16WD/32XD	(Malaysia) Ariffin Nazri Zakaria (Malaysia) Ashraf Daniel Zakaria	(India) Viplav Kuvale (India) Viraj Kuvale
23 September	Kampala International: Date: 26 – 29 September; Host: Kampala, Uganda; Venue: Lugogo Indoor Stadium; Level: Future Series; Prize: $4,000; Format: 32MS/32WS/32MD/16WD/32XD	Score: 26–24, 21–18	
23 September	Kampala International: Date: 26 – 29 September; Host: Kampala, Uganda; Venue: Lugogo Indoor Stadium; Level: Future Series; Prize: $4,000; Format: 32MS/32WS/32MD/16WD/32XD	(India) Gayatri Rawat (India) Mansa Rawat	(Uganda) Fadilah Mohamed Rafi (Uganda) Tracy Naluwooza
23 September	Kampala International: Date: 26 – 29 September; Host: Kampala, Uganda; Venue: Lugogo Indoor Stadium; Level: Future Series; Prize: $4,000; Format: 32MS/32WS/32MD/16WD/32XD	Score: 21–5, 21–11	
23 September	Kampala International: Date: 26 – 29 September; Host: Kampala, Uganda; Venue: Lugogo Indoor Stadium; Level: Future Series; Prize: $4,000; Format: 32MS/32WS/32MD/16WD/32XD	(Malaysia) Ashraf Daniel Zakaria (Malaysia) Lim Xuan	(Azerbaijan) Agil Gabilov (Azerbaijan) Era Maftuha
23 September	Kampala International: Date: 26 – 29 September; Host: Kampala, Uganda; Venue: Lugogo Indoor Stadium; Level: Future Series; Prize: $4,000; Format: 32MS/32WS/32MD/16WD/32XD	Score: 21–18, 21–17	
23 September	Croatian International: Date: 26 – 29 September; Host: Samobor, Croatia; Venue: Sport hall Samobor; Level: Future Series; Format: 32MS/32WS/32MD/32WD/32XD	(Indonesia) Rizki Ansyahri	(Belgium) Charles Fouyn
23 September	Croatian International: Date: 26 – 29 September; Host: Samobor, Croatia; Venue: Sport hall Samobor; Level: Future Series; Format: 32MS/32WS/32MD/32WD/32XD	Score: 21–17, 21–19	
23 September	Croatian International: Date: 26 – 29 September; Host: Samobor, Croatia; Venue: Sport hall Samobor; Level: Future Series; Format: 32MS/32WS/32MD/32WD/32XD	(India) Raksha Kandasamy	(England) Leona Lee
23 September	Croatian International: Date: 26 – 29 September; Host: Samobor, Croatia; Venue: Sport hall Samobor; Level: Future Series; Format: 32MS/32WS/32MD/32WD/32XD	Score: 21–9, 21–5	
23 September	Croatian International: Date: 26 – 29 September; Host: Samobor, Croatia; Venue: Sport hall Samobor; Level: Future Series; Format: 32MS/32WS/32MD/32WD/32XD	(Serbia) Viktor Petrović (Serbia) Mihajlo Tomić	(Germany) Jonathan Dresp (Germany) Aaron Sonnenschein
23 September	Croatian International: Date: 26 – 29 September; Host: Samobor, Croatia; Venue: Sport hall Samobor; Level: Future Series; Format: 32MS/32WS/32MD/32WD/32XD	Score: 16–21, 21–17, 21–18	
23 September	Croatian International: Date: 26 – 29 September; Host: Samobor, Croatia; Venue: Sport hall Samobor; Level: Future Series; Format: 32MS/32WS/32MD/32WD/32XD	(Austria) Serena Au Yeong (Austria) Anna Hagspiel	(Bulgaria) Tanya Ivanova (Bulgaria) Gergana Pavlova
23 September	Croatian International: Date: 26 – 29 September; Host: Samobor, Croatia; Venue: Sport hall Samobor; Level: Future Series; Format: 32MS/32WS/32MD/32WD/32XD	Score: 21–15, 21–16	
23 September	Croatian International: Date: 26 – 29 September; Host: Samobor, Croatia; Venue: Sport hall Samobor; Level: Future Series; Format: 32MS/32WS/32MD/32WD/32XD	(Serbia) Mihajlo Tomić (Serbia) Andjela Vitman	(Germany) Jonathan Dresp (Germany) Lara Käpplein
23 September	Croatian International: Date: 26 – 29 September; Host: Samobor, Croatia; Venue: Sport hall Samobor; Level: Future Series; Format: 32MS/32WS/32MD/32WD/32XD	Score: 19–21, 21–19, 21–19	

=== October ===
Week commencing	Tournament	Champions	Runners-up
30 September	Abu Dhabi Masters (cancelled): Date: 1 October – 6 October; Host: Abu Dhabi, United Arab Emirates; Venue: TBA; Level: Super 100; Prize: $120,000; Format: 48MS/32WS/32MD/32WD/32XD		
30 September	Abu Dhabi Masters (cancelled): Date: 1 October – 6 October; Host: Abu Dhabi, United Arab Emirates; Venue: TBA; Level: Super 100; Prize: $120,000; Format: 48MS/32WS/32MD/32WD/32XD	Score:	
30 September	Abu Dhabi Masters (cancelled): Date: 1 October – 6 October; Host: Abu Dhabi, United Arab Emirates; Venue: TBA; Level: Super 100; Prize: $120,000; Format: 48MS/32WS/32MD/32WD/32XD	Score:	
30 September	Abu Dhabi Masters (cancelled): Date: 1 October – 6 October; Host: Abu Dhabi, United Arab Emirates; Venue: TBA; Level: Super 100; Prize: $120,000; Format: 48MS/32WS/32MD/32WD/32XD	Score:	
30 September	Abu Dhabi Masters (cancelled): Date: 1 October – 6 October; Host: Abu Dhabi, United Arab Emirates; Venue: TBA; Level: Super 100; Prize: $120,000; Format: 48MS/32WS/32MD/32WD/32XD	Score:	
30 September	Abu Dhabi Masters (cancelled): Date: 1 October – 6 October; Host: Abu Dhabi, United Arab Emirates; Venue: TBA; Level: Super 100; Prize: $120,000; Format: 48MS/32WS/32MD/32WD/32XD	Score:	
30 September	Uganda International: Dates: 3 October – 6 October; Host: Kampala, Uganda; Venue: Lugogo Indoor Stadium; Level: International Series; Prize: $10,000; Format: 32MS/32WS/32MD/16WD/32XD	(India) B. M. Rahul Bharadwaj	(India) Manraj Singh
30 September	Uganda International: Dates: 3 October – 6 October; Host: Kampala, Uganda; Venue: Lugogo Indoor Stadium; Level: International Series; Prize: $10,000; Format: 32MS/32WS/32MD/16WD/32XD	Score: 21–15, 21–16	
30 September	Uganda International: Dates: 3 October – 6 October; Host: Kampala, Uganda; Venue: Lugogo Indoor Stadium; Level: International Series; Prize: $10,000; Format: 32MS/32WS/32MD/16WD/32XD	(Malaysia) Loh Zhi Wei	(India) Shreya Lele
30 September	Uganda International: Dates: 3 October – 6 October; Host: Kampala, Uganda; Venue: Lugogo Indoor Stadium; Level: International Series; Prize: $10,000; Format: 32MS/32WS/32MD/16WD/32XD	Score: 21–15, 21–17	
30 September	Uganda International: Dates: 3 October – 6 October; Host: Kampala, Uganda; Venue: Lugogo Indoor Stadium; Level: International Series; Prize: $10,000; Format: 32MS/32WS/32MD/16WD/32XD	(India) Nithin H. V. (India) Venkata Harsha Vardhan Rayudu Veeramreddy	(India) Abinash Mohanty (India) Ayush Pattanayak
30 September	Uganda International: Dates: 3 October – 6 October; Host: Kampala, Uganda; Venue: Lugogo Indoor Stadium; Level: International Series; Prize: $10,000; Format: 32MS/32WS/32MD/16WD/32XD	Score: 21–10, 21–18	
30 September	Uganda International: Dates: 3 October – 6 October; Host: Kampala, Uganda; Venue: Lugogo Indoor Stadium; Level: International Series; Prize: $10,000; Format: 32MS/32WS/32MD/16WD/32XD	(India) Gayatri Rawat (India) Mansa Rawat	(United Arab Emirates) Nidhi Desai (United Arab Emirates) Sreeyuktha Sreejith Parol
30 September	Uganda International: Dates: 3 October – 6 October; Host: Kampala, Uganda; Venue: Lugogo Indoor Stadium; Level: International Series; Prize: $10,000; Format: 32MS/32WS/32MD/16WD/32XD	Score: 21–8, 21–8	
30 September	Uganda International: Dates: 3 October – 6 October; Host: Kampala, Uganda; Venue: Lugogo Indoor Stadium; Level: International Series; Prize: $10,000; Format: 32MS/32WS/32MD/16WD/32XD	(Malaysia) Ashraf Daniel Zakaria (Malaysia) Lim Xuan	(Malaysia) Andy Yew Tung Kok (Malaysia) Loh Zhi Wei
30 September	Uganda International: Dates: 3 October – 6 October; Host: Kampala, Uganda; Venue: Lugogo Indoor Stadium; Level: International Series; Prize: $10,000; Format: 32MS/32WS/32MD/16WD/32XD	Score: 21–19, 22–20	
30 September	Bulgarian International: Dates: 3 October – 6 October; Host: Sofia, Bulgaria; Venue: Badminton Hall "Europe"; Level: Future Series; Format: 32MS/32WS/32MD/16WD/32XD	(Sweden) Gustav Bjorkler	(Spain) Álvaro Vázquez
30 September	Bulgarian International: Dates: 3 October – 6 October; Host: Sofia, Bulgaria; Venue: Badminton Hall "Europe"; Level: Future Series; Format: 32MS/32WS/32MD/16WD/32XD	Score: 21–15, 21–19	
30 September	Bulgarian International: Dates: 3 October – 6 October; Host: Sofia, Bulgaria; Venue: Badminton Hall "Europe"; Level: Future Series; Format: 32MS/32WS/32MD/16WD/32XD	(Bulgaria) Stefani Stoeva	(Bulgaria) Gergana Pavlova
30 September	Bulgarian International: Dates: 3 October – 6 October; Host: Sofia, Bulgaria; Venue: Badminton Hall "Europe"; Level: Future Series; Format: 32MS/32WS/32MD/16WD/32XD	Score: 18–21, 21–15, 21–8	
30 September	Bulgarian International: Dates: 3 October – 6 October; Host: Sofia, Bulgaria; Venue: Badminton Hall "Europe"; Level: Future Series; Format: 32MS/32WS/32MD/16WD/32XD	(Portugal) Bruno Carvalho (Portugal) David Silva	(Italy) Matteo Massetti (Italy) David Salutt
30 September	Bulgarian International: Dates: 3 October – 6 October; Host: Sofia, Bulgaria; Venue: Badminton Hall "Europe"; Level: Future Series; Format: 32MS/32WS/32MD/16WD/32XD	Score: 14–21, 21–19, 21–19	
30 September	Bulgarian International: Dates: 3 October – 6 October; Host: Sofia, Bulgaria; Venue: Badminton Hall "Europe"; Level: Future Series; Format: 32MS/32WS/32MD/16WD/32XD	(Bulgaria) Gabriela Stoeva (Bulgaria) Stefani Stoeva	(Bulgaria) Tanya Ivanova (Bulgaria) Gergana Pavlova
30 September	Bulgarian International: Dates: 3 October – 6 October; Host: Sofia, Bulgaria; Venue: Badminton Hall "Europe"; Level: Future Series; Format: 32MS/32WS/32MD/16WD/32XD	Score: 21–5, 21–10	
30 September	Bulgarian International: Dates: 3 October – 6 October; Host: Sofia, Bulgaria; Venue: Badminton Hall "Europe"; Level: Future Series; Format: 32MS/32WS/32MD/16WD/32XD	(Norway) Jonas Østhassel (Norway) Julie Abusdal	(Poland) Michal Sobolewski (Poland) Joanna Podedworny
30 September	Bulgarian International: Dates: 3 October – 6 October; Host: Sofia, Bulgaria; Venue: Badminton Hall "Europe"; Level: Future Series; Format: 32MS/32WS/32MD/16WD/32XD	Score: 21–10, 21–18	
7 October	Arctic Open (Draw): Date: 8 October – 13 October; Host: Vantaa, Finland; Venue: Energia Areena; Level: Super 500; Prize: $420,000; Format: 32MS/32WS/32MD/32WD/32XD	(Chinese Taipei) Chou Tien-chen	(Indonesia) Jonatan Christie
7 October	Arctic Open (Draw): Date: 8 October – 13 October; Host: Vantaa, Finland; Venue: Energia Areena; Level: Super 500; Prize: $420,000; Format: 32MS/32WS/32MD/32WD/32XD	Score: 21–18, 21–17	
7 October	Arctic Open (Draw): Date: 8 October – 13 October; Host: Vantaa, Finland; Venue: Energia Areena; Level: Super 500; Prize: $420,000; Format: 32MS/32WS/32MD/32WD/32XD	(China) Han Yue	(Thailand) Ratchanok Intanon
7 October	Arctic Open (Draw): Date: 8 October – 13 October; Host: Vantaa, Finland; Venue: Energia Areena; Level: Super 500; Prize: $420,000; Format: 32MS/32WS/32MD/32WD/32XD	Score: 21–10, 21–13	
7 October	Arctic Open (Draw): Date: 8 October – 13 October; Host: Vantaa, Finland; Venue: Energia Areena; Level: Super 500; Prize: $420,000; Format: 32MS/32WS/32MD/32WD/32XD	(Malaysia) Goh Sze Fei (Malaysia) Nur Izzuddin	(Denmark) Kim Astrup (Denmark) Anders Skaarup Rasmussen
7 October	Arctic Open (Draw): Date: 8 October – 13 October; Host: Vantaa, Finland; Venue: Energia Areena; Level: Super 500; Prize: $420,000; Format: 32MS/32WS/32MD/32WD/32XD	Score: 15–21, 21–15, 21–19	
7 October	Arctic Open (Draw): Date: 8 October – 13 October; Host: Vantaa, Finland; Venue: Energia Areena; Level: Super 500; Prize: $420,000; Format: 32MS/32WS/32MD/32WD/32XD	(China) Liu Shengshu (China) Tan Ning	(Malaysia) Pearly Tan (Malaysia) Thinaah Muralitharan
7 October	Arctic Open (Draw): Date: 8 October – 13 October; Host: Vantaa, Finland; Venue: Energia Areena; Level: Super 500; Prize: $420,000; Format: 32MS/32WS/32MD/32WD/32XD	Score: 21–12, 21–17	
7 October	Arctic Open (Draw): Date: 8 October – 13 October; Host: Vantaa, Finland; Venue: Energia Areena; Level: Super 500; Prize: $420,000; Format: 32MS/32WS/32MD/32WD/32XD	(China) Feng Yanzhe (China) Huang Dongping	(China) Jiang Zhenbang (China) Wei Yaxin
7 October	Arctic Open (Draw): Date: 8 October – 13 October; Host: Vantaa, Finland; Venue: Energia Areena; Level: Super 500; Prize: $420,000; Format: 32MS/32WS/32MD/32WD/32XD	Score: 21–18, 6–21, 21–15	
7 October	Bendigo International: Dates: 9 October – 13 October; Host: Bendigo, Victoria, Australia; Venue: Red Energy Arena; Level: International Challenge; Prize: $15,000; Format: 64MS/32WS/32MD/32WD/32XD	(Japan) Shogo Ogawa	(Japan) Keisuke Fujiwara
7 October	Bendigo International: Dates: 9 October – 13 October; Host: Bendigo, Victoria, Australia; Venue: Red Energy Arena; Level: International Challenge; Prize: $15,000; Format: 64MS/32WS/32MD/32WD/32XD	Score: 21–18, 21–9	
7 October	Bendigo International: Dates: 9 October – 13 October; Host: Bendigo, Victoria, Australia; Venue: Red Energy Arena; Level: International Challenge; Prize: $15,000; Format: 64MS/32WS/32MD/32WD/32XD	(India) Tanya Hemanth	(Chinese Taipei) Tung Ciou-tong
7 October	Bendigo International: Dates: 9 October – 13 October; Host: Bendigo, Victoria, Australia; Venue: Red Energy Arena; Level: International Challenge; Prize: $15,000; Format: 64MS/32WS/32MD/32WD/32XD	Score: 21–17, 21–17	
7 October	Bendigo International: Dates: 9 October – 13 October; Host: Bendigo, Victoria, Australia; Venue: Red Energy Arena; Level: International Challenge; Prize: $15,000; Format: 64MS/32WS/32MD/32WD/32XD	(Chinese Taipei) Chen Cheng-kuan (Chinese Taipei) Po Li-wei	(India) Hariharan Amsakarunan (India) Ruban Kumar Rethinasabapathi
7 October	Bendigo International: Dates: 9 October – 13 October; Host: Bendigo, Victoria, Australia; Venue: Red Energy Arena; Level: International Challenge; Prize: $15,000; Format: 64MS/32WS/32MD/32WD/32XD	Score: 21–17, 21–14	
7 October	Bendigo International: Dates: 9 October – 13 October; Host: Bendigo, Victoria, Australia; Venue: Red Energy Arena; Level: International Challenge; Prize: $15,000; Format: 64MS/32WS/32MD/32WD/32XD	(Chinese Taipei) Hsu Yin-hui (Chinese Taipei) Lin Jhih-yun	(Chinese Taipei) Lee Chih-chen (Chinese Taipei) Lin Yen-yu
7 October	Bendigo International: Dates: 9 October – 13 October; Host: Bendigo, Victoria, Australia; Venue: Red Energy Arena; Level: International Challenge; Prize: $15,000; Format: 64MS/32WS/32MD/32WD/32XD	Score: 21–15, 21–16	
7 October	Bendigo International: Dates: 9 October – 13 October; Host: Bendigo, Victoria, Australia; Venue: Red Energy Arena; Level: International Challenge; Prize: $15,000; Format: 64MS/32WS/32MD/32WD/32XD	(Singapore) Wesley Koh (Singapore) Jin Yujia	(Chinese Taipei) Chen Cheng-kuan (Chinese Taipei) Lee Chih-chen
7 October	Bendigo International: Dates: 9 October – 13 October; Host: Bendigo, Victoria, Australia; Venue: Red Energy Arena; Level: International Challenge; Prize: $15,000; Format: 64MS/32WS/32MD/32WD/32XD	Score: 21–13, 19–21, 22–20	
7 October	Egypt International: Dates: 9 October – 13 October; Host: Cairo, Egypt; Venue: Cairo Stadium Indoor Halls Complex; Level: International Series; Prize: $10,000; Format: 32MS/32WS/32MD/32WD/32XD	(India) Raghu Mariswamy	(Spain) Álvaro Vázquez
7 October	Egypt International: Dates: 9 October – 13 October; Host: Cairo, Egypt; Venue: Cairo Stadium Indoor Halls Complex; Level: International Series; Prize: $10,000; Format: 32MS/32WS/32MD/32WD/32XD	Score: 24–22, 17–21, 21–16	
7 October	Egypt International: Dates: 9 October – 13 October; Host: Cairo, Egypt; Venue: Cairo Stadium Indoor Halls Complex; Level: International Series; Prize: $10,000; Format: 32MS/32WS/32MD/32WD/32XD	(Bulgaria) Stefani Stoeva	(Italy) Yasmine Hamza
7 October	Egypt International: Dates: 9 October – 13 October; Host: Cairo, Egypt; Venue: Cairo Stadium Indoor Halls Complex; Level: International Series; Prize: $10,000; Format: 32MS/32WS/32MD/32WD/32XD	Score: 21–10, 22–20	
7 October	Egypt International: Dates: 9 October – 13 October; Host: Cairo, Egypt; Venue: Cairo Stadium Indoor Halls Complex; Level: International Series; Prize: $10,000; Format: 32MS/32WS/32MD/32WD/32XD	(Thailand) Kittisak Namdash (Thailand) Samatcha Tovannakasem	(Algeria) Koceila Mammeri (Algeria) Youcef Sabri Medel
7 October	Egypt International: Dates: 9 October – 13 October; Host: Cairo, Egypt; Venue: Cairo Stadium Indoor Halls Complex; Level: International Series; Prize: $10,000; Format: 32MS/32WS/32MD/32WD/32XD	Score: 13–21, 21–18, 21–13	
7 October	Egypt International: Dates: 9 October – 13 October; Host: Cairo, Egypt; Venue: Cairo Stadium Indoor Halls Complex; Level: International Series; Prize: $10,000; Format: 32MS/32WS/32MD/32WD/32XD	(Switzerland) Lucie Amiguet (Switzerland) Caroline Racloz	(Mauritius) Lorna Bodha (Mauritius) Kobita Dookhee
7 October	Egypt International: Dates: 9 October – 13 October; Host: Cairo, Egypt; Venue: Cairo Stadium Indoor Halls Complex; Level: International Series; Prize: $10,000; Format: 32MS/32WS/32MD/32WD/32XD	Score: 21–8, 21–13	
7 October	Egypt International: Dates: 9 October – 13 October; Host: Cairo, Egypt; Venue: Cairo Stadium Indoor Halls Complex; Level: International Series; Prize: $10,000; Format: 32MS/32WS/32MD/32WD/32XD	(Algeria) Koceila Mammeri (Algeria) Tanina Mammeri	(India) Bokka Navaneeth (India) Ritika Thaker
7 October	Egypt International: Dates: 9 October – 13 October; Host: Cairo, Egypt; Venue: Cairo Stadium Indoor Halls Complex; Level: International Series; Prize: $10,000; Format: 32MS/32WS/32MD/32WD/32XD	Score: 23–21, 21–17	
7 October	Türkiye International: Dates: 10 October – 13 October; Host: Istanbul, Turkey; Venue: Başakşehir Gençlik ve Spor İlçe Müdürlüğü Tesisleri; Level: International Challenge; Prize: $15,000; Format: 32MS/32WS/32MD/32WD/32XD	(Finland) Kalle Koljonen	(India) Aryamann Tandon
7 October	Türkiye International: Dates: 10 October – 13 October; Host: Istanbul, Turkey; Venue: Başakşehir Gençlik ve Spor İlçe Müdürlüğü Tesisleri; Level: International Challenge; Prize: $15,000; Format: 32MS/32WS/32MD/32WD/32XD	Score: 21–16, 21–18	
7 October	Türkiye International: Dates: 10 October – 13 October; Host: Istanbul, Turkey; Venue: Başakşehir Gençlik ve Spor İlçe Müdürlüğü Tesisleri; Level: International Challenge; Prize: $15,000; Format: 32MS/32WS/32MD/32WD/32XD	(Azerbaijan) Keisha Fatimah Azzahra	(Denmark) Amalie Schulz
7 October	Türkiye International: Dates: 10 October – 13 October; Host: Istanbul, Turkey; Venue: Başakşehir Gençlik ve Spor İlçe Müdürlüğü Tesisleri; Level: International Challenge; Prize: $15,000; Format: 32MS/32WS/32MD/32WD/32XD	Score: 21–11, 21–9	
7 October	Türkiye International: Dates: 10 October – 13 October; Host: Istanbul, Turkey; Venue: Başakşehir Gençlik ve Spor İlçe Müdürlüğü Tesisleri; Level: International Challenge; Prize: $15,000; Format: 32MS/32WS/32MD/32WD/32XD	(France) Julien Maio (France) William Villeger	(France) Éloi Adam (France) Léo Rossi
7 October	Türkiye International: Dates: 10 October – 13 October; Host: Istanbul, Turkey; Venue: Başakşehir Gençlik ve Spor İlçe Müdürlüğü Tesisleri; Level: International Challenge; Prize: $15,000; Format: 32MS/32WS/32MD/32WD/32XD	Score: 21–15, 17–21, 21–13	
7 October	Türkiye International: Dates: 10 October – 13 October; Host: Istanbul, Turkey; Venue: Başakşehir Gençlik ve Spor İlçe Müdürlüğü Tesisleri; Level: International Challenge; Prize: $15,000; Format: 32MS/32WS/32MD/32WD/32XD	(Spain) Paula López (Spain) Lucía Rodríguez	(Ukraine) Polina Buhrova (Ukraine) Yevheniia Kantemyr
7 October	Türkiye International: Dates: 10 October – 13 October; Host: Istanbul, Turkey; Venue: Başakşehir Gençlik ve Spor İlçe Müdürlüğü Tesisleri; Level: International Challenge; Prize: $15,000; Format: 32MS/32WS/32MD/32WD/32XD	Score: Walkover	
7 October	Türkiye International: Dates: 10 October – 13 October; Host: Istanbul, Turkey; Venue: Başakşehir Gençlik ve Spor İlçe Müdürlüğü Tesisleri; Level: International Challenge; Prize: $15,000; Format: 32MS/32WS/32MD/32WD/32XD	(France) Julien Maio (France) Léa Palermo	(India) Rohan Kapoor (India) Gadde Ruthvika Shivani
7 October	Türkiye International: Dates: 10 October – 13 October; Host: Istanbul, Turkey; Venue: Başakşehir Gençlik ve Spor İlçe Müdürlüğü Tesisleri; Level: International Challenge; Prize: $15,000; Format: 32MS/32WS/32MD/32WD/32XD	Score: 21–15, 21–13	
14 October	Denmark Open (Draw): Date: 15 October – 20 October; Host: Odense, Denmark; Venue: Jyske Bank Arena; Level: Super 750; Prize: $850,000; Format: 32MS/32WS/32MD/32WD/32XD	(Denmark) Anders Antonsen	(Japan) Koki Watanabe
14 October	Denmark Open (Draw): Date: 15 October – 20 October; Host: Odense, Denmark; Venue: Jyske Bank Arena; Level: Super 750; Prize: $850,000; Format: 32MS/32WS/32MD/32WD/32XD	Score: 21–15, 21–16	
14 October	Denmark Open (Draw): Date: 15 October – 20 October; Host: Odense, Denmark; Venue: Jyske Bank Arena; Level: Super 750; Prize: $850,000; Format: 32MS/32WS/32MD/32WD/32XD	(China) Wang Zhiyi	(South Korea) An Se-young
14 October	Denmark Open (Draw): Date: 15 October – 20 October; Host: Odense, Denmark; Venue: Jyske Bank Arena; Level: Super 750; Prize: $850,000; Format: 32MS/32WS/32MD/32WD/32XD	Score: 21–10, 21–12	
14 October	Denmark Open (Draw): Date: 15 October – 20 October; Host: Odense, Denmark; Venue: Jyske Bank Arena; Level: Super 750; Prize: $850,000; Format: 32MS/32WS/32MD/32WD/32XD	(China) Liang Weikeng (China) Wang Chang	(Denmark) Kim Astrup (Denmark) Anders Skaarup Rasmussen
14 October	Denmark Open (Draw): Date: 15 October – 20 October; Host: Odense, Denmark; Venue: Jyske Bank Arena; Level: Super 750; Prize: $850,000; Format: 32MS/32WS/32MD/32WD/32XD	Score: 21–18, 21–17	
14 October	Denmark Open (Draw): Date: 15 October – 20 October; Host: Odense, Denmark; Venue: Jyske Bank Arena; Level: Super 750; Prize: $850,000; Format: 32MS/32WS/32MD/32WD/32XD	(Japan) Rin Iwanaga (Japan) Kie Nakanishi	(China) Liu Shengshu (China) Tan Ning
14 October	Denmark Open (Draw): Date: 15 October – 20 October; Host: Odense, Denmark; Venue: Jyske Bank Arena; Level: Super 750; Prize: $850,000; Format: 32MS/32WS/32MD/32WD/32XD	Score: 21–18, 21–14	
14 October	Denmark Open (Draw): Date: 15 October – 20 October; Host: Odense, Denmark; Venue: Jyske Bank Arena; Level: Super 750; Prize: $850,000; Format: 32MS/32WS/32MD/32WD/32XD	(China) Feng Yanzhe (China) Huang Dongping	(China) Jiang Zhenbang (China) Wei Yaxin
14 October	Denmark Open (Draw): Date: 15 October – 20 October; Host: Odense, Denmark; Venue: Jyske Bank Arena; Level: Super 750; Prize: $850,000; Format: 32MS/32WS/32MD/32WD/32XD	Score: 15–21, 21–18, 21–17	
14 October	Malaysia Super 100 (Draw): Date: 15 October – 20 October; Host: Kuala Lumpur, Malaysia; Venue: Stadium Juara; Level: Super 100; Prize: $100,000; Format: 48MS/32WS/32MD/32WD/32XD	(Chinese Taipei) Chi Yu-jen	(Singapore) Jason Teh
14 October	Malaysia Super 100 (Draw): Date: 15 October – 20 October; Host: Kuala Lumpur, Malaysia; Venue: Stadium Juara; Level: Super 100; Prize: $100,000; Format: 48MS/32WS/32MD/32WD/32XD	Score: 21–12, 21–23, 21–15	
14 October	Malaysia Super 100 (Draw): Date: 15 October – 20 October; Host: Kuala Lumpur, Malaysia; Venue: Stadium Juara; Level: Super 100; Prize: $100,000; Format: 48MS/32WS/32MD/32WD/32XD	(Japan) Kaoru Sugiyama	(Japan) Manami Suizu
14 October	Malaysia Super 100 (Draw): Date: 15 October – 20 October; Host: Kuala Lumpur, Malaysia; Venue: Stadium Juara; Level: Super 100; Prize: $100,000; Format: 48MS/32WS/32MD/32WD/32XD	Score: 21–18, 21–14	
14 October	Malaysia Super 100 (Draw): Date: 15 October – 20 October; Host: Kuala Lumpur, Malaysia; Venue: Stadium Juara; Level: Super 100; Prize: $100,000; Format: 48MS/32WS/32MD/32WD/32XD	(Malaysia) Low Hang Yee (Malaysia) Ng Eng Cheong	(United States) Chen Zhi-yi (United States) Presley Smith
14 October	Malaysia Super 100 (Draw): Date: 15 October – 20 October; Host: Kuala Lumpur, Malaysia; Venue: Stadium Juara; Level: Super 100; Prize: $100,000; Format: 48MS/32WS/32MD/32WD/32XD	Score: 19–21, 21–15, 21–12	
14 October	Malaysia Super 100 (Draw): Date: 15 October – 20 October; Host: Kuala Lumpur, Malaysia; Venue: Stadium Juara; Level: Super 100; Prize: $100,000; Format: 48MS/32WS/32MD/32WD/32XD	(Malaysia) Go Pei Kee (Malaysia) Teoh Mei Xing	(Chinese Taipei) Nicole Gonzales Chan (Chinese Taipei) Yang Chu-yun
14 October	Malaysia Super 100 (Draw): Date: 15 October – 20 October; Host: Kuala Lumpur, Malaysia; Venue: Stadium Juara; Level: Super 100; Prize: $100,000; Format: 48MS/32WS/32MD/32WD/32XD	Score: 22–20, 21–11	
14 October	Malaysia Super 100 (Draw): Date: 15 October – 20 October; Host: Kuala Lumpur, Malaysia; Venue: Stadium Juara; Level: Super 100; Prize: $100,000; Format: 48MS/32WS/32MD/32WD/32XD	(Chinese Taipei) Ye Hong-wei (Chinese Taipei) Nicole Gonzales Chan	(Japan) Yuichi Shimogami (Japan) Sayaka Hobara
14 October	Malaysia Super 100 (Draw): Date: 15 October – 20 October; Host: Kuala Lumpur, Malaysia; Venue: Stadium Juara; Level: Super 100; Prize: $100,000; Format: 48MS/32WS/32MD/32WD/32XD	Score: 21–19, 12–21, 22–20	
14 October	Sydney International: Dates: 16 October – 20 October; Host: Lidcombe, New South Wales, Australia; Venue: Roketto Badminton Centre; Level: International Challenge; Prize: $15,000; Format: 64MS/32WS/32MD/32WD/32XD	(Chinese Taipei) Huang Ping-hsien	(Japan) Shogo Ogawa
14 October	Sydney International: Dates: 16 October – 20 October; Host: Lidcombe, New South Wales, Australia; Venue: Roketto Badminton Centre; Level: International Challenge; Prize: $15,000; Format: 64MS/32WS/32MD/32WD/32XD	Score: 21–14, 20–22, 21–14	
14 October	Sydney International: Dates: 16 October – 20 October; Host: Lidcombe, New South Wales, Australia; Venue: Roketto Badminton Centre; Level: International Challenge; Prize: $15,000; Format: 64MS/32WS/32MD/32WD/32XD	(Chinese Taipei) Tung Ciou-tong	(Chinese Taipei) Huang Ching-ping
14 October	Sydney International: Dates: 16 October – 20 October; Host: Lidcombe, New South Wales, Australia; Venue: Roketto Badminton Centre; Level: International Challenge; Prize: $15,000; Format: 64MS/32WS/32MD/32WD/32XD	Score: 16–21, 21–19, 21–14	
14 October	Sydney International: Dates: 16 October – 20 October; Host: Lidcombe, New South Wales, Australia; Venue: Roketto Badminton Centre; Level: International Challenge; Prize: $15,000; Format: 64MS/32WS/32MD/32WD/32XD	(Japan) Hiroki Midorikawa (Japan) Kyohei Yamashita	(Chinese Taipei) Lai Po-yu (Chinese Taipei) Tsai Fu-cheng
14 October	Sydney International: Dates: 16 October – 20 October; Host: Lidcombe, New South Wales, Australia; Venue: Roketto Badminton Centre; Level: International Challenge; Prize: $15,000; Format: 64MS/32WS/32MD/32WD/32XD	Score: 21–14, 21–16	
14 October	Sydney International: Dates: 16 October – 20 October; Host: Lidcombe, New South Wales, Australia; Venue: Roketto Badminton Centre; Level: International Challenge; Prize: $15,000; Format: 64MS/32WS/32MD/32WD/32XD	(Chinese Taipei) Hsu Yin-hui (Chinese Taipei) Lin Jhih-yun	(Chinese Taipei) Lee Chih-chen (Chinese Taipei) Lin Yen-yu
14 October	Sydney International: Dates: 16 October – 20 October; Host: Lidcombe, New South Wales, Australia; Venue: Roketto Badminton Centre; Level: International Challenge; Prize: $15,000; Format: 64MS/32WS/32MD/32WD/32XD	Score: 21–12, 21–12	
14 October	Sydney International: Dates: 16 October – 20 October; Host: Lidcombe, New South Wales, Australia; Venue: Roketto Badminton Centre; Level: International Challenge; Prize: $15,000; Format: 64MS/32WS/32MD/32WD/32XD	(Chinese Taipei) Chen Cheng-kuan (Chinese Taipei) Hsu Yin-hui	(Australia) Andika Ramadiansyah (Australia) Nozomi Shimizu
14 October	Sydney International: Dates: 16 October – 20 October; Host: Lidcombe, New South Wales, Australia; Venue: Roketto Badminton Centre; Level: International Challenge; Prize: $15,000; Format: 64MS/32WS/32MD/32WD/32XD	Score: 26–24, 11–21, 21–11	
14 October	Perú International: Dates: 16 October – 20 October; Host: Lima, Perú; Venue: Villa Deportiva Nacional; Level: International Series; Prize: $5,000; Format: 32MS/32WS/32MD/16WD/32XD	(Israel) Misha Zilberman	(Brazil) Jonathan Matias
14 October	Perú International: Dates: 16 October – 20 October; Host: Lima, Perú; Venue: Villa Deportiva Nacional; Level: International Series; Prize: $5,000; Format: 32MS/32WS/32MD/16WD/32XD	Score: 21–19, 21–16	
14 October	Perú International: Dates: 16 October – 20 October; Host: Lima, Perú; Venue: Villa Deportiva Nacional; Level: International Series; Prize: $5,000; Format: 32MS/32WS/32MD/16WD/32XD	(Brazil) Juliana Viana Vieira	(Canada) Chloe Hoang
14 October	Perú International: Dates: 16 October – 20 October; Host: Lima, Perú; Venue: Villa Deportiva Nacional; Level: International Series; Prize: $5,000; Format: 32MS/32WS/32MD/16WD/32XD	Score: 21–16, 21–12	
14 October	Perú International: Dates: 16 October – 20 October; Host: Lima, Perú; Venue: Villa Deportiva Nacional; Level: International Series; Prize: $5,000; Format: 32MS/32WS/32MD/16WD/32XD	(Brazil) Izak Batalha (Brazil) Matheus Voigt	(Brazil) Fabrício Farias (Brazil) Davi Silva
14 October	Perú International: Dates: 16 October – 20 October; Host: Lima, Perú; Venue: Villa Deportiva Nacional; Level: International Series; Prize: $5,000; Format: 32MS/32WS/32MD/16WD/32XD	Score: 21–16, 21–17	
14 October	Perú International: Dates: 16 October – 20 October; Host: Lima, Perú; Venue: Villa Deportiva Nacional; Level: International Series; Prize: $5,000; Format: 32MS/32WS/32MD/16WD/32XD	(Brazil) Jaqueline Lima (Brazil) Sâmia Lima	(Guatemala) Diana Corleto (Guatemala) Nikté Sotomayor
14 October	Perú International: Dates: 16 October – 20 October; Host: Lima, Perú; Venue: Villa Deportiva Nacional; Level: International Series; Prize: $5,000; Format: 32MS/32WS/32MD/16WD/32XD	Score: 21–11, 21–17	
14 October	Perú International: Dates: 16 October – 20 October; Host: Lima, Perú; Venue: Villa Deportiva Nacional; Level: International Series; Prize: $5,000; Format: 32MS/32WS/32MD/16WD/32XD	(Mexico) Luis Montoya (Mexico) Miriam Rodríguez	(Brazil) Fabrício Farias (Brazil) Jaqueline Lima
14 October	Perú International: Dates: 16 October – 20 October; Host: Lima, Perú; Venue: Villa Deportiva Nacional; Level: International Series; Prize: $5,000; Format: 32MS/32WS/32MD/16WD/32XD	Score: 21–15, 17–21, 21–18	
14 October	Algeria International: Dates: 17 October – 20 October; Host: Algiers, Algeria; Venue: Salle Omnisport Mokhtar Aribi El Biar; Level: International Series; Prize: $5,000; Format: 32MS/32WS/32MD/32WD/32XD	(Croatia) Aria Dinata	(Denmark) Søren Hald
14 October	Algeria International: Dates: 17 October – 20 October; Host: Algiers, Algeria; Venue: Salle Omnisport Mokhtar Aribi El Biar; Level: International Series; Prize: $5,000; Format: 32MS/32WS/32MD/32WD/32XD	Score: 21–17, 21–9	
14 October	Algeria International: Dates: 17 October – 20 October; Host: Algiers, Algeria; Venue: Salle Omnisport Mokhtar Aribi El Biar; Level: International Series; Prize: $5,000; Format: 32MS/32WS/32MD/32WD/32XD	(Italy) Yasmine Hamza	(Malaysia) Loh Zhi Wei
14 October	Algeria International: Dates: 17 October – 20 October; Host: Algiers, Algeria; Venue: Salle Omnisport Mokhtar Aribi El Biar; Level: International Series; Prize: $5,000; Format: 32MS/32WS/32MD/32WD/32XD	Score: 22–20, 21–13	
14 October	Algeria International: Dates: 17 October – 20 October; Host: Algiers, Algeria; Venue: Salle Omnisport Mokhtar Aribi El Biar; Level: International Series; Prize: $5,000; Format: 32MS/32WS/32MD/32WD/32XD	(Algeria) Koceila Mammeri (Algeria) Youcef Sabri Medel	(India) Nithin H. V. (India) Venkata Harsha Vardhan Rayudu Veeramreddy
14 October	Algeria International: Dates: 17 October – 20 October; Host: Algiers, Algeria; Venue: Salle Omnisport Mokhtar Aribi El Biar; Level: International Series; Prize: $5,000; Format: 32MS/32WS/32MD/32WD/32XD	Score: 11–21, 21–9, 23–21	
14 October	Algeria International: Dates: 17 October – 20 October; Host: Algiers, Algeria; Venue: Salle Omnisport Mokhtar Aribi El Biar; Level: International Series; Prize: $5,000; Format: 32MS/32WS/32MD/32WD/32XD	(France) Tea Margueritte (France) Flavie Vallet	(Switzerland) Jorina Jann (Switzerland) Leila Zarrouk
14 October	Algeria International: Dates: 17 October – 20 October; Host: Algiers, Algeria; Venue: Salle Omnisport Mokhtar Aribi El Biar; Level: International Series; Prize: $5,000; Format: 32MS/32WS/32MD/32WD/32XD	Score: 21–13, 21–14	
14 October	Algeria International: Dates: 17 October – 20 October; Host: Algiers, Algeria; Venue: Salle Omnisport Mokhtar Aribi El Biar; Level: International Series; Prize: $5,000; Format: 32MS/32WS/32MD/32WD/32XD	(Algeria) Koceila Mammeri (Algeria) Tanina Mammeri	(Portugal) Bruno Carvalho (Portugal) Mariana Paiva
14 October	Algeria International: Dates: 17 October – 20 October; Host: Algiers, Algeria; Venue: Salle Omnisport Mokhtar Aribi El Biar; Level: International Series; Prize: $5,000; Format: 32MS/32WS/32MD/32WD/32XD	Score: 21–17, 21–11	
14 October	Czech Open: Dates: 17 October – 20 October; Host: Prague, Czech Republic; Venue: Sports hall Řepy; Level: International Series; Prize: $5,000; Format: 32MS/32WS/24MD/24WD/24XD	(Germany) Matthias Kicklitz	(Denmark) Jakob Houe
14 October	Czech Open: Dates: 17 October – 20 October; Host: Prague, Czech Republic; Venue: Sports hall Řepy; Level: International Series; Prize: $5,000; Format: 32MS/32WS/24MD/24WD/24XD	Score: 15–21, 21–19, 21–19	
14 October	Czech Open: Dates: 17 October – 20 October; Host: Prague, Czech Republic; Venue: Sports hall Řepy; Level: International Series; Prize: $5,000; Format: 32MS/32WS/24MD/24WD/24XD	(Denmark) Frederikke Lund	(Hungary) Monika Szoke
14 October	Czech Open: Dates: 17 October – 20 October; Host: Prague, Czech Republic; Venue: Sports hall Řepy; Level: International Series; Prize: $5,000; Format: 32MS/32WS/24MD/24WD/24XD	Score: 21–19, 21–18	
14 October	Czech Open: Dates: 17 October – 20 October; Host: Prague, Czech Republic; Venue: Sports hall Řepy; Level: International Series; Prize: $5,000; Format: 32MS/32WS/24MD/24WD/24XD	(Czech Republic) Jiří Král (Czech Republic) Ondřej Král	(Germany) Jonathan Dresp (Germany) Aaron Sonnenschein
14 October	Czech Open: Dates: 17 October – 20 October; Host: Prague, Czech Republic; Venue: Sports hall Řepy; Level: International Series; Prize: $5,000; Format: 32MS/32WS/24MD/24WD/24XD	Score: 21–18, 21–19	
14 October	Czech Open: Dates: 17 October – 20 October; Host: Prague, Czech Republic; Venue: Sports hall Řepy; Level: International Series; Prize: $5,000; Format: 32MS/32WS/24MD/24WD/24XD	(Poland) Paulina Hankiewicz (Poland) Kornelia Marczak	(France) Sharone Bauer (France) Emilie Vercelot
14 October	Czech Open: Dates: 17 October – 20 October; Host: Prague, Czech Republic; Venue: Sports hall Řepy; Level: International Series; Prize: $5,000; Format: 32MS/32WS/24MD/24WD/24XD	Score: 21–19, 24–22	
14 October	Czech Open: Dates: 17 October – 20 October; Host: Prague, Czech Republic; Venue: Sports hall Řepy; Level: International Series; Prize: $5,000; Format: 32MS/32WS/24MD/24WD/24XD	(Denmark) Kristoffer Kolding (Denmark) Mette Werge	(Germany) Malik Bourakkadi (Germany) Leona Michalski
14 October	Czech Open: Dates: 17 October – 20 October; Host: Prague, Czech Republic; Venue: Sports hall Řepy; Level: International Series; Prize: $5,000; Format: 32MS/32WS/24MD/24WD/24XD	Score: 21–14, 19–21, 21–16	
21 October	Indonesia International (Surabaya): Dates: 22 October – 27 October; Host: Surabaya, Indonesia; Venue: Jatim International Expo Convention Exhibition; Level: International Challenge; Prize: $20,000; Format: 64MS/32WS/32MD/32WD/32XD	(Japan) Koo Takahashi	(Japan) Riku Hatano
21 October	Indonesia International (Surabaya): Dates: 22 October – 27 October; Host: Surabaya, Indonesia; Venue: Jatim International Expo Convention Exhibition; Level: International Challenge; Prize: $20,000; Format: 64MS/32WS/32MD/32WD/32XD	Score: 21–18, 21–11	
21 October	Indonesia International (Surabaya): Dates: 22 October – 27 October; Host: Surabaya, Indonesia; Venue: Jatim International Expo Convention Exhibition; Level: International Challenge; Prize: $20,000; Format: 64MS/32WS/32MD/32WD/32XD	(Thailand) Yataweemin Ketklieng	(Indonesia) Mutiara Ayu Puspitasari
21 October	Indonesia International (Surabaya): Dates: 22 October – 27 October; Host: Surabaya, Indonesia; Venue: Jatim International Expo Convention Exhibition; Level: International Challenge; Prize: $20,000; Format: 64MS/32WS/32MD/32WD/32XD	Score: 18–21, 21–12, 21–16	
21 October	Indonesia International (Surabaya): Dates: 22 October – 27 October; Host: Surabaya, Indonesia; Venue: Jatim International Expo Convention Exhibition; Level: International Challenge; Prize: $20,000; Format: 64MS/32WS/32MD/32WD/32XD	(Indonesia) Rahmat Hidayat (Indonesia) Yeremia Rambitan	(Chinese Taipei) Lu Ching-yao (Chinese Taipei) Wu Guan-xun
21 October	Indonesia International (Surabaya): Dates: 22 October – 27 October; Host: Surabaya, Indonesia; Venue: Jatim International Expo Convention Exhibition; Level: International Challenge; Prize: $20,000; Format: 64MS/32WS/32MD/32WD/32XD	Score: 23–21, 23–21	
21 October	Indonesia International (Surabaya): Dates: 22 October – 27 October; Host: Surabaya, Indonesia; Venue: Jatim International Expo Convention Exhibition; Level: International Challenge; Prize: $20,000; Format: 64MS/32WS/32MD/32WD/32XD	(Indonesia) Lanny Tria Mayasari (Indonesia) Siti Fadia Silva Ramadhanti	(Chinese Taipei) Hsieh Pei-shan (Chinese Taipei) Hung En-tzu
21 October	Indonesia International (Surabaya): Dates: 22 October – 27 October; Host: Surabaya, Indonesia; Venue: Jatim International Expo Convention Exhibition; Level: International Challenge; Prize: $20,000; Format: 64MS/32WS/32MD/32WD/32XD	Score: 21–9, 21–16	
21 October	Indonesia International (Surabaya): Dates: 22 October – 27 October; Host: Surabaya, Indonesia; Venue: Jatim International Expo Convention Exhibition; Level: International Challenge; Prize: $20,000; Format: 64MS/32WS/32MD/32WD/32XD	(Indonesia) Jafar Hidayatullah (Indonesia) Felisha Pasaribu	(Indonesia) Amri Syahnawi (Indonesia) Nita Violina Marwah
21 October	Indonesia International (Surabaya): Dates: 22 October – 27 October; Host: Surabaya, Indonesia; Venue: Jatim International Expo Convention Exhibition; Level: International Challenge; Prize: $20,000; Format: 64MS/32WS/32MD/32WD/32XD	Score: 21–13, 21–15	
21 October	Venezuela International (cancelled): Dates: 22 October – 26 October; Host: Maracay, Venezuela; Venue: Polideportivo Las Delicias; Level: International Series; Prize: $5,000; Format: –		
21 October	Venezuela International (cancelled): Dates: 22 October – 26 October; Host: Maracay, Venezuela; Venue: Polideportivo Las Delicias; Level: International Series; Prize: $5,000; Format: –	Score:	
21 October	Venezuela International (cancelled): Dates: 22 October – 26 October; Host: Maracay, Venezuela; Venue: Polideportivo Las Delicias; Level: International Series; Prize: $5,000; Format: –	Score:	
21 October	Venezuela International (cancelled): Dates: 22 October – 26 October; Host: Maracay, Venezuela; Venue: Polideportivo Las Delicias; Level: International Series; Prize: $5,000; Format: –	Score:	
21 October	Venezuela International (cancelled): Dates: 22 October – 26 October; Host: Maracay, Venezuela; Venue: Polideportivo Las Delicias; Level: International Series; Prize: $5,000; Format: –	Score:	
21 October	Venezuela International (cancelled): Dates: 22 October – 26 October; Host: Maracay, Venezuela; Venue: Polideportivo Las Delicias; Level: International Series; Prize: $5,000; Format: –	Score:	
21 October	North Harbour International: Dates: 23 October – 26 October; Host: Auckland, New Zealand; Venue: Harcourts Cooper & Co Badminton North Harbour Centre; Level: International Challenge; Prize: $15,000; Format: 64MS/32WS/32MD/32WD/32XD	(Australia) Karono	(Chinese Taipei) Lu Chia-hung
21 October	North Harbour International: Dates: 23 October – 26 October; Host: Auckland, New Zealand; Venue: Harcourts Cooper & Co Badminton North Harbour Centre; Level: International Challenge; Prize: $15,000; Format: 64MS/32WS/32MD/32WD/32XD	Score: 22–20, 21–11	
21 October	North Harbour International: Dates: 23 October – 26 October; Host: Auckland, New Zealand; Venue: Harcourts Cooper & Co Badminton North Harbour Centre; Level: International Challenge; Prize: $15,000; Format: 64MS/32WS/32MD/32WD/32XD	(Chinese Taipei) Tsai Hsin-pei	(Singapore) Jaslyn Hooi
21 October	North Harbour International: Dates: 23 October – 26 October; Host: Auckland, New Zealand; Venue: Harcourts Cooper & Co Badminton North Harbour Centre; Level: International Challenge; Prize: $15,000; Format: 64MS/32WS/32MD/32WD/32XD	Score: 21–18, 21–13	
21 October	North Harbour International: Dates: 23 October – 26 October; Host: Auckland, New Zealand; Venue: Harcourts Cooper & Co Badminton North Harbour Centre; Level: International Challenge; Prize: $15,000; Format: 64MS/32WS/32MD/32WD/32XD	(Japan) Hiroki Midorikawa (Japan) Kyohei Yamashita	(Chinese Taipei) Lai Po-yu (Chinese Taipei) Tsai Fu-cheng
21 October	North Harbour International: Dates: 23 October – 26 October; Host: Auckland, New Zealand; Venue: Harcourts Cooper & Co Badminton North Harbour Centre; Level: International Challenge; Prize: $15,000; Format: 64MS/32WS/32MD/32WD/32XD	Score: 16–21, 21–14, 21–14	
21 October	North Harbour International: Dates: 23 October – 26 October; Host: Auckland, New Zealand; Venue: Harcourts Cooper & Co Badminton North Harbour Centre; Level: International Challenge; Prize: $15,000; Format: 64MS/32WS/32MD/32WD/32XD	(Chinese Taipei) Lee Chih-chen (Chinese Taipei) Lin Yen-yu	(Chinese Taipei) Chen Su-yu (Chinese Taipei) Hsieh Yi-en
21 October	North Harbour International: Dates: 23 October – 26 October; Host: Auckland, New Zealand; Venue: Harcourts Cooper & Co Badminton North Harbour Centre; Level: International Challenge; Prize: $15,000; Format: 64MS/32WS/32MD/32WD/32XD	Score: 21–12, 21–14	
21 October	North Harbour International: Dates: 23 October – 26 October; Host: Auckland, New Zealand; Venue: Harcourts Cooper & Co Badminton North Harbour Centre; Level: International Challenge; Prize: $15,000; Format: 64MS/32WS/32MD/32WD/32XD	(Chinese Taipei) Chen Cheng-kuan (Chinese Taipei) Lee Chih-chen	(New Zealand) Edward Lau (New Zealand) Shaunna Li
21 October	North Harbour International: Dates: 23 October – 26 October; Host: Auckland, New Zealand; Venue: Harcourts Cooper & Co Badminton North Harbour Centre; Level: International Challenge; Prize: $15,000; Format: 64MS/32WS/32MD/32WD/32XD	Score: 21–3, 21–10	
21 October	Dutch Open: Dates: 23 October – 27 October; Host: 's-Hertogenbosch, Netherlands; Venue: Maaspoort; Level: International Challenge; Prize: $15,000; Format: 32MS/32WS/32MD/32WD/32XD	(Denmark) Mads Christophersen	(India) Ayush Shetty
21 October	Dutch Open: Dates: 23 October – 27 October; Host: 's-Hertogenbosch, Netherlands; Venue: Maaspoort; Level: International Challenge; Prize: $15,000; Format: 32MS/32WS/32MD/32WD/32XD	Score: 21–10, 21–9	
21 October	Dutch Open: Dates: 23 October – 27 October; Host: 's-Hertogenbosch, Netherlands; Venue: Maaspoort; Level: International Challenge; Prize: $15,000; Format: 32MS/32WS/32MD/32WD/32XD	(Malaysia) Kisona Selvaduray	(Azerbaijan) Keisha Fatimah Azzahra
21 October	Dutch Open: Dates: 23 October – 27 October; Host: 's-Hertogenbosch, Netherlands; Venue: Maaspoort; Level: International Challenge; Prize: $15,000; Format: 32MS/32WS/32MD/32WD/32XD	Score: 21–14, 21–16	
21 October	Dutch Open: Dates: 23 October – 27 October; Host: 's-Hertogenbosch, Netherlands; Venue: Maaspoort; Level: International Challenge; Prize: $15,000; Format: 32MS/32WS/32MD/32WD/32XD	(Denmark) Rasmus Espersen (Denmark) Christian Faust Kjær	(France) Maël Cattoen (France) Lucas Renoir
21 October	Dutch Open: Dates: 23 October – 27 October; Host: 's-Hertogenbosch, Netherlands; Venue: Maaspoort; Level: International Challenge; Prize: $15,000; Format: 32MS/32WS/32MD/32WD/32XD	Score: 21–17, 21–14	
21 October	Dutch Open: Dates: 23 October – 27 October; Host: 's-Hertogenbosch, Netherlands; Venue: Maaspoort; Level: International Challenge; Prize: $15,000; Format: 32MS/32WS/32MD/32WD/32XD	(Bulgaria) Gabriela Stoeva (Bulgaria) Stefani Stoeva	(England) Chloe Birch (England) Estelle van Leeuwen
21 October	Dutch Open: Dates: 23 October – 27 October; Host: 's-Hertogenbosch, Netherlands; Venue: Maaspoort; Level: International Challenge; Prize: $15,000; Format: 32MS/32WS/32MD/32WD/32XD	Score: 21–15, 21–18	
21 October	Dutch Open: Dates: 23 October – 27 October; Host: 's-Hertogenbosch, Netherlands; Venue: Maaspoort; Level: International Challenge; Prize: $15,000; Format: 32MS/32WS/32MD/32WD/32XD	(England) Callum Hemming (England) Estelle van Leeuwen	(Netherlands) Robin Tabeling (Netherlands) Selena Piek
21 October	Dutch Open: Dates: 23 October – 27 October; Host: 's-Hertogenbosch, Netherlands; Venue: Maaspoort; Level: International Challenge; Prize: $15,000; Format: 32MS/32WS/32MD/32WD/32XD	Score: 17–21, 21–15, 22–20	
21 October	Israel Open (cancelled): Dates: 23 October – 26 October; Host: Kibbutz Hatzor, Israel; Venue: –; Level: Future Series; Format: –		
21 October	Israel Open (cancelled): Dates: 23 October – 26 October; Host: Kibbutz Hatzor, Israel; Venue: –; Level: Future Series; Format: –	Score:	
21 October	Israel Open (cancelled): Dates: 23 October – 26 October; Host: Kibbutz Hatzor, Israel; Venue: –; Level: Future Series; Format: –	Score:	
21 October	Israel Open (cancelled): Dates: 23 October – 26 October; Host: Kibbutz Hatzor, Israel; Venue: –; Level: Future Series; Format: –	Score:	
21 October	Israel Open (cancelled): Dates: 23 October – 26 October; Host: Kibbutz Hatzor, Israel; Venue: –; Level: Future Series; Format: –	Score:	
21 October	Israel Open (cancelled): Dates: 23 October – 26 October; Host: Kibbutz Hatzor, Israel; Venue: –; Level: Future Series; Format: –	Score:	
28 October	Hylo Open (Draw): Date: 29 October – 3 November; Host: Saarbrücken, Germany; Venue: Saarlandhalle; Level: Super 300; Prize: $210,000; Format: 32MS/32WS/32MD/32WD/32XD	(France) Christo Popov	(France) Toma Junior Popov
28 October	Hylo Open (Draw): Date: 29 October – 3 November; Host: Saarbrücken, Germany; Venue: Saarlandhalle; Level: Super 300; Prize: $210,000; Format: 32MS/32WS/32MD/32WD/32XD	Score: 21–13, 21–10	
28 October	Hylo Open (Draw): Date: 29 October – 3 November; Host: Saarbrücken, Germany; Venue: Saarlandhalle; Level: Super 300; Prize: $210,000; Format: 32MS/32WS/32MD/32WD/32XD	(Denmark) Mia Blichfeldt	(India) Malvika Bansod
28 October	Hylo Open (Draw): Date: 29 October – 3 November; Host: Saarbrücken, Germany; Venue: Saarlandhalle; Level: Super 300; Prize: $210,000; Format: 32MS/32WS/32MD/32WD/32XD	Score: 21–10, 21–15	
28 October	Hylo Open (Draw): Date: 29 October – 3 November; Host: Saarbrücken, Germany; Venue: Saarlandhalle; Level: Super 300; Prize: $210,000; Format: 32MS/32WS/32MD/32WD/32XD	(England) Ben Lane (England) Sean Vendy	(Denmark) Rasmus Kjær (Denmark) Frederik Søgaard
28 October	Hylo Open (Draw): Date: 29 October – 3 November; Host: Saarbrücken, Germany; Venue: Saarlandhalle; Level: Super 300; Prize: $210,000; Format: 32MS/32WS/32MD/32WD/32XD	Score: 18–21, 21–15, 21–18	
28 October	Hylo Open (Draw): Date: 29 October – 3 November; Host: Saarbrücken, Germany; Venue: Saarlandhalle; Level: Super 300; Prize: $210,000; Format: 32MS/32WS/32MD/32WD/32XD	(Chinese Taipei) Sung Shuo-yun (Chinese Taipei) Yu Chien-hui	(Ukraine) Polina Buhrova (Ukraine) Yevheniia Kantemyr
28 October	Hylo Open (Draw): Date: 29 October – 3 November; Host: Saarbrücken, Germany; Venue: Saarlandhalle; Level: Super 300; Prize: $210,000; Format: 32MS/32WS/32MD/32WD/32XD	Score: 21–16, 21–14	
28 October	Hylo Open (Draw): Date: 29 October – 3 November; Host: Saarbrücken, Germany; Venue: Saarlandhalle; Level: Super 300; Prize: $210,000; Format: 32MS/32WS/32MD/32WD/32XD	(Denmark) Jesper Toft (Denmark) Amalie Magelund	(Scotland) Alexander Dunn (Scotland) Julie MacPherson
28 October	Hylo Open (Draw): Date: 29 October – 3 November; Host: Saarbrücken, Germany; Venue: Saarlandhalle; Level: Super 300; Prize: $210,000; Format: 32MS/32WS/32MD/32WD/32XD	Score: 21–19, 21–16	
28 October	Indonesia Masters Super 100 II (Draw): Date: 29 October – 3 November; Host: Surabaya, Indonesia; Venue: Jatim International Expo Convention Exhibition; Level: Super 100; Prize: $100,000; Format: 48MS/32WS/32MD/16WD/32XD	(Indonesia) Alwi Farhan	(Malaysia) Aidil Sholeh
28 October	Indonesia Masters Super 100 II (Draw): Date: 29 October – 3 November; Host: Surabaya, Indonesia; Venue: Jatim International Expo Convention Exhibition; Level: Super 100; Prize: $100,000; Format: 48MS/32WS/32MD/16WD/32XD	Score: 21–10, 21–9	
28 October	Indonesia Masters Super 100 II (Draw): Date: 29 October – 3 November; Host: Surabaya, Indonesia; Venue: Jatim International Expo Convention Exhibition; Level: Super 100; Prize: $100,000; Format: 48MS/32WS/32MD/16WD/32XD	(Indonesia) Ni Kadek Dhinda Amartya Pratiwi	(Malaysia) Letshanaa Karupathevan
28 October	Indonesia Masters Super 100 II (Draw): Date: 29 October – 3 November; Host: Surabaya, Indonesia; Venue: Jatim International Expo Convention Exhibition; Level: Super 100; Prize: $100,000; Format: 48MS/32WS/32MD/16WD/32XD	Score: 21–19, 21–17	
28 October	Indonesia Masters Super 100 II (Draw): Date: 29 October – 3 November; Host: Surabaya, Indonesia; Venue: Jatim International Expo Convention Exhibition; Level: Super 100; Prize: $100,000; Format: 48MS/32WS/32MD/16WD/32XD	(Indonesia) Rahmat Hidayat (Indonesia) Yeremia Rambitan	(Indonesia) Raymond Indra (Indonesia) Patra Harapan Rindorindo
28 October	Indonesia Masters Super 100 II (Draw): Date: 29 October – 3 November; Host: Surabaya, Indonesia; Venue: Jatim International Expo Convention Exhibition; Level: Super 100; Prize: $100,000; Format: 48MS/32WS/32MD/16WD/32XD	Score: 23–21, 21–18	
28 October	Indonesia Masters Super 100 II (Draw): Date: 29 October – 3 November; Host: Surabaya, Indonesia; Venue: Jatim International Expo Convention Exhibition; Level: Super 100; Prize: $100,000; Format: 48MS/32WS/32MD/16WD/32XD	(Chinese Taipei) Hsieh Pei-shan (Chinese Taipei) Hung En-tzu	(Indonesia) Lanny Tria Mayasari (Indonesia) Siti Fadia Silva Ramadhanti
28 October	Indonesia Masters Super 100 II (Draw): Date: 29 October – 3 November; Host: Surabaya, Indonesia; Venue: Jatim International Expo Convention Exhibition; Level: Super 100; Prize: $100,000; Format: 48MS/32WS/32MD/16WD/32XD	Score: 21–19, 21–15	
28 October	Indonesia Masters Super 100 II (Draw): Date: 29 October – 3 November; Host: Surabaya, Indonesia; Venue: Jatim International Expo Convention Exhibition; Level: Super 100; Prize: $100,000; Format: 48MS/32WS/32MD/16WD/32XD	(Indonesia) Amri Syahnawi (Indonesia) Nita Violina Marwah	(Indonesia) Marwan Faza (Indonesia) Aisyah Salsabila Putri Pranata
28 October	Indonesia Masters Super 100 II (Draw): Date: 29 October – 3 November; Host: Surabaya, Indonesia; Venue: Jatim International Expo Convention Exhibition; Level: Super 100; Prize: $100,000; Format: 48MS/32WS/32MD/16WD/32XD	Score: 22–20, 21–13	
28 October	Mexican International: Dates: 29 October – 3 November; Host: Aguascalientes, Mexico; Venue: BTC; Level: International Series; Prize: $5,000; Format: 32MS/32WS/32MD/16WD/32XD	(United States) Mark Shelley Alcala	(Mexico) Luis Montoya
28 October	Mexican International: Dates: 29 October – 3 November; Host: Aguascalientes, Mexico; Venue: BTC; Level: International Series; Prize: $5,000; Format: 32MS/32WS/32MD/16WD/32XD	Score: 21–15, 18–21, 21–12	
28 October	Mexican International: Dates: 29 October – 3 November; Host: Aguascalientes, Mexico; Venue: BTC; Level: International Series; Prize: $5,000; Format: 32MS/32WS/32MD/16WD/32XD	(Italy) Gianna Stiglich	(Guatemala) Nikté Sotomayor
28 October	Mexican International: Dates: 29 October – 3 November; Host: Aguascalientes, Mexico; Venue: BTC; Level: International Series; Prize: $5,000; Format: 32MS/32WS/32MD/16WD/32XD	Score: 21–19, 21–17	
28 October	Mexican International: Dates: 29 October – 3 November; Host: Aguascalientes, Mexico; Venue: BTC; Level: International Series; Prize: $5,000; Format: 32MS/32WS/32MD/16WD/32XD	(Guatemala) Christopher Martínez (Guatemala) Jonathan Solís	(United States) Yu-Yuan Chang (Chinese Taipei) Wang Yen Pang
28 October	Mexican International: Dates: 29 October – 3 November; Host: Aguascalientes, Mexico; Venue: BTC; Level: International Series; Prize: $5,000; Format: 32MS/32WS/32MD/16WD/32XD	Score: 14–21, 21–15, 21–8	
28 October	Mexican International: Dates: 29 October – 3 November; Host: Aguascalientes, Mexico; Venue: BTC; Level: International Series; Prize: $5,000; Format: 32MS/32WS/32MD/16WD/32XD	(Mexico) Romina Fregoso (Mexico) Miriam Rodríguez	(Mexico) Cecilia Madera (Mexico) Isabella Puente
28 October	Mexican International: Dates: 29 October – 3 November; Host: Aguascalientes, Mexico; Venue: BTC; Level: International Series; Prize: $5,000; Format: 32MS/32WS/32MD/16WD/32XD	Score: 21–16, 21–17	
28 October	Mexican International: Dates: 29 October – 3 November; Host: Aguascalientes, Mexico; Venue: BTC; Level: International Series; Prize: $5,000; Format: 32MS/32WS/32MD/16WD/32XD	(Mexico) Luis Montoya (Mexico) Miriam Rodríguez	(Guatemala) Christopher Martínez (Guatemala) Diana Corleto
28 October	Mexican International: Dates: 29 October – 3 November; Host: Aguascalientes, Mexico; Venue: BTC; Level: International Series; Prize: $5,000; Format: 32MS/32WS/32MD/16WD/32XD	Score: 21–16, 21–11	
28 October	Hungarian International: Dates: 30 October – 2 November; Host: Budapest, Hungary; Venue: Sterbinszky Hall; Level: International Series; Prize: $5,000; Format: 32MS/32WS/32MD/32WD/32XD	(Denmark) Jakob Houe	(Denmark) Ditlev Jaeger Holm
28 October	Hungarian International: Dates: 30 October – 2 November; Host: Budapest, Hungary; Venue: Sterbinszky Hall; Level: International Series; Prize: $5,000; Format: 32MS/32WS/32MD/32WD/32XD	Score: 19–21, 21–12, 21–19	
28 October	Hungarian International: Dates: 30 October – 2 November; Host: Budapest, Hungary; Venue: Sterbinszky Hall; Level: International Series; Prize: $5,000; Format: 32MS/32WS/32MD/32WD/32XD	(Chinese Taipei) Wang Yu-si	(Denmark) Laura Fløj Thomsen
28 October	Hungarian International: Dates: 30 October – 2 November; Host: Budapest, Hungary; Venue: Sterbinszky Hall; Level: International Series; Prize: $5,000; Format: 32MS/32WS/32MD/32WD/32XD	Score: 21–15, 21–17	
28 October	Hungarian International: Dates: 30 October – 2 November; Host: Budapest, Hungary; Venue: Sterbinszky Hall; Level: International Series; Prize: $5,000; Format: 32MS/32WS/32MD/32WD/32XD	(Canada) Jonathan Lai (Canada) Nyl Yakura	(England) Oliver Butler (England) Samuel Jones
28 October	Hungarian International: Dates: 30 October – 2 November; Host: Budapest, Hungary; Venue: Sterbinszky Hall; Level: International Series; Prize: $5,000; Format: 32MS/32WS/32MD/32WD/32XD	Score: 9–21, 21–11, 21–11	
28 October	Hungarian International: Dates: 30 October – 2 November; Host: Budapest, Hungary; Venue: Sterbinszky Hall; Level: International Series; Prize: $5,000; Format: 32MS/32WS/32MD/32WD/32XD	(England) Abbygael Harris (England) Lizzie Tolman	(Sweden) Malena Norrman (France) Xu Wei
28 October	Hungarian International: Dates: 30 October – 2 November; Host: Budapest, Hungary; Venue: Sterbinszky Hall; Level: International Series; Prize: $5,000; Format: 32MS/32WS/32MD/32WD/32XD	Score: 19–21, 21–19, 21–14	
28 October	Hungarian International: Dates: 30 October – 2 November; Host: Budapest, Hungary; Venue: Sterbinszky Hall; Level: International Series; Prize: $5,000; Format: 32MS/32WS/32MD/32WD/32XD	(Serbia) Mihajlo Tomic (Serbia) Andjela Vitman	(Denmark) Calvin Lundsgaard (Sweden) Malena Norrman
28 October	Hungarian International: Dates: 30 October – 2 November; Host: Budapest, Hungary; Venue: Sterbinszky Hall; Level: International Series; Prize: $5,000; Format: 32MS/32WS/32MD/32WD/32XD	Score: 21–10, 22–20	

=== November ===
Week commencing	Tournament	Champions	Runners-up
4 November	Korea Masters (Draw): Date: 5 November – 10 November; Host: Iksan, South Korea; Venue: Iksan Gymnasium; Level: Super 300; Prize: $210,000; Format: 32MS/32WS/32MD/32WD/32XD	(Thailand) Kunlavut Vitidsarn	(China) Wang Zhengxing
4 November	Korea Masters (Draw): Date: 5 November – 10 November; Host: Iksan, South Korea; Venue: Iksan Gymnasium; Level: Super 300; Prize: $210,000; Format: 32MS/32WS/32MD/32WD/32XD	Score: 21–18, 21–18	
4 November	Korea Masters (Draw): Date: 5 November – 10 November; Host: Iksan, South Korea; Venue: Iksan Gymnasium; Level: Super 300; Prize: $210,000; Format: 32MS/32WS/32MD/32WD/32XD	(Indonesia) Putri Kusuma Wardani	(China) Han Qianxi
4 November	Korea Masters (Draw): Date: 5 November – 10 November; Host: Iksan, South Korea; Venue: Iksan Gymnasium; Level: Super 300; Prize: $210,000; Format: 32MS/32WS/32MD/32WD/32XD	Score: 21–14, 21–14	
4 November	Korea Masters (Draw): Date: 5 November – 10 November; Host: Iksan, South Korea; Venue: Iksan Gymnasium; Level: Super 300; Prize: $210,000; Format: 32MS/32WS/32MD/32WD/32XD	(Malaysia) Aaron Chia (Malaysia) Soh Wooi Yik	(South Korea) Jin Yong (South Korea) Kim Won-ho
4 November	Korea Masters (Draw): Date: 5 November – 10 November; Host: Iksan, South Korea; Venue: Iksan Gymnasium; Level: Super 300; Prize: $210,000; Format: 32MS/32WS/32MD/32WD/32XD	Score: 21–23, 21–19, 21–14	
4 November	Korea Masters (Draw): Date: 5 November – 10 November; Host: Iksan, South Korea; Venue: Iksan Gymnasium; Level: Super 300; Prize: $210,000; Format: 32MS/32WS/32MD/32WD/32XD	(South Korea) Kim Hye-jeong (South Korea) Kong Hee-yong	(China) Li Yijing (China) Luo Xumin
4 November	Korea Masters (Draw): Date: 5 November – 10 November; Host: Iksan, South Korea; Venue: Iksan Gymnasium; Level: Super 300; Prize: $210,000; Format: 32MS/32WS/32MD/32WD/32XD	Score: 21–14, 16–21, 21–18	
4 November	Korea Masters (Draw): Date: 5 November – 10 November; Host: Iksan, South Korea; Venue: Iksan Gymnasium; Level: Super 300; Prize: $210,000; Format: 32MS/32WS/32MD/32WD/32XD	(China) Guo Xinwa (China) Chen Fanghui	(Indonesia) Dejan Ferdinansyah (Indonesia) Gloria Emanuelle Widjaja
4 November	Korea Masters (Draw): Date: 5 November – 10 November; Host: Iksan, South Korea; Venue: Iksan Gymnasium; Level: Super 300; Prize: $210,000; Format: 32MS/32WS/32MD/32WD/32XD	Score: 21–10, 21–12	
4 November	India International (Hyderabad): Dates: 5 November – 10 November; Host: Hyderabad, India; Venue: Kotak Pullela Gopichand Badminton Academy; Level: International Challenge; Prize: $25,000; Format: 64MS/64WS/32MD/32WD/32XD	(India) Rithvik Sanjeevi	(India) Tarun Reddy Katam
4 November	India International (Hyderabad): Dates: 5 November – 10 November; Host: Hyderabad, India; Venue: Kotak Pullela Gopichand Badminton Academy; Level: International Challenge; Prize: $25,000; Format: 64MS/64WS/32MD/32WD/32XD	Score: 21–11, 21–14	
4 November	India International (Hyderabad): Dates: 5 November – 10 November; Host: Hyderabad, India; Venue: Kotak Pullela Gopichand Badminton Academy; Level: International Challenge; Prize: $25,000; Format: 64MS/64WS/32MD/32WD/32XD	(India) Isharani Baruah	(India) Rakshitha Ramraj
4 November	India International (Hyderabad): Dates: 5 November – 10 November; Host: Hyderabad, India; Venue: Kotak Pullela Gopichand Badminton Academy; Level: International Challenge; Prize: $25,000; Format: 64MS/64WS/32MD/32WD/32XD	Score: 21–15, 9–21, 21–17	
4 November	India International (Hyderabad): Dates: 5 November – 10 November; Host: Hyderabad, India; Venue: Kotak Pullela Gopichand Badminton Academy; Level: International Challenge; Prize: $25,000; Format: 64MS/64WS/32MD/32WD/32XD	(India) Pruthvi Krishnamurthy Roy (India) K. Sai Pratheek	(India) Arjun M. R. (India) Vishnuvardhan Goud Panjala
4 November	India International (Hyderabad): Dates: 5 November – 10 November; Host: Hyderabad, India; Venue: Kotak Pullela Gopichand Badminton Academy; Level: International Challenge; Prize: $25,000; Format: 64MS/64WS/32MD/32WD/32XD	Score: 21–19, 21–17	
4 November	India International (Hyderabad): Dates: 5 November – 10 November; Host: Hyderabad, India; Venue: Kotak Pullela Gopichand Badminton Academy; Level: International Challenge; Prize: $25,000; Format: 64MS/64WS/32MD/32WD/32XD	(India) Priya Konjengbam (India) Shruti Mishra	(India) Arathi Sara Sunil (India) Varshini Viswanath Sri
4 November	India International (Hyderabad): Dates: 5 November – 10 November; Host: Hyderabad, India; Venue: Kotak Pullela Gopichand Badminton Academy; Level: International Challenge; Prize: $25,000; Format: 64MS/64WS/32MD/32WD/32XD	Score: 21–18, 21–13	
4 November	India International (Hyderabad): Dates: 5 November – 10 November; Host: Hyderabad, India; Venue: Kotak Pullela Gopichand Badminton Academy; Level: International Challenge; Prize: $25,000; Format: 64MS/64WS/32MD/32WD/32XD	(India) Rohan Kapoor (India) Gadde Ruthvika Shivani	(India) Hariharan Amsakarunan (India) Tanisha Crasto
4 November	India International (Hyderabad): Dates: 5 November – 10 November; Host: Hyderabad, India; Venue: Kotak Pullela Gopichand Badminton Academy; Level: International Challenge; Prize: $25,000; Format: 64MS/64WS/32MD/32WD/32XD	Score: 21–17, 21–19	
4 November	Norwegian International: Dates: 7 November – 10 November; Host: Sandefjord, Norway; Venue: Jotunhallen; Level: International Series; Prize: $5,000; Format: 32MS/32WS/32MD/32WD/32XD	(Chinese Taipei) Chen Chi-ting	(Sweden) Romeo Makboul
4 November	Norwegian International: Dates: 7 November – 10 November; Host: Sandefjord, Norway; Venue: Jotunhallen; Level: International Series; Prize: $5,000; Format: 32MS/32WS/32MD/32WD/32XD	Score: 21–18, 21–17	
4 November	Norwegian International: Dates: 7 November – 10 November; Host: Sandefjord, Norway; Venue: Jotunhallen; Level: International Series; Prize: $5,000; Format: 32MS/32WS/32MD/32WD/32XD	(Chinese Taipei) Wang Yu-si	(Hungary) Ágnes Kőrösi
4 November	Norwegian International: Dates: 7 November – 10 November; Host: Sandefjord, Norway; Venue: Jotunhallen; Level: International Series; Prize: $5,000; Format: 32MS/32WS/32MD/32WD/32XD	Score: 18–21, 21–17, 21–15	
4 November	Norwegian International: Dates: 7 November – 10 November; Host: Sandefjord, Norway; Venue: Jotunhallen; Level: International Series; Prize: $5,000; Format: 32MS/32WS/32MD/32WD/32XD	(France) Maël Cattoen (France) Lucas Renoir	(Sweden) Filip Karlborg (Sweden) Mio Molin
4 November	Norwegian International: Dates: 7 November – 10 November; Host: Sandefjord, Norway; Venue: Jotunhallen; Level: International Series; Prize: $5,000; Format: 32MS/32WS/32MD/32WD/32XD	Score: 21–11, 21–10	
4 November	Norwegian International: Dates: 7 November – 10 November; Host: Sandefjord, Norway; Venue: Jotunhallen; Level: International Series; Prize: $5,000; Format: 32MS/32WS/32MD/32WD/32XD	(Poland) Paulina Hankiewicz (Poland) Kornelia Marczak	(France) Sharone Bauer (France) Emilie Vercelot
4 November	Norwegian International: Dates: 7 November – 10 November; Host: Sandefjord, Norway; Venue: Jotunhallen; Level: International Series; Prize: $5,000; Format: 32MS/32WS/32MD/32WD/32XD	Score: 21–14, 12–21, 23–21	
4 November	Norwegian International: Dates: 7 November – 10 November; Host: Sandefjord, Norway; Venue: Jotunhallen; Level: International Series; Prize: $5,000; Format: 32MS/32WS/32MD/32WD/32XD	(Denmark) Otto Reiler (Denmark) Amanda Aarrebo Petersen	(Norway) Jonas Østhassel (Norway) Julie Abusdal
4 November	Norwegian International: Dates: 7 November – 10 November; Host: Sandefjord, Norway; Venue: Jotunhallen; Level: International Series; Prize: $5,000; Format: 32MS/32WS/32MD/32WD/32XD	Score: 21–19, 21–19	
11 November	Spanish International (cancelled): Dates: 11 November – 14 November; Host: Blanca Dona, Ibiza, Spain; Venue: –; Level: Future Series; Prize: $2,500; Format: –		
11 November	Spanish International (cancelled): Dates: 11 November – 14 November; Host: Blanca Dona, Ibiza, Spain; Venue: –; Level: Future Series; Prize: $2,500; Format: –	Score:	
11 November	Spanish International (cancelled): Dates: 11 November – 14 November; Host: Blanca Dona, Ibiza, Spain; Venue: –; Level: Future Series; Prize: $2,500; Format: –	Score:	
11 November	Spanish International (cancelled): Dates: 11 November – 14 November; Host: Blanca Dona, Ibiza, Spain; Venue: –; Level: Future Series; Prize: $2,500; Format: –	Score:	
11 November	Spanish International (cancelled): Dates: 11 November – 14 November; Host: Blanca Dona, Ibiza, Spain; Venue: –; Level: Future Series; Prize: $2,500; Format: –	Score:	
11 November	Spanish International (cancelled): Dates: 11 November – 14 November; Host: Blanca Dona, Ibiza, Spain; Venue: –; Level: Future Series; Prize: $2,500; Format: –	Score:	
11 November	Japan Masters (Draw): Date: 12 November – 17 November; Host: Kumamoto, Japan; Venue: Kumamoto Prefectural Gymnasium; Level: Super 500; Prize: $420,000; Format: 32MS/32WS/32MD/32WD/32XD	(China) Li Shifeng	(Malaysia) Leong Jun Hao
11 November	Japan Masters (Draw): Date: 12 November – 17 November; Host: Kumamoto, Japan; Venue: Kumamoto Prefectural Gymnasium; Level: Super 500; Prize: $420,000; Format: 32MS/32WS/32MD/32WD/32XD	Score: 21–10, 21–13	
11 November	Japan Masters (Draw): Date: 12 November – 17 November; Host: Kumamoto, Japan; Venue: Kumamoto Prefectural Gymnasium; Level: Super 500; Prize: $420,000; Format: 32MS/32WS/32MD/32WD/32XD	(Japan) Akane Yamaguchi	(Indonesia) Gregoria Mariska Tunjung
11 November	Japan Masters (Draw): Date: 12 November – 17 November; Host: Kumamoto, Japan; Venue: Kumamoto Prefectural Gymnasium; Level: Super 500; Prize: $420,000; Format: 32MS/32WS/32MD/32WD/32XD	Score: 21–12, 21–12	
11 November	Japan Masters (Draw): Date: 12 November – 17 November; Host: Kumamoto, Japan; Venue: Kumamoto Prefectural Gymnasium; Level: Super 500; Prize: $420,000; Format: 32MS/32WS/32MD/32WD/32XD	(Indonesia) Fajar Alfian (Indonesia) Muhammad Rian Ardianto	(Japan) Takuro Hoki (Japan) Yugo Kobayashi
11 November	Japan Masters (Draw): Date: 12 November – 17 November; Host: Kumamoto, Japan; Venue: Kumamoto Prefectural Gymnasium; Level: Super 500; Prize: $420,000; Format: 32MS/32WS/32MD/32WD/32XD	Score: 21–15, 17–21, 21–17	
11 November	Japan Masters (Draw): Date: 12 November – 17 November; Host: Kumamoto, Japan; Venue: Kumamoto Prefectural Gymnasium; Level: Super 500; Prize: $420,000; Format: 32MS/32WS/32MD/32WD/32XD	(China) Liu Shengshu (China) Tan Ning	(Japan) Yuki Fukushima (Japan) Mayu Matsumoto
11 November	Japan Masters (Draw): Date: 12 November – 17 November; Host: Kumamoto, Japan; Venue: Kumamoto Prefectural Gymnasium; Level: Super 500; Prize: $420,000; Format: 32MS/32WS/32MD/32WD/32XD	Score: 21–15, 21–5	
11 November	Japan Masters (Draw): Date: 12 November – 17 November; Host: Kumamoto, Japan; Venue: Kumamoto Prefectural Gymnasium; Level: Super 500; Prize: $420,000; Format: 32MS/32WS/32MD/32WD/32XD	(Thailand) Dechapol Puavaranukroh (Thailand) Supissara Paewsampran	(France) Thom Gicquel (France) Delphine Delrue
11 November	Japan Masters (Draw): Date: 12 November – 17 November; Host: Kumamoto, Japan; Venue: Kumamoto Prefectural Gymnasium; Level: Super 500; Prize: $420,000; Format: 32MS/32WS/32MD/32WD/32XD	Score: 21–16, 10–21, 21–17	
11 November	India International (Raipur): Dates: 12 November – 17 November; Host: Raipur, India; Venue: iSportz Badminton Arena; Level: International Challenge; Prize: $25,000; Format: 64MS/64WS/32MD/32WD/32XD	(India) Mithun Manjunath	(India) B. M. Rahul Bharadwaj
11 November	India International (Raipur): Dates: 12 November – 17 November; Host: Raipur, India; Venue: iSportz Badminton Arena; Level: International Challenge; Prize: $25,000; Format: 64MS/64WS/32MD/32WD/32XD	Score: 5–13 retired	
11 November	India International (Raipur): Dates: 12 November – 17 November; Host: Raipur, India; Venue: iSportz Badminton Arena; Level: International Challenge; Prize: $25,000; Format: 64MS/64WS/32MD/32WD/32XD	(India) Rakshitha Ramraj	(India) Tanvi Patri
11 November	India International (Raipur): Dates: 12 November – 17 November; Host: Raipur, India; Venue: iSportz Badminton Arena; Level: International Challenge; Prize: $25,000; Format: 64MS/64WS/32MD/32WD/32XD	Score: 17–21, 21–12, 21–12	
11 November	India International (Raipur): Dates: 12 November – 17 November; Host: Raipur, India; Venue: iSportz Badminton Arena; Level: International Challenge; Prize: $25,000; Format: 64MS/64WS/32MD/32WD/32XD	(India) Hariharan Amsakarunan (India) Ruban Kumar Rethinasabapathi	(India) Dingku Singh Konthoujam (India) Amaan Mohammad
11 November	India International (Raipur): Dates: 12 November – 17 November; Host: Raipur, India; Venue: iSportz Badminton Arena; Level: International Challenge; Prize: $25,000; Format: 64MS/64WS/32MD/32WD/32XD	Score: 21–15, 21–16	
11 November	India International (Raipur): Dates: 12 November – 17 November; Host: Raipur, India; Venue: iSportz Badminton Arena; Level: International Challenge; Prize: $25,000; Format: 64MS/64WS/32MD/32WD/32XD	(India) Arathi Sara Sunil (India) Varshini Viswanath Sri	(India) Kavya Gupta (India) Radhika Sharma
11 November	India International (Raipur): Dates: 12 November – 17 November; Host: Raipur, India; Venue: iSportz Badminton Arena; Level: International Challenge; Prize: $25,000; Format: 64MS/64WS/32MD/32WD/32XD	Score: 21–18, 21–19	
11 November	India International (Raipur): Dates: 12 November – 17 November; Host: Raipur, India; Venue: iSportz Badminton Arena; Level: International Challenge; Prize: $25,000; Format: 64MS/64WS/32MD/32WD/32XD	(India) Rohan Kapoor (India) Gadde Ruthvika Shivani	(India) Ashith Surya (India) Amrutha Pramuthesh
11 November	India International (Raipur): Dates: 12 November – 17 November; Host: Raipur, India; Venue: iSportz Badminton Arena; Level: International Challenge; Prize: $25,000; Format: 64MS/64WS/32MD/32WD/32XD	Score: 21–16, 19–21, 21–12	
11 November	Malaysia International: Dates: 12 November – 17 November; Host: Johor, Malaysia; Venue: Arena Larkin MBJB; Level: International Series; Prize: $10,000; Format: 64MS/32WS/32MD/32WD/32XD	(Indonesia) Richie Duta Richardo	(China) Liu Haoda
11 November	Malaysia International: Dates: 12 November – 17 November; Host: Johor, Malaysia; Venue: Arena Larkin MBJB; Level: International Series; Prize: $10,000; Format: 64MS/32WS/32MD/32WD/32XD	Score: 21–17, 21–13	
11 November	Malaysia International: Dates: 12 November – 17 November; Host: Johor, Malaysia; Venue: Arena Larkin MBJB; Level: International Series; Prize: $10,000; Format: 64MS/32WS/32MD/32WD/32XD	(Malaysia) Siti Zulaikha	(China) Luo Shengxuan
11 November	Malaysia International: Dates: 12 November – 17 November; Host: Johor, Malaysia; Venue: Arena Larkin MBJB; Level: International Series; Prize: $10,000; Format: 64MS/32WS/32MD/32WD/32XD	Score: 21–13, 21–16	
11 November	Malaysia International: Dates: 12 November – 17 November; Host: Johor, Malaysia; Venue: Arena Larkin MBJB; Level: International Series; Prize: $10,000; Format: 64MS/32WS/32MD/32WD/32XD	(Indonesia) Emanuel Randhy Febryto (Indonesia) Reza Dwicahya Purnama	(China) An Junchen (China) Chen Sihang
11 November	Malaysia International: Dates: 12 November – 17 November; Host: Johor, Malaysia; Venue: Arena Larkin MBJB; Level: International Series; Prize: $10,000; Format: 64MS/32WS/32MD/32WD/32XD	Score: 21–13, 21–17	
11 November	Malaysia International: Dates: 12 November – 17 November; Host: Johor, Malaysia; Venue: Arena Larkin MBJB; Level: International Series; Prize: $10,000; Format: 64MS/32WS/32MD/32WD/32XD	(China) Lin Fangling (China) Zhou Xinru	(Malaysia) Cheng Su Hui (Malaysia) Lee Xin Jie
11 November	Malaysia International: Dates: 12 November – 17 November; Host: Johor, Malaysia; Venue: Arena Larkin MBJB; Level: International Series; Prize: $10,000; Format: 64MS/32WS/32MD/32WD/32XD	Score: 21–13, 21–18	
11 November	Malaysia International: Dates: 12 November – 17 November; Host: Johor, Malaysia; Venue: Arena Larkin MBJB; Level: International Series; Prize: $10,000; Format: 64MS/32WS/32MD/32WD/32XD	(China) Shang Yichen (China) Lin Fangling	(China) Chen Sihang (China) Zhou Xinru
11 November	Malaysia International: Dates: 12 November – 17 November; Host: Johor, Malaysia; Venue: Arena Larkin MBJB; Level: International Series; Prize: $10,000; Format: 64MS/32WS/32MD/32WD/32XD	Score: 21–13, 21–16	
11 November	Vietnam International (Bắc Giang): Dates: 12 November – 17 November; Host: Bắc Giang, Vietnam; Venue: Bắc Giang Gymnasiums; Level: International Series; Prize: $5,000; Format: 64MS/32WS/32MD/32WD/32XD	(South Korea) Kim Byung-jae	(Chinese Taipei) Wang Yu-kai
11 November	Vietnam International (Bắc Giang): Dates: 12 November – 17 November; Host: Bắc Giang, Vietnam; Venue: Bắc Giang Gymnasiums; Level: International Series; Prize: $5,000; Format: 64MS/32WS/32MD/32WD/32XD	Score: 22–20, 12–21, 21–13	
11 November	Vietnam International (Bắc Giang): Dates: 12 November – 17 November; Host: Bắc Giang, Vietnam; Venue: Bắc Giang Gymnasiums; Level: International Series; Prize: $5,000; Format: 64MS/32WS/32MD/32WD/32XD	(South Korea) Kim Min-ji	(South Korea) Kim Min-sun
11 November	Vietnam International (Bắc Giang): Dates: 12 November – 17 November; Host: Bắc Giang, Vietnam; Venue: Bắc Giang Gymnasiums; Level: International Series; Prize: $5,000; Format: 64MS/32WS/32MD/32WD/32XD	Score: 21–18, 11–21, 21–13	
11 November	Vietnam International (Bắc Giang): Dates: 12 November – 17 November; Host: Bắc Giang, Vietnam; Venue: Bắc Giang Gymnasiums; Level: International Series; Prize: $5,000; Format: 64MS/32WS/32MD/32WD/32XD	(Chinese Taipei) He Zhi-wei (Chinese Taipei) Huang Jui-hsuan	(Vietnam) Nguyễn Đình Hoàng (Vietnam) Trần Đình Mạnh
11 November	Vietnam International (Bắc Giang): Dates: 12 November – 17 November; Host: Bắc Giang, Vietnam; Venue: Bắc Giang Gymnasiums; Level: International Series; Prize: $5,000; Format: 64MS/32WS/32MD/32WD/32XD	Score: 22–20, 21–19	
11 November	Vietnam International (Bắc Giang): Dates: 12 November – 17 November; Host: Bắc Giang, Vietnam; Venue: Bắc Giang Gymnasiums; Level: International Series; Prize: $5,000; Format: 64MS/32WS/32MD/32WD/32XD	(Indonesia) Isyana Syahira Meida (Indonesia) Rinjani Kwinara Nastine	(Philippines) Airah Mae Nicole Albo (Philippines) Eleanor Christine Inlayo
11 November	Vietnam International (Bắc Giang): Dates: 12 November – 17 November; Host: Bắc Giang, Vietnam; Venue: Bắc Giang Gymnasiums; Level: International Series; Prize: $5,000; Format: 64MS/32WS/32MD/32WD/32XD	Score: 21–18, 21–14	
11 November	Vietnam International (Bắc Giang): Dates: 12 November – 17 November; Host: Bắc Giang, Vietnam; Venue: Bắc Giang Gymnasiums; Level: International Series; Prize: $5,000; Format: 64MS/32WS/32MD/32WD/32XD	(Vietnam) Trần Đình Mạnh (Vietnam) Phạm Thị Khánh	(Chinese Taipei) Chen Bo-yuan (Chinese Taipei) Sun Liang-ching
11 November	Vietnam International (Bắc Giang): Dates: 12 November – 17 November; Host: Bắc Giang, Vietnam; Venue: Bắc Giang Gymnasiums; Level: International Series; Prize: $5,000; Format: 64MS/32WS/32MD/32WD/32XD	Score: 21–19, 21–13	
11 November	Bahrain International (I): Dates: 12 November – 17 November; Host: Manama, Bahrain; Venue: The Indian Club, Bahrain; Level: International Series; Prize: $5,000; Format: 32MS/16WS/16MD/16WD/16XD	(India) Kavin Thangam Kavin	(Philippines) Jewel Albo
11 November	Bahrain International (I): Dates: 12 November – 17 November; Host: Manama, Bahrain; Venue: The Indian Club, Bahrain; Level: International Series; Prize: $5,000; Format: 32MS/16WS/16MD/16WD/16XD	Score: 21–12, 21–17	
11 November	Bahrain International (I): Dates: 12 November – 17 November; Host: Manama, Bahrain; Venue: The Indian Club, Bahrain; Level: International Series; Prize: $5,000; Format: 32MS/16WS/16MD/16WD/16XD	(India) Prakriti Bharath	(Sri Lanka) Ranithma Liyanage
11 November	Bahrain International (I): Dates: 12 November – 17 November; Host: Manama, Bahrain; Venue: The Indian Club, Bahrain; Level: International Series; Prize: $5,000; Format: 32MS/16WS/16MD/16WD/16XD	Score: 21–13, 21–17	
11 November	Bahrain International (I): Dates: 12 November – 17 November; Host: Manama, Bahrain; Venue: The Indian Club, Bahrain; Level: International Series; Prize: $5,000; Format: 32MS/16WS/16MD/16WD/16XD	(Philippines) Solomon Padiz Jr. (Philippines) Julius Villabrille	(Philippines) Christian Bernardo (Philippines) Alvin Morada
11 November	Bahrain International (I): Dates: 12 November – 17 November; Host: Manama, Bahrain; Venue: The Indian Club, Bahrain; Level: International Series; Prize: $5,000; Format: 32MS/16WS/16MD/16WD/16XD	Score: 21–14, 15–21, 28–26	
11 November	Bahrain International (I): Dates: 12 November – 17 November; Host: Manama, Bahrain; Venue: The Indian Club, Bahrain; Level: International Series; Prize: $5,000; Format: 32MS/16WS/16MD/16WD/16XD	(India) Annanya Pravin (India) Prerana N. Shet	(United Arab Emirates) Mysha Omer Khan (United Arab Emirates) Taabia Khan
11 November	Bahrain International (I): Dates: 12 November – 17 November; Host: Manama, Bahrain; Venue: The Indian Club, Bahrain; Level: International Series; Prize: $5,000; Format: 32MS/16WS/16MD/16WD/16XD	Score: 21–15, 18–21, 21–15	
11 November	Bahrain International (I): Dates: 12 November – 17 November; Host: Manama, Bahrain; Venue: The Indian Club, Bahrain; Level: International Series; Prize: $5,000; Format: 32MS/16WS/16MD/16WD/16XD	(Bulgaria) Evgeni Panev (Bulgaria) Gabriela Stoeva	(United Arab Emirates) Aakash Ravikumar (United Arab Emirates) Sakshi Kurbkhelgi
11 November	Bahrain International (I): Dates: 12 November – 17 November; Host: Manama, Bahrain; Venue: The Indian Club, Bahrain; Level: International Series; Prize: $5,000; Format: 32MS/16WS/16MD/16WD/16XD	Score: 21–14, 21–18	
11 November	Irish Open: Dates: 13 November – 16 November; Host: Dublin, Republic of Ireland; Venue: National Indoor Arena; Level: International Challenge; Prize: $15,000; Format: 32MS/32WS/32MD/32WD/32XD	(Republic of Ireland) Nhat Nguyen	(Malaysia) Tan Jia Jie
11 November	Irish Open: Dates: 13 November – 16 November; Host: Dublin, Republic of Ireland; Venue: National Indoor Arena; Level: International Challenge; Prize: $15,000; Format: 32MS/32WS/32MD/32WD/32XD	Score: 22–20, 14–21, 21–19	
11 November	Irish Open: Dates: 13 November – 16 November; Host: Dublin, Republic of Ireland; Venue: National Indoor Arena; Level: International Challenge; Prize: $15,000; Format: 32MS/32WS/32MD/32WD/32XD	(Japan) Sakura Masuki	(Canada) Rachel Chan
11 November	Irish Open: Dates: 13 November – 16 November; Host: Dublin, Republic of Ireland; Venue: National Indoor Arena; Level: International Challenge; Prize: $15,000; Format: 32MS/32WS/32MD/32WD/32XD	Score: 26–24, 21–10	
11 November	Irish Open: Dates: 13 November – 16 November; Host: Dublin, Republic of Ireland; Venue: National Indoor Arena; Level: International Challenge; Prize: $15,000; Format: 32MS/32WS/32MD/32WD/32XD	(Denmark) William Kryger Boe (Denmark) Christian Faust Kjær	(Scotland) Christopher Grimley (Scotland) Matthew Grimley
11 November	Irish Open: Dates: 13 November – 16 November; Host: Dublin, Republic of Ireland; Venue: National Indoor Arena; Level: International Challenge; Prize: $15,000; Format: 32MS/32WS/32MD/32WD/32XD	Score: 21–15, 21–8	
11 November	Irish Open: Dates: 13 November – 16 November; Host: Dublin, Republic of Ireland; Venue: National Indoor Arena; Level: International Challenge; Prize: $15,000; Format: 32MS/32WS/32MD/32WD/32XD	(Denmark) Natasja Anthonisen (Denmark) Maiken Fruergaard	(England) Chloe Birch (England) Estelle van Leeuwen
11 November	Irish Open: Dates: 13 November – 16 November; Host: Dublin, Republic of Ireland; Venue: National Indoor Arena; Level: International Challenge; Prize: $15,000; Format: 32MS/32WS/32MD/32WD/32XD	Score: 21–19, 21–19	
11 November	Irish Open: Dates: 13 November – 16 November; Host: Dublin, Republic of Ireland; Venue: National Indoor Arena; Level: International Challenge; Prize: $15,000; Format: 32MS/32WS/32MD/32WD/32XD	(England) Callum Hemming (England) Estelle van Leeuwen	(Denmark) Rasmus Espersen (Denmark) Amalie Cecilie Kudsk
11 November	Irish Open: Dates: 13 November – 16 November; Host: Dublin, Republic of Ireland; Venue: National Indoor Arena; Level: International Challenge; Prize: $15,000; Format: 32MS/32WS/32MD/32WD/32XD	Score: 19–21, 21–18, 21–14	
11 November	Suriname International: Dates: 13 November – 17 November; Host: Paramaribo, Suriname; Venue: Ring Sport Center; Level: International Series; Prize: $5,000; Format: 32MS/16WS/16MD/8WD/16XD	(Israel) Misha Zilberman	(Peru) Adriano Viale
11 November	Suriname International: Dates: 13 November – 17 November; Host: Paramaribo, Suriname; Venue: Ring Sport Center; Level: International Series; Prize: $5,000; Format: 32MS/16WS/16MD/8WD/16XD	Score: 21–12, 23–21	
11 November	Suriname International: Dates: 13 November – 17 November; Host: Paramaribo, Suriname; Venue: Ring Sport Center; Level: International Series; Prize: $5,000; Format: 32MS/16WS/16MD/8WD/16XD	(Peru) Inés Castillo	(Mexico) Sabrina Solís
11 November	Suriname International: Dates: 13 November – 17 November; Host: Paramaribo, Suriname; Venue: Ring Sport Center; Level: International Series; Prize: $5,000; Format: 32MS/16WS/16MD/8WD/16XD	Score: 21–15, 21–16	
11 November	Suriname International: Dates: 13 November – 17 November; Host: Paramaribo, Suriname; Venue: Ring Sport Center; Level: International Series; Prize: $5,000; Format: 32MS/16WS/16MD/8WD/16XD	(Suriname) Sören Opti (Suriname) Mitchel Wongsodikromo	(Suriname) Rivano Bisphan (Suriname) Danny Chen
11 November	Suriname International: Dates: 13 November – 17 November; Host: Paramaribo, Suriname; Venue: Ring Sport Center; Level: International Series; Prize: $5,000; Format: 32MS/16WS/16MD/8WD/16XD	Score: 21–14, 21–8	
11 November	Suriname International: Dates: 13 November – 17 November; Host: Paramaribo, Suriname; Venue: Ring Sport Center; Level: International Series; Prize: $5,000; Format: 32MS/16WS/16MD/8WD/16XD	(Peru) Inés Castillo (Peru) Namie Miyahira	(Trinidad and Tobago) Chequeda de Boulet (Guyana) Priyanna Ramdhani
11 November	Suriname International: Dates: 13 November – 17 November; Host: Paramaribo, Suriname; Venue: Ring Sport Center; Level: International Series; Prize: $5,000; Format: 32MS/16WS/16MD/8WD/16XD	Score: 21–16, 21–12	
11 November	Suriname International: Dates: 13 November – 17 November; Host: Paramaribo, Suriname; Venue: Ring Sport Center; Level: International Series; Prize: $5,000; Format: 32MS/16WS/16MD/8WD/16XD	(Guatemala) Christopher Martínez (Guatemala) Diana Corleto	(Suriname) Rivano Bisphan (Suriname) Sion Zeegelaar
11 November	Suriname International: Dates: 13 November – 17 November; Host: Paramaribo, Suriname; Venue: Ring Sport Center; Level: International Series; Prize: $5,000; Format: 32MS/16WS/16MD/8WD/16XD	Score: 21–14, 21–6	
11 November	Zambia International: Dates: 14 November – 17 November; Host: Lusaka, Zambia; Venue: OYDC – National Sports Development Centre; Level: International Series; Prize: $5,000; Format: 32MS/16WS/16MD/8WD/16XD	(Kazakhstan) Dmitriy Panarin	(Azerbaijan) Dicky Dwi Pangestu
11 November	Zambia International: Dates: 14 November – 17 November; Host: Lusaka, Zambia; Venue: OYDC – National Sports Development Centre; Level: International Series; Prize: $5,000; Format: 32MS/16WS/16MD/8WD/16XD	Score: 21–11, 21–17	
11 November	Zambia International: Dates: 14 November – 17 November; Host: Lusaka, Zambia; Venue: OYDC – National Sports Development Centre; Level: International Series; Prize: $5,000; Format: 32MS/16WS/16MD/8WD/16XD	(Azerbaijan) Era Maftuha	(Luxembourg) Kim Schmidt
11 November	Zambia International: Dates: 14 November – 17 November; Host: Lusaka, Zambia; Venue: OYDC – National Sports Development Centre; Level: International Series; Prize: $5,000; Format: 32MS/16WS/16MD/8WD/16XD	Score: 12–21, 21–13, 21–19	
11 November	Zambia International: Dates: 14 November – 17 November; Host: Lusaka, Zambia; Venue: OYDC – National Sports Development Centre; Level: International Series; Prize: $5,000; Format: 32MS/16WS/16MD/8WD/16XD	(Azerbaijan) Agil Gabilov (Azerbaijan) Dicky Dwi Pangestu	(Luxembourg) Yannick Feltes (Luxembourg) Jerome Pauquet
11 November	Zambia International: Dates: 14 November – 17 November; Host: Lusaka, Zambia; Venue: OYDC – National Sports Development Centre; Level: International Series; Prize: $5,000; Format: 32MS/16WS/16MD/8WD/16XD	Score: 21–11, 21–14	
11 November	Zambia International: Dates: 14 November – 17 November; Host: Lusaka, Zambia; Venue: OYDC – National Sports Development Centre; Level: International Series; Prize: $5,000; Format: 32MS/16WS/16MD/8WD/16XD	(Maldives) Aminath Nabeeha Abdul Razzaq (Maldives) Fathimath Nabaaha Abdul Razzaq	(Sri Lanka) Hasini Ambalangodage (Sri Lanka) Hasara Wijayarathne
11 November	Zambia International: Dates: 14 November – 17 November; Host: Lusaka, Zambia; Venue: OYDC – National Sports Development Centre; Level: International Series; Prize: $5,000; Format: 32MS/16WS/16MD/8WD/16XD	Score: 21–17, 21–19	
11 November	Zambia International: Dates: 14 November – 17 November; Host: Lusaka, Zambia; Venue: OYDC – National Sports Development Centre; Level: International Series; Prize: $5,000; Format: 32MS/16WS/16MD/8WD/16XD	(Azerbaijan) Agil Gabilov (Azerbaijan) Era Maftuha	(Azerbaijan) Jahid Alhasanov (Azerbaijan) Hajar Nuriyeva
11 November	Zambia International: Dates: 14 November – 17 November; Host: Lusaka, Zambia; Venue: OYDC – National Sports Development Centre; Level: International Series; Prize: $5,000; Format: 32MS/16WS/16MD/8WD/16XD	Score: 21–11, 17–21, 21–11	
18 November	China Masters (Draw): Date: 19 November – 24 November; Host: Shenzhen, China; Venue: Shenzhen Arena; Level: Super 750; Prize: $1,150,000; Format: 32MS/32WS/32MD/32WD/32XD	(Denmark) Anders Antonsen	(Indonesia) Jonatan Christie
18 November	China Masters (Draw): Date: 19 November – 24 November; Host: Shenzhen, China; Venue: Shenzhen Arena; Level: Super 750; Prize: $1,150,000; Format: 32MS/32WS/32MD/32WD/32XD	Score: 21–15, 21–13	
18 November	China Masters (Draw): Date: 19 November – 24 November; Host: Shenzhen, China; Venue: Shenzhen Arena; Level: Super 750; Prize: $1,150,000; Format: 32MS/32WS/32MD/32WD/32XD	(South Korea) An Se-young	(China) Gao Fangjie
18 November	China Masters (Draw): Date: 19 November – 24 November; Host: Shenzhen, China; Venue: Shenzhen Arena; Level: Super 750; Prize: $1,150,000; Format: 32MS/32WS/32MD/32WD/32XD	Score: 21–12, 21–8	
18 November	China Masters (Draw): Date: 19 November – 24 November; Host: Shenzhen, China; Venue: Shenzhen Arena; Level: Super 750; Prize: $1,150,000; Format: 32MS/32WS/32MD/32WD/32XD	(South Korea) Jin Yong (South Korea) Seo Seung-jae	(Indonesia) Sabar Karyaman Gutama (Indonesia) Muhammad Reza Pahlevi Isfahani
18 November	China Masters (Draw): Date: 19 November – 24 November; Host: Shenzhen, China; Venue: Shenzhen Arena; Level: Super 750; Prize: $1,150,000; Format: 32MS/32WS/32MD/32WD/32XD	Score: 21–16, 21–16	
18 November	China Masters (Draw): Date: 19 November – 24 November; Host: Shenzhen, China; Venue: Shenzhen Arena; Level: Super 750; Prize: $1,150,000; Format: 32MS/32WS/32MD/32WD/32XD	(China) Liu Shengshu (China) Tan Ning	(China) Li Yijing (China) Luo Xumin
18 November	China Masters (Draw): Date: 19 November – 24 November; Host: Shenzhen, China; Venue: Shenzhen Arena; Level: Super 750; Prize: $1,150,000; Format: 32MS/32WS/32MD/32WD/32XD	Score: 21–10, 21–10	
18 November	China Masters (Draw): Date: 19 November – 24 November; Host: Shenzhen, China; Venue: Shenzhen Arena; Level: Super 750; Prize: $1,150,000; Format: 32MS/32WS/32MD/32WD/32XD	(China) Feng Yanzhe (China) Huang Dongping	(Malaysia) Hoo Pang Ron (Malaysia) Cheng Su Yin
18 November	China Masters (Draw): Date: 19 November – 24 November; Host: Shenzhen, China; Venue: Shenzhen Arena; Level: Super 750; Prize: $1,150,000; Format: 32MS/32WS/32MD/32WD/32XD	Score: 21–23, 25–23, 21–16	
18 November	Vietnam International (Ninh Bình): Dates: 19 November – 24 November; Host: Ninh Bình, Vietnam; Venue: Ninh Bình Sports Stadium; Level: International Series; Prize: $5,000; Format: 64MS/32WS/32MD/32WD/32XD	(South Korea) Kim Byung-jae	(China) Liu Haichao
18 November	Vietnam International (Ninh Bình): Dates: 19 November – 24 November; Host: Ninh Bình, Vietnam; Venue: Ninh Bình Sports Stadium; Level: International Series; Prize: $5,000; Format: 64MS/32WS/32MD/32WD/32XD	Score: 21–19, 22–20	
18 November	Vietnam International (Ninh Bình): Dates: 19 November – 24 November; Host: Ninh Bình, Vietnam; Venue: Ninh Bình Sports Stadium; Level: International Series; Prize: $5,000; Format: 64MS/32WS/32MD/32WD/32XD	(Japan) Kana Furukawa	(South Korea) Kim Min-ji
18 November	Vietnam International (Ninh Bình): Dates: 19 November – 24 November; Host: Ninh Bình, Vietnam; Venue: Ninh Bình Sports Stadium; Level: International Series; Prize: $5,000; Format: 64MS/32WS/32MD/32WD/32XD	Score: 21–19, 21–7	
18 November	Vietnam International (Ninh Bình): Dates: 19 November – 24 November; Host: Ninh Bình, Vietnam; Venue: Ninh Bình Sports Stadium; Level: International Series; Prize: $5,000; Format: 64MS/32WS/32MD/32WD/32XD	(Chinese Taipei) He Zhi-wei (Chinese Taipei) Huang Jui-hsuan	(Malaysia) Muhammad Faiq (Malaysia) Lok Hong Quan
18 November	Vietnam International (Ninh Bình): Dates: 19 November – 24 November; Host: Ninh Bình, Vietnam; Venue: Ninh Bình Sports Stadium; Level: International Series; Prize: $5,000; Format: 64MS/32WS/32MD/32WD/32XD	Score: 21–19, 21–18	
18 November	Vietnam International (Ninh Bình): Dates: 19 November – 24 November; Host: Ninh Bình, Vietnam; Venue: Ninh Bình Sports Stadium; Level: International Series; Prize: $5,000; Format: 64MS/32WS/32MD/32WD/32XD	(China) Lin Fangling (China) Zhou Xinru	(China) Hu Shenhan (China) Luo Yi
18 November	Vietnam International (Ninh Bình): Dates: 19 November – 24 November; Host: Ninh Bình, Vietnam; Venue: Ninh Bình Sports Stadium; Level: International Series; Prize: $5,000; Format: 64MS/32WS/32MD/32WD/32XD	Score: 21–15, 21–12	
18 November	Vietnam International (Ninh Bình): Dates: 19 November – 24 November; Host: Ninh Bình, Vietnam; Venue: Ninh Bình Sports Stadium; Level: International Series; Prize: $5,000; Format: 64MS/32WS/32MD/32WD/32XD	(China) Shang Yichen (China) Lin Fangling	(Vietnam) Phạm Văn Hải (Vietnam) Thân Vân Anh
18 November	Vietnam International (Ninh Bình): Dates: 19 November – 24 November; Host: Ninh Bình, Vietnam; Venue: Ninh Bình Sports Stadium; Level: International Series; Prize: $5,000; Format: 64MS/32WS/32MD/32WD/32XD	Score: 21–13, 21–17	
18 November	Bahrain International (II): Dates: 19 November – 24 November; Host: Manama, Bahrain; Venue: The Bahrain Keraleeya Samajam; Level: International Series; Prize: $5,000; Format: 32MS/16WS/16MD/16WD/16XD	(India) Manraj Singh	(India) Kavin Thangam Kavin
18 November	Bahrain International (II): Dates: 19 November – 24 November; Host: Manama, Bahrain; Venue: The Bahrain Keraleeya Samajam; Level: International Series; Prize: $5,000; Format: 32MS/16WS/16MD/16WD/16XD	Score: 21–11, 21–14	
18 November	Bahrain International (II): Dates: 19 November – 24 November; Host: Manama, Bahrain; Venue: The Bahrain Keraleeya Samajam; Level: International Series; Prize: $5,000; Format: 32MS/16WS/16MD/16WD/16XD	(Japan) Nanami Someya	(Japan) Shiori Ebihara
18 November	Bahrain International (II): Dates: 19 November – 24 November; Host: Manama, Bahrain; Venue: The Bahrain Keraleeya Samajam; Level: International Series; Prize: $5,000; Format: 32MS/16WS/16MD/16WD/16XD	Score: 18–21, 21–18, 21–19	
18 November	Bahrain International (II): Dates: 19 November – 24 November; Host: Manama, Bahrain; Venue: The Bahrain Keraleeya Samajam; Level: International Series; Prize: $5,000; Format: 32MS/16WS/16MD/16WD/16XD	(Philippines) Christian Bernardo (Philippines) Alvin Morada	(India) Vimalraj Annadurai (India) Mauryan Kathiravan
18 November	Bahrain International (II): Dates: 19 November – 24 November; Host: Manama, Bahrain; Venue: The Bahrain Keraleeya Samajam; Level: International Series; Prize: $5,000; Format: 32MS/16WS/16MD/16WD/16XD	Score: 21–14, 21–15	
18 November	Bahrain International (II): Dates: 19 November – 24 November; Host: Manama, Bahrain; Venue: The Bahrain Keraleeya Samajam; Level: International Series; Prize: $5,000; Format: 32MS/16WS/16MD/16WD/16XD	(Bulgaria) Gabriela Stoeva (Bulgaria) Stefani Stoeva	(United Arab Emirates) Mysha Omer Khan (United Arab Emirates) Taabia Khan
18 November	Bahrain International (II): Dates: 19 November – 24 November; Host: Manama, Bahrain; Venue: The Bahrain Keraleeya Samajam; Level: International Series; Prize: $5,000; Format: 32MS/16WS/16MD/16WD/16XD	Score: 21–6, 21–8	
18 November	Bahrain International (II): Dates: 19 November – 24 November; Host: Manama, Bahrain; Venue: The Bahrain Keraleeya Samajam; Level: International Series; Prize: $5,000; Format: 32MS/16WS/16MD/16WD/16XD	(Kazakhstan) Dmitriy Panarin (Kazakhstan) Aisha Zhumabek	(India) Tarun Kona (India) Sri Krishna Priya Kudaravalli
18 November	Bahrain International (II): Dates: 19 November – 24 November; Host: Manama, Bahrain; Venue: The Bahrain Keraleeya Samajam; Level: International Series; Prize: $5,000; Format: 32MS/16WS/16MD/16WD/16XD	Score: 18–21, 21–18, 21–12	
18 November	Scottish Open: Dates: 21 November – 24 November; Host: Glasgow, Scotland; Venue: Emirates Arena; Level: International Challenge; Prize: $15,000; Format: 32MS/32WS/32MD/32WD/32XD	(Belgium) Julien Carraggi	(Netherlands) Joran Kweekel
18 November	Scottish Open: Dates: 21 November – 24 November; Host: Glasgow, Scotland; Venue: Emirates Arena; Level: International Challenge; Prize: $15,000; Format: 32MS/32WS/32MD/32WD/32XD	Score: 21–17, 18–21, 21–15	
18 November	Scottish Open: Dates: 21 November – 24 November; Host: Glasgow, Scotland; Venue: Emirates Arena; Level: International Challenge; Prize: $15,000; Format: 32MS/32WS/32MD/32WD/32XD	(Denmark) Julie Dawall Jakobsen	(Chinese Taipei) Huang Ching-ping
18 November	Scottish Open: Dates: 21 November – 24 November; Host: Glasgow, Scotland; Venue: Emirates Arena; Level: International Challenge; Prize: $15,000; Format: 32MS/32WS/32MD/32WD/32XD	Score: 21–19, 21–16	
18 November	Scottish Open: Dates: 21 November – 24 November; Host: Glasgow, Scotland; Venue: Emirates Arena; Level: International Challenge; Prize: $15,000; Format: 32MS/32WS/32MD/32WD/32XD	(Denmark) William Kryger Boe (Denmark) Christian Faust Kjær	(France) Éloi Adam (France) Léo Rossi
18 November	Scottish Open: Dates: 21 November – 24 November; Host: Glasgow, Scotland; Venue: Emirates Arena; Level: International Challenge; Prize: $15,000; Format: 32MS/32WS/32MD/32WD/32XD	Score: 9–21, 21–19, 21–17	
18 November	Scottish Open: Dates: 21 November – 24 November; Host: Glasgow, Scotland; Venue: Emirates Arena; Level: International Challenge; Prize: $15,000; Format: 32MS/32WS/32MD/32WD/32XD	(Netherlands) Debora Jille (Denmark) Sara Thygesen	(England) Chloe Birch (England) Estelle van Leeuwen
18 November	Scottish Open: Dates: 21 November – 24 November; Host: Glasgow, Scotland; Venue: Emirates Arena; Level: International Challenge; Prize: $15,000; Format: 32MS/32WS/32MD/32WD/32XD	Score: 21–14, 10–21, 21–8	
18 November	Scottish Open: Dates: 21 November – 24 November; Host: Glasgow, Scotland; Venue: Emirates Arena; Level: International Challenge; Prize: $15,000; Format: 32MS/32WS/32MD/32WD/32XD	(Scotland) Alexander Dunn (Scotland) Julie MacPherson	(Spain) Rubén García (Spain) Lucía Rodríguez
18 November	Scottish Open: Dates: 21 November – 24 November; Host: Glasgow, Scotland; Venue: Emirates Arena; Level: International Challenge; Prize: $15,000; Format: 32MS/32WS/32MD/32WD/32XD	Score: 23–21, 21–16	
18 November	Botswana International: Dates: 21 November – 24 November; Host: Otse, Botswana; Venue: Otse Police College Indoor Gymnasium; Level: Future Series; Format: 32MS/16WS/16MD/16WD/16XD	(Azerbaijan) Dicky Dwi Pangestu	(Zambia) Kalombo Mulenga
18 November	Botswana International: Dates: 21 November – 24 November; Host: Otse, Botswana; Venue: Otse Police College Indoor Gymnasium; Level: Future Series; Format: 32MS/16WS/16MD/16WD/16XD	Score: 21–13, 21–14	
18 November	Botswana International: Dates: 21 November – 24 November; Host: Otse, Botswana; Venue: Otse Police College Indoor Gymnasium; Level: Future Series; Format: 32MS/16WS/16MD/16WD/16XD	(Maldives) Fathimath Nabaaha Abdul Razzaq	(Maldives) Aminath Nabeeha Abdul Razzaq
18 November	Botswana International: Dates: 21 November – 24 November; Host: Otse, Botswana; Venue: Otse Police College Indoor Gymnasium; Level: Future Series; Format: 32MS/16WS/16MD/16WD/16XD	Score: 22–20, 14–21, 21–15	
18 November	Botswana International: Dates: 21 November – 24 November; Host: Otse, Botswana; Venue: Otse Police College Indoor Gymnasium; Level: Future Series; Format: 32MS/16WS/16MD/16WD/16XD	(Azerbaijan) Agil Gabilov (Azerbaijan) Dicky Dwi Pangestu	(Malta) Matthew Abela (Israel) Maxim Grinblat
18 November	Botswana International: Dates: 21 November – 24 November; Host: Otse, Botswana; Venue: Otse Police College Indoor Gymnasium; Level: Future Series; Format: 32MS/16WS/16MD/16WD/16XD	Score: 21–8, 21–15	
18 November	Botswana International: Dates: 21 November – 24 November; Host: Otse, Botswana; Venue: Otse Police College Indoor Gymnasium; Level: Future Series; Format: 32MS/16WS/16MD/16WD/16XD	(Sri Lanka) Hasini Ambalangodage (Sri Lanka) Hasara Wijayarathne	(South Africa) Amy Ackerman (South Africa) Deidre Laurens
18 November	Botswana International: Dates: 21 November – 24 November; Host: Otse, Botswana; Venue: Otse Police College Indoor Gymnasium; Level: Future Series; Format: 32MS/16WS/16MD/16WD/16XD	Score: 21–18, 22–20	
18 November	Botswana International: Dates: 21 November – 24 November; Host: Otse, Botswana; Venue: Otse Police College Indoor Gymnasium; Level: Future Series; Format: 32MS/16WS/16MD/16WD/16XD	(Azerbaijan) Agil Gabilov (Azerbaijan) Era Maftuha	(Maldives) Hussein Zayan Shaheed (Maldives) Fathimath Nabaaha Abdul Razzaq
18 November	Botswana International: Dates: 21 November – 24 November; Host: Otse, Botswana; Venue: Otse Police College Indoor Gymnasium; Level: Future Series; Format: 32MS/16WS/16MD/16WD/16XD	Score: 23–21, 21–18	
25 November	Syed Modi International (Draw): Date: 26 November – 1 December; Host: Lucknow, India; Venue: Babu Banarasi Das Indoor Stadium; Level: Super 300; Prize: $210,000; Format: 32MS/32WS/32MD/32WD/32XD	(India) Lakshya Sen	(Singapore) Jason Teh
25 November	Syed Modi International (Draw): Date: 26 November – 1 December; Host: Lucknow, India; Venue: Babu Banarasi Das Indoor Stadium; Level: Super 300; Prize: $210,000; Format: 32MS/32WS/32MD/32WD/32XD	Score: 21–6, 21–7	
25 November	Syed Modi International (Draw): Date: 26 November – 1 December; Host: Lucknow, India; Venue: Babu Banarasi Das Indoor Stadium; Level: Super 300; Prize: $210,000; Format: 32MS/32WS/32MD/32WD/32XD	(India) P. V. Sindhu	(China) Wu Luoyu
25 November	Syed Modi International (Draw): Date: 26 November – 1 December; Host: Lucknow, India; Venue: Babu Banarasi Das Indoor Stadium; Level: Super 300; Prize: $210,000; Format: 32MS/32WS/32MD/32WD/32XD	Score: 21–14, 21–16	
25 November	Syed Modi International (Draw): Date: 26 November – 1 December; Host: Lucknow, India; Venue: Babu Banarasi Das Indoor Stadium; Level: Super 300; Prize: $210,000; Format: 32MS/32WS/32MD/32WD/32XD	(China) Huang Di (China) Liu Yang	(India) Pruthvi Roy (India) K. Sai Pratheek
25 November	Syed Modi International (Draw): Date: 26 November – 1 December; Host: Lucknow, India; Venue: Babu Banarasi Das Indoor Stadium; Level: Super 300; Prize: $210,000; Format: 32MS/32WS/32MD/32WD/32XD	Score: 21–14, 19–21, 21–17	
25 November	Syed Modi International (Draw): Date: 26 November – 1 December; Host: Lucknow, India; Venue: Babu Banarasi Das Indoor Stadium; Level: Super 300; Prize: $210,000; Format: 32MS/32WS/32MD/32WD/32XD	(India) Treesa Jolly (India) Gayatri Gopichand	(China) Bao Lijing (China) Li Qian
25 November	Syed Modi International (Draw): Date: 26 November – 1 December; Host: Lucknow, India; Venue: Babu Banarasi Das Indoor Stadium; Level: Super 300; Prize: $210,000; Format: 32MS/32WS/32MD/32WD/32XD	Score: 21–18, 21–11	
25 November	Syed Modi International (Draw): Date: 26 November – 1 December; Host: Lucknow, India; Venue: Babu Banarasi Das Indoor Stadium; Level: Super 300; Prize: $210,000; Format: 32MS/32WS/32MD/32WD/32XD	(Thailand) Dechapol Puavaranukroh (Thailand) Supissara Paewsampran	(India) Dhruv Kapila (India) Tanisha Crasto
25 November	Syed Modi International (Draw): Date: 26 November – 1 December; Host: Lucknow, India; Venue: Babu Banarasi Das Indoor Stadium; Level: Super 300; Prize: $210,000; Format: 32MS/32WS/32MD/32WD/32XD	Score: 18–21, 21–14, 21–8	
25 November	Welsh International: Dates: 26 November – 30 November; Host: Cardiff, Wales; Venue: Sport Wales National Centre; Level: International Series; Prize: $5,000; Format: 32MS/32WS/32MD/32WD/32XD	(Australia) Karono	(England) Ethan Rose
25 November	Welsh International: Dates: 26 November – 30 November; Host: Cardiff, Wales; Venue: Sport Wales National Centre; Level: International Series; Prize: $5,000; Format: 32MS/32WS/32MD/32WD/32XD	Score: 21–10, 21–14	
25 November	Welsh International: Dates: 26 November – 30 November; Host: Cardiff, Wales; Venue: Sport Wales National Centre; Level: International Series; Prize: $5,000; Format: 32MS/32WS/32MD/32WD/32XD	(Chinese Taipei) Huang Ching-ping	(Chinese Taipei) Huang Yu-wei
25 November	Welsh International: Dates: 26 November – 30 November; Host: Cardiff, Wales; Venue: Sport Wales National Centre; Level: International Series; Prize: $5,000; Format: 32MS/32WS/32MD/32WD/32XD	Score: Walkover	
25 November	Welsh International: Dates: 26 November – 30 November; Host: Cardiff, Wales; Venue: Sport Wales National Centre; Level: International Series; Prize: $5,000; Format: 32MS/32WS/32MD/32WD/32XD	(England) Oliver Butler (England) Samuel Jones	(England) Chua Yue Chern (England) Koon Fung Kelvin Ho
25 November	Welsh International: Dates: 26 November – 30 November; Host: Cardiff, Wales; Venue: Sport Wales National Centre; Level: International Series; Prize: $5,000; Format: 32MS/32WS/32MD/32WD/32XD	Score: 21–14, 21–17	
25 November	Welsh International: Dates: 26 November – 30 November; Host: Cardiff, Wales; Venue: Sport Wales National Centre; Level: International Series; Prize: $5,000; Format: 32MS/32WS/32MD/32WD/32XD	(Spain) Paula López (Spain) Lucía Rodríguez	(Australia) Nozomi Shimizu (Netherlands) Iris van Leijsen
25 November	Welsh International: Dates: 26 November – 30 November; Host: Cardiff, Wales; Venue: Sport Wales National Centre; Level: International Series; Prize: $5,000; Format: 32MS/32WS/32MD/32WD/32XD	Score: 21–17, 21–18	
25 November	Welsh International: Dates: 26 November – 30 November; Host: Cardiff, Wales; Venue: Sport Wales National Centre; Level: International Series; Prize: $5,000; Format: 32MS/32WS/32MD/32WD/32XD	(Spain) Rubén García (Spain) Lucía Rodríguez	(Republic of Ireland) Joshua Magee (Republic of Ireland) Moya Ryan
25 November	Welsh International: Dates: 26 November – 30 November; Host: Cardiff, Wales; Venue: Sport Wales National Centre; Level: International Series; Prize: $5,000; Format: 32MS/32WS/32MD/32WD/32XD	Score: 21–13, 21–11	
25 November	El Salvador International: Dates: 26 November – 30 November; Host: San Salvador, El Salvador; Venue: Coliseo de Bádminton “El Polvorín”; Level: International Series; Prize: $5,000; Format: 32MS/32WS/16MD/16WD/32XD	(United States) Mark Shelley Alcala	(El Salvador) Uriel Canjura
25 November	El Salvador International: Dates: 26 November – 30 November; Host: San Salvador, El Salvador; Venue: Coliseo de Bádminton “El Polvorín”; Level: International Series; Prize: $5,000; Format: 32MS/32WS/16MD/16WD/32XD	Score: 21–14, 23–21	
25 November	El Salvador International: Dates: 26 November – 30 November; Host: San Salvador, El Salvador; Venue: Coliseo de Bádminton “El Polvorín”; Level: International Series; Prize: $5,000; Format: 32MS/32WS/16MD/16WD/32XD	(Brazil) Juliana Viana Vieira	(Ukraine) Yevheniia Kantemyr
25 November	El Salvador International: Dates: 26 November – 30 November; Host: San Salvador, El Salvador; Venue: Coliseo de Bádminton “El Polvorín”; Level: International Series; Prize: $5,000; Format: 32MS/32WS/16MD/16WD/32XD	Score: 21–10, 21–14	
25 November	El Salvador International: Dates: 26 November – 30 November; Host: San Salvador, El Salvador; Venue: Coliseo de Bádminton “El Polvorín”; Level: International Series; Prize: $5,000; Format: 32MS/32WS/16MD/16WD/32XD	(Brazil) Fabrício Farias (Brazil) Davi Silva	(Brazil) João Mendonça (Brazil) Kauan Figueroa Sttocco
25 November	El Salvador International: Dates: 26 November – 30 November; Host: San Salvador, El Salvador; Venue: Coliseo de Bádminton “El Polvorín”; Level: International Series; Prize: $5,000; Format: 32MS/32WS/16MD/16WD/32XD	Score: 21–14, 21–15	
25 November	El Salvador International: Dates: 26 November – 30 November; Host: San Salvador, El Salvador; Venue: Coliseo de Bádminton “El Polvorín”; Level: International Series; Prize: $5,000; Format: 32MS/32WS/16MD/16WD/32XD	(Brazil) Jaqueline Lima (Brazil) Sâmia Lima	(Guatemala) Diana Corleto (Guatemala) Nikté Sotomayor
25 November	El Salvador International: Dates: 26 November – 30 November; Host: San Salvador, El Salvador; Venue: Coliseo de Bádminton “El Polvorín”; Level: International Series; Prize: $5,000; Format: 32MS/32WS/16MD/16WD/32XD	Score: 21–19, 21–12	
25 November	El Salvador International: Dates: 26 November – 30 November; Host: San Salvador, El Salvador; Venue: Coliseo de Bádminton “El Polvorín”; Level: International Series; Prize: $5,000; Format: 32MS/32WS/16MD/16WD/32XD	(Brazil) Davi Silva (Brazil) Sania Lima	(Brazil) Fabrício Farias (Brazil) Jaqueline Lima
25 November	El Salvador International: Dates: 26 November – 30 November; Host: San Salvador, El Salvador; Venue: Coliseo de Bádminton “El Polvorín”; Level: International Series; Prize: $5,000; Format: 32MS/32WS/16MD/16WD/32XD	Score: 26–24, 15–21, 21–19	
25 November	South Africa International: Dates: 28 November – 1 December; Host: Cape Town, South Africa; Venue: John Tyers Hall; Level: Future Series; Format: 32MS/32WS/32MD/16WD/32XD	(England) Ben Hammond	(Mauritius) Lucas Douce
25 November	South Africa International: Dates: 28 November – 1 December; Host: Cape Town, South Africa; Venue: John Tyers Hall; Level: Future Series; Format: 32MS/32WS/32MD/16WD/32XD	Score: 21–18, 21–12	
25 November	South Africa International: Dates: 28 November – 1 December; Host: Cape Town, South Africa; Venue: John Tyers Hall; Level: Future Series; Format: 32MS/32WS/32MD/16WD/32XD	(South Africa) Johanita Scholtz	(Italy) Gianna Stiglich
25 November	South Africa International: Dates: 28 November – 1 December; Host: Cape Town, South Africa; Venue: John Tyers Hall; Level: Future Series; Format: 32MS/32WS/32MD/16WD/32XD	Score: 21–14 retired	
25 November	South Africa International: Dates: 28 November – 1 December; Host: Cape Town, South Africa; Venue: John Tyers Hall; Level: Future Series; Format: 32MS/32WS/32MD/16WD/32XD	(Malta) Matthew Abela (Israel) Maxim Grinblat	(South Africa) Dorian James (South Africa) Robert Summers
25 November	South Africa International: Dates: 28 November – 1 December; Host: Cape Town, South Africa; Venue: John Tyers Hall; Level: Future Series; Format: 32MS/32WS/32MD/16WD/32XD	Score: 10–21, 21–19, 22–20	
25 November	South Africa International: Dates: 28 November – 1 December; Host: Cape Town, South Africa; Venue: John Tyers Hall; Level: Future Series; Format: 32MS/32WS/32MD/16WD/32XD	(South Africa) Amy Ackerman (South Africa) Deidre Laurens	(Sri Lanka) Hasini Ambalangodage (Sri Lanka) Hasara Wijayarathne
25 November	South Africa International: Dates: 28 November – 1 December; Host: Cape Town, South Africa; Venue: John Tyers Hall; Level: Future Series; Format: 32MS/32WS/32MD/16WD/32XD	Score: 21–14, 21–14	
25 November	South Africa International: Dates: 28 November – 1 December; Host: Cape Town, South Africa; Venue: John Tyers Hall; Level: Future Series; Format: 32MS/32WS/32MD/16WD/32XD	(South Africa) Caden Kakora (South Africa) Johanita Scholtz	(South Africa) Robert Summers (South Africa) Anri Schoonees
25 November	South Africa International: Dates: 28 November – 1 December; Host: Cape Town, South Africa; Venue: John Tyers Hall; Level: Future Series; Format: 32MS/32WS/32MD/16WD/32XD	Score: 21–12, 23–21	

=== December ===
Week commencing	Tournament	Champions	Runners-up
2 December	Guwahati Masters (Draw): Date: 3 December – 8 December; Host: Guwahati, India; Venue: Saru Sajai Indoor Sports Complex; Level: Super 100; Prize: $100,000; Format: 48MS/32WS/32MD/32WD/32XD	(India) Sathish Karunakaran	(China) Zhu Xuanchen
2 December	Guwahati Masters (Draw): Date: 3 December – 8 December; Host: Guwahati, India; Venue: Saru Sajai Indoor Sports Complex; Level: Super 100; Prize: $100,000; Format: 48MS/32WS/32MD/32WD/32XD	Score: 21–17, 21–14	
2 December	Guwahati Masters (Draw): Date: 3 December – 8 December; Host: Guwahati, India; Venue: Saru Sajai Indoor Sports Complex; Level: Super 100; Prize: $100,000; Format: 48MS/32WS/32MD/32WD/32XD	(China) Cai Yanyan	(India) Anmol Kharb
2 December	Guwahati Masters (Draw): Date: 3 December – 8 December; Host: Guwahati, India; Venue: Saru Sajai Indoor Sports Complex; Level: Super 100; Prize: $100,000; Format: 48MS/32WS/32MD/32WD/32XD	Score: 14–21, 21–13, 21–19	
2 December	Guwahati Masters (Draw): Date: 3 December – 8 December; Host: Guwahati, India; Venue: Saru Sajai Indoor Sports Complex; Level: Super 100; Prize: $100,000; Format: 48MS/32WS/32MD/32WD/32XD	(Malaysia) Chia Wei Jie (Malaysia) Lwi Sheng Hao	(China) Huang Di (China) Liu Yang
2 December	Guwahati Masters (Draw): Date: 3 December – 8 December; Host: Guwahati, India; Venue: Saru Sajai Indoor Sports Complex; Level: Super 100; Prize: $100,000; Format: 48MS/32WS/32MD/32WD/32XD	Score: 20–22, 21–15, 21–17	
2 December	Guwahati Masters (Draw): Date: 3 December – 8 December; Host: Guwahati, India; Venue: Saru Sajai Indoor Sports Complex; Level: Super 100; Prize: $100,000; Format: 48MS/32WS/32MD/32WD/32XD	(India) Tanisha Crasto (India) Ashwini Ponnappa	(China) Li Huazhou (China) Wang Zimeng
2 December	Guwahati Masters (Draw): Date: 3 December – 8 December; Host: Guwahati, India; Venue: Saru Sajai Indoor Sports Complex; Level: Super 100; Prize: $100,000; Format: 48MS/32WS/32MD/32WD/32XD	Score: 21–18, 21–12	
2 December	Guwahati Masters (Draw): Date: 3 December – 8 December; Host: Guwahati, India; Venue: Saru Sajai Indoor Sports Complex; Level: Super 100; Prize: $100,000; Format: 48MS/32WS/32MD/32WD/32XD	(China) Zhang Hanyu (China) Bao Lijing	(England) Rory Easton (England) Lizzie Tolman
2 December	Guwahati Masters (Draw): Date: 3 December – 8 December; Host: Guwahati, India; Venue: Saru Sajai Indoor Sports Complex; Level: Super 100; Prize: $100,000; Format: 48MS/32WS/32MD/32WD/32XD	Score: 21–15, 21–16	
2 December	Canadian International: Dates: 3 December – 8 December; Host: Ontario, Canada; Venue: Markham Pan Am Centre; Level: International Challenge; Prize: $15,000; Format: 64MS/64WS/32MD/16WD/32XD	(Canada) Brian Yang	(Canada) Victor Lai
2 December	Canadian International: Dates: 3 December – 8 December; Host: Ontario, Canada; Venue: Markham Pan Am Centre; Level: International Challenge; Prize: $15,000; Format: 64MS/64WS/32MD/16WD/32XD	Score: 21–14, 21–8	
2 December	Canadian International: Dates: 3 December – 8 December; Host: Ontario, Canada; Venue: Markham Pan Am Centre; Level: International Challenge; Prize: $15,000; Format: 64MS/64WS/32MD/16WD/32XD	(Brazil) Juliana Viana Vieira	(Canada) Michelle Li
2 December	Canadian International: Dates: 3 December – 8 December; Host: Ontario, Canada; Venue: Markham Pan Am Centre; Level: International Challenge; Prize: $15,000; Format: 64MS/64WS/32MD/16WD/32XD	Score: 21–18, 14–21, 21–17	
2 December	Canadian International: Dates: 3 December – 8 December; Host: Ontario, Canada; Venue: Markham Pan Am Centre; Level: International Challenge; Prize: $15,000; Format: 64MS/64WS/32MD/16WD/32XD	(United States) Chen Zhi-yi (United States) Presley Smith	(Canada) Kevin Lee (Canada) Ty Alexander Lindeman
2 December	Canadian International: Dates: 3 December – 8 December; Host: Ontario, Canada; Venue: Markham Pan Am Centre; Level: International Challenge; Prize: $15,000; Format: 64MS/64WS/32MD/16WD/32XD	Score: 21–11, 21–9	
2 December	Canadian International: Dates: 3 December – 8 December; Host: Ontario, Canada; Venue: Markham Pan Am Centre; Level: International Challenge; Prize: $15,000; Format: 64MS/64WS/32MD/16WD/32XD	(Chinese Taipei) Lin Wan-ching (Chinese Taipei) Liu Chiao-yun	(Canada) Jacqueline Cheung (Canada) Catherine Choi
2 December	Canadian International: Dates: 3 December – 8 December; Host: Ontario, Canada; Venue: Markham Pan Am Centre; Level: International Challenge; Prize: $15,000; Format: 64MS/64WS/32MD/16WD/32XD	Score: 21–18, 21–8	
2 December	Canadian International: Dates: 3 December – 8 December; Host: Ontario, Canada; Venue: Markham Pan Am Centre; Level: International Challenge; Prize: $15,000; Format: 64MS/64WS/32MD/16WD/32XD	(Brazil) Fabrício Farias (Brazil) Jaqueline Lima	(Brazil) Davi Silva (Brazil) Sania Lima
2 December	Canadian International: Dates: 3 December – 8 December; Host: Ontario, Canada; Venue: Markham Pan Am Centre; Level: International Challenge; Prize: $15,000; Format: 64MS/64WS/32MD/16WD/32XD	Score: 21–16, 21–19	
2 December	Thailand International: Dates: 3 December – 8 December; Host: Nakhon Ratchasima, Thailand; Venue: Terminal 21 Korat; Level: International Series; Prize: $5,000; Format: 64MS/64WS/32MD/32WD/32XD	(South Korea) Jeon Hyeok-jin	(South Korea) Son Wan-ho
2 December	Thailand International: Dates: 3 December – 8 December; Host: Nakhon Ratchasima, Thailand; Venue: Terminal 21 Korat; Level: International Series; Prize: $5,000; Format: 64MS/64WS/32MD/32WD/32XD	Score: 21–8, 6–0 retired	
2 December	Thailand International: Dates: 3 December – 8 December; Host: Nakhon Ratchasima, Thailand; Venue: Terminal 21 Korat; Level: International Series; Prize: $5,000; Format: 64MS/64WS/32MD/32WD/32XD	(Thailand) Tidapron Kleebyeesun	(Malaysia) Loh Zhi Wei
2 December	Thailand International: Dates: 3 December – 8 December; Host: Nakhon Ratchasima, Thailand; Venue: Terminal 21 Korat; Level: International Series; Prize: $5,000; Format: 64MS/64WS/32MD/32WD/32XD	Score: 21–15, 21–6	
2 December	Thailand International: Dates: 3 December – 8 December; Host: Nakhon Ratchasima, Thailand; Venue: Terminal 21 Korat; Level: International Series; Prize: $5,000; Format: 64MS/64WS/32MD/32WD/32XD	(South Korea) Choi Sol-gyu (South Korea) Lim Su-min	(Thailand) Thanawin Madee (Thailand) Wachirawit Sothon
2 December	Thailand International: Dates: 3 December – 8 December; Host: Nakhon Ratchasima, Thailand; Venue: Terminal 21 Korat; Level: International Series; Prize: $5,000; Format: 64MS/64WS/32MD/32WD/32XD	Score: 17–21, 21–18, 21–15	
2 December	Thailand International: Dates: 3 December – 8 December; Host: Nakhon Ratchasima, Thailand; Venue: Terminal 21 Korat; Level: International Series; Prize: $5,000; Format: 64MS/64WS/32MD/32WD/32XD	(Thailand) Tidapron Kleebyeesun (Thailand) Nattamon Laisuan	(Chinese Taipei) Chen Yu-hsuan (Chinese Taipei) Chen Yu-tong
2 December	Thailand International: Dates: 3 December – 8 December; Host: Nakhon Ratchasima, Thailand; Venue: Terminal 21 Korat; Level: International Series; Prize: $5,000; Format: 64MS/64WS/32MD/32WD/32XD	Score: 21–18, 21–23, 21–16	
2 December	Thailand International: Dates: 3 December – 8 December; Host: Nakhon Ratchasima, Thailand; Venue: Terminal 21 Korat; Level: International Series; Prize: $5,000; Format: 64MS/64WS/32MD/32WD/32XD	(Thailand) Phuwanat Horbanluekit (Thailand) Fungfa Korpthammakit	(Thailand) Neuaduang Mangkornloi (Thailand) Worakorn Chitcharoen
2 December	Thailand International: Dates: 3 December – 8 December; Host: Nakhon Ratchasima, Thailand; Venue: Terminal 21 Korat; Level: International Series; Prize: $5,000; Format: 64MS/64WS/32MD/32WD/32XD	Score: 21–13, 21–12	
9 December	BWF World Tour Finals (Draw): Date: 11–15 December; Host: Hangzhou, China; Venue: Hangzhou Olympic Sports Center; Level: World Tour Finals; Prize: $2,500,000; Format: 8MS/8WS/8MD/8WD/8XD	(China) Shi Yuqi	(Denmark) Anders Antonsen
9 December	BWF World Tour Finals (Draw): Date: 11–15 December; Host: Hangzhou, China; Venue: Hangzhou Olympic Sports Center; Level: World Tour Finals; Prize: $2,500,000; Format: 8MS/8WS/8MD/8WD/8XD	Score: 21–18, 21–14	
9 December	BWF World Tour Finals (Draw): Date: 11–15 December; Host: Hangzhou, China; Venue: Hangzhou Olympic Sports Center; Level: World Tour Finals; Prize: $2,500,000; Format: 8MS/8WS/8MD/8WD/8XD	(China) Wang Zhiyi	(China) Han Yue
9 December	BWF World Tour Finals (Draw): Date: 11–15 December; Host: Hangzhou, China; Venue: Hangzhou Olympic Sports Center; Level: World Tour Finals; Prize: $2,500,000; Format: 8MS/8WS/8MD/8WD/8XD	Score: 19–21, 21–19, 21–11	
9 December	BWF World Tour Finals (Draw): Date: 11–15 December; Host: Hangzhou, China; Venue: Hangzhou Olympic Sports Center; Level: World Tour Finals; Prize: $2,500,000; Format: 8MS/8WS/8MD/8WD/8XD	(Denmark) Kim Astrup (Denmark) Anders Skaarup Rasmussen	(Malaysia) Goh Sze Fei (Malaysia) Nur Izzuddin
9 December	BWF World Tour Finals (Draw): Date: 11–15 December; Host: Hangzhou, China; Venue: Hangzhou Olympic Sports Center; Level: World Tour Finals; Prize: $2,500,000; Format: 8MS/8WS/8MD/8WD/8XD	Score: 21–17, 17–21, 21–11	
9 December	BWF World Tour Finals (Draw): Date: 11–15 December; Host: Hangzhou, China; Venue: Hangzhou Olympic Sports Center; Level: World Tour Finals; Prize: $2,500,000; Format: 8MS/8WS/8MD/8WD/8XD	(South Korea) Baek Ha-na (South Korea) Lee So-hee	(Japan) Nami Matsuyama (Japan) Chiharu Shida
9 December	BWF World Tour Finals (Draw): Date: 11–15 December; Host: Hangzhou, China; Venue: Hangzhou Olympic Sports Center; Level: World Tour Finals; Prize: $2,500,000; Format: 8MS/8WS/8MD/8WD/8XD	Score: 21–19, 21–14	
9 December	BWF World Tour Finals (Draw): Date: 11–15 December; Host: Hangzhou, China; Venue: Hangzhou Olympic Sports Center; Level: World Tour Finals; Prize: $2,500,000; Format: 8MS/8WS/8MD/8WD/8XD	(China) Zheng Siwei (China) Huang Yaqiong	(Malaysia) Chen Tang Jie (Malaysia) Toh Ee Wei
9 December	BWF World Tour Finals (Draw): Date: 11–15 December; Host: Hangzhou, China; Venue: Hangzhou Olympic Sports Center; Level: World Tour Finals; Prize: $2,500,000; Format: 8MS/8WS/8MD/8WD/8XD	Score: 21–18, 14–21, 21–17	
9 December	Odisha Masters (Draw): Date: 10–15 December; Host: Cuttack, Odisha, India; Venue: Jawaharlal Nehru Stadium; Level: Super 100; Prize: $100,000; Format: 48MS/32WS/32MD/32WD/32XD	(India) Rithvik Sanjeevi	(India) Tharun Mannepalli
9 December	Odisha Masters (Draw): Date: 10–15 December; Host: Cuttack, Odisha, India; Venue: Jawaharlal Nehru Stadium; Level: Super 100; Prize: $100,000; Format: 48MS/32WS/32MD/32WD/32XD	Score: 21–18, 21–16	
9 December	Odisha Masters (Draw): Date: 10–15 December; Host: Cuttack, Odisha, India; Venue: Jawaharlal Nehru Stadium; Level: Super 100; Prize: $100,000; Format: 48MS/32WS/32MD/32WD/32XD	(China) Cai Yanyan	(India) Tanvi Sharma
9 December	Odisha Masters (Draw): Date: 10–15 December; Host: Cuttack, Odisha, India; Venue: Jawaharlal Nehru Stadium; Level: Super 100; Prize: $100,000; Format: 48MS/32WS/32MD/32WD/32XD	Score: 21–14, 21–16	
9 December	Odisha Masters (Draw): Date: 10–15 December; Host: Cuttack, Odisha, India; Venue: Jawaharlal Nehru Stadium; Level: Super 100; Prize: $100,000; Format: 48MS/32WS/32MD/32WD/32XD	(China) Huang Di (China) Liu Yang	(Japan) Kakeru Kumagai (Japan) Hiroki Nishi
9 December	Odisha Masters (Draw): Date: 10–15 December; Host: Cuttack, Odisha, India; Venue: Jawaharlal Nehru Stadium; Level: Super 100; Prize: $100,000; Format: 48MS/32WS/32MD/32WD/32XD	Score: 21–13, 19–21, 27–25	
9 December	Odisha Masters (Draw): Date: 10–15 December; Host: Cuttack, Odisha, India; Venue: Jawaharlal Nehru Stadium; Level: Super 100; Prize: $100,000; Format: 48MS/32WS/32MD/32WD/32XD	(Japan) Nanako Hara (Japan) Riko Kiyose	(China) Keng Shuliang (China) Wang Tingge
9 December	Odisha Masters (Draw): Date: 10–15 December; Host: Cuttack, Odisha, India; Venue: Jawaharlal Nehru Stadium; Level: Super 100; Prize: $100,000; Format: 48MS/32WS/32MD/32WD/32XD	Score: 21–11, 21–19	
9 December	Odisha Masters (Draw): Date: 10–15 December; Host: Cuttack, Odisha, India; Venue: Jawaharlal Nehru Stadium; Level: Super 100; Prize: $100,000; Format: 48MS/32WS/32MD/32WD/32XD	(China) Gao Jiaxuan (China) Tang Ruizhi	(Singapore) Terry Hee (Singapore) Jin Yujia
9 December	Odisha Masters (Draw): Date: 10–15 December; Host: Cuttack, Odisha, India; Venue: Jawaharlal Nehru Stadium; Level: Super 100; Prize: $100,000; Format: 48MS/32WS/32MD/32WD/32XD	Score: 15–21, 21–15, 21–15	
16 December	Bangladesh International: Dates: 17 December – 21 December; Host: Dhaka, Bangladesh; Venue: Shaheed Tajuddin Ahmed Indoor Stadium; Level: International Challenge; Prize: $15,000; Format: 64MS/32WS/32MD/16WD/16XD	(Sri Lanka) Viren Nettasinghe	(Canada) Xiaodong Sheng
16 December	Bangladesh International: Dates: 17 December – 21 December; Host: Dhaka, Bangladesh; Venue: Shaheed Tajuddin Ahmed Indoor Stadium; Level: International Challenge; Prize: $15,000; Format: 64MS/32WS/32MD/16WD/16XD	Score: 21–12, 21–17	
16 December	Bangladesh International: Dates: 17 December – 21 December; Host: Dhaka, Bangladesh; Venue: Shaheed Tajuddin Ahmed Indoor Stadium; Level: International Challenge; Prize: $15,000; Format: 64MS/32WS/32MD/16WD/16XD	(Ukraine) Polina Buhrova	(Thailand) Lalinrat Chaiwan
16 December	Bangladesh International: Dates: 17 December – 21 December; Host: Dhaka, Bangladesh; Venue: Shaheed Tajuddin Ahmed Indoor Stadium; Level: International Challenge; Prize: $15,000; Format: 64MS/32WS/32MD/16WD/16XD	Score: 21–19, 21–19	
16 December	Bangladesh International: Dates: 17 December – 21 December; Host: Dhaka, Bangladesh; Venue: Shaheed Tajuddin Ahmed Indoor Stadium; Level: International Challenge; Prize: $15,000; Format: 64MS/32WS/32MD/16WD/16XD	(Malaysia) Lau Yi Sheng (Malaysia) Lee Yi Bo	(Indonesia) Muhammad Baqir Al Hanif (Indonesia) Ali Faathir Rayhan
16 December	Bangladesh International: Dates: 17 December – 21 December; Host: Dhaka, Bangladesh; Venue: Shaheed Tajuddin Ahmed Indoor Stadium; Level: International Challenge; Prize: $15,000; Format: 64MS/32WS/32MD/16WD/16XD	Score: 17–21, 21–15, 21–17	
16 December	Bangladesh International: Dates: 17 December – 21 December; Host: Dhaka, Bangladesh; Venue: Shaheed Tajuddin Ahmed Indoor Stadium; Level: International Challenge; Prize: $15,000; Format: 64MS/32WS/32MD/16WD/16XD	(Thailand) Kodchaporn Chaichana (Thailand) Pannawee Polyiam	(Ukraine) Polina Buhrova (Ukraine) Yevheniia Kantemyr
16 December	Bangladesh International: Dates: 17 December – 21 December; Host: Dhaka, Bangladesh; Venue: Shaheed Tajuddin Ahmed Indoor Stadium; Level: International Challenge; Prize: $15,000; Format: 64MS/32WS/32MD/16WD/16XD	Score: 25–23, 18–21, 21–11	
16 December	Bangladesh International: Dates: 17 December – 21 December; Host: Dhaka, Bangladesh; Venue: Shaheed Tajuddin Ahmed Indoor Stadium; Level: International Challenge; Prize: $15,000; Format: 64MS/32WS/32MD/16WD/16XD	(Singapore) Terry Hee (Singapore) Jin Yujia	(India) Bokka Navaneeth (India) Ritika Thaker
16 December	Bangladesh International: Dates: 17 December – 21 December; Host: Dhaka, Bangladesh; Venue: Shaheed Tajuddin Ahmed Indoor Stadium; Level: International Challenge; Prize: $15,000; Format: 64MS/32WS/32MD/16WD/16XD	Score: 21–14, 21–16	
23 December	Nepal International: Dates: 23 December – 26 December; Host: Tripureshwor, Nepal; Venue: Dasharath Rangasala; Level: International Challenge; Prize: $15,000; Format: 32MS/32WS/32MD/16WD/32XD	(India) Meiraba Maisnam	(India) B. M. Rahul Bharadwaj
23 December	Nepal International: Dates: 23 December – 26 December; Host: Tripureshwor, Nepal; Venue: Dasharath Rangasala; Level: International Challenge; Prize: $15,000; Format: 32MS/32WS/32MD/16WD/32XD	Score: 21–17, 21–16	
23 December	Nepal International: Dates: 23 December – 26 December; Host: Tripureshwor, Nepal; Venue: Dasharath Rangasala; Level: International Challenge; Prize: $15,000; Format: 32MS/32WS/32MD/16WD/32XD	(Thailand) Lalinrat Chaiwan	(India) Ira Sharma
23 December	Nepal International: Dates: 23 December – 26 December; Host: Tripureshwor, Nepal; Venue: Dasharath Rangasala; Level: International Challenge; Prize: $15,000; Format: 32MS/32WS/32MD/16WD/32XD	Score: 22–20, 21–12	
23 December	Nepal International: Dates: 23 December – 26 December; Host: Tripureshwor, Nepal; Venue: Dasharath Rangasala; Level: International Challenge; Prize: $15,000; Format: 32MS/32WS/32MD/16WD/32XD	(Malaysia) Lau Yi Sheng (Malaysia) Lee Yi Bo	(India) Chayanit Joshi (India) Mayank Rana
23 December	Nepal International: Dates: 23 December – 26 December; Host: Tripureshwor, Nepal; Venue: Dasharath Rangasala; Level: International Challenge; Prize: $15,000; Format: 32MS/32WS/32MD/16WD/32XD	Score: 21–14, 21–23, 21–17	
23 December	Nepal International: Dates: 23 December – 26 December; Host: Tripureshwor, Nepal; Venue: Dasharath Rangasala; Level: International Challenge; Prize: $15,000; Format: 32MS/32WS/32MD/16WD/32XD	(Malaysia) Kisona Selvaduray (Malaysia) Yap Rui Chen	(Thailand) Kodchaporn Chaichana (Thailand) Pannawee Polyiam
23 December	Nepal International: Dates: 23 December – 26 December; Host: Tripureshwor, Nepal; Venue: Dasharath Rangasala; Level: International Challenge; Prize: $15,000; Format: 32MS/32WS/32MD/16WD/32XD	Score: 21–13, 21–4	
23 December	Nepal International: Dates: 23 December – 26 December; Host: Tripureshwor, Nepal; Venue: Dasharath Rangasala; Level: International Challenge; Prize: $15,000; Format: 32MS/32WS/32MD/16WD/32XD	(Malaysia) Lau Yi Sheng (Malaysia) Yap Rui Chen	(Thailand) Nontakorn Thong-On (Thailand) Kodchaporn Chaichana
23 December	Nepal International: Dates: 23 December – 26 December; Host: Tripureshwor, Nepal; Venue: Dasharath Rangasala; Level: International Challenge; Prize: $15,000; Format: 32MS/32WS/32MD/16WD/32XD	Score: 21–18, 21–11	

== Retirements ==
Following is a list of notable players (winners of the main tour title, and/or part of the BWF Rankings top 100 for at least one week) who announced their retirement from professional badminton, during the 2024 season:

- B. Sai Praneeth (born 10 August 1992 in Hyderabad, Telangana, India) reached a career-high ranking of no. 10 in the men's singles on 12 November 2019. He announced his retirement on 4 March 2024. The 2023 Guwahati Masters was his last tournament.
- Marcus Fernaldi Gideon (born 9 March 1991 in Jakarta, Indonesia) reached a career-high ranking of no. 1 in the men's doubles on 16 March 2017. He announced his retirement on 9 March 2024. The 2023 Guwahati Masters was his last tournament.
- Takuto Inoue (born 26 February 1995 in Genkai, Saga, Japan) reached a career-high ranking of No. 7 in men's doubles on 12 July 2018. The BIPROGY badminton team announced Inoue's retirement on 1 April 2024. The 2023 Malaysia International was his last tournament.
- Kento Momota (born 1 September 1994 in Mino, Kagawa, Japan) reached a career-high ranking of no. 1 in the men's singles on 27 September 2018. He announced his retirement on 2 May 2024. He was a 2-time World Champion. The 2024 Thomas Cup was his last tournament.
- Ribka Sugiarto (born 22 January 2000 in Karanganyar, Indonesia) reached a career-high ranking of no. 25 in the women's doubles on 10 October 2023. She announced her retirement on 10 May 2024. The 2024 Uber Cup was her last tournament.
- Kevin Sanjaya Sukamuljo (born 2 August 1995 in Banyuwangi, Indonesia) reached a career-high ranking of no. 1 in the men's doubles on 16 March 2017. He announced his retirement on 16 May 2024. The 2023 Japan Masters was his last tournament.
- Taichi Saito (born 21 April 1993 in Chiba, Japan) reached a career-high ranking of no. 14 in the men's doubles on 30 January 2024. He announced his retirement on 31 May 2024. The 2024 Thomas Cup was his last tournament.
- Rena Miyaura (born 25 July 1995 in Saitama Prefecture, Japan) reached a career-high ranking of no. 11 in the women's doubles on 23 January 2024. She announced her retirement on 6 June 2024. The 2024 Uber Cup was her last tournament.
- He Bingjiao (born 21 March 1997 in Suzhou, Jiangsu, China) reached a career-high ranking of no. 5 in the women singles on 17 October 2023. She won the silver medal at the 2024 Summer Olympics. As a key member of the Chinese team, she was part of title-winning Sudirman Cup and Uber Cup teams. BWF announced He Bingjiao's retirement on 13 August 2024. The 2024 Summer Olympics was her last tournament.
- Liu Yuchen (born 25 July 1995 in Beijing, China) reached a career-high ranking of no. 1 in the men's doubles on 6 April 2017. He won the silver medal at the 2020 Summer Olympics. He was also a 1-time World Champion. He announced his retirement on 19 August 2024. The 2024 Summer Olympics was his last tournament.
- Ou Xuanyi (born 23 January 1994 in Fujian, China) reached a career-high ranking of no. 2 in the men's doubles on 30 May 2023. He announced his retirement on 19 August 2024. The 2024 Summer Olympics was his last tournament.
- Tan Qiang (born 16 September 1998 in Nanjing, China) reached a career-high ranking of no. 10 in the men's doubles on 23 July 2019. He announced his retirement on 19 August 2024. The 2024 Ruichang China Masters was his last tournament.
- Kanta Tsuneyama (born 21 June 1996 in Shiga Prefecture, Japan) reached a career-high ranking of no. 10 in the men's singles on 26 November 2019. He announced his retirement from international badminton on 22 August 2024. The 2024 Japan Open was his last tournament.
- Wakana Nagahara (born 9 January 1996 in Hokkaido Prefecture, Japan) reached a career-high ranking of no. 1 in the women's doubles on 30 April 2019. She won two consecutive women's doubles titles at the BWF World Championships, at the 2018 and 2019 editions. She announced her retirement from international badminton on 4 September 2024. The 2024 Japan Open was her last tournament.
- (Chinese Taipei) Lee Yang (born 12 August 1995 in Taipei, Taiwan) reached a career-high ranking of no. 2 in the Men's doubles on 27 September 2022. He won the Olympic Games in 2021 and 2024. He announced his retirement on 8 September 2024. The 2024 BWF World Tour Finals was his last tournament.
- Aya Ohori (born 2 October 1996 in Aizuwakamatsu, Fukushima Prefecture, Japan) reached a career-high ranking of no. 7 in the Women's singles on 17 December 2024. She announced her retirement on 8 November 2024. The 2024 BWF World Tour Finals was her last tournament.
- Lauren Smith (born 26 September 1991 in Carlisle, Cumbria, England) reached a career-high ranking of no. 7 in the Mixed doubles on 21 June 2018. She announced her retirement on 10 November 2024. The 2024 European Championships was her last tournament.
- Marcus Ellis (born 14 September 1989 in Huddersfield, West Yorkshire, England) reached a career-high ranking of no. 7 in the Mixed doubles on 21 June 2018. He announced his retirement on 10 November 2024. The 2024 European Championships was his last tournament.
- Zheng Siwei (born 26 February 1997 in Wenzhou, Zhejiang, China) reached a career-high ranking of no. 1 in the Mixed doubles on 22 December 2016. He became Olympic champion in 2024 and is also a 3-time World Champion. He announced his retirement on 29 November 2024. The 2024 BWF World Tour Finals was his last tournament.
- Naru Shinoya (born 18 March 1994 in Ōbu, Aichi Japan) reached a career-high ranking of No. 13 in mixed doubles on 27 December 2022. She announced her retirement on 30 December 2024. The 2024 Malaysia International was her last tournament.
