= 2024 All Africa Men's Team Badminton Championships squads =

This article lists the confirmed men's squads lists for the 2024 All Africa Men's Team Badminton Championships. The ranking stated are based on the BWF World Ranking date on 11 February 2024 as per tournament's prospectus.

== Group A ==
=== Algeria ===
6 players are scheduled to represent Algeria at the 2024 All Africa Men's Team Badminton Championships.

Name	DoB/Age	Ranking of event	
Name	DoB/Age	MS	MD
Koceila Mammeri	23 February 1999 (aged 24)	-	66
Youcef Sabri Medel	5 July 1996 (aged 27)	214	66
Adel Hamek	25 October 1992 (aged 31)	246	124
Mohamed Abderrahime Belarbi	8 August 1992 (aged 31)	341	124
Mohamed Abdelaziz Ouchefoun	9 September 2001 (aged 22)	489	276
Sifeddine Larbaoui	30 June 2002 (aged 21)	500	276

=== Egypt ===
8 players are scheduled to represent Egypt at the 2024 All Africa Men's Team Badminton Championships.

Name	DoB/Age	Ranking of event	
Name	DoB/Age	MS	MD
Adham Hatem Elgamal	4 February 1998 (aged 26)	133	217
Ahmed Salah	30 September 1990 (aged 33)	368	217
Kareem Ezzat	10 October 2002 (aged 21)	582	369
Ahmed Elbahnasawy	7 August 2003 (aged 20)	1468	988
Abdelrahman Abdelsattar	5 May 2003 (aged 20)	1468	717
Aly Ashraf	1 May 2001 (aged 22)	902	717
Mohamed Mostafa Kamel	1 August 2000 (aged 23)	1468	-
Abdelrahman Abdelhakim	8 November 1996 (aged 27)	803	677

=== Uganda ===
4 players are scheduled to represent Uganda at the 2024 All Africa Men's Team Badminton Championships.

Name	DoB/Age	Ranking of event	
Name	DoB/Age	MS	MD
Expedito Emuddu	17 August 2003 (aged 20)	852	282
Muzafaru Lubega	8 May 2000 (aged 23)	520	180
Amos Muyanja	10 April 2000 (aged 23)	448	361
Augustus Owinyi	24 May 2000 (aged 23)	473	282

=== Zambia ===
5 players are scheduled to represent Zambia at the 2024 All Africa Men's Team Badminton Championships.

Name	DoB/Age	Ranking of event	
Name	DoB/Age	MS	MD
Kalombo Mulenga	29 December 2001 (aged 22)	289	233
Chongo Mulenga	19 August 1998 (aged 25)	615	233
Timothy Kafunda	4 January 1996 (aged 28)	571	262
Mwansa Rodrick	7 July 1999 (aged 24)	-	-
Marvin Chisela	20 April 1998 (aged 25)	902	-

== Group B ==
=== South Africa ===
4 players are scheduled to represent South Africa at the 2024 All Africa Men's Team Badminton Championships.

Name	DoB/Age	Ranking of event	
Name	DoB/Age	MS	MD
Caden Kakora	10 July 2003 (aged 20)	225	178
Cameron Coetzer	7 November 1995 (aged 28)	1627	708
Jarred Elliott	26 January 2000 (aged 24)	-	126
Robert Summers	13 May 2002 (aged 21)	314	126

=== Mauritius ===
6 players are scheduled to represent Mauritius at the 2024 All Africa Men's Team Badminton Championships.

Name	DoB/Age	Ranking of event	
Name	DoB/Age	MS	MD
Julien Paul	7 January 1996 (aged 28)	120	246
Jean Bernard Bongout	18 February 2001 (aged 22)	527	246
Lucas Douce	17 November 2006 (aged 17)	568	167
Khemtish Nundah	22 July 2005 (aged 18)	391	167
Melvin Appiah	28 March 1999 (aged 24)	402	272
Tejraj Pultoo	19 October 1999 (aged 24)	800	272

=== Nigeria ===
6 players are scheduled to represent Nigeria at the 2024 All Africa Men's Team Badminton Championships.

Name	DoB/Age	Ranking of event	
Name	DoB/Age	MS	MD
Anuoluwapo Juwon Opeyori	1 June 1997 (aged 24)	116	537
Godwin Olofua	18 April 1999 (aged 22)	445	510
Joseph Emmanuel Emmy	30 October 2004 (aged 17)	609	293
Victor Ikechukwu	28 May 1999 (aged 22)	688	293
Alhaji Aliyu Shehu	26 June 1996 (aged 25)	708	-
Nusa Momoh	15 January 1995 (aged 27)	1585	-

=== Cameroon ===
4 players are scheduled to represent Cameroon at the 2024 All Africa Men's Team Badminton Championships.

Name	DoB/Age	Ranking of event	
Name	DoB/Age	MS	MD
Felix Dureil Nkonomo Bengono	24 July 1995 (aged 26)	571	387
Michel Henri Assembe	6 December 1998 (aged 23)	587	387
Félix Michel Kemene Atangana	19 January 2002 (aged 20)	902	592
Paul Christ Assembe Voundi	26 January 2005 (aged 17)	902	717
