= List of badminton players at the 2020 Summer Olympics =

This is the list of badminton players who will be participating at the 2020 Summer Olympics in Tokyo, Japan from 24 July to 2 August.

NOC	Name	Birth date	Event and World Ranking				
NOC	Name	Birth date	MS	WS	MD	WD	XD
Australia	Chen Hsuan-yu	1 June 1993 (aged 28)		65			
Australia	Setyana Mapasa	15 August 1995 (aged 25)				23	
Australia	Gronya Somerville	10 May 1995 (aged 26)				23	48
Australia	Simon Leung	24 November 1996 (aged 24)					48
Austria	Luka Wraber	7 September 1990 (aged 30)	81				
Azerbaijan	Ade Resky Dwicahyo	13 May 1998 (aged 23)	69				
Belgium	Lianne Tan	24 November 1990 (aged 30)		42			
Brazil	Ygor Coelho	24 November 1996 (aged 24)	50				
Brazil	Fabiana Silva	15 August 1995 (aged 25)		68			
Bulgaria	Linda Zetchiri	20 November 1987 (aged 33)		61			
Bulgaria	Gabriela Stoeva	15 July 1994 (aged 27)				11	
Bulgaria	Stefani Stoeva	23 September 1995 (aged 25)				11	
Canada	Brian Yang	25 November 2001 (aged 19)	43				
Canada	Michelle Li	3 November 1991 (aged 29)		10			
Canada	Jason Ho-Shue	29 August 1998 (aged 22)			32		
Canada	Nyl Yakura	14 February 1993 (aged 28)			32		
Canada	Rachel Honderich	21 April 1996 (aged 25)				18	
Canada	Kristen Tsai	11 July 1995 (aged 26)				18	
Canada	Joshua Hurlburt-Yu	28 December 1994 (aged 26)					31
Canada	Josephine Wu	20 January 1995 (aged 26)					31
China	Chen Long	18 January 1989 (aged 32)	6				
China	Shi Yuqi	28 February 1996 (aged 25)	11				
China	Chen Yufei	1 March 1998 (aged 23)		1			
China	He Bingjiao	21 March 1997 (aged 24)		9			
China	Li Junhui	10 May 1995 (aged 26)			3		
China	Liu Yuchen	25 July 1995 (aged 25)			3		
China	Chen Qingchen	23 June 1997 (aged 24)				2	
China	Jia Yifan	29 June 1997 (aged 24)				2	
China	Du Yue	15 February 1998 (aged 23)				6	
China	Li Yinhui	11 March 1997 (aged 24)				6	
China	Zheng Siwei	26 February 1997 (aged 24)					1
China	Huang Yaqiong	28 February 1994 (aged 27)					1
China	Wang Yilyu	8 November 1994 (aged 26)					2
China	Huang Dongping	20 January 1995 (aged 26)					2
Chinese Taipei	Chou Tien-chen	8 January 1990 (aged 31)	2				
Chinese Taipei	Wang Tzu-wei	27 February 1995 (aged 26)	10				
Chinese Taipei	Tai Tzu-ying	20 June 1994 (aged 27)		2			
Chinese Taipei	Lee Yang	12 August 1995 (aged 25)			7		
Chinese Taipei	Wang Chi-lin	18 January 1995 (aged 26)			7		
Denmark	Anders Antonsen	27 April 1997 (aged 24)	4				
Denmark	Viktor Axelsen	4 January 1994 (aged 27)	3				
Denmark	Mia Blichfeldt	19 August 1997 (aged 23)		18			
Denmark	Kim Astrup	6 March 1992 (aged 29)			11		
Denmark	Anders Skaarup Rasmussen	15 February 1989 (aged 32)			11		
Denmark	Maiken Fruergaard	11 May 1995 (aged 26)				15	
Denmark	Sara Thygesen	20 January 1991 (aged 30)				15	
Denmark	Mathias Christiansen	20 February 1994 (aged 27)					17
Denmark	Alexandra Bøje	6 December 1999 (aged 21)					17
Egypt	Doha Hany	10 September 1997 (aged 23)		98		40	44
Egypt	Hadia Hosny	30 July 1988 (aged 32)				40	
Egypt	Adham Hatem Elgamal	4 February 1998 (aged 23)					44
Estonia	Raul Must	9 November 1987 (aged 33)	78				
Estonia	Kristin Kuuba	15 February 1997 (aged 24)		54			
Finland	Kalle Koljonen	26 February 1994 (aged 27)	64				
France	Brice Leverdez	9 April 1986 (aged 35)	34				
France	Qi Xuefei	28 February 1992 (aged 29)		37			
France	Thom Gicquel	12 January 1999 (aged 22)					14
France	Delphine Delrue	6 November 1998 (aged 22)					14
Germany	Kai Schäfer	13 June 1993 (aged 28)	68				
Germany	Yvonne Li	30 May 1998 (aged 23)		41			
Germany	Marvin Seidel	9 November 1995 (aged 25)			15		
Germany	Mark Lamsfuß	19 April 1994 (aged 27)			15		16
Germany	Isabel Herttrich	17 March 1992 (aged 29)					16
Great Britain	Toby Penty	12 August 1992 (aged 28)	53				
Great Britain	Kirsty Gilmour	21 September 1993 (aged 27)		26			
Great Britain	Ben Lane	13 July 1997 (aged 24)			25		
Great Britain	Sean Vendy	18 May 1996 (aged 25)			25		
Great Britain	Chloe Birch	16 September 1995 (aged 25)				16	
Great Britain	Lauren Smith	26 September 1991 (aged 29)				16	8
Great Britain	Marcus Ellis	14 September 1989 (aged 31)					8
Guatemala	Kevin Cordón	28 November 1986 (aged 34)	58				
Guatemala	Nikté Sotomayor	1 July 1994 (aged 27)		94			
Hong Kong	Ng Ka Long	24 June 1994 (aged 27)	8				
Hong Kong	Cheung Ngan Yi	27 April 1993 (aged 28)		34			
Hong Kong	Tang Chun Man	20 March 1995 (aged 26)					10
Hong Kong	Tse Ying Suet	9 November 1991 (aged 29)					10
Hungary	Gergely Krausz	25 December 1993 (aged 27)	90				
Hungary	Laura Sárosi	11 November 1992 (aged 28)		65			
India	B. Sai Praneeth	10 August 1992 (aged 28)	13				
India	P. V. Sindhu	5 July 1995 (aged 26)		7			
India	Satwiksairaj Rankireddy	13 August 2000 (aged 20)			9		
India	Chirag Shetty	4 July 1997 (aged 24)			9		
Indonesia	Anthony Sinisuka Ginting	20 October 1996 (aged 24)	5				
Indonesia	Jonatan Christie	15 September 1997 (aged 23)	7				
Indonesia	Gregoria Mariska Tunjung	11 August 1999 (aged 21)		20			
Indonesia	Marcus Fernaldi Gideon	9 March 1991 (aged 30)			1		
Indonesia	Kevin Sanjaya Sukamuljo	2 August 1995 (aged 25)			1		
Indonesia	Mohammad Ahsan	7 September 1987 (aged 33)			2		
Indonesia	Hendra Setiawan	25 August 1984 (aged 36)			2		
Indonesia	Greysia Polii	11 August 1987 (aged 33)				7	
Indonesia	Apriyani Rahayu	29 April 1998 (aged 23)				7	
Indonesia	Praveen Jordan	26 April 1993 (aged 28)					4
Indonesia	Melati Daeva Oktavianti	26 October 1994 (aged 26)					4
Iran	Sorayya Aghaei	28 January 1996 (aged 25)		99			
Ireland	Nhat Nguyen	16 June 2000 (aged 21)	60				
Israel	Misha Zilberman	30 January 1989 (aged 32)	45				
Israel	Ksenia Polikarpova	11 March 1990 (aged 31)		52			
Japan	Kento Momota	1 September 1994 (aged 26)	1				
Japan	Kanta Tsuneyama	21 June 1996 (aged 25)	12				
Japan	Nozomi Okuhara	13 March 1995 (aged 26)		3			
Japan	Akane Yamaguchi	6 June 1997 (aged 24)		5			
Japan	Hiroyuki Endo	16 December 1986 (aged 34)			4		
Japan	Yuta Watanabe	13 June 1997 (aged 24)			4		5
Japan	Takeshi Kamura	14 February 1990 (aged 31)			5		
Japan	Keigo Sonoda	20 February 1990 (aged 31)			5		
Japan	Yuki Fukushima	1 May 1993 (aged 28)				1	
Japan	Sayaka Hirota	1 August 1994 (aged 26)				1	
Japan	Mayu Matsumoto	7 August 1995 (aged 25)				3	
Japan	Wakana Nagahara	9 January 1996 (aged 25)				3	
Japan	Arisa Higashino	1 August 1996 (aged 24)					5
Malaysia	Lee Zii Jia	29 March 1998 (aged 23)	9				
Malaysia	Soniia Cheah Su Ya	19 June 1993 (aged 28)		27			
Malaysia	Aaron Chia	24 February 1997 (aged 24)			10		
Malaysia	Soh Wooi Yik	17 February 1998 (aged 23)			10		
Malaysia	Chow Mei Kuan	23 December 1994 (aged 26)				14	
Malaysia	Lee Meng Yean	30 March 1994 (aged 27)				14	
Malaysia	Chan Peng Soon	27 April 1988 (aged 33)					7
Malaysia	Goh Liu Ying	30 May 1989 (aged 32)					7
Maldives	Fathimath Nabaaha Abdul Razzaq	13 June 1999 (aged 22)		251			
Malta	Matthew Abela	18 March 1999 (aged 22)	321				
Mauritius	Julien Paul	7 January 1996 (aged 25)	77				
Mexico	Lino Muñoz	8 February 1991 (aged 30)	63				
Mexico	Haramara Gaitan	7 August 1996 (aged 24)		76			
Myanmar	Thet Htar Thuzar	15 March 1999 (aged 22)		56			
Netherlands	Mark Caljouw	25 January 1995 (aged 26)	35				
Netherlands	Selena Piek	30 September 1991 (aged 29)				17	15
Netherlands	Cheryl Seinen	4 August 1995 (aged 25)				17	
Netherlands	Robin Tabeling	24 April 1994 (aged 27)					15
Nigeria	Dorcas Ajoke Adesokan	5 July 1998 (aged 23)		71			
Nigeria	Godwin Olofua	18 April 1999 (aged 22)			44		
Nigeria	Anuoluwapo Juwon Opeyori	1 June 1997 (aged 24)			44		
Pakistan	Mahoor Shahzad	17 October 1996 (aged 24)		121			
Peru	Daniela Macías	9 October 1997 (aged 23)		69			
Refugee Olympic Team	Aram Mahmoud	15 July 1997 (aged 24)	170				
ROC	Sergey Sirant	12 April 1994 (aged 27)	67				
ROC	Evgeniya Kosetskaya	16 December 1994 (aged 26)		23			
ROC	Vladimir Ivanov	3 July 1987 (aged 34)			18		
ROC	Ivan Sozonov	6 July 1989 (aged 32)			18		
Singapore	Loh Kean Yew	26 June 1997 (aged 24)	36				
Singapore	Yeo Jia Min	1 February 1999 (aged 22)		25			
Slovakia	Martina Repiská	21 October 1995 (aged 25)		72			
South Korea	Heo Kwang-hee	11 August 1995 (aged 25)	31				
South Korea	An Se-young	5 February 2002 (aged 19)		8			
South Korea	Kim Ga-eun	7 February 1998 (aged 23)		16			
South Korea	Choi Sol-gyu	5 August 1995 (aged 25)			8		
South Korea	Seo Seung-jae	4 September 1997 (aged 23)			8		6
South Korea	Lee So-hee	14 June 1994 (aged 27)				4	
South Korea	Shin Seung-chan	6 December 1994 (aged 26)				4	
South Korea	Kim So-yeong	9 July 1992 (aged 29)				5	
South Korea	Kong Hee-yong	11 December 1996 (aged 24)				5	
South Korea	Chae Yoo-jung	9 May 1995 (aged 26)					6
Spain	Pablo Abián	12 June 1985 (aged 36)	44				
Spain	Clara Azurmendi	4 May 1998 (aged 23)		87			
Sri Lanka	Niluka Karunaratne	13 February 1985 (aged 36)	99				
Sweden	Felix Burestedt	26 February 1995 (aged 26)	54				
Switzerland	Sabrina Jaquet	21 June 1987 (aged 34)		50			
Thailand	Kantaphon Wangcharoen	18 September 1998 (aged 22)	14				
Thailand	Ratchanok Intanon	5 February 1995 (aged 26)		6			
Thailand	Busanan Ongbamrungphan	22 March 1996 (aged 25)		12			
Thailand	Jongkolphan Kititharakul	1 March 1993 (aged 28)				12	
Thailand	Rawinda Prajongjai	29 June 1993 (aged 28)				12	
Thailand	Dechapol Puavaranukroh	20 May 1997 (aged 24)					3
Thailand	Sapsiree Taerattanachai	18 April 1992 (aged 29)					3
Turkey	Neslihan Yiğit	26 February 1994 (aged 27)		29			
Ukraine	Artem Pochtarov	24 July 1993 (aged 27)	84				
Ukraine	Marija Ulitina	5 November 1991 (aged 29)		83			
United States	Timothy Lam	24 August 1997 (aged 23)	89				
United States	Beiwen Zhang	12 July 1990 (aged 31)		14			
United States	Phillip Chew	16 May 1994 (aged 27)			37		
United States	Ryan Chew	12 August 1996 (aged 24)			37		
Vietnam	Nguyễn Tiến Minh	12 February 1983 (aged 38)	71				
Vietnam	Nguyễn Thùy Linh	20 November 1997 (aged 23)		47			
