= 2020 African Badminton Championships =

Tournament details
- Dates: 14–16 February
- Venue: Cairo Stadium Hall 2
- Location: Cairo, Egypt

The 2020 African Badminton Championships (officially known as All Africa Individual Championships 2020) is the continental badminton championships to crown the best players across Africa. The tournament is being held at the Cairo Stadium Hall 2 in Cairo, Egypt, from 14 to 16 February 2020.

== Medalists ==
Event	Gold	Silver	Bronze
Men's singles	(Mauritius) Georges Paul	(Nigeria) Anuoluwapo Juwon Opeyori	(Nigeria) Godwin Olofua
Men's singles	(Mauritius) Georges Paul	(Nigeria) Anuoluwapo Juwon Opeyori	(Egypt) Adham Hatem Elgamal
Women's singles	(Mauritius) Kate Foo Kune	(Nigeria) Dorcas Ajoke Adesokan	(Egypt) Hadia Hosny
Women's singles	(Mauritius) Kate Foo Kune	(Nigeria) Dorcas Ajoke Adesokan	(Egypt) Doha Hany
Men's doubles	(Algeria) Koceila Mammeri (Algeria) Youcef Sabri Medel	(Mauritius) Aatish Lubah (Mauritius) Georges Paul	(Nigeria) Godwin Olofua (Nigeria) Anuoluwapo Juwon Opeyori
Men's doubles	(Algeria) Koceila Mammeri (Algeria) Youcef Sabri Medel	(Mauritius) Aatish Lubah (Mauritius) Georges Paul	(Nigeria) Enejoh Abah (Nigeria) Isaac Minaphee
Women's doubles	(Egypt) Doha Hany (Egypt) Hadia Hosny	(Nigeria) Dorcas Ajoke Adesokan (Nigeria) Uchechukwu Deborah Ukeh	(Nigeria) Grace Gabriel (Nigeria) Chineye Ibere
Women's doubles	(Egypt) Doha Hany (Egypt) Hadia Hosny	(Nigeria) Dorcas Ajoke Adesokan (Nigeria) Uchechukwu Deborah Ukeh	(South Africa) Amy Ackerman (South Africa) Michelle Butler-Emmett
Mixed doubles	(Egypt) Adham Hatem Elgamal (Egypt) Doha Hany	(Algeria) Koceila Mammeri (Algeria) Linda Mazri	(Mauritius) Tejraj Pultoo (Mauritius) Kobita Dookhee
Mixed doubles	(Egypt) Adham Hatem Elgamal (Egypt) Doha Hany	(Algeria) Koceila Mammeri (Algeria) Linda Mazri	(Egypt) Ahmed Salah (Egypt) Hadia Hosny

=== Medal table ===
* Host nation (Egypt)

Rank	Nation	Gold	Silver	Bronze	Total
1	Mauritius	2	1	1	4
2	Egypt*	2	0	4	6
3	Algeria	1	1	0	2
4	Nigeria	0	3	4	7
5	South Africa	0	0	1	1
Totals (5 entries)		5	5	10	20

== Tournament ==
The 2020 African Badminton Championships is a continental tournament to crown the best players in Africa.

=== Venue ===
This tournament was held at the Cairo Stadium Hall 2 in Cairo, Egypt.

=== Point distribution ===
The individual event of this tournament is graded based on the BWF points system for the BWF International Challenge event. Below is the table with the point distribution for each phase of the tournament.

Winner	Runner-up	3/4	5/8	9/16	17/32	33/64	65/128
4,000	3,400	2,800	2,200	1,520	920	360	170

== Men's singles ==
=== Seeds ===
1. (Mauritius) Georges Paul (champion)
2. (Nigeria) Anuoluwapo Juwon Opeyori (final)
3. (Nigeria) Godwin Olofua (semifinals)
4. (Egypt) Adham Hatem Elgamal (semifinals)
5. (Egypt) Ahmed Salah (third round)
6. (Algeria) Youcef Sabri Medel (quarterfinals)
7. (Mauritius) Melvin Appiah (second round)
8. (Mauritius) Aatish Lubah (quarterfinals)

=== Finals ===
Semi-finals
1	(Mauritius) Georges Paul	21	21
3	(Nigeria) Godwin Olofua	14	13
4	(Egypt) Adham Hatem Elgamal	21	12	12
2	(Nigeria) Anuoluwapo Juwon Opeyori	14	21	21

Final
1	(Mauritius) Georges Paul	16	21	23
2	(Nigeria) Anuoluwapo Juwon Opeyori	21	16	21

=== Top half ===
==== Section 1 ====
First Round
(Tunisia) R E M Belleh	10	10
(Algeria) K Mammeri	21	21

Second Round
1	(Mauritius) G Paul	21	21
(Uganda) I Wanagalya	12	13
(South Africa) R Summers	21	18	21
(Nigeria) T Bankole	13	21	16
5	(Egypt) A Salah	21	21
(Morocco) B E Harab	11	12
(Cameroon) F D N Bengono	10	8
(Algeria) K Mammeri	21	21

Third Round
1	(Mauritius) G Paul	21	21
(South Africa) R Summers	16	9
5	(Egypt) A Salah	15	21	17
(Algeria) K Mammeri	21	5	21

Quarter-finals
1	(Mauritius) G Paul	21	21
(Algeria) K Mammeri	11	14

==== Section 2 ====
First Round
(South Africa) B von Bodenstein	13	14
(Morocco) D Borroum	21	21
(Cameroon) M Soudi	18	10
(Uganda) D Mihigo	21	21

Second Round
3	(Nigeria) G Olofua	21	21
(Mauritius) J B Bongout	17	14
(Egypt) M M Kamel	21	18	21
(Morocco) D Borroum	14	21	17
6	(Algeria) Y S Medel	21	21
(Egypt) A Abdelhakim	18	18
(Tunisia) R Mouin	3	7
(Uganda) D Mihigo	21	21

Third Round
3	(Nigeria) G Olofua	21	21
(Egypt) M M Kamel	18	17
6	(Algeria) Y S Medel	21	21
(Uganda) D Mihigo	11	17

Quarter-finals
3	(Nigeria) G Olofua	21	21
6	(Algeria) Y S Medel	15	9

=== Bottom half ===
==== Section 3 ====
First Round
(Tunisia) K Ouzaier	10	9
(Nigeria) I Minaphee	21	21
(Mauritius) K Teeluck	12	21	14
(Algeria) A Hamek	21	19	21

Second Round
(Nigeria) I Minaphee	21	21
(Cameroon) F M K Atangana	4	5
(South Africa) R Snyman	21	21
7	(Mauritius) M Appiah	13	9
(Algeria) A Hamek	21	21
(Morocco) A Idlahoucine	10	8
(Uganda) D Senono	2	15
4	(Egypt) A H Elgamal	21	21

Third Round
(Nigeria) I Minaphee	12	21	18
(South Africa) R Snyman	21	19	21
(Algeria) A Hamek	16	21	11
4	(Egypt) A H Elgamal	21	14	21

Quarter-finals
(South Africa) R Snyman	19	15
4	(Egypt) A H Elgamal	21	21

==== Section 4 ====
First Round
(South Africa) J Mann	15	6
(Uganda) B Kasirye	21	21
(Egypt) M Montaser	21	21
(Cameroon) M H Assembe	11	11

Second Round
(Uganda) B Kasirye	21	21
(Egypt) M F Botros	14	16
(Morocco) Y Oubella	8	9
8	(Mauritius) A Lubah	21	21
(Egypt) M Montaser	18	7
(Algeria) M A Belarbi	21	21
(Tunisia) D M Yassine	5	11
2	(Nigeria) A J Opeyori	21	21

Third Round
(Uganda) B Kasirye	12	17
8	(Mauritius) A Lubah	21	21
(Algeria) M A Belarbi	21	13	18
2	(Nigeria) A J Opeyori	19	21	21

Quarter-finals
8	(Mauritius) A Lubah	22	17	19
2	(Nigeria) A J Opeyori	20	21	21

== Women's singles ==
=== Seeds ===
1. (Nigeria) Dorcas Ajoke Adesokan (final)
2. (Egypt) Doha Hany (semifinals)
3. (Mauritius) Kate Foo Kune (champion)
4. (Egypt) Hadia Hosny (semifinals)

=== Finals ===
Semi-finals
1	(Nigeria) Dorcas Ajoke Adesokan	21	21
4	(Egypt) Hadia Hosny	14	18
3	(Mauritius) Kate Foo Kune	21	21
2	(Egypt) Doha Hany	19	12

Final
1	(Nigeria) Dorcas Ajoke Adesokan	19	16
3	(Mauritius) Kate Foo Kune	21	21

=== Top half ===
==== Section 1 ====
First Round
(Egypt) J Ashraf	15	21	21
(Algeria) M Ouchefoun	21	15	14
(Tunisia) B A Wiem	5	6
(Cameroon) M C L Akoumba Ze	21	21

Second Round
1	(Nigeria) D A Adesokan	21	17	21
(Egypt) J Ashraf	17	21	9
(Mauritius) S Sandooyea	23	13	17
(Cameroon) M C L Akoumba Ze	21	21	21

Quarter-finals
1	(Nigeria) D A Adesokan	21	21
(Cameroon) M C L Akoumba Ze	9	9

==== Section 2 ====
First Round
(Algeria) L Mazri	22	18	21
(Mauritius) L Bodha	20	21	17
(South Africa) M Butler-Emmett	21	14	10
(Egypt) H T Mohamed	12	21	21
(Nigeria) C Ibere	21	21
(Mauritius) J L For Sang	12	10

Second Round
4	(Egypt) H Hosny	21	22
(Algeria) L Mazri	10	20
(Egypt) H T Mohamed	21	21
(Nigeria) C Ibere	13	6

Quarter-finals
4	(Egypt) H Hosny	21	21
(Egypt) H T Mohamed	11	13

=== Bottom half ===
==== Section 3 ====
First Round
(Egypt) N A Youssri	21	21
(Tunisia) E Khedhiri	5	4
(Nigeria) G Gabriel	21	21
(Cameroon) M P G Anamba	7	6
(Algeria) I Ziani	10	10
(South Africa) D L Jordaan	21	21

Second Round
(Egypt) N A Youssri	21	22
(Nigeria) G Gabriel	18	20
(South Africa) D L Jordaan	4	6
3	(Mauritius) K F Kune	21	21

Quarter-finals
(Egypt) N A Youssri	7	7
3	(Mauritius) K F Kune	21	21

==== Section 4 ====
First Round
(Kenya) M Joseph	9	13
(South Africa) A Ackerman	21	21
(Egypt) R M S Eladawy	29	9
(Algeria) H Bouksani	30	21
(Mauritius) K Dookhee	9	8
(Nigeria) U D Ukeh	21	21

Second Round
(South Africa) A Ackerman	16	11
(Algeria) H Bouksani	21	21
(Nigeria) U D Ukeh	21	18	14
2	(Egypt) D Hany	9	21	21

Quarter-finals
(Algeria) H Bouksani	15	10
2	(Egypt) D Hany	21	21

== Men's doubles ==
=== Seeds ===
1. (Nigeria) Godwin Olofua / Anuoluwapo Juwon Opeyori (semifinals)
2. (Algeria) Koceila Mammeri / Youcef Sabri Medel (champions)
3. (Egypt) Adham Hatem Elgamal / Ahmed Salah (quarterfinals)
4. (Nigeria) Enejoh Abah / Isaac Minaphee (semifinals)

=== Finals ===
Semi-finals
1	(Nigeria) Godwin Olofua (Nigeria) Anuoluwapo Juwon Opeyori	14	25
(Mauritius) Aatish Lubah (Mauritius) Georges Paul	21	27
4	(Nigeria) Enejoh Abah (Nigeria) Isaac Minaphee	18	11
2	(Algeria) Koceila Mammeri (Algeria) Youcef Sabri Medel	21	21

Final
(Mauritius) Aatish Lubah (Mauritius) Georges Paul	21	14	22
2	(Algeria) Koceila Mammeri (Algeria) Youcef Sabri Medel	19	21	24

=== Top half ===
==== Section 1 ====
First Round	Second Round					Quarter-finals
	1	(Nigeria) G Olofua (Nigeria) A J Opeyori	21	21
		(Cameroon) F M K Atangana (Cameroon) M Soudi	9	9
						1	(Nigeria) G Olofua (Nigeria) A J Opeyori	21	21
							(South Africa) C Coetzer (South Africa) J Elliott	18	12
	(Morocco) A Idlahoucine (Morocco) Y Oubella		22	14	17
	(South Africa) C Coetzer (South Africa) J Elliott		20	21	21

==== Section 2 ====
First Round
(Mauritius) A Lubah (Mauritius) G Paul	21	21
(Algeria) M A Belarbi (Algeria) A Hamek	13	16

Second Round
3	(Egypt) A H Elgamal (Egypt) A Salah	21	21
(Uganda) D Senono (Uganda) I Wanagalya	6	15
(Tunisia) D M Yassine (Tunisia) R E M Belleh	4	5
(Mauritius) A Lubah (Mauritius) G Paul	21	21

Quarter-finals
3	(Egypt) A H Elgamal (Egypt) A Salah	13	18
(Mauritius) A Lubah (Mauritius) G Paul	21	21

=== Bottom half ===
==== Section 3 ====
First Round
(South Africa) J Mann (South Africa) B von Bodenstein	21	18	23
(Morocco) D Bourroum (Morocco) B E Harab	13	21	21

Second Round
(South Africa) J Mann (South Africa) B von Bodenstein	21	21
(Egypt) M F Botros (Egypt) M Montaser	19	17
(Cameroon) M H Assembe (Cameroon) F D N Bengono	9	12
4	(Nigeria) E Abah (Nigeria) I Minaphee	21	21

Quarter-finals
(South Africa) J Mann (South Africa) B von Bodenstein	13	12
4	(Nigeria) E Abah (Nigeria) I Minaphee	21	21

==== Section 4 ====
First Round
(Mauritius) J B Bongout (Mauritius) T Pultoo	21	21
(Uganda) B Kasirye (Uganda) D Mihigo	12	17

Second Round
(Mauritius) J B Bongout (Mauritius) T Pultoo	21	21
(Tunisia) K Ouzaier (Tunisia) R Mouin	11	11
(Egypt) A Abdelhakim (Egypt) M M Kamel	8	14
2	(Algeria) K Mammeri (Algeria) Y S Medel	21	21

Quarter-finals
(Mauritius) J B Bongout (Mauritius) T Pultoo	8	14
2	(Algeria) K Mammeri (Algeria) Y S Medel	21	21

== Women's doubles ==
=== Seeds ===
1. (Egypt) Doha Hany / Hadia Hosny (champions)
2. (Nigeria) Dorcas Ajoke Adesokan / Uchechukwu Deborah Ukeh (final)

=== Finals ===
Semi-finals
1	(Egypt) Doha Hany (Egypt) Hadia Hosny	21	21
(Nigeria) Ruth Chinenye Ebere (Nigeria) Grace Gabriel	13	12
(South Africa) Amy Ackerman (South Africa) Michelle Butler-Emmett	21	8	11
2	(Nigeria) Dorcas Ajoke Adesokan (Nigeria) Uchechukwu Deborah Ukeh	19	21	21

Final
1	(Egypt) Doha Hany (Egypt) Hadia Hosny	21	21
2	(Nigeria) Dorcas Ajoke Adesokan (Nigeria) Uchechukwu Deborah Ukeh	14	17

=== Top half ===
==== Section 1 ====
First Round			Quarter-finals
			1	(Egypt) D Hany (Egypt) H Hosny	21	21
				(South Africa) D L Jordaan (South Africa) L Schoeman	14	11
(South Africa) D L Jordaan (South Africa) L Schoeman	21	21		(South Africa) D L Jordaan (South Africa) L Schoeman	14	11
(Algeria) M Ouchefoun (Algeria) I Ziani	14	6

==== Section 2 ====
First Round			Quarter-finals
			(Mauritius) L Bodha (Mauritius) J L For Sang	6	13
			(Nigeria) G Gabriel (Nigeria) C Ibere	21	21
(Nigeria) G Gabriel (Nigeria) C Ibere	21	21	(Nigeria) G Gabriel (Nigeria) C Ibere	21	21
(Cameroon) M C L Akoumba Ze (Cameroon) M P G Anamba	3	10

=== Bottom half ===
==== Section 3 ====
First Round
(Mauritius) A Allet (Mauritius) K Dookhee	21	21
(Egypt) N A Youssri (Egypt) J Ashraf	15	15
(Tunisia) B A Wiem (Tunisia) E Khedhiri	8	8
(South Africa) A Ackerman (South Africa) M Butler-Emmett	21	21

Quarter-finals
(Mauritius) A Allet (Mauritius) K Dookhee	17	19
(South Africa) A Ackerman (South Africa) M Butler-Emmett	21	21

==== Section 4 ====
First Round			Quarter-finals
(Algeria) H Bouksani (Algeria) L Mazri	23	21
(Egypt) R M S Eladawy (Egypt) H T Mohamed	21	13
(Egypt) R M S Eladawy (Egypt) H T Mohamed	21	13		(Algeria) H Bouksani (Algeria) L Mazri	18	6
			2	(Nigeria) D A Adesokan (Nigeria) U D Ukeh	21	21

== Mixed doubles ==
=== Seeds ===
1. (Egypt) Adham Hatem Elgamal / Doha Hany (champions)
2. (Egypt) Ahmed Salah / Hadia Hosny (semifinals)
3. (Algeria) Koceila Mammeri / Linda Mazri
4. (Mauritius) Tejraj Pultoo / Kobita Dookhee (semifinals)

=== Finals ===
Semi-finals
1	(Egypt) Adham Hatem Elgamal (Egypt) Doha Hany	21	21
4	(Mauritius) Tejraj Pultoo (Mauritius) Kobita Dookhee	16	9
3	(Algeria) Koceila Mammeri (Algeria) Linda Mazri	17	21	21
2	(Egypt) Ahmed Salah (Egypt) Hadia Hosny	21	16	8

Final
1	(Egypt) Adham Hatem Elgamal (Egypt) Doha Hany	21	18	21
3	(Algeria) Koceila Mammeri (Algeria) Linda Mazri	13	21	19

=== Top half ===
==== Section 1 ====
First Round	Second Round				Quarter-finals
	1	(Egypt) A H Elgamal (Egypt) D Hany	21	21
		(Algeria) M A Belarbi (Algeria) H Bouksani	8	13
					1	(Egypt) A H Elgamal (Egypt) D Hany	21	19	21
						(South Africa) C Coetzer (South Africa) M Butler-Emmett	13	21	13
	(South Africa) C Coetzer (South Africa) M Butler-Emmett		21	21
	(Mauritius) M Appiah (Mauritius) A Allet		15	11

==== Section 2 ====
First Round
(Tunisia) R Mouin (Tunisia) B A Wiem	13	10
(Nigeria) A A Shehu (Nigeria) S A Obanishola	21	21

Second Round
4	(Mauritius) T Pultoo (Mauritius) K Dookhee	21	21
(Cameroon) M Soudi (Cameroon) M C L Akoumba Ze	17	7
(Egypt) A Abdelhakim (Egypt) J Ashraf	21	21
(Nigeria) A A Shehu (Nigeria) S A Obanishola	11	19

Quarter-finals
4	(Mauritius) T Pultoo (Mauritius) K Dookhee	20	21	21
(Egypt) A Abdelhakim (Egypt) J Ashraf	22	17	12

=== Bottom half ===
==== Section 3 ====
First Round
(Egypt) M M Kamel (Egypt) N A Youssri	21	21
(South Africa) J Elliott (South Africa) A Ackerman	19	15

Second Round
(Egypt) M M Kamel (Egypt) N A Youssri	21	21
(Mauritius) J B Bongout (Mauritius) J L For Sang	23	23
(Nigeria) E Abah (Nigeria) R Yakubu	14	20
3	(Algeria) K Mammeri (Algeria) L Mazri	21	22

Quarter-finals
(Mauritius) J B Bongout (Mauritius) J L For Sang	14	12
3	(Algeria) K Mammeri (Algeria) L Mazri	21	21

==== Section 4 ====
First Round	Second Round				Quarter-finals
	(South Africa) J Mann (South Africa) D L Jordaan		21	21
	(Cameroon) M H Assembe (Cameroon) M P G Anamba		12	8
						(South Africa) J Mann (South Africa) D L Jordaan	15	8
					2	(Egypt) A Salah (Egypt) H Hosny	21	21
		(Tunisia) K Ouzaier (Tunisia) E Khedhiri	2	8
	2	(Egypt) A Salah (Egypt) H Hosny	21	21
