= Johanita Scholtz =

South African badminton player (born 2000)

Personal information
- Full name: Johanita Scholtz Albertse
- Born: 25 January 2000 (age 26) Cape Town, South Africa
- Height: 1.68 m (5 ft 6 in)
- Weight: 57 kg (126 lb)

Sport
- Country: South Africa
- Sport: Badminton

Women's singles & doubles
- Highest ranking: 88 (WS, 26 September 2023); 94 (WD with Amy Ackerman, 24 February 2026); 93 (XD with Caden Kakora, 12 March 2024)
- BWF profile
Medal record
Women's badminton
Representing South Africa
African Games
Gold medal – first place	2019 Rabat	Women's singles
Gold medal – first place	2023 Accra	Women's singles
Bronze medal – third place	2019 Rabat	Women's doubles
Bronze medal – third place	2019 Rabat	Mixed team
Bronze medal – third place	2023 Accra	Mixed doubles
African Championships
Gold medal – first place	2021 Kampala	Women's singles
Gold medal – first place	2021 Kampala	Women's doubles
Gold medal – first place	2025 Douala	Women's doubles
Gold medal – first place	2026 Gaborone	Women's doubles
Silver medal – second place	2023 Benoni	Women's singles
Silver medal – second place	2026 Gaborone	Women's singles
Bronze medal – third place	2017 Benoni	Women's doubles
Bronze medal – third place	2024 Cairo	Women's singles
Bronze medal – third place	2025 Douala	Mixed doubles
Africa Mixed Team Championships
Silver medal – second place	2017 Benoni	Mixed team
Bronze medal – third place	2021 Kampala	Mixed team
Bronze medal – third place	2023 Benoni	Mixed team
Bronze medal – third place	2025 Douala	Mixed team
Africa Women's Team Championships
Gold medal – first place	2024 Cairo	Women's team
Gold medal – first place	2026 Gaborone	Women's team

Johanita Scholtz Albertse (born 25 January 2000) is a South African badminton player. She won the gold medals in the women's singles at the 2019 and 2023 African Games; as well at the 2021 African Championships. Scholtz also claimed the gold medals in the women's doubles at the 2021, 2025 and 2026 African Championships.

Scholtz won her first senior international title at the 2017 Botswana International tournament. She competed at the 2018 and 2022 Commonwealth Games, and also at the 2024 Summer Olympics.

== Achievements ==
=== African Games ===
Women's singles
Year	Venue	Opponent	Score	Result
2019	Ain Chock Indoor Sports Center, Casablanca, Morocco	(Nigeria) Dorcas Ajoke Adesokan	21–19, 21–18	Gold
2023	Borteyman Sports Complex, Accra, Ghana	(Uganda) Husina Kobugabe	16–21, 21–17, 21–19	Gold

Women's doubles
Year	Venue	Partner	Opponent	Score	Result
2019	Ain Chock Indoor Sports Center; Casablanca, Morocco	(South Africa) Megan de Beer	(Nigeria) Dorcas Ajoke Adesokan (Nigeria) Uchechukwu Deborah Ukeh	16–21, 13–21	Bronze

Mixed doubles
Year	Venue	Partner	Opponent	Score	Result
2023	Borteyman Sports Complex; Accra, Ghana	(South Africa) Caden Kakora	(Egypt) Adham Hatem Elgamal (Egypt) Doha Hany	19–21, 16–21	Bronze

=== African Championships ===
Women's singles
Year	Venue	Opponent	Score	Result
2021	MTN Arena, Kampala, Uganda	(Egypt) Doha Hany	21–15, 21–11	Gold
2023	John Barrable Hall, Benoni, South Africa	(Uganda) Fadilah Mohamed Rafi	21–14, 14–21, 16–21	Silver
2024	Cairo Stadium Indoor Halls Complex, Cairo, Egypt	(Mauritius) Kate Ludik	20–22, 19–21	Bronze
2026	Royal Aria, Gaborone, Botswana	(Uganda) Fadilah Mohamed Rafi	17–21, 21–16, 19–21	Silver

Women's doubles
Year	Venue	Partner	Opponent	Score	Result
2017	John Barrable Hall, Benoni, South Africa	(South Africa) Sandra le Grange	(South Africa) Michelle Butler-Emmett (South Africa) Jennifer Fry	15–21, 20–22	Bronze
2021	MTN Arena, Kampala, Uganda	(South Africa) Amy Ackerman	(Algeria) Mounib Celia (Algeria) Tanina Mammeri	23–21, 21–13	Gold
2025	Gymnase de Japoma, Douala, Cameroon	(South Africa) Amy Ackerman	(Algeria) Yasmina Chibah (Algeria) Linda Mazri	24–22, 21–10	Gold
2026	Royal Aria, Gaborone, Botswana	(South Africa) Amy Ackerman	(Egypt) Nour Ahmed Youssri (Egypt) Doha Hany	21–18, 21–17	Gold

Mixed doubles
Year	Venue	Partner	Opponent	Score	Result
2025	Gymnase de Japoma, Douala, Cameroon	(South Africa) Caden Kakora	(Algeria) Koceila Mammeri (Algeria) Tanina Mammeri	9–21, 11–22	Bronze

=== BWF International Challenge/Series (17 titles, 10 runners-up) ===
Women's singles
Year	Tournament	Opponent	Score	Result
2016	Rose Hill International	(Uganda) Bridget Shamim Bangi	7–21, 22–20, 15–21	(silver) Runner-up
2017	Botswana International	(Uganda) Aisha Nakiyemba	21–10, 21–17	(gold) Winner
2019	Botswana International	(South Africa) Megan de Beer	21–11, 21–8	(gold) Winner
2021	Benin International	(South Africa) Deidre Laurens	21–11, 21–10	(gold) Winner
2021	Botswana International	(India) Revati Devasthale	21–18, 13–21, 13–21	(silver) Runner-up
2021	South Africa International	(South Africa) Deidre Laurens	21–10, 21–11	(gold) Winner
2022	Botswana International	(Luxembourg) Kim Schmidt	21–12, 21–17	(gold) Winner
2022	South Africa International	(Chinese Taipei) Lee Yu-hsuan	8–21, 9–21	(silver) Runner-up
2023	Benin International	(Egypt) Nour Ahmed Youssri	21–17, 20–22, 21–19	(gold) Winner
2024	South Africa International	(Italy) Gianna Stiglich	21–14 Retired	(gold) Winner
2025	Botswana International	(India) Anvitha Vijay	21–15, 21–16	(gold) Winner
2025	South Africa International	(Chinese Taipei) Lee Yu-hsuan	17–21, 18–21	(silver) Runner-up

Women's doubles
Year	Tournament	Partner	Opponent	Score	Result
2018	South Africa International	(South Africa) Lehandre Schoeman	(South Africa) Michelle Butler-Emmett (South Africa) Jennifer Fry	21–17, 21–16	(gold) Winner
2019	Botswana International	(South Africa) Megan de Beer	(South Africa) Michelle Butler-Emmett (South Africa) Kerry-Lee Harrington	21–18, 22–20	(gold) Winner
2019	South Africa International	(South Africa) Megan de Beer	(Italy) Katharina Fink (Italy) Yasmine Hamza	21–16, 15–21, 16–21	(silver) Runner-up
2021	Botswana International	(South Africa) Amy Ackerman	(Kazakhstan) Kamila Smagulova (Kazakhstan) Aisha Zhumabek	21–9, 21–10	(gold) Winner
2021	South Africa International	(South Africa) Amy Ackerman	(South Africa) Megan de Beer (South Africa) Deidre Laurens	21–17, 21–11	(gold) Winner
2023	South Africa International	(South Africa) Megan de Beer	(South Africa) Amy Ackerman (South Africa) Deidre Laurens	14–21, 19–21	(silver) Runner-up
2025	Zambia International	(South Africa) Amy Ackerman	(Maldives) Aminath Nabeeha Abdul Razzaq (Maldives) Fathimath Nabaaha Abdul Razzaq	21–16, 21–14	(gold) Winner
2025	Botswana International	(South Africa) Amy Ackerman	(Maldives) Aminath Nabeeha Abdul Razzaq (Maldives) Fathimath Nabaaha Abdul Razzaq	19–21, 21–13, 21–15	(gold) Winner
2025	South Africa International	(South Africa) Amy Ackerman	(Maldives) Aminath Nabeeha Abdul Razzaq (Maldives) Fathimath Nabaaha Abdul Razzaq	21–9, 24–26, 21–14	(gold) Winner
2026	Zambia International	(South Africa) Amy Ackerman	(United Arab Emirates) Sreeyuktha Sreejith Parol (United Arab Emirates) Nayonika Rajesh	21–18, 21–14	(gold) Winner

Mixed doubles
Year	Tournament	Partner	Opponent	Score	Result
2019	Botswana International	(South Africa) Jason Mann	(South Africa) Jarred Elliott (South Africa) Megan de Beer	19–21, 14–21	(silver) Runner-up
2023	Kampala International	(South Africa) Caden Kakora	(United Arab Emirates) Kuswanto (United Arab Emirates) Sreeyuktha Sreejith Parol	9–21, 21–17, 23–25	(silver) Runner-up
2023	Uganda International	(South Africa) Caden Kakora	(Algeria) Koceila Mammeri (Algeria) Tanina Mammeri	17–21, 18–21	(silver) Runner-up
2024	South Africa International	(South Africa) Caden Kakora	(South Africa) Robert Summers (South Africa) Anri Schoonees	21–12, 23–21	(gold) Winner
2025	Botswana International	(South Africa) Caden Kakora	(South Africa) Robert Summers (South Africa) Amy Ackerman	10–21, 21–16, 13–21	(silver) Runner-up

BWF International Challenge tournament
BWF International Series tournament
BWF Future Series tournament
