= Badminton at the 2023 African Games – Men's doubles =

Men's doubles at the 2023 African Games
- Venue: Borteyman Sports Complex
- Dates: 8–10 March 2024

Medalists
gold medal	Koceila Mammeri; Youcef Sabri Medel	Algeria
silver medal	Godwin Olofua; Anuoluwapo Juwon Opeyori	Nigeria
bronze medal	Adham Hatem Elgamal; Ahmed Salah	Egypt
bronze medal	Jarred Elliott; Robert Summers	South Africa

The badminton men's doubles tournament at the 2023 African Games in Accra took place from 8 to 10 March 2024 at the Borteyman Sports Complex.

== Schedule ==
All times are Greenwich Mean Time (UTC±00:00)

Date	Time	Event
Friday, 8 March 2024	09:00	Round of 32
Saturday, 9 March 2024	09:00	Round of 16
Saturday, 9 March 2024	15:00	Quarter-finals
Sunday, 10 March 2024	09:00	Semi-finals
Sunday, 10 March 2024	15:00	Gold medal match

== Results ==
=== Seeds ===
1. Koceila Mammeri / Youcef Sabri Medel (ALG)
2. Jarred Elliott / Robert Summers (RSA) (semi-finals)
3. Chongo Mulenga / Kalombo Mulenga (ZAM) (second round)
4. Mohamed Abderrahime Belarbi / Adel Hamek (ALG) (second round)

=== Finals ===
Semi-finals
1	Koceila Mammeri (ALG); Youcef Sabri Medel (ALG)	21	21
Adham Hatem Elgamal (EGY); Ahmed Salah (EGY)	14	19
Godwin Olofua (NGR); Anuoluwapo Juwon Opeyori (NGR)	21	21
2	Jarred Elliott (RSA); Robert Summers (RSA)	18	16

Final
1	Koceila Mammeri (ALG); Youcef Sabri Medel (ALG)	21	21
Godwin Olofua (NGR); Anuoluwapo Juwon Opeyori (NGR)	6	15

=== Top half ===
==== Section 1 ====
First round
J E Emmy (NGR); V Ikechukwu (NGR)	21	21
S Lamptey (GHA); A Tamakloe (GHA)	8	10
M Lubega (UGA); A Muyanja (UGA)	21	21
F Kafando (BUR); O Ouedraogo (BUR)	14	14

Second round
1	K Mammeri (ALG); Y S Medel (ALG)	21	17	21
J E Emmy (NGR); V Ikechukwu (NGR)	18	21	11
J B Bongout (MRI); J Paul (MRI)	21	21
M Lubega (UGA); A Muyanja (UGA)	6	10

Quarter-finals
1	K Mammeri (ALG); Y S Medel (ALG)	21	21
J B Bongout (MRI); J Paul (MRI)	15	10

==== Section 2 ====
First round
A H Elgamal (EGY); A Salah (EGY)	21	21
P Adomahou (BEN); C M C Kpanou (BEN)	11	10
E Ankou (TOG); A Issa (TOG)	21	21
J L Nsogo Nguema (GEQ); T O Nguema Nfono (GEQ)	3	11
M Dimitri (CGO); D N Mananga Nzoussi (CGO)
C Coetzer (RSA); C Kakora (RSA)	w	/	o

Second round
3	C Mulenga (ZAM); K Mulenga (ZAM)	11	21	27
A H Elgamal (EGY); A Salah (EGY)	21	16	29
E Ankou (TOG); A Issa (TOG)	9	8
C Coetzer (RSA); C Kakora (RSA)	21	21

Quarter-finals
A H Elgamal (EGY); A Salah (EGY)	21	21
C Coetzer (RSA); C Kakora (RSA)	12	12

==== Section 3 ====
First round
K Souleymann (TOG); M Tchagafou (TOG)	9	8
C C Ahouangassi (BEN); O A Fano-Dosh (BEN)	21	21
A Abdul-Samad (GHA); K E Alphous (GHA)	14	20
E Emuddu (UGA); A Owinyi (UGA)	21	22
D K Lutonadio (GEQ); S Obiegue (GEQ)	10	12
G Olofua (NGR); A J Opeyori (NGR)	21	21

Second round
C C Ahouangassi (BEN); O A Fano-Dosh (BEN)	21	16	15
E Emuddu (UGA); A Owinyi (UGA)	17	21	21
G Olofua (NGR); A J Opeyori (NGR)	21	21
4	M A Belarbi (ALG); A Hamek (ALG)	14	18

Quarter-finals
E Emuddu (UGA); A Owinyi (UGA)	11	12
G Olofua (NGR); A J Opeyori (NGR)	21	21

==== Section 4 ====
First round
A Kiros (ERI); L Semere (ERI)	16	10
M Ouedraogo (BUR); A F Tapsoba (BUR)	21	21
B Bakala (CGO); J Oyou (CGO)	6	9
A Elbahnasawy (EGY); K Ezzat (EGY)	21	21

Second round
M Ouedraogo (BUR); A F Tapsoba (BUR)	13	19
L N A Addo (GHA); E Korampong (GHA)	21	21
A Elbahnasawy (EGY); K Ezzat (EGY)	11	15
2	J Elliott (RSA); Robert Summers (RSA)	21	21

Quarter-finals
L N A Addo (GHA); E Korampong (GHA)	5	12
2	J Elliott (RSA); Robert Summers (RSA)	21	21
