= 2024 All Africa Men's and Women's Team Badminton Championships =

Tournament details
- Dates: 12–15 February
- Edition: 10th
- Venue: Cairo Stadium Hall 4
- Location: Cairo, Egypt

Champions
- Men's teams: Algeria
- Women's teams: South Africa

The 2024 All Africa Men's and Women's Team Badminton Championships was a continental stage tournament to crown the best men's and women's badminton team in Africa. The tournament also served as the African qualifiers for the 2024 Thomas & Uber Cup to be held in Chengdu, China. This tournament was held in Cairo, Egypt between 12 and 15 February 2024.

The title holders of the men's team were Algeria, who have been defending their title since 2018. Hosts Egypt were the title holders of the women's team event.

== Medalists ==
| Event | Gold | Silver | Bronze |
|---|---|---|---|
| Men's team | Algeria; Mohamed Abderrahime Belarbi; Adel Hamek; Sifeddine Larbaoui; Koceila Mammeri; Youcef Sabri Medel; Mohamed Abdelaziz Ouchefoun | Nigeria; Joseph Emmanuel Emmy; Victor Ikechukwu; Nusa Momoh; Godwin Olofua; Anuoluwapo Juwon Opeyori; Alhaji Aliyu Shehu | Egypt; Abdelrahman Abdelhakim; Abdelrahman Magdy Abdelsattar; Ahmed Ali Abdelmajeed Elbahnasawy; Ashraf Aly; Adham Hatem Elgamal; Ezzat Kareem; Mohamed Mostafa Kamel; Ahmed Salah |
| Men's team | Algeria; Mohamed Abderrahime Belarbi; Adel Hamek; Sifeddine Larbaoui; Koceila Mammeri; Youcef Sabri Medel; Mohamed Abdelaziz Ouchefoun | Nigeria; Joseph Emmanuel Emmy; Victor Ikechukwu; Nusa Momoh; Godwin Olofua; Anuoluwapo Juwon Opeyori; Alhaji Aliyu Shehu | Mauritius; Melvin Appiah; Jean Bernard Bongout; Lucas Douce; Khemtish Rai Nundah; Julien Paul; Tejraj Pultoo |
| Women's team | South Africa; Amy Ackerman; Megan de Beer; Deidre Laurens; Diane Olivier; Johanita Scholtz | Uganda; Husina Kobugabe; Gladys Mbabazi; Fadilah Mohamed Rafi; Tracy Naluwooza | Algeria; Halla Bouksani; Mounib Celia; Yasmina Chibah; Tanina Mammeri; Linda Mazri; Malak Ouchefoun |
| Women's team | South Africa; Amy Ackerman; Megan de Beer; Deidre Laurens; Diane Olivier; Johanita Scholtz | Uganda; Husina Kobugabe; Gladys Mbabazi; Fadilah Mohamed Rafi; Tracy Naluwooza | Nigeria; Dorcas Ajoke Adesokan; Zainab Damilola Alabi; Sofiat Arinola Obanishola; Christiana Olajumoke Obasanmi; Uchechukwu Deborah Ukeh; Ramatu Yakubu |

=== Medal table ===
* Host nation (Egypt)

| Rank | Nation | Gold | Silver | Bronze | Total |
|---|---|---|---|---|---|
| 1 | Algeria | 1 | 0 | 1 | 2 |
| 2 | South Africa | 1 | 0 | 0 | 1 |
| 3 | Nigeria | 0 | 1 | 1 | 2 |
| 4 | Uganda | 0 | 1 | 0 | 1 |
| 5 | Egypt* | 0 | 0 | 1 | 1 |
| 5 | Mauritius | 0 | 0 | 1 | 1 |
| Totals (6 entries) | | 2 | 2 | 4 | 8 |

== Tournament ==
The All Africa Men's and Women's Team Badminton Championships officially crowns the best male and female national badminton teams in Africa and at the same time works as the African qualification event towards the 2024 Thomas & Uber Cup finals.

=== Venue ===
The team event was held at the Cairo Stadium Indoor Halls Complex, in Cairo, Egypt.

=== Draw ===
The draw was revealed on 13 February 2024. Both the men's team and the women's team group stage consists of two groups. 15 teams consisting of 8 men's team and 7 women's team have entered the tournament.

- Men's team

| Group A | Group B |
|---|---|
| Algeria; Egypt; Zambia; Uganda | Nigeria; Mauritius; South Africa; Cameroon |

- Women's team

| Group A | Group B |
|---|---|
| South Africa; Algeria; Mauritius; Cameroon | Uganda; Nigeria; Egypt |

== Men's team ==
All times are Egypt Standard Time (UTC+02:00).

=== Group stage ===
==== Group A ====
| Pos | Team | Pld | W | L | MF | MA | MD | GF | GA | GD | PF | PA | PD | Pts | Qualification |
|---|---|---|---|---|---|---|---|---|---|---|---|---|---|---|---|
| 1 | Algeria | 3 | 3 | 0 | 13 | 2 | +11 | 27 | 6 | +21 | 657 | 505 | +152 | 3 | Knockout stage |
| 2 | Egypt (H) | 3 | 2 | 1 | 11 | 4 | +7 | 22 | 11 | +11 | 622 | 513 | +109 | 2 | Knockout stage |
| 3 | Zambia | 3 | 1 | 2 | 5 | 10 | −5 | 13 | 20 | −7 | 559 | 598 | −39 | 1 | |
| 4 | Uganda | 3 | 0 | 3 | 1 | 14 | −13 | 3 | 28 | −25 | 417 | 639 | −222 | 0 | |

Source: TS
(H) Host
- Algeria vs Zambia

Algeria
5
Cairo Stadium Hall 4, Court 3
12 February 2024, 09:00

Zambia
0

| | | | 1 | 2 | 3 |
|---|---|---|---|---|---|
| 1 | (Algeria) (Zambia) | Adel Hamek; Kalombo Mulenga | 21; 17 | 23; 21 |
| 2 | (Algeria) (Zambia) | Mohamed Abderrahime Belarbi; Timothy Kafunda | 21; 14 | 21; 8 |
| 3 | (Algeria) (Zambia) | Mohamed Abdelaziz Ouchefoun; Chongo Mulenga | 19; 21 | 21; 18 | 21; 15 |
| 4 | (Algeria) (Zambia) | Mohamed Abderrahime Belarbi / Adel Hamek; Timothy Kafunda / Rodrick Mwansa | 21; 14 | 21; 6 |
| 5 | (Algeria) (Zambia) | Koceila Mammeri / Youcef Sabri Medel; Chongo Ezra Mulenga / Kalombo Mulenga | 21; 10 | 21; 16 |

- Egypt vs Uganda

Egypt
5
Cairo Stadium Hall 4, Court 1
12 February 2024, 13:00

Uganda
0

| | | | 1 | 2 | 3 |
|---|---|---|---|---|---|
| 1 | (Egypt) (Uganda) | Adham Hatem Elgamal; Amos Muyanja | 21; 9 | 21; 18 |
| 2 | (Egypt) (Uganda) | Abdelrahman Abdelhakim; Augustus Owinyi | 21; 11 | 21; 8 |
| 3 | (Egypt) (Uganda) | Mohamed Mostafa Kamel; Muzafaru Lubega | 21; 18 | 21; 12 |
| 4 | (Egypt) (Uganda) | Abdelrahman Abdelhakim / Ahmed Salah; Expendito Emuddu / Augustus Owinyi | 21; 15 | 21; 11 |
| 5 | (Egypt) (Uganda) | Ezzat Kareem / Mohamed Mostafa Kamel; Muzafaru Lubega / Amos Muyanja | 21; 13 | 21; 12 |

- Algeria vs Uganda

Algeria
5
Cairo Stadium Hall 4, Court 3
13 February 2024, 09:00

Uganda
0

| | | | 1 | 2 | 3 |
|---|---|---|---|---|---|
| 1 | (Algeria) (Uganda) | Youcef Sabri Medel; Amos Muyanja | 21; 19 | 21; 15 |
| 2 | (Algeria) (Uganda) | Mohamed Abdelaziz Ouchefoun; Augustus Owinyi | 21; 8 | 21; 12 |
| 3 | (Algeria) (Uganda) | Sifeddine Larbaoui; Muzafaru Lubega | 21; 15 | 15; 21 | 21; 15 |
| 4 | (Algeria) (Uganda) | Koceila Mammeri / Youcef Sabri Medel; Expendito Emuddu / Augustus Owinyi | 21; 13 | 21; 17 |
| 5 | (Algeria) (Uganda) | Mohamed Abderrahime Belarbi / Adel Hamek; Muzafaru Lubega / Amos Muyanja | 21; 18 | 21; 14 |

- Egypt vs Zambia

Egypt
4
Cairo Stadium Hall 4, Court 2
13 February 2024, 14:00

Zambia
1

| | | | 1 | 2 | 3 |
|---|---|---|---|---|---|
| 1 | (Egypt) (Zambia) | Ahmed Salah; Kalombo Mulenga | 19; 21 | 16; 21 |
| 2 | (Egypt) (Zambia) | Ezzat Kareem; Chongo Ezra Mulenga | 12; 21 | 21; 8 | 21; 6 |
| 3 | (Egypt) (Zambia) | Abdelrahman Abdelhakim; Rodrick Mwansa | 15; 21 | 21; 10 | 21; 9 |
| 4 | (Egypt) (Zambia) | Adham Hatem Elgamal / Ahmed Salah; Chongo Ezra Mulenga / Kalombo Mulenga | 21; 17 | 21; 19 |
| 5 | (Egypt) (Zambia) | Abdelrahman Abdelhakim / Mohamed Mostafa Kamel; Timothy Kafunda / Rodrick Mwansa | 22; 20 | 24; 22 |

- Uganda vs Zambia

Uganda
1
Cairo Stadium Hall 4, Court 1
13 February 2024, 19:00

Zambia
4

| | | | 1 | 2 | 3 |
|---|---|---|---|---|---|
| 1 | (Uganda) (Zambia) | Amos Muyanja; Kalombo Mulenga | 8; 21 | 5; 21 |
| 2 | (Uganda) (Zambia) | Augustus Owinyi; Chongo Ezra Mulenga | 10; 21 | 15; 21 |
| 3 | (Uganda) (Zambia) | Muzafaru Lubega; Rodrick Mwansa | 17; 21 | 19; 21 |
| 4 | (Uganda) (Zambia) | Expendito Emuddu / Augustus Owinyi; Chongo Ezra Mulenga / Kalombo Mulenga | 9; 21 | 7; 21 |
| 5 | (Uganda) (Zambia) | Muzafaru Lubega / Amos Muyanja; Timothy Kafunda / Rodrick Mwansa | 21; 16 | 22; 20 |

- Algeria vs Egypt

Algeria
3
Cairo Stadium Hall 4, Court 3
14 February 2024, 09:00

Egypt
2

| | | | 1 | 2 | 3 |
|---|---|---|---|---|---|
| 1 | (Algeria) (Egypt) | Youcef Sabri Medel; Ezzat Kareem | 15; 21 | 18; 21 |
| 2 | (Algeria) (Egypt) | Adel Hamek; Abdelrahman Magdy Abdelsattar | 21; 14 | 21; 14 |
| 3 | (Algeria) (Egypt) | Mohamed Abderrahime Belarbi; Ahmed Ali Abdelmajeed Elbahnasawy | 9; 21 | 21; 14 | 12; 21 |
| 4 | (Algeria) (Egypt) | Koceila Mammeri / Youcef Sabri Medel; Abdelrahman Magdy Abdelsattar / Ashraf Aly | 21; 9 | 21; 12 |
| 5 | (Algeria) (Egypt) | Sifeddine Larbaoui / Mohamed Abdelaziz Ouchefoun; Ahmed Ali Abdelmajeed Elbahnasawy / Ezzat Kareem | 21; 17 | 21; 14 |

==== Group B ====
| Pos | Team | Pld | W | L | MF | MA | MD | GF | GA | GD | PF | PA | PD | Pts | Qualification |
|---|---|---|---|---|---|---|---|---|---|---|---|---|---|---|---|
| 1 | Nigeria | 3 | 3 | 0 | 12 | 3 | +9 | 26 | 9 | +17 | 690 | 517 | +173 | 3 | Knockout stage |
| 2 | Mauritius | 3 | 2 | 1 | 11 | 4 | +7 | 25 | 9 | +16 | 667 | 492 | +175 | 2 | Knockout stage |
| 3 | South Africa | 3 | 1 | 2 | 7 | 8 | −1 | 15 | 18 | −3 | 578 | 556 | +22 | 1 | |
| 4 | Cameroon | 3 | 0 | 3 | 0 | 15 | −15 | 0 | 30 | −30 | 260 | 630 | −370 | 0 | |

Source: TS
- South Africa vs Cameroon

South Africa
5
Cairo Stadium Hall 4, Court 2
12 February 2024, 09:00

Cameroon
0

| | | | 1 | 2 | 3 |
|---|---|---|---|---|---|
| 1 | (South Africa) (Cameroon) | Caden Kakora; Michel Henri Assembe | 21; 6 | 21; 8 |
| 2 | (South Africa) (Cameroon) | Robert Summers; Paul Christ Assembe Voundi | 21; 6 | 21; 7 |
| 3 | (South Africa) (Cameroon) | Jarred Elliott; Félix Michel Kemene Atangana | 21; 6 | 21; 14 |
| 4 | (South Africa) (Cameroon) | Cameron Coetzer / Caden Kakora; Paul Christ Assembe Voundi / Felix Dureil Nkonomo Bengono | 21; 7 | 21; 18 |
| 5 | (South Africa) (Cameroon) | Jarred Elliott / Robert Summers; Michel Henri Assembe / Félix Michel Kemene Atangana | 21; 7 | 21; 9 |

- Mauritius vs Nigeria

Mauritius
2
Cairo Stadium Hall 4, Court 2
12 February 2024, 13:00

Nigeria
3

| | | | 1 | 2 | 3 |
|---|---|---|---|---|---|
| 1 | (Mauritius) (Nigeria) | Khemtish Rai Nundah; Godwin Olofua | 15; 21 | 12; 21 |
| 2 | (Mauritius) (Nigeria) | Jean Bernard Bongout; Joseph Emmanuel Emmy | 21; 14 | 21; 13 |
| 3 | (Mauritius) (Nigeria) | Julien Paul; Anuoluwapo Juwon Opeyori | 21; 17 | 13; 21 | 17; 21 |
| 4 | (Mauritius) (Nigeria) | Lucas Douce / Khemtish Rai Nundah; Joseph Emmanuel Emmy / Victor Ikechukwu | 26; 24 | 17; 21 | 9; 21 |
| 5 | (Mauritius) (Nigeria) | Jean Bernard Bongout / Julien Paul; Godwin Olofua / Anuoluwapo Juwon Opeyori | 15; 21 | 21; 10 | 21; 15 |

- South Africa vs Nigeria

South Africa
1
Cairo Stadium Hall 4, Court 2
13 February 2024, 09:00

Nigeria
4

| | | | 1 | 2 | 3 |
|---|---|---|---|---|---|
| 1 | (South Africa) (Nigeria) | Caden Kakora; Anuoluwapo Juwon Opeyori | 14; 21 | 11; 21 |
| 2 | (South Africa) (Nigeria) | Robert Summers; Godwin Olofua | 21; 19 | 16; 21 | 21; 23 |
| 3 | (South Africa) (Nigeria) | Cameron Coetzer; Alhaji Aliyu Shehu | 13; 21 | 19; 21 |
| 4 | (South Africa) (Nigeria) | Jarred Elliott / Robert Summers; Joseph Emmanuel Emmy / Victor Ikechukwu | 21; 16 | 18; 21 | 21; 14 |
| 5 | (South Africa) (Nigeria) | Cameron Coetzer / Caden Kakora; Godwin Olofua / Anuoluwapo Juwon Opeyori | 17; 21 | 17; 21 |

- Mauritius vs Cameroon

Mauritius
5
Cairo Stadium Hall 4, Court 1
13 February 2024, 14:00

Cameroon
0

| | | | 1 | 2 | 3 |
|---|---|---|---|---|---|
| 1 | (Mauritius) (Cameroon) | Khemtish Rai Nundah; Felix Dureil Nkonomo Bengono | 21; 6 | 21; 8 |
| 2 | (Mauritius) (Cameroon) | Melvin Appiah; Michel Henri Assembe | 21; 14 | 21; 8 |
| 3 | (Mauritius) (Cameroon) | Lucas Douce; Félix Michel Kemene Atangana | 21; 14 | 21; 13 |
| 4 | (Mauritius) (Cameroon) | Melvin Appiah / Tejraj Pultoo; Paul Christ Assembe Voundi / Felix Dureil Nkonomo Bengono | 21; 4 | 21; 9 |
| 5 | (Mauritius) (Cameroon) | Lucas Douce / Khemtish Rai Nundah; Michel Henri Assembe / Félix Michel Kemene Atangana | 21; 10 | 21; 7 |

- Nigeria vs Cameroon

Nigeria
5
Cairo Stadium Hall 4, Court 2
14 February 2024, 09:00

Cameroon
0

| | | | 1 | 2 | 3 |
|---|---|---|---|---|---|
| 1 | (Nigeria) (Cameroon) | Anuoluwapo Juwon Opeyori; Michel Henri Assembe | 21; 11 | 21; 6 |
| 2 | (Nigeria) (Cameroon) | Godwin Olofua; Félix Michel Kemene Atangana | 21; 6 | 21; 7 |
| 3 | (Nigeria) (Cameroon) | Victor Ikechukwu; Paul Christ Assembe Voundi | 21; 7 | 21; 8 |
| 4 | (Nigeria) (Cameroon) | Joseph Emmanuel Emmy / Anuoluwapo Juwon Opeyori; Michel Henri Assembe / Félix Michel Kemene Atangana | 21; 10 | 21; 12 |
| 5 | (Nigeria) (Cameroon) | Nusa Momoh / Godwin Olofua; Paul Christ Assembe Voundi / Felix Dureil Nkonomo Bengono | 21; 8 | 21; 4 |

- South Africa vs Mauritius

South Africa
1
Cairo Stadium Hall 4, Court 1
14 February 2024, 09:00

Mauritius
4

| | | | 1 | 2 | 3 |
|---|---|---|---|---|---|
| 1 | (South Africa) (Mauritius) | Caden Kakora; Julien Paul | 15; 21 | 15; 21 |
| 2 | (South Africa) (Mauritius) | Robert Summers; Jean Bernard Bongout | 20; 22 | 8; 21 |
| 3 | (South Africa) (Mauritius) | Cameron Coetzer; Lucas Douce | 14; 21 | 5; 21 |
| 4 | (South Africa) (Mauritius) | Jarred Elliott / Robert Summers; Jean Bernard Bongout / Julien Paul | 13; 21 | 14; 21 |
| 5 | (South Africa) (Mauritius) | Cameron Coetzer / Caden Kakora; Melvin Appiah / Tejraj Pultoo | 23; 21 | 11; 21 | 21; 17 |

=== Knockout stage ===
==== Bracket ====
Semi-finals
14 February 18:00
Algeria | 3
Mauritius | 1
14 February 18:00
Egypt | 2
Nigeria | 3

Final
15 February 15:00
Algeria | 3
Nigeria | 2

==== Semi-finals ====
- Algeria (Group A Winner) vs Mauritius (Group B Runner-up)

Algeria
3
Cairo Stadium Hall 4, Court 1
14 February 2024, 18:00

Mauritius
1

| | | | 1 | 2 | 3 |
|---|---|---|---|---|---|---|
| 1 | (Algeria) (Mauritius) | Mohamed Abderrahime Belarbi; Lucas Douce | 21; 15 | 21; 16 |
| 2 | (Algeria) (Mauritius) | Adel Hamek; Jean Bernard Bongout | 21; 17 | 21; 14 |
| 3 | (Algeria) (Mauritius) | Youcef Sabri Medel; Julien Paul | 8; 21 | 15; 21 |
| 4 | (Algeria) (Mauritius) | Adel Hamek / Koceila Mammeri; Lucas Douce / Khemtish Rai Nundah | 21; 10 | 21; 15 |
| 5 | (Algeria) (Mauritius) | Mohamed Abderrahime Belarbi / Youcef Sabri Medel; Jean Bernard Bongout / Julien Paul | | | | not played |

- Egypt (Group A Runner-up) vs Nigeria (Group B Winner)

Egypt
2
Cairo Stadium Hall 4, Court 2
14 February 2024, 18:00

Nigeria
3

| | | | 1 | 2 | 3 |
|---|---|---|---|---|---|
| 1 | (Egypt) (Nigeria) | Adham Hatem Elgamal; Anuoluwapo Juwon Opeyori | 15; 21 | 21; 6 | 21; 11 |
| 2 | (Egypt) (Nigeria) | Ahmed Salah; Godwin Olofua | 21; 14 | 21; 10 |
| 3 | (Egypt) (Nigeria) | Mohamed Mostafa Kamel; Victor Ikechukwu | 21; 14 | 8; 21 | 17; 21 |
| 4 | (Egypt) (Nigeria) | Adham Hatem Elgamal / Ahmed Salah; Godwin Olofua / Anuoluwapo Juwon Opeyori | 16; 21 | 21; 19 | 18; 21 |
| 5 | (Egypt) (Nigeria) | Ezzat Kareem / Mohamed Mostafa Kamel; Joseph Emmanuel Emmy / Victor Ikechukwu | 17; 21 | 16; 21 |

==== Final ====
- Algeria vs Nigeria

Algeria
3
Cairo Stadium Hall 4, Court 1
15 February 2024, 15:00

Nigeria
2

| | | | 1 | 2 | 3 |
|---|---|---|---|---|---|
| 1 | (Algeria) (Nigeria) | Koceila Mammeri; Victor Ikechukwu | 20; 22 | 17; 21 |
| 2 | (Algeria) (Nigeria) | Youcef Sabri Medel; Anuoluwapo Juwon Opeyori | 17; 21 | 12; 21 |
| 3 | (Algeria) (Nigeria) | Adel Hamek; Godwin Olofua | 21; 18 | 16; 21 | 21; 16 |
| 4 | (Algeria) (Nigeria) | Mohamed Abderrahime Belarbi / Youcef Sabri Medel; Joseph Emmanuel Emmy / Victor Ikechukwu | 24; 22 | 21; 18 |
| 5 | (Algeria) (Nigeria) | Adel Hamek / Koceila Mammeri; Godwin Olofua / Anuoluwapo Juwon Opeyori | 25; 23 | 21; 15 |

=== Final ranking ===
| Pos | Team | Pld | W | L | Pts | MD | GD | PD | Final result |
|---|---|---|---|---|---|---|---|---|---|
| 1st place, gold medalist(s) | Algeria | 5 | 5 | 0 | 10 | +14 | +26 | +169 | Champions |
| 2nd place, silver medalist(s) | Nigeria | 5 | 4 | 1 | 8 | +9 | +17 | +164 | Runners-up |
| 3rd place, bronze medalist(s) | Egypt (H) | 4 | 2 | 2 | 4 | +6 | +10 | +121 | Eliminated in semi-finals |
| 3rd place, bronze medalist(s) | Mauritius | 4 | 2 | 2 | 4 | +5 | +12 | +155 | Eliminated in semi-finals |
| 5 | South Africa | 3 | 1 | 2 | 2 | –1 | –3 | +22 | Eliminated in group stage |
| 6 | Zambia | 3 | 1 | 2 | 2 | –5 | –7 | –39 | Eliminated in group stage |
| 7 | Uganda | 3 | 0 | 3 | 0 | –13 | –25 | –222 | Eliminated in group stage |
| 8 | Cameroon | 3 | 0 | 3 | 0 | –15 | –30 | –370 | Eliminated in group stage |

== Women's team ==
All times are Egypt Standard Time (UTC+02:00).

=== Group stage ===
==== Group A ====
| Pos | Team | Pld | W | L | MF | MA | MD | GF | GA | GD | PF | PA | PD | Pts | Qualification |
|---|---|---|---|---|---|---|---|---|---|---|---|---|---|---|---|
| 1 | South Africa | 3 | 3 | 0 | 11 | 4 | +7 | 23 | 10 | +13 | 629 | 480 | +149 | 3 | Knockout stage |
| 2 | Algeria | 3 | 2 | 1 | 10 | 5 | +5 | 22 | 11 | +11 | 614 | 495 | +119 | 2 | Knockout stage |
| 3 | Mauritius | 3 | 1 | 2 | 9 | 6 | +3 | 19 | 13 | +6 | 560 | 521 | +39 | 1 | |
| 4 | Cameroon | 3 | 0 | 3 | 0 | 15 | −15 | 0 | 30 | −30 | 326 | 633 | −307 | 0 | |

Source: TS
- South Africa vs Cameroon

South Africa
5
Cairo Stadium Hall 4, Court 3
12 February 2024, 13:00

Cameroon
0

| | | | 1 | 2 | 3 |
|---|---|---|---|---|---|
| 1 | (South Africa) (Cameroon) | Amy Ackerman / Deidre Laurens; Madeleine Carene Leticia Akoumba Ze / Maeva Princia Gertrude Anamba | 21; 9 | 21; 11 |
| 2 | (South Africa) (Cameroon) | Megan de Beer / Johanita Scholtz; Séraphine Merveille Avidi Meka / Khan Diack Woti | 21; 9 | 21; 13 |
| 3 | (South Africa) (Cameroon) | Diane Olivier; Maeva Princia Gertrude Anamba | 21; 6 | 21; 8 |
| 4 | (South Africa) (Cameroon) | Deidre Laurens; Séraphine Merveille Avidi Meka | 21; 11 | 21; 13 |
| 5 | (South Africa) (Cameroon) | Johanita Scholtz; Madeleine Carene Leticia Akoumba Ze | 21; 7 | 21; 9 |

- Mauritius vs Cameroon

Mauritius
5
Cairo Stadium Hall 4, Court 2
12 February 2024, 18:00

Cameroon
0

| | | | 1 | 2 | 3 |
|---|---|---|---|---|---|
| 1 | (Mauritius) (Cameroon) | Kate Ludik; Madeleine Carene Leticia Akoumba Ze | 21; 8 | 21; 10 |
| 2 | (Mauritius) (Cameroon) | Lorna Bodha; Maeva Princia Gertrude Anamba | 24; 22 | 21; 8 |
| 3 | (Mauritius) (Cameroon) | How Hong Chiara Kate; Séraphine Merveille Avidi Meka | 21; 13 | 21; 12 |
| 4 | (Mauritius) (Cameroon) | Lorna Bodha / Kobita Dookhee; Madeleine Carene Leticia Akoumba Ze / Maeva Princia Gertrude Anamba | 21; 12 | 21; 16 |
| 5 | (Mauritius) (Cameroon) | Vilina Appiah / Tiya Bhurtun; Séraphine Merveille Avidi Meka / Khan Diack Woti | 21; 9 | 21; 14 |

- South Africa vs Algeria

South Africa
3
Cairo Stadium Hall 4, Court 3
12 February 2024, 18:00

Algeria
2

| | | | 1 | 2 | 3 |
|---|---|---|---|---|---|
| 1 | (South Africa) (Algeria) | Amy Ackerman / Deidre Laurens; Yasmina Chibah / Linda Mazri | 22; 20 | 21; 7 |
| 2 | (South Africa) (Algeria) | Megan de Beer / Johanita Scholtz; Halla Bouksani / Tanina Mammeri | 21; 19 | 14; 21 | 17; 21 |
| 3 | (South Africa) (Algeria) | Diane Olivier; Yasmina Chibah | 17; 21 | 10; 21 |
| 4 | (South Africa) (Algeria) | Johanita Scholtz; Tanina Mammeri | 21; 14 | 21; 10 |
| 5 | (South Africa) (Algeria) | Deidre Laurens; Halla Bouksani | 21; 16 | 12; 21 | 21; 17 |

- Mauritius vs Algeria

Mauritius
2
Cairo Stadium Hall 4, Court 1
13 February 2024, 09:00

Algeria
3

| | | | 1 | 2 | 3 |
|---|---|---|---|---|---|
| 1 | (Mauritius) (Algeria) | Kate Ludik; Tanina Mammeri | 21; 13 | 21; 17 |
| 2 | (Mauritius) (Algeria) | Tiya Bhurtun; Yasmina Chibah | 11; 21 | 12; 21 |
| 3 | (Mauritius) (Algeria) | Lorna Bodha; Halla Bouksani | 14; 21 | 12; 21 |
| 4 | (Mauritius) (Algeria) | Kobita Dookhee / Kate Ludik; Yasmina Chibah / Linda Mazri | 18; 21 | 21; 7 | 21; 12 |
| 5 | (Mauritius) (Algeria) | Tiya Bhurtun / Lorna Bodha; Halla Bouksani / Tanina Mammeri | 7; 21 | 13; 21 |

- Algeria vs Cameroon

Algeria
5
Cairo Stadium Hall 4, Court 3
13 February 2024, 14:00

Cameroon
0

| | | | 1 | 2 | 3 |
|---|---|---|---|---|---|
| 1 | (Algeria) (Cameroon) | Yasmina Chibah; Madeleine Carene Leticia Akoumba Ze | 21; 13 | 21; 10 |
| 2 | (Algeria) (Cameroon) | Halla Bouksani; Maeva Princia Gertrude Anamba | 21; 7 | 21; 15 |
| 3 | (Algeria) (Cameroon) | Malak Ouchefoun; Séraphine Merveille Avidi Meka | 21; 11 | 21; 14 |
| 4 | (Algeria) (Cameroon) | Tanina Mammeri / Linda Mazri; Madeleine Carene Leticia Akoumba Ze / Maeva Princia Gertrude Anamba | 21; 10 | 21; 10 |
| 5 | (Algeria) (Cameroon) | Mounib Celia / Malak Ouchefoun; Séraphine Merveille Avidi Meka / Khan Diack Woti | 21; 8 | 21; 8 |

- South Africa vs Mauritius

South Africa
3
Cairo Stadium Hall 4, Court 3
13 February 2024, 19:00

Mauritius
2

| | | | 1 | 2 | 3 |
|---|---|---|---|---|---|
| 1 | (South Africa) (Mauritius) | Deidre Laurens; Kobita Dookhee | 21; 18 | 21; 6 |
| 2 | (South Africa) (Mauritius) | Diane Olivier; Tiya Bhurtun | 15; 21 | 17; 21 |
| 3 | (South Africa) (Mauritius) | Johanita Scholtz; Kate Ludik | 14; 21 | 21; 15 | 21; 13 |
| 4 | (South Africa) (Mauritius) | Amy Ackerman / Deidre Laurens; Vilina Appiah / Tiya Bhurtun | 21; 11 | 21; 8 |
| 5 | (South Africa) (Mauritius) | Megan de Beer / Johanita Scholtz; Kobita Dookhee / Kate Ludik | 13; 21 | 16; 21 |

==== Group B ====
| Pos | Team | Pld | W | L | MF | MA | MD | GF | GA | GD | PF | PA | PD | Pts | Qualification |
|---|---|---|---|---|---|---|---|---|---|---|---|---|---|---|---|
| 1 | Uganda | 2 | 2 | 0 | 8 | 2 | +6 | 16 | 7 | +9 | 441 | 370 | +71 | 2 | Knockout stage |
| 2 | Nigeria | 2 | 1 | 1 | 5 | 5 | 0 | 12 | 12 | 0 | 423 | 430 | −7 | 1 | Knockout stage |
| 3 | Egypt (H) | 2 | 0 | 2 | 2 | 8 | −6 | 7 | 16 | −9 | 370 | 434 | −64 | 0 | |

Source: TS
(H) Host
- Uganda vs Nigeria

Uganda
4
Cairo Stadium Hall 4, Court 1
12 February 2024, 09:00

Nigeria
1

| | | | 1 | 2 | 3 |
|---|---|---|---|---|---|
| 1 | (Uganda) (Nigeria) | Fadilah Mohamed Rafi; Christiana Olajumoke Obasanmi | 21; 5 | 21; 7 |
| 2 | (Uganda) (Nigeria) | Husina Kobugabe; Uchechukwu Deborah Ukeh | 18; 21 | 21; 19 | 21; 15 |
| 3 | (Uganda) (Nigeria) | Gladys Mbabazi; Sofiat Arinola Obanishola | 21; 15 | 15; 21 | 21; 16 |
| 4 | (Uganda) (Nigeria) | Fadilah Mohamed Rafi / Tracy Naluwooza; Uchechukwu Deborah Ukeh / Ramatu Yakubu | 21; 19 | 21; 16 |
| 5 | (Uganda) (Nigeria) | Husina Kobugabe / Gladys Mbabazi; Dorcas Ajoke Adesokan / Sofiat Arinola Obanishola | 12; 21 | 20; 22 |

- Egypt vs Nigeria

Egypt
1
Cairo Stadium Hall 4, Court 1
12 February 2024, 18:00

Nigeria
4

| | | | 1 | 2 | 3 |
|---|---|---|---|---|---|
| 1 | (Egypt) (Nigeria) | Rahma El Adawy / Hana Tarek; Dorcas Ajoke Adesokan / Sofiat Arinola Obanishola | 21; 18 | 8; 21 | 16; 21 |
| 2 | (Egypt) (Nigeria) | Jana Abdelkader / Doha Hany; Uchechukwu Deborah Ukeh / Ramatu Yakubu | 21; 12 | 17; 21 | 19; 21 |
| 3 | (Egypt) (Nigeria) | Hana Tarek; Sofiat Arinola Obanishola | 15; 21 | 13; 21 |
| 4 | (Egypt) (Nigeria) | Doha Hany; Zainab Damilola Alabi | 21; 11 | 21; 17 |
| 5 | (Egypt) (Nigeria) | Jana Abdelkader; Dorcas Ajoke Adesokan | 7; 21 | 18; 21 |

- Uganda vs Egypt

Uganda
4
Cairo Stadium Hall 4, Court 2
13 February 2024, 19:00

Egypt
1

| | | | 1 | 2 | 3 |
|---|---|---|---|---|---|
| 1 | (Uganda) (Egypt) | Fadilah Mohamed Rafi; Rahma El Adawy | 21; 7 | 21; 12 |
| 2 | (Uganda) (Egypt) | Husina Kobugabe; Hana Tarek | 21; 19 | 21; 12 |
| 3 | (Uganda) (Egypt) | Gladys Mbabazi; Kawther Mohamed Rabie | 21; 10 | 20; 22 | 21; 15 |
| 4 | (Uganda) (Egypt) | Fadilah Mohamed Rafi / Tracy Naluwooza; Jana Abdelkader / Doha Hany | 14; 21 | 6; 21 |
| 5 | (Uganda) (Egypt) | Husina Kobugabe / Gladys Mbabazi; Rahma El Adawy / Hana Tarek | 21; 16 | 21; 18 |

=== Knockout stage ===
==== Bracket ====
Semi-finals
14 February 14:00
South Africa | 3
Nigeria | 2
14 February 14:00
Algeria | 0
Uganda | 3

Final
15 February 15:00
South Africa | 3
Uganda | 2

==== Semi-finals ====
- South Africa(Group A Winner) vs Nigeria(Group B Runner-up)

South Africa
3
Cairo Stadium Hall 4, Court 1
14 February 2024, 14:00

Nigeria
2

| | | | 1 | 2 | 3 |
|---|---|---|---|---|---|
| 1 | (South Africa) (Nigeria) | Johanita Scholtz; Zainab Damilola Alabi | 21; 7 | 21; 11 |
| 2 | (South Africa) (Nigeria) | Diane Olivier; Sofiat Arinola Obanishola | 13; 21 | 10; 21 |
| 3 | (South Africa) (Nigeria) | Deidre Laurens; Dorcas Ajoke Adesokan | 15; 21 | 15; 21 |
| 4 | (South Africa) (Nigeria) | Megan de Beer / Johanita Scholtz; Uchechukwu Deborah Ukeh / Ramatu Yakubu | 21; 16 | 8; 21 | 21; 18 |
| 5 | (South Africa) (Nigeria) | Amy Ackerman / Deidre Laurens; Dorcas Ajoke Adesokan / Sofiat Arinola Obanishola | 17; 21 | 21; 12 | 21; 15 |

- Algeria(Group A Runner-up) vs Uganda(Group B Winner)

Algeria
0
Cairo Stadium Hall 4, Court 2
14 February 2024, 14:00

Uganda
3

| | | | 1 | 2 | 3 |
|---|---|---|---|---|---|---|
| 1 | (Algeria) (Uganda) | Halla Bouksani; Gladys Mbabazi | 21; 18 | 16; 21 | 15; 21 |
| 2 | (Algeria) (Uganda) | Yasmina Chibah; Husina Kobugabe | 17; 21 | 16; 21 |
| 3 | (Algeria) (Uganda) | Tanina Mammeri; Fadilah Mohamed Rafi | 19; 21 | 12; 21 |
| 4 | (Algeria) (Uganda) | Yasmina Chibah / Linda Mazri; Husina Kobugabe / Gladys Mbabazi | | | | not played |
| 5 | (Algeria) (Uganda) | Halla Bouksani / Tanina Mammeri; Fadilah Mohamed Rafi / Tracy Naluwooza | | | | not played |

==== Final ====
- South Africa vs Uganda

South Africa
3
Cairo Stadium Hall 4, Court 2
15 February 2024, 15:00

Uganda
2

| | | | 1 | 2 | 3 |
|---|---|---|---|---|---|
| 1 | (South Africa) (Uganda) | Deidre Laurens; Gladys Mbabazi | 18; 21 | 17; 21 |
| 2 | (South Africa) (Uganda) | Diane Olivier; Husina Kobugabe | 4; 21 | 10; 21 |
| 3 | (South Africa) (Uganda) | Johanita Scholtz; Fadilah Mohamed Rafi | 21; 11 | 21; 14 |
| 4 | (South Africa) (Uganda) | Amy Ackerman / Deidre Laurens; Husina Kobugabe / Gladys Mbabazi | 21; 14 | 21; 15 |
| 5 | (South Africa) (Uganda) | Megan de Beer / Johanita Scholtz; Fadilah Mohamed Rafi / Tracy Naluwooza | 21; 13 | 21; 18 |

=== Final ranking ===
| Pos | Team | Pld | W | L | Pts | MD | GD | PD | Final result |
|---|---|---|---|---|---|---|---|---|---|
| 1st place, gold medalist(s) | South Africa | 5 | 5 | 0 | 10 | +9 | +15 | +154 | Champions |
| 2nd place, silver medalist(s) | Uganda | 4 | 3 | 1 | 6 | +8 | +12 | +93 | Runners-up |
| 3rd place, bronze medalist(s) | Algeria | 4 | 2 | 2 | 4 | +2 | +6 | +91 | Eliminated in semi-finals |
| 3rd place, bronze medalist(s) | Nigeria | 3 | 1 | 2 | 2 | –1 | 0 | –6 | Eliminated in semi-finals |
| 5 | Mauritius | 3 | 1 | 2 | 2 | +3 | +6 | +39 | Eliminated in group stage |
| 6 | Egypt (H) | 2 | 0 | 2 | 0 | –6 | –9 | –64 | Eliminated in group stage |
| 7 | Cameroon | 3 | 0 | 3 | 0 | –15 | –30 | –307 | Eliminated in group stage |
