= 2020 FIBA U18 Women's African Championship =

2020 FIBA U18 Women's AfroBasket
15th FIBA Africa Under-18 Women's Championship

Tournament details
- Host country: Egypt
- Dates: 3−9 December
- Teams: 3 (from 1 confederation)
- Venue(s): 1 (in 1 host city)

Final positions
- Champions: Egypt (2nd title)

Tournament statistics
- MVP: (Egypt) Yara Hussein
- Top scorer: (Mali) Sissoko 18.2
- Top rebounds: (Mali) Kouyate 17.6
- Top assists: (Senegal) Thiaw 5.5
- PPG (Team): Mali 66.0
- RPG (Team): Mali 59.0
- APG (Team): Mali 18.2

Official website
- www.fiba.basketball

The 2020 FIBA U18 Women's African Championship was the 15th edition, played under the rules of FIBA, the world governing body for basketball, and the FIBA Africa thereof. The tournament was hosted by Egypt from 3 to 9 December 2020 in Cairo.

Egypt won the tournament for their second continental title, their first since 2010, by defeating the defending champions Mali in the Finals, 68–63. Both finalists qualified for the 2021 FIBA U19 Women's Basketball World Cup that were held in Debrecen, Hungary. Yara Hussein, team captain of the host team, was named the Most Valuable Player of the tournament.

== Venue ==
All matches were played in the Hall 3 of the Cairo Stadium Indoor Halls Complex.

Cairo	2020 FIBA U18 Women's African Championship is located in Egypt
Cairo Stadium Indoor Halls Complex; Hall 3 (Capacity: 720)	2020 FIBA U18 Women's African Championship is located in Egypt
Image	2020 FIBA U18 Women's African Championship is located in Egypt

== Group phase ==
In the group phase, the teams played a double round-robin tournament. The top two teams advanced to the Final.

Pos	Team	Pld	W	L	PF	PA	PD	Pts	Qualification
1	Mali	4	4	0	267	167	+100	8	Final
2	Egypt (H)	4	1	3	209	247	−38	5	Final
3	Senegal	4	1	3	191	253	−62	5	

Source: FIBA
(H) Hosts

3 December
16:00

Boxscore

Egypt	36–64	Mali
Scoring by quarter: 7–18, 6–14, 7–23, 16–9
Pts: Hal. Yassine 9 Rebs: Elfiky 8 Asts: Elfiky, Hag. Yassine 2		Pts: Sissoko 14; Rebs: Kouyate 14; Asts: S. Berthe 5

Cairo Stadium, Cairo, Egypt
Referees: Astou Dabo (SEN), Nadege Zouzou (CIV), Monicca Nassuuna (UGA)

4 December
20:00

Boxscore

Mali	61–37	Senegal
Scoring by quarter: 10–13, 18–8, 18–11, 15–5
Pts: Sissoko 16; Rebs: Kouyate 20; Asts: D. Berthe, Sissoko 8		Pts: Faye 10; Rebs: Thiaw, Gassama 11; Asts: Thiaw 5

Cairo Stadium, Cairo, Egypt
Referees: Nadege Zouzou (CIV), Monicca Nassuuna (UGA), Lizzy Nambuya (UGA)

5 December
15:00

Boxscore

Senegal	48–54	Egypt
Scoring by quarter: 15–8, 13–14, 7–13, 13–19
Pts: Faye 11; Rebs: Gassama 11; Asts: Thiaw 7		Pts: Hussein 19; Rebs: Hussein 19; Asts: Abdelhamid 3

Cairo Stadium, Cairo, Egypt
Referees: Haytham Ihaqaf (LBY), Adama Samake (MLI), Lizzy Nambuya (UGA)

6 December
15:00

Boxscore

Mali	68–55	Egypt
Scoring by quarter: 18–13, 22–12, 10–18, 18–12
Pts: D. Berthe 33; Rebs: Kouyate 15; Asts: S. Berthe 7		Pts: Mossad, Hussein 11; Rebs: Hussein 13; Asts: Salma BahgatBahgat 6

Cairo Stadium, Cairo, Egypt
Referees: Monicca Nassuuna (UGA), Opeyemi Oluwaseun Ogunleye (NGA), Lizzy Nambuya (UGA)

7 December
17:30

Boxscore

Senegal	39–74	Mali
Scoring by quarter: 18-13, 6-16, 8-20, 7-25
Pts: Fanta Gassama 11; Rebs: Khadija Faye 9 Asts: Victorine Thiaw, Bineta Diatta 2		Pts: Diarrah Issa Sissoko 22; Rebs: Alima Kouyate 19; Asts: Diarrah Issa Sissoko, Koudedia Cissé 3

Cairo Stadium, Cairo, Egypt
Referees: Nadege Zouzou (CIV), Monicca Nassuuna (UGA), Opeyemi Oluwaseun Ogunleye (NGA)

8 December
15:00

Boxscore

Egypt	64–67 (3-6)	Senegal
Scoring by quarter: 25-17, 8-18, 11-8, 17-18, Overtime: 3-6
Pts: Farida Mossad 13; Rebs: Yara Hussein 13; Asts: Salma Bahgat 8		Pts: Ndate Ndiaye 21; Rebs: Khadija Faye 15; Asts: Victorine Thiaw 8

Cairo Stadium, Cairo, Egypt
Referees: Opeyemi Oluwaseun Ogunleye (NGA), Mohamed Lamline Diawara (MLI), Adama Samake (MLI)

== Final ==
9 December
17:00

Boxscore

Mali	63–68	Egypt
Scoring by quarter: 19-17, 14-17, 9–15, 21-19
Pts: Diarrah Issa Sissoko 30; Rebs: Alima Kouyate 20; Asts: Diarrah Issa Sissoko 5		Pts: Hager Yassine 27; Rebs: Aya Elfiky 10; Asts: Salma Bahgat 5

Cairo Stadium, Cairo, Egypt
Referees: Monicca Nassuuna (UGA), Astou Dabo (SEN), Haytham Ihaqaf (LBY)

== Final standings ==
Qualified for the 2021 FIBA U19 Women's Basketball World Cup

Rank	Team	Record
Gold medal	Egypt	2-3
Silver medal	Mali	4-1
Bronze medal	Senegal	1-3
