= Youcef Sabri Medel =

Algerian badminton player (born 1996)

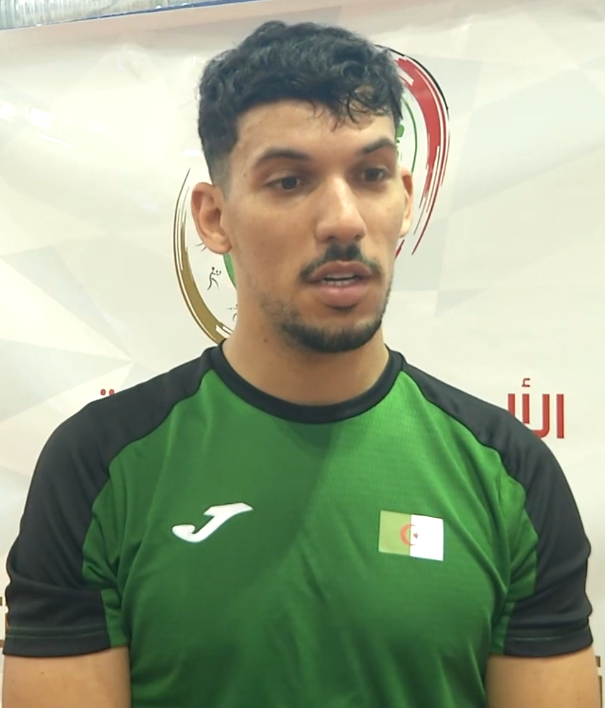
- Medel in 2023

Personal information
- Born: 5 July 1996 (age 30) Algiers, Algeria
- Height: 1.9 m (6 ft 3 in)

Sport
- Country: Algeria
- Sport: Badminton
- Handedness: Left

Men's singles & doubles
- Highest ranking: 116 (MS 27 September 2022); 55 (MD 8 November 2022)
- BWF profile
Medal record
Men's badminton
Representing Algeria
African Games
Gold medal – first place	2023 Accra	Men's doubles
Silver medal – second place	2019 Rabat	Mixed team
African Championships
Gold medal – first place	2017 Benoni	Men's doubles
Gold medal – first place	2019 Port Harcourt	Men's doubles
Gold medal – first place	2020 Cairo	Men's doubles
Gold medal – first place	2021 Kampala	Men's doubles
Gold medal – first place	2022 Kampala	Men's doubles
Gold medal – first place	2024 Cairo	Men's doubles
Gold medal – first place	2025 Douala	Men's doubles
Gold medal – first place	2026 Gaborone	Men's doubles
Silver medal – second place	2018 Algiers	Men's doubles
Bronze medal – third place	2023 Benoni	Men's doubles
Africa Mixed Team Championships
Gold medal – first place	2025 Douala	Mixed team
Silver medal – second place	2021 Kampala	Mixed team
Bronze medal – third place	2023 Benoni	Mixed team
Africa Men's Team Championships
Gold medal – first place	2018 Algiers	Men's team
Gold medal – first place	2020 Cairo	Men's team
Gold medal – first place	2022 Kampala	Men's team
Gold medal – first place	2024 Cairo	Men's team
Gold medal – first place	2026 Gaborone	Men's team
Bronze medal – third place	2016 Rose Hill	Men's team
Mediterranean Games
Gold medal – first place	2022 Oran	Men's doubles
Silver medal – second place	2026 Taranto	Men's doubles
African Youth Games
Silver medal – second place	2014 Gaborone	Boys' doubles
Bronze medal – third place	2014 Gaborone	Boys' singles

Youcef Sabri Medel (born 5 July 1996) is an Algerian badminton player. He won the boys' doubles silver and singles bronze at the 2014 African Youth Games in Gaborone, Botswana. Medel was the gold medalists at the 2017, 2019, 2020, 2021 and 2022 African Championships for men's double with his partner, Koceila Mammeri.

== Achievements ==
=== African Games ===
Mixed doubles
Year	Venue	Partner	Opponent	Score	Result
2023	Borteyman Sports Complex; Accra, Ghana	(Algeria) Koceila Mammeri	(Nigeria) Godwin Olofua (Nigeria) Anuoluwapo Juwon Opeyori	21–6, 21–15	Gold

=== African Championships ===
Men's doubles
Year	Venue	Partner	Opponent	Score	Result
2017	John Barrable Hall, Benoni, South Africa	(Algeria) Koceila Mammeri	(South Africa) Andries Malan (South Africa) James Hilton Mcmanus	13–21, 21–19, 21–9	Gold
2018	Salle OMS Harcha Hacéne, Algiers, Algeria	(Algeria) Koceila Mammeri	(Algeria) Mohamed Abderrahime Belarbi (Algeria) Adel Hamek	18–21, 22–20, 18–21	Silver
2019	Alfred Diete-Spiff Centre, Port Harcourt, Nigeria	(Algeria) Koceila Mammeri	(Nigeria) Enejoh Abah (Nigeria) Isaac Minaphee	21–18, 21–17	Gold
2020	Cairo Stadium Hall 2, Cairo, Egypt	(Algeria) Koceila Mammeri	(Mauritius) Aatish Lubah (Mauritius) Julien Paul	19–21, 21–14, 24–22	Gold
2021	MTN Arena, Kampala, Uganda	(Algeria) Koceila Mammeri	(Egypt) Abdelrahman Abdelhakim (Egypt) Ahmed Salah	21–16, 21–13	Gold
2022	Lugogo Arena, Kampala, Uganda	(Algeria) Koceila Mammeri	(Egypt) Adham Hatem Elgamal (Egypt) Ahmed Salah	21–23, 21–19, 21–18	Gold
2023	John Barrable Hall, Benoni, South Africa	(Algeria) Koceila Mammeri	(South Africa) Jarred Elliott (South Africa) Robert Summers	21–12, 18–21, 19–21	Bronze
2024	Cairo Stadium Indoor Halls Complex, Cairo, Egypt	(Algeria) Koceila Mammeri	(Nigeria) Nusa Momoh (Nigeria) Godwin Olofua	21–12, 21–8	Gold
2025	Gymnase de Japoma, Douala, Cameroon	(Algeria) Koceila Mammeri	(Mauritius) Jean Bernard Bongout (Mauritius) Julien Paul	21–19, 21–9	Gold
2026	Royal Aria, Gaborone, Botswana	(Algeria) Koceila Mammeri	(Zambia) Chongo Mulenga (Zambia) Kalombo Mulenga	21–16, 21–19	Gold

=== Mediterranean Games ===
Men's doubles
Year	Venue	Partner	Opponent	Score	Result	Ref.
2022	Multipurpose Omnisports Hall; Oued Tlélat, Algeria	(Algeria) Koceila Mammeri	(Spain) Pablo Abián (Spain) Luis Enrique Peñalver	14–21, 21–19, 21–16	Gold	

=== African Youth Games ===
Boys' singles
Year	Venue	Opponent	Score	Result
2014	Otse Police College, Gaborone, Botswana	(Nigeria) Kingsley Nelson	15–21, 21–16, 11–21	Bronze

Boys' doubles
Year	Venue	Partner	Opponent	Score	Result
2014	Otse Police College; Gaborone, Botswana	(Algeria) Mohamed Guelmaoui	(Mauritius) Julien Paul (Mauritius) Kounal Soubbaroyan	19–21, 18–21	Silver

=== BWF International Challenge/Series (11 titles, 6 runners-up) ===
Men's singles
Year	Tournament	Opponent	Score	Result
2019	Zambia International	(United States) Timothy Lam	13–21, 7–21	(silver) Runner-up

Men's doubles
Year	Tournament	Partner	Opponent	Score	Result
2019	Kenya International	(Algeria) Koceila Mammeri	(Mauritius) Aatish Lubah (Mauritius) Julien Paul	14–21, 22–20, 21–18	(gold) Winner
2019	Egypt International	(Algeria) Koceila Mammeri	(Poland) Paweł Pietryja (Poland) Jan Rudziński	21–19, 24–22	(gold) Winner
2019	Algeria International	(Algeria) Koceila Mammeri	(Poland) Paweł Pietryja (Poland) Jan Rudziński	21–16, 21–16	(gold) Winner
2019	Zambia International	(Algeria) Koceila Mammeri	(Egypt) Adham Hatem Elgamal (Egypt) Ahmed Salah	22–20, 19–21, 14–21	(silver) Runner-up
2019	South Africa International	(Algeria) Koceila Mammeri	(Egypt) Adham Hatem Elgamal (Egypt) Ahmed Salah	21–17, 21–17	(gold) Winner
2021	Peru International	(Algeria) Koceila Mammeri	(Guatemala) Aníbal Marroquín (Guatemala) Jonathan Solís	21–18, 21–15	(gold) Winner
2023	Brazil International	(Algeria) Koceila Mammeri	(Brazil) Fabrício Farias (Brazil) Davi Silva	21–16, 21–18	(gold) Winner
2023	Cameroon International	(Algeria) Koceila Mammeri	(India) P.S Ravikrishna (India) Sankar Prasad Udayakumar	12–21, 19–21	(silver) Runner-up
2023	Lagos International	(Algeria) Koceila Mammeri	(India) P.S Ravikrishna (India) Sankar Prasad Udayakumar	15–21, 14–21	(silver) Runner-up
2023	Algeria International	(Algeria) Koceila Mammeri	(Algeria) Mohamed Abderrahime Belarbi (Algeria) Adel Hamek	21–13, 27–25	(gold) Winner
2023	Guatemala International	(Algeria) Koceila Mammeri	(Mexico) Job Castillo (Mexico) Luis Montoya	18–21, 17–21	(silver) Runner-up
2023	Zambia International	(Algeria) Koceila Mammeri	(Malaysia) Keane Chok (Malaysia) Andy Kok	21–11, 15–21, 21–13	(gold) Winner
2024	Egypt International	(Algeria) Koceila Mammeri	(Thailand) Kittisak Namdash (Thailand) Samatcha Tovannakasem	21–13, 18–21, 13–21	(silver) Runner-up
2024	Algeria International	(Algeria) Koceila Mammeri	(India) Nithin H. V. (India) Venkata Harsha Vardhan Rayudu Veeramreddy	11–21, 21–9, 23–21	(gold) Winner
2025	Algeria International	(Algeria) Koceila Mammeri	(Belgium) Iljo van Delsen (Belgium) Yaro van Delsen	21–19, 21–18	(gold) Winner
2025	Egypt International	(Algeria) Koceila Mammeri	(Malaysia) Ashraf Zakaria (Malaysia) Ariffin Zakaria	21–5, 21–14	(gold) Winner

BWF International Challenge tournament
BWF International Series tournament
BWF Future Series tournament
