= Anuoluwapo =

- Gender: Male/Female
- Language: Yoruba

Origin
- Origin: Nigeria
- Meaning: The mercy of God is many
- Region of origin: South western Nigeria

Anuoluwapo is a Nigerian given name. It is a unisex name and of Yoruba origin, which means "The mercy of God is plenty."

== Notable individuals with the name ==
- Elijah Anuoluwapo Oluwaferanmi Oluwatomi Oluwalana Ayomikulehin Adebayo (born 1998), English footballer.
- Anuoluwapo Juwon Opeyori (born 1997), Nigerian badminton player.
