= Michell Butler =

Michell Butler may refer to:

- Michelle Butler-Emmett (born 1983), South African badminton player
- Mitchell Butler (born 1970), African-American basketball player and sports agent
