= Robert Summers (badminton) =

South African badminton player (born 2002)

Personal information
- Born: 13 May 2002 (age 24) Kimberley, Northern Cape, South Africa

Sport
- Country: South Africa
- Sport: Badminton
- Handedness: Right

Men's doubles
- Highest ranking: 90 (with Jarred Elliott) (28 August 2023)
- BWF profile
Medal record
Men's badminton
Representing South Africa
African Games
Bronze medal – third place	2023 Accra	Men's doubles
African Championships
Gold medal – first place	2023 Benoni	Men's doubles
Bronze medal – third place	2021 Kampala	Men's doubles
Bronze medal – third place	2023 Benoni	Men's singles
Bronze medal – third place	2021 Kampala	Mixed team
Bronze medal – third place	2023 Benoni	Mixed team
Bronze medal – third place	2025 Douala	Mixed team
Africa Men's Team Championships
Bronze medal – third place	2022 Kampala	Men's team

Robert Summers (born 13 May 2002) is a South African badminton player.

== Career ==
Summers was born in Kimberley, Northern Cape. Introduced to the sport of badminton by his mother as a 4-year-old, he became a part of local club just three years later.

Summers represented his country at the 2022 Commonwealth Games. He won the African Championship in men's doubles with his partner Jarred Elliott in 2023, defeating top two seeded pairs from Algeria in semifinal and final. Both went on to also secure a bronze medal in the African Games a month later.

Summers pursued a law degree and plans to open his own law firm in future. He attended University of the Free State.

== Achievements ==
=== African Games ===
Mixed doubles
Year	Venue	Partner	Opponent	Score	Result
2023	Borteyman Sports Complex; Accra, Ghana	(South Africa) Jarred Elliott	(Nigeria) Godwin Olofua (Nigeria) Anuoluwapo Juwon Opeyori	18–21, 16–21	Bronze

=== African Championships ===
Men's singles
Year	Venue	Opponent	Score	Result
2023	John Barrable Hall; Benoni, South Africa	(Nigeria) Anuoluwapo Juwon Opeyori	19–21, 17–21	Bronze

Men's doubles
Year	Venue	Partner	Opponent	Score	Result
2021	MTN Arena; Kampala, Uganda	(South Africa) Jarred Elliott	(Algeria) Koceila Mammeri (Algeria) Youcef Sabri Medel	16–21, 14–21	Bronze
2023	John Barrable Hall; Benoni, South Africa	(South Africa) Jarred Elliott	(Algeria) Mohamed Abderrahime Belarbi (Algeria) Adel Hamek	21–13, 21–17	Gold

=== BWF International (4 titles, 8 runners-up) ===
Men's singles
Year	Tournament	Opponent	Score	Result
2019	Botswana International	(South Africa) Cameron Coetzer	20–22, 21–15, 14–21	(silver) Runner-up
2021	South Africa International	(India) Aman Sanjay Farogh	21–15, 16–21, 12–21	(silver) Runner-up

Men's doubles
Year	Tournament	Partner	Opponent	Score	Result
2021	Botswana International	(South Africa) Jarred Elliott	(Kazakhstan) Artur Niyazov (Kazakhstan) Dmitriy Panarin	21–19, 13–21, 21–6	(gold) Winner
2021	South Africa International	(South Africa) Jarred Elliott	(South Africa) Caden Kakora (South Africa) Robert White	21–15, 9–21, 21–15	(gold) Winner
2022	Zambia International	(South Africa) Jarred Elliott	(Zambia) Mwanza Edward (Zambia) Timothy Kafunda	21–9, 21–10	(gold) Winner
2022	Botswana International	(South Africa) Jarred Elliott	(Kazakhstan) Artur Niyazov (Kazakhstan) Dmitriy Panarin	20–22, 14–21	(silver) Runner-up
2023	South Africa International	(South Africa) Jarred Elliott	(South Africa) Caden Kakora (South Africa) Robert White	15–21, 20–22	(silver) Runner-up
2024	South Africa International	(South Africa) Dorian James	(Malta) Matthew Abela (Malta) Maxim Grinblat	21–10, 19–21, 20–22	(silver) Runner-up
2025	South Africa International	(South Africa) Caden Kakora	(Australia) Avinash Srinivas (Australia) Ephraim Stephem Sam	walkover	(silver) Runner-up

Mixed doubles
Year	Tournament	Partner	Opponent	Score	Result
2024	South Africa International	(South Africa) Anri Schoonees	(South Africa) Caden Kakora (South Africa) Johanita Scholtz	12–21, 21–23	(silver) Runner-up
2025	Botswana International	(South Africa) Amy Ackerman	(South Africa) Caden Kakora (South Africa) Johanita Scholtz	21–10, 16–21, 21–13	(gold) Winner
2025	South Africa International	(South Africa) Amy Ackerman	(Saudi Arabia) Amer Mohammed (Saudi Arabia) Nabiha Shariff	16–21, 15–9 retired	(silver) Runner-up

BWF International Challenge tournament
BWF International Series tournament
BWF Future Series tournament

=== BWF Junior International ===
Boys' singles
Year	Tournament	Opponent	Score	Result
2018	South Africa Junior International	(South Africa) Caden Kakora	21–14, 21–15	(gold) Winner

Boys' doubles
Year	Tournament	Partner	Opponent	Score	Result
2018	South Africa Junior International	(South Africa) Caden Kakora	(South Africa) Emile Paulus (South Africa) Ryan Armand Swart	21–12, 21–16	(gold) Winner

Mixed doubles
Year	Tournament	Partner	Opponent	Score	Result
2018	South Africa Junior International	(South Africa) Megan De Beer	(South Africa) Emile Paulus (South Africa) Jabulile Geninda	21–10, 21–10	(gold) Winner

BWF Junior International Grand Prix tournament
BWF Junior International Challenge tournament
BWF Junior International Series tournament
BWF Junior Future Series tournament
