= Adham Hatem Elgamal =

Egyptian badminton player (born 1998)

Adham Elgamal
Personal information
- Full name: Adham Hatem Elgamal
- Born: 4 February 1998 (age 28) Cairo, Egypt
- Height: 1.76 m (5 ft 9 in)
- Weight: 63 kg (139 lb)

Sport
- Country: Egypt
- Sport: Badminton
- Coached by: Mohamed Mostafa Kamel

Men's singles & doubles
- Highest ranking: 95 (MS, 27 September 2022); 64 (MD with Ahmed Salah, 17 March 2020); 43 (XD with Doha Hany, 27 September 2022)
- Current ranking: 171 (MS); 106 (XD with Doha Hany) (24 February 2026)
- BWF profile
Medal record
Men's badminton
Representing Egypt
African Games
Silver medal – second place	2019 Rabat	Mixed doubles
Silver medal – second place	2023 Accra	Mixed doubles
Bronze medal – third place	2019 Rabat	Men's doubles
Bronze medal – third place	2019 Rabat	Mixed team
Bronze medal – third place	2023 Accra	Men's singles
Bronze medal – third place	2023 Accra	Men's doubles
African Championships
Gold medal – first place	2020 Cairo	Mixed doubles
Gold medal – first place	2021 Kampala	Men's singles
Gold medal – first place	2026 Gaborone	Men's singles
Silver medal – second place	2021 Kampala	Mixed doubles
Silver medal – second place	2022 Kampala	Men's doubles
Silver medal – second place	2023 Benoni	Mixed doubles
Silver medal – second place	2024 Cairo	Mixed doubles
Silver medal – second place	2025 Douala	Men's singles
Silver medal – second place	2025 Douala	Mixed doubles
Bronze medal – third place	2017 Benoni	Men's doubles
Bronze medal – third place	2017 Benoni	Mixed doubles
Bronze medal – third place	2018 Algiers	Mixed doubles
Bronze medal – third place	2019 Port Harcourt	Mixed doubles
Bronze medal – third place	2020 Cairo	Men's singles
Bronze medal – third place	2022 Kampala	Men's singles
Bronze medal – third place	2024 Cairo	Men's singles
Bronze medal – third place	2026 Gaborone	Mixed doubles
Africa Mixed Team Championships
Gold medal – first place	2017 Benoni	Mixed team
Gold medal – first place	2021 Kampala	Mixed team
Gold medal – first place	2023 Benoni	Mixed team
Bronze medal – third place	2019 Port Harcourt	Mixed team
Bronze medal – third place	2025 Douala	Mixed team
Africa Men's Team Championships
Silver medal – second place	2022 Kampala	Men's team
Bronze medal – third place	2020 Cairo	Men's team
Bronze medal – third place	2024 Cairo	Men's team
Bronze medal – third place	2026 Gaborone	Men's team
Arab Championships
Gold medal – first place	2021 Hamad Town	Mixed doubles
African Youth Games
Bronze medal – third place	2014 Gaborone	Mixed team

Adham Hatem Elgamal (Arabic: ادهم حاتم الجمل, born 4 February 1998) is an Egyptian badminton player. He won the mixed doubles title at the 2020 African Championships together with his partner Doha Hany. Elgamal competed at the 2019 African Games, won a silver in the mixed doubles, and two bronze medals in the team and men's doubles events. He also participated at the 2018 Mediterranean Games, and at the 2020 Summer Olympics.

== Achievements ==
=== African Games ===
Men's singles
Year	Venue	Opponent	Score	Result
2023	Borteyman Sports Complex, Accra, Ghana	(Nigeria) Anuoluwapo Juwon Opeyori	21–15, 11–21, 14–21	Bronze

Men's doubles
Year	Venue	Partner	Opponent	Score	Result
2019	Ain Chock Indoor Sports Center; Casablanca, Morocco	(Egypt) Ahmed Salah	(Mauritius) Aatish Lubah (Mauritius) Julien Paul	14–21, 21–14, 18–21	Bronze
2023	Borteyman Sports Complex; Accra, Ghana	(Egypt) Ahmed Salah	(Algeria) Koceila Mammeri (Algeria) Youcef Sabri Medel	14–21, 19–21	Bronze

Mixed doubles
Year	Venue	Partner	Opponent	Score	Result
2019	Ain Chock Indoor Sports Center; Casablanca, Morocco	(Egypt) Doha Hany	(Algeria) Koceila Mammeri (Algeria) Linda Mazri	19–21, 16–21	Silver
2023	Borteyman Sports Complex; Accra, Ghana	(Egypt) Doha Hany	(Algeria) Koceila Mammeri (Algeria) Tanina Mammeri	11–21, 15–21	Silver

=== African Championships ===
Men's singles
Year	Venue	Opponent	Score	Result
2020	Cairo Stadium Hall 2, Cairo, Egypt	(Nigeria) Anuoluwapo Juwon Opeyori	21–14, 12–21, 12–21	Bronze
2021	MTN Arena, Kampala, Uganda	(Egypt) Ahmed Salah	21–14, 21–14	Gold
2022	Lugogo Arena, Kampala, Uganda	(Uganda) Brian Kasirye	17–21, 21–16, 15–21	Bronze
2024	Cairo Stadium Indoor Halls Complex, Cairo, Egypt	(Mauritius) Julien Paul	13–21, 18–21	Bronze
2025	Gymnase de Japoma, Douala, Cameroon	(Nigeria) Anuoluwapo Juwon Opeyori	7–21, 21–23	Silver
2026	Royal Aria, Gaborone, Botswana	(Mauritius) Jean Bernard Bongout	2–1 (retired)	Gold

Men's doubles
Year	Venue	Partner	Opponent	Score	Result
2017	John Barrable Hall, Benoni, South Africa	(Egypt) Ali Ahmed El Khateeb	(Algeria) Koceila Mammeri (Algeria) Youcef Sabri Medel	21–18, 14–21, 15–21	Bronze
2022	Lugogo Arena, Kampala, Uganda	(Egypt) Ahmed Salah	(Algeria) Koceila Mammeri (Algeria) Youcef Sabri Medel	23–21, 19–21, 18–21	Silver

Mixed doubles
Year	Venue	Partner	Opponent	Score	Result
2017	John Barrable Hall, Benoni, South Africa	(Egypt) Doha Hany	(South Africa) Andries Malan (South Africa) Jennifer Fry	14–21, 12–21	Bronze
2018	Salle OMS Harcha Hacéne, Algiers, Algeria	(Egypt) Doha Hany	(Nigeria) Enejoh Abah (Nigeria) Peace Orji	19–21, 21–23	Bronze
2019	Alfred Diete-Spiff Centre, Port Harcourt, Nigeria	(Egypt) Doha Hany	(Nigeria) Enejoh Abah (Nigeria) Peace Orji	15–21, 12–21	Bronze
2020	Cairo Stadium Hall 2, Cairo, Egypt	(Egypt) Doha Hany	(Algeria) Koceila Mammeri (Algeria) Linda Mazri	21–13, 18–21, 21–19	Gold
2021	MTN Arena Kampala, Uganda	(Egypt) Doha Hany	(Algeria) Koceila Mammeri (Algeria) Tanina Mammeri	10–21, 7–21	Silver
2023	John Barrable Hall, Benoni, South Africa	(Egypt) Doha Hany	(Algeria) Koceila Mammeri (Algeria) Tanina Mammeri	15–21, 13–21	Silver
2024	Cairo Stadium Indoor Halls Complex, Cairo, Egypt	(Egypt) Doha Hany	(Algeria) Koceila Mammeri (Algeria) Tanina Mammeri	23–21, 16–21, 11–21	Silver
2025	Gymnase de Japoma, Douala, Cameroon	(Egypt) Doha Hany	(Algeria) Koceila Mammeri (Algeria) Tanina Mammeri	Walkover	Silver
2026	Royal Aria, Gaborone, Botswana	(Egypt) Doha Hany	(South Africa) Caden Kakora (South Africa) Amy Ackerman	21–19, 18–21, 16–21	Bronze

=== Arab Championships ===
Mixed doubles
Year	Venue	Partner	Opponent	Score	Result
2021	Hamad Town Youth Model Centre; Hamad Town, Bahrain	(Egypt) Doha Hany	(Jordan) Bahaedeen Ahmad Alshannik (Jordan) Domou Amro	21–16, 21–13	Gold

=== BWF International Challenge/Series (10 titles, 14 runners-up) ===
Men's singles
Year	Tournament	Opponent	Score	Result
2013	Ethiopia International	(Zambia) Chongo Mulenga	21–12, 19–21, 18–21	(silver) Runner-up
2022	South Africa International	(Chinese Taipei) Hung Chun-chung	13–21, 22–20, 16–21	(silver) Runner-up
2023	Benin International	(Uganda) Brian Kasirye	21–11, 21–12	(gold) Winner

Men's doubles
Year	Tournament	Partner	Opponent	Score	Result
2013	Ethiopia International	(Egypt) Abdelrahman Abdelhakim	(Ethiopia) Seid Asrar (Ethiopia) Mekonen Gebrelu	21–17, 24–22	(gold) Winner
2013	Morocco International	(Egypt) Abdelrahman Abdelhakim	(India) Vineeth Manuel (India) Arjun Reddy Pochana	12–21, 17–21	(silver) Runner-up
2017	Côte d'Ivoire International	(Egypt) Mohamed Mostafa Kamel	(Jordan) Bahaedeen Ahmad Alshannik (Jordan) Mohd Naser Mansour Nayef	10–21, 16–21	(silver) Runner-up
2017	Cameroon International	(Egypt) Mohamed Mostafa Kamel	(Jordan) Bahaedeen Ahmad Alshannik (Jordan) Mohd Naser Mansour Nayef	12–21, 15–21	(silver) Runner-up
2019	Mauritius International	(Egypt) Ahmed Salah	(Malaysia) Boon Xin Yuan (Malaysia) Yap Qar Siong	16–21, 18–21	(silver) Runner-up
2019	Côte d'Ivoire International	(Egypt) Ahmed Salah	(Nigeria) Godwin Olofua (Nigeria) Anuoluwapo Juwon Opeyori	22–20, 21–19	(gold) Winner
2019	Cameroon International	(Egypt) Ahmed Salah	(Nigeria) Godwin Olofua (Nigeria) Anuoluwapo Juwon Opeyori	12–21, 21–11, 11–21	(silver) Runner-up
2019	Zambia International	(Egypt) Ahmed Salah	(Algeria) Koceila Mammeri (Algeria) Youcef Sabri Medel	20–22, 21–19, 21–14	(gold) Winner
2019	South Africa International	(Egypt) Ahmed Salah	(Algeria) Koceila Mammeri (Algeria) Youcef Sabri Medel	17–21, 17–21	(silver) Runner-up

Mixed doubles
Year	Tournament	Partner	Opponent	Score	Result
2013	Ethiopia International	(Egypt) Naja Mohamed	(Egypt) Abdelrahman Abdelhakim (Egypt) Doha Hany	14–21, 11–21	(silver) Runner-up
2013	Morocco International	(Egypt) Naja Mohamed	(Netherlands) Vincent de Vries (Netherlands) Gayle Mahulette	10–21, 7–21	(silver) Runner-up
2018	Cameroon International	(Egypt) Doha Hany	(Egypt) Ahmed Salah (Egypt) Hadia Hosny	13–21, 21–15, 21–15	(gold) Winner
2019	Algeria International	(Egypt) Doha Hany	(Belgium) Jona van Nieuwkerke (Belgium) Lise Jaques	12–21, 20–22	(silver) Runner-up
2019	Cameroon International	(Egypt) Doha Hany	(Egypt) Ahmed Salah (Egypt) Hadia Hosny	Walkover	(gold) Winner
2019	Zambia International	(Egypt) Doha Hany	(Egypt) Ahmed Salah (Egypt) Hadia Hosny	21–17, 21–17	(gold) Winner
2019	South Africa International	(Egypt) Doha Hany	(South Africa) Jarred Elliott (South Africa) Megan de Beer	21–19, 19–21, 21–17	(gold) Winner
2020	Kenya International	(Egypt) Doha Hany	(Kenya) John Wanyoike (Kenya) Mercy Joseph	21–10, 21–14	(gold) Winner
2022	Botswana International	(Egypt) Doha Hany	(South Africa) Jarred Elliott (South Africa) Amy Ackerman	12–21, 19–21	(silver) Runner-up
2023	Benin International	(Egypt) Doha Hany	(Benin) Oswald Ash Fano-Dosh (Benin) Pernelle Fabossou	21–9, 21–12	(gold) Winner
2023	South Africa International	(Egypt) Doha Hany	(South Africa) Robert White (South Africa) Deidre Laurens	21–10, 17–21, 18–21	(silver) Runner-up
2026	Senegal International	(Egypt) Doha Hany	(Ukraine) Yegor Romaniuk (Poland) Kaja Ziolkowska	14–21, 16–21	(silver) Runner-up

BWF International Challenge tournament
BWF International Series tournament
BWF Future Series tournament
