= Godwin Olofua =

Nigerian badminton player (born 1999)

Personal information
- Born: Godwin Richard Olofua; 18 April 1999 (age 27)
- Height: 1.80 m (5 ft 11 in)
- Weight: 59 kg (130 lb)

Sport
- Country: Nigeria
- Sport: Badminton

Men's singles & doubles
- Highest ranking: 139 (MS 26 November 2019); 49 (MD 23 March 2021)
- BWF profile
Medal record
Men's badminton
Representing Nigeria
African Games
Gold medal – first place	2019 Rabat	Mixed team
Silver medal – second place	2019 Rabat	Men's doubles
Silver medal – second place	2023 Accra	Men's singles
Silver medal – second place	2023 Accra	Men's doubles
Bronze medal – third place	2019 Rabat	Men's singles
African Championships
Gold medal – first place	2019 Port Harcourt	Mixed team
Silver medal – second place	2019 Port Harcourt	Men's singles
Silver medal – second place	2024 Cairo	Men's doubles
Bronze medal – third place	2019 Port Harcourt	Men's doubles
Bronze medal – third place	2020 Cairo	Men's singles
Bronze medal – third place	2020 Cairo	Men's doubles
Africa Team Championships
Silver medal – second place	2018 Algiers	Men's team
Silver medal – second place	2024 Cairo	Men's team

Godwin Richard Olofua (born 18 April 1999) is a Nigerian badminton player who participated at local and international badminton competitions representing Nigeria and has won several trophies. Olofua won gold medal in the mixed team event with silver and bronze medals in singles and doubles events at the 2019 African Championships in Port Harcourt, Nigeria. He also won gold during the 2019 African Games in the mixed team, a silver in the men's doubles and a bronze in the men's singles. Olofua won the men's doubles title at the 2018 Côte d'Ivoire, 2019 Benin and Cameroon International tournaments partnered with Anuoluwapo Juwon Opeyori. He competed at the 2020 Summer Olympics.

== Achievements ==
=== African Games ===
Men's singles
Year	Venue	Opponent	Score	Result
2019	Ain Chock Indoor Sports Center, Casablanca, Morocco	(Mauritius) Julien Paul	17–21, 11–21	Bronze
2023	Borteyman Sports Complex, Accra, Ghana	(Nigeria) Anuoluwapo Juwon Opeyori	23–21, 17–21, 15–21	Silver

Men's doubles
Year	Venue	Partner	Opponent	Score	Result
2019	Ain Chock Indoor Sports Center; Casablanca, Morocco	(Nigeria) Anuoluwapo Juwon Opeyori	(Mauritius) Aatish Lubah (Mauritius) Julien Paul	9–21, 18–21	Silver
2023	Borteyman Sports Complex; Accra, Ghana	(Nigeria) Anuoluwapo Juwon Opeyori	(Algeria) Koceila Mammeri (Algeria) Youcef Sabri Medel	6–21, 15–21	Silver

=== African Championships ===
Men's singles
Year	Venue	Opponent	Score	Result
2019	Alfred Diete-Spiff Centre, Port Harcourt, Nigeria	(Nigeria) Anuoluwapo Juwon Opeyori	17–21, 21–16, 17–21	Silver
2020	Cairo Stadium Hall 2, Cairo, Egypt	(Mauritius) Julien Paul	14–21, 13–21	Bronze

Men's doubles
Year	Venue	Partner	Opponent	Score	Result
2019	Alfred Diete-Spiff Centre; Port Harcourt, Nigeria	(Nigeria) Anuoluwapo Juwon Opeyori	(Algeria) Koceila Mammeri (Algeria) Youcef Sabri Medel	21–18, 16–21, 16–21	Bronze
2020	Cairo Stadium Hall 2 Cairo, Egypt	(Nigeria) Anuoluwapo Juwon Opeyori	(Mauritius) Aatish Lubah (Mauritius) Julien Paul	14–21, 25–27	Bronze
2024	Cairo Stadium Indoor Halls Complex, Cairo, Egypt	(Nigeria) Nusa Momoh	(Algeria) Koceila Mammeri (Algeria) Youcef Sabri Medel	12–21, 8–21	Silver

=== BWF International Challenge/Series (5 titles, 6 runners-up) ===
Men's doubles
Year	Tournament	Partner	Opponent	Score	Result
2017	Lagos International	(Nigeria) Anuoluwapo Juwon Opeyori	(India) Manu Attri (India) B. Sumeeth Reddy	13–21, 15–21	(silver) Runner-up
2018	Côte d'Ivoire International	(Nigeria) Anuoluwapo Juwon Opeyori	(Denmark) Mathias Pedersen (Germany) Jonathan Persson	21–14, 21–19	(gold) Winner
2018	Zambia International	(Nigeria) Anuoluwapo Juwon Opeyori	(Azerbaijan) Ade Resky Dwicahyo (Azerbaijan) Azmy Qowimuramadhoni	19–21, 21–18, 11–21	(silver) Runner-up
2019	Uganda International	(Nigeria) Anuoluwapo Juwon Opeyori	(India) Siddharth Jakhar (Egypt) Ahmed Salah	21–18, 21–11	(gold) Winner
2019	Benin International	(Nigeria) Anuoluwapo Juwon Opeyori	(India) Aravind Kongara (India) Venkatesh Prasad	21–19, 21–19	(gold) Winner
2019	Côte d'Ivoire International	(Nigeria) Anuoluwapo Juwon Opeyori	(Egypt) Adham Hatem Elgamal (Egypt) Ahmed Salah	20–22, 19–21	(silver) Runner-up
2019	Ghana International	(Nigeria) Anuoluwapo Juwon Opeyori	(India) Arjun M. R. (India) Ramchandran Shlok	11–21, 12–21	(silver) Runner-up
2019	Cameroon International	(Nigeria) Anuoluwapo Juwon Opeyori	(Egypt) Adham Hatem Elgamal (Egypt) Ahmed Salah	21–12, 11–21, 21–11	(gold) Winner
2020	Uganda International	(Nigeria) Anuoluwapo Juwon Opeyori	(India) Tarun Kona (India) Shivam Sharma	15–21, 20–22	(silver) Runner-up
2020	Kenya International	(Nigeria) Anuoluwapo Juwon Opeyori	(India) Kathiravun Concheepuran Manivannan (India) Santosh Gajendran	12–21, 17–21	(silver) Runner-up
2023	Benin International	(Nigeria) Ogunsanwo David Oluwasegun	(Nigeria) Joseph Emmanuel Emmy (Nigeria) Victor Ikechukwu	22–20, 21–10	(gold) Winner

BWF International Challenge tournament
BWF International Series tournament
BWF Future Series tournament
