= Benin International =

Badminton championships

The Benin International is an international badminton tournament held in Benin. The event is part of the Badminton World Federation's Future Series and part of the Badminton Confederation of Africa's Circuit.

== Host cities ==
- 2017–2019, 2021: Cotonou
- 2022–: Ouidah

== Past winners ==
Year	Men's singles	Women's singles	Men's doubles	Women's doubles	Mixed doubles
2017	(India) Sahil Sipani	(Nigeria) Dorcas Ajoke Adesokan	(Nigeria) Enejoh Abah (Nigeria) Ibrahim Adamu	(Nigeria) Dorcas Ajoke Adesokan (Nigeria) Tosin Damilola Atolagbe	(Nigeria) Enejoh Abah (Nigeria) Peace Orji
2018	(Belgium) Maxime Moreels	(Benin) Pascaline Ludoskine Yeno Vitou	(Benin) Gbenoukpo Sebastiano Dégbe (Benin) Tobiloba Oyewolé	(Benin) Xena Arisa (Benin) Adjele Joeline Degbey	(Benin) Tobiloba Oyewolé (Benin) Xena Arisa
2019	(Sri Lanka) Niluka Karunaratne	(Myanmar) Thet Htar Thuzar	(Nigeria) Godwin Olofua (Nigeria) Anuoluwapo Juwon Opeyori	(Peru) Daniela Macías (Peru) Dánica Nishimura	(United States) Howard Shu (United States) Paula Lynn Obañana
2020	Cancelled (Note: This tournament, originally to be played from 16 to 19 September, was later cancelled due to the COVID-19 pandemic in Benin.)				
2021	(India) Farogh Sanjay Aman	(South Africa) Johanita Scholtz	(Nigeria) Gideon Babalola (Nigeria) Habeeb Temitope Bello	(South Africa) Demi Botha (South Africa) Deidre Laurens Jordaan	(South Africa) Jarred Elliott (South Africa) Deidre Laurens Jordaan
2022	(Malaysia) Ong Zhen Yi	(Malaysia) Loh Zhi Wei	(Philippines) Christian Bernardo (Philippines) Alvin Morada	(Philippines) Alyssa Ysabel Leonardo (Philippines) Thea Marie Pomar	(Philippines) Alvin Morada (Philippines) Alyssa Ysabel Leonardo
2023	(Egypt) Adham Hatem Elgamal	(South Africa) Johanita Scholtz	(Nigeria) Ogunsanwo David Oluwasegun (Nigeria) Godwin Olofua	(Uganda) Husina Kobugabe (Uganda) Gladys Mbabazi	(Egypt) Adham Hatem Elgamal (Egypt) Doha Hany
2024	No competition				

== Performances by nation ==
As of 2023 edition

Pos	Nation	MS	WS	MD	WD	XD	Total
1	Nigeria	0	1	4	1	1	7
2	Benin	0	1	1	1	1	4
2	South Africa	0	2	0	1	1	4
4	Philippines	0	0	1	1	1	3
5	Egypt	1	0	0	0	1	2
5	India	2	0	0	0	0	2
5	Malaysia	1	1	0	0	0	2
8	Belgium	1	0	0	0	0	1
8	Myanmar	0	1	0	0	0	1
8	Peru	0	0	0	1	0	1
8	Sri Lanka	1	0	0	0	0	1
8	Uganda	0	0	0	1	0	1
8	United States	0	0	0	0	1	1
Total		6	6	6	6	6	30
