= Anuoluwapo Juwon Opeyori =

Nigerian badminton player (born 1997)

Personal information
- Born: 1 June 1997 (age 29) Lagos, Nigeria
- Height: 1.80 m (5 ft 11 in)
- Weight: 65 kg (143 lb)

Sport
- Country: Nigeria
- Sport: Badminton

Men's singles & doubles
- Highest ranking: 86 (MS, 5 September 2023); 48 (MD with Godwin Olofua, 19 October 2021)
- Current ranking: 109 (MS, 18 February 2025)
- BWF profile
Medal record
Men's badminton
Representing Nigeria
African Games
Gold medal – first place	2019 Rabat	Men's singles
Gold medal – first place	2019 Rabat	Mixed team
Gold medal – first place	2023 Accra	Men's singles
Silver medal – second place	2019 Rabat	Men's doubles
Silver medal – second place	2023 Accra	Men's doubles
African Championships
Gold medal – first place	2019 Port Harcourt	Men's singles
Gold medal – first place	2022 Kampala	Men's singles
Gold medal – first place	2023 Benoni	Men's singles
Gold medal – first place	2024 Cairo	Men's singles
Gold medal – first place	2025 Douala	Men's singles
Silver medal – second place	2020 Cairo	Men's singles
Bronze medal – third place	2019 Port Harcourt	Men's doubles
Bronze medal – third place	2020 Cairo	Men's doubles
Africa Mixed Team Championships
Gold medal – first place	2019 Port Harcourt	Mixed team
Africa Men's Team Championships
Silver medal – second place	2018 Algiers	Men's team
Silver medal – second place	2024 Cairo	Men's team

Anuoluwapo Juwon Opeyori (born 1 June 1997) is a Nigerian badminton player. He started playing badminton together with his brother in 2005, and later he was selected to join Nigeria senior national team in 2017. He was fifth-time gold medalists in the men's singles at the African Championships, as well two-time gold medalists in the African Games. He competed at the 2020 Tokyo, and 2024 Paris Olympics, where he was assigned as a country team captain and also flag bearer during the Paris Olympics parade of nations.

== Achievements ==
=== African Games ===
Men's singles
Year	Venue	Opponent	Score	Result	Ref.
2019	Ain Chock Indoor Sports Center, Casablanca, Morocco	(Mauritius) Julien Paul	21–16, 21–17	Gold	
2023	Borteyman Sports Complex, Accra, Ghana	(Nigeria) Godwin Olofua	21–23, 21–17, 21–15	Gold	

Men's doubles
Year	Venue	Partner	Opponent	Score	Result	Ref.
2019	Ain Chock Indoor Sports Center; Casablanca, Morocco	(Nigeria) Godwin Olofua	(Mauritius) Aatish Lubah (Mauritius) Julien Paul	9–21, 18–21	Silver	
2023	Borteyman Sports Complex; Accra, Ghana	(Nigeria) Godwin Olofua	(Algeria) Koceila Mammeri (Algeria) Youcef Sabri Medel	6–21, 15–21	Silver	

=== African Championships ===
Men's singles
Year	Venue	Opponent	Score	Result	Ref.
2019	Alfred Diete-Spiff Centre, Port Harcourt, Nigeria	(Nigeria) Godwin Olofua	21–17, 16–21, 21–17	Gold	
2020	Cairo Stadium Hall 2, Cairo, Egypt	(Mauritius) Julien Paul	21–16, 16–21, 21–23	Silver	
2022	Lugogo Arena, Kampala, Uganda	(Uganda) Brian Kasirye	21–14, 23–21	Gold	
2023	John Barrable Hall, Benoni, South Africa	(Mauritius) Julien Paul	18–21, 21–13, 21–18	Gold	
2024	Cairo Stadium Indoor Halls Complex, Cairo, Egypt	(Mauritius) Julien Paul	23–21, 11–21, 21–16	Gold	
2025	Gymnase de Japoma, Douala, Cameroon	(Egypt) Adham Hatem Elgamal	21–7, 23–21	Gold	

Men's doubles
Year	Venue	Partner	Opponent	Score	Result	Ref.
2019	Alfred Diete-Spiff Centre; Port Harcourt, Nigeria	(Nigeria) Godwin Olofua	(Algeria) Koceila Mammeri (Algeria) Youcef Sabri Medel	21–18, 16–21, 16–21	Bronze	
2020	Cairo Stadium Hall 2 Cairo, Egypt	(Nigeria) Godwin Olofua	(Mauritius) Aatish Lubah (Mauritius) Julien Paul	14–21, 25–27	Bronze	

=== BWF International Challenge/Series (6 titles, 9 runners-up) ===
Men's singles
Year	Tournament	Opponent	Score	Result
2017	Côte d'Ivoire International	(Jordan) Bahaedeen Ahmad Alshannik	21–18, 21–16	(gold) Winner
2018	Zambia International	(Azerbaijan) Ade Resky Dwicahyo	11–21, 20–22	(silver) Runner-up
2020	Kenya International	(India) Chirag Sen	18–21, 8–21	(silver) Runner-up
2022	Zambia International	(Kazakhstan) Dmitriy Panarin	9–21, 10–21	(silver) Runner-up

Men's doubles
Year	Tournament	Partner	Opponent	Score	Result
2017	Lagos International	(Nigeria) Godwin Olofua	(India) Manu Attri (India) B. Sumeeth Reddy	13–21, 15–21	(silver) Runner-up
2018	Côte d'Ivoire International	(Nigeria) Godwin Olofua	(Denmark) Mathias Pedersen (Germany) Jonathan Persson	21–14, 21–19	(gold) Winner
2018	Zambia International	(Nigeria) Godwin Olofua	(Azerbaijan) Ade Resky Dwicahyo (Azerbaijan) Azmy Qowimuramadhoni	19–21, 21–18, 11–21	(silver) Runner-up
2019	Uganda International	(Nigeria) Godwin Olofua	(India) Siddharth Jakhar (Egypt) Ahmed Salah	21–18, 21–11	(gold) Winner
2019	Benin International	(Nigeria) Godwin Olofua	(India) Aravind Kongara (India) Venkatesh Prasad	21–19, 21–19	(gold) Winner
2019	Côte d'Ivoire International	(Nigeria) Godwin Olofua	(Egypt) Adham Hatem Elgamal (Egypt) Ahmed Salah	20–22, 19–21	(silver) Runner-up
2019	Ghana International	(Nigeria) Godwin Olofua	(India) Arjun M. R. (India) Ramchandran Shlok	11–21, 12–21	(silver) Runner-up
2019	Cameroon International	(Nigeria) Godwin Olofua	(Egypt) Adham Hatem Elgamal (Egypt) Ahmed Salah	21–12, 11–21, 21–11	(gold) Winner
2020	Uganda International	(Nigeria) Godwin Olofua	(India) Tarun Kona (India) Shivam Sharma	15–21, 20–22	(silver) Runner-up
2020	Kenya International	(Nigeria) Godwin Olofua	(India) Kathiravun Concheepuran Manivannan (India) Santosh Gajendran	12–21, 17–21	(silver) Runner-up

Mixed doubles
Year	Tournament	Partner	Opponent	Score	Result
2018	Zambia International	(Nigeria) Dorcas Ajoke Adesokan	(Jordan) Bahaedeen Ahmad Alshannik (Jordan) Domou Amro	21–19, 23–21	(gold) Winner

BWF International Challenge tournament
BWF International Series tournament
BWF Future Series tournament

Olympic Games
Preceded by Seun Adigun	Flag bearer for Nigeria; Paris 2024 with Tobi Amusan	Succeeded by Incumbent
