= Cameron Coetzer =

South African badminton player (born 1995)

Personal information
- Born: 7 November 1995 (age 31) East London, South Africa
- Height: 1.79 m (5 ft 10 in)
- Weight: 82 kg (181 lb)

Sport
- Country: South Africa
- Sport: Badminton

Men's singles & doubles
- Highest ranking: 320 (MS 18 February 2020); 239 (MD 18 February 2020); 133 (XD 5 November 2015)
- BWF profile
Medal record
Men's badminton
Representing South Africa
African Championships
| Silver medal – second place | 2017 Benoni | Mixed team |
| Bronze medal – third place | 2023 Benoni | Mixed team |
All Africa Men's Team Championships
| Gold medal – first place | 2016 Rose Hill | Men's team |
| Bronze medal – third place | 2020 Cairo | Men's team |
| Bronze medal – third place | 2022 Kampala | Men's team |

Cameron Coetzer (born 7 November 1995) is a South African badminton player. He competed at the 2018 Commonwealth Games in Gold Coast, Australia.

== Achievements ==
=== BWF International Challenge/Series (2 titles, 2 runners-up) ===
Men's singles
| Year | Tournament | Opponent | Score | Result |
|---|---|---|---|---|
| 2019 | Botswana International | (South Africa) Robert Summers | 22–20, 15–21, 21–14 | (gold) Winner |

Men's doubles
| Year | Tournament | Partner | Opponent | Score | Result |
|---|---|---|---|---|---|
| 2019 | Botswana International | (South Africa) Jarred Elliott | (South Africa) Jason Mann (South Africa) Bongani von Bodenstein | 18–21, 19–21 | (silver) Runner-up |

Mixed doubles
| Year | Tournament | Partner | Opponent | Score | Result |
|---|---|---|---|---|---|
| 2014 | South Africa International | (South Africa) Michelle Butler-Emmett | (South Africa) Prakash Vijayanath (South Africa) Stacey Doubell | 25–23, 19–21, 21–15 | (gold) Winner |
| 2021 | Benin International | (South Africa) Amy Ackerman | (South Africa) Jarred Elliott (South Africa) Deidre Laurens Jordaan | 17–21, 20–22 | (silver) Runner-up |

BWF International Challenge tournament
BWF International Series tournament
BWF Future Series tournament
