= Borteyman Sports Complex =

Multidisciplinary sport complex in Ghana

- Interactive map of Borteyman Sports Complex
- Address: Borteyman; Ghana
- Capacity: 5000

Construction
- Opened: 13 February 2024
- Cost: $145 million

Borteyman Sports Complex is a multidisciplinary sport center located in Borteyman, a suburb of Accra, Ghana. It was commissioned by President Nana Addo Dankwa Akuffo-Addo, the President of Ghana on February 13, 2024 ahead of the 13th Africa Games to be hosted in Ghana.

== Construction ==
Construction of the Borteyman Sports Complex began in 2021. Initially, the plan was to construct a 50,000 capacity stadium. However, these plans were later shelved due to time constraints. The cost of construction of the sports complex was $145 million and could rise to $190 million if educational facilities are added, in a move to convert it into a University of Sports for Development after the Africa Games.

== Overview ==
In 2021, the president of the Republic of Ghana, His Excellency Nana Addo Dankwa Akufo-Addo cut sod for the construction of the state-of-the-art sporting facility and commissioned it on 13 February 2024. Ghana won the bid to host the 13th All African Games in 2018, the University of Ghana, Legon will also host other games.

The Borteyman Sports Complex features a 1,000-seater swimming pool with a 10-lane competition pool and an eight-lane warm-up pool. The facility includes a 1,000-seater multi-purpose sports hall suitable for basketball, badminton, boxing, table tennis and weightlifting with a 500 temporary seater dome for handball, volleyball, judo, karate and taekwondo.

The complex also has a six-lane warm up athletics extract, one FIFA standard football training pitch and a six kilometers single lane road with a three kilometer double lane road.

The facility would be transformed to University of Sport for Development after the 13th All African Games.

== Facilities ==
The Borteyman Sports Complex can accommodate seven competitive sports, including table tennis, handball, tennis, volleyball, swimming, badminton, and the triathlon.

It features a 1,000-seater capacity swimming pool, comprising a 10-lane competition swimming pool and an eight-lane warm-up swimming pool, alongside a multi-purpose Sports Hall capable of seating 1,000 spectators for various events such as basketball, badminton, netball, table tennis, and weightlifting.

== See also ==
- Ghana National Theatre
- Accra Sports Stadium
- Azumah Nelson Sports Complex
