= Cairo Stadium Indoor Halls Complex =

Sports venue

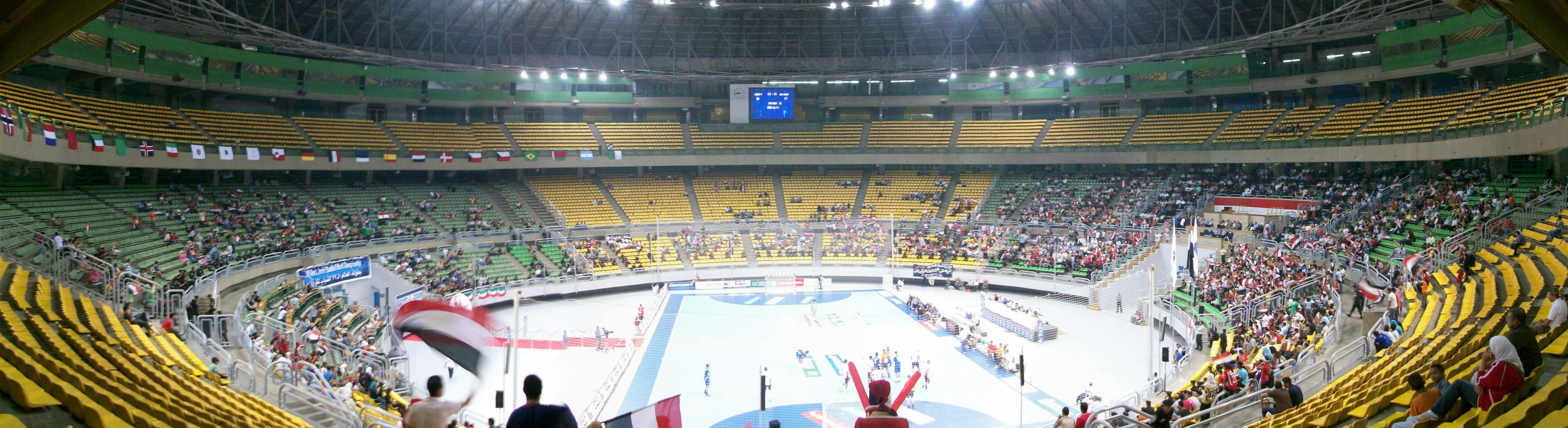
- The Main Hall, the largest venue in the complex (2009)
- Interactive map of Cairo Stadium Indoor Halls Complex
- Full name: Cairo Stadium Indoor Halls Complex
- Location: Cairo, Egypt
- Coordinates: 30.070092°N 31.307098°E
- Capacity: 16,900 (Main Hall); 1,620 (Hall 2); 720 (Hall 3 and 4)

Construction
- Built: 1990–91
- Opened: 1991; 35 years ago
- Cost: £E248 million
- Main contractors: Egyptian Ministry of Youth and Sports

Tenant
- Gezira (basketball) (Hall 2)

Cairo Stadium Indoor Halls Complex (Arabic: مجمع الصالات المغطاة باستاد القاهرة الدولي), built in 1991, consists of four multi-use indoor sporting arenas located near the Cairo International Stadium in Cairo, Egypt. The seating capacity of The Main Hall (also known as The Covered Hall), which is primarily used for sports, is 16,900 spectators.

== Construction ==
The complex was completed in September 1991. In 2016, the halls were equipped with an LED lighting system.

== Events ==
The Main Hall is used for events like badminton, basketball, handball, volleyball, international conferences, parties, and trade fairs. It was built in time for the 1991 All-Africa Games. It hosted the first FIBA U19 Basketball World Cup on African soil. It is one of the 2020 BAL season venues.

Other sporting events held at the Complex include:

- 1999 World Men's Handball Championship
- 2005 World Judo Championships
- 2021 World Men's Handball Championship

== See also ==
- List of indoor arenas in Egypt
- List of indoor arenas by capacity
