= 2023 BWF season =

Badminton World Federation circuit

Details
- Duration: 10 January – 17 December
- Edition: 17th
- Tournaments: 132
- Categories: Grade 1 – (Individuals, Mixed Teams): 2; Grade 2 – BWF World Tour Finals: 1; Grade 2 – Super 1000: 4; Grade 2 – Super 750: 6; Grade 2 – Super 500: 9; Grade 2 – Super 300: 11; Grade 2 – Super 100: 9; Grade 3 – International Challenge: 34; Grade 3 – International Series: 32; Grade 3 – Future Series: 22; Continental Championships: 11; Multisport: 6

Achievements (singles)

Awards
- Player of the year: (South Korea) Seo Seung-jae (Male) (South Korea) An Se-young (Female) (China) Chen Qingchen (Pair) (China) Jia Yifan (Pair)

The 2023 BWF season is the overall badminton circuit organized by the Badminton World Federation (BWF) for the 2023 badminton season. The world badminton tournament in 2023 consists of:
1. BWF tournaments (Grade 1; Major Events)

- BWF World Mixed Team Championships (Sudirman Cup)
- BWF World Championships

2. BWF World Tour (Grade 2)

- Level 1 (BWF World Tour Finals)
- Level 2 (BWF World Tour Super 1000)
- Level 3 (BWF World Tour Super 750)
- Level 4 (BWF World Tour Super 500)
- Level 5 (BWF World Tour Super 300)
- Level 6 (BWF Tour Super 100)

3. Continental Circuit (Grade 3) BWF Open Tournaments: BWF International Challenge, BWF International Series, and BWF Future Series.

The Sudirman Cup is mixed teams event. The others – Super 1000, Super 750, Super 500, Super 300, Super 100, International Challenge, International Series, and Future Series are all individual tournaments. The higher the level of tournament, the larger the prize money and the more ranking points available.

The 2023 BWF season calendar comprises these six levels of BWF tournaments.

== Schedule ==
This is the complete schedule of events on the 2023 calendar, with the champions and runners-up documented.

Key

World Championships
World Tour Finals
Super 1000
Super 750
Super 500
Super 300
Super 100
International Challenge
International Series
Future Series
Continental events/Team Events

=== January ===
Week commencing	Tournament	Champions	Runners-up
9 January	Malaysia Open (Draw): Host: Kuala Lumpur, Malaysia; Venue: Axiata Arena; Level: Super 1000; Prize: $1,250,000; Format: 32MS/32WS/32MD/32WD/32XD	(Denmark) Viktor Axelsen	(Japan) Kodai Naraoka
9 January	Malaysia Open (Draw): Host: Kuala Lumpur, Malaysia; Venue: Axiata Arena; Level: Super 1000; Prize: $1,250,000; Format: 32MS/32WS/32MD/32WD/32XD	Score: 21–6, 21–15	
9 January	Malaysia Open (Draw): Host: Kuala Lumpur, Malaysia; Venue: Axiata Arena; Level: Super 1000; Prize: $1,250,000; Format: 32MS/32WS/32MD/32WD/32XD	(Japan) Akane Yamaguchi	(South Korea) An Se-young
9 January	Malaysia Open (Draw): Host: Kuala Lumpur, Malaysia; Venue: Axiata Arena; Level: Super 1000; Prize: $1,250,000; Format: 32MS/32WS/32MD/32WD/32XD	Score: 12–21, 21–19, 21–11	
9 January	Malaysia Open (Draw): Host: Kuala Lumpur, Malaysia; Venue: Axiata Arena; Level: Super 1000; Prize: $1,250,000; Format: 32MS/32WS/32MD/32WD/32XD	(Indonesia) Fajar Alfian (Indonesia) Muhammad Rian Ardianto	(China) Liang Weikeng (China) Wang Chang
9 January	Malaysia Open (Draw): Host: Kuala Lumpur, Malaysia; Venue: Axiata Arena; Level: Super 1000; Prize: $1,250,000; Format: 32MS/32WS/32MD/32WD/32XD	Score: 21–18, 18–21, 21–13	
9 January	Malaysia Open (Draw): Host: Kuala Lumpur, Malaysia; Venue: Axiata Arena; Level: Super 1000; Prize: $1,250,000; Format: 32MS/32WS/32MD/32WD/32XD	(China) Chen Qingchen (China) Jia Yifan	(South Korea) Baek Ha-na (South Korea) Lee Yu-lim
9 January	Malaysia Open (Draw): Host: Kuala Lumpur, Malaysia; Venue: Axiata Arena; Level: Super 1000; Prize: $1,250,000; Format: 32MS/32WS/32MD/32WD/32XD	Score: 21–16, 21–10	
9 January	Malaysia Open (Draw): Host: Kuala Lumpur, Malaysia; Venue: Axiata Arena; Level: Super 1000; Prize: $1,250,000; Format: 32MS/32WS/32MD/32WD/32XD	(China) Zheng Siwei (China) Huang Yaqiong	(Japan) Yuta Watanabe (Japan) Arisa Higashino
9 January	Malaysia Open (Draw): Host: Kuala Lumpur, Malaysia; Venue: Axiata Arena; Level: Super 1000; Prize: $1,250,000; Format: 32MS/32WS/32MD/32WD/32XD	Score: 21–19, 21–11	
9 January	Estonian International: Host: Tallinn, Estonia; Venue: Kalevi Spordihall; Level: International Series; Prize: $5,000; Format: 32MS/32WS/32MD/32WD/32XD	(Japan) Yushi Tanaka	(France) Alex Lanier
9 January	Estonian International: Host: Tallinn, Estonia; Venue: Kalevi Spordihall; Level: International Series; Prize: $5,000; Format: 32MS/32WS/32MD/32WD/32XD	Score: 21–13, 15–21, 21–12	
9 January	Estonian International: Host: Tallinn, Estonia; Venue: Kalevi Spordihall; Level: International Series; Prize: $5,000; Format: 32MS/32WS/32MD/32WD/32XD	(Chinese Taipei) Huang Yu-hsun	(Estonia) Kristin Kuuba
9 January	Estonian International: Host: Tallinn, Estonia; Venue: Kalevi Spordihall; Level: International Series; Prize: $5,000; Format: 32MS/32WS/32MD/32WD/32XD	Score: 13–21, 21–11, 21–11	
9 January	Estonian International: Host: Tallinn, Estonia; Venue: Kalevi Spordihall; Level: International Series; Prize: $5,000; Format: 32MS/32WS/32MD/32WD/32XD	(Japan) Shuntaro Mezaki (Japan) Haruya Nishida	(France) Julien Maio (France) William Villeger
9 January	Estonian International: Host: Tallinn, Estonia; Venue: Kalevi Spordihall; Level: International Series; Prize: $5,000; Format: 32MS/32WS/32MD/32WD/32XD	Score: 21–19, 21–14	
9 January	Estonian International: Host: Tallinn, Estonia; Venue: Kalevi Spordihall; Level: International Series; Prize: $5,000; Format: 32MS/32WS/32MD/32WD/32XD	(United States) Paula Lynn Cao Hok (United States) Lauren Lam	(Sweden) Moa Sjöö (Sweden) Tilda Sjöö
9 January	Estonian International: Host: Tallinn, Estonia; Venue: Kalevi Spordihall; Level: International Series; Prize: $5,000; Format: 32MS/32WS/32MD/32WD/32XD	Score: 21–10, 21–11	
9 January	Estonian International: Host: Tallinn, Estonia; Venue: Kalevi Spordihall; Level: International Series; Prize: $5,000; Format: 32MS/32WS/32MD/32WD/32XD	(Denmark) Mads Vestergaard (Denmark) Christine Busch	(Germany) Malik Bourakkadi (Germany) Leona Michalski
9 January	Estonian International: Host: Tallinn, Estonia; Venue: Kalevi Spordihall; Level: International Series; Prize: $5,000; Format: 32MS/32WS/32MD/32WD/32XD	Score: 21–13, 21–10	
16 January	India Open (Draw): Host: New Delhi, India; Venue: K. D. Jadhav Indoor Stadium; Level: Super 750; Prize: $900,000; Format: 32MS/32WS/32MD/32WD/32XD	(Thailand) Kunlavut Vitidsarn	(Denmark) Viktor Axelsen
16 January	India Open (Draw): Host: New Delhi, India; Venue: K. D. Jadhav Indoor Stadium; Level: Super 750; Prize: $900,000; Format: 32MS/32WS/32MD/32WD/32XD	Score: 22–20, 10–21, 21–12	
16 January	India Open (Draw): Host: New Delhi, India; Venue: K. D. Jadhav Indoor Stadium; Level: Super 750; Prize: $900,000; Format: 32MS/32WS/32MD/32WD/32XD	(South Korea) An Se-young	(Japan) Akane Yamaguchi
16 January	India Open (Draw): Host: New Delhi, India; Venue: K. D. Jadhav Indoor Stadium; Level: Super 750; Prize: $900,000; Format: 32MS/32WS/32MD/32WD/32XD	Score: 15–21, 21–16, 21–12	
16 January	India Open (Draw): Host: New Delhi, India; Venue: K. D. Jadhav Indoor Stadium; Level: Super 750; Prize: $900,000; Format: 32MS/32WS/32MD/32WD/32XD	(China) Liang Weikeng (China) Wang Chang	(Malaysia) Aaron Chia (Malaysia) Soh Wooi Yik
16 January	India Open (Draw): Host: New Delhi, India; Venue: K. D. Jadhav Indoor Stadium; Level: Super 750; Prize: $900,000; Format: 32MS/32WS/32MD/32WD/32XD	Score: 14–21, 21–19, 21–18	
16 January	India Open (Draw): Host: New Delhi, India; Venue: K. D. Jadhav Indoor Stadium; Level: Super 750; Prize: $900,000; Format: 32MS/32WS/32MD/32WD/32XD	(Japan) Nami Matsuyama (Japan) Chiharu Shida	(China) Chen Qingchen (China) Jia Yifan
16 January	India Open (Draw): Host: New Delhi, India; Venue: K. D. Jadhav Indoor Stadium; Level: Super 750; Prize: $900,000; Format: 32MS/32WS/32MD/32WD/32XD	Score: Walkover	
16 January	India Open (Draw): Host: New Delhi, India; Venue: K. D. Jadhav Indoor Stadium; Level: Super 750; Prize: $900,000; Format: 32MS/32WS/32MD/32WD/32XD	(Japan) Yuta Watanabe (Japan) Arisa Higashino	(China) Wang Yilyu (China) Huang Dongping
16 January	India Open (Draw): Host: New Delhi, India; Venue: K. D. Jadhav Indoor Stadium; Level: Super 750; Prize: $900,000; Format: 32MS/32WS/32MD/32WD/32XD	Score: Walkover	
23 January	Indonesia Masters (Draw): Host: Jakarta, Indonesia; Venue: Istora Gelora Bung Karno; Level: Super 500; Prize: $420,000; Format: 32MS/32WS/32MD/32WD/32XD	(Indonesia) Jonatan Christie	(Indonesia) Chico Aura Dwi Wardoyo
23 January	Indonesia Masters (Draw): Host: Jakarta, Indonesia; Venue: Istora Gelora Bung Karno; Level: Super 500; Prize: $420,000; Format: 32MS/32WS/32MD/32WD/32XD	Score: 21–15, 21–13	
23 January	Indonesia Masters (Draw): Host: Jakarta, Indonesia; Venue: Istora Gelora Bung Karno; Level: Super 500; Prize: $420,000; Format: 32MS/32WS/32MD/32WD/32XD	(South Korea) An Se-young	(Spain) Carolina Marín
23 January	Indonesia Masters (Draw): Host: Jakarta, Indonesia; Venue: Istora Gelora Bung Karno; Level: Super 500; Prize: $420,000; Format: 32MS/32WS/32MD/32WD/32XD	Score: 18–21, 21–18, 21–13	
23 January	Indonesia Masters (Draw): Host: Jakarta, Indonesia; Venue: Istora Gelora Bung Karno; Level: Super 500; Prize: $420,000; Format: 32MS/32WS/32MD/32WD/32XD	(Indonesia) Leo Rolly Carnando (Indonesia) Daniel Marthin	(China) He Jiting (China) Zhou Haodong
23 January	Indonesia Masters (Draw): Host: Jakarta, Indonesia; Venue: Istora Gelora Bung Karno; Level: Super 500; Prize: $420,000; Format: 32MS/32WS/32MD/32WD/32XD	Score: 21–17, 21–16	
23 January	Indonesia Masters (Draw): Host: Jakarta, Indonesia; Venue: Istora Gelora Bung Karno; Level: Super 500; Prize: $420,000; Format: 32MS/32WS/32MD/32WD/32XD	(China) Liu Shengshu (China) Zhang Shuxian	(Japan) Yuki Fukushima (Japan) Sayaka Hirota
23 January	Indonesia Masters (Draw): Host: Jakarta, Indonesia; Venue: Istora Gelora Bung Karno; Level: Super 500; Prize: $420,000; Format: 32MS/32WS/32MD/32WD/32XD	Score: 22–20, 21–19	
23 January	Indonesia Masters (Draw): Host: Jakarta, Indonesia; Venue: Istora Gelora Bung Karno; Level: Super 500; Prize: $420,000; Format: 32MS/32WS/32MD/32WD/32XD	(China) Feng Yanzhe (China) Huang Dongping	(China) Jiang Zhenbang (China) Wei Yaxin
23 January	Indonesia Masters (Draw): Host: Jakarta, Indonesia; Venue: Istora Gelora Bung Karno; Level: Super 500; Prize: $420,000; Format: 32MS/32WS/32MD/32WD/32XD	Score: 21–15, 16–21, 21–19	
23 January	Iceland International: Host: Reykjavík, Iceland; Venue: Tennis- og Badmintonfélag Reykjavíkur; Level: Future Series; Format: 32MS/32WS/32MD/32WD/32XD	(Germany) Matthias Kicklitz	(Denmark) Karan Rajan Rajarajan
23 January	Iceland International: Host: Reykjavík, Iceland; Venue: Tennis- og Badmintonfélag Reykjavíkur; Level: Future Series; Format: 32MS/32WS/32MD/32WD/32XD	Score: 18–21, 21–16, 21–7	
23 January	Iceland International: Host: Reykjavík, Iceland; Venue: Tennis- og Badmintonfélag Reykjavíkur; Level: Future Series; Format: 32MS/32WS/32MD/32WD/32XD	(Denmark) Frederikke Lund	(Azerbaijan) Keisha Fatimah Azzahra
23 January	Iceland International: Host: Reykjavík, Iceland; Venue: Tennis- og Badmintonfélag Reykjavíkur; Level: Future Series; Format: 32MS/32WS/32MD/32WD/32XD	Score: 16–21, 21–19, 22–20	
23 January	Iceland International: Host: Reykjavík, Iceland; Venue: Tennis- og Badmintonfélag Reykjavíkur; Level: Future Series; Format: 32MS/32WS/32MD/32WD/32XD	(Denmark) Jonas Kudsk (Denmark) Jeppe Søby	(England) Alex Green (England) Brandon Yap
23 January	Iceland International: Host: Reykjavík, Iceland; Venue: Tennis- og Badmintonfélag Reykjavíkur; Level: Future Series; Format: 32MS/32WS/32MD/32WD/32XD	Score: 21–9, 21–17	
23 January	Iceland International: Host: Reykjavík, Iceland; Venue: Tennis- og Badmintonfélag Reykjavíkur; Level: Future Series; Format: 32MS/32WS/32MD/32WD/32XD	(England) Abbygael Harris (England) Annie Lado	(Italy) Katharina Fink (Italy) Yasmine Hamza
23 January	Iceland International: Host: Reykjavík, Iceland; Venue: Tennis- og Badmintonfélag Reykjavíkur; Level: Future Series; Format: 32MS/32WS/32MD/32WD/32XD	Score: 21–13, 21–18	
23 January	Iceland International: Host: Reykjavík, Iceland; Venue: Tennis- og Badmintonfélag Reykjavíkur; Level: Future Series; Format: 32MS/32WS/32MD/32WD/32XD	(England) Brandon Yap (England) Annie Lado	(Denmark) Hjalte Johansen (Denmark) Emma Irring Braüner
23 January	Iceland International: Host: Reykjavík, Iceland; Venue: Tennis- og Badmintonfélag Reykjavíkur; Level: Future Series; Format: 32MS/32WS/32MD/32WD/32XD	Score: 13–21, 21–12, 23–21	
30 January	Thailand Masters (Draw): Host: Bangkok, Thailand; Venue: Nimibutr Stadium; Level: Super 300; Prize: $210,000; Format: 32MS/32WS/32MD/32WD/32XD	(Chinese Taipei) Lin Chun-yi	(Hong Kong) Ng Ka Long
30 January	Thailand Masters (Draw): Host: Bangkok, Thailand; Venue: Nimibutr Stadium; Level: Super 300; Prize: $210,000; Format: 32MS/32WS/32MD/32WD/32XD	Score: 21–17, 21–14	
30 January	Thailand Masters (Draw): Host: Bangkok, Thailand; Venue: Nimibutr Stadium; Level: Super 300; Prize: $210,000; Format: 32MS/32WS/32MD/32WD/32XD	(China) Zhang Yiman	(China) Han Yue
30 January	Thailand Masters (Draw): Host: Bangkok, Thailand; Venue: Nimibutr Stadium; Level: Super 300; Prize: $210,000; Format: 32MS/32WS/32MD/32WD/32XD	Score: 15–21, 21–13, 21–18	
30 January	Thailand Masters (Draw): Host: Bangkok, Thailand; Venue: Nimibutr Stadium; Level: Super 300; Prize: $210,000; Format: 32MS/32WS/32MD/32WD/32XD	(Indonesia) Leo Rolly Carnando (Indonesia) Daniel Marthin	(Chinese Taipei) Su Ching-heng (Chinese Taipei) Ye Hong-wei
30 January	Thailand Masters (Draw): Host: Bangkok, Thailand; Venue: Nimibutr Stadium; Level: Super 300; Prize: $210,000; Format: 32MS/32WS/32MD/32WD/32XD	Score: 21–16, 21–17	
30 January	Thailand Masters (Draw): Host: Bangkok, Thailand; Venue: Nimibutr Stadium; Level: Super 300; Prize: $210,000; Format: 32MS/32WS/32MD/32WD/32XD	(Thailand) Benyapa Aimsaard (Thailand) Nuntakarn Aimsaard	(South Korea) Baek Ha-na (South Korea) Lee So-hee
30 January	Thailand Masters (Draw): Host: Bangkok, Thailand; Venue: Nimibutr Stadium; Level: Super 300; Prize: $210,000; Format: 32MS/32WS/32MD/32WD/32XD	Score: 21–6, 21–11	
30 January	Thailand Masters (Draw): Host: Bangkok, Thailand; Venue: Nimibutr Stadium; Level: Super 300; Prize: $210,000; Format: 32MS/32WS/32MD/32WD/32XD	(China) Feng Yanzhe (China) Huang Dongping	(South Korea) Seo Seung-jae (South Korea) Chae Yoo-jung
30 January	Thailand Masters (Draw): Host: Bangkok, Thailand; Venue: Nimibutr Stadium; Level: Super 300; Prize: $210,000; Format: 32MS/32WS/32MD/32WD/32XD	Score: 18–21, 21–15, 21–12	
30 January	Iran Fajr International: Host: Tehran, Iran; Venue: Iran Badminton Federation Sports Hall; Level: International Challenge; Prize: $15,000; Format: 64MS/64WS/32MD/32WD/16XD	(Indonesia) Syabda Perkasa Belawa	(Malaysia) Justin Hoh
30 January	Iran Fajr International: Host: Tehran, Iran; Venue: Iran Badminton Federation Sports Hall; Level: International Challenge; Prize: $15,000; Format: 64MS/64WS/32MD/32WD/16XD	Score: 18–21, 21–12, 22–20	
30 January	Iran Fajr International: Host: Tehran, Iran; Venue: Iran Badminton Federation Sports Hall; Level: International Challenge; Prize: $15,000; Format: 64MS/64WS/32MD/32WD/16XD	(India) Tanya Hemanth	(India) Tasnim Mir
30 January	Iran Fajr International: Host: Tehran, Iran; Venue: Iran Badminton Federation Sports Hall; Level: International Challenge; Prize: $15,000; Format: 64MS/64WS/32MD/32WD/16XD	Score: 21–7, 21–11	
30 January	Iran Fajr International: Host: Tehran, Iran; Venue: Iran Badminton Federation Sports Hall; Level: International Challenge; Prize: $15,000; Format: 64MS/64WS/32MD/32WD/16XD	(Philippines) Christian Bernardo (Philippines) Alvin Morada	(Indonesia) Raymond Indra (Indonesia) Daniel Edgar Marvino
30 January	Iran Fajr International: Host: Tehran, Iran; Venue: Iran Badminton Federation Sports Hall; Level: International Challenge; Prize: $15,000; Format: 64MS/64WS/32MD/32WD/16XD	Score: 21–16, 21–17	
30 January	Iran Fajr International: Host: Tehran, Iran; Venue: Iran Badminton Federation Sports Hall; Level: International Challenge; Prize: $15,000; Format: 64MS/64WS/32MD/32WD/16XD	(Indonesia) Jesita Putri Miantoro (Indonesia) Febi Setianingrum	(Malaysia) Go Pei Kee (Malaysia) Teoh Mei Xing
30 January	Iran Fajr International: Host: Tehran, Iran; Venue: Iran Badminton Federation Sports Hall; Level: International Challenge; Prize: $15,000; Format: 64MS/64WS/32MD/32WD/16XD	Score: 20–22, 21–16, 21–17	
30 January	Iran Fajr International: Host: Tehran, Iran; Venue: Iran Badminton Federation Sports Hall; Level: International Challenge; Prize: $15,000; Format: 64MS/64WS/32MD/32WD/16XD	(Malaysia) Chen Tang Jie (Malaysia) Toh Ee Wei	(Malaysia) Hoo Pang Ron (Malaysia) Teoh Mei Xing
30 January	Iran Fajr International: Host: Tehran, Iran; Venue: Iran Badminton Federation Sports Hall; Level: International Challenge; Prize: $15,000; Format: 64MS/64WS/32MD/32WD/16XD	Score: 21–19, 21–15	

=== February ===
Week commencing	Tournament	Champions	Runners-up
13 February	Badminton Asia Mixed Team Championships (Draw): Host: Dubai, United Arab Emirates; Venue: Dubai Exhibition Centre; Level: Continental Team Championships; Format: 17 teams	China	South Korea
13 February	Badminton Asia Mixed Team Championships (Draw): Host: Dubai, United Arab Emirates; Venue: Dubai Exhibition Centre; Level: Continental Team Championships; Format: 17 teams	Lei Lanxi	Lee Yun-gyu
13 February	Badminton Asia Mixed Team Championships (Draw): Host: Dubai, United Arab Emirates; Venue: Dubai Exhibition Centre; Level: Continental Team Championships; Format: 17 teams	Gao Fangjie	Kim Ga-eun
13 February	Badminton Asia Mixed Team Championships (Draw): Host: Dubai, United Arab Emirates; Venue: Dubai Exhibition Centre; Level: Continental Team Championships; Format: 17 teams	He Jiting; Zhou Haodong	Kim Won-ho; Na Sung-seung
13 February	Badminton Asia Mixed Team Championships (Draw): Host: Dubai, United Arab Emirates; Venue: Dubai Exhibition Centre; Level: Continental Team Championships; Format: 17 teams	Liu Shengshu; Tan Ning	Jeong Na-eun; Lee So-hee
13 February	Badminton Asia Mixed Team Championships (Draw): Host: Dubai, United Arab Emirates; Venue: Dubai Exhibition Centre; Level: Continental Team Championships; Format: 17 teams	Feng Yanzhe; Huang Dongping	Kim Young-hyuk; Lee Yu-lim
13 February	Badminton Asia Mixed Team Championships (Draw): Host: Dubai, United Arab Emirates; Venue: Dubai Exhibition Centre; Level: Continental Team Championships; Format: 17 teams	Score: 3–1	
13 February	European Mixed Team Badminton Championships (Draw): Host: Aire-sur-la-Lys, France; Venue: Complexe Sportif Regional; Level: Continental Team Championships; Format: 8 teams	Denmark	France
13 February	European Mixed Team Badminton Championships (Draw): Host: Aire-sur-la-Lys, France; Venue: Complexe Sportif Regional; Level: Continental Team Championships; Format: 8 teams	Mathias Christiansen; Amalie Magelund	Thom Gicquel; Delphine Delrue
13 February	European Mixed Team Badminton Championships (Draw): Host: Aire-sur-la-Lys, France; Venue: Complexe Sportif Regional; Level: Continental Team Championships; Format: 8 teams	Viktor Axelsen	Christo Popov
13 February	European Mixed Team Badminton Championships (Draw): Host: Aire-sur-la-Lys, France; Venue: Complexe Sportif Regional; Level: Continental Team Championships; Format: 8 teams	Line Christophersen	Qi Xuefei
13 February	European Mixed Team Badminton Championships (Draw): Host: Aire-sur-la-Lys, France; Venue: Complexe Sportif Regional; Level: Continental Team Championships; Format: 8 teams	Kim Astrup; Frederik Søgaard	Thom Gicquel; Toma Junior Popov
13 February	European Mixed Team Badminton Championships (Draw): Host: Aire-sur-la-Lys, France; Venue: Complexe Sportif Regional; Level: Continental Team Championships; Format: 8 teams	Maiken Fruergaard; Sara Thygesen	Delphine Delrue; Margot Lambert
13 February	European Mixed Team Badminton Championships (Draw): Host: Aire-sur-la-Lys, France; Venue: Complexe Sportif Regional; Level: Continental Team Championships; Format: 8 teams	Score: 3–2	
13 February	Pan American Cup (Draw): Host: Guadalajara, Mexico; Venue: CODE Guadalajara; Level: Continental Team Championships; Format: 9 teams	Canada	United States
13 February	Pan American Cup (Draw): Host: Guadalajara, Mexico; Venue: CODE Guadalajara; Level: Continental Team Championships; Format: 9 teams	Ty Alexander Lindeman; Josephine Wu	Vinson Chiu; Jennie Gai
13 February	Pan American Cup (Draw): Host: Guadalajara, Mexico; Venue: CODE Guadalajara; Level: Continental Team Championships; Format: 9 teams	Brian Yang	Isaac Yang
13 February	Pan American Cup (Draw): Host: Guadalajara, Mexico; Venue: CODE Guadalajara; Level: Continental Team Championships; Format: 9 teams	Adam Dong; Nyl Yakura	Vinson Chiu; Joshua Yuan
13 February	Pan American Cup (Draw): Host: Guadalajara, Mexico; Venue: CODE Guadalajara; Level: Continental Team Championships; Format: 9 teams	Michelle Li	Beiwen Zhang
13 February	Pan American Cup (Draw): Host: Guadalajara, Mexico; Venue: CODE Guadalajara; Level: Continental Team Championships; Format: 9 teams	Rachel Honderich; Josephine Wu	Annie Xu; Kerry Xu
13 February	Pan American Cup (Draw): Host: Guadalajara, Mexico; Venue: CODE Guadalajara; Level: Continental Team Championships; Format: 9 teams	Score: 3–0	
13 February	Oceania Badminton Championships (Draw): Host: Auckland, New Zealand; Venue: Auckland Badminton Stadium; Level: Continental Individual Championships (International Challenge); Format: 64MS/32WS/32MD/32WD/32XD	(New Zealand) Abhinav Manota	(New Zealand) Edward Lau
13 February	Oceania Badminton Championships (Draw): Host: Auckland, New Zealand; Venue: Auckland Badminton Stadium; Level: Continental Individual Championships (International Challenge); Format: 64MS/32WS/32MD/32WD/32XD	Score: 21–12, 21–16	
13 February	Oceania Badminton Championships (Draw): Host: Auckland, New Zealand; Venue: Auckland Badminton Stadium; Level: Continental Individual Championships (International Challenge); Format: 64MS/32WS/32MD/32WD/32XD	(New Zealand) Shaunna Li	(Australia) Tiffany Ho
13 February	Oceania Badminton Championships (Draw): Host: Auckland, New Zealand; Venue: Auckland Badminton Stadium; Level: Continental Individual Championships (International Challenge); Format: 64MS/32WS/32MD/32WD/32XD	Score: 24–22, 18–21, 21–12	
13 February	Oceania Badminton Championships (Draw): Host: Auckland, New Zealand; Venue: Auckland Badminton Stadium; Level: Continental Individual Championships (International Challenge); Format: 64MS/32WS/32MD/32WD/32XD	(Australia) Kenneth Choo (Australia) Rayne Wang	(New Zealand) Alan Chan (New Zealand) Chance Cheng
13 February	Oceania Badminton Championships (Draw): Host: Auckland, New Zealand; Venue: Auckland Badminton Stadium; Level: Continental Individual Championships (International Challenge); Format: 64MS/32WS/32MD/32WD/32XD	Score: 17–21, 21–15, 21–18	
13 February	Oceania Badminton Championships (Draw): Host: Auckland, New Zealand; Venue: Auckland Badminton Stadium; Level: Continental Individual Championships (International Challenge); Format: 64MS/32WS/32MD/32WD/32XD	(Australia) Sylvina Kurniawan (Australia) Setyana Mapasa	(Australia) Tiffany Ho (Australia) Khoo Lee Yen
13 February	Oceania Badminton Championships (Draw): Host: Auckland, New Zealand; Venue: Auckland Badminton Stadium; Level: Continental Individual Championships (International Challenge); Format: 64MS/32WS/32MD/32WD/32XD	Score: 21–7, 21–9	
13 February	Oceania Badminton Championships (Draw): Host: Auckland, New Zealand; Venue: Auckland Badminton Stadium; Level: Continental Individual Championships (International Challenge); Format: 64MS/32WS/32MD/32WD/32XD	(Australia) Kenneth Choo (Australia) Gronya Somerville	(Australia) Lim Ming Chuen (Australia) Sylvina Kurniawan
13 February	Oceania Badminton Championships (Draw): Host: Auckland, New Zealand; Venue: Auckland Badminton Stadium; Level: Continental Individual Championships (International Challenge); Format: 64MS/32WS/32MD/32WD/32XD	Score: 21–12, 21–16	
13 February	Oceania Mixed Team Badminton Championships (Draw): Host: Auckland, New Zealand; Venue: Auckland Badminton Stadium; Level: Continental Team Championships; Format: 7 teams (Round robin)	Australia	New Zealand
13 February	Oceania Mixed Team Badminton Championships (Draw): Host: Auckland, New Zealand; Venue: Auckland Badminton Stadium; Level: Continental Team Championships; Format: 7 teams (Round robin)	Gronya Somerville; Jack Yu; Jacob Schueler; Joyce Choong; Kaitlyn Ea; Kenneth Choo; Lim Ming Chuen; Louisa Ma; Nathan Tang; Tiffany Ho	Abhinav Manota; Adam Jeffrey; Anona Pak; Camellia Zhou; Dylan Soedjasa; Edward Lau; Erena Calder-Hawkins; Jack Wang; Justine Villegas; Shaunna Li
13 February	Oceania Mixed Team Badminton Championships (Draw): Host: Auckland, New Zealand; Venue: Auckland Badminton Stadium; Level: Continental Team Championships; Format: 7 teams (Round robin)	Score: Round robin	
13 February	All Africa Mixed Team Badminton Championships (Draw): Host: Benoni, Gauteng, South Africa; Venue: John Barrable Hall; Level: Continental Team Championships; Format: 13 teams	Egypt	Mauritius
13 February	All Africa Mixed Team Badminton Championships (Draw): Host: Benoni, Gauteng, South Africa; Venue: John Barrable Hall; Level: Continental Team Championships; Format: 13 teams	Adham Hatem Elgamal; Doha Hany	Jean Bernard Bongout; Kobita Dookhee
13 February	All Africa Mixed Team Badminton Championships (Draw): Host: Benoni, Gauteng, South Africa; Venue: John Barrable Hall; Level: Continental Team Championships; Format: 13 teams	Ahmed Salah	Julien Paul
13 February	All Africa Mixed Team Badminton Championships (Draw): Host: Benoni, Gauteng, South Africa; Venue: John Barrable Hall; Level: Continental Team Championships; Format: 13 teams	Nour Ahmed Youssri	Kate Ludík
13 February	All Africa Mixed Team Badminton Championships (Draw): Host: Benoni, Gauteng, South Africa; Venue: John Barrable Hall; Level: Continental Team Championships; Format: 13 teams	Adham Hatem Elgamal; Ahmed Salah	Jean Bernard Bongout; Julien Paul
13 February	All Africa Mixed Team Badminton Championships (Draw): Host: Benoni, Gauteng, South Africa; Venue: John Barrable Hall; Level: Continental Team Championships; Format: 13 teams	Nour Ahmed Youssri; Doha Hany	Kobita Dookhee; Kate Ludík
13 February	All Africa Mixed Team Badminton Championships (Draw): Host: Benoni, Gauteng, South Africa; Venue: John Barrable Hall; Level: Continental Team Championships; Format: 13 teams	Score: 3–2	
13 February	All Africa Individual Championships (Draw): Host: Benoni, Gauteng, South Africa; Venue: John Barrable Hall; Level: Continental Individual Championships; Format: 64MS/64WS/32MD/16WD/32XD	(Nigeria) Anuoluwapo Juwon Opeyori	(Mauritius) Julien Paul
13 February	All Africa Individual Championships (Draw): Host: Benoni, Gauteng, South Africa; Venue: John Barrable Hall; Level: Continental Individual Championships; Format: 64MS/64WS/32MD/16WD/32XD	Score: 18–21, 21–13, 21–18	
13 February	All Africa Individual Championships (Draw): Host: Benoni, Gauteng, South Africa; Venue: John Barrable Hall; Level: Continental Individual Championships; Format: 64MS/64WS/32MD/16WD/32XD	(Uganda) Fadilah Mohamed Rafi	(South Africa) Johanita Scholtz
13 February	All Africa Individual Championships (Draw): Host: Benoni, Gauteng, South Africa; Venue: John Barrable Hall; Level: Continental Individual Championships; Format: 64MS/64WS/32MD/16WD/32XD	Score: 14–21, 21–14, 21–16	
13 February	All Africa Individual Championships (Draw): Host: Benoni, Gauteng, South Africa; Venue: John Barrable Hall; Level: Continental Individual Championships; Format: 64MS/64WS/32MD/16WD/32XD	(South Africa) Jarred Elliott (South Africa) Robert Summers	(Algeria) Mohamed Abderrahime Belarbi (Algeria) Adel Hamek
13 February	All Africa Individual Championships (Draw): Host: Benoni, Gauteng, South Africa; Venue: John Barrable Hall; Level: Continental Individual Championships; Format: 64MS/64WS/32MD/16WD/32XD	Score: 21–13, 21–17	
13 February	All Africa Individual Championships (Draw): Host: Benoni, Gauteng, South Africa; Venue: John Barrable Hall; Level: Continental Individual Championships; Format: 64MS/64WS/32MD/16WD/32XD	(South Africa) Amy Ackerman (South Africa) Deidre Laurens	(Algeria) Yasmina Chibah (Algeria) Linda Mazri
13 February	All Africa Individual Championships (Draw): Host: Benoni, Gauteng, South Africa; Venue: John Barrable Hall; Level: Continental Individual Championships; Format: 64MS/64WS/32MD/16WD/32XD	Score: 21–19, 21–12	
13 February	All Africa Individual Championships (Draw): Host: Benoni, Gauteng, South Africa; Venue: John Barrable Hall; Level: Continental Individual Championships; Format: 64MS/64WS/32MD/16WD/32XD	(Algeria) Koceila Mammeri (Algeria) Tanina Mammeri	(Egypt) Adham Hatem Elgamal (Egypt) Doha Hany
13 February	All Africa Individual Championships (Draw): Host: Benoni, Gauteng, South Africa; Venue: John Barrable Hall; Level: Continental Individual Championships; Format: 64MS/64WS/32MD/16WD/32XD	Score: 21–15, 21–13	
20 February	Uganda International: Host: Kampala, Uganda; Venue: MTN Arena; Level: International Challenge; Prize: $25,000; Format: 32MS/32WS/32MD/32WD/32XD	(Malaysia) Justin Hoh	(India) Kanishq M.
20 February	Uganda International: Host: Kampala, Uganda; Venue: MTN Arena; Level: International Challenge; Prize: $25,000; Format: 32MS/32WS/32MD/32WD/32XD	Score: 21–8, 21–12	
20 February	Uganda International: Host: Kampala, Uganda; Venue: MTN Arena; Level: International Challenge; Prize: $25,000; Format: 32MS/32WS/32MD/32WD/32XD	(Malaysia) Letshanaa Karupathevan	(Turkey) Neslihan Yiğit
20 February	Uganda International: Host: Kampala, Uganda; Venue: MTN Arena; Level: International Challenge; Prize: $25,000; Format: 32MS/32WS/32MD/32WD/32XD	Score: 21–11, 21–8	
20 February	Uganda International: Host: Kampala, Uganda; Venue: MTN Arena; Level: International Challenge; Prize: $25,000; Format: 32MS/32WS/32MD/32WD/32XD	(Thailand) Pongsakorn Thongkham (Thailand) Wongsathorn Thongkham	(Azerbaijan) Ade Resky Dwicahyo (Azerbaijan) Azmy Qowimuramadhoni
20 February	Uganda International: Host: Kampala, Uganda; Venue: MTN Arena; Level: International Challenge; Prize: $25,000; Format: 32MS/32WS/32MD/32WD/32XD	Score: 21–19, 21–18	
20 February	Uganda International: Host: Kampala, Uganda; Venue: MTN Arena; Level: International Challenge; Prize: $25,000; Format: 32MS/32WS/32MD/32WD/32XD	(India) Trisha Hegde (India) Khushi Thakkar	(Italy) Martina Corsini (Italy) Judith Mair
20 February	Uganda International: Host: Kampala, Uganda; Venue: MTN Arena; Level: International Challenge; Prize: $25,000; Format: 32MS/32WS/32MD/32WD/32XD	Score: 17–21, 23–21, 21–13	
20 February	Uganda International: Host: Kampala, Uganda; Venue: MTN Arena; Level: International Challenge; Prize: $25,000; Format: 32MS/32WS/32MD/32WD/32XD	(Singapore) Andy Kwek (Singapore) Crystal Wong	(Austria) Philipp Drexler (Austria) Serena Au Yeong
20 February	Uganda International: Host: Kampala, Uganda; Venue: MTN Arena; Level: International Challenge; Prize: $25,000; Format: 32MS/32WS/32MD/32WD/32XD	Score: 21–17, 21–19	

=== March ===
Week commencing	Tournament	Champions	Runners-up
6 March	German Open (Draw): Host: Mülheim, Germany; Venue: Westenergie Sporthalle; Level: Super 300; Prize: $210,000; Format: 32MS/32WS/32MD/32WD/32XD	(Hong Kong) Ng Ka Long	(China) Li Shifeng
6 March	German Open (Draw): Host: Mülheim, Germany; Venue: Westenergie Sporthalle; Level: Super 300; Prize: $210,000; Format: 32MS/32WS/32MD/32WD/32XD	Score: 20–22, 21–18, 21–18	
6 March	German Open (Draw): Host: Mülheim, Germany; Venue: Westenergie Sporthalle; Level: Super 300; Prize: $210,000; Format: 32MS/32WS/32MD/32WD/32XD	(Japan) Akane Yamaguchi	(South Korea) An Se-young
6 March	German Open (Draw): Host: Mülheim, Germany; Venue: Westenergie Sporthalle; Level: Super 300; Prize: $210,000; Format: 32MS/32WS/32MD/32WD/32XD	Score: 21–11, 21–14	
6 March	German Open (Draw): Host: Mülheim, Germany; Venue: Westenergie Sporthalle; Level: Super 300; Prize: $210,000; Format: 32MS/32WS/32MD/32WD/32XD	(South Korea) Choi Sol-gyu (South Korea) Kim Won-ho	(South Korea) Kang Min-hyuk (South Korea) Seo Seung-jae
6 March	German Open (Draw): Host: Mülheim, Germany; Venue: Westenergie Sporthalle; Level: Super 300; Prize: $210,000; Format: 32MS/32WS/32MD/32WD/32XD	Score: 21–19, 18–21, 21–19	
6 March	German Open (Draw): Host: Mülheim, Germany; Venue: Westenergie Sporthalle; Level: Super 300; Prize: $210,000; Format: 32MS/32WS/32MD/32WD/32XD	(South Korea) Baek Ha-na (South Korea) Lee So-hee	(Japan) Nami Matsuyama (Japan) Chiharu Shida
6 March	German Open (Draw): Host: Mülheim, Germany; Venue: Westenergie Sporthalle; Level: Super 300; Prize: $210,000; Format: 32MS/32WS/32MD/32WD/32XD	Score: 21–19, 21–15	
6 March	German Open (Draw): Host: Mülheim, Germany; Venue: Westenergie Sporthalle; Level: Super 300; Prize: $210,000; Format: 32MS/32WS/32MD/32WD/32XD	(China) Feng Yanzhe (China) Huang Dongping	(South Korea) Kim Won-ho (South Korea) Jeong Na-eun
6 March	German Open (Draw): Host: Mülheim, Germany; Venue: Westenergie Sporthalle; Level: Super 300; Prize: $210,000; Format: 32MS/32WS/32MD/32WD/32XD	Score: 21–4, 21–15	
6 March	Thailand International: Host: Bangkok, Thailand; Venue: Indoor Stadium Huamark; Level: International Challenge; Prize: $25,000; Format: 32MS/32WS/32MD/32WD/32XD	(Japan) Minoru Koga	(Chinese Taipei) Chi Yu-jen
6 March	Thailand International: Host: Bangkok, Thailand; Venue: Indoor Stadium Huamark; Level: International Challenge; Prize: $25,000; Format: 32MS/32WS/32MD/32WD/32XD	Score: 15–21, 21–17, 22–20	
6 March	Thailand International: Host: Bangkok, Thailand; Venue: Indoor Stadium Huamark; Level: International Challenge; Prize: $25,000; Format: 32MS/32WS/32MD/32WD/32XD	(Japan) Asuka Takahashi	(Vietnam) Nguyễn Thùy Linh
6 March	Thailand International: Host: Bangkok, Thailand; Venue: Indoor Stadium Huamark; Level: International Challenge; Prize: $25,000; Format: 32MS/32WS/32MD/32WD/32XD	Score: 21–17, 21–17	
6 March	Thailand International: Host: Bangkok, Thailand; Venue: Indoor Stadium Huamark; Level: International Challenge; Prize: $25,000; Format: 32MS/32WS/32MD/32WD/32XD	(Thailand) Chaloempon Charoenkitamorn (Thailand) Nanthakarn Yordphaisong	(Malaysia) Choong Hon Jian (Malaysia) Goh Sze Fei
6 March	Thailand International: Host: Bangkok, Thailand; Venue: Indoor Stadium Huamark; Level: International Challenge; Prize: $25,000; Format: 32MS/32WS/32MD/32WD/32XD	Score: 15–21, 21–15, 24–22	
6 March	Thailand International: Host: Bangkok, Thailand; Venue: Indoor Stadium Huamark; Level: International Challenge; Prize: $25,000; Format: 32MS/32WS/32MD/32WD/32XD	(Chinese Taipei) Liu Chiao-yun (Chinese Taipei) Wang Yu-qiao	(Hong Kong) Lui Lok Lok (Hong Kong) Ng Wing Yung
6 March	Thailand International: Host: Bangkok, Thailand; Venue: Indoor Stadium Huamark; Level: International Challenge; Prize: $25,000; Format: 32MS/32WS/32MD/32WD/32XD	Score: 21–9, 21–15	
6 March	Thailand International: Host: Bangkok, Thailand; Venue: Indoor Stadium Huamark; Level: International Challenge; Prize: $25,000; Format: 32MS/32WS/32MD/32WD/32XD	(Thailand) Ruttanapak Oupthong (Thailand) Jhenicha Sudjaipraparat	(Indonesia) Adnan Maulana (Indonesia) Nita Violina Marwah
6 March	Thailand International: Host: Bangkok, Thailand; Venue: Indoor Stadium Huamark; Level: International Challenge; Prize: $25,000; Format: 32MS/32WS/32MD/32WD/32XD	Score: 21–13, 21–19	
6 March	Portugal International: Host: Caldas da Rainha, Portugal; Venue: Badminton High Performance Sports Centre; Level: International Series; Prize: $10,000; Format: 32MS/32WS/32MD/32WD/32XD	(England) Johnnie Torjussen	(Denmark) Victor Ørding Kauffmann
6 March	Portugal International: Host: Caldas da Rainha, Portugal; Venue: Badminton High Performance Sports Centre; Level: International Series; Prize: $10,000; Format: 32MS/32WS/32MD/32WD/32XD	Score: 21–13, 16–21, 21–18	
6 March	Portugal International: Host: Caldas da Rainha, Portugal; Venue: Badminton High Performance Sports Centre; Level: International Series; Prize: $10,000; Format: 32MS/32WS/32MD/32WD/32XD	(Turkey) Neslihan Yiğit	(Turkey) Özge Bayrak
6 March	Portugal International: Host: Caldas da Rainha, Portugal; Venue: Badminton High Performance Sports Centre; Level: International Series; Prize: $10,000; Format: 32MS/32WS/32MD/32WD/32XD	Score: 21–14, 21–12	
6 March	Portugal International: Host: Caldas da Rainha, Portugal; Venue: Badminton High Performance Sports Centre; Level: International Series; Prize: $10,000; Format: 32MS/32WS/32MD/32WD/32XD	(France) Julien Maio (France) William Villeger	(Japan) Kazuhiro Ichikawa (Japan) Daiki Umayahara
6 March	Portugal International: Host: Caldas da Rainha, Portugal; Venue: Badminton High Performance Sports Centre; Level: International Series; Prize: $10,000; Format: 32MS/32WS/32MD/32WD/32XD	Score: 16–21, 21–15, 21–13	
6 March	Portugal International: Host: Caldas da Rainha, Portugal; Venue: Badminton High Performance Sports Centre; Level: International Series; Prize: $10,000; Format: 32MS/32WS/32MD/32WD/32XD	(Turkey) Bengisu Erçetin (Turkey) Nazlıcan İnci	(Denmark) Christine Busch (Denmark) Amalie Schulz
6 March	Portugal International: Host: Caldas da Rainha, Portugal; Venue: Badminton High Performance Sports Centre; Level: International Series; Prize: $10,000; Format: 32MS/32WS/32MD/32WD/32XD	Score: 21–9, 21–17	
6 March	Portugal International: Host: Caldas da Rainha, Portugal; Venue: Badminton High Performance Sports Centre; Level: International Series; Prize: $10,000; Format: 32MS/32WS/32MD/32WD/32XD	(Denmark) Andreas Søndergaard (Denmark) Iben Bergstein	(Canada) Joshua Hurlburt-Yu (Canada) Rachel Honderich
6 March	Portugal International: Host: Caldas da Rainha, Portugal; Venue: Badminton High Performance Sports Centre; Level: International Series; Prize: $10,000; Format: 32MS/32WS/32MD/32WD/32XD	Score: 21–19, 22–20	
13 March	All England Open (Draw): Host: Birmingham, England; Venue: Utilita Arena Birmingham; Level: Super 1000; Prize: $1,250,000; Format: 32MS/32WS/32MD/32WD/32XD	(China) Li Shifeng	(China) Shi Yuqi
13 March	All England Open (Draw): Host: Birmingham, England; Venue: Utilita Arena Birmingham; Level: Super 1000; Prize: $1,250,000; Format: 32MS/32WS/32MD/32WD/32XD	Score: 26–24, 21–5	
13 March	All England Open (Draw): Host: Birmingham, England; Venue: Utilita Arena Birmingham; Level: Super 1000; Prize: $1,250,000; Format: 32MS/32WS/32MD/32WD/32XD	(South Korea) An Se-young	(China) Chen Yufei
13 March	All England Open (Draw): Host: Birmingham, England; Venue: Utilita Arena Birmingham; Level: Super 1000; Prize: $1,250,000; Format: 32MS/32WS/32MD/32WD/32XD	Score: 21–17, 10–21, 21–19	
13 March	All England Open (Draw): Host: Birmingham, England; Venue: Utilita Arena Birmingham; Level: Super 1000; Prize: $1,250,000; Format: 32MS/32WS/32MD/32WD/32XD	(Indonesia) Fajar Alfian (Indonesia) Muhammad Rian Ardianto	(Indonesia) Mohammad Ahsan (Indonesia) Hendra Setiawan
13 March	All England Open (Draw): Host: Birmingham, England; Venue: Utilita Arena Birmingham; Level: Super 1000; Prize: $1,250,000; Format: 32MS/32WS/32MD/32WD/32XD	Score: 21–17, 21–14	
13 March	All England Open (Draw): Host: Birmingham, England; Venue: Utilita Arena Birmingham; Level: Super 1000; Prize: $1,250,000; Format: 32MS/32WS/32MD/32WD/32XD	(South Korea) Kim So-yeong (South Korea) Kong Hee-yong	(South Korea) Baek Ha-na (South Korea) Lee So-hee
13 March	All England Open (Draw): Host: Birmingham, England; Venue: Utilita Arena Birmingham; Level: Super 1000; Prize: $1,250,000; Format: 32MS/32WS/32MD/32WD/32XD	Score: 21–5, 21–12	
13 March	All England Open (Draw): Host: Birmingham, England; Venue: Utilita Arena Birmingham; Level: Super 1000; Prize: $1,250,000; Format: 32MS/32WS/32MD/32WD/32XD	(China) Zheng Siwei (China) Huang Yaqiong	(South Korea) Seo Seung-jae (South Korea) Chae Yoo-jung
13 March	All England Open (Draw): Host: Birmingham, England; Venue: Utilita Arena Birmingham; Level: Super 1000; Prize: $1,250,000; Format: 32MS/32WS/32MD/32WD/32XD	Score: 21–16, 16–21, 21–12	
13 March	Ruichang China Masters (Draw): Host: Ruichang, China; Venue: Ruichang Sports Park Gym; Level: Super 100; Prize: $120,000; Format: 48MS/32WS/32MD/32WD/32XD	(China) Sun Feixiang	(China) Sun Chao
13 March	Ruichang China Masters (Draw): Host: Ruichang, China; Venue: Ruichang Sports Park Gym; Level: Super 100; Prize: $120,000; Format: 48MS/32WS/32MD/32WD/32XD	Score: 21–15, 21–14	
13 March	Ruichang China Masters (Draw): Host: Ruichang, China; Venue: Ruichang Sports Park Gym; Level: Super 100; Prize: $120,000; Format: 48MS/32WS/32MD/32WD/32XD	(Chinese Taipei) Lin Hsiang-ti	(China) Chen Lu
13 March	Ruichang China Masters (Draw): Host: Ruichang, China; Venue: Ruichang Sports Park Gym; Level: Super 100; Prize: $120,000; Format: 48MS/32WS/32MD/32WD/32XD	Score: 13–21, 21–11, 22–20	
13 March	Ruichang China Masters (Draw): Host: Ruichang, China; Venue: Ruichang Sports Park Gym; Level: Super 100; Prize: $120,000; Format: 48MS/32WS/32MD/32WD/32XD	(China) Chen Boyang (China) Liu Yi	(Malaysia) Nur Izzuddin (Malaysia) Muhammad Haikal
13 March	Ruichang China Masters (Draw): Host: Ruichang, China; Venue: Ruichang Sports Park Gym; Level: Super 100; Prize: $120,000; Format: 48MS/32WS/32MD/32WD/32XD	Score: 21–16, 19–21, 23–21	
13 March	Ruichang China Masters (Draw): Host: Ruichang, China; Venue: Ruichang Sports Park Gym; Level: Super 100; Prize: $120,000; Format: 48MS/32WS/32MD/32WD/32XD	(China) Chen Xiaofei (China) Feng Xueying	(China) Keng Shuliang (China) Zhang Chi
13 March	Ruichang China Masters (Draw): Host: Ruichang, China; Venue: Ruichang Sports Park Gym; Level: Super 100; Prize: $120,000; Format: 48MS/32WS/32MD/32WD/32XD	Score: 21–15, 21–19	
13 March	Ruichang China Masters (Draw): Host: Ruichang, China; Venue: Ruichang Sports Park Gym; Level: Super 100; Prize: $120,000; Format: 48MS/32WS/32MD/32WD/32XD	(China) Jiang Zhenbang (China) Wei Yaxin	(China) Cheng Xing (China) Chen Fanghui
13 March	Ruichang China Masters (Draw): Host: Ruichang, China; Venue: Ruichang Sports Park Gym; Level: Super 100; Prize: $120,000; Format: 48MS/32WS/32MD/32WD/32XD	Score: 21–15, 21–8	
13 March	Giraldilla International: Host: Havana, Cuba; Venue: Coliseo de la Ciudad Deportiva; Level: Future Series; Format: 32MS/32WS/16MD/8WD/16XD	(Indonesia) Muhammad Halim As Sidiq	(Indonesia) Muhammad Sultan
13 March	Giraldilla International: Host: Havana, Cuba; Venue: Coliseo de la Ciudad Deportiva; Level: Future Series; Format: 32MS/32WS/16MD/8WD/16XD	Score: 21–15, 11–21, 21–17	
13 March	Giraldilla International: Host: Havana, Cuba; Venue: Coliseo de la Ciudad Deportiva; Level: Future Series; Format: 32MS/32WS/16MD/8WD/16XD	(Bulgaria) Hristomira Popovska	(Peru) Inés Castillo
13 March	Giraldilla International: Host: Havana, Cuba; Venue: Coliseo de la Ciudad Deportiva; Level: Future Series; Format: 32MS/32WS/16MD/8WD/16XD	Score: 21–16, 16–21, 22–20	
13 March	Giraldilla International: Host: Havana, Cuba; Venue: Coliseo de la Ciudad Deportiva; Level: Future Series; Format: 32MS/32WS/16MD/8WD/16XD	(England) Kelvin Ho (Jamaica) Samuel Ricketts	(Croatia) Aria Dinata (Croatia) Filip Špoljarec
13 March	Giraldilla International: Host: Havana, Cuba; Venue: Coliseo de la Ciudad Deportiva; Level: Future Series; Format: 32MS/32WS/16MD/8WD/16XD	Score: 21–18, 15–21, 21–16	
13 March	Giraldilla International: Host: Havana, Cuba; Venue: Coliseo de la Ciudad Deportiva; Level: Future Series; Format: 32MS/32WS/16MD/8WD/16XD	(Cuba) Taymara Oropesa (Cuba) Yeily Ortiz	(Guatemala) Alejandra Paiz (Guatemala) Mariana Paiz
13 March	Giraldilla International: Host: Havana, Cuba; Venue: Coliseo de la Ciudad Deportiva; Level: Future Series; Format: 32MS/32WS/16MD/8WD/16XD	Score: 4–1 retired	
13 March	Giraldilla International: Host: Havana, Cuba; Venue: Coliseo de la Ciudad Deportiva; Level: Future Series; Format: 32MS/32WS/16MD/8WD/16XD	(Bulgaria) Iliyan Stoynov (Bulgaria) Hristomira Popovska	(Guatemala) Christopher Martínez (Guatemala) Mariana Paiz
13 March	Giraldilla International: Host: Havana, Cuba; Venue: Coliseo de la Ciudad Deportiva; Level: Future Series; Format: 32MS/32WS/16MD/8WD/16XD	Score: 21–14, 21–19	
20 March	Swiss Open (Draw): Host: Basel, Switzerland; Venue: St. Jakobshalle; Level: Super 300; Prize: $210,000; Format: 32MS/32WS/32MD/32WD/32XD	(Japan) Koki Watanabe	(Chinese Taipei) Chou Tien-chen
20 March	Swiss Open (Draw): Host: Basel, Switzerland; Venue: St. Jakobshalle; Level: Super 300; Prize: $210,000; Format: 32MS/32WS/32MD/32WD/32XD	Score: 22–20, 18–21, 21–12	
20 March	Swiss Open (Draw): Host: Basel, Switzerland; Venue: St. Jakobshalle; Level: Super 300; Prize: $210,000; Format: 32MS/32WS/32MD/32WD/32XD	(Thailand) Pornpawee Chochuwong	(Denmark) Mia Blichfeldt
20 March	Swiss Open (Draw): Host: Basel, Switzerland; Venue: St. Jakobshalle; Level: Super 300; Prize: $210,000; Format: 32MS/32WS/32MD/32WD/32XD	Score: 21–16, 21–18	
20 March	Swiss Open (Draw): Host: Basel, Switzerland; Venue: St. Jakobshalle; Level: Super 300; Prize: $210,000; Format: 32MS/32WS/32MD/32WD/32XD	(India) Satwiksairaj Rankireddy (India) Chirag Shetty	(China) Ren Xiangyu (China) Tan Qiang
20 March	Swiss Open (Draw): Host: Basel, Switzerland; Venue: St. Jakobshalle; Level: Super 300; Prize: $210,000; Format: 32MS/32WS/32MD/32WD/32XD	Score: 21–19, 24–22	
20 March	Swiss Open (Draw): Host: Basel, Switzerland; Venue: St. Jakobshalle; Level: Super 300; Prize: $210,000; Format: 32MS/32WS/32MD/32WD/32XD	(Japan) Rena Miyaura (Japan) Ayako Sakuramoto	(Japan) Yuki Fukushima (Japan) Sayaka Hirota
20 March	Swiss Open (Draw): Host: Basel, Switzerland; Venue: St. Jakobshalle; Level: Super 300; Prize: $210,000; Format: 32MS/32WS/32MD/32WD/32XD	Score: Walkover	
20 March	Swiss Open (Draw): Host: Basel, Switzerland; Venue: St. Jakobshalle; Level: Super 300; Prize: $210,000; Format: 32MS/32WS/32MD/32WD/32XD	(China) Jiang Zhenbang (China) Wei Yaxin	(Malaysia) Goh Soon Huat (Malaysia) Shevon Jemie Lai
20 March	Swiss Open (Draw): Host: Basel, Switzerland; Venue: St. Jakobshalle; Level: Super 300; Prize: $210,000; Format: 32MS/32WS/32MD/32WD/32XD	Score: 21–17, 19–21, 21–17	
20 March	Polish Open: Host: Tarnów, Poland; Venue: Arena Jaskółka Tarnów; Level: International Challenge; Prize: $25,000; Format: 32MS/32WS/32MD/32WD/32XD	(France) Alex Lanier	(Finland) Kalle Koljonen
20 March	Polish Open: Host: Tarnów, Poland; Venue: Arena Jaskółka Tarnów; Level: International Challenge; Prize: $25,000; Format: 32MS/32WS/32MD/32WD/32XD	Score: 21–14, 21–15	
20 March	Polish Open: Host: Tarnów, Poland; Venue: Arena Jaskółka Tarnów; Level: International Challenge; Prize: $25,000; Format: 32MS/32WS/32MD/32WD/32XD	(Singapore) Yeo Jia Min	(Turkey) Neslihan Yiğit
20 March	Polish Open: Host: Tarnów, Poland; Venue: Arena Jaskółka Tarnów; Level: International Challenge; Prize: $25,000; Format: 32MS/32WS/32MD/32WD/32XD	Score: 21–13, 21–11	
20 March	Polish Open: Host: Tarnów, Poland; Venue: Arena Jaskółka Tarnów; Level: International Challenge; Prize: $25,000; Format: 32MS/32WS/32MD/32WD/32XD	(Denmark) Daniel Lundgaard (Denmark) Mads Vestergaard	(Chinese Taipei) Chang Ko-chi (Chinese Taipei) Po Li-wei
20 March	Polish Open: Host: Tarnów, Poland; Venue: Arena Jaskółka Tarnów; Level: International Challenge; Prize: $25,000; Format: 32MS/32WS/32MD/32WD/32XD	Score: 22–20, 16–21, 21–19	
20 March	Polish Open: Host: Tarnów, Poland; Venue: Arena Jaskółka Tarnów; Level: International Challenge; Prize: $25,000; Format: 32MS/32WS/32MD/32WD/32XD	(Singapore) Jin Yujia (Singapore) Crystal Wong	(Canada) Catherine Choi (Canada) Josephine Wu
20 March	Polish Open: Host: Tarnów, Poland; Venue: Arena Jaskółka Tarnów; Level: International Challenge; Prize: $25,000; Format: 32MS/32WS/32MD/32WD/32XD	Score: 21–17, 17–21, 21–15	
20 March	Polish Open: Host: Tarnów, Poland; Venue: Arena Jaskółka Tarnów; Level: International Challenge; Prize: $25,000; Format: 32MS/32WS/32MD/32WD/32XD	(Denmark) Mads Vestergaard (Denmark) Christine Busch	(Denmark) Jesper Toft (Denmark) Clara Graversen
20 March	Polish Open: Host: Tarnów, Poland; Venue: Arena Jaskółka Tarnów; Level: International Challenge; Prize: $25,000; Format: 32MS/32WS/32MD/32WD/32XD	Score: 21–15, 21–13	
20 March	Vietnam International: Host: Hanoi, Vietnam; Venue: Tay Ho District Stadium; Level: International Challenge; Prize: $15,000; Format: 64MS/32WS/32MD/32WD/32XD	(Japan) Takuma Obayashi	(Vietnam) Lê Đức Phát
20 March	Vietnam International: Host: Hanoi, Vietnam; Venue: Tay Ho District Stadium; Level: International Challenge; Prize: $15,000; Format: 64MS/32WS/32MD/32WD/32XD	Score: 21–14, 21–15	
20 March	Vietnam International: Host: Hanoi, Vietnam; Venue: Tay Ho District Stadium; Level: International Challenge; Prize: $15,000; Format: 64MS/32WS/32MD/32WD/32XD	(Vietnam) Nguyễn Thùy Linh	(Japan) Asuka Takahashi
20 March	Vietnam International: Host: Hanoi, Vietnam; Venue: Tay Ho District Stadium; Level: International Challenge; Prize: $15,000; Format: 64MS/32WS/32MD/32WD/32XD	Score: 21–7, 15–21, 21–12	
20 March	Vietnam International: Host: Hanoi, Vietnam; Venue: Tay Ho District Stadium; Level: International Challenge; Prize: $15,000; Format: 64MS/32WS/32MD/32WD/32XD	(South Korea) Jin Yong (South Korea) Na Sung-seung	(Indonesia) Alfian Eko Prasetya (Indonesia) Ade Yusuf Santoso
20 March	Vietnam International: Host: Hanoi, Vietnam; Venue: Tay Ho District Stadium; Level: International Challenge; Prize: $15,000; Format: 64MS/32WS/32MD/32WD/32XD	Score: 21–8, 21–6	
20 March	Vietnam International: Host: Hanoi, Vietnam; Venue: Tay Ho District Stadium; Level: International Challenge; Prize: $15,000; Format: 64MS/32WS/32MD/32WD/32XD	(South Korea) Lee Yu-lim (South Korea) Shin Seung-chan	(Indonesia) Jesita Putri Miantoro (Indonesia) Febi Setianingrum
20 March	Vietnam International: Host: Hanoi, Vietnam; Venue: Tay Ho District Stadium; Level: International Challenge; Prize: $15,000; Format: 64MS/32WS/32MD/32WD/32XD	Score: 21–18, 21–10	
20 March	Vietnam International: Host: Hanoi, Vietnam; Venue: Tay Ho District Stadium; Level: International Challenge; Prize: $15,000; Format: 64MS/32WS/32MD/32WD/32XD	(Indonesia) Jafar Hidayatullah (Indonesia) Aisyah Salsabila Putri Pranata	(Thailand) Tanupat Viriyangkura (Thailand) Ornnicha Jongsathapornparn
20 March	Vietnam International: Host: Hanoi, Vietnam; Venue: Tay Ho District Stadium; Level: International Challenge; Prize: $15,000; Format: 64MS/32WS/32MD/32WD/32XD	Score: 19–21, 21–14, 22–20	
27 March	Spain Masters (Draw): Host: Madrid, Spain; Venue: Centro Deportivo Municipal Gallur; Level: Super 300; Prize: $210,000; Format: 32MS/32WS/32MD/32WD/32XD	(Japan) Kenta Nishimoto	(Japan) Kanta Tsuneyama
27 March	Spain Masters (Draw): Host: Madrid, Spain; Venue: Centro Deportivo Municipal Gallur; Level: Super 300; Prize: $210,000; Format: 32MS/32WS/32MD/32WD/32XD	Score: 15–21, 21–18, 21–19	
27 March	Spain Masters (Draw): Host: Madrid, Spain; Venue: Centro Deportivo Municipal Gallur; Level: Super 300; Prize: $210,000; Format: 32MS/32WS/32MD/32WD/32XD	(Indonesia) Gregoria Mariska Tunjung	(India) P. V. Sindhu
27 March	Spain Masters (Draw): Host: Madrid, Spain; Venue: Centro Deportivo Municipal Gallur; Level: Super 300; Prize: $210,000; Format: 32MS/32WS/32MD/32WD/32XD	Score: 21–8, 21–8	
27 March	Spain Masters (Draw): Host: Madrid, Spain; Venue: Centro Deportivo Municipal Gallur; Level: Super 300; Prize: $210,000; Format: 32MS/32WS/32MD/32WD/32XD	(China) He Jiting (China) Zhou Haodong	(Chinese Taipei) Lee Fang-chih (Chinese Taipei) Lee Fang-jen
27 March	Spain Masters (Draw): Host: Madrid, Spain; Venue: Centro Deportivo Municipal Gallur; Level: Super 300; Prize: $210,000; Format: 32MS/32WS/32MD/32WD/32XD	Score: 21–5, 21–12	
27 March	Spain Masters (Draw): Host: Madrid, Spain; Venue: Centro Deportivo Municipal Gallur; Level: Super 300; Prize: $210,000; Format: 32MS/32WS/32MD/32WD/32XD	(China) Liu Shengshu (China) Tan Ning	(China) Chen Fanghui (China) Du Yue
27 March	Spain Masters (Draw): Host: Madrid, Spain; Venue: Centro Deportivo Municipal Gallur; Level: Super 300; Prize: $210,000; Format: 32MS/32WS/32MD/32WD/32XD	Score: 21–8, 16–21, 21–18	
27 March	Spain Masters (Draw): Host: Madrid, Spain; Venue: Centro Deportivo Municipal Gallur; Level: Super 300; Prize: $210,000; Format: 32MS/32WS/32MD/32WD/32XD	(Denmark) Mathias Christiansen (Denmark) Alexandra Bøje	(Indonesia) Praveen Jordan (Indonesia) Melati Daeva Oktavianti
27 March	Spain Masters (Draw): Host: Madrid, Spain; Venue: Centro Deportivo Municipal Gallur; Level: Super 300; Prize: $210,000; Format: 32MS/32WS/32MD/32WD/32XD	Score: 22–20, 21–18	
27 March	Osaka International: Host: Moriguchi, Osaka, Japan; Venue: Moriguchi City Gymnasium; Level: International Challenge; Prize: $25,000; Format: 32MS/32WS/32MD/32WD/32XD	(Japan) Yushi Tanaka	(Indonesia) Alwi Farhan
27 March	Osaka International: Host: Moriguchi, Osaka, Japan; Venue: Moriguchi City Gymnasium; Level: International Challenge; Prize: $25,000; Format: 32MS/32WS/32MD/32WD/32XD	Score: 15–21, 21–14, 21–17	
27 March	Osaka International: Host: Moriguchi, Osaka, Japan; Venue: Moriguchi City Gymnasium; Level: International Challenge; Prize: $25,000; Format: 32MS/32WS/32MD/32WD/32XD	(Japan) Shiori Saito	(Japan) Hina Akechi
27 March	Osaka International: Host: Moriguchi, Osaka, Japan; Venue: Moriguchi City Gymnasium; Level: International Challenge; Prize: $25,000; Format: 32MS/32WS/32MD/32WD/32XD	Score: 21–15, 21–13	
27 March	Osaka International: Host: Moriguchi, Osaka, Japan; Venue: Moriguchi City Gymnasium; Level: International Challenge; Prize: $25,000; Format: 32MS/32WS/32MD/32WD/32XD	(Japan) Hiroki Midorikawa (Japan) Kyohei Yamashita	(Chinese Taipei) Wei Chun-wei (Chinese Taipei) Wu Guan-xun
27 March	Osaka International: Host: Moriguchi, Osaka, Japan; Venue: Moriguchi City Gymnasium; Level: International Challenge; Prize: $25,000; Format: 32MS/32WS/32MD/32WD/32XD	Score: 21–14, 21–14	
27 March	Osaka International: Host: Moriguchi, Osaka, Japan; Venue: Moriguchi City Gymnasium; Level: International Challenge; Prize: $25,000; Format: 32MS/32WS/32MD/32WD/32XD	(South Korea) Lee Yu-lim (South Korea) Shin Seung-chan	(Japan) Mizuki Otake (Japan) Miyu Takahashi
27 March	Osaka International: Host: Moriguchi, Osaka, Japan; Venue: Moriguchi City Gymnasium; Level: International Challenge; Prize: $25,000; Format: 32MS/32WS/32MD/32WD/32XD	Score: 23–21, 21–13	
27 March	Osaka International: Host: Moriguchi, Osaka, Japan; Venue: Moriguchi City Gymnasium; Level: International Challenge; Prize: $25,000; Format: 32MS/32WS/32MD/32WD/32XD	(South Korea) Wang Chan (South Korea) Shin Seung-chan	(South Korea) Kim Young-hyuk (South Korea) Lee Yu-lim
27 March	Osaka International: Host: Moriguchi, Osaka, Japan; Venue: Moriguchi City Gymnasium; Level: International Challenge; Prize: $25,000; Format: 32MS/32WS/32MD/32WD/32XD	Score: 21–14, 14–21, 21–15	

=== April ===
Week commencing	Tournament	Champions	Runners-up
3 April	Orléans Masters (Draw): Host: Orléans, France; Venue: Palais des Sports; Level: Super 300; Prize: $240,000; Format: 32MS/32WS/32MD/32WD/32XD	(India) Priyanshu Rajawat	(Denmark) Magnus Johannesen
3 April	Orléans Masters (Draw): Host: Orléans, France; Venue: Palais des Sports; Level: Super 300; Prize: $240,000; Format: 32MS/32WS/32MD/32WD/32XD	Score: 21–15, 19–21, 21–16	
3 April	Orléans Masters (Draw): Host: Orléans, France; Venue: Palais des Sports; Level: Super 300; Prize: $240,000; Format: 32MS/32WS/32MD/32WD/32XD	(Spain) Carolina Marín	(United States) Beiwen Zhang
3 April	Orléans Masters (Draw): Host: Orléans, France; Venue: Palais des Sports; Level: Super 300; Prize: $240,000; Format: 32MS/32WS/32MD/32WD/32XD	Score: 25–23, 9–21, 21–10	
3 April	Orléans Masters (Draw): Host: Orléans, France; Venue: Palais des Sports; Level: Super 300; Prize: $240,000; Format: 32MS/32WS/32MD/32WD/32XD	(China) Chen Boyang (China) Liu Yi	(Indonesia) Muhammad Shohibul Fikri (Indonesia) Bagas Maulana
3 April	Orléans Masters (Draw): Host: Orléans, France; Venue: Palais des Sports; Level: Super 300; Prize: $240,000; Format: 32MS/32WS/32MD/32WD/32XD	Score: 21–19, 21–17	
3 April	Orléans Masters (Draw): Host: Orléans, France; Venue: Palais des Sports; Level: Super 300; Prize: $240,000; Format: 32MS/32WS/32MD/32WD/32XD	(Japan) Rena Miyaura (Japan) Ayako Sakuramoto	(China) Liu Shengshu (China) Tan Ning
3 April	Orléans Masters (Draw): Host: Orléans, France; Venue: Palais des Sports; Level: Super 300; Prize: $240,000; Format: 32MS/32WS/32MD/32WD/32XD	Score: 21–19, 16–21, 21–12	
3 April	Orléans Masters (Draw): Host: Orléans, France; Venue: Palais des Sports; Level: Super 300; Prize: $240,000; Format: 32MS/32WS/32MD/32WD/32XD	(Malaysia) Chen Tang Jie (Malaysia) Toh Ee Wei	(Chinese Taipei) Ye Hong-wei (Chinese Taipei) Lee Chia-hsin
3 April	Orléans Masters (Draw): Host: Orléans, France; Venue: Palais des Sports; Level: Super 300; Prize: $240,000; Format: 32MS/32WS/32MD/32WD/32XD	Score: 21–19, 21–17	
10 April	Dutch International: Host: Wateringen, Netherlands; Venue: VELO Hall; Level: International Series; Prize: $10,000; Format: 32MS/32WS/32MD/32WD/32XD	(Belgium) Julien Carraggi	(Netherlands) Joran Kweekel
10 April	Dutch International: Host: Wateringen, Netherlands; Venue: VELO Hall; Level: International Series; Prize: $10,000; Format: 32MS/32WS/32MD/32WD/32XD	Score: 21–17, 17–21, 21–16	
10 April	Dutch International: Host: Wateringen, Netherlands; Venue: VELO Hall; Level: International Series; Prize: $10,000; Format: 32MS/32WS/32MD/32WD/32XD	(Chinese Taipei) Huang Yu-hsun	(Bulgaria) Kaloyana Nalbantova
10 April	Dutch International: Host: Wateringen, Netherlands; Venue: VELO Hall; Level: International Series; Prize: $10,000; Format: 32MS/32WS/32MD/32WD/32XD	Score: 21–10, 21–11	
10 April	Dutch International: Host: Wateringen, Netherlands; Venue: VELO Hall; Level: International Series; Prize: $10,000; Format: 32MS/32WS/32MD/32WD/32XD	(Japan) Kazuhiro Ichikawa (Japan) Daiki Umayahara	(England) Rory Easton (England) Zach Russ
10 April	Dutch International: Host: Wateringen, Netherlands; Venue: VELO Hall; Level: International Series; Prize: $10,000; Format: 32MS/32WS/32MD/32WD/32XD	Score: 13–21, 21–18, 21–19	
10 April	Dutch International: Host: Wateringen, Netherlands; Venue: VELO Hall; Level: International Series; Prize: $10,000; Format: 32MS/32WS/32MD/32WD/32XD	(Chinese Taipei) Hsu Yin-hui (Chinese Taipei) Lee Chih-chen	(Japan) Hina Osawa (Japan) Miku Shigeta
10 April	Dutch International: Host: Wateringen, Netherlands; Venue: VELO Hall; Level: International Series; Prize: $10,000; Format: 32MS/32WS/32MD/32WD/32XD	Score: 21–14, 21–17	
10 April	Dutch International: Host: Wateringen, Netherlands; Venue: VELO Hall; Level: International Series; Prize: $10,000; Format: 32MS/32WS/32MD/32WD/32XD	(Australia) Kenneth Choo (Australia) Gronya Somerville	(England) Brandon Yap (England) Annie Lado
10 April	Dutch International: Host: Wateringen, Netherlands; Venue: VELO Hall; Level: International Series; Prize: $10,000; Format: 32MS/32WS/32MD/32WD/32XD	Score: 21–18, 23–21	
24 April	Badminton Asia Championships (Draw): Host: Dubai, United Arab Emirates; Venue: Rashid bin Hamdan Indoor Hall; Level: Continental Championships; Format: 32MS/32WS/32MD/32WD/32XD	(Indonesia) Anthony Sinisuka Ginting	(Singapore) Loh Kean Yew
24 April	Badminton Asia Championships (Draw): Host: Dubai, United Arab Emirates; Venue: Rashid bin Hamdan Indoor Hall; Level: Continental Championships; Format: 32MS/32WS/32MD/32WD/32XD	Score: 21–12, 21–8	
24 April	Badminton Asia Championships (Draw): Host: Dubai, United Arab Emirates; Venue: Rashid bin Hamdan Indoor Hall; Level: Continental Championships; Format: 32MS/32WS/32MD/32WD/32XD	(Chinese Taipei) Tai Tzu-ying	(South Korea) An Se-young
24 April	Badminton Asia Championships (Draw): Host: Dubai, United Arab Emirates; Venue: Rashid bin Hamdan Indoor Hall; Level: Continental Championships; Format: 32MS/32WS/32MD/32WD/32XD	Score: 21–10, 21–14	
24 April	Badminton Asia Championships (Draw): Host: Dubai, United Arab Emirates; Venue: Rashid bin Hamdan Indoor Hall; Level: Continental Championships; Format: 32MS/32WS/32MD/32WD/32XD	(India) Satwiksairaj Rankireddy (India) Chirag Shetty	(Malaysia) Ong Yew Sin (Malaysia) Teo Ee Yi
24 April	Badminton Asia Championships (Draw): Host: Dubai, United Arab Emirates; Venue: Rashid bin Hamdan Indoor Hall; Level: Continental Championships; Format: 32MS/32WS/32MD/32WD/32XD	Score: 16–21, 21–17, 21–19	
24 April	Badminton Asia Championships (Draw): Host: Dubai, United Arab Emirates; Venue: Rashid bin Hamdan Indoor Hall; Level: Continental Championships; Format: 32MS/32WS/32MD/32WD/32XD	(Japan) Yuki Fukushima (Japan) Sayaka Hirota	(South Korea) Baek Ha-na (South Korea) Lee So-hee
24 April	Badminton Asia Championships (Draw): Host: Dubai, United Arab Emirates; Venue: Rashid bin Hamdan Indoor Hall; Level: Continental Championships; Format: 32MS/32WS/32MD/32WD/32XD	Score: 21–7, 21–14	
24 April	Badminton Asia Championships (Draw): Host: Dubai, United Arab Emirates; Venue: Rashid bin Hamdan Indoor Hall; Level: Continental Championships; Format: 32MS/32WS/32MD/32WD/32XD	(China) Jiang Zhenbang (China) Wei Yaxin	(China) Zheng Siwei (China) Huang Yaqiong
24 April	Badminton Asia Championships (Draw): Host: Dubai, United Arab Emirates; Venue: Rashid bin Hamdan Indoor Hall; Level: Continental Championships; Format: 32MS/32WS/32MD/32WD/32XD	Score: 21–15, 21–16	
24 April	Pan American Badminton Championships (Draw): Host: Kingston, Jamaica; Venue: G.C. Foster College of Physical Education and Sport; Level: Continental Championships; Format: 64MS/64WS/32MD/32WD/64XD	(Canada) Brian Yang	(El Salvador) Uriel Canjura
24 April	Pan American Badminton Championships (Draw): Host: Kingston, Jamaica; Venue: G.C. Foster College of Physical Education and Sport; Level: Continental Championships; Format: 64MS/64WS/32MD/32WD/64XD	Score: 21–10, 21–5	
24 April	Pan American Badminton Championships (Draw): Host: Kingston, Jamaica; Venue: G.C. Foster College of Physical Education and Sport; Level: Continental Championships; Format: 64MS/64WS/32MD/32WD/64XD	(Canada) Michelle Li	(United States) Beiwen Zhang
24 April	Pan American Badminton Championships (Draw): Host: Kingston, Jamaica; Venue: G.C. Foster College of Physical Education and Sport; Level: Continental Championships; Format: 64MS/64WS/32MD/32WD/64XD	Score: 21–19, 21–9	
24 April	Pan American Badminton Championships (Draw): Host: Kingston, Jamaica; Venue: G.C. Foster College of Physical Education and Sport; Level: Continental Championships; Format: 64MS/64WS/32MD/32WD/64XD	(Canada) Adam Dong (Canada) Nyl Yakura	(Canada) Kevin Lee (Canada) Ty Alexander Lindeman
24 April	Pan American Badminton Championships (Draw): Host: Kingston, Jamaica; Venue: G.C. Foster College of Physical Education and Sport; Level: Continental Championships; Format: 64MS/64WS/32MD/32WD/64XD	Score: 21–10, 16–21, 22–20	
24 April	Pan American Badminton Championships (Draw): Host: Kingston, Jamaica; Venue: G.C. Foster College of Physical Education and Sport; Level: Continental Championships; Format: 64MS/64WS/32MD/32WD/64XD	(Canada) Catherine Choi (Canada) Josephine Wu	(United States) Francesca Corbett (United States) Allison Lee
24 April	Pan American Badminton Championships (Draw): Host: Kingston, Jamaica; Venue: G.C. Foster College of Physical Education and Sport; Level: Continental Championships; Format: 64MS/64WS/32MD/32WD/64XD	Score: 21–14, 21–18	
24 April	Pan American Badminton Championships (Draw): Host: Kingston, Jamaica; Venue: G.C. Foster College of Physical Education and Sport; Level: Continental Championships; Format: 64MS/64WS/32MD/32WD/64XD	(Canada) Joshua Hurlburt-Yu (Canada) Rachel Honderich	(Canada) Ty Alexander Lindeman (Canada) Josephine Wu
24 April	Pan American Badminton Championships (Draw): Host: Kingston, Jamaica; Venue: G.C. Foster College of Physical Education and Sport; Level: Continental Championships; Format: 64MS/64WS/32MD/32WD/64XD	Score: 22–20, 18–21, 21–17	

=== May ===
Week commencing	Tournament	Champions	Runners-up
1 May	Mexican International: Host: Guadalajara, Mexico; Venue: CODE II Jalisco; Level: International Challenge; Prize: $15,000; Format: 64MS/64WS/32MD/16WD/32XD	(Czech Republic) Jan Louda	(Ukraine) Danylo Bosniuk
1 May	Mexican International: Host: Guadalajara, Mexico; Venue: CODE II Jalisco; Level: International Challenge; Prize: $15,000; Format: 64MS/64WS/32MD/16WD/32XD	Score: 21–10, 22–24, 21–15	
1 May	Mexican International: Host: Guadalajara, Mexico; Venue: CODE II Jalisco; Level: International Challenge; Prize: $15,000; Format: 64MS/64WS/32MD/16WD/32XD	(Japan) Manami Suizu	(Canada) Wen Yu Zhang
1 May	Mexican International: Host: Guadalajara, Mexico; Venue: CODE II Jalisco; Level: International Challenge; Prize: $15,000; Format: 64MS/64WS/32MD/16WD/32XD	Score: 21–13, 21–10	
1 May	Mexican International: Host: Guadalajara, Mexico; Venue: CODE II Jalisco; Level: International Challenge; Prize: $15,000; Format: 64MS/64WS/32MD/16WD/32XD	(Denmark) Daniel Lundgaard (Denmark) Mads Vestergaard	(Germany) Bjarne Geiss (Germany) Jan Colin Völker
1 May	Mexican International: Host: Guadalajara, Mexico; Venue: CODE II Jalisco; Level: International Challenge; Prize: $15,000; Format: 64MS/64WS/32MD/16WD/32XD	Score: 22–24, 21–19, 21–17	
1 May	Mexican International: Host: Guadalajara, Mexico; Venue: CODE II Jalisco; Level: International Challenge; Prize: $15,000; Format: 64MS/64WS/32MD/16WD/32XD	(Japan) Sayaka Hobara (Japan) Yui Suizu	(United States) Francesca Corbett (United States) Allison Lee
1 May	Mexican International: Host: Guadalajara, Mexico; Venue: CODE II Jalisco; Level: International Challenge; Prize: $15,000; Format: 64MS/64WS/32MD/16WD/32XD	Score: 21–11, 23–21	
1 May	Mexican International: Host: Guadalajara, Mexico; Venue: CODE II Jalisco; Level: International Challenge; Prize: $15,000; Format: 64MS/64WS/32MD/16WD/32XD	(United States) Vinson Chiu (United States) Jennie Gai	(Canada) Ty Alexander Lindeman (Canada) Josephine Wu
1 May	Mexican International: Host: Guadalajara, Mexico; Venue: CODE II Jalisco; Level: International Challenge; Prize: $15,000; Format: 64MS/64WS/32MD/16WD/32XD	Score: 22–20, 21–16	
1 May	Luxembourg Open: Host: Luxembourg City, Luxembourg; Venue: Centre National Sportif et Culturel d'Coque; Level: International Series; Prize: $5,000; Format: 32MS/32WS/32MD/32WD/32XD	(India) Sankar Subramanian	(Azerbaijan) Ade Resky Dwicahyo
1 May	Luxembourg Open: Host: Luxembourg City, Luxembourg; Venue: Centre National Sportif et Culturel d'Coque; Level: International Series; Prize: $5,000; Format: 32MS/32WS/32MD/32WD/32XD	Score: 21–11, 21–19	
1 May	Luxembourg Open: Host: Luxembourg City, Luxembourg; Venue: Centre National Sportif et Culturel d'Coque; Level: International Series; Prize: $5,000; Format: 32MS/32WS/32MD/32WD/32XD	(Japan) Hina Akechi	(Chinese Taipei) Chiang Ying-li
1 May	Luxembourg Open: Host: Luxembourg City, Luxembourg; Venue: Centre National Sportif et Culturel d'Coque; Level: International Series; Prize: $5,000; Format: 32MS/32WS/32MD/32WD/32XD	Score: 18–21, 21–15, 21–12	
1 May	Luxembourg Open: Host: Luxembourg City, Luxembourg; Venue: Centre National Sportif et Culturel d'Coque; Level: International Series; Prize: $5,000; Format: 32MS/32WS/32MD/32WD/32XD	(Denmark) William Kryger Boe (Denmark) Christian Faust Kjaer	(Malaysia) Lau Yi Sheng (Malaysia) Lee Yi Bo
1 May	Luxembourg Open: Host: Luxembourg City, Luxembourg; Venue: Centre National Sportif et Culturel d'Coque; Level: International Series; Prize: $5,000; Format: 32MS/32WS/32MD/32WD/32XD	Score: 21–19, 21–19	
1 May	Luxembourg Open: Host: Luxembourg City, Luxembourg; Venue: Centre National Sportif et Culturel d'Coque; Level: International Series; Prize: $5,000; Format: 32MS/32WS/32MD/32WD/32XD	(Netherlands) Kirsten de Wit (Netherlands) Alyssa Tirtosentono	(Denmark) Amalie Cecilie Kudsk (Denmark) Signe Schulz
1 May	Luxembourg Open: Host: Luxembourg City, Luxembourg; Venue: Centre National Sportif et Culturel d'Coque; Level: International Series; Prize: $5,000; Format: 32MS/32WS/32MD/32WD/32XD	Score: 21–14, 8–21, 21–19	
1 May	Luxembourg Open: Host: Luxembourg City, Luxembourg; Venue: Centre National Sportif et Culturel d'Coque; Level: International Series; Prize: $5,000; Format: 32MS/32WS/32MD/32WD/32XD	(Germany) Patrick Scheiel (Germany) Franziska Volkmann	(Denmark) Andreas Søndergaard (Denmark) Iben Bergstein
1 May	Luxembourg Open: Host: Luxembourg City, Luxembourg; Venue: Centre National Sportif et Culturel d'Coque; Level: International Series; Prize: $5,000; Format: 32MS/32WS/32MD/32WD/32XD	Score: 25–23, 21–17	
8 May	2023 SEA Games – Men's team (Draw): Host: Phnom Penh, Cambodia; Venue: Morodok Techo Badminton Hall; Level: Multisport; Format: 7 teams	Indonesia	Malaysia
8 May	2023 SEA Games – Men's team (Draw): Host: Phnom Penh, Cambodia; Venue: Morodok Techo Badminton Hall; Level: Multisport; Format: 7 teams	Chico Aura Dwi Wardoyo	Leong Jun Hao
8 May	2023 SEA Games – Men's team (Draw): Host: Phnom Penh, Cambodia; Venue: Morodok Techo Badminton Hall; Level: Multisport; Format: 7 teams	Muhammad Shohibul Fikri; Bagas Maulana	Beh Chun Meng; Goh Boon Zhe
8 May	2023 SEA Games – Men's team (Draw): Host: Phnom Penh, Cambodia; Venue: Morodok Techo Badminton Hall; Level: Multisport; Format: 7 teams	Christian Adinata	Lee Shun Yang
8 May	2023 SEA Games – Men's team (Draw): Host: Phnom Penh, Cambodia; Venue: Morodok Techo Badminton Hall; Level: Multisport; Format: 7 teams	Pramudya Kusumawardana; Yeremia Rambitan	Chia Wei Jie; Liew Xun
8 May	2023 SEA Games – Men's team (Draw): Host: Phnom Penh, Cambodia; Venue: Morodok Techo Badminton Hall; Level: Multisport; Format: 7 teams	Alwi Farhan	Kok Jing Hong
8 May	2023 SEA Games – Men's team (Draw): Host: Phnom Penh, Cambodia; Venue: Morodok Techo Badminton Hall; Level: Multisport; Format: 7 teams	Score: 3–1	
8 May	2023 SEA Games – Women's team (Draw): Host: Phnom Penh, Cambodia; Venue: Morodok Techo Badminton Hall; Level: Multisport; Format: 7 teams	Thailand	Indonesia
8 May	2023 SEA Games – Women's team (Draw): Host: Phnom Penh, Cambodia; Venue: Morodok Techo Badminton Hall; Level: Multisport; Format: 7 teams	Lalinrat Chaiwan	Komang Ayu Cahya Dewi
8 May	2023 SEA Games – Women's team (Draw): Host: Phnom Penh, Cambodia; Venue: Morodok Techo Badminton Hall; Level: Multisport; Format: 7 teams	Jongkolphan Kititharakul; Rawinda Prajongjai	Febriana Dwipuji Kusuma; Amalia Cahaya Pratiwi
8 May	2023 SEA Games – Women's team (Draw): Host: Phnom Penh, Cambodia; Venue: Morodok Techo Badminton Hall; Level: Multisport; Format: 7 teams	Supanida Katethong	Ester Nurumi Tri Wardoyo
8 May	2023 SEA Games – Women's team (Draw): Host: Phnom Penh, Cambodia; Venue: Morodok Techo Badminton Hall; Level: Multisport; Format: 7 teams	Benyapa Aimsaard; Nuntakarn Aimsaard	Meilysa Trias Puspita Sari; Rachel Allessya Rose
8 May	2023 SEA Games – Women's team (Draw): Host: Phnom Penh, Cambodia; Venue: Morodok Techo Badminton Hall; Level: Multisport; Format: 7 teams	Pitchamon Opatniput	Mutiara Ayu Puspitasari
8 May	2023 SEA Games – Women's team (Draw): Host: Phnom Penh, Cambodia; Venue: Morodok Techo Badminton Hall; Level: Multisport; Format: 7 teams	Score: 3–0	
8 May	2023 SEA Games – Mixed team (Draw): Host: Phnom Penh, Cambodia; Venue: Morodok Techo Badminton Hall; Level: Multisport; Format: 5 teams	Cambodia	Myanmar
8 May	2023 SEA Games – Mixed team (Draw): Host: Phnom Penh, Cambodia; Venue: Morodok Techo Badminton Hall; Level: Multisport; Format: 5 teams	Sok Rikreay	Hein Htut
8 May	2023 SEA Games – Mixed team (Draw): Host: Phnom Penh, Cambodia; Venue: Morodok Techo Badminton Hall; Level: Multisport; Format: 5 teams	Seavty Teav	Thet Htar Thuzar
8 May	2023 SEA Games – Mixed team (Draw): Host: Phnom Penh, Cambodia; Venue: Morodok Techo Badminton Hall; Level: Multisport; Format: 5 teams	Chheng Huy; Chourng Meng	Zun Myo Thet; Thwe Tar Oo
8 May	2023 SEA Games – Mixed team (Draw): Host: Phnom Penh, Cambodia; Venue: Morodok Techo Badminton Hall; Level: Multisport; Format: 5 teams	Heng Mengleap; Yam Samnang	Hein Htut; Arkar Phone Myat
8 May	2023 SEA Games – Mixed team (Draw): Host: Phnom Penh, Cambodia; Venue: Morodok Techo Badminton Hall; Level: Multisport; Format: 5 teams	Sok Rikreay; Chourng Meng	Aung Myo Htoo; Thet Htar Thuzar
8 May	2023 SEA Games – Mixed team (Draw): Host: Phnom Penh, Cambodia; Venue: Morodok Techo Badminton Hall; Level: Multisport; Format: 5 teams	Score: 3–2	
8 May	2023 SEA Games – Individual event (Draw): Host: Phnom Penh, Cambodia; Venue: Morodok Techo Badminton Hall; Level: Multisport; Format: 32MS/16WS/16MD/16WD/16XD	(Indonesia) Christian Adinata	(Indonesia) Chico Aura Dwi Wardoyo
8 May	2023 SEA Games – Individual event (Draw): Host: Phnom Penh, Cambodia; Venue: Morodok Techo Badminton Hall; Level: Multisport; Format: 32MS/16WS/16MD/16WD/16XD	Score: 21–12, 18–21, 21–18	
8 May	2023 SEA Games – Individual event (Draw): Host: Phnom Penh, Cambodia; Venue: Morodok Techo Badminton Hall; Level: Multisport; Format: 32MS/16WS/16MD/16WD/16XD	(Thailand) Supanida Katethong	(Thailand) Lalinrat Chaiwan
8 May	2023 SEA Games – Individual event (Draw): Host: Phnom Penh, Cambodia; Venue: Morodok Techo Badminton Hall; Level: Multisport; Format: 32MS/16WS/16MD/16WD/16XD	Score: 21–12, 21–14	
8 May	2023 SEA Games – Individual event (Draw): Host: Phnom Penh, Cambodia; Venue: Morodok Techo Badminton Hall; Level: Multisport; Format: 32MS/16WS/16MD/16WD/16XD	(Indonesia) Pramudya Kusumawardana (Indonesia) Yeremia Rambitan	(Thailand) Peeratchai Sukphun (Thailand) Pakkapon Teeraratsakul
8 May	2023 SEA Games – Individual event (Draw): Host: Phnom Penh, Cambodia; Venue: Morodok Techo Badminton Hall; Level: Multisport; Format: 32MS/16WS/16MD/16WD/16XD	Score: 21–17, 21–19	
8 May	2023 SEA Games – Individual event (Draw): Host: Phnom Penh, Cambodia; Venue: Morodok Techo Badminton Hall; Level: Multisport; Format: 32MS/16WS/16MD/16WD/16XD	(Indonesia) Febriana Dwipuji Kusuma (Indonesia) Amalia Cahaya Pratiwi	(Indonesia) Meilysa Trias Puspita Sari (Indonesia) Rachel Allessya Rose
8 May	2023 SEA Games – Individual event (Draw): Host: Phnom Penh, Cambodia; Venue: Morodok Techo Badminton Hall; Level: Multisport; Format: 32MS/16WS/16MD/16WD/16XD	Score: 21–17, 21–16	
8 May	2023 SEA Games – Individual event (Draw): Host: Phnom Penh, Cambodia; Venue: Morodok Techo Badminton Hall; Level: Multisport; Format: 32MS/16WS/16MD/16WD/16XD	(Indonesia) Rehan Naufal Kusharjanto (Indonesia) Lisa Ayu Kusumawati	(Malaysia) Yap Roy King (Malaysia) Cheng Su Yin
8 May	2023 SEA Games – Individual event (Draw): Host: Phnom Penh, Cambodia; Venue: Morodok Techo Badminton Hall; Level: Multisport; Format: 32MS/16WS/16MD/16WD/16XD	Score: 20–22, 21–8, 21–16	
8 May	Swedish Open: Host: Uppsala, Sweden; Venue: IFU Arena; Level: International Series; Prize: $10,000; Format: 32MS/32WS/32MD/32WD/32XD	(Denmark) Victor Svendsen	(Finland) Kalle Koljonen
8 May	Swedish Open: Host: Uppsala, Sweden; Venue: IFU Arena; Level: International Series; Prize: $10,000; Format: 32MS/32WS/32MD/32WD/32XD	Score: 21–14, 21–11	
8 May	Swedish Open: Host: Uppsala, Sweden; Venue: IFU Arena; Level: International Series; Prize: $10,000; Format: 32MS/32WS/32MD/32WD/32XD	(Japan) Hina Akechi	(Hong Kong) Lo Sin Yan
8 May	Swedish Open: Host: Uppsala, Sweden; Venue: IFU Arena; Level: International Series; Prize: $10,000; Format: 32MS/32WS/32MD/32WD/32XD	Score: 21–12, 21–14	
8 May	Swedish Open: Host: Uppsala, Sweden; Venue: IFU Arena; Level: International Series; Prize: $10,000; Format: 32MS/32WS/32MD/32WD/32XD	(Indonesia) Raymond Indra (Indonesia) Daniel Edgar Marvino	(Indonesia) Teges Satriaji Cahyo Hutomo (Indonesia) Christopher David Wijaya
8 May	Swedish Open: Host: Uppsala, Sweden; Venue: IFU Arena; Level: International Series; Prize: $10,000; Format: 32MS/32WS/32MD/32WD/32XD	Score: 21–13, 19–21, 21–10	
8 May	Swedish Open: Host: Uppsala, Sweden; Venue: IFU Arena; Level: International Series; Prize: $10,000; Format: 32MS/32WS/32MD/32WD/32XD	(Japan) Maiko Kawazoe (Japan) Sorano Yoshikawa	(Japan) Kanano Muroya (Japan) Miku Sugiyama
8 May	Swedish Open: Host: Uppsala, Sweden; Venue: IFU Arena; Level: International Series; Prize: $10,000; Format: 32MS/32WS/32MD/32WD/32XD	Score: 21–17, 21–7	
8 May	Swedish Open: Host: Uppsala, Sweden; Venue: IFU Arena; Level: International Series; Prize: $10,000; Format: 32MS/32WS/32MD/32WD/32XD	(Indonesia) Jafar Hidayatullah (Indonesia) Aisyah Salsabila Putri Pranata	(Denmark) Sebastian Bugtrup (Denmark) Mai Surrow
8 May	Swedish Open: Host: Uppsala, Sweden; Venue: IFU Arena; Level: International Series; Prize: $10,000; Format: 32MS/32WS/32MD/32WD/32XD	Score: 21–19, 19–21, 21–13	
14 May	Sudirman Cup (Draw): Host: Suzhou, China; Venue: Suzhou Olympic Sports Centre; Level: World Mixed Team Championships; Format: 16 teams	China	South Korea
14 May	Sudirman Cup (Draw): Host: Suzhou, China; Venue: Suzhou Olympic Sports Centre; Level: World Mixed Team Championships; Format: 16 teams	Zheng Siwei; Huang Yaqiong	Seo Seung-jae; Chae Yoo-jung
14 May	Sudirman Cup (Draw): Host: Suzhou, China; Venue: Suzhou Olympic Sports Centre; Level: World Mixed Team Championships; Format: 16 teams	Shi Yuqi	Lee Yun-gyu
14 May	Sudirman Cup (Draw): Host: Suzhou, China; Venue: Suzhou Olympic Sports Centre; Level: World Mixed Team Championships; Format: 16 teams	Chen Yufei	An Se-young
14 May	Sudirman Cup (Draw): Host: Suzhou, China; Venue: Suzhou Olympic Sports Centre; Level: World Mixed Team Championships; Format: 16 teams	Liang Weikeng; Wang Chang	Kim Won-ho; Na Sung-seung
14 May	Sudirman Cup (Draw): Host: Suzhou, China; Venue: Suzhou Olympic Sports Centre; Level: World Mixed Team Championships; Format: 16 teams	Chen Qingchen; Jia Yifan	Baek Ha-na; Lee So-hee
14 May	Sudirman Cup (Draw): Host: Suzhou, China; Venue: Suzhou Olympic Sports Centre; Level: World Mixed Team Championships; Format: 16 teams	Score: 3–0	
14 May	Slovenia Open: Host: Maribor, Slovenia; Venue: Dras center; Level: International Challenge; Prize: $15,000; Format: 32MS/32WS/32MD/32WD/32XD	(India) Sameer Verma	(Chinese Taipei) Su Li-yang
14 May	Slovenia Open: Host: Maribor, Slovenia; Venue: Dras center; Level: International Challenge; Prize: $15,000; Format: 32MS/32WS/32MD/32WD/32XD	Score: 21–18, 21–14	
14 May	Slovenia Open: Host: Maribor, Slovenia; Venue: Dras center; Level: International Challenge; Prize: $15,000; Format: 32MS/32WS/32MD/32WD/32XD	(Chinese Taipei) Huang Yu-hsun	(Turkey) Neslihan Yiğit
14 May	Slovenia Open: Host: Maribor, Slovenia; Venue: Dras center; Level: International Challenge; Prize: $15,000; Format: 32MS/32WS/32MD/32WD/32XD	Score: 21–17, 21–17	
14 May	Slovenia Open: Host: Maribor, Slovenia; Venue: Dras center; Level: International Challenge; Prize: $15,000; Format: 32MS/32WS/32MD/32WD/32XD	(Malaysia) Low Hang Yee (Malaysia) Ng Eng Cheong	(Malaysia) Lwi Sheng Hao (Malaysia) Jimmy Wong
14 May	Slovenia Open: Host: Maribor, Slovenia; Venue: Dras center; Level: International Challenge; Prize: $15,000; Format: 32MS/32WS/32MD/32WD/32XD	Score: 22–20, 21–18	
14 May	Slovenia Open: Host: Maribor, Slovenia; Venue: Dras center; Level: International Challenge; Prize: $15,000; Format: 32MS/32WS/32MD/32WD/32XD	(Chinese Taipei) Liu Chiao-yun (Chinese Taipei) Wang Yu-qiao	(Chinese Taipei) Hsu Yin-hui (Chinese Taipei) Lee Chih-chen
14 May	Slovenia Open: Host: Maribor, Slovenia; Venue: Dras center; Level: International Challenge; Prize: $15,000; Format: 32MS/32WS/32MD/32WD/32XD	Score: 21–12, 21–13	
14 May	Slovenia Open: Host: Maribor, Slovenia; Venue: Dras center; Level: International Challenge; Prize: $15,000; Format: 32MS/32WS/32MD/32WD/32XD	(Denmark) Jesper Toft (Denmark) Clara Graversen	(India) Rohan Kapoor (India) N. Sikki Reddy
14 May	Slovenia Open: Host: Maribor, Slovenia; Venue: Dras center; Level: International Challenge; Prize: $15,000; Format: 32MS/32WS/32MD/32WD/32XD	Score: 21–12, 21–13	
22 May	Malaysia Masters (Draw): Host: Kuala Lumpur, Malaysia; Venue: Axiata Arena; Level: Super 500; Prize: $420,000; Format: 32MS/32WS/32MD/32WD/32XD	(India) Prannoy H. S.	(China) Weng Hongyang
22 May	Malaysia Masters (Draw): Host: Kuala Lumpur, Malaysia; Venue: Axiata Arena; Level: Super 500; Prize: $420,000; Format: 32MS/32WS/32MD/32WD/32XD	Score: 21–19, 13–21, 21–18	
22 May	Malaysia Masters (Draw): Host: Kuala Lumpur, Malaysia; Venue: Axiata Arena; Level: Super 500; Prize: $420,000; Format: 32MS/32WS/32MD/32WD/32XD	(Japan) Akane Yamaguchi	(Indonesia) Gregoria Mariska Tunjung
22 May	Malaysia Masters (Draw): Host: Kuala Lumpur, Malaysia; Venue: Axiata Arena; Level: Super 500; Prize: $420,000; Format: 32MS/32WS/32MD/32WD/32XD	Score: 21–17, 21–7	
22 May	Malaysia Masters (Draw): Host: Kuala Lumpur, Malaysia; Venue: Axiata Arena; Level: Super 500; Prize: $420,000; Format: 32MS/32WS/32MD/32WD/32XD	(South Korea) Kang Min-hyuk (South Korea) Seo Seung-jae	(Malaysia) Man Wei Chong (Malaysia) Tee Kai Wun
22 May	Malaysia Masters (Draw): Host: Kuala Lumpur, Malaysia; Venue: Axiata Arena; Level: Super 500; Prize: $420,000; Format: 32MS/32WS/32MD/32WD/32XD	Score: 21–15, 22–24, 21–19	
22 May	Malaysia Masters (Draw): Host: Kuala Lumpur, Malaysia; Venue: Axiata Arena; Level: Super 500; Prize: $420,000; Format: 32MS/32WS/32MD/32WD/32XD	(South Korea) Baek Ha-na (South Korea) Lee So-hee	(Malaysia) Pearly Tan (Malaysia) Thinaah Muralitharan
22 May	Malaysia Masters (Draw): Host: Kuala Lumpur, Malaysia; Venue: Axiata Arena; Level: Super 500; Prize: $420,000; Format: 32MS/32WS/32MD/32WD/32XD	Score: 22–20, 8–21, 21–17	
22 May	Malaysia Masters (Draw): Host: Kuala Lumpur, Malaysia; Venue: Axiata Arena; Level: Super 500; Prize: $420,000; Format: 32MS/32WS/32MD/32WD/32XD	(Thailand) Dechapol Puavaranukroh (Thailand) Sapsiree Taerattanachai	(China) Feng Yanzhe (China) Huang Dongping
22 May	Malaysia Masters (Draw): Host: Kuala Lumpur, Malaysia; Venue: Axiata Arena; Level: Super 500; Prize: $420,000; Format: 32MS/32WS/32MD/32WD/32XD	Score: 16–21, 21–13, 21–18	
22 May	Austrian Open: Host: Graz, Austria; Venue: Raiffeisen Sportpark; Level: International Series; Prize: $5,000; Format: 32MS/32WS/32MD/32WD/32XD	(Belgium) Julien Carraggi	(Chinese Taipei) Huang Yu-kai
22 May	Austrian Open: Host: Graz, Austria; Venue: Raiffeisen Sportpark; Level: International Series; Prize: $5,000; Format: 32MS/32WS/32MD/32WD/32XD	Score: 21–19, 21–10	
22 May	Austrian Open: Host: Graz, Austria; Venue: Raiffeisen Sportpark; Level: International Series; Prize: $5,000; Format: 32MS/32WS/32MD/32WD/32XD	(Chinese Taipei) Wang Yu-si	(Chinese Taipei) Huang Yu-hsun
22 May	Austrian Open: Host: Graz, Austria; Venue: Raiffeisen Sportpark; Level: International Series; Prize: $5,000; Format: 32MS/32WS/32MD/32WD/32XD	Score: 21–13, 21–19	
22 May	Austrian Open: Host: Graz, Austria; Venue: Raiffeisen Sportpark; Level: International Series; Prize: $5,000; Format: 32MS/32WS/32MD/32WD/32XD	(Malaysia) Low Hang Yee (Malaysia) Ng Eng Cheong	(Malaysia) Lwi Sheng Hao (Malaysia) Jimmy Wong
22 May	Austrian Open: Host: Graz, Austria; Venue: Raiffeisen Sportpark; Level: International Series; Prize: $5,000; Format: 32MS/32WS/32MD/32WD/32XD	Score: 21–11, 21–17	
22 May	Austrian Open: Host: Graz, Austria; Venue: Raiffeisen Sportpark; Level: International Series; Prize: $5,000; Format: 32MS/32WS/32MD/32WD/32XD	(Chinese Taipei) Liu Chiao-yun (Chinese Taipei) Wang Yu-qiao	(Chinese Taipei) Hsu Yin-hui (Chinese Taipei) Lee Chih-chen
22 May	Austrian Open: Host: Graz, Austria; Venue: Raiffeisen Sportpark; Level: International Series; Prize: $5,000; Format: 32MS/32WS/32MD/32WD/32XD	Score: 21–15, 21–17	
22 May	Austrian Open: Host: Graz, Austria; Venue: Raiffeisen Sportpark; Level: International Series; Prize: $5,000; Format: 32MS/32WS/32MD/32WD/32XD	(England) Ethan van Leeuwen (England) Annie Lado	(Malaysia) Lim Tze Jian (Malaysia) Desiree Siow Hao Shan
22 May	Austrian Open: Host: Graz, Austria; Venue: Raiffeisen Sportpark; Level: International Series; Prize: $5,000; Format: 32MS/32WS/32MD/32WD/32XD	Score: 21–13, 21–13	
29 May	Thailand Open (Draw): Host: Pak Kret, Thailand; Venue: Impact Arena; Level: Super 500; Prize: $420,000; Format: 32MS/32WS/32MD/32WD/32XD	(Thailand) Kunlavut Vitidsarn	(Hong Kong) Lee Cheuk Yiu
29 May	Thailand Open (Draw): Host: Pak Kret, Thailand; Venue: Impact Arena; Level: Super 500; Prize: $420,000; Format: 32MS/32WS/32MD/32WD/32XD	Score: 21–12, 21–10	
29 May	Thailand Open (Draw): Host: Pak Kret, Thailand; Venue: Impact Arena; Level: Super 500; Prize: $420,000; Format: 32MS/32WS/32MD/32WD/32XD	(South Korea) An Se-young	(China) He Bingjiao
29 May	Thailand Open (Draw): Host: Pak Kret, Thailand; Venue: Impact Arena; Level: Super 500; Prize: $420,000; Format: 32MS/32WS/32MD/32WD/32XD	Score: 21–10, 21–19	
29 May	Thailand Open (Draw): Host: Pak Kret, Thailand; Venue: Impact Arena; Level: Super 500; Prize: $420,000; Format: 32MS/32WS/32MD/32WD/32XD	(China) Liang Weikeng (China) Wang Chang	(Indonesia) Muhammad Shohibul Fikri (Indonesia) Bagas Maulana
29 May	Thailand Open (Draw): Host: Pak Kret, Thailand; Venue: Impact Arena; Level: Super 500; Prize: $420,000; Format: 32MS/32WS/32MD/32WD/32XD	Score: 21–10, 21–15	
29 May	Thailand Open (Draw): Host: Pak Kret, Thailand; Venue: Impact Arena; Level: Super 500; Prize: $420,000; Format: 32MS/32WS/32MD/32WD/32XD	(South Korea) Kim So-yeong (South Korea) Kong Hee-yong	(Thailand) Benyapa Aimsaard (Thailand) Nuntakarn Aimsaard
29 May	Thailand Open (Draw): Host: Pak Kret, Thailand; Venue: Impact Arena; Level: Super 500; Prize: $420,000; Format: 32MS/32WS/32MD/32WD/32XD	Score: 21–13, 21–17	
29 May	Thailand Open (Draw): Host: Pak Kret, Thailand; Venue: Impact Arena; Level: Super 500; Prize: $420,000; Format: 32MS/32WS/32MD/32WD/32XD	(South Korea) Kim Won-ho (South Korea) Jeong Na-eun	(Thailand) Dechapol Puavaranukroh (Thailand) Sapsiree Taerattanachai
29 May	Thailand Open (Draw): Host: Pak Kret, Thailand; Venue: Impact Arena; Level: Super 500; Prize: $420,000; Format: 32MS/32WS/32MD/32WD/32XD	Score: 11–21, 21–19, 22–20	
29 May	Italian International (cancelled) (Note: This tournament, originally to be played on 1–4 June, was later cancelled.): Host: Milan, Italy; Venue: PalaBadminton; Level: International Challenge; Prize: $15,000; Format: 32MS/32WS/32MD/32WD/32XD		
29 May	Italian International (cancelled): Host: Milan, Italy; Venue: PalaBadminton; Level: International Challenge; Prize: $15,000; Format: 32MS/32WS/32MD/32WD/32XD	Score:	
29 May	Italian International (cancelled): Host: Milan, Italy; Venue: PalaBadminton; Level: International Challenge; Prize: $15,000; Format: 32MS/32WS/32MD/32WD/32XD	Score:	
29 May	Italian International (cancelled): Host: Milan, Italy; Venue: PalaBadminton; Level: International Challenge; Prize: $15,000; Format: 32MS/32WS/32MD/32WD/32XD	Score:	
29 May	Italian International (cancelled): Host: Milan, Italy; Venue: PalaBadminton; Level: International Challenge; Prize: $15,000; Format: 32MS/32WS/32MD/32WD/32XD	Score:	
29 May	Italian International (cancelled): Host: Milan, Italy; Venue: PalaBadminton; Level: International Challenge; Prize: $15,000; Format: 32MS/32WS/32MD/32WD/32XD	Score:	
29 May	Kazakhstan Future Series: Host: Shymkent, Kazakhstan; Venue: Center of Badminton; Level: Future Series; Format: 64MS/32WS/16MD/16WD/32XD	(Kazakhstan) Dmitriy Panarin	(Vietnam) Lê Đức Phát
29 May	Kazakhstan Future Series: Host: Shymkent, Kazakhstan; Venue: Center of Badminton; Level: Future Series; Format: 64MS/32WS/16MD/16WD/32XD	Score: 21–15, 22–20	
29 May	Kazakhstan Future Series: Host: Shymkent, Kazakhstan; Venue: Center of Badminton; Level: Future Series; Format: 64MS/32WS/16MD/16WD/32XD	(India) Jiya Rawat	(India) Aalisha Naik
29 May	Kazakhstan Future Series: Host: Shymkent, Kazakhstan; Venue: Center of Badminton; Level: Future Series; Format: 64MS/32WS/16MD/16WD/32XD	Score: Walkover	
29 May	Kazakhstan Future Series: Host: Shymkent, Kazakhstan; Venue: Center of Badminton; Level: Future Series; Format: 64MS/32WS/16MD/16WD/32XD	(Philippines) Solomon Padiz Jr. (Philippines) Julius Villabrille	(India) Abhyuday Choudhary (India) Zhakuo Seyie
29 May	Kazakhstan Future Series: Host: Shymkent, Kazakhstan; Venue: Center of Badminton; Level: Future Series; Format: 64MS/32WS/16MD/16WD/32XD	Score: 21–13, 21–8	
29 May	Kazakhstan Future Series: Host: Shymkent, Kazakhstan; Venue: Center of Badminton; Level: Future Series; Format: 64MS/32WS/16MD/16WD/32XD	(Indonesia) Nethania Irawan (Indonesia) Fuyu Iwasaki	(India) Rutaparna Panda (India) Swetaparna Panda
29 May	Kazakhstan Future Series: Host: Shymkent, Kazakhstan; Venue: Center of Badminton; Level: Future Series; Format: 64MS/32WS/16MD/16WD/32XD	Score: 21–13, 21–15	
29 May	Kazakhstan Future Series: Host: Shymkent, Kazakhstan; Venue: Center of Badminton; Level: Future Series; Format: 64MS/32WS/16MD/16WD/32XD	(Israel) Maxim Grinblat (Israel) Anna Kirillova	(Kazakhstan) Khaitmurat Kulmatov (Kazakhstan) Aisha Zhumabek
29 May	Kazakhstan Future Series: Host: Shymkent, Kazakhstan; Venue: Center of Badminton; Level: Future Series; Format: 64MS/32WS/16MD/16WD/32XD	Score: 21–10, 21–17	
29 May	Bonn International: Host: Bonn, Germany; Venue: Erwin Kranz Halle; Level: Future Series; Format: 32MS/32WS/32MD/32WD/32XD	(Chinese Taipei) Wang Po-wei	(Chinese Taipei) Kuo Kuan-lin
29 May	Bonn International: Host: Bonn, Germany; Venue: Erwin Kranz Halle; Level: Future Series; Format: 32MS/32WS/32MD/32WD/32XD	Score: 21–15, 21–10	
29 May	Bonn International: Host: Bonn, Germany; Venue: Erwin Kranz Halle; Level: Future Series; Format: 32MS/32WS/32MD/32WD/32XD	(Chinese Taipei) Hung Yi-ting	(Chinese Taipei) Huang Ching-ping
29 May	Bonn International: Host: Bonn, Germany; Venue: Erwin Kranz Halle; Level: Future Series; Format: 32MS/32WS/32MD/32WD/32XD	Score: 21–17, 22–20	
29 May	Bonn International: Host: Bonn, Germany; Venue: Erwin Kranz Halle; Level: Future Series; Format: 32MS/32WS/32MD/32WD/32XD	(Chinese Taipei) Chen Bo-yuan (Chinese Taipei) Lin Shang-kai	(Spain) Ernesto Baschwitz (Spain) Alvaro Leal
29 May	Bonn International: Host: Bonn, Germany; Venue: Erwin Kranz Halle; Level: Future Series; Format: 32MS/32WS/32MD/32WD/32XD	Score: 21–13, 21–12	
29 May	Bonn International: Host: Bonn, Germany; Venue: Erwin Kranz Halle; Level: Future Series; Format: 32MS/32WS/32MD/32WD/32XD	(Turkey) Bengisu Erçetin (Turkey) Nazlıcan İnci	(Chinese Taipei) Liu Zi-xi (Chinese Taipei) Yang Yi-hsun
29 May	Bonn International: Host: Bonn, Germany; Venue: Erwin Kranz Halle; Level: Future Series; Format: 32MS/32WS/32MD/32WD/32XD	Score: 21–11, 21–9	
29 May	Bonn International: Host: Bonn, Germany; Venue: Erwin Kranz Halle; Level: Future Series; Format: 32MS/32WS/32MD/32WD/32XD	(Germany) Malik Bourakkadi (Germany) Leona Michalski	(Chinese Taipei) Chen Bo-yuan (Chinese Taipei) Chung Kan-yu
29 May	Bonn International: Host: Bonn, Germany; Venue: Erwin Kranz Halle; Level: Future Series; Format: 32MS/32WS/32MD/32WD/32XD	Score: 21–14, 18–21, 21–18	
29 May	Chile International: Host: Santiago, Chile; Venue: Centro Entrenamiento Olimpico; Level: Future Series; Format: 32MS/32WS/16MD/8WD/16XD	(Italy) Fabio Caponio	(United States) Kevin Arokia Walter
29 May	Chile International: Host: Santiago, Chile; Venue: Centro Entrenamiento Olimpico; Level: Future Series; Format: 32MS/32WS/16MD/8WD/16XD	Score: 21–19, 25–27, 21–19	
29 May	Chile International: Host: Santiago, Chile; Venue: Centro Entrenamiento Olimpico; Level: Future Series; Format: 32MS/32WS/16MD/8WD/16XD	(Italy) Yasmine Hamza	(Peru) Inés Castillo
29 May	Chile International: Host: Santiago, Chile; Venue: Centro Entrenamiento Olimpico; Level: Future Series; Format: 32MS/32WS/16MD/8WD/16XD	Score: 21–10, 21–16	
29 May	Chile International: Host: Santiago, Chile; Venue: Centro Entrenamiento Olimpico; Level: Future Series; Format: 32MS/32WS/16MD/8WD/16XD	(England) Kelvin Ho (Jamaica) Samuel Ricketts	(Paraguay) Leo Lee (Canada) Wong Yan Kit
29 May	Chile International: Host: Santiago, Chile; Venue: Centro Entrenamiento Olimpico; Level: Future Series; Format: 32MS/32WS/16MD/8WD/16XD	Score: 21–13, 21–13	
29 May	Chile International: Host: Santiago, Chile; Venue: Centro Entrenamiento Olimpico; Level: Future Series; Format: 32MS/32WS/16MD/8WD/16XD	(Peru) Estefania Canchanya (Peru) Valeria Chuquimaqui	(Peru) Sofia Junco (Peru) Rafaela Silva
29 May	Chile International: Host: Santiago, Chile; Venue: Centro Entrenamiento Olimpico; Level: Future Series; Format: 32MS/32WS/16MD/8WD/16XD	Score: 21–10, 21–6	
29 May	Chile International: Host: Santiago, Chile; Venue: Centro Entrenamiento Olimpico; Level: Future Series; Format: 32MS/32WS/16MD/8WD/16XD	(Jamaica) Samuel Ricketts (Jamaica) Tahlia Richardson	(Argentina) Santiago Otero (Argentina) Iona Gualdi
29 May	Chile International: Host: Santiago, Chile; Venue: Centro Entrenamiento Olimpico; Level: Future Series; Format: 32MS/32WS/16MD/8WD/16XD	Score: 16–21, 21–5, 21–15	

=== June ===
Week commencing	Tournament	Champions	Runners-up
5 June	Singapore Open (Draw): Host: Singapore; Venue: Singapore Indoor Stadium; Level: Super 750; Prize: $850,000; Format: 32MS/32WS/32MD/32WD/32XD	(Indonesia) Anthony Sinisuka Ginting	(Denmark) Anders Antonsen
5 June	Singapore Open (Draw): Host: Singapore; Venue: Singapore Indoor Stadium; Level: Super 750; Prize: $850,000; Format: 32MS/32WS/32MD/32WD/32XD	Score: 21–16, 21–13	
5 June	Singapore Open (Draw): Host: Singapore; Venue: Singapore Indoor Stadium; Level: Super 750; Prize: $850,000; Format: 32MS/32WS/32MD/32WD/32XD	(South Korea) An Se-young	(Japan) Akane Yamaguchi
5 June	Singapore Open (Draw): Host: Singapore; Venue: Singapore Indoor Stadium; Level: Super 750; Prize: $850,000; Format: 32MS/32WS/32MD/32WD/32XD	Score: 21–16, 21–14	
5 June	Singapore Open (Draw): Host: Singapore; Venue: Singapore Indoor Stadium; Level: Super 750; Prize: $850,000; Format: 32MS/32WS/32MD/32WD/32XD	(Japan) Takuro Hoki (Japan) Yugo Kobayashi	(China) Liang Weikeng (China) Wang Chang
5 June	Singapore Open (Draw): Host: Singapore; Venue: Singapore Indoor Stadium; Level: Super 750; Prize: $850,000; Format: 32MS/32WS/32MD/32WD/32XD	Score: 21–13, 21–18	
5 June	Singapore Open (Draw): Host: Singapore; Venue: Singapore Indoor Stadium; Level: Super 750; Prize: $850,000; Format: 32MS/32WS/32MD/32WD/32XD	(China) Chen Qingchen (China) Jia Yifan	(South Korea) Baek Ha-na (South Korea) Lee So-hee
5 June	Singapore Open (Draw): Host: Singapore; Venue: Singapore Indoor Stadium; Level: Super 750; Prize: $850,000; Format: 32MS/32WS/32MD/32WD/32XD	Score: 21–16, 21–12	
5 June	Singapore Open (Draw): Host: Singapore; Venue: Singapore Indoor Stadium; Level: Super 750; Prize: $850,000; Format: 32MS/32WS/32MD/32WD/32XD	(Denmark) Mathias Christiansen (Denmark) Alexandra Bøje	(Japan) Yuta Watanabe (Japan) Arisa Higashino
5 June	Singapore Open (Draw): Host: Singapore; Venue: Singapore Indoor Stadium; Level: Super 750; Prize: $850,000; Format: 32MS/32WS/32MD/32WD/32XD	Score: 21–14, 20–22, 21–16	
5 June	Northern Marianas Open: Host: Saipan, Northern Mariana Islands; Venue: Gilbert C. Ada Gymnasium; Level: International Challenge; Prize: $15,000; Format: 64MS/32WS/32MD/32WD/32XD	(Chinese Taipei) Liao Jhuo-fu	(South Korea) Jeon Hyeok-jin
5 June	Northern Marianas Open: Host: Saipan, Northern Mariana Islands; Venue: Gilbert C. Ada Gymnasium; Level: International Challenge; Prize: $15,000; Format: 64MS/32WS/32MD/32WD/32XD	Score: 21–15, 21–14	
5 June	Northern Marianas Open: Host: Saipan, Northern Mariana Islands; Venue: Gilbert C. Ada Gymnasium; Level: International Challenge; Prize: $15,000; Format: 64MS/32WS/32MD/32WD/32XD	(South Korea) Kim Ga-ram	(Japan) Tomoka Miyazaki
5 June	Northern Marianas Open: Host: Saipan, Northern Mariana Islands; Venue: Gilbert C. Ada Gymnasium; Level: International Challenge; Prize: $15,000; Format: 64MS/32WS/32MD/32WD/32XD	Score: 15–21, 25–23, 21–13	
5 June	Northern Marianas Open: Host: Saipan, Northern Mariana Islands; Venue: Gilbert C. Ada Gymnasium; Level: International Challenge; Prize: $15,000; Format: 64MS/32WS/32MD/32WD/32XD	(Chinese Taipei) Wei Chun-wei (Chinese Taipei) Wu Guan-xun	(South Korea) Jin Yong (South Korea) Na Sung-seung
5 June	Northern Marianas Open: Host: Saipan, Northern Mariana Islands; Venue: Gilbert C. Ada Gymnasium; Level: International Challenge; Prize: $15,000; Format: 64MS/32WS/32MD/32WD/32XD	Score: 21–11, 15–21, 21–18	
5 June	Northern Marianas Open: Host: Saipan, Northern Mariana Islands; Venue: Gilbert C. Ada Gymnasium; Level: International Challenge; Prize: $15,000; Format: 64MS/32WS/32MD/32WD/32XD	(Chinese Taipei) Hsu Ya-ching (Chinese Taipei) Lin Wan-ching	(South Korea) Lee Yu-lim (South Korea) Shin Seung-chan
5 June	Northern Marianas Open: Host: Saipan, Northern Mariana Islands; Venue: Gilbert C. Ada Gymnasium; Level: International Challenge; Prize: $15,000; Format: 64MS/32WS/32MD/32WD/32XD	Score: 21–19, 18–21, 22–20	
5 June	Northern Marianas Open: Host: Saipan, Northern Mariana Islands; Venue: Gilbert C. Ada Gymnasium; Level: International Challenge; Prize: $15,000; Format: 64MS/32WS/32MD/32WD/32XD	(South Korea) Wang Chan (South Korea) Shin Seung-chan	(Japan) Hashiru Shimono (Japan) Miku Shigeta
5 June	Northern Marianas Open: Host: Saipan, Northern Mariana Islands; Venue: Gilbert C. Ada Gymnasium; Level: International Challenge; Prize: $15,000; Format: 64MS/32WS/32MD/32WD/32XD	Score: 21–13, 21–15	
5 June	Maldives International: Host: Malé, Maldives; Venue: Malé Sports Complex; Level: International Challenge; Prize: $15,000; Format: 64MS/64WS/32MD/32WD/32XD	(India) Ravi	(Malaysia) Soong Joo Ven
5 June	Maldives International: Host: Malé, Maldives; Venue: Malé Sports Complex; Level: International Challenge; Prize: $15,000; Format: 64MS/64WS/32MD/32WD/32XD	Score: 21–19, 21–18	
5 June	Maldives International: Host: Malé, Maldives; Venue: Malé Sports Complex; Level: International Challenge; Prize: $15,000; Format: 64MS/64WS/32MD/32WD/32XD	(India) Ashmita Chaliha	(India) Tasnim Mir
5 June	Maldives International: Host: Malé, Maldives; Venue: Malé Sports Complex; Level: International Challenge; Prize: $15,000; Format: 64MS/64WS/32MD/32WD/32XD	Score: 19–21, 21–17, 21–11	
5 June	Maldives International: Host: Malé, Maldives; Venue: Malé Sports Complex; Level: International Challenge; Prize: $15,000; Format: 64MS/64WS/32MD/32WD/32XD	(Thailand) Pharanyu Kaosamaang (Thailand) Worrapol Thongsa-nga	(Malaysia) Low Hang Yee (Malaysia) Ng Eng Cheong
5 June	Maldives International: Host: Malé, Maldives; Venue: Malé Sports Complex; Level: International Challenge; Prize: $15,000; Format: 64MS/64WS/32MD/32WD/32XD	Score: 21–19, 21–16	
5 June	Maldives International: Host: Malé, Maldives; Venue: Malé Sports Complex; Level: International Challenge; Prize: $15,000; Format: 64MS/64WS/32MD/32WD/32XD	(Thailand) Laksika Kanlaha (Thailand) Phataimas Muenwong	(India) K. Ashwini Bhat (India) Shikha Gautam
5 June	Maldives International: Host: Malé, Maldives; Venue: Malé Sports Complex; Level: International Challenge; Prize: $15,000; Format: 64MS/64WS/32MD/32WD/32XD	Score: 24–22, 21–15	
5 June	Maldives International: Host: Malé, Maldives; Venue: Malé Sports Complex; Level: International Challenge; Prize: $15,000; Format: 64MS/64WS/32MD/32WD/32XD	(Malaysia) Hoo Pang Ron (Malaysia) Teoh Mei Xing	(United States) Vinson Chiu (United States) Jennie Gai
5 June	Maldives International: Host: Malé, Maldives; Venue: Malé Sports Complex; Level: International Challenge; Prize: $15,000; Format: 64MS/64WS/32MD/32WD/32XD	Score: 21–13, 21–18	
5 June	Denmark Masters: Host: Hillerød, Denmark; Venue: Royal Stage; Level: International Challenge; Prize: $25,000; Format: 32MS/32WS/32MD/32WD/32XD	(Chinese Taipei) Huang Yu-kai	(Netherlands) Mark Caljouw
5 June	Denmark Masters: Host: Hillerød, Denmark; Venue: Royal Stage; Level: International Challenge; Prize: $25,000; Format: 32MS/32WS/32MD/32WD/32XD	Score: 21–18, 21–13	
5 June	Denmark Masters: Host: Hillerød, Denmark; Venue: Royal Stage; Level: International Challenge; Prize: $25,000; Format: 32MS/32WS/32MD/32WD/32XD	(Estonia) Kristin Kuuba	(Indonesia) Komang Ayu Cahya Dewi
5 June	Denmark Masters: Host: Hillerød, Denmark; Venue: Royal Stage; Level: International Challenge; Prize: $25,000; Format: 32MS/32WS/32MD/32WD/32XD	Score: 16–21, 21–16, 21–10	
5 June	Denmark Masters: Host: Hillerød, Denmark; Venue: Royal Stage; Level: International Challenge; Prize: $25,000; Format: 32MS/32WS/32MD/32WD/32XD	(Denmark) Rasmus Kjær (Denmark) Frederik Søgaard	(Chinese Taipei) Lu Ming-che (Chinese Taipei) Tang Kai-wei
5 June	Denmark Masters: Host: Hillerød, Denmark; Venue: Royal Stage; Level: International Challenge; Prize: $25,000; Format: 32MS/32WS/32MD/32WD/32XD	Score: 21–5, 21–16	
5 June	Denmark Masters: Host: Hillerød, Denmark; Venue: Royal Stage; Level: International Challenge; Prize: $25,000; Format: 32MS/32WS/32MD/32WD/32XD	(Chinese Taipei) Hsieh Pei-shan (Chinese Taipei) Tseng Yu-chi	(Chinese Taipei) Liu Chiao-yun (Chinese Taipei) Wang Yu-qiao
5 June	Denmark Masters: Host: Hillerød, Denmark; Venue: Royal Stage; Level: International Challenge; Prize: $25,000; Format: 32MS/32WS/32MD/32WD/32XD	Score: 21–16, 21–19	
5 June	Denmark Masters: Host: Hillerød, Denmark; Venue: Royal Stage; Level: International Challenge; Prize: $25,000; Format: 32MS/32WS/32MD/32WD/32XD	(India) Rohan Kapoor (India) N. Sikki Reddy	(Denmark) Mads Vestergaard (Denmark) Christine Busch
5 June	Denmark Masters: Host: Hillerød, Denmark; Venue: Royal Stage; Level: International Challenge; Prize: $25,000; Format: 32MS/32WS/32MD/32WD/32XD	Score: 21–16, 21–17	
5 June	Santo Domingo Open: Host: Santo Domingo, Dominican Republic; Venue: Virgilio TRavieso Soto; Level: International Series; Prize: $5,000; Format: 32MS/32WS/16MD/16WD/16XD	(Brazil) Jonathan Matias	(United States) Mark Alcala
5 June	Santo Domingo Open: Host: Santo Domingo, Dominican Republic; Venue: Virgilio TRavieso Soto; Level: International Series; Prize: $5,000; Format: 32MS/32WS/16MD/16WD/16XD	Score: 17–21, 21–12, 21–7	
5 June	Santo Domingo Open: Host: Santo Domingo, Dominican Republic; Venue: Virgilio TRavieso Soto; Level: International Series; Prize: $5,000; Format: 32MS/32WS/16MD/16WD/16XD	(Brazil) Juliana Vieira	(Brazil) Sâmia Lima
5 June	Santo Domingo Open: Host: Santo Domingo, Dominican Republic; Venue: Virgilio TRavieso Soto; Level: International Series; Prize: $5,000; Format: 32MS/32WS/16MD/16WD/16XD	Score: 21–7, 21–3	
5 June	Santo Domingo Open: Host: Santo Domingo, Dominican Republic; Venue: Virgilio TRavieso Soto; Level: International Series; Prize: $5,000; Format: 32MS/32WS/16MD/16WD/16XD	(Mexico) Job Castillo (Mexico) Luis Montoya	(Brazil) Fabrício Farias (Brazil) Davi Silva
5 June	Santo Domingo Open: Host: Santo Domingo, Dominican Republic; Venue: Virgilio TRavieso Soto; Level: International Series; Prize: $5,000; Format: 32MS/32WS/16MD/16WD/16XD	Score: 23–21, 15–21, 21–19	
5 June	Santo Domingo Open: Host: Santo Domingo, Dominican Republic; Venue: Virgilio TRavieso Soto; Level: International Series; Prize: $5,000; Format: 32MS/32WS/16MD/16WD/16XD	(Brazil) Sânia Lima (Brazil) Juliana Vieira	(Brazil) Jaqueline Lima (Brazil) Sâmia Lima
5 June	Santo Domingo Open: Host: Santo Domingo, Dominican Republic; Venue: Virgilio TRavieso Soto; Level: International Series; Prize: $5,000; Format: 32MS/32WS/16MD/16WD/16XD	Score: 21–16, 24–22	
5 June	Santo Domingo Open: Host: Santo Domingo, Dominican Republic; Venue: Virgilio TRavieso Soto; Level: International Series; Prize: $5,000; Format: 32MS/32WS/16MD/16WD/16XD	(Algeria) Koceila Mammeri (Algeria) Tanina Mammeri	(Mexico) Luis Montoya (Mexico) Miriam Rodríguez
5 June	Santo Domingo Open: Host: Santo Domingo, Dominican Republic; Venue: Virgilio TRavieso Soto; Level: International Series; Prize: $5,000; Format: 32MS/32WS/16MD/16WD/16XD	Score: 21–13, 21–19	
5 June	Lithuanian International: Host: Panevėžys, Lithuania; Venue: Cido Arena; Level: Future Series; Format: 32MS/32WS/32MD/32WD/32XD	(Germany) Matthias Kicklitz	(Germany) Oei Kian-yu
5 June	Lithuanian International: Host: Panevėžys, Lithuania; Venue: Cido Arena; Level: Future Series; Format: 32MS/32WS/32MD/32WD/32XD	Score: 21–11, 21–12	
5 June	Lithuanian International: Host: Panevėžys, Lithuania; Venue: Cido Arena; Level: Future Series; Format: 32MS/32WS/32MD/32WD/32XD	(Indonesia) Deswanti Hujansih Nurtertiati	(Indonesia) Chiara Marvella Handoyo
5 June	Lithuanian International: Host: Panevėžys, Lithuania; Venue: Cido Arena; Level: Future Series; Format: 32MS/32WS/32MD/32WD/32XD	Score: 21–14, 21–17	
5 June	Lithuanian International: Host: Panevėžys, Lithuania; Venue: Cido Arena; Level: Future Series; Format: 32MS/32WS/32MD/32WD/32XD	(Indonesia) Putra Erwiansyah (Indonesia) Patra Harapan Rindorindo	(Indonesia) Muhammad Al Farizi (Indonesia) Nikolaus Joaquin
5 June	Lithuanian International: Host: Panevėžys, Lithuania; Venue: Cido Arena; Level: Future Series; Format: 32MS/32WS/32MD/32WD/32XD	Score: 8–21, 21–19, 21–12	
5 June	Lithuanian International: Host: Panevėžys, Lithuania; Venue: Cido Arena; Level: Future Series; Format: 32MS/32WS/32MD/32WD/32XD	(Estonia) Kati-Kreet Marran (Estonia) Helina Rüütel	(Indonesia) Meisa Rizka Fitria (Indonesia) Maulida Aprilia Putri
5 June	Lithuanian International: Host: Panevėžys, Lithuania; Venue: Cido Arena; Level: Future Series; Format: 32MS/32WS/32MD/32WD/32XD	Score: 18–21, 23–21, 21–7	
5 June	Lithuanian International: Host: Panevėžys, Lithuania; Venue: Cido Arena; Level: Future Series; Format: 32MS/32WS/32MD/32WD/32XD	(Indonesia) Marwan Faza (Indonesia) Jessica Maya Rismawardani	(Indonesia) Zaidan Arrafi Nabawi (Indonesia) Felisha Pasaribu
5 June	Lithuanian International: Host: Panevėžys, Lithuania; Venue: Cido Arena; Level: Future Series; Format: 32MS/32WS/32MD/32WD/32XD	Score: 16–21, 21–16, 21–13	
12 June	Indonesia Open (Draw): Host: Jakarta, Indonesia; Venue: Istora Gelora Bung Karno; Level: Super 1000; Prize: $1,250,000; Format: 32MS/32WS/32MD/32WD/32XD	(Denmark) Viktor Axelsen	(Indonesia) Anthony Sinisuka Ginting
12 June	Indonesia Open (Draw): Host: Jakarta, Indonesia; Venue: Istora Gelora Bung Karno; Level: Super 1000; Prize: $1,250,000; Format: 32MS/32WS/32MD/32WD/32XD	Score: 21–14, 21–13	
12 June	Indonesia Open (Draw): Host: Jakarta, Indonesia; Venue: Istora Gelora Bung Karno; Level: Super 1000; Prize: $1,250,000; Format: 32MS/32WS/32MD/32WD/32XD	(China) Chen Yufei	(Spain) Carolina Marín
12 June	Indonesia Open (Draw): Host: Jakarta, Indonesia; Venue: Istora Gelora Bung Karno; Level: Super 1000; Prize: $1,250,000; Format: 32MS/32WS/32MD/32WD/32XD	Score: 21–18, 21–19	
12 June	Indonesia Open (Draw): Host: Jakarta, Indonesia; Venue: Istora Gelora Bung Karno; Level: Super 1000; Prize: $1,250,000; Format: 32MS/32WS/32MD/32WD/32XD	(India) Satwiksairaj Rankireddy (India) Chirag Shetty	(Malaysia) Aaron Chia (Malaysia) Soh Wooi Yik
12 June	Indonesia Open (Draw): Host: Jakarta, Indonesia; Venue: Istora Gelora Bung Karno; Level: Super 1000; Prize: $1,250,000; Format: 32MS/32WS/32MD/32WD/32XD	Score: 21–17, 21–18	
12 June	Indonesia Open (Draw): Host: Jakarta, Indonesia; Venue: Istora Gelora Bung Karno; Level: Super 1000; Prize: $1,250,000; Format: 32MS/32WS/32MD/32WD/32XD	(South Korea) Baek Ha-na (South Korea) Lee So-hee	(Japan) Yuki Fukushima (Japan) Sayaka Hirota
12 June	Indonesia Open (Draw): Host: Jakarta, Indonesia; Venue: Istora Gelora Bung Karno; Level: Super 1000; Prize: $1,250,000; Format: 32MS/32WS/32MD/32WD/32XD	Score: 22–20, 21–10	
12 June	Indonesia Open (Draw): Host: Jakarta, Indonesia; Venue: Istora Gelora Bung Karno; Level: Super 1000; Prize: $1,250,000; Format: 32MS/32WS/32MD/32WD/32XD	(China) Zheng Siwei (China) Huang Yaqiong	(Japan) Yuta Watanabe (Japan) Arisa Higashino
12 June	Indonesia Open (Draw): Host: Jakarta, Indonesia; Venue: Istora Gelora Bung Karno; Level: Super 1000; Prize: $1,250,000; Format: 32MS/32WS/32MD/32WD/32XD	Score: 21–14, 21–11	
12 June	Saipan International: Host: Saipan, Northern Mariana Islands; Venue: Gilbert C. Ada Gymnasium; Level: International Challenge; Prize: $15,000; Format: 64MS/32WS/32MD/32WD/32XD	(Japan) Takuma Obayashi	(South Korea) Jeon Hyeok-jin
12 June	Saipan International: Host: Saipan, Northern Mariana Islands; Venue: Gilbert C. Ada Gymnasium; Level: International Challenge; Prize: $15,000; Format: 64MS/32WS/32MD/32WD/32XD	Score: 21–19, 21–16	
12 June	Saipan International: Host: Saipan, Northern Mariana Islands; Venue: Gilbert C. Ada Gymnasium; Level: International Challenge; Prize: $15,000; Format: 64MS/32WS/32MD/32WD/32XD	(Japan) Tomoka Miyazaki	(South Korea) Kim Ga-ram
12 June	Saipan International: Host: Saipan, Northern Mariana Islands; Venue: Gilbert C. Ada Gymnasium; Level: International Challenge; Prize: $15,000; Format: 64MS/32WS/32MD/32WD/32XD	Score: 21–19, 14–21, 21–17	
12 June	Saipan International: Host: Saipan, Northern Mariana Islands; Venue: Gilbert C. Ada Gymnasium; Level: International Challenge; Prize: $15,000; Format: 64MS/32WS/32MD/32WD/32XD	(Chinese Taipei) Lee Fang-chih (Chinese Taipei) Lee Fang-jen	(Chinese Taipei) Chang Ko-chi (Chinese Taipei) Po Li-wei
12 June	Saipan International: Host: Saipan, Northern Mariana Islands; Venue: Gilbert C. Ada Gymnasium; Level: International Challenge; Prize: $15,000; Format: 64MS/32WS/32MD/32WD/32XD	Score: 30–29, 22–20	
12 June	Saipan International: Host: Saipan, Northern Mariana Islands; Venue: Gilbert C. Ada Gymnasium; Level: International Challenge; Prize: $15,000; Format: 64MS/32WS/32MD/32WD/32XD	(Chinese Taipei) Hsu Ya-ching (Chinese Taipei) Lin Wan-ching	(Japan) Sayaka Hobara (Japan) Yui Suizu
12 June	Saipan International: Host: Saipan, Northern Mariana Islands; Venue: Gilbert C. Ada Gymnasium; Level: International Challenge; Prize: $15,000; Format: 64MS/32WS/32MD/32WD/32XD	Score: 21–10, 21–18	
12 June	Saipan International: Host: Saipan, Northern Mariana Islands; Venue: Gilbert C. Ada Gymnasium; Level: International Challenge; Prize: $15,000; Format: 64MS/32WS/32MD/32WD/32XD	(United States) Presley Smith (United States) Allison Lee	(Chinese Taipei) Wei Chun-wei (Chinese Taipei) Nicole Gonzales Chan
12 June	Saipan International: Host: Saipan, Northern Mariana Islands; Venue: Gilbert C. Ada Gymnasium; Level: International Challenge; Prize: $15,000; Format: 64MS/32WS/32MD/32WD/32XD	Score: 20–22, 21–18, 21–14	
12 June	Nantes International: Host: Rezé, France; Venue: Salle metropolitaine de la Trocardière; Level: International Challenge; Prize: $15,000; Format: 32MS/32WS/32MD/32WD/32XD	(France) Arnaud Merklé	(Indonesia) Jason Christ Alexander
12 June	Nantes International: Host: Rezé, France; Venue: Salle metropolitaine de la Trocardière; Level: International Challenge; Prize: $15,000; Format: 32MS/32WS/32MD/32WD/32XD	Score: 21–18, 21–16	
12 June	Nantes International: Host: Rezé, France; Venue: Salle metropolitaine de la Trocardière; Level: International Challenge; Prize: $15,000; Format: 32MS/32WS/32MD/32WD/32XD	(Indonesia) Komang Ayu Cahya Dewi	(Chinese Taipei) Liang Ting-yu
12 June	Nantes International: Host: Rezé, France; Venue: Salle metropolitaine de la Trocardière; Level: International Challenge; Prize: $15,000; Format: 32MS/32WS/32MD/32WD/32XD	Score: 21–18, 13–21, 21–7	
12 June	Nantes International: Host: Rezé, France; Venue: Salle metropolitaine de la Trocardière; Level: International Challenge; Prize: $15,000; Format: 32MS/32WS/32MD/32WD/32XD	(Malaysia) Junaidi Arif (Malaysia) Yap Roy King	(Indonesia) Putra Erwiansyah (Indonesia) Patra Harapan Rindorindo
12 June	Nantes International: Host: Rezé, France; Venue: Salle metropolitaine de la Trocardière; Level: International Challenge; Prize: $15,000; Format: 32MS/32WS/32MD/32WD/32XD	Score: 21–16, 14–21, 21–12	
12 June	Nantes International: Host: Rezé, France; Venue: Salle metropolitaine de la Trocardière; Level: International Challenge; Prize: $15,000; Format: 32MS/32WS/32MD/32WD/32XD	(India) Tanisha Crasto (India) Ashwini Ponnappa	(Chinese Taipei) Hung En-tzu (Chinese Taipei) Lin Yu-pei
12 June	Nantes International: Host: Rezé, France; Venue: Salle metropolitaine de la Trocardière; Level: International Challenge; Prize: $15,000; Format: 32MS/32WS/32MD/32WD/32XD	Score: 21–15, 21–14	
12 June	Nantes International: Host: Rezé, France; Venue: Salle metropolitaine de la Trocardière; Level: International Challenge; Prize: $15,000; Format: 32MS/32WS/32MD/32WD/32XD	(Denmark) Mads Vestergaard (Denmark) Christine Busch	(India) K. Sai Pratheek (India) Tanisha Crasto
12 June	Nantes International: Host: Rezé, France; Venue: Salle metropolitaine de la Trocardière; Level: International Challenge; Prize: $15,000; Format: 32MS/32WS/32MD/32WD/32XD	Score: 14–21, 21–14, 21–17	
12 June	Peru Future Series: Host: Lima, Peru; Venue: Polideportivo Villa Deportiva, Club Regatas Lima; Level: Future Series; Format: 32MS/32WS/16MD/16WD/32XD	(Indonesia) Muhammad Sultan	(Indonesia) Muhammad Halim As Sidiq
12 June	Peru Future Series: Host: Lima, Peru; Venue: Polideportivo Villa Deportiva, Club Regatas Lima; Level: Future Series; Format: 32MS/32WS/16MD/16WD/32XD	Score: 21–17, 16–21, 21–18	
12 June	Peru Future Series: Host: Lima, Peru; Venue: Polideportivo Villa Deportiva, Club Regatas Lima; Level: Future Series; Format: 32MS/32WS/16MD/16WD/32XD	(Peru) Inés Castillo	(Peru) Fernanda Saponara
12 June	Peru Future Series: Host: Lima, Peru; Venue: Polideportivo Villa Deportiva, Club Regatas Lima; Level: Future Series; Format: 32MS/32WS/16MD/16WD/32XD	Score: 21–10, 21–11	
12 June	Peru Future Series: Host: Lima, Peru; Venue: Polideportivo Villa Deportiva, Club Regatas Lima; Level: Future Series; Format: 32MS/32WS/16MD/16WD/32XD	(England) Kelvin Ho (Jamaica) Samuel Ricketts	(Peru) Daniel la Torre (Peru) Diego Subauste
12 June	Peru Future Series: Host: Lima, Peru; Venue: Polideportivo Villa Deportiva, Club Regatas Lima; Level: Future Series; Format: 32MS/32WS/16MD/16WD/32XD	Score: 21–17, 21–11	
12 June	Peru Future Series: Host: Lima, Peru; Venue: Polideportivo Villa Deportiva, Club Regatas Lima; Level: Future Series; Format: 32MS/32WS/16MD/16WD/32XD	(Peru) Inés Castillo (Peru) Paula la Torre	(Peru) Fernanda Munar (Peru) Rafaela Munar
12 June	Peru Future Series: Host: Lima, Peru; Venue: Polideportivo Villa Deportiva, Club Regatas Lima; Level: Future Series; Format: 32MS/32WS/16MD/16WD/32XD	Score: 21–14, 21–14	
12 June	Peru Future Series: Host: Lima, Peru; Venue: Polideportivo Villa Deportiva, Club Regatas Lima; Level: Future Series; Format: 32MS/32WS/16MD/16WD/32XD	(Peru) Diego Mini (Peru) Paula la Torre	(Peru) José Guevara (Peru) Inés Castillo
12 June	Peru Future Series: Host: Lima, Peru; Venue: Polideportivo Villa Deportiva, Club Regatas Lima; Level: Future Series; Format: 32MS/32WS/16MD/16WD/32XD	Score: 21–17, 21–13	
19 June	Taipei Open (Draw): Host: Taipei, Taiwan; Venue: Tian-mu Arena, University of Taipei; Level: Super 300; Prize: $210,000; Format: 32MS/32WS/32MD/32WD/32XD	(Indonesia) Chico Aura Dwi Wardoyo	(Chinese Taipei) Su Li-yang
19 June	Taipei Open (Draw): Host: Taipei, Taiwan; Venue: Tian-mu Arena, University of Taipei; Level: Super 300; Prize: $210,000; Format: 32MS/32WS/32MD/32WD/32XD	Score: 23–21, 21–15	
19 June	Taipei Open (Draw): Host: Taipei, Taiwan; Venue: Tian-mu Arena, University of Taipei; Level: Super 300; Prize: $210,000; Format: 32MS/32WS/32MD/32WD/32XD	(Chinese Taipei) Tai Tzu-ying	(United States) Beiwen Zhang
19 June	Taipei Open (Draw): Host: Taipei, Taiwan; Venue: Tian-mu Arena, University of Taipei; Level: Super 300; Prize: $210,000; Format: 32MS/32WS/32MD/32WD/32XD	Score: 21–14, 21–17	
19 June	Taipei Open (Draw): Host: Taipei, Taiwan; Venue: Tian-mu Arena, University of Taipei; Level: Super 300; Prize: $210,000; Format: 32MS/32WS/32MD/32WD/32XD	(Malaysia) Man Wei Chong (Malaysia) Tee Kai Wun	(Chinese Taipei) Lu Ching-yao (Chinese Taipei) Yang Po-han
19 June	Taipei Open (Draw): Host: Taipei, Taiwan; Venue: Tian-mu Arena, University of Taipei; Level: Super 300; Prize: $210,000; Format: 32MS/32WS/32MD/32WD/32XD	Score: 20–22, 21–17, 21–14	
19 June	Taipei Open (Draw): Host: Taipei, Taiwan; Venue: Tian-mu Arena, University of Taipei; Level: Super 300; Prize: $210,000; Format: 32MS/32WS/32MD/32WD/32XD	(South Korea) Lee Yu-lim (South Korea) Shin Seung-chan	(Indonesia) Febriana Dwipuji Kusuma (Indonesia) Amalia Cahaya Pratiwi
19 June	Taipei Open (Draw): Host: Taipei, Taiwan; Venue: Tian-mu Arena, University of Taipei; Level: Super 300; Prize: $210,000; Format: 32MS/32WS/32MD/32WD/32XD	Score: 18–21, 21–17, 21–17	
19 June	Taipei Open (Draw): Host: Taipei, Taiwan; Venue: Tian-mu Arena, University of Taipei; Level: Super 300; Prize: $210,000; Format: 32MS/32WS/32MD/32WD/32XD	(Malaysia) Chen Tang Jie (Malaysia) Toh Ee Wei	(Chinese Taipei) Chiu Hsiang-chieh (Chinese Taipei) Lin Xiao-min
19 June	Taipei Open (Draw): Host: Taipei, Taiwan; Venue: Tian-mu Arena, University of Taipei; Level: Super 300; Prize: $210,000; Format: 32MS/32WS/32MD/32WD/32XD	Score: 21–12, 21–8	
19 June	China International: Host: Hangzhou, China; Venue: Binjiang Gymnasium; Level: International Challenge; Prize: $50,000; Format: 64MS/32WS/32MD/32WD/32XD	(China) Lei Lanxi	(China) Liu Liang
19 June	China International: Host: Hangzhou, China; Venue: Binjiang Gymnasium; Level: International Challenge; Prize: $50,000; Format: 64MS/32WS/32MD/32WD/32XD	Score: 21–7, 21–19	
19 June	China International: Host: Hangzhou, China; Venue: Binjiang Gymnasium; Level: International Challenge; Prize: $50,000; Format: 64MS/32WS/32MD/32WD/32XD	(China) Chen Lu	(China) Dai Wang
19 June	China International: Host: Hangzhou, China; Venue: Binjiang Gymnasium; Level: International Challenge; Prize: $50,000; Format: 64MS/32WS/32MD/32WD/32XD	Score: 21–12, 21–17	
19 June	China International: Host: Hangzhou, China; Venue: Binjiang Gymnasium; Level: International Challenge; Prize: $50,000; Format: 64MS/32WS/32MD/32WD/32XD	(China) Chen Xujun (China) Peng Jianqin	(Malaysia) Low Hang Yee (Malaysia) Ng Eng Cheong
19 June	China International: Host: Hangzhou, China; Venue: Binjiang Gymnasium; Level: International Challenge; Prize: $50,000; Format: 64MS/32WS/32MD/32WD/32XD	Score: 21–19, 19–21, 21–14	
19 June	China International: Host: Hangzhou, China; Venue: Binjiang Gymnasium; Level: International Challenge; Prize: $50,000; Format: 64MS/32WS/32MD/32WD/32XD	(China) Xia Yuting (China) Zhou Xinru	(China) Keng Shuliang (China) Zhang Chi
19 June	China International: Host: Hangzhou, China; Venue: Binjiang Gymnasium; Level: International Challenge; Prize: $50,000; Format: 64MS/32WS/32MD/32WD/32XD	Score: 21–15, 21–15	
19 June	China International: Host: Hangzhou, China; Venue: Binjiang Gymnasium; Level: International Challenge; Prize: $50,000; Format: 64MS/32WS/32MD/32WD/32XD	(China) Cheng Xing (China) Chen Fanghui	(China) Guo Xinwa (China) Li Qian
19 June	China International: Host: Hangzhou, China; Venue: Binjiang Gymnasium; Level: International Challenge; Prize: $50,000; Format: 64MS/32WS/32MD/32WD/32XD	Score: 21–19, 21–14	
19 June	Guatemala Future Series: Host: Guatemala City, Guatemala; Venue: Gimnasio Teodoro Palacios Flores; Level: Future Series; Format: 32MS/32WS/16MD/8WD/16XD	(Indonesia) Muhammad Sultan	(United States) Mark Alcala
19 June	Guatemala Future Series: Host: Guatemala City, Guatemala; Venue: Gimnasio Teodoro Palacios Flores; Level: Future Series; Format: 32MS/32WS/16MD/8WD/16XD	Score: 21–19, 21–9	
19 June	Guatemala Future Series: Host: Guatemala City, Guatemala; Venue: Gimnasio Teodoro Palacios Flores; Level: Future Series; Format: 32MS/32WS/16MD/8WD/16XD	(Japan) Tomoka Miyazaki	(Japan) Mei Sudo
19 June	Guatemala Future Series: Host: Guatemala City, Guatemala; Venue: Gimnasio Teodoro Palacios Flores; Level: Future Series; Format: 32MS/32WS/16MD/8WD/16XD	Score: 21–17, 19–21, 21–11	
19 June	Guatemala Future Series: Host: Guatemala City, Guatemala; Venue: Gimnasio Teodoro Palacios Flores; Level: Future Series; Format: 32MS/32WS/16MD/8WD/16XD	(Indonesia) Muhammad Halim As Sidiq (Indonesia) Muhammad Sultan	(Guatemala) José Granados (Guatemala) Antonio Ortíz
19 June	Guatemala Future Series: Host: Guatemala City, Guatemala; Venue: Gimnasio Teodoro Palacios Flores; Level: Future Series; Format: 32MS/32WS/16MD/8WD/16XD	Score: 21–15, 21–11	
19 June	Guatemala Future Series: Host: Guatemala City, Guatemala; Venue: Gimnasio Teodoro Palacios Flores; Level: Future Series; Format: 32MS/32WS/16MD/8WD/16XD	(Japan) Mei Sudo (Japan) Nao Yamakita	(Japan) Tomoka Miyazaki (Japan) Maya Taguchi
19 June	Guatemala Future Series: Host: Guatemala City, Guatemala; Venue: Gimnasio Teodoro Palacios Flores; Level: Future Series; Format: 32MS/32WS/16MD/8WD/16XD	Score: 16–21, 21–14, 25–23	
19 June	Guatemala Future Series: Host: Guatemala City, Guatemala; Venue: Gimnasio Teodoro Palacios Flores; Level: Future Series; Format: 32MS/32WS/16MD/8WD/16XD	(Japan) Daigo Tanioka (Japan) Maya Taguchi	(Japan) Kenta Matsukawa (Japan) Nao Yamakita
19 June	Guatemala Future Series: Host: Guatemala City, Guatemala; Venue: Gimnasio Teodoro Palacios Flores; Level: Future Series; Format: 32MS/32WS/16MD/8WD/16XD	Score: 21–18, 21–19	
26 June	European Games (Draw): Host: Tarnów, Poland; Venue: Hala Unii; Level: Continental Individual Championships; Format: 32MS/32WS/16MD/16WD/16XD	(Denmark) Viktor Axelsen	(France) Christo Popov
26 June	European Games (Draw): Host: Tarnów, Poland; Venue: Hala Unii; Level: Continental Individual Championships; Format: 32MS/32WS/16MD/16WD/16XD	Score: 16–21, 21–16, 21–11	
26 June	European Games (Draw): Host: Tarnów, Poland; Venue: Hala Unii; Level: Continental Individual Championships; Format: 32MS/32WS/16MD/16WD/16XD	(Spain) Carolina Marín	(Denmark) Mia Blichfeldt
26 June	European Games (Draw): Host: Tarnów, Poland; Venue: Hala Unii; Level: Continental Individual Championships; Format: 32MS/32WS/16MD/16WD/16XD	Score: 21–15, 21–14	
26 June	European Games (Draw): Host: Tarnów, Poland; Venue: Hala Unii; Level: Continental Individual Championships; Format: 32MS/32WS/16MD/16WD/16XD	(Denmark) Kim Astrup (Denmark) Anders Skaarup Rasmussen	(United Kingdom) Ben Lane (United Kingdom) Sean Vendy
26 June	European Games (Draw): Host: Tarnów, Poland; Venue: Hala Unii; Level: Continental Individual Championships; Format: 32MS/32WS/16MD/16WD/16XD	Score: 21–15, 19–21, 21–19	
26 June	European Games (Draw): Host: Tarnów, Poland; Venue: Hala Unii; Level: Continental Individual Championships; Format: 32MS/32WS/16MD/16WD/16XD	(Bulgaria) Gabriela Stoeva (Bulgaria) Stefani Stoeva	(Netherlands) Debora Jille (Netherlands) Cheryl Seinen
26 June	European Games (Draw): Host: Tarnów, Poland; Venue: Hala Unii; Level: Continental Individual Championships; Format: 32MS/32WS/16MD/16WD/16XD	Score: 21–7, 21–17	
26 June	European Games (Draw): Host: Tarnów, Poland; Venue: Hala Unii; Level: Continental Individual Championships; Format: 32MS/32WS/16MD/16WD/16XD	(Netherlands) Robin Tabeling (Netherlands) Selena Piek	(France) Thom Gicquel (France) Delphine Delrue
26 June	European Games (Draw): Host: Tarnów, Poland; Venue: Hala Unii; Level: Continental Individual Championships; Format: 32MS/32WS/16MD/16WD/16XD	Score: 21–10, 13–21, 21–13	
26 June	Mongolia International: Host: Ulaanbaatar, Mongolia; Venue: Galkhuu Zulbaatar; Level: International Challenge; Prize: $15,000; Format: 64MS/32WS/32MD/32WD/32XD	(Hong Kong) Chan Yin Chak	(Israel) Daniil Dubovenko
26 June	Mongolia International: Host: Ulaanbaatar, Mongolia; Venue: Galkhuu Zulbaatar; Level: International Challenge; Prize: $15,000; Format: 64MS/32WS/32MD/32WD/32XD	Score: 21–19, 21–11	
26 June	Mongolia International: Host: Ulaanbaatar, Mongolia; Venue: Galkhuu Zulbaatar; Level: International Challenge; Prize: $15,000; Format: 64MS/32WS/32MD/32WD/32XD	(Japan) Akari Kurihara	(United States) Lauren Lam
26 June	Mongolia International: Host: Ulaanbaatar, Mongolia; Venue: Galkhuu Zulbaatar; Level: International Challenge; Prize: $15,000; Format: 64MS/32WS/32MD/32WD/32XD	Score: 21–19, 21–13	
26 June	Mongolia International: Host: Ulaanbaatar, Mongolia; Venue: Galkhuu Zulbaatar; Level: International Challenge; Prize: $15,000; Format: 64MS/32WS/32MD/32WD/32XD	(Malaysia) Low Hang Yee (Malaysia) Ng Eng Cheong	(Malaysia) Chia Wei Jie (Malaysia) Liew Xun
26 June	Mongolia International: Host: Ulaanbaatar, Mongolia; Venue: Galkhuu Zulbaatar; Level: International Challenge; Prize: $15,000; Format: 64MS/32WS/32MD/32WD/32XD	Score: 21–17, 21–15	
26 June	Mongolia International: Host: Ulaanbaatar, Mongolia; Venue: Galkhuu Zulbaatar; Level: International Challenge; Prize: $15,000; Format: 64MS/32WS/32MD/32WD/32XD	(Hong Kong) Lui Lok Lok (Hong Kong) Ng Wing Yung	(Australia) Setyana Mapasa (Australia) Angela Yu
26 June	Mongolia International: Host: Ulaanbaatar, Mongolia; Venue: Galkhuu Zulbaatar; Level: International Challenge; Prize: $15,000; Format: 64MS/32WS/32MD/32WD/32XD	Score: 21–16, 21–18	
26 June	Mongolia International: Host: Ulaanbaatar, Mongolia; Venue: Galkhuu Zulbaatar; Level: International Challenge; Prize: $15,000; Format: 64MS/32WS/32MD/32WD/32XD	(Australia) Kenneth Choo (Australia) Gronya Somerville	(Thailand) Tanakorn Meechai (Thailand) Fungfa Korpthammakit
26 June	Mongolia International: Host: Ulaanbaatar, Mongolia; Venue: Galkhuu Zulbaatar; Level: International Challenge; Prize: $15,000; Format: 64MS/32WS/32MD/32WD/32XD	Score: 22–20, 21–17	

=== July ===
Week commencing	Tournament	Champions	Runners-up
3 July	Canada Open (Draw): Host: Calgary, Canada; Venue: Markin MacPhail Centre; Level: Super 500; Prize: $420,000; Format: 48MS/32WS/32MD/32WD/32XD	(India) Lakshya Sen	(China) Li Shifeng
3 July	Canada Open (Draw): Host: Calgary, Canada; Venue: Markin MacPhail Centre; Level: Super 500; Prize: $420,000; Format: 48MS/32WS/32MD/32WD/32XD	Score: 21–18, 22–20	
3 July	Canada Open (Draw): Host: Calgary, Canada; Venue: Markin MacPhail Centre; Level: Super 500; Prize: $420,000; Format: 48MS/32WS/32MD/32WD/32XD	(Japan) Akane Yamaguchi	(Thailand) Ratchanok Intanon
3 July	Canada Open (Draw): Host: Calgary, Canada; Venue: Markin MacPhail Centre; Level: Super 500; Prize: $420,000; Format: 48MS/32WS/32MD/32WD/32XD	Score: 21–19, 21–16	
3 July	Canada Open (Draw): Host: Calgary, Canada; Venue: Markin MacPhail Centre; Level: Super 500; Prize: $420,000; Format: 48MS/32WS/32MD/32WD/32XD	(Denmark) Kim Astrup (Denmark) Anders Skaarup Rasmussen	(Denmark) Rasmus Kjær (Denmark) Frederik Søgaard
3 July	Canada Open (Draw): Host: Calgary, Canada; Venue: Markin MacPhail Centre; Level: Super 500; Prize: $420,000; Format: 48MS/32WS/32MD/32WD/32XD	Score: 23–25, 21–16, 21–12	
3 July	Canada Open (Draw): Host: Calgary, Canada; Venue: Markin MacPhail Centre; Level: Super 500; Prize: $420,000; Format: 48MS/32WS/32MD/32WD/32XD	(Japan) Nami Matsuyama (Japan) Chiharu Shida	(Japan) Mayu Matsumoto (Japan) Wakana Nagahara
3 July	Canada Open (Draw): Host: Calgary, Canada; Venue: Markin MacPhail Centre; Level: Super 500; Prize: $420,000; Format: 48MS/32WS/32MD/32WD/32XD	Score: 22–20. 21–16	
3 July	Canada Open (Draw): Host: Calgary, Canada; Venue: Markin MacPhail Centre; Level: Super 500; Prize: $420,000; Format: 48MS/32WS/32MD/32WD/32XD	(Japan) Hiroki Midorikawa (Japan) Natsu Saito	(Denmark) Mathias Thyrri (Denmark) Amalie Magelund
3 July	Canada Open (Draw): Host: Calgary, Canada; Venue: Markin MacPhail Centre; Level: Super 500; Prize: $420,000; Format: 48MS/32WS/32MD/32WD/32XD	Score: 21–17, 16–21, 21–13	
3 July	Future Series Nouvelle-Aquitaine: Host: Pessac, France; Venue: Grand Complexe Sportif de Bellegrave; Level: Future Series; Format: 32MS/32WS/32MD/8WD/32XD	(India) Bharat Raghav	(Netherlands) Noah Haase
3 July	Future Series Nouvelle-Aquitaine: Host: Pessac, France; Venue: Grand Complexe Sportif de Bellegrave; Level: Future Series; Format: 32MS/32WS/32MD/8WD/32XD	Score: 18–21, 21–13, 21–8	
3 July	Future Series Nouvelle-Aquitaine: Host: Pessac, France; Venue: Grand Complexe Sportif de Bellegrave; Level: Future Series; Format: 32MS/32WS/32MD/8WD/32XD	(Chinese Taipei) Tung Ciou-tong	(Bulgaria) Kaloyana Nalbantova
3 July	Future Series Nouvelle-Aquitaine: Host: Pessac, France; Venue: Grand Complexe Sportif de Bellegrave; Level: Future Series; Format: 32MS/32WS/32MD/8WD/32XD	Score: 21–17, 17–21, 21–11	
3 July	Future Series Nouvelle-Aquitaine: Host: Pessac, France; Venue: Grand Complexe Sportif de Bellegrave; Level: Future Series; Format: 32MS/32WS/32MD/8WD/32XD	(France) Éloi Adam (France) Léo Rossi	(France) Louis Ducrot (France) Quentin Ronget
3 July	Future Series Nouvelle-Aquitaine: Host: Pessac, France; Venue: Grand Complexe Sportif de Bellegrave; Level: Future Series; Format: 32MS/32WS/32MD/8WD/32XD	Score: 21–16, 21–13	
3 July	Future Series Nouvelle-Aquitaine: Host: Pessac, France; Venue: Grand Complexe Sportif de Bellegrave; Level: Future Series; Format: 32MS/32WS/32MD/8WD/32XD	(Turkey) Bengisu Erçetin (Turkey) Nazlıcan İnci	(France) Sharone Bauer (France) Emilie Vercelot
3 July	Future Series Nouvelle-Aquitaine: Host: Pessac, France; Venue: Grand Complexe Sportif de Bellegrave; Level: Future Series; Format: 32MS/32WS/32MD/8WD/32XD	Score: 21–16, 21–9	
3 July	Future Series Nouvelle-Aquitaine: Host: Pessac, France; Venue: Grand Complexe Sportif de Bellegrave; Level: Future Series; Format: 32MS/32WS/32MD/8WD/32XD	(France) Éloi Adam (France) Sharone Bauer	(Netherlands) Dyon van Wijlick (Netherlands) Jaymie Laurens
3 July	Future Series Nouvelle-Aquitaine: Host: Pessac, France; Venue: Grand Complexe Sportif de Bellegrave; Level: Future Series; Format: 32MS/32WS/32MD/8WD/32XD	Score: 21–12, 12–21, 21–15	
10 July	U.S. Open (Draw): Host: Council Bluffs, United States; Venue: Mid-America Center; Level: Super 300; Prize: $210,000; Format: 32MS/32WS/32MD/32WD/32XD	(China) Li Shifeng	(Thailand) Kunlavut Vitidsarn
10 July	U.S. Open (Draw): Host: Council Bluffs, United States; Venue: Mid-America Center; Level: Super 300; Prize: $210,000; Format: 32MS/32WS/32MD/32WD/32XD	Score: 21–15, 21–18	
10 July	U.S. Open (Draw): Host: Council Bluffs, United States; Venue: Mid-America Center; Level: Super 300; Prize: $210,000; Format: 32MS/32WS/32MD/32WD/32XD	(Thailand) Supanida Katethong	(China) Gao Fangjie
10 July	U.S. Open (Draw): Host: Council Bluffs, United States; Venue: Mid-America Center; Level: Super 300; Prize: $210,000; Format: 32MS/32WS/32MD/32WD/32XD	Score: 21–15, 21–16	
10 July	U.S. Open (Draw): Host: Council Bluffs, United States; Venue: Mid-America Center; Level: Super 300; Prize: $210,000; Format: 32MS/32WS/32MD/32WD/32XD	(Malaysia) Goh Sze Fei (Malaysia) Nur Izzuddin	(Chinese Taipei) Lee Fang-chih (Chinese Taipei) Lee Fang-jen
10 July	U.S. Open (Draw): Host: Council Bluffs, United States; Venue: Mid-America Center; Level: Super 300; Prize: $210,000; Format: 32MS/32WS/32MD/32WD/32XD	Score: 21–9, 21–10	
10 July	U.S. Open (Draw): Host: Council Bluffs, United States; Venue: Mid-America Center; Level: Super 300; Prize: $210,000; Format: 32MS/32WS/32MD/32WD/32XD	(China) Liu Shengshu (China) Tan Ning	(Denmark) Maiken Fruergaard (Denmark) Sara Thygesen
10 July	U.S. Open (Draw): Host: Council Bluffs, United States; Venue: Mid-America Center; Level: Super 300; Prize: $210,000; Format: 32MS/32WS/32MD/32WD/32XD	Score: 21–19, 21–19	
10 July	U.S. Open (Draw): Host: Council Bluffs, United States; Venue: Mid-America Center; Level: Super 300; Prize: $210,000; Format: 32MS/32WS/32MD/32WD/32XD	(Chinese Taipei) Ye Hong-wei (Chinese Taipei) Lee Chia-hsin	(Denmark) Mathias Thyrri (Denmark) Amalie Magelund
10 July	U.S. Open (Draw): Host: Council Bluffs, United States; Venue: Mid-America Center; Level: Super 300; Prize: $210,000; Format: 32MS/32WS/32MD/32WD/32XD	Score: 13–21, 21–6, 21–18	
17 July	Korea Open (Draw): Host: Yeosu, South Korea; Venue: Jinnam Stadium; Level: Super 500; Prize: $420,000; Format: 32MS/32WS/32MD/32WD/32XD	(Denmark) Anders Antonsen	(Singapore) Loh Kean Yew
17 July	Korea Open (Draw): Host: Yeosu, South Korea; Venue: Jinnam Stadium; Level: Super 500; Prize: $420,000; Format: 32MS/32WS/32MD/32WD/32XD	Score: 11–21, 21–11, 21–19	
17 July	Korea Open (Draw): Host: Yeosu, South Korea; Venue: Jinnam Stadium; Level: Super 500; Prize: $420,000; Format: 32MS/32WS/32MD/32WD/32XD	(South Korea) An Se-young	(Chinese Taipei) Tai Tzu-ying
17 July	Korea Open (Draw): Host: Yeosu, South Korea; Venue: Jinnam Stadium; Level: Super 500; Prize: $420,000; Format: 32MS/32WS/32MD/32WD/32XD	Score: 21–9, 21–15	
17 July	Korea Open (Draw): Host: Yeosu, South Korea; Venue: Jinnam Stadium; Level: Super 500; Prize: $420,000; Format: 32MS/32WS/32MD/32WD/32XD	(India) Satwiksairaj Rankireddy (India) Chirag Shetty	(Indonesia) Fajar Alfian (Indonesia) Muhammad Rian Ardianto
17 July	Korea Open (Draw): Host: Yeosu, South Korea; Venue: Jinnam Stadium; Level: Super 500; Prize: $420,000; Format: 32MS/32WS/32MD/32WD/32XD	Score: 17–21, 21–13, 21–14	
17 July	Korea Open (Draw): Host: Yeosu, South Korea; Venue: Jinnam Stadium; Level: Super 500; Prize: $420,000; Format: 32MS/32WS/32MD/32WD/32XD	(China) Chen Qingchen (China) Jia Yifan	(South Korea) Kim So-yeong (South Korea) Kong Hee-yong
17 July	Korea Open (Draw): Host: Yeosu, South Korea; Venue: Jinnam Stadium; Level: Super 500; Prize: $420,000; Format: 32MS/32WS/32MD/32WD/32XD	Score: 21–10, 17–21, 21–7	
17 July	Korea Open (Draw): Host: Yeosu, South Korea; Venue: Jinnam Stadium; Level: Super 500; Prize: $420,000; Format: 32MS/32WS/32MD/32WD/32XD	(China) Feng Yanzhe (China) Huang Dongping	(China) Jiang Zhenbang (China) Wei Yaxin
17 July	Korea Open (Draw): Host: Yeosu, South Korea; Venue: Jinnam Stadium; Level: Super 500; Prize: $420,000; Format: 32MS/32WS/32MD/32WD/32XD	Score: 21–16, 21–13	
17 July	Mauritius International: Host: Rose Hill, Mauritius; Venue: National Badminton Center; Level: International Series; Prize: $5,000; Format: 32MS/32WS/32MD/16WD/32XD	(India) Kartikey Gulshan Kumar	(Japan) Shogo Ogawa
17 July	Mauritius International: Host: Rose Hill, Mauritius; Venue: National Badminton Center; Level: International Series; Prize: $5,000; Format: 32MS/32WS/32MD/16WD/32XD	Score: 21–18, 21–17	
17 July	Mauritius International: Host: Rose Hill, Mauritius; Venue: National Badminton Center; Level: International Series; Prize: $5,000; Format: 32MS/32WS/32MD/16WD/32XD	(Japan) Hina Akechi	(India) Aditi Bhatt
17 July	Mauritius International: Host: Rose Hill, Mauritius; Venue: National Badminton Center; Level: International Series; Prize: $5,000; Format: 32MS/32WS/32MD/16WD/32XD	Score: 21–13, 21–17	
17 July	Mauritius International: Host: Rose Hill, Mauritius; Venue: National Badminton Center; Level: International Series; Prize: $5,000; Format: 32MS/32WS/32MD/16WD/32XD	(Japan) Shogo Ogawa (Japan) Daisuke Sano	(India) Hariharan Amsakarunan (India) Ruban Kumar
17 July	Mauritius International: Host: Rose Hill, Mauritius; Venue: National Badminton Center; Level: International Series; Prize: $5,000; Format: 32MS/32WS/32MD/16WD/32XD	Score: 21–17, 21–16	
17 July	Mauritius International: Host: Rose Hill, Mauritius; Venue: National Badminton Center; Level: International Series; Prize: $5,000; Format: 32MS/32WS/32MD/16WD/32XD	(Japan) Natsumi Takasaki (Japan) Mai Tanabe	(United States) Srivedya Gurazada (United States) Ishika Jaiswal
17 July	Mauritius International: Host: Rose Hill, Mauritius; Venue: National Badminton Center; Level: International Series; Prize: $5,000; Format: 32MS/32WS/32MD/16WD/32XD	Score: 21–4, 21–14	
17 July	Mauritius International: Host: Rose Hill, Mauritius; Venue: National Badminton Center; Level: International Series; Prize: $5,000; Format: 32MS/32WS/32MD/16WD/32XD	(India) Hariharan Amsakarunan (India) Varshini Viswanath Sri	(Algeria) Koceila Mammeri (Algeria) Tanina Mammeri
17 July	Mauritius International: Host: Rose Hill, Mauritius; Venue: National Badminton Center; Level: International Series; Prize: $5,000; Format: 32MS/32WS/32MD/16WD/32XD	Score: 21–16, 21–17	
24 July	World University Games (Draw): Host: Chengdu, China; Venue: Shuangliu Sports Centre Gymnasium; Level: Multi-Sport Games; Format: 17 teams	Chinese Taipei	China
24 July	World University Games (Draw): Host: Chengdu, China; Venue: Shuangliu Sports Centre Gymnasium; Level: Multi-Sport Games; Format: 17 teams	Ye Hong-wei; Lee Chia-hsin	He Jiting; Du Yue
24 July	World University Games (Draw): Host: Chengdu, China; Venue: Shuangliu Sports Centre Gymnasium; Level: Multi-Sport Games; Format: 17 teams	Lin Chun-yi	Wang Zhengxing
24 July	World University Games (Draw): Host: Chengdu, China; Venue: Shuangliu Sports Centre Gymnasium; Level: Multi-Sport Games; Format: 17 teams	Hsu Wen-chi	Han Yue
24 July	World University Games (Draw): Host: Chengdu, China; Venue: Shuangliu Sports Centre Gymnasium; Level: Multi-Sport Games; Format: 17 teams	Lee Fang-chih; Ye Hong-wei	Ren Xiangyu; Tan Qiang
24 July	World University Games (Draw): Host: Chengdu, China; Venue: Shuangliu Sports Centre Gymnasium; Level: Multi-Sport Games; Format: 17 teams	Lee Chia-hsin; Teng Chun-hsun	Li Wenmei; Liu Xuanxuan
24 July	World University Games (Draw): Host: Chengdu, China; Venue: Shuangliu Sports Centre Gymnasium; Level: Multi-Sport Games; Format: 17 teams	Score: 3–2	
24 July	Japan Open (Draw): Host: Tokyo, Japan; Venue: Yoyogi National Gymnasium; Level: Super 750; Prize: $850,000; Format: 32MS/32WS/32MD/32WD/32XD	(Denmark) Viktor Axelsen	(Indonesia) Jonatan Christie
24 July	Japan Open (Draw): Host: Tokyo, Japan; Venue: Yoyogi National Gymnasium; Level: Super 750; Prize: $850,000; Format: 32MS/32WS/32MD/32WD/32XD	Score: 21–7, 21–18	
24 July	Japan Open (Draw): Host: Tokyo, Japan; Venue: Yoyogi National Gymnasium; Level: Super 750; Prize: $850,000; Format: 32MS/32WS/32MD/32WD/32XD	(South Korea) An Se-young	(China) He Bingjiao
24 July	Japan Open (Draw): Host: Tokyo, Japan; Venue: Yoyogi National Gymnasium; Level: Super 750; Prize: $850,000; Format: 32MS/32WS/32MD/32WD/32XD	Score: 21–15, 21–11	
24 July	Japan Open (Draw): Host: Tokyo, Japan; Venue: Yoyogi National Gymnasium; Level: Super 750; Prize: $850,000; Format: 32MS/32WS/32MD/32WD/32XD	(Chinese Taipei) Lee Yang (Chinese Taipei) Wang Chi-lin	(Japan) Takuro Hoki (Japan) Yugo Kobayashi
24 July	Japan Open (Draw): Host: Tokyo, Japan; Venue: Yoyogi National Gymnasium; Level: Super 750; Prize: $850,000; Format: 32MS/32WS/32MD/32WD/32XD	Score: 21–19, 21–13	
24 July	Japan Open (Draw): Host: Tokyo, Japan; Venue: Yoyogi National Gymnasium; Level: Super 750; Prize: $850,000; Format: 32MS/32WS/32MD/32WD/32XD	(South Korea) Kim So-yeong (South Korea) Kong Hee-yong	(China) Chen Qingchen (China) Jia Yifan
24 July	Japan Open (Draw): Host: Tokyo, Japan; Venue: Yoyogi National Gymnasium; Level: Super 750; Prize: $850,000; Format: 32MS/32WS/32MD/32WD/32XD	Score: 21–17, 21–14	
24 July	Japan Open (Draw): Host: Tokyo, Japan; Venue: Yoyogi National Gymnasium; Level: Super 750; Prize: $850,000; Format: 32MS/32WS/32MD/32WD/32XD	(Japan) Yuta Watanabe (Japan) Arisa Higashino	(Thailand) Dechapol Puavaranukroh (Thailand) Sapsiree Taerattanachai
24 July	Japan Open (Draw): Host: Tokyo, Japan; Venue: Yoyogi National Gymnasium; Level: Super 750; Prize: $850,000; Format: 32MS/32WS/32MD/32WD/32XD	Score: 17–21, 21–16, 21–15	
24 July	Réunion Open: Host: Saint-Denis, Réunion; Venue: Gymnase de Champ-Fleuri; Level: International Challenge; Prize: $25,000; Format: 32MS/32WS/32MD/32WD/32XD	(France) Arnaud Merklé	(Chinese Taipei) Huang Yu-kai
24 July	Réunion Open: Host: Saint-Denis, Réunion; Venue: Gymnase de Champ-Fleuri; Level: International Challenge; Prize: $25,000; Format: 32MS/32WS/32MD/32WD/32XD	Score: 21–19, 21–19	
24 July	Réunion Open: Host: Saint-Denis, Réunion; Venue: Gymnase de Champ-Fleuri; Level: International Challenge; Prize: $25,000; Format: 32MS/32WS/32MD/32WD/32XD	(Japan) Hina Akechi	(Japan) Kaoru Sugiyama
24 July	Réunion Open: Host: Saint-Denis, Réunion; Venue: Gymnase de Champ-Fleuri; Level: International Challenge; Prize: $25,000; Format: 32MS/32WS/32MD/32WD/32XD	Score: 22–20, 21–10	
24 July	Réunion Open: Host: Saint-Denis, Réunion; Venue: Gymnase de Champ-Fleuri; Level: International Challenge; Prize: $25,000; Format: 32MS/32WS/32MD/32WD/32XD	(India) Krishna Prasad Garaga (India) Vishnuvardhan Goud Panjala	(Germany) Matthias Kicklitz (Germany) Max Weißkirchen
24 July	Réunion Open: Host: Saint-Denis, Réunion; Venue: Gymnase de Champ-Fleuri; Level: International Challenge; Prize: $25,000; Format: 32MS/32WS/32MD/32WD/32XD	Score: 21–18, 21–12	
24 July	Réunion Open: Host: Saint-Denis, Réunion; Venue: Gymnase de Champ-Fleuri; Level: International Challenge; Prize: $25,000; Format: 32MS/32WS/32MD/32WD/32XD	(France) Margot Lambert (France) Anne Tran	(Japan) Natsumi Takasaki (Japan) Mai Tanabe
24 July	Réunion Open: Host: Saint-Denis, Réunion; Venue: Gymnase de Champ-Fleuri; Level: International Challenge; Prize: $25,000; Format: 32MS/32WS/32MD/32WD/32XD	Score: 14–21, 21–14, 21–10	
24 July	Réunion Open: Host: Saint-Denis, Réunion; Venue: Gymnase de Champ-Fleuri; Level: International Challenge; Prize: $25,000; Format: 32MS/32WS/32MD/32WD/32XD	(Algeria) Koceila Mammeri (Algeria) Tanina Mammeri	(India) Hariharan Amsakarunan (India) Varshini Viswanath Sri
24 July	Réunion Open: Host: Saint-Denis, Réunion; Venue: Gymnase de Champ-Fleuri; Level: International Challenge; Prize: $25,000; Format: 32MS/32WS/32MD/32WD/32XD	Score: 21–19, 21–14	
31 July	World University Games (Draw): Host: Chengdu, China; Venue: Shuangliu Sports Centre Gymnasium; Level: Multi-Sport Games; Format: 32MS/32WS/16MD/16WD/16XD	(China) Wang Zhengxing	(Thailand) Panitchaphon Teeraratsakul
31 July	World University Games (Draw): Host: Chengdu, China; Venue: Shuangliu Sports Centre Gymnasium; Level: Multi-Sport Games; Format: 32MS/32WS/16MD/16WD/16XD	Score: 21–16, 21–14	
31 July	World University Games (Draw): Host: Chengdu, China; Venue: Shuangliu Sports Centre Gymnasium; Level: Multi-Sport Games; Format: 32MS/32WS/16MD/16WD/16XD	(China) Han Yue	(South Korea) Kim Ga-ram
31 July	World University Games (Draw): Host: Chengdu, China; Venue: Shuangliu Sports Centre Gymnasium; Level: Multi-Sport Games; Format: 32MS/32WS/16MD/16WD/16XD	Score: 21–9, 21–13	
31 July	World University Games (Draw): Host: Chengdu, China; Venue: Shuangliu Sports Centre Gymnasium; Level: Multi-Sport Games; Format: 32MS/32WS/16MD/16WD/16XD	(China) Ren Xiangyu (China) Tan Qiang	(China) He Jiting (China) Zhou Haodong
31 July	World University Games (Draw): Host: Chengdu, China; Venue: Shuangliu Sports Centre Gymnasium; Level: Multi-Sport Games; Format: 32MS/32WS/16MD/16WD/16XD	Score: 23–21, 21–16	
31 July	World University Games (Draw): Host: Chengdu, China; Venue: Shuangliu Sports Centre Gymnasium; Level: Multi-Sport Games; Format: 32MS/32WS/16MD/16WD/16XD	(China) Li Wenmei (China) Liu Xuanxuan	(China) Du Yue (China) Xia Yuting
31 July	World University Games (Draw): Host: Chengdu, China; Venue: Shuangliu Sports Centre Gymnasium; Level: Multi-Sport Games; Format: 32MS/32WS/16MD/16WD/16XD	Score: 18–21, 21–19, 21–14	
31 July	World University Games (Draw): Host: Chengdu, China; Venue: Shuangliu Sports Centre Gymnasium; Level: Multi-Sport Games; Format: 32MS/32WS/16MD/16WD/16XD	(Chinese Taipei) Ye Hong-wei (Chinese Taipei) Lee Chia-hsin	(Chinese Taipei) Lee Fang-chih (Chinese Taipei) Teng Chun-hsun
31 July	World University Games (Draw): Host: Chengdu, China; Venue: Shuangliu Sports Centre Gymnasium; Level: Multi-Sport Games; Format: 32MS/32WS/16MD/16WD/16XD	Score: 21–15, 21–17	
31 July	Australian Open (Draw): Host: Sydney, Australia; Venue: State Sports Centre; Level: Super 500; Prize: $420,000; Format: 32MS/32WS/32MD/32WD/32XD	(China) Weng Hongyang	(India) Prannoy H. S.
31 July	Australian Open (Draw): Host: Sydney, Australia; Venue: State Sports Centre; Level: Super 500; Prize: $420,000; Format: 32MS/32WS/32MD/32WD/32XD	Score: 21–9, 21–23, 22–20	
31 July	Australian Open (Draw): Host: Sydney, Australia; Venue: State Sports Centre; Level: Super 500; Prize: $420,000; Format: 32MS/32WS/32MD/32WD/32XD	(United States) Beiwen Zhang	(South Korea) Kim Ga-eun
31 July	Australian Open (Draw): Host: Sydney, Australia; Venue: State Sports Centre; Level: Super 500; Prize: $420,000; Format: 32MS/32WS/32MD/32WD/32XD	Score: 20–22, 21–16, 21–8	
31 July	Australian Open (Draw): Host: Sydney, Australia; Venue: State Sports Centre; Level: Super 500; Prize: $420,000; Format: 32MS/32WS/32MD/32WD/32XD	(South Korea) Seo Seung-jae (South Korea) Kang Min-hyuk	(Japan) Takuro Hoki (Japan) Yugo Kobayashi
31 July	Australian Open (Draw): Host: Sydney, Australia; Venue: State Sports Centre; Level: Super 500; Prize: $420,000; Format: 32MS/32WS/32MD/32WD/32XD	Score: 21–17, 21–17	
31 July	Australian Open (Draw): Host: Sydney, Australia; Venue: State Sports Centre; Level: Super 500; Prize: $420,000; Format: 32MS/32WS/32MD/32WD/32XD	(South Korea) Kim So-yeong (South Korea) Kong Hee-yong	(China) Liu Shengshu (China) Tan Ning
31 July	Australian Open (Draw): Host: Sydney, Australia; Venue: State Sports Centre; Level: Super 500; Prize: $420,000; Format: 32MS/32WS/32MD/32WD/32XD	Score: 21–18, 21–16	
31 July	Australian Open (Draw): Host: Sydney, Australia; Venue: State Sports Centre; Level: Super 500; Prize: $420,000; Format: 32MS/32WS/32MD/32WD/32XD	(China) Feng Yanzhe (China) Huang Dongping	(Japan) Hiroki Midorikawa (Japan) Natsu Saito
31 July	Australian Open (Draw): Host: Sydney, Australia; Venue: State Sports Centre; Level: Super 500; Prize: $420,000; Format: 32MS/32WS/32MD/32WD/32XD	Score: 21–14, 16–21, 21–15	
31 July	Argentina Future Series (cancelled) (Note: This tournament, originally to be played on 2–6 August, was later cancelled.): Host: Buenos Aires, Argentina; Venue: TBC; Level: Future Series; Format: 32MS/32WS/32MD/8WD/32XD		
31 July	Argentina Future Series (cancelled): Host: Buenos Aires, Argentina; Venue: TBC; Level: Future Series; Format: 32MS/32WS/32MD/8WD/32XD	Score:	
31 July	Argentina Future Series (cancelled): Host: Buenos Aires, Argentina; Venue: TBC; Level: Future Series; Format: 32MS/32WS/32MD/8WD/32XD	Score:	
31 July	Argentina Future Series (cancelled): Host: Buenos Aires, Argentina; Venue: TBC; Level: Future Series; Format: 32MS/32WS/32MD/8WD/32XD	Score:	
31 July	Argentina Future Series (cancelled): Host: Buenos Aires, Argentina; Venue: TBC; Level: Future Series; Format: 32MS/32WS/32MD/8WD/32XD	Score:	
31 July	Argentina Future Series (cancelled): Host: Buenos Aires, Argentina; Venue: TBC; Level: Future Series; Format: 32MS/32WS/32MD/8WD/32XD	Score:	

=== August ===
Week commencing	Tournament	Champions	Runners-up
7 August	New Zealand Open (Draw) (cancelled) (Note: This tournament, originally to be played on 8–13 August, was later cancelled because Badminton New Zealand has relinquished its hosting rights of the HSBC BWF World Tour Super 300 New Zealand Open for the next four years.): Host: Auckland, New Zealand; Venue: Eventfinda Stadium; Level: Super 300; Prize: $210,000; Format: 32MS/32WS/32MD/32WD/32XD		
7 August	New Zealand Open (Draw) (cancelled): Host: Auckland, New Zealand; Venue: Eventfinda Stadium; Level: Super 300; Prize: $210,000; Format: 32MS/32WS/32MD/32WD/32XD	Score:	
7 August	New Zealand Open (Draw) (cancelled): Host: Auckland, New Zealand; Venue: Eventfinda Stadium; Level: Super 300; Prize: $210,000; Format: 32MS/32WS/32MD/32WD/32XD	Score:	
7 August	New Zealand Open (Draw) (cancelled): Host: Auckland, New Zealand; Venue: Eventfinda Stadium; Level: Super 300; Prize: $210,000; Format: 32MS/32WS/32MD/32WD/32XD	Score:	
7 August	New Zealand Open (Draw) (cancelled): Host: Auckland, New Zealand; Venue: Eventfinda Stadium; Level: Super 300; Prize: $210,000; Format: 32MS/32WS/32MD/32WD/32XD	Score:	
7 August	New Zealand Open (Draw) (cancelled): Host: Auckland, New Zealand; Venue: Eventfinda Stadium; Level: Super 300; Prize: $210,000; Format: 32MS/32WS/32MD/32WD/32XD	Score:	
7 August	Tajikistan International: Host: Dushanbe, Tajikistan; Venue: Dushanbe Tennis & Water Sport Complex; Level: International Series; Prize: $5,000; Format: 64MS/32WS/8MD/8WD/8XD	(Vietnam) Lê Đức Phát	(Israel) Daniil Dubovenko
7 August	Tajikistan International: Host: Dushanbe, Tajikistan; Venue: Dushanbe Tennis & Water Sport Complex; Level: International Series; Prize: $5,000; Format: 64MS/32WS/8MD/8WD/8XD	Score: 21–16, 24–22	
7 August	Tajikistan International: Host: Dushanbe, Tajikistan; Venue: Dushanbe Tennis & Water Sport Complex; Level: International Series; Prize: $5,000; Format: 64MS/32WS/8MD/8WD/8XD	(India) Anupama Upadhyaya	(Israel) Ksenia Polikarpova
7 August	Tajikistan International: Host: Dushanbe, Tajikistan; Venue: Dushanbe Tennis & Water Sport Complex; Level: International Series; Prize: $5,000; Format: 64MS/32WS/8MD/8WD/8XD	Score: 19–21, 21–9, 21–8	
7 August	Tajikistan International: Host: Dushanbe, Tajikistan; Venue: Dushanbe Tennis & Water Sport Complex; Level: International Series; Prize: $5,000; Format: 64MS/32WS/8MD/8WD/8XD	(Kazakhstan) Khaitmurat Kulmatov (Kazakhstan) Makhsut Tadzhibullaev	(Uzbekistan) Gafforbek Jabborov (Uzbekistan) Biloliddin Kuchkarboev
7 August	Tajikistan International: Host: Dushanbe, Tajikistan; Venue: Dushanbe Tennis & Water Sport Complex; Level: International Series; Prize: $5,000; Format: 64MS/32WS/8MD/8WD/8XD	Score: 21–19, 18–21, 21–12	
7 August	Tajikistan International: Host: Dushanbe, Tajikistan; Venue: Dushanbe Tennis & Water Sport Complex; Level: International Series; Prize: $5,000; Format: 64MS/32WS/8MD/8WD/8XD	(India) Rutaparna Panda (India) Swetaparna Panda	(Azerbaijan) Era Maftuha (Azerbaijan) Hajar Nuriyeva
7 August	Tajikistan International: Host: Dushanbe, Tajikistan; Venue: Dushanbe Tennis & Water Sport Complex; Level: International Series; Prize: $5,000; Format: 64MS/32WS/8MD/8WD/8XD	Score: 21–3, 21–7	
7 August	Tajikistan International: Host: Dushanbe, Tajikistan; Venue: Dushanbe Tennis & Water Sport Complex; Level: International Series; Prize: $5,000; Format: 64MS/32WS/8MD/8WD/8XD	(Kazakhstan) Dmitriy Panarin (Kazakhstan) Kamila Smagulova	(Kazakhstan) Khaitmurat Kulmatov (Kazakhstan) Romualda Batyrova
7 August	Tajikistan International: Host: Dushanbe, Tajikistan; Venue: Dushanbe Tennis & Water Sport Complex; Level: International Series; Prize: $5,000; Format: 64MS/32WS/8MD/8WD/8XD	Score: 21–8, 21–13	
7 August	Brazil International: Host: Foz do Iguaçu, Paraná, Brazil; Venue: Ginásio de Esportes Costa Cavalcanti; Level: International Series; Prize: $5,000; Format: 32MS/32WS/32MD/16WD/32XD	(Guatemala) Kevin Cordón	(Brazil) Ygor Coelho
7 August	Brazil International: Host: Foz do Iguaçu, Paraná, Brazil; Venue: Ginásio de Esportes Costa Cavalcanti; Level: International Series; Prize: $5,000; Format: 32MS/32WS/32MD/16WD/32XD	Score: 22–20, 14–21, 21–16	
7 August	Brazil International: Host: Foz do Iguaçu, Paraná, Brazil; Venue: Ginásio de Esportes Costa Cavalcanti; Level: International Series; Prize: $5,000; Format: 32MS/32WS/32MD/16WD/32XD	(Mauritius) Kate Ludik	(Italy) Yasmine Hamza
7 August	Brazil International: Host: Foz do Iguaçu, Paraná, Brazil; Venue: Ginásio de Esportes Costa Cavalcanti; Level: International Series; Prize: $5,000; Format: 32MS/32WS/32MD/16WD/32XD	Score: 19–21, 21–15, 25–23	
7 August	Brazil International: Host: Foz do Iguaçu, Paraná, Brazil; Venue: Ginásio de Esportes Costa Cavalcanti; Level: International Series; Prize: $5,000; Format: 32MS/32WS/32MD/16WD/32XD	(Algeria) Koceila Mammeri (Algeria) Youcef Sabri Medel	(Brazil) Fabrício Farias (Brazil) Davi Silva
7 August	Brazil International: Host: Foz do Iguaçu, Paraná, Brazil; Venue: Ginásio de Esportes Costa Cavalcanti; Level: International Series; Prize: $5,000; Format: 32MS/32WS/32MD/16WD/32XD	Score: 21–16, 21–18	
7 August	Brazil International: Host: Foz do Iguaçu, Paraná, Brazil; Venue: Ginásio de Esportes Costa Cavalcanti; Level: International Series; Prize: $5,000; Format: 32MS/32WS/32MD/16WD/32XD	(Brazil) Jaqueline Lima (Brazil) Sâmia Lima	(Mexico) Haramara Gaitán (Mexico) Sabrina Solis
7 August	Brazil International: Host: Foz do Iguaçu, Paraná, Brazil; Venue: Ginásio de Esportes Costa Cavalcanti; Level: International Series; Prize: $5,000; Format: 32MS/32WS/32MD/16WD/32XD	Score: 21–11, 21–13	
7 August	Brazil International: Host: Foz do Iguaçu, Paraná, Brazil; Venue: Ginásio de Esportes Costa Cavalcanti; Level: International Series; Prize: $5,000; Format: 32MS/32WS/32MD/16WD/32XD	(Brazil) Davi Silva (Brazil) Sânia Lima	(Algeria) Koceila Mammeri (Algeria) Tanina Mammeri
7 August	Brazil International: Host: Foz do Iguaçu, Paraná, Brazil; Venue: Ginásio de Esportes Costa Cavalcanti; Level: International Series; Prize: $5,000; Format: 32MS/32WS/32MD/16WD/32XD	Score: 21–12, 21–15	
14 August	Maldives International: Host: Malé, Maldives; Venue: Malé Sports Complex; Level: International Series; Prize: $5,000; Format: 64MS/64WS/32MD/32WD/16XD	(Indonesia) Krishna Adi Nugraha	(India) Sathish Karunakaran
14 August	Maldives International: Host: Malé, Maldives; Venue: Malé Sports Complex; Level: International Series; Prize: $5,000; Format: 64MS/64WS/32MD/32WD/16XD	Score: 21–12, 21–11	
14 August	Maldives International: Host: Malé, Maldives; Venue: Malé Sports Complex; Level: International Series; Prize: $5,000; Format: 64MS/64WS/32MD/32WD/16XD	(Japan) Sorano Yoshikawa	(India) Deepshikha Singh
14 August	Maldives International: Host: Malé, Maldives; Venue: Malé Sports Complex; Level: International Series; Prize: $5,000; Format: 64MS/64WS/32MD/32WD/16XD	Score: 21–13, 21–12	
14 August	Maldives International: Host: Malé, Maldives; Venue: Malé Sports Complex; Level: International Series; Prize: $5,000; Format: 64MS/64WS/32MD/32WD/16XD	(Malaysia) Choi Jian Sheng (Malaysia) Bryan Goonting	(Malaysia) Fazriq Razif (Malaysia) Wong Vin Sean
14 August	Maldives International: Host: Malé, Maldives; Venue: Malé Sports Complex; Level: International Series; Prize: $5,000; Format: 64MS/64WS/32MD/32WD/16XD	Score: 10–21, 21–18, 21–15	
14 August	Maldives International: Host: Malé, Maldives; Venue: Malé Sports Complex; Level: International Series; Prize: $5,000; Format: 64MS/64WS/32MD/32WD/16XD	(Malaysia) Ho Lo Ee (Malaysia) Amanda Yap	(Malaysia) Go Pei Kee (Malaysia) Valeree Siow
14 August	Maldives International: Host: Malé, Maldives; Venue: Malé Sports Complex; Level: International Series; Prize: $5,000; Format: 64MS/64WS/32MD/32WD/16XD	Score: 21–18, 9–21, 21–18	
14 August	Maldives International: Host: Malé, Maldives; Venue: Malé Sports Complex; Level: International Series; Prize: $5,000; Format: 64MS/64WS/32MD/32WD/16XD	(India) Sathish Karunakaran (India) Aadya Variyath	(Malaysia) Loo Bing Kun (Malaysia) Cheng Su Yin
14 August	Maldives International: Host: Malé, Maldives; Venue: Malé Sports Complex; Level: International Series; Prize: $5,000; Format: 64MS/64WS/32MD/32WD/16XD	Score: 21–19, 16–21, 21–16	
14 August	Paraguay International (cancelled) (Note: This tournament, originally to be played on 15–19 August, was later cancelled.): Host: Ciudad del Este, Paraguay; Venue: Polideportivo MCDE; Level: International Series; Prize: $5,000; Format: 32MS/32WS/32MD/16WD/32XD		
14 August	Paraguay International (cancelled): Host: Ciudad del Este, Paraguay; Venue: Polideportivo MCDE; Level: International Series; Prize: $5,000; Format: 32MS/32WS/32MD/16WD/32XD	Score:	
14 August	Paraguay International (cancelled): Host: Ciudad del Este, Paraguay; Venue: Polideportivo MCDE; Level: International Series; Prize: $5,000; Format: 32MS/32WS/32MD/16WD/32XD	Score:	
14 August	Paraguay International (cancelled): Host: Ciudad del Este, Paraguay; Venue: Polideportivo MCDE; Level: International Series; Prize: $5,000; Format: 32MS/32WS/32MD/16WD/32XD	Score:	
14 August	Paraguay International (cancelled): Host: Ciudad del Este, Paraguay; Venue: Polideportivo MCDE; Level: International Series; Prize: $5,000; Format: 32MS/32WS/32MD/16WD/32XD	Score:	
14 August	Paraguay International (cancelled): Host: Ciudad del Este, Paraguay; Venue: Polideportivo MCDE; Level: International Series; Prize: $5,000; Format: 32MS/32WS/32MD/16WD/32XD	Score:	
21 August	World Championships (Draw): Host: Copenhagen, Denmark; Venue: Royal Arena; Level: World Championships; Prize: N/A; Format: 64MS/48WS/48MD/48WD/48XD	(Thailand) Kunlavut Vitidsarn	(Japan) Kodai Naraoka
21 August	World Championships (Draw): Host: Copenhagen, Denmark; Venue: Royal Arena; Level: World Championships; Prize: N/A; Format: 64MS/48WS/48MD/48WD/48XD	Score: 19–21, 21–18, 21–7	
21 August	World Championships (Draw): Host: Copenhagen, Denmark; Venue: Royal Arena; Level: World Championships; Prize: N/A; Format: 64MS/48WS/48MD/48WD/48XD	(South Korea) An Se-young	(Spain) Carolina Marín
21 August	World Championships (Draw): Host: Copenhagen, Denmark; Venue: Royal Arena; Level: World Championships; Prize: N/A; Format: 64MS/48WS/48MD/48WD/48XD	Score: 21–12, 21–10	
21 August	World Championships (Draw): Host: Copenhagen, Denmark; Venue: Royal Arena; Level: World Championships; Prize: N/A; Format: 64MS/48WS/48MD/48WD/48XD	(South Korea) Kang Min-hyuk (South Korea) Seo Seung-jae	(Denmark) Kim Astrup (Denmark) Anders Skaarup Rasmussen
21 August	World Championships (Draw): Host: Copenhagen, Denmark; Venue: Royal Arena; Level: World Championships; Prize: N/A; Format: 64MS/48WS/48MD/48WD/48XD	Score: 14–21, 21–15, 21–17	
21 August	World Championships (Draw): Host: Copenhagen, Denmark; Venue: Royal Arena; Level: World Championships; Prize: N/A; Format: 64MS/48WS/48MD/48WD/48XD	(China) Chen Qingchen (China) Jia Yifan	(Indonesia) Apriyani Rahayu (Indonesia) Siti Fadia Silva Ramadhanti
21 August	World Championships (Draw): Host: Copenhagen, Denmark; Venue: Royal Arena; Level: World Championships; Prize: N/A; Format: 64MS/48WS/48MD/48WD/48XD	Score: 21–16, 21–12	
21 August	World Championships (Draw): Host: Copenhagen, Denmark; Venue: Royal Arena; Level: World Championships; Prize: N/A; Format: 64MS/48WS/48MD/48WD/48XD	(South Korea) Seo Seung-jae (South Korea) Chae Yoo-jung	(China) Zheng Siwei (China) Huang Yaqiong
21 August	World Championships (Draw): Host: Copenhagen, Denmark; Venue: Royal Arena; Level: World Championships; Prize: N/A; Format: 64MS/48WS/48MD/48WD/48XD	Score: 21–17, 10–21, 21–18	
21 August	Cameroon International: Host: Yaoundé, Cameroon; Venue: Yaoundé Sports Complex; Level: International Series; Prize: $10,000; Format: 32MS/32WS/16MD/8WD/16XD	(Norway) Markus Barth	(United Arab Emirates) Somi Romdhani
21 August	Cameroon International: Host: Yaoundé, Cameroon; Venue: Yaoundé Sports Complex; Level: International Series; Prize: $10,000; Format: 32MS/32WS/16MD/8WD/16XD	Score: 13–21, 21–7, 21–17	
21 August	Cameroon International: Host: Yaoundé, Cameroon; Venue: Yaoundé Sports Complex; Level: International Series; Prize: $10,000; Format: 32MS/32WS/16MD/8WD/16XD	(Azerbaijan) Keisha Fatimah Azzahra	(Israel) Ksenia Polikarpova
21 August	Cameroon International: Host: Yaoundé, Cameroon; Venue: Yaoundé Sports Complex; Level: International Series; Prize: $10,000; Format: 32MS/32WS/16MD/8WD/16XD	Score: 21–14, 21–16	
21 August	Cameroon International: Host: Yaoundé, Cameroon; Venue: Yaoundé Sports Complex; Level: International Series; Prize: $10,000; Format: 32MS/32WS/16MD/8WD/16XD	(India) P.S Ravikrishna (India) Sankar Prasad Udayakumar	(Algeria) Koceila Mammeri (Algeria) Youcef Sabri Medel
21 August	Cameroon International: Host: Yaoundé, Cameroon; Venue: Yaoundé Sports Complex; Level: International Series; Prize: $10,000; Format: 32MS/32WS/16MD/8WD/16XD	Score: 21–12, 21–19	
21 August	Cameroon International: Host: Yaoundé, Cameroon; Venue: Yaoundé Sports Complex; Level: International Series; Prize: $10,000; Format: 32MS/32WS/16MD/8WD/16XD	(India) Rutaparna Panda (India) Swetaparna Panda	(Uganda) Husina Kobugabe (Uganda) Gladys Mbabazi
21 August	Cameroon International: Host: Yaoundé, Cameroon; Venue: Yaoundé Sports Complex; Level: International Series; Prize: $10,000; Format: 32MS/32WS/16MD/8WD/16XD	Score: 21–16, 21–8	
21 August	Cameroon International: Host: Yaoundé, Cameroon; Venue: Yaoundé Sports Complex; Level: International Series; Prize: $10,000; Format: 32MS/32WS/16MD/8WD/16XD	(Algeria) Koceila Mammeri (Algeria) Tanina Mammeri	(Slovenia) Miha Ivančič (Slovenia) Petra Polanc
21 August	Cameroon International: Host: Yaoundé, Cameroon; Venue: Yaoundé Sports Complex; Level: International Series; Prize: $10,000; Format: 32MS/32WS/16MD/8WD/16XD	Score: 21–17, 21–17	
21 August	Trinidad and Tobago International: Host: Tacarigua, Trinidad and Tobago; Venue: Racquet Center; Level: International Series; Prize: $5,000; Format: 64MS/64WS/16MD/16WD/32XD	(United States) Mark Alcala	(Mexico) Luis Ramon Garrido
21 August	Trinidad and Tobago International: Host: Tacarigua, Trinidad and Tobago; Venue: Racquet Center; Level: International Series; Prize: $5,000; Format: 64MS/64WS/16MD/16WD/32XD	Score: 21–19, 21–18	
21 August	Trinidad and Tobago International: Host: Tacarigua, Trinidad and Tobago; Venue: Racquet Center; Level: International Series; Prize: $5,000; Format: 64MS/64WS/16MD/16WD/32XD	(Canada) Eliana Zhang	(Mexico) Vanessa García
21 August	Trinidad and Tobago International: Host: Tacarigua, Trinidad and Tobago; Venue: Racquet Center; Level: International Series; Prize: $5,000; Format: 64MS/64WS/16MD/16WD/32XD	Score: 21–17, 21–18	
21 August	Trinidad and Tobago International: Host: Tacarigua, Trinidad and Tobago; Venue: Racquet Center; Level: International Series; Prize: $5,000; Format: 64MS/64WS/16MD/16WD/32XD	(United States) Ryan Ma (Canada) Daniel Zhou	(England) Kelvin Ho (Jamaica) Samuel Ricketts
21 August	Trinidad and Tobago International: Host: Tacarigua, Trinidad and Tobago; Venue: Racquet Center; Level: International Series; Prize: $5,000; Format: 64MS/64WS/16MD/16WD/32XD	Score: 21–18, 21–17	
21 August	Trinidad and Tobago International: Host: Tacarigua, Trinidad and Tobago; Venue: Racquet Center; Level: International Series; Prize: $5,000; Format: 64MS/64WS/16MD/16WD/32XD	(Canada) Jeslyn Chow (Canada) Eliana Zhang	(Guyana) Priyanna Ramdhani (Barbados) Monyata Riviera
21 August	Trinidad and Tobago International: Host: Tacarigua, Trinidad and Tobago; Venue: Racquet Center; Level: International Series; Prize: $5,000; Format: 64MS/64WS/16MD/16WD/32XD	Score: Walkover	
21 August	Trinidad and Tobago International: Host: Tacarigua, Trinidad and Tobago; Venue: Racquet Center; Level: International Series; Prize: $5,000; Format: 64MS/64WS/16MD/16WD/32XD	(Jamaica) Samuel Ricketts (Jamaica) Tahlia Richardson	(Guyana) Akili Haynes (Guyana) Priyanna Ramdhani
21 August	Trinidad and Tobago International: Host: Tacarigua, Trinidad and Tobago; Venue: Racquet Center; Level: International Series; Prize: $5,000; Format: 64MS/64WS/16MD/16WD/32XD	Score: Walkover	
28 August	Lagos International Classics: Host: Surulere, Nigeria; Venue: Sir Molade Okoya Thomas Indoor Hall; Level: International Challenge; Prize: $15,000; Format: 32MS/32WS/16MD/16WD/16XD	(Brazil) Jonathan Matias	(Spain) Pablo Abián
28 August	Lagos International Classics: Host: Surulere, Nigeria; Venue: Sir Molade Okoya Thomas Indoor Hall; Level: International Challenge; Prize: $15,000; Format: 32MS/32WS/16MD/16WD/16XD	Score: 21–18, 21–19	
28 August	Lagos International Classics: Host: Surulere, Nigeria; Venue: Sir Molade Okoya Thomas Indoor Hall; Level: International Challenge; Prize: $15,000; Format: 32MS/32WS/16MD/16WD/16XD	(Peru) Inés Castillo	(United States) Lauren Lam
28 August	Lagos International Classics: Host: Surulere, Nigeria; Venue: Sir Molade Okoya Thomas Indoor Hall; Level: International Challenge; Prize: $15,000; Format: 32MS/32WS/16MD/16WD/16XD	Score: Walkover	
28 August	Lagos International Classics: Host: Surulere, Nigeria; Venue: Sir Molade Okoya Thomas Indoor Hall; Level: International Challenge; Prize: $15,000; Format: 32MS/32WS/16MD/16WD/16XD	(India) P.S Ravikrishna (India) Sankar Prasad Udayakumar	(Algeria) Koceila Mammeri (Algeria) Youcef Sabri Medel
28 August	Lagos International Classics: Host: Surulere, Nigeria; Venue: Sir Molade Okoya Thomas Indoor Hall; Level: International Challenge; Prize: $15,000; Format: 32MS/32WS/16MD/16WD/16XD	Score: 21–15, 21–14	
28 August	Lagos International Classics: Host: Surulere, Nigeria; Venue: Sir Molade Okoya Thomas Indoor Hall; Level: International Challenge; Prize: $15,000; Format: 32MS/32WS/16MD/16WD/16XD	(India) Simran Singhi (India) Ritika Thaker	(United States) Paula Lynn Cao Hok (United States) Lauren Lam
28 August	Lagos International Classics: Host: Surulere, Nigeria; Venue: Sir Molade Okoya Thomas Indoor Hall; Level: International Challenge; Prize: $15,000; Format: 32MS/32WS/16MD/16WD/16XD	Score: Walkover	
28 August	Lagos International Classics: Host: Surulere, Nigeria; Venue: Sir Molade Okoya Thomas Indoor Hall; Level: International Challenge; Prize: $15,000; Format: 32MS/32WS/16MD/16WD/16XD	(Peru) José Guevara (Peru) Inés Castillo	(Slovenia) Miha Ivančič (Slovenia) Petra Polanc
28 August	Lagos International Classics: Host: Surulere, Nigeria; Venue: Sir Molade Okoya Thomas Indoor Hall; Level: International Challenge; Prize: $15,000; Format: 32MS/32WS/16MD/16WD/16XD	Score: 21–17, 21–15	
28 August	Indonesia International (Medan): Host: Medan, North Sumatra, Indonesia; Venue: GOR PBSI Pancing Medan; Level: International Challenge; Prize: $15,000; Format: 64MS/32WS/32MD/32WD/32XD	(Indonesia) Alwi Farhan	(Sri Lanka) Viren Nettasinghe
28 August	Indonesia International (Medan): Host: Medan, North Sumatra, Indonesia; Venue: GOR PBSI Pancing Medan; Level: International Challenge; Prize: $15,000; Format: 64MS/32WS/32MD/32WD/32XD	Score: 21–15, 21–10	
28 August	Indonesia International (Medan): Host: Medan, North Sumatra, Indonesia; Venue: GOR PBSI Pancing Medan; Level: International Challenge; Prize: $15,000; Format: 64MS/32WS/32MD/32WD/32XD	(Indonesia) Ester Nurumi Tri Wardoyo	(Indonesia) Gabriela Meilani Moningka
28 August	Indonesia International (Medan): Host: Medan, North Sumatra, Indonesia; Venue: GOR PBSI Pancing Medan; Level: International Challenge; Prize: $15,000; Format: 64MS/32WS/32MD/32WD/32XD	Score: 21–13, 21–16	
28 August	Indonesia International (Medan): Host: Medan, North Sumatra, Indonesia; Venue: GOR PBSI Pancing Medan; Level: International Challenge; Prize: $15,000; Format: 64MS/32WS/32MD/32WD/32XD	(Indonesia) Berry Angriawan (Indonesia) Rian Agung Saputro	(Indonesia) Sabar Karyaman Gutama (Indonesia) Muhammad Reza Pahlevi Isfahani
28 August	Indonesia International (Medan): Host: Medan, North Sumatra, Indonesia; Venue: GOR PBSI Pancing Medan; Level: International Challenge; Prize: $15,000; Format: 64MS/32WS/32MD/32WD/32XD	Score: 19–21, 21–19, 21–17	
28 August	Indonesia International (Medan): Host: Medan, North Sumatra, Indonesia; Venue: GOR PBSI Pancing Medan; Level: International Challenge; Prize: $15,000; Format: 64MS/32WS/32MD/32WD/32XD	(Indonesia) Jesita Putri Miantoro (Indonesia) Febi Setianingrum	(Indonesia) Velisha Christina (Indonesia) Bernadine Anindya Wardana
28 August	Indonesia International (Medan): Host: Medan, North Sumatra, Indonesia; Venue: GOR PBSI Pancing Medan; Level: International Challenge; Prize: $15,000; Format: 64MS/32WS/32MD/32WD/32XD	Score: 21–17, 21–11	
28 August	Indonesia International (Medan): Host: Medan, North Sumatra, Indonesia; Venue: GOR PBSI Pancing Medan; Level: International Challenge; Prize: $15,000; Format: 64MS/32WS/32MD/32WD/32XD	(Thailand) Weeraphat Phakjarung (Thailand) Ornnicha Jongsathapornparn	(Indonesia) Marwan Faza (Indonesia) Jessica Maya Rismawardani
28 August	Indonesia International (Medan): Host: Medan, North Sumatra, Indonesia; Venue: GOR PBSI Pancing Medan; Level: International Challenge; Prize: $15,000; Format: 64MS/32WS/32MD/32WD/32XD	Score: 21–17, 12–21, 21–9	
28 August	Latvia International: Host: Riga, Latvia; Venue: Rimi Olimpiskais centrs; Level: Future Series; Format: 32MS/32WS/32MD/32WD/32XD	(Croatia) Aria Dinata	(Israel) Daniil Dubovenko
28 August	Latvia International: Host: Riga, Latvia; Venue: Rimi Olimpiskais centrs; Level: Future Series; Format: 32MS/32WS/32MD/32WD/32XD	Score: 15–21, 26–24, 13–9^{r}	
28 August	Latvia International: Host: Riga, Latvia; Venue: Rimi Olimpiskais centrs; Level: Future Series; Format: 32MS/32WS/32MD/32WD/32XD	(Denmark) Irina Amalie Andersen	(Switzerland) Dounia Pelupessy
28 August	Latvia International: Host: Riga, Latvia; Venue: Rimi Olimpiskais centrs; Level: Future Series; Format: 32MS/32WS/32MD/32WD/32XD	Score: 21–15, 11–21, 21–12	
28 August	Latvia International: Host: Riga, Latvia; Venue: Rimi Olimpiskais centrs; Level: Future Series; Format: 32MS/32WS/32MD/32WD/32XD	(Germany) Marvin Datko (Germany) Jarne Schlevoigt	(France) Baptiste Labarthe (France) Tom Lalot Trescarte
28 August	Latvia International: Host: Riga, Latvia; Venue: Rimi Olimpiskais centrs; Level: Future Series; Format: 32MS/32WS/32MD/32WD/32XD	Score: 21–17, 16–21, 21–18	
28 August	Latvia International: Host: Riga, Latvia; Venue: Rimi Olimpiskais centrs; Level: Future Series; Format: 32MS/32WS/32MD/32WD/32XD	(Estonia) Kati-Kreet Marran (Estonia) Helina Rüütel	(Germany) Amelie Lehmann (Germany) Marie Sophie Stern
28 August	Latvia International: Host: Riga, Latvia; Venue: Rimi Olimpiskais centrs; Level: Future Series; Format: 32MS/32WS/32MD/32WD/32XD	Score: 21–9, 21–9	
28 August	Latvia International: Host: Riga, Latvia; Venue: Rimi Olimpiskais centrs; Level: Future Series; Format: 32MS/32WS/32MD/32WD/32XD	(France) Tom Lalot Trescarte (France) Elsa Jacob	(Germany) David Eckerlin (Germany) Amelie Lehmann
28 August	Latvia International: Host: Riga, Latvia; Venue: Rimi Olimpiskais centrs; Level: Future Series; Format: 32MS/32WS/32MD/32WD/32XD	Score: 21–16, 21–11	
28 August	Mexico Future Series: Host: Guadalajara, Mexico; Venue: CODE 2; Level: Future Series; Format: 32MS/32WS/32MD/8WD/16XD	(Mexico) Luis Ramón Garrido	(United States) William Hu
28 August	Mexico Future Series: Host: Guadalajara, Mexico; Venue: CODE 2; Level: Future Series; Format: 32MS/32WS/32MD/8WD/16XD	Score: 21–11, 21–17	
28 August	Mexico Future Series: Host: Guadalajara, Mexico; Venue: CODE 2; Level: Future Series; Format: 32MS/32WS/32MD/8WD/16XD	(Guatemala) Nikté Sotomayor	(Mexico) Haramara Gaitán
28 August	Mexico Future Series: Host: Guadalajara, Mexico; Venue: CODE 2; Level: Future Series; Format: 32MS/32WS/32MD/8WD/16XD	Score: 21–16, 22–20	
28 August	Mexico Future Series: Host: Guadalajara, Mexico; Venue: CODE 2; Level: Future Series; Format: 32MS/32WS/32MD/8WD/16XD	(Guatemala) José Granados (Guatemala) Antonio Ortíz	(United States) Kevin Fu (United States) Nicholas Lai
28 August	Mexico Future Series: Host: Guadalajara, Mexico; Venue: CODE 2; Level: Future Series; Format: 32MS/32WS/32MD/8WD/16XD	Score: 21–14, 14–21, 21–14	
28 August	Mexico Future Series: Host: Guadalajara, Mexico; Venue: CODE 2; Level: Future Series; Format: 32MS/32WS/32MD/8WD/16XD	(Mexico) Romina Fregoso (Mexico) Miriam Rodríguez	(Mexico) Joceline López (Mexico) Mayté Macías
28 August	Mexico Future Series: Host: Guadalajara, Mexico; Venue: CODE 2; Level: Future Series; Format: 32MS/32WS/32MD/8WD/16XD	Score: 21–13, 21–8	
28 August	Mexico Future Series: Host: Guadalajara, Mexico; Venue: CODE 2; Level: Future Series; Format: 32MS/32WS/32MD/8WD/16XD	(Mexico) Luis Montoya (Mexico) Miriam Rodríguez	(Canada) Daniel Zhou (Canada) Chloe Hoang
28 August	Mexico Future Series: Host: Guadalajara, Mexico; Venue: CODE 2; Level: Future Series; Format: 32MS/32WS/32MD/8WD/16XD	Score: 21–13, 23–25, 21–14	

=== September ===
Week commencing	Tournament	Champions	Runners-up
4 September	China Open (Draw): Host: Changzhou, China; Venue: Xincheng Gymnasium; Level: Super 1000; Prize: $2,000,000; Format: 32MS/32WS/32MD/32WD/32XD	(Denmark) Viktor Axelsen	(China) Lu Guangzu
4 September	China Open (Draw): Host: Changzhou, China; Venue: Xincheng Gymnasium; Level: Super 1000; Prize: $2,000,000; Format: 32MS/32WS/32MD/32WD/32XD	Score: 21–16, 21–19	
4 September	China Open (Draw): Host: Changzhou, China; Venue: Xincheng Gymnasium; Level: Super 1000; Prize: $2,000,000; Format: 32MS/32WS/32MD/32WD/32XD	(South Korea) An Se-young	(Japan) Akane Yamaguchi
4 September	China Open (Draw): Host: Changzhou, China; Venue: Xincheng Gymnasium; Level: Super 1000; Prize: $2,000,000; Format: 32MS/32WS/32MD/32WD/32XD	Score: 21–10, 21–19	
4 September	China Open (Draw): Host: Changzhou, China; Venue: Xincheng Gymnasium; Level: Super 1000; Prize: $2,000,000; Format: 32MS/32WS/32MD/32WD/32XD	(China) Liang Weikeng (China) Wang Chang	(Malaysia) Aaron Chia (Malaysia) Soh Wooi Yik
4 September	China Open (Draw): Host: Changzhou, China; Venue: Xincheng Gymnasium; Level: Super 1000; Prize: $2,000,000; Format: 32MS/32WS/32MD/32WD/32XD	Score: 21–12, 21–14	
4 September	China Open (Draw): Host: Changzhou, China; Venue: Xincheng Gymnasium; Level: Super 1000; Prize: $2,000,000; Format: 32MS/32WS/32MD/32WD/32XD	(China) Chen Qingchen (China) Jia Yifan	(South Korea) Baek Ha-na (South Korea) Lee So-hee
4 September	China Open (Draw): Host: Changzhou, China; Venue: Xincheng Gymnasium; Level: Super 1000; Prize: $2,000,000; Format: 32MS/32WS/32MD/32WD/32XD	Score: 21–11, 21–17	
4 September	China Open (Draw): Host: Changzhou, China; Venue: Xincheng Gymnasium; Level: Super 1000; Prize: $2,000,000; Format: 32MS/32WS/32MD/32WD/32XD	(South Korea) Seo Seung-jae (South Korea) Chae Yoo-jung	(France) Thom Gicquel (France) Delphine Delrue
4 September	China Open (Draw): Host: Changzhou, China; Venue: Xincheng Gymnasium; Level: Super 1000; Prize: $2,000,000; Format: 32MS/32WS/32MD/32WD/32XD	Score: 21–19, 21–12	
4 September	Indonesia Masters Super 100 I (Draw): Host: Medan, Indonesia; Venue: GOR PBSI Pancing Medan; Level: Super 100; Prize: $100,000; Format: 48MS/32WS/32MD/32WD/32XD	(India) Kiran George	(Japan) Koo Takahashi
4 September	Indonesia Masters Super 100 I (Draw): Host: Medan, Indonesia; Venue: GOR PBSI Pancing Medan; Level: Super 100; Prize: $100,000; Format: 48MS/32WS/32MD/32WD/32XD	Score: 21–19, 22–20	
4 September	Indonesia Masters Super 100 I (Draw): Host: Medan, Indonesia; Venue: GOR PBSI Pancing Medan; Level: Super 100; Prize: $100,000; Format: 48MS/32WS/32MD/32WD/32XD	(Indonesia) Ester Nurumi Tri Wardoyo	(Chinese Taipei) Chiu Pin-chian
4 September	Indonesia Masters Super 100 I (Draw): Host: Medan, Indonesia; Venue: GOR PBSI Pancing Medan; Level: Super 100; Prize: $100,000; Format: 48MS/32WS/32MD/32WD/32XD	Score: 21–15, 21–19	
4 September	Indonesia Masters Super 100 I (Draw): Host: Medan, Indonesia; Venue: GOR PBSI Pancing Medan; Level: Super 100; Prize: $100,000; Format: 48MS/32WS/32MD/32WD/32XD	(Indonesia) Sabar Karyaman Gutama (Indonesia) Muhammad Reza Pahlevi Isfahani	(Japan) Kakeru Kumagai (Japan) Kota Ogawa
4 September	Indonesia Masters Super 100 I (Draw): Host: Medan, Indonesia; Venue: GOR PBSI Pancing Medan; Level: Super 100; Prize: $100,000; Format: 48MS/32WS/32MD/32WD/32XD	Score: 21–18, 21–15	
4 September	Indonesia Masters Super 100 I (Draw): Host: Medan, Indonesia; Venue: GOR PBSI Pancing Medan; Level: Super 100; Prize: $100,000; Format: 48MS/32WS/32MD/32WD/32XD	(Indonesia) Lanny Tria Mayasari (Indonesia) Ribka Sugiarto	(Chinese Taipei) Chang Ching-hui (Chinese Taipei) Yang Ching-tun
4 September	Indonesia Masters Super 100 I (Draw): Host: Medan, Indonesia; Venue: GOR PBSI Pancing Medan; Level: Super 100; Prize: $100,000; Format: 48MS/32WS/32MD/32WD/32XD	Score: 22–20, 21–10	
4 September	Indonesia Masters Super 100 I (Draw): Host: Medan, Indonesia; Venue: GOR PBSI Pancing Medan; Level: Super 100; Prize: $100,000; Format: 48MS/32WS/32MD/32WD/32XD	(Malaysia) Yap Roy King (Malaysia) Valeree Siow	(Japan) Hiroki Nishi (Japan) Akari Sato
4 September	Indonesia Masters Super 100 I (Draw): Host: Medan, Indonesia; Venue: GOR PBSI Pancing Medan; Level: Super 100; Prize: $100,000; Format: 48MS/32WS/32MD/32WD/32XD	Score: 13–21, 21–14, 21–14	
4 September	Guatemala International: Host: Guatemala City, Guatemala; Venue: Gimnasio Teodoro Palacios Flores; Level: International Challenge; Prize: $15,000; Format: 32MS/32WS/32MD/32WD/32XD	(Brazil) Ygor Coelho	(Guatemala) Kevin Cordón
4 September	Guatemala International: Host: Guatemala City, Guatemala; Venue: Gimnasio Teodoro Palacios Flores; Level: International Challenge; Prize: $15,000; Format: 32MS/32WS/32MD/32WD/32XD	Score: 17–21, 21–11, 23–21	
4 September	Guatemala International: Host: Guatemala City, Guatemala; Venue: Gimnasio Teodoro Palacios Flores; Level: International Challenge; Prize: $15,000; Format: 32MS/32WS/32MD/32WD/32XD	(India) Samiya Imad Farooqui	(United States) Ishika Jaiswal
4 September	Guatemala International: Host: Guatemala City, Guatemala; Venue: Gimnasio Teodoro Palacios Flores; Level: International Challenge; Prize: $15,000; Format: 32MS/32WS/32MD/32WD/32XD	Score: 21–15, 21–15	
4 September	Guatemala International: Host: Guatemala City, Guatemala; Venue: Gimnasio Teodoro Palacios Flores; Level: International Challenge; Prize: $15,000; Format: 32MS/32WS/32MD/32WD/32XD	(Canada) Kevin Lee (Canada) Ty Alexander Lindeman	(Brazil) Fabrício Farias (Brazil) Davi Silva
4 September	Guatemala International: Host: Guatemala City, Guatemala; Venue: Gimnasio Teodoro Palacios Flores; Level: International Challenge; Prize: $15,000; Format: 32MS/32WS/32MD/32WD/32XD	Score: 21–18, 21–14	
4 September	Guatemala International: Host: Guatemala City, Guatemala; Venue: Gimnasio Teodoro Palacios Flores; Level: International Challenge; Prize: $15,000; Format: 32MS/32WS/32MD/32WD/32XD	(Canada) Catherine Choi (Canada) Josephine Wu	(United States) Annie Xu (United States) Kerry Xu
4 September	Guatemala International: Host: Guatemala City, Guatemala; Venue: Gimnasio Teodoro Palacios Flores; Level: International Challenge; Prize: $15,000; Format: 32MS/32WS/32MD/32WD/32XD	Score: 21–18, 21–18	
4 September	Guatemala International: Host: Guatemala City, Guatemala; Venue: Gimnasio Teodoro Palacios Flores; Level: International Challenge; Prize: $15,000; Format: 32MS/32WS/32MD/32WD/32XD	(Canada) Ty Alexander Lindeman (Canada) Josephine Wu	(Canada) Kevin Lee (Canada) Eliana Zhang
4 September	Guatemala International: Host: Guatemala City, Guatemala; Venue: Gimnasio Teodoro Palacios Flores; Level: International Challenge; Prize: $15,000; Format: 32MS/32WS/32MD/32WD/32XD	Score: 21–9, 21–11	
4 September	Slovenia Future Series: Host: Otočec, Slovenia; Venue: Sportni center Otocec; Level: Future Series; Format: 32MS/32WS/32MD/16WD/32XD	(Denmark) Jakob Houe	(Croatia) Arie Dinata
4 September	Slovenia Future Series: Host: Otočec, Slovenia; Venue: Sportni center Otocec; Level: Future Series; Format: 32MS/32WS/32MD/16WD/32XD	Score: 21–19, 21–19	
4 September	Slovenia Future Series: Host: Otočec, Slovenia; Venue: Sportni center Otocec; Level: Future Series; Format: 32MS/32WS/32MD/16WD/32XD	(Israel) Heli Neiman	(Czech Republic) Lucie Krulová
4 September	Slovenia Future Series: Host: Otočec, Slovenia; Venue: Sportni center Otocec; Level: Future Series; Format: 32MS/32WS/32MD/16WD/32XD	Score: 17–21, 21–13, 22–20	
4 September	Slovenia Future Series: Host: Otočec, Slovenia; Venue: Sportni center Otocec; Level: Future Series; Format: 32MS/32WS/32MD/16WD/32XD	(Germany) Marvin Datko (Germany) Jarne Schlevoigt	(Sweden) Filip Karlborg (Sweden) Mio Molin
4 September	Slovenia Future Series: Host: Otočec, Slovenia; Venue: Sportni center Otocec; Level: Future Series; Format: 32MS/32WS/32MD/16WD/32XD	Score: 21–10, 14–21, 22–20	
4 September	Slovenia Future Series: Host: Otočec, Slovenia; Venue: Sportni center Otocec; Level: Future Series; Format: 32MS/32WS/32MD/16WD/32XD	(Italy) Martina Corsini (Sweden) Miranda Johansson	(Czech Republic) Soňa Hořínková (Czech Republic) Kateřina Zuzáková
4 September	Slovenia Future Series: Host: Otočec, Slovenia; Venue: Sportni center Otocec; Level: Future Series; Format: 32MS/32WS/32MD/16WD/32XD	Score: 21–18, 20–22, 21–17	
4 September	Slovenia Future Series: Host: Otočec, Slovenia; Venue: Sportni center Otocec; Level: Future Series; Format: 32MS/32WS/32MD/16WD/32XD	(Germany) Jarne Schlevoigt (Germany) Julia Meyer	(Sweden) Jacob Ekman (Sweden) Nathalie Wang
4 September	Slovenia Future Series: Host: Otočec, Slovenia; Venue: Sportni center Otocec; Level: Future Series; Format: 32MS/32WS/32MD/16WD/32XD	Score: 21–18, 21–17	
4 September	Benin International: Host: Ouidah, Benin; Venue: Gymnase Institut Régional de Santé Publique; Level: Future Series; Format: 32MS/32WS/32MD/32WD/32XD	(Egypt) Adham Hatem Elgamal	(Uganda) Brian Kasirye
4 September	Benin International: Host: Ouidah, Benin; Venue: Gymnase Institut Régional de Santé Publique; Level: Future Series; Format: 32MS/32WS/32MD/32WD/32XD	Score: 21–11, 21–12	
4 September	Benin International: Host: Ouidah, Benin; Venue: Gymnase Institut Régional de Santé Publique; Level: Future Series; Format: 32MS/32WS/32MD/32WD/32XD	(South Africa) Johanita Scholtz	(Egypt) Nour Ahmed Youssri
4 September	Benin International: Host: Ouidah, Benin; Venue: Gymnase Institut Régional de Santé Publique; Level: Future Series; Format: 32MS/32WS/32MD/32WD/32XD	Score: 21–17, 20–22, 21–19	
4 September	Benin International: Host: Ouidah, Benin; Venue: Gymnase Institut Régional de Santé Publique; Level: Future Series; Format: 32MS/32WS/32MD/32WD/32XD	(Nigeria) Ogunsanwo David Oluwasegun (Nigeria) Godwin Olofua	(Nigeria) Joseph Emmanuel Emmy (Nigeria) Viktor Ikechukwu
4 September	Benin International: Host: Ouidah, Benin; Venue: Gymnase Institut Régional de Santé Publique; Level: Future Series; Format: 32MS/32WS/32MD/32WD/32XD	Score: 22–20, 21–10	
4 September	Benin International: Host: Ouidah, Benin; Venue: Gymnase Institut Régional de Santé Publique; Level: Future Series; Format: 32MS/32WS/32MD/32WD/32XD	(Uganda) Husina Kobugabe (Uganda) Gladys Mbabazi	(Nigeria) Grace Gabriel (Nigeria) Ramatu Yakubu
4 September	Benin International: Host: Ouidah, Benin; Venue: Gymnase Institut Régional de Santé Publique; Level: Future Series; Format: 32MS/32WS/32MD/32WD/32XD	Score: 20–22, 23–21, 21–18	
4 September	Benin International: Host: Ouidah, Benin; Venue: Gymnase Institut Régional de Santé Publique; Level: Future Series; Format: 32MS/32WS/32MD/32WD/32XD	(Egypt) Adham Hatem Elgamal (Egypt) Doha Hany	(Benin) Oswald Ash Fano-Dosh (Benin) Pernelle Fabossou
4 September	Benin International: Host: Ouidah, Benin; Venue: Gymnase Institut Régional de Santé Publique; Level: Future Series; Format: 32MS/32WS/32MD/32WD/32XD	Score: 21–9, 21–12	
11 September	Hong Kong Open (Draw): Host: Kowloon, Hong Kong; Venue: Hong Kong Coliseum; Level: Super 500; Prize: $420,000; Format: 32MS/32WS/32MD/32WD/32XD	(Indonesia) Jonatan Christie	(Japan) Kenta Nishimoto
11 September	Hong Kong Open (Draw): Host: Kowloon, Hong Kong; Venue: Hong Kong Coliseum; Level: Super 500; Prize: $420,000; Format: 32MS/32WS/32MD/32WD/32XD	Score: 12–21, 22–20, 21–18	
11 September	Hong Kong Open (Draw): Host: Kowloon, Hong Kong; Venue: Hong Kong Coliseum; Level: Super 500; Prize: $420,000; Format: 32MS/32WS/32MD/32WD/32XD	(Japan) Akane Yamaguchi	(China) Zhang Yiman
11 September	Hong Kong Open (Draw): Host: Kowloon, Hong Kong; Venue: Hong Kong Coliseum; Level: Super 500; Prize: $420,000; Format: 32MS/32WS/32MD/32WD/32XD	Score: 21–18, 21–15	
11 September	Hong Kong Open (Draw): Host: Kowloon, Hong Kong; Venue: Hong Kong Coliseum; Level: Super 500; Prize: $420,000; Format: 32MS/32WS/32MD/32WD/32XD	(Denmark) Kim Astrup (Denmark) Anders Skaarup Rasmussen	(Indonesia) Leo Rolly Carnando (Indonesia) Daniel Marthin
11 September	Hong Kong Open (Draw): Host: Kowloon, Hong Kong; Venue: Hong Kong Coliseum; Level: Super 500; Prize: $420,000; Format: 32MS/32WS/32MD/32WD/32XD	Score: 21–10, 22–24, 21–19	
11 September	Hong Kong Open (Draw): Host: Kowloon, Hong Kong; Venue: Hong Kong Coliseum; Level: Super 500; Prize: $420,000; Format: 32MS/32WS/32MD/32WD/32XD	(Indonesia) Apriyani Rahayu (Indonesia) Siti Fadia Silva Ramadhanti	(Malaysia) Pearly Tan (Malaysia) Thinaah Muralitharan
11 September	Hong Kong Open (Draw): Host: Kowloon, Hong Kong; Venue: Hong Kong Coliseum; Level: Super 500; Prize: $420,000; Format: 32MS/32WS/32MD/32WD/32XD	Score: 14–21, 24–22, 21–9	
11 September	Hong Kong Open (Draw): Host: Kowloon, Hong Kong; Venue: Hong Kong Coliseum; Level: Super 500; Prize: $420,000; Format: 32MS/32WS/32MD/32WD/32XD	(China) Guo Xinwa (China) Wei Yaxin	(Hong Kong) Tang Chun Man (Hong Kong) Tse Ying Suet
11 September	Hong Kong Open (Draw): Host: Kowloon, Hong Kong; Venue: Hong Kong Coliseum; Level: Super 500; Prize: $420,000; Format: 32MS/32WS/32MD/32WD/32XD	Score: 21–13, 21–19	
11 September	Vietnam Open (Draw): Host: Ho Chi Minh City, Vietnam; Venue: Nguyen Du Club; Level: Super 100; Prize: $100,000; Format: 48MS/32WS/32MD/32WD/32XD	(Chinese Taipei) Huang Yu-kai	(Japan) Takuma Obayashi
11 September	Vietnam Open (Draw): Host: Ho Chi Minh City, Vietnam; Venue: Nguyen Du Club; Level: Super 100; Prize: $100,000; Format: 48MS/32WS/32MD/32WD/32XD	Score: 21–13, 21–17	
11 September	Vietnam Open (Draw): Host: Ho Chi Minh City, Vietnam; Venue: Nguyen Du Club; Level: Super 100; Prize: $100,000; Format: 48MS/32WS/32MD/32WD/32XD	(Vietnam) Nguyễn Thùy Linh	(Japan) Akari Kurihara
11 September	Vietnam Open (Draw): Host: Ho Chi Minh City, Vietnam; Venue: Nguyen Du Club; Level: Super 100; Prize: $100,000; Format: 48MS/32WS/32MD/32WD/32XD	Score: 21–14, 11–21, 21–19	
11 September	Vietnam Open (Draw): Host: Ho Chi Minh City, Vietnam; Venue: Nguyen Du Club; Level: Super 100; Prize: $100,000; Format: 48MS/32WS/32MD/32WD/32XD	(Japan) Kenya Mitsuhashi (Japan) Hiroki Okamura	(Indonesia) Hardianto (Indonesia) Ade Yusuf Santoso
11 September	Vietnam Open (Draw): Host: Ho Chi Minh City, Vietnam; Venue: Nguyen Du Club; Level: Super 100; Prize: $100,000; Format: 48MS/32WS/32MD/32WD/32XD	Score: 21–19, 21–19	
11 September	Vietnam Open (Draw): Host: Ho Chi Minh City, Vietnam; Venue: Nguyen Du Club; Level: Super 100; Prize: $100,000; Format: 48MS/32WS/32MD/32WD/32XD	(Chinese Taipei) Hsieh Pei-shan (Chinese Taipei) Tseng Yu-chi	(Chinese Taipei) Hung En-tzu (Chinese Taipei) Lin Yu-pei
11 September	Vietnam Open (Draw): Host: Ho Chi Minh City, Vietnam; Venue: Nguyen Du Club; Level: Super 100; Prize: $100,000; Format: 48MS/32WS/32MD/32WD/32XD	Score: 21–18, 21–14	
11 September	Vietnam Open (Draw): Host: Ho Chi Minh City, Vietnam; Venue: Nguyen Du Club; Level: Super 100; Prize: $100,000; Format: 48MS/32WS/32MD/32WD/32XD	(Japan) Hiroki Nishi (Japan) Akari Sato	(Thailand) Ruttanapak Oupthong (Thailand) Jhenicha Sudjaipraparat
11 September	Vietnam Open (Draw): Host: Ho Chi Minh City, Vietnam; Venue: Nguyen Du Club; Level: Super 100; Prize: $100,000; Format: 48MS/32WS/32MD/32WD/32XD	Score: 15–21, 21–18, 21–14	
11 September	Belgian International: Host: Leuven, Belgium; Venue: Sportoase Philipssite Leuven; Level: International Challenge; Prize: $20,000; Format: 32MS/32WS/32MD/32WD/32XD	(France) Lucas Claerbout	(Finland) Joakim Oldorff
11 September	Belgian International: Host: Leuven, Belgium; Venue: Sportoase Philipssite Leuven; Level: International Challenge; Prize: $20,000; Format: 32MS/32WS/32MD/32WD/32XD	Score: 22–20, 21–17	
11 September	Belgian International: Host: Leuven, Belgium; Venue: Sportoase Philipssite Leuven; Level: International Challenge; Prize: $20,000; Format: 32MS/32WS/32MD/32WD/32XD	(Turkey) Neslihan Arın	(Denmark) Line Christophersen
11 September	Belgian International: Host: Leuven, Belgium; Venue: Sportoase Philipssite Leuven; Level: International Challenge; Prize: $20,000; Format: 32MS/32WS/32MD/32WD/32XD	Score: 21–11, 14–21, 21–17	
11 September	Belgian International: Host: Leuven, Belgium; Venue: Sportoase Philipssite Leuven; Level: International Challenge; Prize: $20,000; Format: 32MS/32WS/32MD/32WD/32XD	(Denmark) Andreas Søndergaard (Denmark) Jesper Toft	(Denmark) Daniel Lundgaard (Denmark) Mads Vestergaard
11 September	Belgian International: Host: Leuven, Belgium; Venue: Sportoase Philipssite Leuven; Level: International Challenge; Prize: $20,000; Format: 32MS/32WS/32MD/32WD/32XD	Score: 21–13, 26–24	
11 September	Belgian International: Host: Leuven, Belgium; Venue: Sportoase Philipssite Leuven; Level: International Challenge; Prize: $20,000; Format: 32MS/32WS/32MD/32WD/32XD	(Japan) Maiko Kawazoe (Japan) Haruna Konishi	(England) Lizzie Tolman (England) Estelle van Leeuwen
11 September	Belgian International: Host: Leuven, Belgium; Venue: Sportoase Philipssite Leuven; Level: International Challenge; Prize: $20,000; Format: 32MS/32WS/32MD/32WD/32XD	Score: 21–8, 21–10	
11 September	Belgian International: Host: Leuven, Belgium; Venue: Sportoase Philipssite Leuven; Level: International Challenge; Prize: $20,000; Format: 32MS/32WS/32MD/32WD/32XD	(England) Marcus Ellis (England) Lauren Smith	(Denmark) Mikkel Mikkelsen (Denmark) Rikke Søby Hansen
11 September	Belgian International: Host: Leuven, Belgium; Venue: Sportoase Philipssite Leuven; Level: International Challenge; Prize: $20,000; Format: 32MS/32WS/32MD/32WD/32XD	Score: 21–18, 21–15	
18 September	Peru Challenge: Host: Lima, Peru; Venue: Filial Villa Deportiva - Club Regatas Lima; Level: International Challenge; Prize: $15,000; Format: 32MS/32WS/32MD/16WD/32XD	(Japan) Takuma Kawamoto	(Guatemala) Kevin Cordón
18 September	Peru Challenge: Host: Lima, Peru; Venue: Filial Villa Deportiva - Club Regatas Lima; Level: International Challenge; Prize: $15,000; Format: 32MS/32WS/32MD/16WD/32XD	Score: 21–12, 16–21, 21–14	
18 September	Peru Challenge: Host: Lima, Peru; Venue: Filial Villa Deportiva - Club Regatas Lima; Level: International Challenge; Prize: $15,000; Format: 32MS/32WS/32MD/16WD/32XD	(Japan) Kaoru Sugiyama	(Peru) Inés Castillo
18 September	Peru Challenge: Host: Lima, Peru; Venue: Filial Villa Deportiva - Club Regatas Lima; Level: International Challenge; Prize: $15,000; Format: 32MS/32WS/32MD/16WD/32XD	Score: 21–3, 21–6	
18 September	Peru Challenge: Host: Lima, Peru; Venue: Filial Villa Deportiva - Club Regatas Lima; Level: International Challenge; Prize: $15,000; Format: 32MS/32WS/32MD/16WD/32XD	(Canada) Kevin Lee (Canada) Ty Alexander Lindeman	(Canada) Adam Dong (Canada) Nyl Yakura
18 September	Peru Challenge: Host: Lima, Peru; Venue: Filial Villa Deportiva - Club Regatas Lima; Level: International Challenge; Prize: $15,000; Format: 32MS/32WS/32MD/16WD/32XD	Score: 21–16, 21–18	
18 September	Peru Challenge: Host: Lima, Peru; Venue: Filial Villa Deportiva - Club Regatas Lima; Level: International Challenge; Prize: $15,000; Format: 32MS/32WS/32MD/16WD/32XD	(United States) Annie Xu (United States) Kerry Xu	(Brazil) Jaqueline Lima (Brazil) Sâmia Lima
18 September	Peru Challenge: Host: Lima, Peru; Venue: Filial Villa Deportiva - Club Regatas Lima; Level: International Challenge; Prize: $15,000; Format: 32MS/32WS/32MD/16WD/32XD	Score: 21–11, 21–10	
18 September	Peru Challenge: Host: Lima, Peru; Venue: Filial Villa Deportiva - Club Regatas Lima; Level: International Challenge; Prize: $15,000; Format: 32MS/32WS/32MD/16WD/32XD	(Canada) Ty Alexander Lindeman (Canada) Josephine Wu	(United States) Vinson Chiu (United States) Jennie Gai
18 September	Peru Challenge: Host: Lima, Peru; Venue: Filial Villa Deportiva - Club Regatas Lima; Level: International Challenge; Prize: $15,000; Format: 32MS/32WS/32MD/16WD/32XD	Score: 21–18, 21–15	
18 September	Thailand International: Host: Nonthaburi, Thailand; Venue: CentralPlaza Chaengwattana; Level: International Series; Prize: $5,000; Format: 64MS/32WS/32MD/32WD/32XD	(Japan) Riki Takei	(South Korea) Heo Kwang-hee
18 September	Thailand International: Host: Nonthaburi, Thailand; Venue: CentralPlaza Chaengwattana; Level: International Series; Prize: $5,000; Format: 64MS/32WS/32MD/32WD/32XD	Score: 17–21, 22–20, 21–17	
18 September	Thailand International: Host: Nonthaburi, Thailand; Venue: CentralPlaza Chaengwattana; Level: International Series; Prize: $5,000; Format: 64MS/32WS/32MD/32WD/32XD	(Japan) Runa Kurihara	(Thailand) Tidapron Kleebyeesun
18 September	Thailand International: Host: Nonthaburi, Thailand; Venue: CentralPlaza Chaengwattana; Level: International Series; Prize: $5,000; Format: 64MS/32WS/32MD/32WD/32XD	Score: 21–15, 21–14	
18 September	Thailand International: Host: Nonthaburi, Thailand; Venue: CentralPlaza Chaengwattana; Level: International Series; Prize: $5,000; Format: 64MS/32WS/32MD/32WD/32XD	(Japan) Kazuki Shibata (Japan) Naoki Yamada	(Thailand) Sirawit Sothon (Thailand) Natthapat Trinkajee
18 September	Thailand International: Host: Nonthaburi, Thailand; Venue: CentralPlaza Chaengwattana; Level: International Series; Prize: $5,000; Format: 64MS/32WS/32MD/32WD/32XD	Score: 21–17, 21–16	
18 September	Thailand International: Host: Nonthaburi, Thailand; Venue: CentralPlaza Chaengwattana; Level: International Series; Prize: $5,000; Format: 64MS/32WS/32MD/32WD/32XD	(South Korea) Kim Yu-jung (South Korea) Lee Yeon-woo	(Japan) Kokona Ishikawa (Japan) Mio Konegawa
18 September	Thailand International: Host: Nonthaburi, Thailand; Venue: CentralPlaza Chaengwattana; Level: International Series; Prize: $5,000; Format: 64MS/32WS/32MD/32WD/32XD	Score: 21–19, 21–11	
18 September	Thailand International: Host: Nonthaburi, Thailand; Venue: CentralPlaza Chaengwattana; Level: International Series; Prize: $5,000; Format: 64MS/32WS/32MD/32WD/32XD	(South Korea) Park Kyung-hoon (South Korea) Kim Yu-jung	(Indonesia) Pulung Ramadhan (Indonesia) Rinjani Kwinara Nastine
18 September	Thailand International: Host: Nonthaburi, Thailand; Venue: CentralPlaza Chaengwattana; Level: International Series; Prize: $5,000; Format: 64MS/32WS/32MD/32WD/32XD	Score: 21–17, 21–11	
18 September	Polish International: Host: Lublin, Poland; Venue: Hala sportowo-widowiskowa Uniwersytetu Medycznego w Lublinie; Level: International Series; Prize: $5,000; Format: 32MS/32WS/32MD/32WD/32XD	(Indonesia) Andi Fadel Muhammad	(Israel) Daniil Dubovenko
18 September	Polish International: Host: Lublin, Poland; Venue: Hala sportowo-widowiskowa Uniwersytetu Medycznego w Lublinie; Level: International Series; Prize: $5,000; Format: 32MS/32WS/32MD/32WD/32XD	Score: 21–10, 21–14	
18 September	Polish International: Host: Lublin, Poland; Venue: Hala sportowo-widowiskowa Uniwersytetu Medycznego w Lublinie; Level: International Series; Prize: $5,000; Format: 32MS/32WS/32MD/32WD/32XD	(Japan) Sorano Yoshikawa	(England) Freya Redfearn
18 September	Polish International: Host: Lublin, Poland; Venue: Hala sportowo-widowiskowa Uniwersytetu Medycznego w Lublinie; Level: International Series; Prize: $5,000; Format: 32MS/32WS/32MD/32WD/32XD	Score: 21–12, 22–20	
18 September	Polish International: Host: Lublin, Poland; Venue: Hala sportowo-widowiskowa Uniwersytetu Medycznego w Lublinie; Level: International Series; Prize: $5,000; Format: 32MS/32WS/32MD/32WD/32XD	(England) Callum Hemming (England) Ethan van Leeuwen	(Poland) Miłosz Bochat (Poland) Paweł Śmiłowski
18 September	Polish International: Host: Lublin, Poland; Venue: Hala sportowo-widowiskowa Uniwersytetu Medycznego w Lublinie; Level: International Series; Prize: $5,000; Format: 32MS/32WS/32MD/32WD/32XD	Score: 21–16, 21–12	
18 September	Polish International: Host: Lublin, Poland; Venue: Hala sportowo-widowiskowa Uniwersytetu Medycznego w Lublinie; Level: International Series; Prize: $5,000; Format: 32MS/32WS/32MD/32WD/32XD	(Turkey) Bengisu Erçetin (Turkey) Nazlıcan İnci	(England) Abbygael Harris (England) Annie Lado
18 September	Polish International: Host: Lublin, Poland; Venue: Hala sportowo-widowiskowa Uniwersytetu Medycznego w Lublinie; Level: International Series; Prize: $5,000; Format: 32MS/32WS/32MD/32WD/32XD	Score: 21–16, 21–10	
18 September	Polish International: Host: Lublin, Poland; Venue: Hala sportowo-widowiskowa Uniwersytetu Medycznego w Lublinie; Level: International Series; Prize: $5,000; Format: 32MS/32WS/32MD/32WD/32XD	(England) Callum Hemming (England) Estelle van Leeuwen	(Sweden) Melker Z-Bexell (Sweden) Tilda Sjoo
18 September	Polish International: Host: Lublin, Poland; Venue: Hala sportowo-widowiskowa Uniwersytetu Medycznego w Lublinie; Level: International Series; Prize: $5,000; Format: 32MS/32WS/32MD/32WD/32XD	Score: 21–14, 21–13	
25 September	2022 Asian Games (Draw): Host: Hangzhou, China; Venue: Binjiang Gymnasium; Level: Multisport; Format: 13 MT / 11 WT	China	India
25 September	2022 Asian Games (Draw): Host: Hangzhou, China; Venue: Binjiang Gymnasium; Level: Multisport; Format: 13 MT / 11 WT	Shi Yuqi	Lakshya Sen
25 September	2022 Asian Games (Draw): Host: Hangzhou, China; Venue: Binjiang Gymnasium; Level: Multisport; Format: 13 MT / 11 WT	Liang Weikeng; Wang Chang	Satwiksairaj Rankireddy; Chirag Shetty
25 September	2022 Asian Games (Draw): Host: Hangzhou, China; Venue: Binjiang Gymnasium; Level: Multisport; Format: 13 MT / 11 WT	Li Shifeng	Srikanth Kidambi
25 September	2022 Asian Games (Draw): Host: Hangzhou, China; Venue: Binjiang Gymnasium; Level: Multisport; Format: 13 MT / 11 WT	Liu Yuchen; Ou Xuanyi	Dhruv Kapila; K. Sai Pratheek
25 September	2022 Asian Games (Draw): Host: Hangzhou, China; Venue: Binjiang Gymnasium; Level: Multisport; Format: 13 MT / 11 WT	Weng Hongyang	Mithun Manjunath
25 September	2022 Asian Games (Draw): Host: Hangzhou, China; Venue: Binjiang Gymnasium; Level: Multisport; Format: 13 MT / 11 WT	Score: 3–2	
25 September	2022 Asian Games (Draw): Host: Hangzhou, China; Venue: Binjiang Gymnasium; Level: Multisport; Format: 13 MT / 11 WT	South Korea	China
25 September	2022 Asian Games (Draw): Host: Hangzhou, China; Venue: Binjiang Gymnasium; Level: Multisport; Format: 13 MT / 11 WT	An Se-young	Chen Yufei
25 September	2022 Asian Games (Draw): Host: Hangzhou, China; Venue: Binjiang Gymnasium; Level: Multisport; Format: 13 MT / 11 WT	Baek Ha-na; Lee So-hee	Chen Qingchen; Jia Yifan
25 September	2022 Asian Games (Draw): Host: Hangzhou, China; Venue: Binjiang Gymnasium; Level: Multisport; Format: 13 MT / 11 WT	Kim Ga-eun	He Bingjiao
25 September	2022 Asian Games (Draw): Host: Hangzhou, China; Venue: Binjiang Gymnasium; Level: Multisport; Format: 13 MT / 11 WT	Kim So-yeong; Kong Hee-yong	Zhang Shuxian; Zheng Yu
25 September	2022 Asian Games (Draw): Host: Hangzhou, China; Venue: Binjiang Gymnasium; Level: Multisport; Format: 13 MT / 11 WT	Kim Ga-ram	Han Yue
25 September	2022 Asian Games (Draw): Host: Hangzhou, China; Venue: Binjiang Gymnasium; Level: Multisport; Format: 13 MT / 11 WT	Score: 3–0	
25 September	Kaohsiung Masters (Draw): Host: Kaohsiung, Taiwan; Venue: K-Arena; Level: Super 100; Prize: $100,000; Format: 64MS/32WS/32MD/32WD/32XD	(Chinese Taipei) Lin Chun-yi	(Japan) Yushi Tanaka
25 September	Kaohsiung Masters (Draw): Host: Kaohsiung, Taiwan; Venue: K-Arena; Level: Super 100; Prize: $100,000; Format: 64MS/32WS/32MD/32WD/32XD	Score: 11–21, 21–17, 21–14	
25 September	Kaohsiung Masters (Draw): Host: Kaohsiung, Taiwan; Venue: K-Arena; Level: Super 100; Prize: $100,000; Format: 64MS/32WS/32MD/32WD/32XD	(Chinese Taipei) Liang Ting-yu	(Japan) Riko Gunji
25 September	Kaohsiung Masters (Draw): Host: Kaohsiung, Taiwan; Venue: K-Arena; Level: Super 100; Prize: $100,000; Format: 64MS/32WS/32MD/32WD/32XD	Score: 22–20, 15–21, 21–14	
25 September	Kaohsiung Masters (Draw): Host: Kaohsiung, Taiwan; Venue: K-Arena; Level: Super 100; Prize: $100,000; Format: 64MS/32WS/32MD/32WD/32XD	(Malaysia) Goh Sze Fei (Malaysia) Nur Izzuddin	(Chinese Taipei) Lee Jhe-huei (Chinese Taipei) Yang Po-hsuan
25 September	Kaohsiung Masters (Draw): Host: Kaohsiung, Taiwan; Venue: K-Arena; Level: Super 100; Prize: $100,000; Format: 64MS/32WS/32MD/32WD/32XD	Score: 21–14, 21–10	
25 September	Kaohsiung Masters (Draw): Host: Kaohsiung, Taiwan; Venue: K-Arena; Level: Super 100; Prize: $100,000; Format: 64MS/32WS/32MD/32WD/32XD	(Australia) Setyana Mapasa (Australia) Angela Yu	(Japan) Maiko Kawazoe (Japan) Haruna Konishi
25 September	Kaohsiung Masters (Draw): Host: Kaohsiung, Taiwan; Venue: K-Arena; Level: Super 100; Prize: $100,000; Format: 64MS/32WS/32MD/32WD/32XD	Score: 21–19, 8–21, 21–19	
25 September	Kaohsiung Masters (Draw): Host: Kaohsiung, Taiwan; Venue: K-Arena; Level: Super 100; Prize: $100,000; Format: 64MS/32WS/32MD/32WD/32XD	(Japan) Hiroki Nishi (Japan) Akari Sato	(Indonesia) Dejan Ferdinansyah (Indonesia) Gloria Emanuelle Widjaja
25 September	Kaohsiung Masters (Draw): Host: Kaohsiung, Taiwan; Venue: K-Arena; Level: Super 100; Prize: $100,000; Format: 64MS/32WS/32MD/32WD/32XD	Score: 22–20, 12–21, 21–14	
25 September	Croatian International: Host: Zagreb, Croatia; Venue: Dom Sportova; Level: Future Series; Format: 32MS/32WS/32MD/32WD/32XD	(Israel) Daniil Dubovenko	(Croatia) Aria Dinata
25 September	Croatian International: Host: Zagreb, Croatia; Venue: Dom Sportova; Level: Future Series; Format: 32MS/32WS/32MD/32WD/32XD	Score: 21–18, 21–16	
25 September	Croatian International: Host: Zagreb, Croatia; Venue: Dom Sportova; Level: Future Series; Format: 32MS/32WS/32MD/32WD/32XD	(Switzerland) Milena Schnider	(Switzerland) Azkya Aliefa Ruhanda
25 September	Croatian International: Host: Zagreb, Croatia; Venue: Dom Sportova; Level: Future Series; Format: 32MS/32WS/32MD/32WD/32XD	Score: 15–21, 21–8, 21–10	
25 September	Croatian International: Host: Zagreb, Croatia; Venue: Dom Sportova; Level: Future Series; Format: 32MS/32WS/32MD/32WD/32XD	(Poland) Robert Cybulski (Poland) Szymon Slepecki	(Poland) Jakub Melaniuk (Poland) Wiktor Trecki
25 September	Croatian International: Host: Zagreb, Croatia; Venue: Dom Sportova; Level: Future Series; Format: 32MS/32WS/32MD/32WD/32XD	Score: 21–13, 21–15	
25 September	Croatian International: Host: Zagreb, Croatia; Venue: Dom Sportova; Level: Future Series; Format: 32MS/32WS/32MD/32WD/32XD	(Poland) Paulina Hankiewicz (Poland) Kornelia Marczak	(France) Agathe Cuevas (France) Kathell Desmots-Chacun
25 September	Croatian International: Host: Zagreb, Croatia; Venue: Dom Sportova; Level: Future Series; Format: 32MS/32WS/32MD/32WD/32XD	Score: 12–21, 21–17, 21–19	
25 September	Croatian International: Host: Zagreb, Croatia; Venue: Dom Sportova; Level: Future Series; Format: 32MS/32WS/32MD/32WD/32XD	(England) Samuel Jones (England) Sian Kelly	(Czech Republic) Vít Kulíšek (Czech Republic) Kateřina Zuzáková
25 September	Croatian International: Host: Zagreb, Croatia; Venue: Dom Sportova; Level: Future Series; Format: 32MS/32WS/32MD/32WD/32XD	Score: 21–9, 21–13	
25 September	Kampala International: Host: Kampala, Uganda; Venue: MTN Arena; Level: Future Series; Prize: $4,000; Format: 32MS/32WS/32MD/16WD/16XD	(Uganda) Brian Kasirye	(United Arab Emirates) Somi Romdhani
25 September	Kampala International: Host: Kampala, Uganda; Venue: MTN Arena; Level: Future Series; Prize: $4,000; Format: 32MS/32WS/32MD/16WD/16XD	Score: 14–21, 21–16, 22–20	
25 September	Kampala International: Host: Kampala, Uganda; Venue: MTN Arena; Level: Future Series; Prize: $4,000; Format: 32MS/32WS/32MD/16WD/16XD	(France) Romane Cloteaux-Foucault	(United Arab Emirates) Nurani Ratu Azzahra
25 September	Kampala International: Host: Kampala, Uganda; Venue: MTN Arena; Level: Future Series; Prize: $4,000; Format: 32MS/32WS/32MD/16WD/16XD	Score: 21–14, 21–7	
25 September	Kampala International: Host: Kampala, Uganda; Venue: MTN Arena; Level: Future Series; Prize: $4,000; Format: 32MS/32WS/32MD/16WD/16XD	(Uganda) Brian Kasirye (Uganda) Muzafaru Lubega	(Malta) Matthew Abela (Israel) Maxim Grinblat
25 September	Kampala International: Host: Kampala, Uganda; Venue: MTN Arena; Level: Future Series; Prize: $4,000; Format: 32MS/32WS/32MD/16WD/16XD	Score: 21–15, 21–14	
25 September	Kampala International: Host: Kampala, Uganda; Venue: MTN Arena; Level: Future Series; Prize: $4,000; Format: 32MS/32WS/32MD/16WD/16XD	(India) Rutaparna Panda (India) Swetaparna Panda	(United Arab Emirates) Aleena Qathun (United Arab Emirates) Nayonika Rajesh
25 September	Kampala International: Host: Kampala, Uganda; Venue: MTN Arena; Level: Future Series; Prize: $4,000; Format: 32MS/32WS/32MD/16WD/16XD	Score: 21–9, 21–14	
25 September	Kampala International: Host: Kampala, Uganda; Venue: MTN Arena; Level: Future Series; Prize: $4,000; Format: 32MS/32WS/32MD/16WD/16XD	(United Arab Emirates) Kuswanto (United Arab Emirates) Sreeyuktha Sreejith Parol	(South Africa) Caden Kakora (South Africa) Johanita Scholtz
25 September	Kampala International: Host: Kampala, Uganda; Venue: MTN Arena; Level: Future Series; Prize: $4,000; Format: 32MS/32WS/32MD/16WD/16XD	Score: 21–9, 17–21, 25–23	

=== October ===
Date	Tournament	Champions	Runners-up
2 October	2022 Asian Games (Draw): Host: Hangzhou, Zhejiang, China; Venue: Binjiang Gymnasium; Level: Multisport; Format: 32MS/32WS/32MD/32WD/32XD	(China) Li Shifeng	(China) Shi Yuqi
2 October	2022 Asian Games (Draw): Host: Hangzhou, Zhejiang, China; Venue: Binjiang Gymnasium; Level: Multisport; Format: 32MS/32WS/32MD/32WD/32XD	Score: 23–21, 21–13	
2 October	2022 Asian Games (Draw): Host: Hangzhou, Zhejiang, China; Venue: Binjiang Gymnasium; Level: Multisport; Format: 32MS/32WS/32MD/32WD/32XD	(South Korea) An Se-young	(China) Chen Yufei
2 October	2022 Asian Games (Draw): Host: Hangzhou, Zhejiang, China; Venue: Binjiang Gymnasium; Level: Multisport; Format: 32MS/32WS/32MD/32WD/32XD	Score: 21–18, 17–21, 21–8	
2 October	2022 Asian Games (Draw): Host: Hangzhou, Zhejiang, China; Venue: Binjiang Gymnasium; Level: Multisport; Format: 32MS/32WS/32MD/32WD/32XD	(India) Satwiksairaj Rankireddy (India) Chirag Shetty	(South Korea) Choi Sol-gyu (South Korea) Kim Won-ho
2 October	2022 Asian Games (Draw): Host: Hangzhou, Zhejiang, China; Venue: Binjiang Gymnasium; Level: Multisport; Format: 32MS/32WS/32MD/32WD/32XD	Score: 21–18, 21–16	
2 October	2022 Asian Games (Draw): Host: Hangzhou, Zhejiang, China; Venue: Binjiang Gymnasium; Level: Multisport; Format: 32MS/32WS/32MD/32WD/32XD	(China) Chen Qingchen (China) Jia Yifan	(South Korea) Baek Ha-na (South Korea) Lee So-hee
2 October	2022 Asian Games (Draw): Host: Hangzhou, Zhejiang, China; Venue: Binjiang Gymnasium; Level: Multisport; Format: 32MS/32WS/32MD/32WD/32XD	Score: 21–18, 21–17	
2 October	2022 Asian Games (Draw): Host: Hangzhou, Zhejiang, China; Venue: Binjiang Gymnasium; Level: Multisport; Format: 32MS/32WS/32MD/32WD/32XD	(China) Zheng Siwei (China) Huang Yaqiong	(Japan) Yuta Watanabe (Japan) Arisa Higashino
2 October	2022 Asian Games (Draw): Host: Hangzhou, Zhejiang, China; Venue: Binjiang Gymnasium; Level: Multisport; Format: 32MS/32WS/32MD/32WD/32XD	Score: 21–15, 21–14	
2 October	Scottish Open: Host: Glasgow, Scotland; Venue: Emirates Arena; Level: International Challenge; Prize: $15,000; Format: 32MS/32WS/32MD/32WD/32XD	(Denmark) Mads Christophersen	(India) Sankar Subramanian
2 October	Scottish Open: Host: Glasgow, Scotland; Venue: Emirates Arena; Level: International Challenge; Prize: $15,000; Format: 32MS/32WS/32MD/32WD/32XD	Score: 21–16, 21–14	
2 October	Scottish Open: Host: Glasgow, Scotland; Venue: Emirates Arena; Level: International Challenge; Prize: $15,000; Format: 32MS/32WS/32MD/32WD/32XD	(Turkey) Neslihan Arın	(Estonia) Kristin Kuuba
2 October	Scottish Open: Host: Glasgow, Scotland; Venue: Emirates Arena; Level: International Challenge; Prize: $15,000; Format: 32MS/32WS/32MD/32WD/32XD	Score: 25–23, 21–13	
2 October	Scottish Open: Host: Glasgow, Scotland; Venue: Emirates Arena; Level: International Challenge; Prize: $15,000; Format: 32MS/32WS/32MD/32WD/32XD	(Denmark) Daniel Lundgaard (Denmark) Mads Vestergaard	(Denmark) Andreas Søndergaard (Denmark) Jesper Toft
2 October	Scottish Open: Host: Glasgow, Scotland; Venue: Emirates Arena; Level: International Challenge; Prize: $15,000; Format: 32MS/32WS/32MD/32WD/32XD	Score: 21–15, 11–21, 21–15	
2 October	Scottish Open: Host: Glasgow, Scotland; Venue: Emirates Arena; Level: International Challenge; Prize: $15,000; Format: 32MS/32WS/32MD/32WD/32XD	(Bulgaria) Gabriela Stoeva (Bulgaria) Stefani Stoeva	(Japan) Maiko Kawazoe (Japan) Haruna Konishi
2 October	Scottish Open: Host: Glasgow, Scotland; Venue: Emirates Arena; Level: International Challenge; Prize: $15,000; Format: 32MS/32WS/32MD/32WD/32XD	Score: 19–21, 21–11, 21–12	
2 October	Scottish Open: Host: Glasgow, Scotland; Venue: Emirates Arena; Level: International Challenge; Prize: $15,000; Format: 32MS/32WS/32MD/32WD/32XD	(Denmark) Mads Vestergaard (Denmark) Christine Busch	(Denmark) Jesper Toft (Denmark) Clara Graversen
2 October	Scottish Open: Host: Glasgow, Scotland; Venue: Emirates Arena; Level: International Challenge; Prize: $15,000; Format: 32MS/32WS/32MD/32WD/32XD	Score: 21–15, 21–19	
2 October	Malaysia International: Host: Kota Kinabalu, Sabah, Malaysia; Venue: Dewan Serbaguna Kompleks Pentadbiran Kerajaan Persekutuan Sabah; Level: International Series; Prize: $10,000; Format: 64MS/32WS/32MD/16WD/32XD	(Indonesia) Ikhsan Rumbay	(Indonesia) Krishna Adi Nugraha
2 October	Malaysia International: Host: Kota Kinabalu, Sabah, Malaysia; Venue: Dewan Serbaguna Kompleks Pentadbiran Kerajaan Persekutuan Sabah; Level: International Series; Prize: $10,000; Format: 64MS/32WS/32MD/16WD/32XD	Score: 21–14, 21–18	
2 October	Malaysia International: Host: Kota Kinabalu, Sabah, Malaysia; Venue: Dewan Serbaguna Kompleks Pentadbiran Kerajaan Persekutuan Sabah; Level: International Series; Prize: $10,000; Format: 64MS/32WS/32MD/16WD/32XD	(Singapore) Insyirah Khan	(Chinese Taipei) Lee Yu-hsuan
2 October	Malaysia International: Host: Kota Kinabalu, Sabah, Malaysia; Venue: Dewan Serbaguna Kompleks Pentadbiran Kerajaan Persekutuan Sabah; Level: International Series; Prize: $10,000; Format: 64MS/32WS/32MD/16WD/32XD	Score: 21–18, 21–18	
2 October	Malaysia International: Host: Kota Kinabalu, Sabah, Malaysia; Venue: Dewan Serbaguna Kompleks Pentadbiran Kerajaan Persekutuan Sabah; Level: International Series; Prize: $10,000; Format: 64MS/32WS/32MD/16WD/32XD	(Malaysia) Fazriq Razif (Malaysia) Wong Vin Sean	(Malaysia) Chia Wei Jie (Malaysia) Liew Xun
2 October	Malaysia International: Host: Kota Kinabalu, Sabah, Malaysia; Venue: Dewan Serbaguna Kompleks Pentadbiran Kerajaan Persekutuan Sabah; Level: International Series; Prize: $10,000; Format: 64MS/32WS/32MD/16WD/32XD	Score: 21–14, 21–16	
2 October	Malaysia International: Host: Kota Kinabalu, Sabah, Malaysia; Venue: Dewan Serbaguna Kompleks Pentadbiran Kerajaan Persekutuan Sabah; Level: International Series; Prize: $10,000; Format: 64MS/32WS/32MD/16WD/32XD	(Indonesia) Isyana Syahira Meida (Indonesia) Rinjani Kwinara Nastine	(Thailand) Supamart Mingchua (Thailand) Pattaraporn Rungruengpramong
2 October	Malaysia International: Host: Kota Kinabalu, Sabah, Malaysia; Venue: Dewan Serbaguna Kompleks Pentadbiran Kerajaan Persekutuan Sabah; Level: International Series; Prize: $10,000; Format: 64MS/32WS/32MD/16WD/32XD	Score: 23–21, 21–15	
2 October	Malaysia International: Host: Kota Kinabalu, Sabah, Malaysia; Venue: Dewan Serbaguna Kompleks Pentadbiran Kerajaan Persekutuan Sabah; Level: International Series; Prize: $10,000; Format: 64MS/32WS/32MD/16WD/32XD	(Malaysia) Loo Bing Kun (Malaysia) Cheng Su Yin	(India) Sathish Kumar Karunakaran (India) Aadya Variyath
2 October	Malaysia International: Host: Kota Kinabalu, Sabah, Malaysia; Venue: Dewan Serbaguna Kompleks Pentadbiran Kerajaan Persekutuan Sabah; Level: International Series; Prize: $10,000; Format: 64MS/32WS/32MD/16WD/32XD	Score: 21–18, 21–14	
2 October	Uganda International: Host: Kampala, Uganda; Venue: MTN Arena; Level: International Series; Prize: $10,000; Format: 32MS/32WS/32MD/16WD/32XD	(Mexico) Luis Ramón Garrido	(India) Vishal Vasudevan
2 October	Uganda International: Host: Kampala, Uganda; Venue: MTN Arena; Level: International Series; Prize: $10,000; Format: 32MS/32WS/32MD/16WD/32XD	Score: 22–20, 21–15	
2 October	Uganda International: Host: Kampala, Uganda; Venue: MTN Arena; Level: International Series; Prize: $10,000; Format: 32MS/32WS/32MD/16WD/32XD	(India) Meghana Reddy	(Poland) Wiktoria Dabczynska
2 October	Uganda International: Host: Kampala, Uganda; Venue: MTN Arena; Level: International Series; Prize: $10,000; Format: 32MS/32WS/32MD/16WD/32XD	Score: 21–8, 19–21, 21–17	
2 October	Uganda International: Host: Kampala, Uganda; Venue: MTN Arena; Level: International Series; Prize: $10,000; Format: 32MS/32WS/32MD/16WD/32XD	(Uganda) Brian Kasirye (Uganda) Muzafaru Lubega	(Malta) Matthew Abela (Israel) Maxim Grinblat
2 October	Uganda International: Host: Kampala, Uganda; Venue: MTN Arena; Level: International Series; Prize: $10,000; Format: 32MS/32WS/32MD/16WD/32XD	Score: Walkover	
2 October	Uganda International: Host: Kampala, Uganda; Venue: MTN Arena; Level: International Series; Prize: $10,000; Format: 32MS/32WS/32MD/16WD/32XD	(India) Rutaparna Panda (India) Swetaparna Panda	(Uganda) Fadilah Mohamed Rafi (Uganda) Tracy Naluwooza
2 October	Uganda International: Host: Kampala, Uganda; Venue: MTN Arena; Level: International Series; Prize: $10,000; Format: 32MS/32WS/32MD/16WD/32XD	Score: 21–13, 21–8	
2 October	Uganda International: Host: Kampala, Uganda; Venue: MTN Arena; Level: International Series; Prize: $10,000; Format: 32MS/32WS/32MD/16WD/32XD	(Algeria) Koceila Mammeri (Algeria) Tanina Mammeri	(South Africa) Caden Kakora (South Africa) Johanita Scholtz
2 October	Uganda International: Host: Kampala, Uganda; Venue: MTN Arena; Level: International Series; Prize: $10,000; Format: 32MS/32WS/32MD/16WD/32XD	Score: 21–17, 21–18	
2 October	Venezuela International: Host: Maracay, Venezuela; Venue: Gimnasio Cubierto Mauricio Johnson; Level: International Series; Prize: $5,000; Format: 32MS/32WS/16MD/16WD/32XD	(Italy) Giovanni Toti	(Italy) Fabio Caponio
2 October	Venezuela International: Host: Maracay, Venezuela; Venue: Gimnasio Cubierto Mauricio Johnson; Level: International Series; Prize: $5,000; Format: 32MS/32WS/16MD/16WD/32XD	Score: 21–12, 22–20	
2 October	Venezuela International: Host: Maracay, Venezuela; Venue: Gimnasio Cubierto Mauricio Johnson; Level: International Series; Prize: $5,000; Format: 32MS/32WS/16MD/16WD/32XD	(Peru) Inés Castillo	(Italy) Yasmine Hamza
2 October	Venezuela International: Host: Maracay, Venezuela; Venue: Gimnasio Cubierto Mauricio Johnson; Level: International Series; Prize: $5,000; Format: 32MS/32WS/16MD/16WD/32XD	Score: 21–12, 21–18	
2 October	Venezuela International: Host: Maracay, Venezuela; Venue: Gimnasio Cubierto Mauricio Johnson; Level: International Series; Prize: $5,000; Format: 32MS/32WS/16MD/16WD/32XD	(Mexico) Job Castillo (Mexico) Luis Montoya	(Dominican Republic) Yonatan Linarez (Dominican Republic) Angel Marinez
2 October	Venezuela International: Host: Maracay, Venezuela; Venue: Gimnasio Cubierto Mauricio Johnson; Level: International Series; Prize: $5,000; Format: 32MS/32WS/16MD/16WD/32XD	Score: 21–11, 21–12	
2 October	Venezuela International: Host: Maracay, Venezuela; Venue: Gimnasio Cubierto Mauricio Johnson; Level: International Series; Prize: $5,000; Format: 32MS/32WS/16MD/16WD/32XD	(Mexico) Romina Fregoso (Mexico) Miriam Rodríguez	(Mexico) Haramara Gaitán (Mexico) Sabrina Solis
2 October	Venezuela International: Host: Maracay, Venezuela; Venue: Gimnasio Cubierto Mauricio Johnson; Level: International Series; Prize: $5,000; Format: 32MS/32WS/16MD/16WD/32XD	Score: Walkover	
2 October	Venezuela International: Host: Maracay, Venezuela; Venue: Gimnasio Cubierto Mauricio Johnson; Level: International Series; Prize: $5,000; Format: 32MS/32WS/16MD/16WD/32XD	(Mexico) Luis Montoya (Mexico) Miriam Rodríguez	(Mexico) Job Castillo (Mexico) Romina Fregoso
2 October	Venezuela International: Host: Maracay, Venezuela; Venue: Gimnasio Cubierto Mauricio Johnson; Level: International Series; Prize: $5,000; Format: 32MS/32WS/16MD/16WD/32XD	Score: 21–13, 21–11	
2 October	Bulgarian International: Host: Sofia, Bulgaria; Venue: Sport Hall "Europe"; Level: Future Series; Format: 32MS/32WS/32MD/16WD/32XD	(Poland) Mikolaj Szymanowski	(France) Yohan Barbieri
2 October	Bulgarian International: Host: Sofia, Bulgaria; Venue: Sport Hall "Europe"; Level: Future Series; Format: 32MS/32WS/32MD/16WD/32XD	Score: 21–8, 21–16	
2 October	Bulgarian International: Host: Sofia, Bulgaria; Venue: Sport Hall "Europe"; Level: Future Series; Format: 32MS/32WS/32MD/16WD/32XD	(Bulgaria) Kaloyana Nalbantova	(Switzerland) Milena Schnider
2 October	Bulgarian International: Host: Sofia, Bulgaria; Venue: Sport Hall "Europe"; Level: Future Series; Format: 32MS/32WS/32MD/16WD/32XD	Score: 21–12, 15–21, 21–15	
2 October	Bulgarian International: Host: Sofia, Bulgaria; Venue: Sport Hall "Europe"; Level: Future Series; Format: 32MS/32WS/32MD/16WD/32XD	(Poland) Robert Cybulski (Poland) Szymon Slepecki	(Italy) Matteo Massetti (Italy) David Salutt
2 October	Bulgarian International: Host: Sofia, Bulgaria; Venue: Sport Hall "Europe"; Level: Future Series; Format: 32MS/32WS/32MD/16WD/32XD	Score: 21–12, 21–11	
2 October	Bulgarian International: Host: Sofia, Bulgaria; Venue: Sport Hall "Europe"; Level: Future Series; Format: 32MS/32WS/32MD/16WD/32XD	(Poland) Paulina Hankiewicz (Poland) Kornelia Marczak	(Denmark) Anne Fuglsang (Denmark) Laura Fløj Thomson
2 October	Bulgarian International: Host: Sofia, Bulgaria; Venue: Sport Hall "Europe"; Level: Future Series; Format: 32MS/32WS/32MD/16WD/32XD	Score: 18–21, 25–23, 21–19	
2 October	Bulgarian International: Host: Sofia, Bulgaria; Venue: Sport Hall "Europe"; Level: Future Series; Format: 32MS/32WS/32MD/16WD/32XD	(Poland) Robert Cybulski (Poland) Kornelia Marczak	(Poland) Jakub Melaniuk (Poland) Julia Plawecka
2 October	Bulgarian International: Host: Sofia, Bulgaria; Venue: Sport Hall "Europe"; Level: Future Series; Format: 32MS/32WS/32MD/16WD/32XD	Score: 21–19, 19–21, 21–12	
9 October	Arctic Open (Draw): Host: Vantaa, Finland; Venue: Energia Areena; Level: Super 500; Prize: $420,000; Format: 32MS/32WS/32MD/32WD/32XD	(Malaysia) Lee Zii Jia	(Malaysia) Ng Tze Yong
9 October	Arctic Open (Draw): Host: Vantaa, Finland; Venue: Energia Areena; Level: Super 500; Prize: $420,000; Format: 32MS/32WS/32MD/32WD/32XD	Score: 21–14, 21–15	
9 October	Arctic Open (Draw): Host: Vantaa, Finland; Venue: Energia Areena; Level: Super 500; Prize: $420,000; Format: 32MS/32WS/32MD/32WD/32XD	(China) Han Yue	(China) Wang Zhiyi
9 October	Arctic Open (Draw): Host: Vantaa, Finland; Venue: Energia Areena; Level: Super 500; Prize: $420,000; Format: 32MS/32WS/32MD/32WD/32XD	Score: 16–21, 22–20, 21–12	
9 October	Arctic Open (Draw): Host: Vantaa, Finland; Venue: Energia Areena; Level: Super 500; Prize: $420,000; Format: 32MS/32WS/32MD/32WD/32XD	(Denmark) Kim Astrup (Denmark) Anders Skaarup Rasmussen	(Malaysia) Man Wei Chong (Malaysia) Tee Kai Wun
9 October	Arctic Open (Draw): Host: Vantaa, Finland; Venue: Energia Areena; Level: Super 500; Prize: $420,000; Format: 32MS/32WS/32MD/32WD/32XD	Score: 21–18, 21–17	
9 October	Arctic Open (Draw): Host: Vantaa, Finland; Venue: Energia Areena; Level: Super 500; Prize: $420,000; Format: 32MS/32WS/32MD/32WD/32XD	(China) Liu Shengshu (China) Tan Ning	(Thailand) Jongkolphan Kititharakul (Thailand) Rawinda Prajongjai
9 October	Arctic Open (Draw): Host: Vantaa, Finland; Venue: Energia Areena; Level: Super 500; Prize: $420,000; Format: 32MS/32WS/32MD/32WD/32XD	Score: 21–13, 24–22	
9 October	Arctic Open (Draw): Host: Vantaa, Finland; Venue: Energia Areena; Level: Super 500; Prize: $420,000; Format: 32MS/32WS/32MD/32WD/32XD	(China) Feng Yanzhe (China) Huang Dongping	(China) Jiang Zhenbang (China) Wei Yaxin
9 October	Arctic Open (Draw): Host: Vantaa, Finland; Venue: Energia Areena; Level: Super 500; Prize: $420,000; Format: 32MS/32WS/32MD/32WD/32XD	Score: 21–14, 21–15	
9 October	Bendigo International: Host: Bendigo, Australia; Venue: Red Energy Arena Stadium; Level: International Challenge; Prize: $15,000; Format: 64MS/32WS/32MD/16WD/32XD	(Japan) Keita Makino	(Japan) Hikaru Minegishi
9 October	Bendigo International: Host: Bendigo, Australia; Venue: Red Energy Arena Stadium; Level: International Challenge; Prize: $15,000; Format: 64MS/32WS/32MD/16WD/32XD	Score: 21–12, 20–22, 21–16	
9 October	Bendigo International: Host: Bendigo, Australia; Venue: Red Energy Arena Stadium; Level: International Challenge; Prize: $15,000; Format: 64MS/32WS/32MD/16WD/32XD	(Singapore) Jaslyn Hooi	(Australia) Tse Ying
9 October	Bendigo International: Host: Bendigo, Australia; Venue: Red Energy Arena Stadium; Level: International Challenge; Prize: $15,000; Format: 64MS/32WS/32MD/16WD/32XD	Score: 21–7, 21–5	
9 October	Bendigo International: Host: Bendigo, Australia; Venue: Red Energy Arena Stadium; Level: International Challenge; Prize: $15,000; Format: 64MS/32WS/32MD/16WD/32XD	(Chinese Taipei) Chen Cheng-kuan (Chinese Taipei) Chen Sheng-fa	(Chinese Taipei) Chan Yueh-lin (Chinese Taipei) Chu Bo-rong
9 October	Bendigo International: Host: Bendigo, Australia; Venue: Red Energy Arena Stadium; Level: International Challenge; Prize: $15,000; Format: 64MS/32WS/32MD/16WD/32XD	Score: Walkover	
9 October	Bendigo International: Host: Bendigo, Australia; Venue: Red Energy Arena Stadium; Level: International Challenge; Prize: $15,000; Format: 64MS/32WS/32MD/16WD/32XD	(Australia) Setyana Mapasa (Australia) Angela Yu	(Chinese Taipei) Hsu Yin-hui (Chinese Taipei) Lin Jhih-yun
9 October	Bendigo International: Host: Bendigo, Australia; Venue: Red Energy Arena Stadium; Level: International Challenge; Prize: $15,000; Format: 64MS/32WS/32MD/16WD/32XD	Score: 18–21, 22–20, 27–25	
9 October	Bendigo International: Host: Bendigo, Australia; Venue: Red Energy Arena Stadium; Level: International Challenge; Prize: $15,000; Format: 64MS/32WS/32MD/16WD/32XD	(Chinese Taipei) Chen Sheng-fa (Chinese Taipei) Lin Jhih-yun	(Australia) Kenneth Choo (Australia) Gronya Somerville
9 October	Bendigo International: Host: Bendigo, Australia; Venue: Red Energy Arena Stadium; Level: International Challenge; Prize: $15,000; Format: 64MS/32WS/32MD/16WD/32XD	Score: 12–21, 21–14, 21–11	
9 October	Dutch Open: Host: 's-Hertogenbosch, Netherlands; Venue: Maaspoort; Level: International Challenge; Prize: $15,000; Format: 32MS/32WS/32MD/16WD/32XD	(Denmark) Victor Svendsen	(Denmark) Karan Rajan Rajarajan
9 October	Dutch Open: Host: 's-Hertogenbosch, Netherlands; Venue: Maaspoort; Level: International Challenge; Prize: $15,000; Format: 32MS/32WS/32MD/16WD/32XD	Score: 22–20, 21–9	
9 October	Dutch Open: Host: 's-Hertogenbosch, Netherlands; Venue: Maaspoort; Level: International Challenge; Prize: $15,000; Format: 32MS/32WS/32MD/16WD/32XD	(Denmark) Julie Dawall Jakobsen	(India) Samiya Imad Farooqui
9 October	Dutch Open: Host: 's-Hertogenbosch, Netherlands; Venue: Maaspoort; Level: International Challenge; Prize: $15,000; Format: 32MS/32WS/32MD/16WD/32XD	Score: 21–11, 21–7	
9 October	Dutch Open: Host: 's-Hertogenbosch, Netherlands; Venue: Maaspoort; Level: International Challenge; Prize: $15,000; Format: 32MS/32WS/32MD/16WD/32XD	(England) Rory Easton (England) Zach Russ	(England) Callum Hemming (England) Ethan van Leeuwen
9 October	Dutch Open: Host: 's-Hertogenbosch, Netherlands; Venue: Maaspoort; Level: International Challenge; Prize: $15,000; Format: 32MS/32WS/32MD/16WD/32XD	Score: 23–21, 21–17	
9 October	Dutch Open: Host: 's-Hertogenbosch, Netherlands; Venue: Maaspoort; Level: International Challenge; Prize: $15,000; Format: 32MS/32WS/32MD/16WD/32XD	(Netherlands) Debora Jille (Netherlands) Cheryl Seinen	(Denmark) Julie Finne-Ipsen (Denmark) Mai Surrow
9 October	Dutch Open: Host: 's-Hertogenbosch, Netherlands; Venue: Maaspoort; Level: International Challenge; Prize: $15,000; Format: 32MS/32WS/32MD/16WD/32XD	Score: 21–9, 21–13	
9 October	Dutch Open: Host: 's-Hertogenbosch, Netherlands; Venue: Maaspoort; Level: International Challenge; Prize: $15,000; Format: 32MS/32WS/32MD/16WD/32XD	(England) Callum Hemming (England) Estelle van Leeuwen	(Denmark) Rasmus Espersen (Denmark) Amalie Cecilie Kudsk
9 October	Dutch Open: Host: 's-Hertogenbosch, Netherlands; Venue: Maaspoort; Level: International Challenge; Prize: $15,000; Format: 32MS/32WS/32MD/16WD/32XD	Score: 21–18, 21–6	
9 October	Egypt International: Host: Cairo, Egypt; Venue: Cairo Stadium Indoor Halls Complex; Level: International Series; Prize: $10,000; Format: 32MS/32WS/32MD/32WD/32XD	(England) Harry Huang	(France) Yanis Gaudin
9 October	Egypt International: Host: Cairo, Egypt; Venue: Cairo Stadium Indoor Halls Complex; Level: International Series; Prize: $10,000; Format: 32MS/32WS/32MD/32WD/32XD	Score: 21–11, 9–21, 22–20	
9 October	Egypt International: Host: Cairo, Egypt; Venue: Cairo Stadium Indoor Halls Complex; Level: International Series; Prize: $10,000; Format: 32MS/32WS/32MD/32WD/32XD	(France) Romane Cloteaux-Foucault	(Poland) Wiktoria Dabczynska
9 October	Egypt International: Host: Cairo, Egypt; Venue: Cairo Stadium Indoor Halls Complex; Level: International Series; Prize: $10,000; Format: 32MS/32WS/32MD/32WD/32XD	Score: 21–13, 21–17	
9 October	Egypt International: Host: Cairo, Egypt; Venue: Cairo Stadium Indoor Halls Complex; Level: International Series; Prize: $10,000; Format: 32MS/32WS/32MD/32WD/32XD	(France) Louis Ducrot (France) Quentin Ronget	(Germany) Jones Ralfy Jansen (Germany) Kenneth Neumann
9 October	Egypt International: Host: Cairo, Egypt; Venue: Cairo Stadium Indoor Halls Complex; Level: International Series; Prize: $10,000; Format: 32MS/32WS/32MD/32WD/32XD	Score: 21–14, 21–17	
9 October	Egypt International: Host: Cairo, Egypt; Venue: Cairo Stadium Indoor Halls Complex; Level: International Series; Prize: $10,000; Format: 32MS/32WS/32MD/32WD/32XD	(Germany) Julia Meyer (Germany) Leona Michalski	(Algeria) Yasmina Chibah (Algeria) Linda Mazri
9 October	Egypt International: Host: Cairo, Egypt; Venue: Cairo Stadium Indoor Halls Complex; Level: International Series; Prize: $10,000; Format: 32MS/32WS/32MD/32WD/32XD	Score: 19–21, 21–11, 21–14	
9 October	Egypt International: Host: Cairo, Egypt; Venue: Cairo Stadium Indoor Halls Complex; Level: International Series; Prize: $10,000; Format: 32MS/32WS/32MD/32WD/32XD	(Germany) Jones Ralfy Jansen (Germany) Julia Meyer	(Algeria) Koceila Mammeri (Algeria) Tanina Mammeri
9 October	Egypt International: Host: Cairo, Egypt; Venue: Cairo Stadium Indoor Halls Complex; Level: International Series; Prize: $10,000; Format: 32MS/32WS/32MD/32WD/32XD	Score: 21–19, 21–18	
9 October	Peru International: Host: Lima, Peru; Venue: Polideportivo 2 Centro de Alto Rendimiento Villa Deportiva Nacional (VIDENA); Level: International Series; Prize: $5,000; Format: 32MS/32WS/8MD/8WD/16XD	(Italy) Fabio Caponio	(El Salvador) Uriel Canjura
9 October	Peru International: Host: Lima, Peru; Venue: Polideportivo 2 Centro de Alto Rendimiento Villa Deportiva Nacional (VIDENA); Level: International Series; Prize: $5,000; Format: 32MS/32WS/8MD/8WD/16XD	Score: 21–11, 21–18	
9 October	Peru International: Host: Lima, Peru; Venue: Polideportivo 2 Centro de Alto Rendimiento Villa Deportiva Nacional (VIDENA); Level: International Series; Prize: $5,000; Format: 32MS/32WS/8MD/8WD/16XD	(Peru) Inés Castillo	(Italy) Yasmine Hamza
9 October	Peru International: Host: Lima, Peru; Venue: Polideportivo 2 Centro de Alto Rendimiento Villa Deportiva Nacional (VIDENA); Level: International Series; Prize: $5,000; Format: 32MS/32WS/8MD/8WD/16XD	Score: 19–21, 21–15, 21–9	
9 October	Peru International: Host: Lima, Peru; Venue: Polideportivo 2 Centro de Alto Rendimiento Villa Deportiva Nacional (VIDENA); Level: International Series; Prize: $5,000; Format: 32MS/32WS/8MD/8WD/16XD	(Spain) Rubén García (Spain) Carlos Piris	(Spain) Jacobo Fernández (Spain) Álvaro Leal
9 October	Peru International: Host: Lima, Peru; Venue: Polideportivo 2 Centro de Alto Rendimiento Villa Deportiva Nacional (VIDENA); Level: International Series; Prize: $5,000; Format: 32MS/32WS/8MD/8WD/16XD	Score: 21–9, 23–21	
9 October	Peru International: Host: Lima, Peru; Venue: Polideportivo 2 Centro de Alto Rendimiento Villa Deportiva Nacional (VIDENA); Level: International Series; Prize: $5,000; Format: 32MS/32WS/8MD/8WD/16XD	(Spain) Paula López (Spain) Lucía Rodríguez	(Canada) Jeslyn Chow (Canada) Eliana Zhang
9 October	Peru International: Host: Lima, Peru; Venue: Polideportivo 2 Centro de Alto Rendimiento Villa Deportiva Nacional (VIDENA); Level: International Series; Prize: $5,000; Format: 32MS/32WS/8MD/8WD/16XD	Score: 21–11, 18–21, 21–11	
9 October	Peru International: Host: Lima, Peru; Venue: Polideportivo 2 Centro de Alto Rendimiento Villa Deportiva Nacional (VIDENA); Level: International Series; Prize: $5,000; Format: 32MS/32WS/8MD/8WD/16XD	(Spain) Jacobo Fernández (Spain) Paula López	(Spain) Rubén García (Spain) Lucía Rodríguez
9 October	Peru International: Host: Lima, Peru; Venue: Polideportivo 2 Centro de Alto Rendimiento Villa Deportiva Nacional (VIDENA); Level: International Series; Prize: $5,000; Format: 32MS/32WS/8MD/8WD/16XD	Score: 21–17, 21–16	
16 October	Pan American Games (Draw): Host: Santiago, Chile; Venue: Olympic Training Center; Level: Continental Championships; Format: 32MS/64WS/16MD/16WD/32XD	(Canada) Brian Yang	(Guatemala) Kevin Cordón
16 October	Pan American Games (Draw): Host: Santiago, Chile; Venue: Olympic Training Center; Level: Continental Championships; Format: 32MS/64WS/16MD/16WD/32XD	Score: 21–18, 21–6	
16 October	Pan American Games (Draw): Host: Santiago, Chile; Venue: Olympic Training Center; Level: Continental Championships; Format: 32MS/64WS/16MD/16WD/32XD	(United States) Beiwen Zhang	(United States) Jennie Gai
16 October	Pan American Games (Draw): Host: Santiago, Chile; Venue: Olympic Training Center; Level: Continental Championships; Format: 32MS/64WS/16MD/16WD/32XD	Score: 21–8, 21–12	
16 October	Pan American Games (Draw): Host: Santiago, Chile; Venue: Olympic Training Center; Level: Continental Championships; Format: 32MS/64WS/16MD/16WD/32XD	(Canada) Adam Dong (Canada) Nyl Yakura	(Brazil) Fabrício Farias (Brazil) Davi Silva
16 October	Pan American Games (Draw): Host: Santiago, Chile; Venue: Olympic Training Center; Level: Continental Championships; Format: 32MS/64WS/16MD/16WD/32XD	Score: 19–21, 21–15, 21–18	
16 October	Pan American Games (Draw): Host: Santiago, Chile; Venue: Olympic Training Center; Level: Continental Championships; Format: 32MS/64WS/16MD/16WD/32XD	(Canada) Catherine Choi (Canada) Josephine Wu	(United States) Annie Xu (United States) Kerry Xu
16 October	Pan American Games (Draw): Host: Santiago, Chile; Venue: Olympic Training Center; Level: Continental Championships; Format: 32MS/64WS/16MD/16WD/32XD	Score: 21–18, 10–21, 21–17	
16 October	Pan American Games (Draw): Host: Santiago, Chile; Venue: Olympic Training Center; Level: Continental Championships; Format: 32MS/64WS/16MD/16WD/32XD	(Canada) Ty Alexander Lindeman (Canada) Josephine Wu	(United States) Vinson Chiu (United States) Jennie Gai
16 October	Pan American Games (Draw): Host: Santiago, Chile; Venue: Olympic Training Center; Level: Continental Championships; Format: 32MS/64WS/16MD/16WD/32XD	Score: 17–21, 21–17, 21–19	
16 October	Denmark Open (Draw): Host: Odense, Denmark; Venue: Jyske Bank Arena; Level: Super 750; Prize: $850,000; Format: 32MS/32WS/32MD/32WD/32XD	(China) Weng Hongyang	(Malaysia) Lee Zii Jia
16 October	Denmark Open (Draw): Host: Odense, Denmark; Venue: Jyske Bank Arena; Level: Super 750; Prize: $850,000; Format: 32MS/32WS/32MD/32WD/32XD	Score: 21–12, 21–6	
16 October	Denmark Open (Draw): Host: Odense, Denmark; Venue: Jyske Bank Arena; Level: Super 750; Prize: $850,000; Format: 32MS/32WS/32MD/32WD/32XD	(China) Chen Yufei	(Spain) Carolina Marín
16 October	Denmark Open (Draw): Host: Odense, Denmark; Venue: Jyske Bank Arena; Level: Super 750; Prize: $850,000; Format: 32MS/32WS/32MD/32WD/32XD	Score: 21–14, 21–19	
16 October	Denmark Open (Draw): Host: Odense, Denmark; Venue: Jyske Bank Arena; Level: Super 750; Prize: $850,000; Format: 32MS/32WS/32MD/32WD/32XD	(Malaysia) Aaron Chia (Malaysia) Soh Wooi Yik	(Indonesia) Muhammad Shohibul Fikri (Indonesia) Bagas Maulana
16 October	Denmark Open (Draw): Host: Odense, Denmark; Venue: Jyske Bank Arena; Level: Super 750; Prize: $850,000; Format: 32MS/32WS/32MD/32WD/32XD	Score: 21–13, 21–17	
16 October	Denmark Open (Draw): Host: Odense, Denmark; Venue: Jyske Bank Arena; Level: Super 750; Prize: $850,000; Format: 32MS/32WS/32MD/32WD/32XD	(China) Chen Qingchen (China) Jia Yifan	(Japan) Nami Matsuyama (Japan) Chiharu Shida
16 October	Denmark Open (Draw): Host: Odense, Denmark; Venue: Jyske Bank Arena; Level: Super 750; Prize: $850,000; Format: 32MS/32WS/32MD/32WD/32XD	Score: 21–16, 21–13	
16 October	Denmark Open (Draw): Host: Odense, Denmark; Venue: Jyske Bank Arena; Level: Super 750; Prize: $850,000; Format: 32MS/32WS/32MD/32WD/32XD	(China) Feng Yanzhe (China) Huang Dongping	(China) Zheng Siwei (China) Huang Yaqiong
16 October	Denmark Open (Draw): Host: Odense, Denmark; Venue: Jyske Bank Arena; Level: Super 750; Prize: $850,000; Format: 32MS/32WS/32MD/32WD/32XD	Score: 16–21, 21–15, 26–24	
16 October	Abu Dhabi Masters (Draw): Host: Abu Dhabi, United Arab Emirates; Venue: ADNEC Marina Hall; Level: Super 100; Prize: $120,000; Format: 64MS/32WS/32MD/16WD/32XD	(Denmark) Mads Christophersen	(Netherlands) Mark Caljouw
16 October	Abu Dhabi Masters (Draw): Host: Abu Dhabi, United Arab Emirates; Venue: ADNEC Marina Hall; Level: Super 100; Prize: $120,000; Format: 64MS/32WS/32MD/16WD/32XD	Score: 21–19, 21–15	
16 October	Abu Dhabi Masters (Draw): Host: Abu Dhabi, United Arab Emirates; Venue: ADNEC Marina Hall; Level: Super 100; Prize: $120,000; Format: 64MS/32WS/32MD/16WD/32XD	(India) Unnati Hooda	(India) Samiya Imad Farooqui
16 October	Abu Dhabi Masters (Draw): Host: Abu Dhabi, United Arab Emirates; Venue: ADNEC Marina Hall; Level: Super 100; Prize: $120,000; Format: 64MS/32WS/32MD/16WD/32XD	Score: 21–16, 22–20	
16 October	Abu Dhabi Masters (Draw): Host: Abu Dhabi, United Arab Emirates; Venue: ADNEC Marina Hall; Level: Super 100; Prize: $120,000; Format: 64MS/32WS/32MD/16WD/32XD	(Malaysia) Goh Sze Fei (Malaysia) Nur Izzuddin	(Thailand) Pharanyu Kaosamaang (Thailand) Worrapol Thongsa-nga
16 October	Abu Dhabi Masters (Draw): Host: Abu Dhabi, United Arab Emirates; Venue: ADNEC Marina Hall; Level: Super 100; Prize: $120,000; Format: 64MS/32WS/32MD/16WD/32XD	Score: 18–21, 21–17, 21–12	
16 October	Abu Dhabi Masters (Draw): Host: Abu Dhabi, United Arab Emirates; Venue: ADNEC Marina Hall; Level: Super 100; Prize: $120,000; Format: 64MS/32WS/32MD/16WD/32XD	(India) Tanisha Crasto (India) Ashwini Ponnappa	(Denmark) Julie Finne-Ipsen (Denmark) Mai Surrow
16 October	Abu Dhabi Masters (Draw): Host: Abu Dhabi, United Arab Emirates; Venue: ADNEC Marina Hall; Level: Super 100; Prize: $120,000; Format: 64MS/32WS/32MD/16WD/32XD	Score: 21–16, 16–21, 21–8	
16 October	Abu Dhabi Masters (Draw): Host: Abu Dhabi, United Arab Emirates; Venue: ADNEC Marina Hall; Level: Super 100; Prize: $120,000; Format: 64MS/32WS/32MD/16WD/32XD	(Denmark) Mads Vestergaard (Denmark) Christine Busch	(Singapore) Terry Hee (Singapore) Jessica Tan
16 October	Abu Dhabi Masters (Draw): Host: Abu Dhabi, United Arab Emirates; Venue: ADNEC Marina Hall; Level: Super 100; Prize: $120,000; Format: 64MS/32WS/32MD/16WD/32XD	Score: 20–22, 21–17, 21–18	
16 October	Indonesia International (Surabaya): Host: Surabaya, East Java, Indonesia; Venue: Jatim International Expo Convention Exhibition; Level: International Challenge; Prize: $25,000; Format: 64MS/32WS/32MD/32WD/32XD	(Malaysia) Aidil Sholeh	(Japan) Keita Makino
16 October	Indonesia International (Surabaya): Host: Surabaya, East Java, Indonesia; Venue: Jatim International Expo Convention Exhibition; Level: International Challenge; Prize: $25,000; Format: 64MS/32WS/32MD/32WD/32XD	Score: 21–14, 21–6	
16 October	Indonesia International (Surabaya): Host: Surabaya, East Java, Indonesia; Venue: Jatim International Expo Convention Exhibition; Level: International Challenge; Prize: $25,000; Format: 64MS/32WS/32MD/32WD/32XD	(South Korea) Sim Yu-jin	(South Korea) Kim Ga-ram
16 October	Indonesia International (Surabaya): Host: Surabaya, East Java, Indonesia; Venue: Jatim International Expo Convention Exhibition; Level: International Challenge; Prize: $25,000; Format: 64MS/32WS/32MD/32WD/32XD	Score: 21–16, 21–13	
16 October	Indonesia International (Surabaya): Host: Surabaya, East Java, Indonesia; Venue: Jatim International Expo Convention Exhibition; Level: International Challenge; Prize: $25,000; Format: 64MS/32WS/32MD/32WD/32XD	(Japan) Kenya Mitsuhashi (Japan) Hiroki Okamura	(South Korea) Ki Dong-ju (South Korea) Kim Jae-hwan
16 October	Indonesia International (Surabaya): Host: Surabaya, East Java, Indonesia; Venue: Jatim International Expo Convention Exhibition; Level: International Challenge; Prize: $25,000; Format: 64MS/32WS/32MD/32WD/32XD	Score: 20–22, 21–16, 21–8	
16 October	Indonesia International (Surabaya): Host: Surabaya, East Java, Indonesia; Venue: Jatim International Expo Convention Exhibition; Level: International Challenge; Prize: $25,000; Format: 64MS/32WS/32MD/32WD/32XD	(Thailand) Laksika Kanlaha (Thailand) Phataimas Muenwong	(Japan) Sayaka Hobara (Japan) Yui Suizu
16 October	Indonesia International (Surabaya): Host: Surabaya, East Java, Indonesia; Venue: Jatim International Expo Convention Exhibition; Level: International Challenge; Prize: $25,000; Format: 64MS/32WS/32MD/32WD/32XD	Score: 21–18, 21–18	
16 October	Indonesia International (Surabaya): Host: Surabaya, East Java, Indonesia; Venue: Jatim International Expo Convention Exhibition; Level: International Challenge; Prize: $25,000; Format: 64MS/32WS/32MD/32WD/32XD	(Japan) Hiroki Nishi (Japan) Akari Sato	(Malaysia) Choong Hon Jian (Malaysia) Go Pei Kee
16 October	Indonesia International (Surabaya): Host: Surabaya, East Java, Indonesia; Venue: Jatim International Expo Convention Exhibition; Level: International Challenge; Prize: $25,000; Format: 64MS/32WS/32MD/32WD/32XD	Score: 22–20, 18–21, 21–14	
16 October	Sydney International: Host: Sydney, Australia; Venue: Sydney Olympic Park Sports Hall; Level: International Series; Prize: $5,000; Format: 64MS/32WS/32MD/16WD/32XD	(Chinese Taipei) Ting Yen-chen	(Australia) Karono
16 October	Sydney International: Host: Sydney, Australia; Venue: Sydney Olympic Park Sports Hall; Level: International Series; Prize: $5,000; Format: 64MS/32WS/32MD/16WD/32XD	Score: 21–14, 21–15	
16 October	Sydney International: Host: Sydney, Australia; Venue: Sydney Olympic Park Sports Hall; Level: International Series; Prize: $5,000; Format: 64MS/32WS/32MD/16WD/32XD	(Singapore) Jaslyn Hooi	(New Zealand) Shaunna Li
16 October	Sydney International: Host: Sydney, Australia; Venue: Sydney Olympic Park Sports Hall; Level: International Series; Prize: $5,000; Format: 64MS/32WS/32MD/16WD/32XD	Score: 21–17, 21–17	
16 October	Sydney International: Host: Sydney, Australia; Venue: Sydney Olympic Park Sports Hall; Level: International Series; Prize: $5,000; Format: 64MS/32WS/32MD/16WD/32XD	(Chinese Taipei) Chen Cheng-kuan (Chinese Taipei) Chen Sheng-fa	(Chinese Taipei) Chan Yueh-lin (Chinese Taipei) Chu Bo-rong
16 October	Sydney International: Host: Sydney, Australia; Venue: Sydney Olympic Park Sports Hall; Level: International Series; Prize: $5,000; Format: 64MS/32WS/32MD/16WD/32XD	Score: 21–16, 21–14	
16 October	Sydney International: Host: Sydney, Australia; Venue: Sydney Olympic Park Sports Hall; Level: International Series; Prize: $5,000; Format: 64MS/32WS/32MD/16WD/32XD	(Australia) Setyana Mapasa (Australia) Angela Yu	(Australia) Sylvina Kurniawan (Australia) Poon Lok Yan
16 October	Sydney International: Host: Sydney, Australia; Venue: Sydney Olympic Park Sports Hall; Level: International Series; Prize: $5,000; Format: 64MS/32WS/32MD/16WD/32XD	Score: 21–16, 21–18	
16 October	Sydney International: Host: Sydney, Australia; Venue: Sydney Olympic Park Sports Hall; Level: International Series; Prize: $5,000; Format: 64MS/32WS/32MD/16WD/32XD	(Chinese Taipei) Chen Sheng-fa (Chinese Taipei) Lin Jhih-yun	(Australia) Kenneth Choo (Australia) Gronya Somerville
16 October	Sydney International: Host: Sydney, Australia; Venue: Sydney Olympic Park Sports Hall; Level: International Series; Prize: $5,000; Format: 64MS/32WS/32MD/16WD/32XD	Score: 21–18, 21–11	
16 October	Czech Open: Host: Prague, Czech Republic; Venue: Královka Arena; Level: International Series; Prize: $5,000; Format: 32MS/32WS/32MD/32WD/32XD	(Czech Republic) Jan Louda	(Indonesia) Andi Fadel Muhammad
16 October	Czech Open: Host: Prague, Czech Republic; Venue: Královka Arena; Level: International Series; Prize: $5,000; Format: 32MS/32WS/32MD/32WD/32XD	Score: 21–17, 21–13	
16 October	Czech Open: Host: Prague, Czech Republic; Venue: Královka Arena; Level: International Series; Prize: $5,000; Format: 32MS/32WS/32MD/32WD/32XD	(Denmark) Frederikke Østergaard	(Turkey) Özge Bayrak
16 October	Czech Open: Host: Prague, Czech Republic; Venue: Královka Arena; Level: International Series; Prize: $5,000; Format: 32MS/32WS/32MD/32WD/32XD	Score: 21–18, 21–19	
16 October	Czech Open: Host: Prague, Czech Republic; Venue: Královka Arena; Level: International Series; Prize: $5,000; Format: 32MS/32WS/32MD/32WD/32XD	(United States) Chen Zhi-yi (United States) Presley Smith	(Czech Republic) Ondřej Král (Czech Republic) Adam Mendrek
16 October	Czech Open: Host: Prague, Czech Republic; Venue: Královka Arena; Level: International Series; Prize: $5,000; Format: 32MS/32WS/32MD/32WD/32XD	Score: 21–15, 21–11	
16 October	Czech Open: Host: Prague, Czech Republic; Venue: Královka Arena; Level: International Series; Prize: $5,000; Format: 32MS/32WS/32MD/32WD/32XD	(France) Tea Margueritte (France) Flavie Vallet	(Denmark) Maria Højlund Tommerup (Denmark) Kathrine Vang
16 October	Czech Open: Host: Prague, Czech Republic; Venue: Královka Arena; Level: International Series; Prize: $5,000; Format: 32MS/32WS/32MD/32WD/32XD	Score: 17–21, 21–17, 21–17	
16 October	Czech Open: Host: Prague, Czech Republic; Venue: Královka Arena; Level: International Series; Prize: $5,000; Format: 32MS/32WS/32MD/32WD/32XD	(Sweden) Ludwig Axelsson (Sweden) Jessica Silvennoinen	(France) Lucas Renoir (France) Tea Margueritte
16 October	Czech Open: Host: Prague, Czech Republic; Venue: Královka Arena; Level: International Series; Prize: $5,000; Format: 32MS/32WS/32MD/32WD/32XD	Score: 21–13, 22–24, 21–14	
16 October	Algeria International: Host: El Biar, Algeria; Venue: Salle OMS Mokhtar Laribi; Level: International Series; Prize: $5,000; Format: 32MS/16WS/16MD/16WD/16XD	(Azerbaijan) Ade Resky Dwicahyo	(France) Sacha Lévêque
16 October	Algeria International: Host: El Biar, Algeria; Venue: Salle OMS Mokhtar Laribi; Level: International Series; Prize: $5,000; Format: 32MS/16WS/16MD/16WD/16XD	Score: 15–21, 21–13, 21–18	
16 October	Algeria International: Host: El Biar, Algeria; Venue: Salle OMS Mokhtar Laribi; Level: International Series; Prize: $5,000; Format: 32MS/16WS/16MD/16WD/16XD	(France) Rosy Oktavia Pancasari	(Belgium) Clara Lassaux
16 October	Algeria International: Host: El Biar, Algeria; Venue: Salle OMS Mokhtar Laribi; Level: International Series; Prize: $5,000; Format: 32MS/16WS/16MD/16WD/16XD	Score: 21–16, 21–14	
16 October	Algeria International: Host: El Biar, Algeria; Venue: Salle OMS Mokhtar Laribi; Level: International Series; Prize: $5,000; Format: 32MS/16WS/16MD/16WD/16XD	(Algeria) Koceila Mammeri (Algeria) Youcef Sabri Medel	(Algeria) Mohamed Abderrahime Belarbi (Algeria) Adel Hamek
16 October	Algeria International: Host: El Biar, Algeria; Venue: Salle OMS Mokhtar Laribi; Level: International Series; Prize: $5,000; Format: 32MS/16WS/16MD/16WD/16XD	Score: 21–13, 27–25	
16 October	Algeria International: Host: El Biar, Algeria; Venue: Salle OMS Mokhtar Laribi; Level: International Series; Prize: $5,000; Format: 32MS/16WS/16MD/16WD/16XD	(South Africa) Amy Ackerman (South Africa) Deidre Laurens	(Algeria) Yasmina Chibah (Algeria) Linda Mazri
16 October	Algeria International: Host: El Biar, Algeria; Venue: Salle OMS Mokhtar Laribi; Level: International Series; Prize: $5,000; Format: 32MS/16WS/16MD/16WD/16XD	Score: 21–19, 21–12	
16 October	Algeria International: Host: El Biar, Algeria; Venue: Salle OMS Mokhtar Laribi; Level: International Series; Prize: $5,000; Format: 32MS/16WS/16MD/16WD/16XD	(Algeria) Koceila Mammeri (Algeria) Tanina Mammeri	(Switzerland) Hugo Chanthakesone (Switzerland) Leila Zarrouk
16 October	Algeria International: Host: El Biar, Algeria; Venue: Salle OMS Mokhtar Laribi; Level: International Series; Prize: $5,000; Format: 32MS/16WS/16MD/16WD/16XD	Score: 21–12, 21–6	
23 October	French Open (Draw): Host: Rennes, France; Venue: Glaz Arena; Level: Super 750; Prize: $850,000; Format: 32MS/32WS/32MD/32WD/32XD	(Indonesia) Jonatan Christie	(China) Li Shifeng
23 October	French Open (Draw): Host: Rennes, France; Venue: Glaz Arena; Level: Super 750; Prize: $850,000; Format: 32MS/32WS/32MD/32WD/32XD	Score: 16–21, 21–15, 21–14	
23 October	French Open (Draw): Host: Rennes, France; Venue: Glaz Arena; Level: Super 750; Prize: $850,000; Format: 32MS/32WS/32MD/32WD/32XD	(China) Chen Yufei	(Chinese Taipei) Tai Tzu-ying
23 October	French Open (Draw): Host: Rennes, France; Venue: Glaz Arena; Level: Super 750; Prize: $850,000; Format: 32MS/32WS/32MD/32WD/32XD	Score: 21–17, 22–20	
23 October	French Open (Draw): Host: Rennes, France; Venue: Glaz Arena; Level: Super 750; Prize: $850,000; Format: 32MS/32WS/32MD/32WD/32XD	(Denmark) Kim Astrup (Denmark) Anders Skaarup Rasmussen	(Indonesia) Muhammad Shohibul Fikri (Indonesia) Bagas Maulana
23 October	French Open (Draw): Host: Rennes, France; Venue: Glaz Arena; Level: Super 750; Prize: $850,000; Format: 32MS/32WS/32MD/32WD/32XD	Score: 21–14, 10–21, 21–18	
23 October	French Open (Draw): Host: Rennes, France; Venue: Glaz Arena; Level: Super 750; Prize: $850,000; Format: 32MS/32WS/32MD/32WD/32XD	(China) Liu Shengshu (China) Tan Ning	(Thailand) Jongkolphan Kititharakul (Thailand) Rawinda Prajongjai
23 October	French Open (Draw): Host: Rennes, France; Venue: Glaz Arena; Level: Super 750; Prize: $850,000; Format: 32MS/32WS/32MD/32WD/32XD	Score: 26–24, 21–19	
23 October	French Open (Draw): Host: Rennes, France; Venue: Glaz Arena; Level: Super 750; Prize: $850,000; Format: 32MS/32WS/32MD/32WD/32XD	(China) Jiang Zhenbang (China) Wei Yaxin	(Hong Kong) Tang Chun Man (Hong Kong) Tse Ying Suet
23 October	French Open (Draw): Host: Rennes, France; Venue: Glaz Arena; Level: Super 750; Prize: $850,000; Format: 32MS/32WS/32MD/32WD/32XD	Score: 21–17, 15–21, 21–12	
23 October	Indonesia Masters Super 100 II (Draw): Host: Surabaya, East Java, Indonesia; Venue: Jatim International Expo Convention Exhibition; Level: Super 100; Prize: $100,000; Format: 48MS/32WS/32MD/32WD/32XD	(Japan) Takuma Obayashi	(South Korea) Choi Ji-hoon
23 October	Indonesia Masters Super 100 II (Draw): Host: Surabaya, East Java, Indonesia; Venue: Jatim International Expo Convention Exhibition; Level: Super 100; Prize: $100,000; Format: 48MS/32WS/32MD/32WD/32XD	Score: 21–8, 21–19	
23 October	Indonesia Masters Super 100 II (Draw): Host: Surabaya, East Java, Indonesia; Venue: Jatim International Expo Convention Exhibition; Level: Super 100; Prize: $100,000; Format: 48MS/32WS/32MD/32WD/32XD	(Japan) Tomoka Miyazaki	(Thailand) Pornpicha Choeikeewong
23 October	Indonesia Masters Super 100 II (Draw): Host: Surabaya, East Java, Indonesia; Venue: Jatim International Expo Convention Exhibition; Level: Super 100; Prize: $100,000; Format: 48MS/32WS/32MD/32WD/32XD	Score: 21–9, 21–15	
23 October	Indonesia Masters Super 100 II (Draw): Host: Surabaya, East Java, Indonesia; Venue: Jatim International Expo Convention Exhibition; Level: Super 100; Prize: $100,000; Format: 48MS/32WS/32MD/32WD/32XD	(Japan) Kenya Mitsuhashi (Japan) Hiroki Okamura	(Malaysia) Choong Hon Jian (Malaysia) Muhammad Haikal
23 October	Indonesia Masters Super 100 II (Draw): Host: Surabaya, East Java, Indonesia; Venue: Jatim International Expo Convention Exhibition; Level: Super 100; Prize: $100,000; Format: 48MS/32WS/32MD/32WD/32XD	Score: 21–16, 21–18	
23 October	Indonesia Masters Super 100 II (Draw): Host: Surabaya, East Java, Indonesia; Venue: Jatim International Expo Convention Exhibition; Level: Super 100; Prize: $100,000; Format: 48MS/32WS/32MD/32WD/32XD	(Indonesia) Lanny Tria Mayasari (Indonesia) Ribka Sugiarto	(Indonesia) Meilysa Trias Puspita Sari (Indonesia) Rachel Allessya Rose
23 October	Indonesia Masters Super 100 II (Draw): Host: Surabaya, East Java, Indonesia; Venue: Jatim International Expo Convention Exhibition; Level: Super 100; Prize: $100,000; Format: 48MS/32WS/32MD/32WD/32XD	Score: 21–12, 21–16	
23 October	Indonesia Masters Super 100 II (Draw): Host: Surabaya, East Java, Indonesia; Venue: Jatim International Expo Convention Exhibition; Level: Super 100; Prize: $100,000; Format: 48MS/32WS/32MD/32WD/32XD	(Indonesia) Jafar Hidayatullah (Indonesia) Aisyah Salsabila Putri Pranata	(Thailand) Ruttanapak Oupthong (Thailand) Jhenicha Sudjaipraparat
23 October	Indonesia Masters Super 100 II (Draw): Host: Surabaya, East Java, Indonesia; Venue: Jatim International Expo Convention Exhibition; Level: Super 100; Prize: $100,000; Format: 48MS/32WS/32MD/32WD/32XD	Score: 21–17, 21–19	
23 October	North Harbour International (cancelled): Host: Auckland, New Zealand; Venue: Badminton North Harbour Centre; Level: International Challenge; Prize: $15,000; Format: 32MS/32WS/32MD/32WD/32XD		
23 October	North Harbour International (cancelled): Host: Auckland, New Zealand; Venue: Badminton North Harbour Centre; Level: International Challenge; Prize: $15,000; Format: 32MS/32WS/32MD/32WD/32XD	Score:	
23 October	North Harbour International (cancelled): Host: Auckland, New Zealand; Venue: Badminton North Harbour Centre; Level: International Challenge; Prize: $15,000; Format: 32MS/32WS/32MD/32WD/32XD	Score:	
23 October	North Harbour International (cancelled): Host: Auckland, New Zealand; Venue: Badminton North Harbour Centre; Level: International Challenge; Prize: $15,000; Format: 32MS/32WS/32MD/32WD/32XD	Score:	
23 October	North Harbour International (cancelled): Host: Auckland, New Zealand; Venue: Badminton North Harbour Centre; Level: International Challenge; Prize: $15,000; Format: 32MS/32WS/32MD/32WD/32XD	Score:	
23 October	North Harbour International (cancelled): Host: Auckland, New Zealand; Venue: Badminton North Harbour Centre; Level: International Challenge; Prize: $15,000; Format: 32MS/32WS/32MD/32WD/32XD	Score:	
23 October	India International (Bengaluru): Host: Bengaluru, India; Venue: Prakash Padukone Badminton Academy; Level: International Challenge; Prize: $25,000; Format: 64MS/64WS/32MD/32WD/32XD	(India) Sathish Kumar Karunakaran	(India) Ravi
23 October	India International (Bengaluru): Host: Bengaluru, India; Venue: Prakash Padukone Badminton Academy; Level: International Challenge; Prize: $25,000; Format: 64MS/64WS/32MD/32WD/32XD	Score: 21–14, 21–16	
23 October	India International (Bengaluru): Host: Bengaluru, India; Venue: Prakash Padukone Badminton Academy; Level: International Challenge; Prize: $25,000; Format: 64MS/64WS/32MD/32WD/32XD	(India) Isharani Baruah	(India) Unnati Hooda
23 October	India International (Bengaluru): Host: Bengaluru, India; Venue: Prakash Padukone Badminton Academy; Level: International Challenge; Prize: $25,000; Format: 64MS/64WS/32MD/32WD/32XD	Score: 13–21, 21–19, 21–11	
23 October	India International (Bengaluru): Host: Bengaluru, India; Venue: Prakash Padukone Badminton Academy; Level: International Challenge; Prize: $25,000; Format: 64MS/64WS/32MD/32WD/32XD	(India) Hariharan Amsakarunan (India) Ruban Kumar Rethinasabapathi	(India) Shyam Prasad (India) Subramanian Sunjith
23 October	India International (Bengaluru): Host: Bengaluru, India; Venue: Prakash Padukone Badminton Academy; Level: International Challenge; Prize: $25,000; Format: 64MS/64WS/32MD/32WD/32XD	Score: 21–13, 21–14	
23 October	India International (Bengaluru): Host: Bengaluru, India; Venue: Prakash Padukone Badminton Academy; Level: International Challenge; Prize: $25,000; Format: 64MS/64WS/32MD/32WD/32XD	(Japan) Miku Shigeta (Japan) Maya Taguchi	(India) Priya Konjengbam (India) Shruti Mishra
23 October	India International (Bengaluru): Host: Bengaluru, India; Venue: Prakash Padukone Badminton Academy; Level: International Challenge; Prize: $25,000; Format: 64MS/64WS/32MD/32WD/32XD	Score: 17–21, 21–18, 21–15	
23 October	India International (Bengaluru): Host: Bengaluru, India; Venue: Prakash Padukone Badminton Academy; Level: International Challenge; Prize: $25,000; Format: 64MS/64WS/32MD/32WD/32XD	(Thailand) Phatharathorn Nipornram (Thailand) Nattamon Laisuan	(India) Sathish Kumar Karunakaran (India) Aadya Variyath
23 October	India International (Bengaluru): Host: Bengaluru, India; Venue: Prakash Padukone Badminton Academy; Level: International Challenge; Prize: $25,000; Format: 64MS/64WS/32MD/32WD/32XD	Score: 21–23, 21–17, 22–20	
23 October	Israel Open (cancelled): Host: Hatzor, Israel; Venue: Kibbutz Hatzor Sport Hall; Level: Future Series; Format: 32MS/32WS/32MD/16WD/32XD		
23 October	Israel Open (cancelled): Host: Hatzor, Israel; Venue: Kibbutz Hatzor Sport Hall; Level: Future Series; Format: 32MS/32WS/32MD/16WD/32XD	Score:	
23 October	Israel Open (cancelled): Host: Hatzor, Israel; Venue: Kibbutz Hatzor Sport Hall; Level: Future Series; Format: 32MS/32WS/32MD/16WD/32XD	Score:	
23 October	Israel Open (cancelled): Host: Hatzor, Israel; Venue: Kibbutz Hatzor Sport Hall; Level: Future Series; Format: 32MS/32WS/32MD/16WD/32XD	Score:	
23 October	Israel Open (cancelled): Host: Hatzor, Israel; Venue: Kibbutz Hatzor Sport Hall; Level: Future Series; Format: 32MS/32WS/32MD/16WD/32XD	Score:	
23 October	Israel Open (cancelled): Host: Hatzor, Israel; Venue: Kibbutz Hatzor Sport Hall; Level: Future Series; Format: 32MS/32WS/32MD/16WD/32XD	Score:	
23 October	Dominican Open (cancelled): Host: San Pedro de Macorís, Dominican Republic; Venue: Polideportivo Rolando Ramirez; Level: Future Series; Format: 32MS/32WS/32MD/16WD/32XD		
23 October	Dominican Open (cancelled): Host: San Pedro de Macorís, Dominican Republic; Venue: Polideportivo Rolando Ramirez; Level: Future Series; Format: 32MS/32WS/32MD/16WD/32XD	Score:	
23 October	Dominican Open (cancelled): Host: San Pedro de Macorís, Dominican Republic; Venue: Polideportivo Rolando Ramirez; Level: Future Series; Format: 32MS/32WS/32MD/16WD/32XD	Score:	
23 October	Dominican Open (cancelled): Host: San Pedro de Macorís, Dominican Republic; Venue: Polideportivo Rolando Ramirez; Level: Future Series; Format: 32MS/32WS/32MD/16WD/32XD	Score:	
23 October	Dominican Open (cancelled): Host: San Pedro de Macorís, Dominican Republic; Venue: Polideportivo Rolando Ramirez; Level: Future Series; Format: 32MS/32WS/32MD/16WD/32XD	Score:	
23 October	Dominican Open (cancelled): Host: San Pedro de Macorís, Dominican Republic; Venue: Polideportivo Rolando Ramirez; Level: Future Series; Format: 32MS/32WS/32MD/16WD/32XD	Score:	
30 October	Hylo Open (Draw): Host: Saarbrücken, Germany; Venue: Saarlandhalle; Level: Super 300; Prize: $210,000; Format: 32MS/32WS/32MD/32WD/32XD	(Chinese Taipei) Chou Tien-chen	(Hong Kong) Lee Cheuk Yiu
30 October	Hylo Open (Draw): Host: Saarbrücken, Germany; Venue: Saarlandhalle; Level: Super 300; Prize: $210,000; Format: 32MS/32WS/32MD/32WD/32XD	Score: 21–23, 21–17, 21–10	
30 October	Hylo Open (Draw): Host: Saarbrücken, Germany; Venue: Saarlandhalle; Level: Super 300; Prize: $210,000; Format: 32MS/32WS/32MD/32WD/32XD	(United States) Beiwen Zhang	(Denmark) Line Kjærsfeldt
30 October	Hylo Open (Draw): Host: Saarbrücken, Germany; Venue: Saarlandhalle; Level: Super 300; Prize: $210,000; Format: 32MS/32WS/32MD/32WD/32XD	Score: 21–18, 16–21, 21–16	
30 October	Hylo Open (Draw): Host: Saarbrücken, Germany; Venue: Saarlandhalle; Level: Super 300; Prize: $210,000; Format: 32MS/32WS/32MD/32WD/32XD	(China) Liu Yuchen (China) Ou Xuanyi	(Chinese Taipei) Lee Yang (Chinese Taipei) Wang Chi-lin
30 October	Hylo Open (Draw): Host: Saarbrücken, Germany; Venue: Saarlandhalle; Level: Super 300; Prize: $210,000; Format: 32MS/32WS/32MD/32WD/32XD	Score: 24–22, 21–13	
30 October	Hylo Open (Draw): Host: Saarbrücken, Germany; Venue: Saarlandhalle; Level: Super 300; Prize: $210,000; Format: 32MS/32WS/32MD/32WD/32XD	(China) Zhang Shuxian (China) Zheng Yu	(Indonesia) Apriyani Rahayu (Indonesia) Siti Fadia Silva Ramadhanti
30 October	Hylo Open (Draw): Host: Saarbrücken, Germany; Venue: Saarlandhalle; Level: Super 300; Prize: $210,000; Format: 32MS/32WS/32MD/32WD/32XD	Score: 18–21, 1–1^{r}	
30 October	Hylo Open (Draw): Host: Saarbrücken, Germany; Venue: Saarlandhalle; Level: Super 300; Prize: $210,000; Format: 32MS/32WS/32MD/32WD/32XD	(Hong Kong) Tang Chun Man (Hong Kong) Tse Ying Suet	(Indonesia) Rehan Naufal Kusharjanto (Indonesia) Lisa Ayu Kusumawati
30 October	Hylo Open (Draw): Host: Saarbrücken, Germany; Venue: Saarlandhalle; Level: Super 300; Prize: $210,000; Format: 32MS/32WS/32MD/32WD/32XD	Score: 15–21, 21–15, 21–14	
30 October	Malaysia Super 100 (Draw): Host: Kuala Lumpur, Malaysia; Venue: Titiwangsa Stadium; Level: Super 100; Prize: $100,000; Format: 48MS/32WS/32MD/32WD/32XD	(Malaysia) Leong Jun Hao	(Chinese Taipei) Lee Chia-hao
30 October	Malaysia Super 100 (Draw): Host: Kuala Lumpur, Malaysia; Venue: Titiwangsa Stadium; Level: Super 100; Prize: $100,000; Format: 48MS/32WS/32MD/32WD/32XD	Score: 22–20, 21–13	
30 October	Malaysia Super 100 (Draw): Host: Kuala Lumpur, Malaysia; Venue: Titiwangsa Stadium; Level: Super 100; Prize: $100,000; Format: 48MS/32WS/32MD/32WD/32XD	(Thailand) Pitchamon Opatniputh	(South Korea) Kim Joo-eun
30 October	Malaysia Super 100 (Draw): Host: Kuala Lumpur, Malaysia; Venue: Titiwangsa Stadium; Level: Super 100; Prize: $100,000; Format: 48MS/32WS/32MD/32WD/32XD	Score: 21–12, 24–22	
30 October	Malaysia Super 100 (Draw): Host: Kuala Lumpur, Malaysia; Venue: Titiwangsa Stadium; Level: Super 100; Prize: $100,000; Format: 48MS/32WS/32MD/32WD/32XD	(Chinese Taipei) Chen Cheng-kuan (Chinese Taipei) Chen Sheng-fa	(Malaysia) Low Hang Yee (Malaysia) Ng Eng Cheong
30 October	Malaysia Super 100 (Draw): Host: Kuala Lumpur, Malaysia; Venue: Titiwangsa Stadium; Level: Super 100; Prize: $100,000; Format: 48MS/32WS/32MD/32WD/32XD	Score: 23–21, 21–17	
30 October	Malaysia Super 100 (Draw): Host: Kuala Lumpur, Malaysia; Venue: Titiwangsa Stadium; Level: Super 100; Prize: $100,000; Format: 48MS/32WS/32MD/32WD/32XD	(Thailand) Laksika Kanlaha (Thailand) Phataimas Muenwong	(Hong Kong) Lui Lok Lok (Hong Kong) Ng Wing Yung
30 October	Malaysia Super 100 (Draw): Host: Kuala Lumpur, Malaysia; Venue: Titiwangsa Stadium; Level: Super 100; Prize: $100,000; Format: 48MS/32WS/32MD/32WD/32XD	Score: 16–21, 21–16, 21–16	
30 October	Malaysia Super 100 (Draw): Host: Kuala Lumpur, Malaysia; Venue: Titiwangsa Stadium; Level: Super 100; Prize: $100,000; Format: 48MS/32WS/32MD/32WD/32XD	(Malaysia) Chan Peng Soon (Malaysia) Cheah Yee See	(Thailand) Pakkapon Teeraratsakul (Thailand) Phataimas Muenwong
30 October	Malaysia Super 100 (Draw): Host: Kuala Lumpur, Malaysia; Venue: Titiwangsa Stadium; Level: Super 100; Prize: $100,000; Format: 48MS/32WS/32MD/32WD/32XD	Score: 21–9, 17–21, 21–10	
30 October	India International (Raipur): Host: Raipur, India; Venue: Isportz Badminton Arena; Level: International Challenge; Prize: $15,000; Format: 64MS/64WS/32MD/32WD/32XD	(India) Sathish Kumar Karunakaran	(India) Ravi
30 October	India International (Raipur): Host: Raipur, India; Venue: Isportz Badminton Arena; Level: International Challenge; Prize: $15,000; Format: 64MS/64WS/32MD/32WD/32XD	Score: 24–22, 21–7	
30 October	India International (Raipur): Host: Raipur, India; Venue: Isportz Badminton Arena; Level: International Challenge; Prize: $15,000; Format: 64MS/64WS/32MD/32WD/32XD	(India) Unnati Hooda	(India) Tasnim Mir
30 October	India International (Raipur): Host: Raipur, India; Venue: Isportz Badminton Arena; Level: International Challenge; Prize: $15,000; Format: 64MS/64WS/32MD/32WD/32XD	Score: 21–18, 21–10	
30 October	India International (Raipur): Host: Raipur, India; Venue: Isportz Badminton Arena; Level: International Challenge; Prize: $15,000; Format: 64MS/64WS/32MD/32WD/32XD	(Thailand) Chaloempon Charoenkitamorn (Thailand) Thanawin Madee	(Thailand) Sirawit Sothon (Thailand) Natthapat Trinkajee
30 October	India International (Raipur): Host: Raipur, India; Venue: Isportz Badminton Arena; Level: International Challenge; Prize: $15,000; Format: 64MS/64WS/32MD/32WD/32XD	Score: 21–17, 21–17	
30 October	India International (Raipur): Host: Raipur, India; Venue: Isportz Badminton Arena; Level: International Challenge; Prize: $15,000; Format: 64MS/64WS/32MD/32WD/32XD	(Thailand) Tidapron Kleebyeesun (Thailand) Nattamon Laisuan	(India) K. Ashwini Bhat (India) Shikha Gautam
30 October	India International (Raipur): Host: Raipur, India; Venue: Isportz Badminton Arena; Level: International Challenge; Prize: $15,000; Format: 64MS/64WS/32MD/32WD/32XD	Score: 21–14, 21–14	
30 October	India International (Raipur): Host: Raipur, India; Venue: Isportz Badminton Arena; Level: International Challenge; Prize: $15,000; Format: 64MS/64WS/32MD/32WD/32XD	(India) Sathish Kumar Karunakaran (India) Aadya Variyath	(India) Dingku Singh Konthoujam (India) Priya Konjengbam
30 October	India International (Raipur): Host: Raipur, India; Venue: Isportz Badminton Arena; Level: International Challenge; Prize: $15,000; Format: 64MS/64WS/32MD/32WD/32XD	Score: 21–10, 21–18	
30 October	Hungarian International: Host: Budapest, Hungary; Venue: Sterbinszky Hall; Level: International Series; Prize: $5,000; Format: 64MS/32WS/32MD/32WD/32XD	(England) Harry Huang	(Denmark) Karan Rajan Rajarajan
30 October	Hungarian International: Host: Budapest, Hungary; Venue: Sterbinszky Hall; Level: International Series; Prize: $5,000; Format: 64MS/32WS/32MD/32WD/32XD	Score: 21–18, 21–16	
30 October	Hungarian International: Host: Budapest, Hungary; Venue: Sterbinszky Hall; Level: International Series; Prize: $5,000; Format: 64MS/32WS/32MD/32WD/32XD	(Denmark) Frederikke Lund	(Hungary) Ágnes Kőrösi
30 October	Hungarian International: Host: Budapest, Hungary; Venue: Sterbinszky Hall; Level: International Series; Prize: $5,000; Format: 64MS/32WS/32MD/32WD/32XD	Score: 21–18, 21–16	
30 October	Hungarian International: Host: Budapest, Hungary; Venue: Sterbinszky Hall; Level: International Series; Prize: $5,000; Format: 64MS/32WS/32MD/32WD/32XD	(Denmark) Rasmus Espersen (Denmark) Marcus Rindshøj	(England) Alex Green (England) Brandon Yap
30 October	Hungarian International: Host: Budapest, Hungary; Venue: Sterbinszky Hall; Level: International Series; Prize: $5,000; Format: 64MS/32WS/32MD/32WD/32XD	Score: 23–21, 19–21, 21–15	
30 October	Hungarian International: Host: Budapest, Hungary; Venue: Sterbinszky Hall; Level: International Series; Prize: $5,000; Format: 64MS/32WS/32MD/32WD/32XD	(Spain) Paula López (Spain) Lucía Rodríguez	(Canada) Jackie Dent (Canada) Crystal Lai
30 October	Hungarian International: Host: Budapest, Hungary; Venue: Sterbinszky Hall; Level: International Series; Prize: $5,000; Format: 64MS/32WS/32MD/32WD/32XD	Score: 22–20, 21–15	
30 October	Hungarian International: Host: Budapest, Hungary; Venue: Sterbinszky Hall; Level: International Series; Prize: $5,000; Format: 64MS/32WS/32MD/32WD/32XD	(Denmark) Rasmus Espersen (Denmark) Amalie Cecilie Kudsk	(Spain) Rubén García (Spain) Lucía Rodríguez
30 October	Hungarian International: Host: Budapest, Hungary; Venue: Sterbinszky Hall; Level: International Series; Prize: $5,000; Format: 64MS/32WS/32MD/32WD/32XD	Score: 21–18, 14–21, 21–18	

=== November ===
Date	Tournament	Champions	Runners-up
6 November	Korea Masters (Draw): Host: Gwangju, South Korea; Venue: Gwangju Women's University Stadium; Level: Super 300; Prize: $210,000; Format: 32MS/32WS/32MD/32WD/32XD	(Japan) Kento Momota	(Japan) Koki Watanabe
6 November	Korea Masters (Draw): Host: Gwangju, South Korea; Venue: Gwangju Women's University Stadium; Level: Super 300; Prize: $210,000; Format: 32MS/32WS/32MD/32WD/32XD	Score: 21–16, 21–15	
6 November	Korea Masters (Draw): Host: Gwangju, South Korea; Venue: Gwangju Women's University Stadium; Level: Super 300; Prize: $210,000; Format: 32MS/32WS/32MD/32WD/32XD	(South Korea) Kim Ga-eun	(Japan) Tomoka Miyazaki
6 November	Korea Masters (Draw): Host: Gwangju, South Korea; Venue: Gwangju Women's University Stadium; Level: Super 300; Prize: $210,000; Format: 32MS/32WS/32MD/32WD/32XD	Score: 19–21, 21–17, 21–12	
6 November	Korea Masters (Draw): Host: Gwangju, South Korea; Venue: Gwangju Women's University Stadium; Level: Super 300; Prize: $210,000; Format: 32MS/32WS/32MD/32WD/32XD	(Chinese Taipei) Lee Jhe-huei (Chinese Taipei) Yang Po-hsuan	(Chinese Taipei) Lee Yang (Chinese Taipei) Wang Chi-lin
6 November	Korea Masters (Draw): Host: Gwangju, South Korea; Venue: Gwangju Women's University Stadium; Level: Super 300; Prize: $210,000; Format: 32MS/32WS/32MD/32WD/32XD	Score: 21–17, 21–19	
6 November	Korea Masters (Draw): Host: Gwangju, South Korea; Venue: Gwangju Women's University Stadium; Level: Super 300; Prize: $210,000; Format: 32MS/32WS/32MD/32WD/32XD	(South Korea) Jeong Na-eun (South Korea) Kim Hye-jeong	(Japan) Rui Hirokami (Japan) Yuna Kato
6 November	Korea Masters (Draw): Host: Gwangju, South Korea; Venue: Gwangju Women's University Stadium; Level: Super 300; Prize: $210,000; Format: 32MS/32WS/32MD/32WD/32XD	Score: 21–12, 21–19	
6 November	Korea Masters (Draw): Host: Gwangju, South Korea; Venue: Gwangju Women's University Stadium; Level: Super 300; Prize: $210,000; Format: 32MS/32WS/32MD/32WD/32XD	(South Korea) Seo Seung-jae (South Korea) Chae Yoo-jung	(China) Jiang Zhenbang (China) Wei Yaxin
6 November	Korea Masters (Draw): Host: Gwangju, South Korea; Venue: Gwangju Women's University Stadium; Level: Super 300; Prize: $210,000; Format: 32MS/32WS/32MD/32WD/32XD	Score: 21–14, 21–15	
6 November	Vietnam International: Host: Ninh Bình, Vietnam; Venue: Ninh Binh Sports Stadium; Level: International Series; Prize: $5,000; Format: 64MS/32WS/32MD/32WD/32XD	(China) Liu Liang	(China) Wang Zhengxing
6 November	Vietnam International: Host: Ninh Bình, Vietnam; Venue: Ninh Binh Sports Stadium; Level: International Series; Prize: $5,000; Format: 64MS/32WS/32MD/32WD/32XD	Score: 21–19, 12–21, 21–12	
6 November	Vietnam International: Host: Ninh Bình, Vietnam; Venue: Ninh Binh Sports Stadium; Level: International Series; Prize: $5,000; Format: 64MS/32WS/32MD/32WD/32XD	(China) Wu Luoyu	(Japan) Sorano Yoshikawa
6 November	Vietnam International: Host: Ninh Bình, Vietnam; Venue: Ninh Binh Sports Stadium; Level: International Series; Prize: $5,000; Format: 64MS/32WS/32MD/32WD/32XD	Score: 21–19, 21–14	
6 November	Vietnam International: Host: Ninh Bình, Vietnam; Venue: Ninh Binh Sports Stadium; Level: International Series; Prize: $5,000; Format: 64MS/32WS/32MD/32WD/32XD	(China) Xie Haonan (China) Zeng Weihan	(China) Cui Hechen (China) Sun Wenjun
6 November	Vietnam International: Host: Ninh Bình, Vietnam; Venue: Ninh Binh Sports Stadium; Level: International Series; Prize: $5,000; Format: 64MS/32WS/32MD/32WD/32XD	Score: 21–13, 21–10	
6 November	Vietnam International: Host: Ninh Bình, Vietnam; Venue: Ninh Binh Sports Stadium; Level: International Series; Prize: $5,000; Format: 64MS/32WS/32MD/32WD/32XD	(Japan) Kaho Osawa (Japan) Asuka Sugiyama	(Japan) Tsukiko Yasaki (Japan) Sorano Yoshikawa
6 November	Vietnam International: Host: Ninh Bình, Vietnam; Venue: Ninh Binh Sports Stadium; Level: International Series; Prize: $5,000; Format: 64MS/32WS/32MD/32WD/32XD	Score: 19–21, 21–18, 21–10	
6 November	Vietnam International: Host: Ninh Bình, Vietnam; Venue: Ninh Binh Sports Stadium; Level: International Series; Prize: $5,000; Format: 64MS/32WS/32MD/32WD/32XD	(China) Zhou Zhihong (China) Yang Jiayi	(Vietnam) Phạm Văn Hai (Vietnam) Thân Vân Anh
6 November	Vietnam International: Host: Ninh Bình, Vietnam; Venue: Ninh Binh Sports Stadium; Level: International Series; Prize: $5,000; Format: 64MS/32WS/32MD/32WD/32XD	Score: 21–19, 21–9	
6 November	Norwegian International: Host: Sandefjord, Norway; Venue: Jotunhallen; Level: International Series; Prize: $5,000; Format: 32MS/32WS/32MD/32WD/32XD	(Indonesia) Andi Fadel Muhammad	(Denmark) Jakob Houe
6 November	Norwegian International: Host: Sandefjord, Norway; Venue: Jotunhallen; Level: International Series; Prize: $5,000; Format: 32MS/32WS/32MD/32WD/32XD	Score: 21–19, 21–19	
6 November	Norwegian International: Host: Sandefjord, Norway; Venue: Jotunhallen; Level: International Series; Prize: $5,000; Format: 32MS/32WS/32MD/32WD/32XD	(Canada) Talia Ng	(Denmark) Irina Amalie Andersen
6 November	Norwegian International: Host: Sandefjord, Norway; Venue: Jotunhallen; Level: International Series; Prize: $5,000; Format: 32MS/32WS/32MD/32WD/32XD	Score: 21–10, 12–21, 21–17	
6 November	Norwegian International: Host: Sandefjord, Norway; Venue: Jotunhallen; Level: International Series; Prize: $5,000; Format: 32MS/32WS/32MD/32WD/32XD	(France) Maël Cattoen (France) Lucas Renoir	(Norway) Torjus Flaatten (Norway) Vegard Rikheim
6 November	Norwegian International: Host: Sandefjord, Norway; Venue: Jotunhallen; Level: International Series; Prize: $5,000; Format: 32MS/32WS/32MD/32WD/32XD	Score: 21–17, 19–21, 21–17	
6 November	Norwegian International: Host: Sandefjord, Norway; Venue: Jotunhallen; Level: International Series; Prize: $5,000; Format: 32MS/32WS/32MD/32WD/32XD	(Denmark) Amalie Cecilie Kudsk (Denmark) Signe Schulz	(Estonia) Kati-Kreet Marran (Estonia) Helina Rüütel
6 November	Norwegian International: Host: Sandefjord, Norway; Venue: Jotunhallen; Level: International Series; Prize: $5,000; Format: 32MS/32WS/32MD/32WD/32XD	Score: 21–16, 21–19	
6 November	Norwegian International: Host: Sandefjord, Norway; Venue: Jotunhallen; Level: International Series; Prize: $5,000; Format: 32MS/32WS/32MD/32WD/32XD	(Poland) Robert Cybulski (Poland) Kornelia Marczak	(Sweden) Jacob Ekman (Sweden) Nathalie Wang
6 November	Norwegian International: Host: Sandefjord, Norway; Venue: Jotunhallen; Level: International Series; Prize: $5,000; Format: 32MS/32WS/32MD/32WD/32XD	Score: 21–18, 22–20	
6 November	Guatemala International: Host: Guatemala City, Guatemala; Venue: Teodoro Palacios Flores; Level: International Series; Prize: $5,000; Format: 32MS/32WS/16MD/8WD/16XD	(Guatemala) Kevin Cordón	(Italy) Giovanni Toti
6 November	Guatemala International: Host: Guatemala City, Guatemala; Venue: Teodoro Palacios Flores; Level: International Series; Prize: $5,000; Format: 32MS/32WS/16MD/8WD/16XD	Score: 21–8, 21–19	
6 November	Guatemala International: Host: Guatemala City, Guatemala; Venue: Teodoro Palacios Flores; Level: International Series; Prize: $5,000; Format: 32MS/32WS/16MD/8WD/16XD	(United States) Ishika Jaiswal	(Canada) Nong Sophia
6 November	Guatemala International: Host: Guatemala City, Guatemala; Venue: Teodoro Palacios Flores; Level: International Series; Prize: $5,000; Format: 32MS/32WS/16MD/8WD/16XD	Score: 21–19, 21–9	
6 November	Guatemala International: Host: Guatemala City, Guatemala; Venue: Teodoro Palacios Flores; Level: International Series; Prize: $5,000; Format: 32MS/32WS/16MD/8WD/16XD	(Mexico) Job Castillo (Mexico) Luis Montoya	(Algeria) Koceila Mammeri (Algeria) Youcef Sabri Medel
6 November	Guatemala International: Host: Guatemala City, Guatemala; Venue: Teodoro Palacios Flores; Level: International Series; Prize: $5,000; Format: 32MS/32WS/16MD/8WD/16XD	Score: 21–18, 21–17	
6 November	Guatemala International: Host: Guatemala City, Guatemala; Venue: Teodoro Palacios Flores; Level: International Series; Prize: $5,000; Format: 32MS/32WS/16MD/8WD/16XD	(Guatemala) Diana Corleto (Guatemala) Nikté Sotomayor	(Canada) Jackie Dent (Canada) Crystal Lai
6 November	Guatemala International: Host: Guatemala City, Guatemala; Venue: Teodoro Palacios Flores; Level: International Series; Prize: $5,000; Format: 32MS/32WS/16MD/8WD/16XD	Score: 21–18, 17–21, 21–17	
6 November	Guatemala International: Host: Guatemala City, Guatemala; Venue: Teodoro Palacios Flores; Level: International Series; Prize: $5,000; Format: 32MS/32WS/16MD/8WD/16XD	(Algeria) Koceila Mammeri (Algeria) Tanina Mammeri	(Mexico) Luis Montoya (Mexico) Miriam Rodríguez
6 November	Guatemala International: Host: Guatemala City, Guatemala; Venue: Teodoro Palacios Flores; Level: International Series; Prize: $5,000; Format: 32MS/32WS/16MD/8WD/16XD	Score: 21–17, 16–21, 21–19	
13 November	Japan Masters (Draw): Host: Kumamoto, Japan; Venue: Kumamoto Prefectural Gymnasium; Level: Super 500; Prize: $420,000; Format: 32MS/32WS/32MD/32WD/32XD	(Denmark) Viktor Axelsen	(China) Shi Yuqi
13 November	Japan Masters (Draw): Host: Kumamoto, Japan; Venue: Kumamoto Prefectural Gymnasium; Level: Super 500; Prize: $420,000; Format: 32MS/32WS/32MD/32WD/32XD	Score: 22–20, 21–17	
13 November	Japan Masters (Draw): Host: Kumamoto, Japan; Venue: Kumamoto Prefectural Gymnasium; Level: Super 500; Prize: $420,000; Format: 32MS/32WS/32MD/32WD/32XD	(Indonesia) Gregoria Mariska Tunjung	(China) Chen Yufei
13 November	Japan Masters (Draw): Host: Kumamoto, Japan; Venue: Kumamoto Prefectural Gymnasium; Level: Super 500; Prize: $420,000; Format: 32MS/32WS/32MD/32WD/32XD	Score: 21–12, 21–12	
13 November	Japan Masters (Draw): Host: Kumamoto, Japan; Venue: Kumamoto Prefectural Gymnasium; Level: Super 500; Prize: $420,000; Format: 32MS/32WS/32MD/32WD/32XD	(China) He Jiting (China) Ren Xiangyu	(China) Liu Yuchen (China) Ou Xuanyi
13 November	Japan Masters (Draw): Host: Kumamoto, Japan; Venue: Kumamoto Prefectural Gymnasium; Level: Super 500; Prize: $420,000; Format: 32MS/32WS/32MD/32WD/32XD	Score: 21–14, 15–21, 21–15	
13 November	Japan Masters (Draw): Host: Kumamoto, Japan; Venue: Kumamoto Prefectural Gymnasium; Level: Super 500; Prize: $420,000; Format: 32MS/32WS/32MD/32WD/32XD	(China) Zhang Shuxian (China) Zheng Yu	(China) Liu Shengshu (China) Tan Ning
13 November	Japan Masters (Draw): Host: Kumamoto, Japan; Venue: Kumamoto Prefectural Gymnasium; Level: Super 500; Prize: $420,000; Format: 32MS/32WS/32MD/32WD/32XD	Score: 12–21, 21–12, 21–17	
13 November	Japan Masters (Draw): Host: Kumamoto, Japan; Venue: Kumamoto Prefectural Gymnasium; Level: Super 500; Prize: $420,000; Format: 32MS/32WS/32MD/32WD/32XD	(China) Zheng Siwei (China) Huang Yaqiong	(China) Feng Yanzhe (China) Huang Dongping
13 November	Japan Masters (Draw): Host: Kumamoto, Japan; Venue: Kumamoto Prefectural Gymnasium; Level: Super 500; Prize: $420,000; Format: 32MS/32WS/32MD/32WD/32XD	Score: 25–23, 21–9	
13 November	Malaysia International: Host: Ipoh, Malaysia; Venue: Arena Badminton Perak; Level: International Challenge; Prize: $25,000; Format: 64MS/32WS/32MD/32WD/32XD	(Japan) Minoru Koga	(Japan) Takuma Kawamoto
13 November	Malaysia International: Host: Ipoh, Malaysia; Venue: Arena Badminton Perak; Level: International Challenge; Prize: $25,000; Format: 64MS/32WS/32MD/32WD/32XD	Score: 21–17, 10–21, 21–11	
13 November	Malaysia International: Host: Ipoh, Malaysia; Venue: Arena Badminton Perak; Level: International Challenge; Prize: $25,000; Format: 64MS/32WS/32MD/32WD/32XD	(Japan) Miho Kayama	(Malaysia) Wong Ling Ching
13 November	Malaysia International: Host: Ipoh, Malaysia; Venue: Arena Badminton Perak; Level: International Challenge; Prize: $25,000; Format: 64MS/32WS/32MD/32WD/32XD	Score: 23–21, 21–16	
13 November	Malaysia International: Host: Ipoh, Malaysia; Venue: Arena Badminton Perak; Level: International Challenge; Prize: $25,000; Format: 64MS/32WS/32MD/32WD/32XD	(Japan) Takuto Inoue (Japan) Masayuki Onodera	(Malaysia) Fazriq Razif (Malaysia) Wong Vin Sean
13 November	Malaysia International: Host: Ipoh, Malaysia; Venue: Arena Badminton Perak; Level: International Challenge; Prize: $25,000; Format: 64MS/32WS/32MD/32WD/32XD	Score: 21–16, 18–21, 21–15	
13 November	Malaysia International: Host: Ipoh, Malaysia; Venue: Arena Badminton Perak; Level: International Challenge; Prize: $25,000; Format: 64MS/32WS/32MD/32WD/32XD	(Chinese Taipei) Lin Chih-chun (Chinese Taipei) Sung Yu-hsuan	(Malaysia) Ng Qi Xuan (Malaysia) Yap Yee
13 November	Malaysia International: Host: Ipoh, Malaysia; Venue: Arena Badminton Perak; Level: International Challenge; Prize: $25,000; Format: 64MS/32WS/32MD/32WD/32XD	Score: 21–11, 21–18	
13 November	Malaysia International: Host: Ipoh, Malaysia; Venue: Arena Badminton Perak; Level: International Challenge; Prize: $25,000; Format: 64MS/32WS/32MD/32WD/32XD	(Malaysia) Hoo Pang Ron (Malaysia) Cheng Su Yin	(Chinese Taipei) Lin Yu-chieh (Chinese Taipei) Hsu Yin-hui
13 November	Malaysia International: Host: Ipoh, Malaysia; Venue: Arena Badminton Perak; Level: International Challenge; Prize: $25,000; Format: 64MS/32WS/32MD/32WD/32XD	Score: 21–17, 21–19	
13 November	Irish Open: Host: Dublin, Republic of Ireland; Venue: National Indoor Arena; Level: International Challenge; Prize: $15,000; Format: 32MS/32WS/32MD/32WD/32XD	(Republic of Ireland) Nhat Nguyen	(France) Alex Lanier
13 November	Irish Open: Host: Dublin, Republic of Ireland; Venue: National Indoor Arena; Level: International Challenge; Prize: $15,000; Format: 32MS/32WS/32MD/32WD/32XD	Score: 21–13, 21–19	
13 November	Irish Open: Host: Dublin, Republic of Ireland; Venue: National Indoor Arena; Level: International Challenge; Prize: $15,000; Format: 32MS/32WS/32MD/32WD/32XD	(Chinese Taipei) Yang Yu-chi	(Japan) Haruna Konishi
13 November	Irish Open: Host: Dublin, Republic of Ireland; Venue: National Indoor Arena; Level: International Challenge; Prize: $15,000; Format: 32MS/32WS/32MD/32WD/32XD	Score: 21–13, 16–21, 21–15	
13 November	Irish Open: Host: Dublin, Republic of Ireland; Venue: National Indoor Arena; Level: International Challenge; Prize: $15,000; Format: 32MS/32WS/32MD/32WD/32XD	(Scotland) Christopher Grimley (Scotland) Matthew Grimley	(Denmark) Andreas Søndergaard (Denmark) Jesper Toft
13 November	Irish Open: Host: Dublin, Republic of Ireland; Venue: National Indoor Arena; Level: International Challenge; Prize: $15,000; Format: 32MS/32WS/32MD/32WD/32XD	Score: 22–20, 16–21, 21–17	
13 November	Irish Open: Host: Dublin, Republic of Ireland; Venue: National Indoor Arena; Level: International Challenge; Prize: $15,000; Format: 32MS/32WS/32MD/32WD/32XD	(Denmark) Maiken Fruergaard (Denmark) Sara Thygesen	(Bulgaria) Gabriela Stoeva (Bulgaria) Stefani Stoeva
13 November	Irish Open: Host: Dublin, Republic of Ireland; Venue: National Indoor Arena; Level: International Challenge; Prize: $15,000; Format: 32MS/32WS/32MD/32WD/32XD	Score: 21–19, 17–21, 24–22	
13 November	Irish Open: Host: Dublin, Republic of Ireland; Venue: National Indoor Arena; Level: International Challenge; Prize: $15,000; Format: 32MS/32WS/32MD/32WD/32XD	(Singapore) Terry Hee (Singapore) Jessica Tan	(England) Gregory Mairs (England) Jenny Mairs
13 November	Irish Open: Host: Dublin, Republic of Ireland; Venue: National Indoor Arena; Level: International Challenge; Prize: $15,000; Format: 32MS/32WS/32MD/32WD/32XD	Score: 21–17, 18–21, 21–15	
13 November	Bahrain International: Host: Manama, Bahrain; Venue: India Club Bahrain; Level: International Series; Prize: $5,000; Format: 32MS/16WS/16MD/16WD/16XD	(China) Wang Zhengxing	(India) Ayush Shetty
13 November	Bahrain International: Host: Manama, Bahrain; Venue: India Club Bahrain; Level: International Series; Prize: $5,000; Format: 32MS/16WS/16MD/16WD/16XD	Score: 21–19, 21–14	
13 November	Bahrain International: Host: Manama, Bahrain; Venue: India Club Bahrain; Level: International Series; Prize: $5,000; Format: 32MS/16WS/16MD/16WD/16XD	(China) Chen Lu	(China) Dai Wang
13 November	Bahrain International: Host: Manama, Bahrain; Venue: India Club Bahrain; Level: International Series; Prize: $5,000; Format: 32MS/16WS/16MD/16WD/16XD	Score: 21–13, 21–10	
13 November	Bahrain International: Host: Manama, Bahrain; Venue: India Club Bahrain; Level: International Series; Prize: $5,000; Format: 32MS/16WS/16MD/16WD/16XD	(China) Xie Haonan (China) Zeng Weihan	(Thailand) Sirawit Sothon (Thailand) Natthapat Trinkajee
13 November	Bahrain International: Host: Manama, Bahrain; Venue: India Club Bahrain; Level: International Series; Prize: $5,000; Format: 32MS/16WS/16MD/16WD/16XD	Score: 21–15, 21–9	
13 November	Bahrain International: Host: Manama, Bahrain; Venue: India Club Bahrain; Level: International Series; Prize: $5,000; Format: 32MS/16WS/16MD/16WD/16XD	(China) Wang Tingge (China) Wang Yiduo	(China) Ding Keyun (China) Wang Zimeng
13 November	Bahrain International: Host: Manama, Bahrain; Venue: India Club Bahrain; Level: International Series; Prize: $5,000; Format: 32MS/16WS/16MD/16WD/16XD	Score: 23–21, 16–21, 21–19	
13 November	Bahrain International: Host: Manama, Bahrain; Venue: India Club Bahrain; Level: International Series; Prize: $5,000; Format: 32MS/16WS/16MD/16WD/16XD	(China) Ma Xixiang (China) Wu Mengying	(China) Zhou Zhihong (China) Yang Jiayi
13 November	Bahrain International: Host: Manama, Bahrain; Venue: India Club Bahrain; Level: International Series; Prize: $5,000; Format: 32MS/16WS/16MD/16WD/16XD	Score: 21–17, 21–13	
13 November	Zambia International: Host: Lusaka, Zambia; Venue: OYDC Zambia - Sports Development Centre; Level: International Series; Prize: $5,000; Format: 32MS/32WS/16MD/8WD/16XD	(Mexico) Luis Ramón Garrido	(Norway) Markus Barth
13 November	Zambia International: Host: Lusaka, Zambia; Venue: OYDC Zambia - Sports Development Centre; Level: International Series; Prize: $5,000; Format: 32MS/32WS/16MD/8WD/16XD	Score: 22–20, 21–18	
13 November	Zambia International: Host: Lusaka, Zambia; Venue: OYDC Zambia - Sports Development Centre; Level: International Series; Prize: $5,000; Format: 32MS/32WS/16MD/8WD/16XD	(France) Malya Hoareau	(Mexico) Vanessa García
13 November	Zambia International: Host: Lusaka, Zambia; Venue: OYDC Zambia - Sports Development Centre; Level: International Series; Prize: $5,000; Format: 32MS/32WS/16MD/8WD/16XD	Score: 21–14, 21–9	
13 November	Zambia International: Host: Lusaka, Zambia; Venue: OYDC Zambia - Sports Development Centre; Level: International Series; Prize: $5,000; Format: 32MS/32WS/16MD/8WD/16XD	(Algeria) Koceila Mammeri (Algeria) Youcef Sabri Medel	(Malaysia) Keane Chok (Malaysia) Andy Kok
13 November	Zambia International: Host: Lusaka, Zambia; Venue: OYDC Zambia - Sports Development Centre; Level: International Series; Prize: $5,000; Format: 32MS/32WS/16MD/8WD/16XD	Score: 21–11, 15–21, 21–13	
13 November	Zambia International: Host: Lusaka, Zambia; Venue: OYDC Zambia - Sports Development Centre; Level: International Series; Prize: $5,000; Format: 32MS/32WS/16MD/8WD/16XD	(South Africa) Amy Ackerman (South Africa) Deidre Laurens	(Uganda) Husina Kobugabe (Uganda) Gladys Mbabazi
13 November	Zambia International: Host: Lusaka, Zambia; Venue: OYDC Zambia - Sports Development Centre; Level: International Series; Prize: $5,000; Format: 32MS/32WS/16MD/8WD/16XD	Score: 21–13, 21–15	
13 November	Zambia International: Host: Lusaka, Zambia; Venue: OYDC Zambia - Sports Development Centre; Level: International Series; Prize: $5,000; Format: 32MS/32WS/16MD/8WD/16XD	(Algeria) Koceila Mammeri (Algeria) Tanina Mammeri	(Mauritius) Melvin Appiah (Mauritius) Vilina Appiah
13 November	Zambia International: Host: Lusaka, Zambia; Venue: OYDC Zambia - Sports Development Centre; Level: International Series; Prize: $5,000; Format: 32MS/32WS/16MD/8WD/16XD	Score: 21–5, 21–13	
13 November	Suriname International: Host: Paramaribo, Suriname; Venue: Ring Sport Center; Level: International Series; Prize: $5,000; Format: 32MS/16WS/16MD/4WD/8XD	(El Salvador) Uriel Canjura	(Mexico) Giovanni Toti
13 November	Suriname International: Host: Paramaribo, Suriname; Venue: Ring Sport Center; Level: International Series; Prize: $5,000; Format: 32MS/16WS/16MD/4WD/8XD	Score: 21–11, 21–12	
13 November	Suriname International: Host: Paramaribo, Suriname; Venue: Ring Sport Center; Level: International Series; Prize: $5,000; Format: 32MS/16WS/16MD/4WD/8XD	(Mexico) Haramara Gaitán	(Mexico) Sabrina Solis
13 November	Suriname International: Host: Paramaribo, Suriname; Venue: Ring Sport Center; Level: International Series; Prize: $5,000; Format: 32MS/16WS/16MD/4WD/8XD	Score: 18–21, 21–9, 21–17	
13 November	Suriname International: Host: Paramaribo, Suriname; Venue: Ring Sport Center; Level: International Series; Prize: $5,000; Format: 32MS/16WS/16MD/4WD/8XD	(Suriname) Sören Opti (Suriname) Mitchel Wongsodikromo	(Suriname) Diego Dos Ramos (Suriname) Al-Hassan Somedjo
13 November	Suriname International: Host: Paramaribo, Suriname; Venue: Ring Sport Center; Level: International Series; Prize: $5,000; Format: 32MS/16WS/16MD/4WD/8XD	Score: 21–18, 21–9	
13 November	Suriname International: Host: Paramaribo, Suriname; Venue: Ring Sport Center; Level: International Series; Prize: $5,000; Format: 32MS/16WS/16MD/4WD/8XD	(Mexico) Haramara Gaitán (Mexico) Sabrina Solis	(Trinidad and Tobago) Amara Urquhart (Suriname) Chan Yang
13 November	Suriname International: Host: Paramaribo, Suriname; Venue: Ring Sport Center; Level: International Series; Prize: $5,000; Format: 32MS/16WS/16MD/4WD/8XD	Score: 21–7, 21–11	
13 November	Suriname International: Host: Paramaribo, Suriname; Venue: Ring Sport Center; Level: International Series; Prize: $5,000; Format: 32MS/16WS/16MD/4WD/8XD	(Suriname) Mitchel Wongsodikromo (French Guiana) Loriane Dréan	(Suriname) Rivano Bisphan (Suriname) Sion Zeegelaar
13 November	Suriname International: Host: Paramaribo, Suriname; Venue: Ring Sport Center; Level: International Series; Prize: $5,000; Format: 32MS/16WS/16MD/4WD/8XD	Score: 21–18, 21–17	
13 November	Spanish International: Host: Blanca Dona, Ibiza, Spain; Venue: Polideportivo Blancadona; Level: Future Series; Prize: $2,500; Format: 32MS/32WS/32MD/32WD/32XD	(Denmark) Jakob Houe	(England) Nadeem Dalvi
13 November	Spanish International: Host: Blanca Dona, Ibiza, Spain; Venue: Polideportivo Blancadona; Level: Future Series; Prize: $2,500; Format: 32MS/32WS/32MD/32WD/32XD	Score: 21–17, 21–16	
13 November	Spanish International: Host: Blanca Dona, Ibiza, Spain; Venue: Polideportivo Blancadona; Level: Future Series; Prize: $2,500; Format: 32MS/32WS/32MD/32WD/32XD	(England) Leona Lee	(Denmark) Sofie Karmann
13 November	Spanish International: Host: Blanca Dona, Ibiza, Spain; Venue: Polideportivo Blancadona; Level: Future Series; Prize: $2,500; Format: 32MS/32WS/32MD/32WD/32XD	Score: 17–21, 21–16, 21–17	
13 November	Spanish International: Host: Blanca Dona, Ibiza, Spain; Venue: Polideportivo Blancadona; Level: Future Series; Prize: $2,500; Format: 32MS/32WS/32MD/32WD/32XD	(Spain) Rubén García (Spain) Carlos Piris	(Denmark) Mads Gadegaard (Denmark) Oliver Geisler
13 November	Spanish International: Host: Blanca Dona, Ibiza, Spain; Venue: Polideportivo Blancadona; Level: Future Series; Prize: $2,500; Format: 32MS/32WS/32MD/32WD/32XD	Score: 21–14, 21–11	
13 November	Spanish International: Host: Blanca Dona, Ibiza, Spain; Venue: Polideportivo Blancadona; Level: Future Series; Prize: $2,500; Format: 32MS/32WS/32MD/32WD/32XD	(Spain) Paula López (Spain) Lucía Rodríguez	(France) Marie Cesari (France) Lilou Schaffner
13 November	Spanish International: Host: Blanca Dona, Ibiza, Spain; Venue: Polideportivo Blancadona; Level: Future Series; Prize: $2,500; Format: 32MS/32WS/32MD/32WD/32XD	Score: 20–22, 21–15, 25–23	
13 November	Spanish International: Host: Blanca Dona, Ibiza, Spain; Venue: Polideportivo Blancadona; Level: Future Series; Prize: $2,500; Format: 32MS/32WS/32MD/32WD/32XD	(Spain) Rubén García (Spain) Lucía Rodríguez	(Spain) Jacobo Fernández (Spain) Paula López
13 November	Spanish International: Host: Blanca Dona, Ibiza, Spain; Venue: Polideportivo Blancadona; Level: Future Series; Prize: $2,500; Format: 32MS/32WS/32MD/32WD/32XD	Score: 21–16, 21–17	
20 November	China Masters (Draw): Host: Shenzhen, China; Venue: Shenzhen Bay Gymnasium; Level: Super 750; Prize: $1,150,000; Format: 32MS/32WS/32MD/32WD/32XD	(Japan) Kodai Naraoka	(Japan) Kenta Nishimoto
20 November	China Masters (Draw): Host: Shenzhen, China; Venue: Shenzhen Bay Gymnasium; Level: Super 750; Prize: $1,150,000; Format: 32MS/32WS/32MD/32WD/32XD	Score: 21–13, 21–13	
20 November	China Masters (Draw): Host: Shenzhen, China; Venue: Shenzhen Bay Gymnasium; Level: Super 750; Prize: $1,150,000; Format: 32MS/32WS/32MD/32WD/32XD	(China) Chen Yufei	(China) Han Yue
20 November	China Masters (Draw): Host: Shenzhen, China; Venue: Shenzhen Bay Gymnasium; Level: Super 750; Prize: $1,150,000; Format: 32MS/32WS/32MD/32WD/32XD	Score: 18–21, 21–4^{r}	
20 November	China Masters (Draw): Host: Shenzhen, China; Venue: Shenzhen Bay Gymnasium; Level: Super 750; Prize: $1,150,000; Format: 32MS/32WS/32MD/32WD/32XD	(China) Liang Weikeng (China) Wang Chang	(India) Satwiksairaj Rankireddy (India) Chirag Shetty
20 November	China Masters (Draw): Host: Shenzhen, China; Venue: Shenzhen Bay Gymnasium; Level: Super 750; Prize: $1,150,000; Format: 32MS/32WS/32MD/32WD/32XD	Score: 21–19, 18–21, 21–19	
20 November	China Masters (Draw): Host: Shenzhen, China; Venue: Shenzhen Bay Gymnasium; Level: Super 750; Prize: $1,150,000; Format: 32MS/32WS/32MD/32WD/32XD	(Japan) Nami Matsuyama (Japan) Chiharu Shida	(Japan) Yuki Fukushima (Japan) Sayaka Hirota
20 November	China Masters (Draw): Host: Shenzhen, China; Venue: Shenzhen Bay Gymnasium; Level: Super 750; Prize: $1,150,000; Format: 32MS/32WS/32MD/32WD/32XD	Score: 21–18, 21–11	
20 November	China Masters (Draw): Host: Shenzhen, China; Venue: Shenzhen Bay Gymnasium; Level: Super 750; Prize: $1,150,000; Format: 32MS/32WS/32MD/32WD/32XD	(China) Zheng Siwei (China) Huang Yaqiong	(South Korea) Seo Seung-jae (South Korea) Chae Yoo-jung
20 November	China Masters (Draw): Host: Shenzhen, China; Venue: Shenzhen Bay Gymnasium; Level: Super 750; Prize: $1,150,000; Format: 32MS/32WS/32MD/32WD/32XD	Score: 21–10, 21–11	
20 November	Bahrain International: Host: Manama, Bahrain; Venue: BKS Club; Level: International Challenge; Prize: $15,000; Format: 32MS/16WS/16MD/16WD/16XD	(Japan) Minoru Koga	(Japan) Riki Takei
20 November	Bahrain International: Host: Manama, Bahrain; Venue: BKS Club; Level: International Challenge; Prize: $15,000; Format: 32MS/16WS/16MD/16WD/16XD	Score: 11–21, 21–15, 21–18	
20 November	Bahrain International: Host: Manama, Bahrain; Venue: BKS Club; Level: International Challenge; Prize: $15,000; Format: 32MS/16WS/16MD/16WD/16XD	(China) Chen Lu	(China) Wu Luoyu
20 November	Bahrain International: Host: Manama, Bahrain; Venue: BKS Club; Level: International Challenge; Prize: $15,000; Format: 32MS/16WS/16MD/16WD/16XD	Score: 21–19, 18–21, 21–11	
20 November	Bahrain International: Host: Manama, Bahrain; Venue: BKS Club; Level: International Challenge; Prize: $15,000; Format: 32MS/16WS/16MD/16WD/16XD	(Japan) Kazuki Shibata (Japan) Naoki Yamada	(India) Krishna Prasad Garaga (India) K. Sai Pratheek
20 November	Bahrain International: Host: Manama, Bahrain; Venue: BKS Club; Level: International Challenge; Prize: $15,000; Format: 32MS/16WS/16MD/16WD/16XD	Score: 16–21, 21–17, 21–15	
20 November	Bahrain International: Host: Manama, Bahrain; Venue: BKS Club; Level: International Challenge; Prize: $15,000; Format: 32MS/16WS/16MD/16WD/16XD	(Bulgaria) Gabriela Stoeva (Bulgaria) Stefani Stoeva	(Japan) Kokona Ishikawa (Japan) Mio Konegawa
20 November	Bahrain International: Host: Manama, Bahrain; Venue: BKS Club; Level: International Challenge; Prize: $15,000; Format: 32MS/16WS/16MD/16WD/16XD	Score: 21–19, 21–14	
20 November	Bahrain International: Host: Manama, Bahrain; Venue: BKS Club; Level: International Challenge; Prize: $15,000; Format: 32MS/16WS/16MD/16WD/16XD	(China) Zhou Zhihong (China) Yang Jiayi	(England) Gregory Mairs (England) Jenny Mairs
20 November	Bahrain International: Host: Manama, Bahrain; Venue: BKS Club; Level: International Challenge; Prize: $15,000; Format: 32MS/16WS/16MD/16WD/16XD	Score: 28–26, 16–21, 22–20	
20 November	Slovenian International (cancelled): Host: Ljubljana, Slovenia; Venue: Dvorana Dolgi Most; Level: International Series; Prize: $5,000; Format: 64MS/32WS/32MD/32WD/32XD		
20 November	Slovenian International (cancelled): Host: Ljubljana, Slovenia; Venue: Dvorana Dolgi Most; Level: International Series; Prize: $5,000; Format: 64MS/32WS/32MD/32WD/32XD	Score:	
20 November	Slovenian International (cancelled): Host: Ljubljana, Slovenia; Venue: Dvorana Dolgi Most; Level: International Series; Prize: $5,000; Format: 64MS/32WS/32MD/32WD/32XD	Score:	
20 November	Slovenian International (cancelled): Host: Ljubljana, Slovenia; Venue: Dvorana Dolgi Most; Level: International Series; Prize: $5,000; Format: 64MS/32WS/32MD/32WD/32XD	Score:	
20 November	Slovenian International (cancelled): Host: Ljubljana, Slovenia; Venue: Dvorana Dolgi Most; Level: International Series; Prize: $5,000; Format: 64MS/32WS/32MD/32WD/32XD	Score:	
20 November	Slovenian International (cancelled): Host: Ljubljana, Slovenia; Venue: Dvorana Dolgi Most; Level: International Series; Prize: $5,000; Format: 64MS/32WS/32MD/32WD/32XD	Score:	
20 November	Mexican International: Host: Tijuana, Mexico; Venue: Centro de Alto Rendimiento; Level: International Series; Prize: $5,000; Format: 32MS/32WS/8MD/8WD/16XD	(Guatemala) Kevin Cordón	(Croatia) Aria Dinata
20 November	Mexican International: Host: Tijuana, Mexico; Venue: Centro de Alto Rendimiento; Level: International Series; Prize: $5,000; Format: 32MS/32WS/8MD/8WD/16XD	Score: 21–15, 21–15	
20 November	Mexican International: Host: Tijuana, Mexico; Venue: Centro de Alto Rendimiento; Level: International Series; Prize: $5,000; Format: 32MS/32WS/8MD/8WD/16XD	(Canada) Talia Ng	(United States) Ishika Jaiswal
20 November	Mexican International: Host: Tijuana, Mexico; Venue: Centro de Alto Rendimiento; Level: International Series; Prize: $5,000; Format: 32MS/32WS/8MD/8WD/16XD	Score: 21–15, 14–21, 21–19	
20 November	Mexican International: Host: Tijuana, Mexico; Venue: Centro de Alto Rendimiento; Level: International Series; Prize: $5,000; Format: 32MS/32WS/8MD/8WD/16XD	(United States) Zicheng Xu (United States) Tianqi Zhang	(Mexico) Job Castillo (Mexico) Luis Montoya
20 November	Mexican International: Host: Tijuana, Mexico; Venue: Centro de Alto Rendimiento; Level: International Series; Prize: $5,000; Format: 32MS/32WS/8MD/8WD/16XD	Score: Walkover	
20 November	Mexican International: Host: Tijuana, Mexico; Venue: Centro de Alto Rendimiento; Level: International Series; Prize: $5,000; Format: 32MS/32WS/8MD/8WD/16XD	(Mexico) Vanessa García (Mexico) Cecilia Madera	(Mexico) Joceline López (Mexico) Mayté Marín
20 November	Mexican International: Host: Tijuana, Mexico; Venue: Centro de Alto Rendimiento; Level: International Series; Prize: $5,000; Format: 32MS/32WS/8MD/8WD/16XD	Score: 21–15, 21–19	
20 November	Mexican International: Host: Tijuana, Mexico; Venue: Centro de Alto Rendimiento; Level: International Series; Prize: $5,000; Format: 32MS/32WS/8MD/8WD/16XD	(Mexico) Luis Montoya (Mexico) Miriam Rodríguez	(Mexico) Irving Pérez (Mexico) Cecilia Madera
20 November	Mexican International: Host: Tijuana, Mexico; Venue: Centro de Alto Rendimiento; Level: International Series; Prize: $5,000; Format: 32MS/32WS/8MD/8WD/16XD	Score: 21–13, 21–11	
20 November	Botswana International: Host: Gaborone, Botswana; Venue: Alnur International School; Level: Future Series; Format: 32MS/32WS/16MD/16WD/32XD	(Mauritius) Julien Paul	(United Arab Emirates) Somi Romdhani
20 November	Botswana International: Host: Gaborone, Botswana; Venue: Alnur International School; Level: Future Series; Format: 32MS/32WS/16MD/16WD/32XD	Score: 21–12, 22–20	
20 November	Botswana International: Host: Gaborone, Botswana; Venue: Alnur International School; Level: Future Series; Format: 32MS/32WS/16MD/16WD/32XD	(United Arab Emirates) Nurani Ratu Azzahra	(United Arab Emirates) Madhumitha Sundarapandian
20 November	Botswana International: Host: Gaborone, Botswana; Venue: Alnur International School; Level: Future Series; Format: 32MS/32WS/16MD/16WD/32XD	Score: 21–18, 21–17	
20 November	Botswana International: Host: Gaborone, Botswana; Venue: Alnur International School; Level: Future Series; Format: 32MS/32WS/16MD/16WD/32XD	(Malaysia) Keane Chok (Malaysia) Andy Kok	(Mauritius) Lucas Douce (Mauritius) Khemtish Rai Nundah
20 November	Botswana International: Host: Gaborone, Botswana; Venue: Alnur International School; Level: Future Series; Format: 32MS/32WS/16MD/16WD/32XD	Score: 21–12, 21–10	
20 November	Botswana International: Host: Gaborone, Botswana; Venue: Alnur International School; Level: Future Series; Format: 32MS/32WS/16MD/16WD/32XD	(South Africa) Amy Ackerman (South Africa) Deidre Laurens	(Maldives) Aminath Nabeeha Abdul Razzaq (Maldives) Fathimath Nabaaha Abdul Razzaq
20 November	Botswana International: Host: Gaborone, Botswana; Venue: Alnur International School; Level: Future Series; Format: 32MS/32WS/16MD/16WD/32XD	Score: 21–13, 20–22, 21–18	
20 November	Botswana International: Host: Gaborone, Botswana; Venue: Alnur International School; Level: Future Series; Format: 32MS/32WS/16MD/16WD/32XD	(Mauritius) Julien Paul (Mauritius) Kate Ludik	(Mauritius) Melvin Appiah (Mauritius) Vilina Appiah
20 November	Botswana International: Host: Gaborone, Botswana; Venue: Alnur International School; Level: Future Series; Format: 32MS/32WS/16MD/16WD/32XD	Score: 21–10, 21–15	
27 November	Syed Modi International (Draw): Host: Lucknow, India; Venue: Babu Banarasi Das Indoor Stadium; Level: Super 300; Prize: $210,000; Format: 32MS/32WS/32MD/32WD/32XD	(Chinese Taipei) Chi Yu-jen	(Japan) Kenta Nishimoto
27 November	Syed Modi International (Draw): Host: Lucknow, India; Venue: Babu Banarasi Das Indoor Stadium; Level: Super 300; Prize: $210,000; Format: 32MS/32WS/32MD/32WD/32XD	Score: 20–22, 21–12, 21–17	
27 November	Syed Modi International (Draw): Host: Lucknow, India; Venue: Babu Banarasi Das Indoor Stadium; Level: Super 300; Prize: $210,000; Format: 32MS/32WS/32MD/32WD/32XD	(Japan) Nozomi Okuhara	(Denmark) Line Kjærsfeldt
27 November	Syed Modi International (Draw): Host: Lucknow, India; Venue: Babu Banarasi Das Indoor Stadium; Level: Super 300; Prize: $210,000; Format: 32MS/32WS/32MD/32WD/32XD	Score: 21–19, 21–16	
27 November	Syed Modi International (Draw): Host: Lucknow, India; Venue: Babu Banarasi Das Indoor Stadium; Level: Super 300; Prize: $210,000; Format: 32MS/32WS/32MD/32WD/32XD	(Malaysia) Choong Hon Jian (Malaysia) Muhammad Haikal	(Japan) Akira Koga (Japan) Taichi Saito
27 November	Syed Modi International (Draw): Host: Lucknow, India; Venue: Babu Banarasi Das Indoor Stadium; Level: Super 300; Prize: $210,000; Format: 32MS/32WS/32MD/32WD/32XD	Score: 18–21, 21–18, 21–16	
27 November	Syed Modi International (Draw): Host: Lucknow, India; Venue: Babu Banarasi Das Indoor Stadium; Level: Super 300; Prize: $210,000; Format: 32MS/32WS/32MD/32WD/32XD	(Japan) Rin Iwanaga (Japan) Kie Nakanishi	(India) Tanisha Crasto (India) Ashwini Ponnappa
27 November	Syed Modi International (Draw): Host: Lucknow, India; Venue: Babu Banarasi Das Indoor Stadium; Level: Super 300; Prize: $210,000; Format: 32MS/32WS/32MD/32WD/32XD	Score: 21–14, 17–21, 21–15	
27 November	Syed Modi International (Draw): Host: Lucknow, India; Venue: Babu Banarasi Das Indoor Stadium; Level: Super 300; Prize: $210,000; Format: 32MS/32WS/32MD/32WD/32XD	(Indonesia) Dejan Ferdinansyah (Indonesia) Gloria Emanuelle Widjaja	(Japan) Yuki Kaneko (Japan) Misaki Matsutomo
27 November	Syed Modi International (Draw): Host: Lucknow, India; Venue: Babu Banarasi Das Indoor Stadium; Level: Super 300; Prize: $210,000; Format: 32MS/32WS/32MD/32WD/32XD	Score: 20–22, 21–19, 25–23	
27 November	Welsh International: Host: Cardiff, Wales; Venue: Sport Wales National Centre; Level: International Challenge; Prize: $15,000; Format: 32MS/32WS/32MD/32WD/32XD	(Finland) Joakim Oldorff	(England) Cholan Kayan
27 November	Welsh International: Host: Cardiff, Wales; Venue: Sport Wales National Centre; Level: International Challenge; Prize: $15,000; Format: 32MS/32WS/32MD/32WD/32XD	Score: 21–11, 21–19	
27 November	Welsh International: Host: Cardiff, Wales; Venue: Sport Wales National Centre; Level: International Challenge; Prize: $15,000; Format: 32MS/32WS/32MD/32WD/32XD	(France) Rosy Oktavia Pancasari	(Hungary) Ágnes Kőrösi
27 November	Welsh International: Host: Cardiff, Wales; Venue: Sport Wales National Centre; Level: International Challenge; Prize: $15,000; Format: 32MS/32WS/32MD/32WD/32XD	Score: 21–14, 21–14	
27 November	Welsh International: Host: Cardiff, Wales; Venue: Sport Wales National Centre; Level: International Challenge; Prize: $15,000; Format: 32MS/32WS/32MD/32WD/32XD	(Scotland) Christopher Grimley (Scotland) Matthew Grimley	(Germany) Bjarne Geiss (Germany) Jan Colin Völker
27 November	Welsh International: Host: Cardiff, Wales; Venue: Sport Wales National Centre; Level: International Challenge; Prize: $15,000; Format: 32MS/32WS/32MD/32WD/32XD	Score: 18–21, 21–16, 21–17	
27 November	Welsh International: Host: Cardiff, Wales; Venue: Sport Wales National Centre; Level: International Challenge; Prize: $15,000; Format: 32MS/32WS/32MD/32WD/32XD	(Bulgaria) Gabriela Stoeva (Bulgaria) Stefani Stoeva	(Denmark) Natasja Anthonisen (Netherlands) Alyssa Tirtosentono
27 November	Welsh International: Host: Cardiff, Wales; Venue: Sport Wales National Centre; Level: International Challenge; Prize: $15,000; Format: 32MS/32WS/32MD/32WD/32XD	Score: 24–22, 21–11	
27 November	Welsh International: Host: Cardiff, Wales; Venue: Sport Wales National Centre; Level: International Challenge; Prize: $15,000; Format: 32MS/32WS/32MD/32WD/32XD	(Germany) Jan Colin Völker (Germany) Stine Küspert	(England) Gregory Mairs (England) Jenny Mairs
27 November	Welsh International: Host: Cardiff, Wales; Venue: Sport Wales National Centre; Level: International Challenge; Prize: $15,000; Format: 32MS/32WS/32MD/32WD/32XD	Score: 22–20, 21–16	
27 November	El Salvador International: Host: San Salvador, El Salvador; Venue: Coliseo de Bádminton "El Polvorín"; Level: International Challenge; Prize: $15,000; Format: 32MS/32WS/32MD/16WD/32XD	(Guatemala) Kevin Cordón	(Brazil) Ygor Coelho
27 November	El Salvador International: Host: San Salvador, El Salvador; Venue: Coliseo de Bádminton "El Polvorín"; Level: International Challenge; Prize: $15,000; Format: 32MS/32WS/32MD/16WD/32XD	Score: 21–17, 15–21, 21–19	
27 November	El Salvador International: Host: San Salvador, El Salvador; Venue: Coliseo de Bádminton "El Polvorín"; Level: International Challenge; Prize: $15,000; Format: 32MS/32WS/32MD/16WD/32XD	(Brazil) Juliana Viana Vieira	(United States) Disha Gupta
27 November	El Salvador International: Host: San Salvador, El Salvador; Venue: Coliseo de Bádminton "El Polvorín"; Level: International Challenge; Prize: $15,000; Format: 32MS/32WS/32MD/16WD/32XD	Score: 21–12, 21–11	
27 November	El Salvador International: Host: San Salvador, El Salvador; Venue: Coliseo de Bádminton "El Polvorín"; Level: International Challenge; Prize: $15,000; Format: 32MS/32WS/32MD/16WD/32XD	(Canada) Kevin Lee (Canada) Ty Alexander Lindeman	(United States) Vinson Chiu (United States) Joshua Yuan
27 November	El Salvador International: Host: San Salvador, El Salvador; Venue: Coliseo de Bádminton "El Polvorín"; Level: International Challenge; Prize: $15,000; Format: 32MS/32WS/32MD/16WD/32XD	Score: 21–15, 21–18	
27 November	El Salvador International: Host: San Salvador, El Salvador; Venue: Coliseo de Bádminton "El Polvorín"; Level: International Challenge; Prize: $15,000; Format: 32MS/32WS/32MD/16WD/32XD	(United States) Francesca Corbett (United States) Allison Lee	(United States) Annie Xu (United States) Kerry Xu
27 November	El Salvador International: Host: San Salvador, El Salvador; Venue: Coliseo de Bádminton "El Polvorín"; Level: International Challenge; Prize: $15,000; Format: 32MS/32WS/32MD/16WD/32XD	Score: 21–18, 21–11	
27 November	El Salvador International: Host: San Salvador, El Salvador; Venue: Coliseo de Bádminton "El Polvorín"; Level: International Challenge; Prize: $15,000; Format: 32MS/32WS/32MD/16WD/32XD	(United States) Presley Smith (United States) Allison Lee	(Brazil) Davi Silva (Brazil) Sânia Lima
27 November	El Salvador International: Host: San Salvador, El Salvador; Venue: Coliseo de Bádminton "El Polvorín"; Level: International Challenge; Prize: $15,000; Format: 32MS/32WS/32MD/16WD/32XD	Score: 22–20, 21–18	
27 November	South Africa International: Host: Cape Town, South Africa; Venue: John Tyers Hall; Level: Future Series; Format: 32MS/16WS/16MD/8WD/32XD	(England) Nadeem Dalvi	(Mauritius) Julien Paul
27 November	South Africa International: Host: Cape Town, South Africa; Venue: John Tyers Hall; Level: Future Series; Format: 32MS/16WS/16MD/8WD/32XD	Score: 21–12, 23–21	
27 November	South Africa International: Host: Cape Town, South Africa; Venue: John Tyers Hall; Level: Future Series; Format: 32MS/16WS/16MD/8WD/32XD	(Mauritius) Kate Ludik	(Egypt) Nour Ahmed Youssri
27 November	South Africa International: Host: Cape Town, South Africa; Venue: John Tyers Hall; Level: Future Series; Format: 32MS/16WS/16MD/8WD/32XD	Score: 21–16, 21–14	
27 November	South Africa International: Host: Cape Town, South Africa; Venue: John Tyers Hall; Level: Future Series; Format: 32MS/16WS/16MD/8WD/32XD	(South Africa) Caden Kakora (South Africa) Robert White	(South Africa) Jarred Elliott (South Africa) Robert Summers
27 November	South Africa International: Host: Cape Town, South Africa; Venue: John Tyers Hall; Level: Future Series; Format: 32MS/16WS/16MD/8WD/32XD	Score: 21–15, 22–20	
27 November	South Africa International: Host: Cape Town, South Africa; Venue: John Tyers Hall; Level: Future Series; Format: 32MS/16WS/16MD/8WD/32XD	(South Africa) Amy Ackerman (South Africa) Deidre Laurens	(South Africa) Megan de Beer (South Africa) Johanita Scholtz
27 November	South Africa International: Host: Cape Town, South Africa; Venue: John Tyers Hall; Level: Future Series; Format: 32MS/16WS/16MD/8WD/32XD	Score: 21–14, 21–19	
27 November	South Africa International: Host: Cape Town, South Africa; Venue: John Tyers Hall; Level: Future Series; Format: 32MS/16WS/16MD/8WD/32XD	(South Africa) Robert White (South Africa) Deidre Laurens	(Egypt) Adham Hatem Elgamal (Egypt) Doha Hany
27 November	South Africa International: Host: Cape Town, South Africa; Venue: John Tyers Hall; Level: Future Series; Format: 32MS/16WS/16MD/8WD/32XD	Score: 10–21, 21–17, 21–18	

=== December ===
Date	Tournament	Champions	Runners-up
4 December	Guwahati Masters (Draw): Host: Guwahati, India; Venue: Saru Sajai Indoor Sports Complex; Level: Super 100; Prize: $100,000; Format: 48MS/32WS/32MD/32WD/32XD	(Indonesia) Yohanes Saut Marcellyno	(Indonesia) Alvi Wijaya Chairullah
4 December	Guwahati Masters (Draw): Host: Guwahati, India; Venue: Saru Sajai Indoor Sports Complex; Level: Super 100; Prize: $100,000; Format: 48MS/32WS/32MD/32WD/32XD	Score: 21–12, 21–17	
4 December	Guwahati Masters (Draw): Host: Guwahati, India; Venue: Saru Sajai Indoor Sports Complex; Level: Super 100; Prize: $100,000; Format: 48MS/32WS/32MD/32WD/32XD	(Thailand) Lalinrat Chaiwan	(Denmark) Line Christophersen
4 December	Guwahati Masters (Draw): Host: Guwahati, India; Venue: Saru Sajai Indoor Sports Complex; Level: Super 100; Prize: $100,000; Format: 48MS/32WS/32MD/32WD/32XD	Score: 21–14, 17–21, 21–16	
4 December	Guwahati Masters (Draw): Host: Guwahati, India; Venue: Saru Sajai Indoor Sports Complex; Level: Super 100; Prize: $100,000; Format: 48MS/32WS/32MD/32WD/32XD	(Malaysia) Choong Hon Jian (Malaysia) Muhammad Haikal	(Chinese Taipei) Lin Bing-wei (Chinese Taipei) Su Ching-heng
4 December	Guwahati Masters (Draw): Host: Guwahati, India; Venue: Saru Sajai Indoor Sports Complex; Level: Super 100; Prize: $100,000; Format: 48MS/32WS/32MD/32WD/32XD	Score: 21–17, 23–21	
4 December	Guwahati Masters (Draw): Host: Guwahati, India; Venue: Saru Sajai Indoor Sports Complex; Level: Super 100; Prize: $100,000; Format: 48MS/32WS/32MD/32WD/32XD	(India) Tanisha Crasto (India) Ashwini Ponnappa	(Chinese Taipei) Sung Shuo-yun (Chinese Taipei) Yu Chien-hui
4 December	Guwahati Masters (Draw): Host: Guwahati, India; Venue: Saru Sajai Indoor Sports Complex; Level: Super 100; Prize: $100,000; Format: 48MS/32WS/32MD/32WD/32XD	Score: 21–13, 21–19	
4 December	Guwahati Masters (Draw): Host: Guwahati, India; Venue: Saru Sajai Indoor Sports Complex; Level: Super 100; Prize: $100,000; Format: 48MS/32WS/32MD/32WD/32XD	(Singapore) Terry Hee (Singapore) Jessica Tan	(Denmark) Mads Vestergaard (Denmark) Christine Busch
4 December	Guwahati Masters (Draw): Host: Guwahati, India; Venue: Saru Sajai Indoor Sports Complex; Level: Super 100; Prize: $100,000; Format: 48MS/32WS/32MD/32WD/32XD	Score: 21–19, 21–11	
4 December	Bangladesh International (cancelled) (Note: This tournament, originally to be played on 6–10 December, was later cancelled.): Host: Dhaka, Bangladesh; Venue: Shahid Tajuddin Ahmed Indoor Stadium; Level: International Challenge; Prize: $15,000; Format: 32MS/32WS/32MD/32WD/32XD		
4 December	Bangladesh International (cancelled): Host: Dhaka, Bangladesh; Venue: Shahid Tajuddin Ahmed Indoor Stadium; Level: International Challenge; Prize: $15,000; Format: 32MS/32WS/32MD/32WD/32XD	Score:	
4 December	Bangladesh International (cancelled): Host: Dhaka, Bangladesh; Venue: Shahid Tajuddin Ahmed Indoor Stadium; Level: International Challenge; Prize: $15,000; Format: 32MS/32WS/32MD/32WD/32XD	Score:	
4 December	Bangladesh International (cancelled): Host: Dhaka, Bangladesh; Venue: Shahid Tajuddin Ahmed Indoor Stadium; Level: International Challenge; Prize: $15,000; Format: 32MS/32WS/32MD/32WD/32XD	Score:	
4 December	Bangladesh International (cancelled): Host: Dhaka, Bangladesh; Venue: Shahid Tajuddin Ahmed Indoor Stadium; Level: International Challenge; Prize: $15,000; Format: 32MS/32WS/32MD/32WD/32XD	Score:	
4 December	Bangladesh International (cancelled): Host: Dhaka, Bangladesh; Venue: Shahid Tajuddin Ahmed Indoor Stadium; Level: International Challenge; Prize: $15,000; Format: 32MS/32WS/32MD/32WD/32XD	Score:	
4 December	Canadian International: Host: Markham, Ontario, Canada; Venue: Markham Pan Am Centre; Level: International Challenge; Prize: $25,000; Format: 64MS/64WS/32MD/32WD/32XD	(Canada) Brian Yang	(Canada) Victor Lai
4 December	Canadian International: Host: Markham, Ontario, Canada; Venue: Markham Pan Am Centre; Level: International Challenge; Prize: $25,000; Format: 64MS/64WS/32MD/32WD/32XD	Score: 21–15, 21–12	
4 December	Canadian International: Host: Markham, Ontario, Canada; Venue: Markham Pan Am Centre; Level: International Challenge; Prize: $25,000; Format: 64MS/64WS/32MD/32WD/32XD	(Canada) Wenyu Zhang	(Canada) Rachel Chan
4 December	Canadian International: Host: Markham, Ontario, Canada; Venue: Markham Pan Am Centre; Level: International Challenge; Prize: $25,000; Format: 64MS/64WS/32MD/32WD/32XD	Score: 22–24, 21–17, 22–20	
4 December	Canadian International: Host: Markham, Ontario, Canada; Venue: Markham Pan Am Centre; Level: International Challenge; Prize: $25,000; Format: 64MS/64WS/32MD/32WD/32XD	(Malaysia) Mohamad Arif Abdul Latif (Canada) Jonathan Lai	(Canada) Adam Dong (Canada) Nyl Yakura
4 December	Canadian International: Host: Markham, Ontario, Canada; Venue: Markham Pan Am Centre; Level: International Challenge; Prize: $25,000; Format: 64MS/64WS/32MD/32WD/32XD	Score: 13–21, 21–17, 21–15	
4 December	Canadian International: Host: Markham, Ontario, Canada; Venue: Markham Pan Am Centre; Level: International Challenge; Prize: $25,000; Format: 64MS/64WS/32MD/32WD/32XD	(Canada) Jacqueline Cheung (Canada) Rachel Honderich	(Canada) Jackie Dent (Canada) Crystal Lai
4 December	Canadian International: Host: Markham, Ontario, Canada; Venue: Markham Pan Am Centre; Level: International Challenge; Prize: $25,000; Format: 64MS/64WS/32MD/32WD/32XD	Score: 21–16, 21–17	
4 December	Canadian International: Host: Markham, Ontario, Canada; Venue: Markham Pan Am Centre; Level: International Challenge; Prize: $25,000; Format: 64MS/64WS/32MD/32WD/32XD	(Indonesia) Rian Agung Saputro (Indonesia) Serena Kani	(United States) Presley Smith (United States) Allison Lee
4 December	Canadian International: Host: Markham, Ontario, Canada; Venue: Markham Pan Am Centre; Level: International Challenge; Prize: $25,000; Format: 64MS/64WS/32MD/32WD/32XD	Score: 12–21, 21–8, 21–16	
4 December	Kazakhstan International: Host: Shymkent, Kazakhstan; Venue: Almatau Resort; Level: International Series; Prize: $5,000; Format: 32MS/32WS/16MD/16WD/16XD	(Canada) Xiaodong Sheng	(India) Lakshay Sharma
4 December	Kazakhstan International: Host: Shymkent, Kazakhstan; Venue: Almatau Resort; Level: International Series; Prize: $5,000; Format: 32MS/32WS/16MD/16WD/16XD	Score: 9–21, 21–17, 21–11	
4 December	Kazakhstan International: Host: Shymkent, Kazakhstan; Venue: Almatau Resort; Level: International Series; Prize: $5,000; Format: 32MS/32WS/16MD/16WD/16XD	(Philippines) Mikaela de Guzman	(India) Arundhati Nagaraja Muddu
4 December	Kazakhstan International: Host: Shymkent, Kazakhstan; Venue: Almatau Resort; Level: International Series; Prize: $5,000; Format: 32MS/32WS/16MD/16WD/16XD	Score: 21–13, 21–17	
4 December	Kazakhstan International: Host: Shymkent, Kazakhstan; Venue: Almatau Resort; Level: International Series; Prize: $5,000; Format: 32MS/32WS/16MD/16WD/16XD	(India) Arryan R Aji (India) Syam Prasad Udayakumar	(Kazakhstan) Ibray Bayken (Kazakhstan) Yevgeniy Yevseyev
4 December	Kazakhstan International: Host: Shymkent, Kazakhstan; Venue: Almatau Resort; Level: International Series; Prize: $5,000; Format: 32MS/32WS/16MD/16WD/16XD	Score: 21–15, 21–10	
4 December	Kazakhstan International: Host: Shymkent, Kazakhstan; Venue: Almatau Resort; Level: International Series; Prize: $5,000; Format: 32MS/32WS/16MD/16WD/16XD	(Kazakhstan) Nargiza Rakhmetullayeva (Kazakhstan) Aisha Zhumabek	(Cyprus) Nadezhda Nazarenko (Kazakhstan) Kamila Smagulova
4 December	Kazakhstan International: Host: Shymkent, Kazakhstan; Venue: Almatau Resort; Level: International Series; Prize: $5,000; Format: 32MS/32WS/16MD/16WD/16XD	Score: 21–13, 21–10	
4 December	Kazakhstan International: Host: Shymkent, Kazakhstan; Venue: Almatau Resort; Level: International Series; Prize: $5,000; Format: 32MS/32WS/16MD/16WD/16XD	(Kazakhstan) Dmitriy Panarin (Kazakhstan) Kamila Smagulova	(Kazakhstan) Khaitmurat Kulmatov (Kazakhstan) Aisha Zhumabek
4 December	Kazakhstan International: Host: Shymkent, Kazakhstan; Venue: Almatau Resort; Level: International Series; Prize: $5,000; Format: 32MS/32WS/16MD/16WD/16XD	Score: 21–18, 12–21, 21–19	
11 December	BWF World Tour Finals (Draw): Host: Hangzhou, China; Venue: Binjiang Gymnasium; Level: World Tour Finals; Prize: $2,500,000; Format: 8MS/8WS/8MD/8WD/8XD	(Denmark) Viktor Axelsen	(China) Shi Yuqi
11 December	BWF World Tour Finals (Draw): Host: Hangzhou, China; Venue: Binjiang Gymnasium; Level: World Tour Finals; Prize: $2,500,000; Format: 8MS/8WS/8MD/8WD/8XD	Score: 21–11, 21–12	
11 December	BWF World Tour Finals (Draw): Host: Hangzhou, China; Venue: Binjiang Gymnasium; Level: World Tour Finals; Prize: $2,500,000; Format: 8MS/8WS/8MD/8WD/8XD	(Chinese Taipei) Tai Tzu-ying	(Spain) Carolina Marín
11 December	BWF World Tour Finals (Draw): Host: Hangzhou, China; Venue: Binjiang Gymnasium; Level: World Tour Finals; Prize: $2,500,000; Format: 8MS/8WS/8MD/8WD/8XD	Score: 12–21, 21–14, 21–18	
11 December	BWF World Tour Finals (Draw): Host: Hangzhou, China; Venue: Binjiang Gymnasium; Level: World Tour Finals; Prize: $2,500,000; Format: 8MS/8WS/8MD/8WD/8XD	(South Korea) Kang Min-hyuk (South Korea) Seo Seung-jae	(China) Liang Weikeng (China) Wang Chang
11 December	BWF World Tour Finals (Draw): Host: Hangzhou, China; Venue: Binjiang Gymnasium; Level: World Tour Finals; Prize: $2,500,000; Format: 8MS/8WS/8MD/8WD/8XD	Score: 21–17, 22–20	
11 December	BWF World Tour Finals (Draw): Host: Hangzhou, China; Venue: Binjiang Gymnasium; Level: World Tour Finals; Prize: $2,500,000; Format: 8MS/8WS/8MD/8WD/8XD	(China) Chen Qingchen (China) Jia Yifan	(South Korea) Baek Ha-na (South Korea) Lee So-hee
11 December	BWF World Tour Finals (Draw): Host: Hangzhou, China; Venue: Binjiang Gymnasium; Level: World Tour Finals; Prize: $2,500,000; Format: 8MS/8WS/8MD/8WD/8XD	Score: 21–16, 21–16	
11 December	BWF World Tour Finals (Draw): Host: Hangzhou, China; Venue: Binjiang Gymnasium; Level: World Tour Finals; Prize: $2,500,000; Format: 8MS/8WS/8MD/8WD/8XD	(China) Zheng Siwei (China) Huang Yaqiong	(China) Feng Yanzhe (China) Huang Dongping
11 December	BWF World Tour Finals (Draw): Host: Hangzhou, China; Venue: Binjiang Gymnasium; Level: World Tour Finals; Prize: $2,500,000; Format: 8MS/8WS/8MD/8WD/8XD	Score: 21–11, 21–18	
11 December	Odisha Masters (Draw): Host: Cuttack, India; Venue: Jawaharlal Nehru Indoor Stadium; Level: Super 100; Prize: $100,000; Format: 48MS/32WS/32MD/32WD/32XD	(India) Sathish Kumar Karunakaran	(India) Ayush Shetty
11 December	Odisha Masters (Draw): Host: Cuttack, India; Venue: Jawaharlal Nehru Indoor Stadium; Level: Super 100; Prize: $100,000; Format: 48MS/32WS/32MD/32WD/32XD	Score: 21–18, 19–21, 21–14	
11 December	Odisha Masters (Draw): Host: Cuttack, India; Venue: Jawaharlal Nehru Indoor Stadium; Level: Super 100; Prize: $100,000; Format: 48MS/32WS/32MD/32WD/32XD	(Japan) Nozomi Okuhara	(Hong Kong) Lo Sin Yan
11 December	Odisha Masters (Draw): Host: Cuttack, India; Venue: Jawaharlal Nehru Indoor Stadium; Level: Super 100; Prize: $100,000; Format: 48MS/32WS/32MD/32WD/32XD	Score: 21–7, 21–23, 22–20	
11 December	Odisha Masters (Draw): Host: Cuttack, India; Venue: Jawaharlal Nehru Indoor Stadium; Level: Super 100; Prize: $100,000; Format: 48MS/32WS/32MD/32WD/32XD	(Chinese Taipei) Lin Bing-wei (Chinese Taipei) Su Ching-heng	(India) Krishna Prasad Garaga (India) K. Sai Pratheek
11 December	Odisha Masters (Draw): Host: Cuttack, India; Venue: Jawaharlal Nehru Indoor Stadium; Level: Super 100; Prize: $100,000; Format: 48MS/32WS/32MD/32WD/32XD	Score: 20–22, 21–18, 21–17	
11 December	Odisha Masters (Draw): Host: Cuttack, India; Venue: Jawaharlal Nehru Indoor Stadium; Level: Super 100; Prize: $100,000; Format: 48MS/32WS/32MD/32WD/32XD	(Indonesia) Meilysa Trias Puspita Sari (Indonesia) Rachel Allessya Rose	(India) Tanisha Crasto (India) Ashwini Ponnappa
11 December	Odisha Masters (Draw): Host: Cuttack, India; Venue: Jawaharlal Nehru Indoor Stadium; Level: Super 100; Prize: $100,000; Format: 48MS/32WS/32MD/32WD/32XD	Score: 21–14, 21–17	
11 December	Odisha Masters (Draw): Host: Cuttack, India; Venue: Jawaharlal Nehru Indoor Stadium; Level: Super 100; Prize: $100,000; Format: 48MS/32WS/32MD/32WD/32XD	(India) Dhruv Kapila (India) Tanisha Crasto	(Singapore) Terry Hee (Singapore) Jessica Tan
11 December	Odisha Masters (Draw): Host: Cuttack, India; Venue: Jawaharlal Nehru Indoor Stadium; Level: Super 100; Prize: $100,000; Format: 48MS/32WS/32MD/32WD/32XD	Score: 17–21, 21–19, 23–21	
11 December	French Guiana International: Host: Matoury, French Guiana; Venue: Palais Régional Omnisport Georges Theolade; Level: Future Series; Format: 32MS/8WS/16MD/4XD	(United States) Howard Shu	(Germany) Camilo Borst
11 December	French Guiana International: Host: Matoury, French Guiana; Venue: Palais Régional Omnisport Georges Theolade; Level: Future Series; Format: 32MS/8WS/16MD/4XD	Score: 21–12, 21–16	
11 December	French Guiana International: Host: Matoury, French Guiana; Venue: Palais Régional Omnisport Georges Theolade; Level: Future Series; Format: 32MS/8WS/16MD/4XD	(Mauritius) Kate Ludik	(Trinidad and Tobago) Chequeda De Boulet
11 December	French Guiana International: Host: Matoury, French Guiana; Venue: Palais Régional Omnisport Georges Theolade; Level: Future Series; Format: 32MS/8WS/16MD/4XD	Score: 21–8, 21–4	
11 December	French Guiana International: Host: Matoury, French Guiana; Venue: Palais Régional Omnisport Georges Theolade; Level: Future Series; Format: 32MS/8WS/16MD/4XD	(Suriname) Sören Opti (Suriname) Mitchel Wongsodikromo	(French Guiana) Dimitri Antony (French Guiana) Bons Vincent
11 December	French Guiana International: Host: Matoury, French Guiana; Venue: Palais Régional Omnisport Georges Theolade; Level: Future Series; Format: 32MS/8WS/16MD/4XD	Score: 21–9, 21–12	
11 December	French Guiana International: Host: Matoury, French Guiana; Venue: Palais Régional Omnisport Georges Theolade; Level: Future Series; Format: 32MS/8WS/16MD/4XD	no competition	
11 December	French Guiana International: Host: Matoury, French Guiana; Venue: Palais Régional Omnisport Georges Theolade; Level: Future Series; Format: 32MS/8WS/16MD/4XD	Score:	
11 December	French Guiana International: Host: Matoury, French Guiana; Venue: Palais Régional Omnisport Georges Theolade; Level: Future Series; Format: 32MS/8WS/16MD/4XD	(French Guiana) Peter Dirifo (French Guiana) Elize Nijean	(French Guiana) Florian Cormenier (French Guiana) Taise Marais
11 December	French Guiana International: Host: Matoury, French Guiana; Venue: Palais Régional Omnisport Georges Theolade; Level: Future Series; Format: 32MS/8WS/16MD/4XD	Score: 14–21, 22–20, 22–20	

== BWF Player of the Year Awards ==
The followings are the nominees and the winners of the 2023 BWF Player of the Year Awards.

Player of the Year
Male Player of the Year	Female player of the Year
(South Korea) Seo Seung-jae (Men's & mixed doubles); (Denmark) Viktor Axelsen (Men's singles); (Thailand) Kunlavut Vitidsarn (Men's singles)	(South Korea) An Se-young (Women's singles); (China) Chen Yufei (Women's singles); (Japan) Akane Yamaguchi (Women's singles)
Pair of the Year
(China) Chen Qingchen / Jia Yifan (Women's doubles); (India) Satwiksairaj Rankireddy / Chirag Shetty (Men's doubles); (China) Zheng Siwei / Huang Yaqiong (Mixed doubles); (South Korea) Seo Seung-jae / Chae Yoo-jung (Mixed doubles)
Most Improved Player of the Year
(China) Jiang Zhenbang / Wei Yaxin (Mixed doubles); (Malaysia) Chen Tang Jie / Toh Ee Wei (Mixed doubles); (Denmark) Kim Astrup / Anders Skaarup Rasmussen (Men's doubles)
Eddy Choong Most Promising Player of the Year
(China) Liu Shengshu / Tan Ning (Women's doubles)
Para-badminton Player of the Year
Male Para-badminton Player of the Year	Female Para-badminton Player of the Year
(Japan) Daiki Kajiwara (Men's singles WH2 & doubles WH1–WH2); (Malaysia) Cheah Liek Hou (Men's singles SU5); (France) Lucas Mazur (Men's singles SL4 & Mixed doubles SL3–SU5); (South Korea) Kim Jung-jun (Men's singles WH2 & doubles WH1–WH2)	(Indonesia) Rina Marlina (Women's singles SH6 & mixed doubles SH6); (Indonesia) Leani Ratri Oktila (Women's singles SL4, doubles SL3–SU5 & mixed doubles SL3–SU5); (Japan) Sarina Satomi (Women's singles WH2 & doubles WH1–WH2); (Peru) Pilar Jáuregui (Women's singles WH2, doubles WH1–WH2 & mixed doubles WH1–WH2); (India) Thulasimathi Murugesan (Women's singles SU5, doubles SL3–SU5 & mixed doubles SL3–SU5); (Belgium) Man-Kei To (Women's singles WH1, doubles WH1–WH2 & mixed doubles WH1–WH2)
Para-badminton Pair of the Year
(Indonesia) Hikmat Ramdani / Leani Ratri Oktila (Mixed doubles SL3–SU5); (Indonesia) Subhan / Rina Marlina (Mixed doubles SH6); (Malaysia) Muhammad Fareez Anuar / Cheah Liek Hou (Men's doubles SU5); (Japan) Sarina Satomi / Yuma Yamazaki (Women's doubles WH1–WH2); (Indonesia) Leani Ratri Oktila / Khalimatus Sadiyah (Women's doubles SL3–SU5)

== Retirements ==
Following is a list of notable players (winners of the main tour title, and/or part of the BWF Rankings top 100 for at least one week) who announced their retirement from professional badminton, during the 2023 season:

- Mychelle Crhystine Bandaso (born 1 May 1998 in Tarakan, East Kalimantan, Indonesia) reached a career-high ranking of no. 27 in mixed doubles on 9 August 2022. She won her first BWF World Tour title at the 2019 Russian Open Super 100 event in mixed doubles with her partner Adnan Maulana. She also won a bronze medal in the individual event at the 2021 Southeast Asian Games. According to former badminton player Debby Susanto, Bandaso retired due to an unspecified medical condition. The 2022 Indonesia Masters was her last tournament.
- Brice Leverdez (born 9 April 1986 in La Garenne-Colombes, France) reached a career-high ranking of no. 19 in men's singles on 12 July 2018. He won the 2013 Mediterranean Games, and won the 2013 Scottish Open. He also won a silver medal in the men's singles at the 2019 European Games. The 2023 Orléans Masters was his last tournament.
- Liew Daren (born 6 August 1987 in Kuala Lumpur, Malaysia) reached a career-high ranking of no. 10 in men's singles on 7 March 2013. He won the 2012 French Open, and won the bronze medal at the 2018 World Championships. Liew was also part of the Malaysian team who won the silver medal at the 2014 Thomas Cup and the gold at the mixed team event at the 2014 Commonwealth Games. Liew announced his retirement on 26 April 2023, to focus full time on coaching fellow Malaysian player Lee Zii Jia. The 2023 Swiss Open was his last tournament.
- Puttita Supajirakul (born 29 March 1996 in Phitsanulok, Thailand) reached a career-high ranking of no. 9 in the women's doubles on 22 June 2017 and no. 34 in the mixed doubles on 27 November 2014. She announced her retirement from the Thai national team through her social media account on 30 May 2023. The 2023 Malaysia Masters was her last tournament.
- Wang Yilyu (born 8 November 1994 in Jiaxing, Zhejiang, China) reached a career-high ranking of no. 1 in the mixed doubles on 12 April 2018, and no. 10 in the men's doubles on 15 June 2017. BWF announced his retirement on 1 June 2023. The 2023 Indonesia Masters was his last tournament.
- Du Yue (born 15 February 1998 in Yichang, Hubei, China) reached a career-high ranking of no. 5 in the women's doubles on 17 March 2020, and no. 8 in the mixed doubles on 31 May 2018. BWF announced her retirement on 1 June 2023. The 2023 Spain Masters was her last tournament.
- Niluka Karunaratne (born 13 February 1985 in Galle, Sri Lanka) reached a career-high ranking of no. 34 in the men's singles on 27 June 2013. He announced his retirement on 1 October 2023.
