= Mohamed Abderrahime Belarbi =

Algerian badminton player (born 1992)

Personal information
- Born: 8 August 1992 (age 34)

Sport
- Country: Algeria
- Sport: Badminton
- Coached by: Nabil Lasmari

Men's singles & doubles
- Highest ranking: 259 (MS 18 February 2020); 83 (MD 1 September 2016); 243 (XD 18 February 2020)
- BWF profile
Medal record
Men's badminton
Representing Algeria
African Games
Silver medal – second place	2019 Rabat	Mixed team
African Championships
Gold medal – first place	2018 Algiers	Men's doubles
Silver medal – second place	2023 Benoni	Men's doubles
Bronze medal – third place	2013 Rose Hill	Men's doubles
Bronze medal – third place	2017 Benoni	Men's doubles
Bronze medal – third place	2022 Kampala	Men's doubles
Bronze medal – third place	2025 Douala	Men's doubles
Africa Mixed Team Championships
Gold medal – first place	2025 Douala	Mixed team
Silver medal – second place	2021 Kampala	Mixed team
Bronze medal – third place	2023 Benoni	Mixed team
Africa Men's Team Championships
Gold medal – first place	2018 Algiers	Men's team
Gold medal – first place	2020 Cairo	Men's team
Gold medal – first place	2022 Kampala	Men's team
Gold medal – first place	2024 Cairo	Men's team
Gold medal – first place	2026 Gaborone	Men's team
Bronze medal – third place	2016 Rose Hill	Men's team

Mohamed Abderrahime Belarbi (born 8 August 1992) is an Algerian badminton player who trained at the Chantecler club in Bordeaux, France. He competed at the 2010 Singapore Summer Youth Olympics. He was one of the 14 players selected for the Road to Rio Program, a program that aimed to help African badminton players to compete at the 2016 Olympic Games. Belarbi won the men's doubles title at the 2018 African Championships.

== Achievements ==
=== African Championships ===
Men's doubles
Year	Venue	Partner	Opponent	Score	Result
2013	National Badminton Centre, Rose Hill, Mauritius	(Algeria) Adel Hamek	(Nigeria) Enejoh Abah (Nigeria) Victor Makanju	21–12, 15–21, 19–21	Bronze
2017	John Barrable Hall, Benoni, South Africa	(Algeria) Adel Hamek	(South Africa) Andries Malan (South Africa) James Hilton McManus	17–21, 15–21	Bronze
2018	Salle OMS Harcha Hacéne, Algiers, Algeria	(Algeria) Adel Hamek	(Algeria) Koceila Mammeri (Algeria) Youcef Sabri Medel	21–18, 20–22, 21–18	Gold
2022	Lugogo Arena, Kampala, Uganda	(Algeria) Adel Hamek	(Egypt) Adham Hatem Elgamal (Egypt) Ahmed Salah	21–23, 17–21	Bronze
2023	John Barrable Hall, Benoni, South Africa	(Algeria) Adel Hamek	(South Africa) Jarred Elliott (South Africa) Robert Summers	13–21, 17–21	Silver
2025	Gymnase de Japoma, Douala, Cameroon	(Algeria) Adel Hamek	(Mauritius) Jean Bernard Bongout (Mauritius) Julien Paul	21–15, 13–21, 10–21	Bronze

=== BWF International Challenge/Series (1 title, 4 runners-up) ===
Men's doubles
Year	Tournament	Partner	Opponent	Score	Result
2014	Morocco International	(Algeria) Adel Hamek	(Turkey) Sinan Zorlu (Turkey) Yusuf Ramazan Bay	10–11, 6–11, 8–11	(silver) Runner-up
2015	Botswana International	(Algeria) Adel Hamek	(South Africa) Andries Malan (South Africa) Willem Viljoen	11–21, 8–21	(silver) Runner-up
2016	Rose Hill International	(Algeria) Adel Hamek	(South Africa) Andries Malan (South Africa) Willem Viljoen	18–21, 18–21	(silver) Runner-up
2018	Algeria International	(Algeria) Adel Hamek	(Algeria) Majed Yacine Balahoune (Algeria) Mohamed Amine Guelmaoui	21–18, 21–13	(gold) Winner
2023	Algeria International	(Algeria) Adel Hamek	(Algeria) Koceila Mammeri (Algeria) Youcef Sabri Medel	13–21, 25–27	(silver) Runner-up

BWF International Challenge tournament
BWF International Series tournament
BWF Future Series tournament
