= 2021 African Badminton Championships =

Tournament details
- Dates: 21–28 October 2021
- Edition: 24th
- Venue: MTN Arena
- Location: Kampala, Uganda

The 2021 African Badminton Championships was the continental badminton championships to crown the best players and teams across Africa. The tournament was held at the MTN Arena in Kampala, Uganda, from 21 to 28 October.

== Tournament ==
The 2021 African Badminton Championships were held in two separate events. The mixed team event, officially All Africa Mixed Team Championships 2021, was a continental tournament to crown the best team in Africa holding from 21 to 24 October. The individual event, officially All Africa Individual Championships 2021, was a continental tournament to crown the best players in Africa holding from 26 to 28 October. A total of 11 countries across Africa registered their players to compete at this event.

=== Venue ===
This tournament was held at the MTN Arena, Kampala with three courts.

=== Point distribution ===
The individual event of this tournament was graded based on the BWF points system for the BWF International Challenge event. Below is the table with the point distribution for each phase of the tournament.

Winner	Runner-up	3/4	5/8	9/16	17/32	33/64	65/128
4,000	3,400	2,800	2,200	1,520	920	360	170

== Medalists ==
Event	Gold	Silver	Bronze
Men's singles	(Egypt) Adham Hatem Elgamal	(Egypt) Ahmed Salah	(Egypt) Mohamed Mostafa Kamel
Men's singles	(Egypt) Adham Hatem Elgamal	(Egypt) Ahmed Salah	(Zambia) Kalombo Mulenga
Women's singles	(South Africa) Johanita Scholtz	(Egypt) Doha Hany	(Algeria) Mounib Celia
Women's singles	(South Africa) Johanita Scholtz	(Egypt) Doha Hany	(Uganda) Fadilah Mohamed Rafi
Men's doubles	(Algeria) Koceila Mammeri (Algeria) Youcef Sabri Medel	(Egypt) Abdelrahman Abdelhakim (Egypt) Ahmed Salah	(South Africa) Jarred Elliott (South Africa) Robert Summers
Men's doubles	(Algeria) Koceila Mammeri (Algeria) Youcef Sabri Medel	(Egypt) Abdelrahman Abdelhakim (Egypt) Ahmed Salah	(Uganda) Kenneth Comfort Mwambu (Uganda) Israel Wanagalya
Women's doubles	(South Africa) Amy Ackerman (South Africa) Johanita Scholtz	(Algeria) Mounib Celia (Algeria) Tanina Mammeri	(Uganda) Fadilah Mohamed Rafi (Uganda) Tracy Naluwooza
Women's doubles	(South Africa) Amy Ackerman (South Africa) Johanita Scholtz	(Algeria) Mounib Celia (Algeria) Tanina Mammeri	(Uganda) Husina Kobugabe (Uganda) Gladys Mbabazi
Mixed doubles	(Algeria) Koceila Mammeri (Algeria) Tanina Mammeri	(Egypt) Adham Hatem Elgamal (Egypt) Doha Hany	(South Africa) Robert White (South Africa) Deidre Laurens Jordaan
Mixed doubles	(Algeria) Koceila Mammeri (Algeria) Tanina Mammeri	(Egypt) Adham Hatem Elgamal (Egypt) Doha Hany	(South Africa) Jarred Elliott (South Africa) Amy Ackerman
Teams	Egypt; Abdelrahman Abdelhakim; Adham Hatem Elgamal; Mohamed Mostafa Kamel; Ahmed Salah; Nour Ahmed Youssri; Jana Ashraf; Doha Hany; Jana Abdelkader	Algeria; Mohamed Abderrahime Belarbi; Adel Hamek; Sifeddine Larbaoui; Koceila Mammeri; Youcef Sabri Medel; Mohamed Abdelaziz Ouchefoun; Halla Bouksani; Mounib Celia; Yasmina Chibah; Tanina Mammeri; Linda Mazri	Uganda; Friday Attama; Expedito Emuddu; Brian Kasirye; Muzafar Lubega; Kenneth Comfort Mwambu; Israel Wanagalya; Husina Kobugabe; Gladys Mbabazi; Fadilah Mohamed Rafi; Tracy Naluwooza; Mable Namakoye; Rajab Shamsa Mbira
Teams	Egypt; Abdelrahman Abdelhakim; Adham Hatem Elgamal; Mohamed Mostafa Kamel; Ahmed Salah; Nour Ahmed Youssri; Jana Ashraf; Doha Hany; Jana Abdelkader	Algeria; Mohamed Abderrahime Belarbi; Adel Hamek; Sifeddine Larbaoui; Koceila Mammeri; Youcef Sabri Medel; Mohamed Abdelaziz Ouchefoun; Halla Bouksani; Mounib Celia; Yasmina Chibah; Tanina Mammeri; Linda Mazri	South Africa; Jarred Elliott; Ruan Snyman; Robert Summers; Bongani Von Bodenstein; Robert White; Amy Ackerman; Demi Botha; Deidre Laurens Jordaan; Diane Olivier; Johanita Scholtz

=== Medal table ===
* Host nation (Uganda)

Rank	Nation	Gold	Silver	Bronze	Total
1	Egypt	2	4	1	7
2	Algeria	2	2	1	5
3	South Africa	2	0	4	6
4	Uganda*	0	0	5	5
5	Zambia	0	0	1	1
Totals (5 entries)		6	6	12	24

== Team event ==
=== Group A ===
Pos	Team	Pld	W	L	GF	GA	GD	PF	PA	PD	Pts	Qualification
1	Algeria	2	2	0	20	1	+19	438	246	+192	2	Advance to quarter-finals
2	Zambia	2	1	1	11	12	−1	374	410	−36	1	Advance to quarter-finals
3	Réunion	2	0	2	2	20	−18	298	454	−156	0	

Source: tournamentsoftware.com

==== Algeria vs Réunion ====
Algeria
5
MTN Arena - Lugogo Court 1
21 October 2021, 11:00 UTC+3

Réunion
0

			1	2	3
1	(Algeria) (Réunion)	Koceila Mammeri / Tanina Mammeri; Assing Aaron / Mansard Sylvie	21; 5	21; 17
2	(Algeria) (Réunion)	Halla Bouksani; Leperlier Estelle	21; 12	21; 4
3	(Algeria) (Réunion)	Adel Hamek; Loic Bertil	21; 14	21; 19
4	(Algeria) (Réunion)	Tanina Mammeri / Linda Mazri; Leperlier Estelle / Mansard Sylvie	21; 9	21; 14
5	(Algeria) (Réunion)	Koceila Mammeri / Youcef Sabri Medel; Assing Aaron / Loic Bertil	21; 5	21; 17

==== Zambia vs Réunion ====
Zambia
5
MTN Arena - Lugogo Court 1
21 October 2021, 15:00 UTC+3

Réunion
0

			1	2	3
1	(Zambia) (Réunion)	Kalombo Mulenga; Loic Bertil	21; 17	21; 17
2	(Zambia) (Réunion)	Chongo Ezra Mulenga / Ngandwe Miyambo; Assing Aaron / Mansard Sylvie	21; 16	15; 21	21; 8
3	(Zambia) (Réunion)	Elizaberth Chipeleme; Leperlier Estelle	21; 8	21; 12
4	(Zambia) (Réunion)	Chongo Ezra Mulenga / Kalombo Mulenga; Assing Aaron / Loic Bertil	21; 17	19; 21	21; 19
5	(Zambia) (Réunion)	Elizaberth Chipeleme / Ngandwe Miyambo; Leperlier Estelle / Mansard Sylvie	21; 10	21; 16

==== Algeria vs Zambia ====
Algeria
5
MTN Arena - Lugogo Court 1
22 October 2021, 15:00 UTC+3

Zambia
0

			1	2	3
1	(Algeria) (Zambia)	Halla Bouksani; Ngandwe Miyambo	21; 8	21; 7
2	(Algeria) (Zambia)	Adel Hamek; Kalombo Mulenga	21; 17	18; 21	21; 12
3	(Algeria) (Zambia)	Tanina Mammeri / Linda Mazri; Elizaberth Chipeleme / Ngandwe Miyambo	21; 12	21; 12
4	(Algeria) (Zambia)	Koceila Mammeri / Youcef Sabri Medel; Mwanza Edward / Chongo Ezra Mulenga	21; 8	21; 10
5	(Algeria) (Zambia)	Koceila Mammeri / Tanina Mammeri; Kalombo Mulenga / Elizaberth Chipeleme	21; 9	21; 14

=== Group B ===
Pos	Team	Pld	W	L	GF	GA	GD	PF	PA	PD	Pts	Qualification
1	South Africa	2	2	0	16	5	+11	411	282	+129	2	Advance to quarter-finals
2	Mauritius	2	1	1	14	6	+8	371	302	+69	1	Advance to quarter-finals
3	Botswana	2	0	2	1	20	−19	241	439	−198	0	

Source: tournamentsoftware.com

==== Mauritius vs Botswana ====
Mauritius
5
MTN Arena - Lugogo Court 2
21 October 2021, 11:00 UTC+3

Botswana
0

			1	2	3
1	(Mauritius) (Botswana)	Aatish Lubah / Kobita Dookhee; Perekisi Tshepo / Tessa Kabelo	21; 13	21; 9
2	(Mauritius) (Botswana)	Julien Paul; Tumisang Olekantse	21; 11	21; 13
3	(Mauritius) (Botswana)	Lorna Bodha; Tebogo Ndzinge	21; 15	21; 12
4	(Mauritius) (Botswana)	Jean Bernard Bongout / Aatish Lubah; Tumisang Olekantse / Perekisi Tshepo	21; 12	21; 11
5	(Mauritius) (Botswana)	Lorna Bodha / Kobita Dookhee; Tessa Kabelo / Tebogo Ndzinge	21; 9	21; 15

==== South Africa vs Botswana ====
South Africa
5
MTN Arena - Lugogo Court 1
22 October 2021, 09:00 UTC+3

Botswana
0

			1	2	3
1	(South Africa) (Botswana)	Robert White / Deidre Laurens Jordaan; Perekisi Tshepo / Tessa Kabelo	21; 9	21; 11
2	(South Africa) (Botswana)	Ruan Snyman; Tumisang Olekantse	21; 7	19; 21	21; 15
3	(South Africa) (Botswana)	Johanita Scholtz; Tebogo Ndzinge	21; 9	21; 4
4	(South Africa) (Botswana)	Bongani Von Bodenstein / Robert White; Tumisang Olekantse / Perekisi Tshepo	21; 15	21; 17
5	(South Africa) (Botswana)	Amy Ackerman / Johanita Scholtz; Tessa Kabelo / Tebogo Ndzinge	21; 8	21; 5

==== Mauritius vs South Africa ====
Mauritius
2
MTN Arena - Lugogo Court 2
22 October 2021, 15:00 UTC+3

South Africa
3

			1	2	3
1	(Mauritius) (South Africa)	Aatish Lubah / Kobita Dookhee; Jarred Elliott / Amy Ackerman	19; 21	22; 24
2	(Mauritius) (South Africa)	Ganesha Mungrah; Johanita Scholtz	10; 21	8; 21
3	(Mauritius) (South Africa)	Julien Paul; Ruan Snyman	21; 8	21; 16
4	(Mauritius) (South Africa)	Vilina Appiah / Kobita Dookhee; Amy Ackerman / Johanita Scholtz	7; 21	11; 21
5	(Mauritius) (South Africa)	Aatish Lubah / Julien Paul; Jarred Elliott / Robert Summers	21; 11	21; 18

=== Group C ===
Pos	Team	Pld	W	L	GF	GA	GD	PF	PA	PD	Pts	Qualification
1	Egypt	2	2	0	17	6	+11	458	228	+230	2	Advance to quarter-finals
2	Uganda (H)	2	1	1	16	7	+9	438	248	+190	1	Advance to quarter-finals
3	Ghana	2	0	2	0	20	−20	0	420	−420	0	Withdrew

Source: tournamentsoftware.com
(H) Host

==== Egypt vs Ghana ====
Egypt
5
MTN Arena - Lugogo Court 2
21 October 2021, 15:00 UTC+3

Ghana
0

			1	2	3
1	(Egypt) (Ghana)	Ahmed Salah –	21; 0	21; 0
2	(Egypt) (Ghana)	Doha Hany –	21; 0	21; 0
3	(Egypt) (Ghana)	Adham Hatem Elgamal / Mohamed Mostafa Kamel – / –	21; 0	21; 0
4	(Egypt) (Ghana)	Jana Ashraf / Jana Abdelkader – / –	21; 0	21; 0
5	(Egypt) (Ghana)	Adham Hatem Elgamal / Doha Hany – / –	21; 0	21; 0

==== Uganda vs Ghana ====
Uganda
5
MTN Arena - Lugogo Court 2
22 October 2021, 09:00 UTC+3

Ghana
0

			1	2	3
1	(Uganda) (Ghana)	Brian Kasirye –	21; 0	21; 0
2	(Uganda) (Ghana)	Gladys Mbabazi –	21; 0	21; 0
3	(Uganda) (Ghana)	Brian Kasirye / Israel Wanagalya – / –	21; 0	21; 0
4	(Uganda) (Ghana)	Husina Kobugabe / Gladys Mbabazi – / –	21; 0	21; 0
5	(Uganda) (Ghana)	Israel Wanagalya / Husina Kobugabe – / –	21; 0	21; 0

==== Egypt vs Uganda ====
Egypt
3
MTN Arena - Lugogo Court 3
22 October 2021, 15:00 UTC+3

Uganda
2

			1	2	3
1	(Egypt) (Uganda)	Adham Hatem Elgamal / Doha Hany; Israel Wanagalya / Husina Kobugabe	21; 15	21; 16
2	(Egypt) (Uganda)	Mohamed Mostafa Kamel; Brian Kasirye	18; 21	21; 5	6; 21
3	(Egypt) (Uganda)	Nour Ahmed Youssri; Gladys Mbabazi	20; 22	20; 22
4	(Egypt) (Uganda)	Adham Hatem Elgamal / Ahmed Salah; Brian Kasirye / Israel Wanagalya	21; 16	19; 21	21; 19
5	(Egypt) (Uganda)	Nour Ahmed Youssri / Doha Hany; Husina Kobugabe / Gladys Mbabazi	18; 21	21; 11	21; 18

=== Knockout stage ===
==== Bracket ====
The draw was conducted on 22 October 2021 after the last match of the group stage.

Quarter-finals		Semi-finals		Final
		Egypt	3
Mauritius	1	Uganda	0
Uganda	3			Egypt	3
Zambia	1			Algeria	1
South Africa	3	South Africa	2
		Algeria	3

==== Quarter-finals ====
===== Mauritius vs Uganda =====
Mauritius
1
MTN Arena - Lugogo Court 1
23 October 2021 09:00 UTC+3

Uganda
3

			1	2	3
1	(Mauritius) (Uganda)	Aatish Lubah / Kobita Dookhee; Brian Kasirye / Fadilah Mohamed Rafi	10; 21	15; 21
2	(Mauritius) (Uganda)	Ganesha Mungrah; Gladys Mbabazi	15; 21	11; 21
3	(Mauritius) (Uganda)	Julien Paul; Israel Wanagalya	21; 10	21; 7
4	(Mauritius) (Uganda)	Vilina Appiah / Kobita Dookhee; Husina Kobugabe / Gladys Mbabazi	15; 21	15; 21
5	(Mauritius) (Uganda)	Aatish Lubah / Julien Paul; Brian Kasirye / Israel Wanagalya				not played

===== Zambia vs South Africa =====
Zambia
1
MTN Arena - Lugogo Court 2
23 October 2021 09:00 UTC+3

South Africa
3

			1	2	3
1	(Zambia) (South Africa)	Chongo Ezra Mulenga / Elizaberth Chipeleme; Jarred Elliott / Amy Ackerman	11; 21	18; 21
2	(Zambia) (South Africa)	Ngandwe Miyambo; Johanita Scholtz	6; 21	4; 21
3	(Zambia) (South Africa)	Kalombo Mulenga; Ruan Snyman	22; 20	17; 21	21; 16
4	(Zambia) (South Africa)	Elizaberth Chipeleme / Ngandwe Miyambo; Amy Ackerman / Johanita Scholtz	6; 21	14; 21
5	(Zambia) (South Africa)	Chongo Ezra Mulenga / Kalombo Mulenga; Jarred Elliott / Robert Summers				not played

==== Semi-finals ====
===== Egypt vs Uganda =====
Egypt
3
MTN Arena - Lugogo Court 1
23 October 2021 15:00 UTC+3

Uganda
0

			1	2	3
1	(Egypt) (Uganda)	Adham Hatem Elgamal / Doha Hany; Brian Kasirye / Fadilah Mohamed Rafi	21; 18	21; 10
2	(Egypt) (Uganda)	Mohamed Mostafa Kamel; Israel Wanagalya	21; 14	16; 21	21; 18
3	(Egypt) (Uganda)	Nour Ahmed Youssri; Gladys Mbabazi	17; 21	21; 15	21; 16
4	(Egypt) (Uganda)	Adham Hatem Elgamal / Ahmed Salah; Brian Kasirye / Israel Wanagalya				not played
5	(Egypt) (Uganda)	Nour Ahmed Youssri / Doha Hany; Husina Kobugabe / Gladys Mbabazi				not played

===== South Africa vs Algeria =====
South Africa
2
MTN Arena - Lugogo Court 2
23 October 2021 15:00 UTC+3

Algeria
3

			1	2	3
1	(South Africa) (Algeria)	Jarred Elliott / Amy Ackerman; Koceila Mammeri / Tanina Mammeri	21; 23	13; 21
2	(South Africa) (Algeria)	Johanita Scholtz; Halla Bouksani	21; 15	21; 10
3	(South Africa) (Algeria)	Robert White; Adel Hamek	18; 21	15; 21
4	(South Africa) (Algeria)	Amy Ackerman / Johanita Scholtz; Tanina Mammeri / Linda Mazri	21; 17	15; 6		retired
5	(South Africa) (Algeria)	Jarred Elliott / Robert Summers; Koceila Mammeri / Youcef Sabri Medel	18; 21	15; 21

==== Final ====
===== Egypt vs Algeria =====
Egypt
3
MTN Arena - Lugogo Court 1
24 October 2021 14:00 UTC+3

Algeria
1

			1	2	3
1	(Egypt) (Algeria)	Ahmed Salah / Jana Ashraf; Koceila Mammeri / Tanina Mammeri	15; 21	9; 21
2	(Egypt) (Algeria)	Doha Hany; Halla Bouksani	21; 17	21; 18
3	(Egypt) (Algeria)	Adham Hatem Elgamal; Mohamed Abderrahime Belarbi	21; 17	17; 21	21; 19
4	(Egypt) (Algeria)	Nour Ahmed Youssri / Doha Hany; Mounib Celia / Tanina Mammeri	22; 20	21; 13
5	(Egypt) (Algeria)	Abdelrahman Abdelhakim / Ahmed Salah; Koceila Mammeri / Youcef Sabri Medel				not played

=== Final ranking ===
Pos	Team	Pld	W	L	Pts	MD	GD	PD	Final result
1st place, gold medalist(s)	Egypt	4	4	0	4	+11	+18	+257	Champions
2nd place, silver medalist(s)	Algeria	4	3	1	3	+9	+18	+189	Runners-up
3rd place, bronze medalist(s)	South Africa	4	3	1	3	+7	+14	+195	Eliminated in semi-finals
3rd place, bronze medalist(s)	Uganda	4	2	2	2	+3	+9	+184	Eliminated in semi-finals
5	Mauritius	3	1	2	1	+2	+4	+49	Eliminated in quarter-finals
6	Zambia	3	1	2	1	−2	−6	−100	Eliminated in quarter-finals
7	Réunion	2	0	2	0	−10	−18	−156	Eliminated in group stage
8	Botswana	2	0	2	0	−10	−19	−198	Eliminated in group stage
9	Ghana	Withdrew							Eliminated in group stage

== Individual event ==
=== Men's singles ===
==== Seeds ====
1. (Mauritius) Julien Paul (third round)
2. (Egypt) Adham Hatem Elgamal (champion)
3. (Algeria) Youcef Sabri Medel (third round)
4. (Egypt) Ahmed Salah (final)
5. (South Africa) Ruan Snyman (second round)
6. (Uganda) Brian Kasirye (quarter-finals)
7. (Algeria) Mohamed Abderrahime Belarbi (third round)
8. (Mauritius) Aatish Lubah (quarter-finals)

==== Finals ====
Semi-finals
(Egypt) Mohamed Mostafa Kamel	5^{r}
4	(Egypt) Ahmed Salah	17
(Zambia) Kalombo Mulenga	5	14
2	(Egypt) Adham Hatem Elgamal	21	21

Final
4	(Egypt) Ahmed Salah	14	14
2	(Egypt) Adham Hatem Elgamal	21	21

==== Top half ====
===== Section 1 =====
First Round
(Réunion) A Assing	15	18
(South Africa) R White	21	21

Second Round
1	(Mauritius) J Paul	21	21
(Democratic Republic of the Congo) M Tshizanga	9	7
(Ghana) K Alphous	14	13
(Egypt) M M Kamel	21	21
7	(Algeria) M A Belarbi	21	21
(Zambia) M Edward	12	11
(Uganda) K C Mwambu	6	8
(South Africa) R White	21	21

Third Round
1	(Mauritius) J Paul	18^{r}
(Egypt) M M Kamel	17
7	(Algeria) M A Belarbi	23	18	15
(South Africa) R White	21	21	21

Quarter-finals
(Egypt) M M Kamel	21	21
(South Africa) R White	11	18

===== Section 2 =====
First Round
(South Africa) R Summers	13	7
(Mauritius) J B Bongout	21	21
(Ghana) B A Botwe	19	21	21
(Zambia) M Donald	21	7	12

Second Round
4	(Egypt) A Salah	21	21
(Botswana) P Tshepo	11	17
(Zambia) C Mulenga	14	11
(Mauritius) J B Bongout	21	21
6	(Uganda) B Kasirye	20	21	21
(Algeria) A Hamek	22	10	13
(Botswana) T Olekantse	21	14	19
(Ghana) B A Botwe	15	21	21

Third Round
4	(Egypt) A Salah	21	21
(Mauritius) J B Bongout	14	6
6	(Uganda) B Kasirye	21	21
(Ghana) B A Botwe	17	9

Quarter-finals
4	(Egypt) A Salah	21	21
6	(Uganda) B Kasirye	13	13

==== Bottom half ====
===== Section 3 =====
First Round
(Republic of the Congo) G Ilouwo	13	15
(Ghana) A Tamakloe	21	21
(Zambia) K Mulenga	19	21	22
(Uganda) I Wanagalya	21	11	20

Second Round
(Ghana) A Tamakloe	13	16
(Algeria) M A Ouchefoun	21	21
(Egypt) A Abdelhakim	21	18	21
5	(South Africa) R Snyman	19	21	19
(Zambia) K Mulenga	21	21
(South Africa) B Von Bodenstein	12	13
(Republic of the Congo) S M S Mouanda	7	12
3	(Algeria) Y S Medel	21	21

Third Round
(Algeria) M A Ouchefoun	16	20
(Egypt) A Abdelhakim	21	22
(Zambia) K Mulenga	21	17	21
3	(Algeria) Y S Medel	16	21	18

Quarter-finals
(Egypt) A Abdelhakim	13	14
(Zambia) K Mulenga	21	21

===== Section 4 =====
First Round
(Algeria) S Larbaoui	16	21	21
(Mauritius) M Appiah	21	16	18
(Republic of the Congo) D N M Nzoussi	20	13
(Uganda) M Lubega	22	21

Second Round
(Algeria) S Larbaoui	21	21
(Ghana) A Abdul-Samad	14	16
(Réunion) L Bertil	13	13
8	(Mauritius) A Lubah	21	21
(Uganda) M Lubega	21	21
(Mauritius) T Pultoo	12	17
(Uganda) E Emuddu	7	14
2	(Egypt) A H Elgamal	21	21

Third Round
(Algeria) S Larbaoui	15	12
8	(Mauritius) A Lubah	21	21
(Uganda) M Lubega	8	16
2	(Egypt) A H Elgamal	21	21

Quarter-finals
8	(Mauritius) A Lubah	14	10
2	(Egypt) A H Elgamal	21	21

=== Women's singles ===
==== Seeds ====
1. (Egypt) Doha Hany (final)
2. (South Africa) Johanita Scholtz (champion)
3. (Egypt) Nour Ahmed Youssri (first round)
4. (Algeria) Halla Bouksani (second round)

==== Finals ====
Semi-finals
1	(Egypt) Doha Hany	21	23
(Algeria) Mounib Celia	11	21
(Uganda) Fadilah Mohamed Rafi	14	10
2	(South Africa) Johanita Scholtz	21	21

Final
1	(Egypt) Doha Hany	15	11
2	(South Africa) Johanita Scholtz	21	21

==== Top half ====
===== Section 1 =====
First Round
(Egypt) J Abdelkader	13	7
(Uganda) H Kobugabe	21	21
(Botswana) T Kabelo	15	15
(Mauritius) J Leung F S	21	21
(Uganda) G Mbabazi	22	21
(Mauritius) G Mungrah	20	12

Second Round
1	(Egypt) D Hany	20	21	21
(Uganda) H Kobugabe	22	8	18
(Mauritius) J Leung F S	15	10
(Uganda) G Mbabazi	21	21

Quarter-finals
1	(Egypt) D Hany	21	23
(Uganda) G Mbabazi	18	21

===== Section 2 =====
First Round
4	(Algeria) H Bouksani	21	21
(Réunion) E Leperlier	9	9
(Ghana) C Tornyenyor	17	4
(South Africa) D Laurens Jordaan	21	21
(Algeria) M Celia	21	21
(Zambia) N Miyambo	6	3
(South Africa) D Olivier	21	21
(Ghana) P Nantuo	10	13

Second Round
4	(Algeria) H Bouksani	21	18	19
(South Africa) D Laurens Jordaan	16	21	21
(Algeria) M Celia	21	21
(South Africa) D Olivier	15	18

Quarter-finals
(South Africa) D Laurens Jordaan	19	22
(Algeria) M Celia	21	24

==== Bottom half ====
===== Section 3 =====
First Round
(Réunion) S Mansard	21	14	10
(Botswana) T Ndzinge	14	21	21
(Ghana) R Quarcoo	10	11
(Mauritius) K Dookhee	21	21
(Uganda) M Namakoye	21	21
(Republic of the Congo) B Loubaki	5	8
(Uganda) F Mohamed Rafi	21	21
3	(Egypt) N Ahmed Youssri	18	19

Second Round
(Botswana) T Ndzinge	10	16
(Mauritius) K Dookhee	21	21
(Uganda) M Namakoye	10	11
(Uganda) F Mohamed Rafi	21	21

Quarter-finals
(Mauritius) K Dookhee	9	13
(Uganda) F Mohamed Rafi	21	21

===== Section 4 =====
First Round
(Egypt) J Ashraf	21	21
(Uganda) R S Mbira	17	14
(Mauritius) V Appiah	21	16	21
(Zambia) E Chipeleme	14	21	10
(Algeria) Y Chibah	15	21	16
(Uganda) T Naluwooza	21	8	21
(Algeria) T Mammeri	16	15
2	(South Africa) J Scholtz	21	21

Second Round
(Egypt) J Ashraf	21	21
(Mauritius) V Appiah	13	11
(Uganda) T Naluwooza	15	13
2	(South Africa) J Scholtz	21	21

Quarter-finals
(Egypt) J Ashraf	14	21	14
2	(South Africa) J Scholtz	21	13	21

=== Men's doubles ===
==== Seeds ====
1. (Algeria) Koceila Mammeri / Youcef Sabri Medel (champion)
2. (Mauritius) Aatish Lubah / Julien Paul (quarter-finals)
3. (Algeria) Adel Hamek / Mohamed Abderrahime Belarbi (quarter-finals)
4. (Mauritius) Jean Bernard Bongout / Tejraj Pultoo (quarter-finals)

==== Bracket ====
First Round
1	(Algeria) K Mammeri (Algeria) Y S Medel	21	21
(Ghana) B A Botwe (Ghana) A Tamakloe	16	11
(Zambia) C Mulenga (Zambia) K Mulenga	21	18	12
(Egypt) A H Elgamal (Egypt) M M Kamel	19	21	21
4	(Mauritius) J B Bongout (Mauritius) T Pultoo	19	21	21
(Uganda) B Kasirye (Uganda) M Lubega	21	18	13
(Botswana) T Olekantse (Botswana) P Tshepo	13	16
(South Africa) J Elliott (South Africa) R Summers	21	21
(Egypt) A Abdelhakim (Egypt) A Salah	21	22
(South Africa) B Von Bodenstein (South Africa) R White	19	20
(Réunion) A Assing (Réunion) L Bertil	12	14
3	(Algeria) M A Belarbi (Algeria) A Hamek	21	21
(Ghana) A Abdul-Samad (Ghana) K Alphous	19	29
(Uganda) K C Mwambu (Uganda) I Wanagalya	21	30
(Republic of the Congo) D N M Nzoussi (Republic of the Congo) S M S Mouanda	5	14
2	(Mauritius) A Lubah (Mauritius) J Paul	21	21

Quarter-finals
1	(Algeria) K Mammeri (Algeria) Y S Medel	21	21
(Egypt) A H Elgamal (Egypt) M M Kamel	12	8
4	(Mauritius) J B Bongout (Mauritius) T Pultoo	19	21
(South Africa) J Elliott (South Africa) R Summers	21	23
(Egypt) A Abdelhakim (Egypt) A Salah	21	21	21
3	(Algeria) M A Belarbi (Algeria) A Hamek	23	15	16
(Uganda) K C Mwambu (Uganda) I Wanagalya	w	/	o
2	(Mauritius) A Lubah (Mauritius) J Paul

Semi-finals
1	(Algeria) Koceila Mammeri (Algeria) Youcef Sabri Medel	21	21
(South Africa) Jarred Elliott (South Africa) Robert Summers	16	14
(Egypt) Abdelrahman Abdelhakim (Egypt) Ahmed Salah	21	21
(Uganda) Kenneth Comfort Mwambu (Uganda) Israel Wanagalya	18	16

Final
1	(Algeria) Koceila Mammeri (Algeria) Youcef Sabri Medel	21	21
(Egypt) Abdelrahman Abdelhakim (Egypt) Ahmed Salah	16	13

=== Women's doubles ===
==== Seeds ====
1. (Uganda) Fadilah Mohamed Rafi / Tracy Naluwooza (semi-finals)
2. (South Africa) Demi Botha / Deidre Laurens Jordaan (quarter-finals)

==== Bracket ====
First Round
(Réunion) E Leperlier (Réunion) S Mansard	15	26	21
(Zambia) E Chipeleme (Zambia) N Miyambo	21	24	15
(South Africa) A Ackerman (South Africa) J Scholtz	21	21
(Egypt) N Ahmed Youssri (Egypt) D Hany	13	12
(Mauritius) J Leung F S (Mauritius) G Mungrah	10	16
(Uganda) H Kobugabe (Uganda) G Mbabazi	21	21
(Ghana) P Nantuo (Ghana) R Quarcoo	13	10
(Egypt) J Ashraf (Egypt) J Abdelkader	21	21
(Algeria) M Celia (Algeria) T Mammeri	21	21
(Uganda) M Namakoye (Uganda) R S Mbira	12	9

Quarter-finals
1	(Uganda) F Mohamed Rafi (Uganda) T Naluwooza	21	21
(Réunion) E Leperlier (Réunion) S Mansard	5	11
(Botswana) T Kabelo (Botswana) T Ndzinge	10	5
(South Africa) A Ackerman (South Africa) J Scholtz	21	21
(Uganda) H Kobugabe (Uganda) G Mbabazi	21	21
(Egypt) J Ashraf (Egypt) J Abdelkader	16	12
(Algeria) M Celia (Algeria) T Mammeri	21	21
2	(South Africa) D Botha (South Africa) D Laurens Jordaan	5	15

Semi-finals
1	(Uganda) Fadilah Mohamed Rafi (Uganda) Tracy Naluwooza	8	21	11
(South Africa) Amy Ackerman (South Africa) Johanita Scholtz	21	18	21
(Uganda) Husina Kobugabe (Uganda) Gladys Mbabazi	19	17
(Algeria) Mounib Celia (Algeria) Tanina Mammeri	21	21

Final
(South Africa) Amy Ackerman (South Africa) Johanita Scholtz	23	21
(Algeria) Mounib Celia (Algeria) Tanina Mammeri	21	13

=== Mixed doubles ===
==== Seeds ====
1. (Egypt) Adham Hatem Elgamal / Doha Hany (final)
2. (Mauritius) Tejraj Pultoo / Kobita Dookhee (second round)
3. (Egypt) Mohamed Mostafa Kamel / Nour Ahmed Youssri (second round)
4. (Mauritius) Jean Bernard Bongout / Jemimah Leung For Sang (second round)

==== Finals ====
Semi-finals
1	(Egypt) Adham Hatem Elgamal (Egypt) Doha Hany	18	21	21
(South Africa) Robert White (South Africa) Deidre Laurens Jordaan	21	13	12
(South Africa) Jarred Elliott (South Africa) Amy Ackerman	21	10	10
(Algeria) Koceila Mammeri (Algeria) Tanina Mammeri	18	21	21

Final
1	(Egypt) Adham Hatem Elgamal (Egypt) Doha Hany	10	7
(Algeria) Koceila Mammeri (Algeria) Tanina Mammeri	21	21

==== Top half ====
===== Section 1 =====
First Round
(Algeria) M A Ouchefoun (Algeria) H Bouksani	15	21	21
(Ghana) A Tamakloe (Ghana) R Quarcoo	21	6	9
(Uganda) M Lubega (Uganda) M Namakoye	w	/	o
(Zambia) M Donald (Zambia) N Miyambo

Second Round
1	(Egypt) A H Elgamal (Egypt) D Hany	21	21
(Algeria) M A Ouchefoun (Algeria) H Bouksani	18	16
(Mauritius) M Appiah (Mauritius) V Appiah	21	21
(Uganda) M Lubega (Uganda) M Namakoye	16	15

Quarter-finals
1	(Egypt) A H Elgamal (Egypt) D Hany	17	21	21
(Mauritius) M Appiah (Mauritius) V Appiah	21	14	14

===== Section 2 =====
First Round
(Réunion) L Bertil (Réunion) E Leperlier	18	12
(Uganda) I Wanagalya (Uganda) G Mbabazi	21	21
(South Africa) R White (South Africa) D Laurens Jordaan	21	21
(Botswana) P Tshepo (Botswana) T Ndzinge	4	11

Second Round
4	(Mauritius) J B Bongout (Mauritius) J Leung F S	15	18
(Uganda) I Wanagalya (Uganda) G Mbabazi	21	21
(South Africa) B Von Bodenstein (South Africa) D Botha	21	17	16
(South Africa) R White (South Africa) D Laurens Jordaan	17	21	21

Quarter-finals
(Uganda) I Wanagalya (Uganda) G Mbabazi	14	21
(South Africa) R White (South Africa) D Laurens Jordaan	21	23

==== Bottom half ====
===== Section 3 =====
First Round
(Uganda) K C Mwambu (Uganda) H Kobugabe	17	14
(Zambia) K Mulenga (Zambia) E Chipeleme	21	21
(Réunion) A Assing (Réunion) S Mansard	15	13
(Uganda) E Emuddu (Uganda) F Mohamed Rafi	21	21
(South Africa) J Elliott (South Africa) A Ackerman	21	21
(Ghana) K Alphous (Ghana) C Tornyenyor	10	11

Second Round
(Zambia) K Mulenga (Zambia) E Chipeleme	12	21	18
(Uganda) E Emuddu (Uganda) F Mohamed Rafi	21	15	21
(South Africa) J Elliott (South Africa) A Ackerman	21	21
3	(Egypt) M M Kamel (Egypt) N Ahmed Youssri	15	8

Quarter-finals
(Uganda) E Emuddu (Uganda) F Mohamed Rafi	21	9	17
(South Africa) J Elliott (South Africa) A Ackerman	17	21	21

===== Section 4 =====
First Round
(Ghana) A Abdul-Samad (Ghana) P Nantuo	13	11
(Egypt) A Salah (Egypt) J Ashraf	21	21
(Algeria) K Mammeri (Algeria) T Mammeri	21	21
(Republic of the Congo) S Mouanda (Republic of the Congo) B Loubaki	8	9

Second Round
(Egypt) A Salah (Egypt) J Ashraf	21	21
(Botswana) T Olekantse (Botswana) T Kabelo	10	10
(Algeria) K Mammeri (Algeria) T Mammeri	21	21
2	(Mauritius) T Pultoo (Mauritius) K Dookhee	10	16

Quarter-finals
(Egypt) A Salah (Egypt) J Ashraf	21	23	6
(Algeria) K Mammeri (Algeria) T Mammeri	18	25	21
