= Deidré Laurens =

South African badminton player

Deidré Laurens Jordaan
Personal information
- Born: 29 March 1995 (age 31)
- Height: 1.68 m (5 ft 6 in)

Sport
- Country: South Africa
- Sport: Badminton
- Handedness: Right

Women's doubles
- Highest ranking: 55 (with Amy Ackerman) (27 August 2024)
- Current ranking: 72 (with Amy Ackerman) (3 December 2024)
- BWF profile
Medal record
Women's badminton
Representing South Africa
African Championships
Gold medal – first place	2023 Benoni	Women's doubles
Gold medal – first place	2024 Cairo	Women's doubles
Silver medal – second place	2022 Kampala	Women's doubles
Bronze medal – third place	2021 Kampala	Mixed doubles
Bronze medal – third place	2023 Benoni	Mixed doubles
Bronze medal – third place	2021 Kampala	Mixed team
Africa Women's Team Championships
Gold medal – first place	2024 Cairo	Women's team
Bronze medal – third place	2022 Kampala	Women's team

Deidré Laurens Jordaan (born 29 March 1995) is a South African badminton player.

== Career ==
She started playing badminton with the influence from both her father and grandfather. At the age of 17, she torn her Anterior cruciate ligament while competing in Junior circuit tournaments which forced her to remain out of competition for several years. She returned in 2017 while she was attending university. In 2020, she was selected to represent South African national team for the first time. She is a two-time African champion with her doubles partner Amy Ackerman and has won number of international titles. Laurens is the chair of Badminton Confederation of Africa Athletes' Commission, a position she has held since 2023.

== Achievements ==
=== African Championships ===
Women's doubles
Year	Venue	Partner	Opponent	Score	Result
2022	Lugogo Arena; Kampala, Uganda	(South Africa) Amy Ackerman	(Mauritius) Lorna Bodha (Mauritius) Kobita Dookhe	18–21, 20–22	Silver
2023	John Barrable Hall; Benoni, South Africa	(South Africa) Amy Ackerman	(Algeria) Yasmina Chibah (Algeria) Linda Mazri	21–19, 21–12	Gold
2024	Cairo Stadium Indoor Halls Complex; Cairo, Egypt	(South Africa) Amy Ackerman	(Uganda) Husina Kobugabe (Uganda) Gladys Mbabazi	21–11, 21–15	Gold

Mixed doubles
Year	Venue	Partner	Opponent	Score	Result
2021	MTN Arena; Kampala, Uganda	(South Africa) Robert White	(Egypt) Adham Hatem Elgamal (Egypt) Doha Hany	21–18, 13–21, 12–21	Bronze
2023	John Barrable Hall; Benoni, South Africa	(South Africa) Robert White	(Egypt) Adham Hatem Elgamal (Egypt) Doha Hany	10–21, 18–21	Bronze

=== BWF International (10 titles, 6 runner-up) ===
Women's singles
Year	Tournament	Opponent	Score	Result
2021	Benin International	(South Africa) Johanita Scholtz	11–21, 10–21	(silver) Runner-up
2021	South Africa International	(South Africa) Johanita Scholtz	10–21, 11–21	(silver) Runner-up

Women's doubles
Year	Tournament	Partner	Opponent	Score	Result
2021	Benin International	(South Africa) Demi Botha	(South Africa) Amy Ackerman (South Africa) Dinae Olivier	21–16, 21–19	(gold) Winner
2021	South Africa International	(South Africa) Megan de Beer	(South Africa) Amy Ackerman (South Africa) Johanita Scholtz	17–21, 11–21	(silver) Runner-up
2022	Egypt International	(South Africa) Amy Ackerman	(Italy) Martina Corsini (Italy) Judith Mair	5–21, 13–21	(silver) Runner-up
2022	Zambia International	(South Africa) Amy Ackerman	(Azerbaijan) Keisha Fatimah Azzahra (Azerbaijan) Era Maftuha	12–21, 8–21	(silver) Runner-up
2022	Botswana International	(South Africa) Amy Ackerman	(Mauritius) Lorna Bodha (Mauritius) Kobita Dookhe	21–10, 21–11	(gold) Winner
2023	Algeria International	(South Africa) Amy Ackerman	(Algeria) Yasmina Chibah (Algeria) Linda Mazri	21–19, 21–12	(gold) Winner
2023	Zambia International	(South Africa) Amy Ackerman	(Uganda) Husina Kobugabe (Uganda) Gladys Mbabazi	21–13, 21–15	(gold) Winner
2023	Botswana International	(South Africa) Amy Ackerman	(Maldives) Aminath Nabeeha Abdul Razzaq (Maldives) Fathimath Nabaaha Abdul Razzaq	21–13, 20–22, 21–18	(gold) Winner
2023	South Africa International	(South Africa) Amy Ackerman	(South Africa) Megan de Beer (South Africa) Johanita Scholtz	21–14, 21–19	(gold) Winner
2024	Botswana International	(South Africa) Amy Ackerman	(Sri Lanka) Hasini Ambalangodage (Sri Lanka) Hasara Wijayarathne	18–21, 20–22	(silver) Runner-up
2024	South Africa International	(South Africa) Amy Ackerman	(Sri Lanka) Hasini Ambalangodage (Sri Lanka) Hasara Wijayarathne	21–14, 21–14	(gold) Winner

Mixed doubles
Year	Tournament	Partner	Opponent	Score	Result
2021	Benin International	(South Africa) Jarred Elliott	(South Africa) Cameron Coetzer (South Africa) Amy Ackerman	21–17, 22–20	(gold) Winner
2021	South Africa International	(South Africa) Robert White	(South Africa) Jarred Elliott (South Africa) Amy Ackerman	Walkover	(gold) Winner
2023	South Africa International	(South Africa) Robert White	(Egypt) Adham Hatem Elgamal (Egypt) Doha Hany	10–21, 21–17, 21–18	(gold) Winner

BWF International Challenge tournament
BWF International Series tournament
BWF Future Series tournament
