= Tanina Mammeri =

Algerian badminton player (born 2003)

Tanina Mammeri تانينا معمري
Personal information
- Born: Tanina Violette Mammeri; 17 June 2003 (age 23) Courcouronnes, France
- Height: 1.74 m (5 ft 9 in)

Sport
- Country: Algeria
- Sport: Badminton
- Handedness: Right

Mixed doubles
- Highest ranking: 41 (with Koceila Mammeri, 29 October 2024)
- Current ranking: 90 (with Koceila Mammeri, 25 August 2026)
- BWF profile
Medal record
Women's badminton
Representing Algeria
African Games
Gold medal – first place	2023 Accra	Mixed doubles
Silver medal – second place	2023 Accra	Women's doubles
African Championships
Gold medal – first place	2021 Kampala	Mixed doubles
Gold medal – first place	2022 Kampala	Mixed doubles
Gold medal – first place	2023 Benoni	Mixed doubles
Gold medal – first place	2024 Cairo	Mixed doubles
Gold medal – first place	2025 Douala	Mixed doubles
Gold medal – first place	2026 Gaborone	Mixed doubles
Silver medal – second place	2021 Kampala	Women's doubles
Africa Mixed Team Championships
Gold medal – first place	2025 Douala	Mixed team
Silver medal – second place	2021 Kampala	Mixed team
Bronze medal – third place	2023 Benoni	Mixed team
Africa Women's Team Championships
Bronze medal – third place	2024 Cairo	Women's team
Bronze medal – third place	2026 Gaborone	Women's team
Arab Games
Gold medal – first place	2023 Algiers	Mixed doubles
Silver medal – second place	2023 Algiers	Women's doubles
Bronze medal – third place	2023 Algiers	Women's singles
Mediterranean Games
Bronze medal – third place	2026 Taranto	Mixed doubles

Tanina Violette Mammeri (Arabic: تانينا فيوليت معمري; born 17 June 2003) is a badminton player. Born in France, she represents Algeria internationally. She won the African games in 2023 and is a 4-time African champion with her brother Koceila Mammeri. Both of them represented their country at the 2024 Summer Olympics in the mixed doubles discipline.

== Achievements ==
=== African Games ===
Women's doubles
Year	Venue	Partner	Opponent	Score	Result
2023	Borteyman Sports Complex; Accra, Ghana	(Algeria) Halla Bouksani	(Uganda) Husina Kobugabe (Uganda) Gladys Mbabazi	21–23, 14–21	Silver

Mixed doubles
Year	Venue	Partner	Opponent	Score	Result
2023	Borteyman Sports Complex; Accra, Ghana	(Algeria) Koceila Mammeri	(Egypt) Adham Hatem Elgamal (Egypt) Doha Hany	21–11, 21–15	Gold

=== African Championships ===
Women's doubles
Year	Venue	Partner	Opponent	Score	Result
2021	MTN Arena, Kampala, Uganda	(Algeria) Mounib Celia	(South Africa) Amy Ackerman (South Africa) Johanita Scholtz	21–23, 13–21	Silver

Mixed doubles
Year	Venue	Partner	Opponent	Score	Result
2021	MTN Arena, Kampala, Uganda	(Algeria) Koceila Mammeri	(Egypt) Adham Hatem Elgamal (Egypt) Doha Hany	21–10, 21–7	Gold
2022	Lugogo Arena, Kampala, Uganda	(Algeria) Koceila Mammeri	(South Africa) Jarred Elliott (South Africa) Amy Ackerman	21–13, 21–14	Gold
2023	John Barrable Hall, Benoni, South Africa	(Algeria) Koceila Mammeri	(Egypt) Adham Hatem Elgamal (Egypt) Doha Hany	21–15, 21–13	Gold
2024	Cairo Stadium Indoor Halls Complex, Cairo, Egypt	(Algeria) Koceila Mammeri	(Egypt) Adham Hatem Elgamal (Egypt) Doha Hany	21–23, 21–16, 21–11	Gold
2025	Gymnase de Japoma, Douala, Cameroon	(Algeria) Koceila Mammeri	(Egypt) Adham Hatem Elgamal (Egypt) Doha Hany	Walkover	Gold
2026	Royal Aria, Gaborone, Botswana	(Algeria) Koceila Mammeri	(South Africa) Caden Kakora (South Africa) Amy Ackerman	21–12, 21–9	Gold

=== Mediterranean Games ===
Mixed doubles
Year	Venue	Partner	Opponent	Score	Result	Ref.
2026	Palazzetto dello Sport; Francavilla Fontana, Italy	(Algeria) Koceila Mammeri	(France) Natan Begga (France) Elsa Jacob	21–23, 17–21	Bronze	

=== BWF International Challenge/Series (13 titles, 5 runners-up) ===
Mixed doubles
Year	Tournament	Partner	Opponent	Score	Result
2022	Uganda International	(Algeria) Koceila Mammeri	(India) Senthil Vel Govindarasu (Malaysia) Venosha Radhakrishnan	19–21, 21–18, 22–20	(gold) Winner
2022	Maldives International	(Algeria) Koceila Mammeri	(India) Rohan Kapoor (India) N. Sikki Reddy	16–21, 18–21	(silver) Runner-up
2023	Santo Domingo Open	(Algeria) Koceila Mammeri	(Mexico) Luis Montoya (Mexico) Miriam Rodríguez	21–13, 21–19	(gold) Winner
2023	Mauritius International	(Algeria) Koceila Mammeri	(India) Hariharan Amsakarunan (India) Varshini Viswanath Sri	16–21, 17–21	(silver) Runner-up
2023	Réunion Open	(Algeria) Koceila Mammeri	(India) Hariharan Amsakarunan (India) Varshini Viswanath Sri	21–19, 21–14	(gold) Winner
2023	Brazil International	(Algeria) Koceila Mammeri	(Brazil) Davi Silva (Brazil) Sania Lima	12–21, 15–21	(silver) Runner-up
2023	Cameroon International	(Algeria) Koceila Mammeri	(Slovenia) Miha Ivančič (Slovenia) Petra Polanc	21–17, 21–17	(gold) Winner
2023	Uganda International	(Algeria) Koceila Mammeri	(South Africa) Caden Kakora (South Africa) Johanita Scholtz	21–17, 21–18	(gold) Winner
2023	Egypt International	(Algeria) Koceila Mammeri	(Germany) Jones Ralfy Jansen (Germany) Julia Meyer	19–21, 18–21	(silver) Runner-up
2023	Algeria International	(Algeria) Koceila Mammeri	(Switzerland) Hugo Chanthakesone (Switzerland) Leila Zarrouk	21–12, 21–6	(gold) Winner
2023	Guatemala International	(Algeria) Koceila Mammeri	(Mexico) Luis Montoya (Mexico) Miriam Rodríguez	21–17, 16–21, 21–19	(gold) Winner
2023	Zambia International	(Algeria) Koceila Mammeri	(Mauritius) Melvin Appiah (Mauritius) Vilina Appiah	21–5, 21–13	(gold) Winner
2024	Egypt International	(Algeria) Koceila Mammeri	(India) Bokka Navaneeth (India) Ritika Thaker	23–21, 21–17	(gold) Winner
2024	Algeria International	(Algeria) Koceila Mammeri	(Portugal) Bruno Carvalho (Portugal) Mariana Paiva	21–17, 21–11	(gold) Winner
2025	Algeria International	(Algeria) Koceila Mammeri	(Switzerland) Nicolas Franconville (Switzerland) Julie Franconville	21–15, 21–12	(gold) Winner
2025	Egypt International	(Algeria) Koceila Mammeri	(France) Aymeric Tores (Netherlands) Kirsten de Wit	21–16, 21–18	(gold) Winner
2026	Cameroon International	(Algeria) Koceila Mammeri	(India) Dhruv Rawat (India) K. Maneesha	21–23, 17–21	(silver) Runner-up
2026	Peru International	(Algeria) Koceila Mammeri	(Canada) Jonathan Lai (Canada) Crystal Lai	21–18, 18–21, 21–15	(gold) Winner

BWF International Challenge tournament
BWF International Series tournament
BWF Future Series tournament
