= 2022 African Badminton Championships =

Tournament details
- Dates: 18–20 February 2022
- Edition: 25th
- Venue: Lugogo Arena
- Location: Kampala, Uganda

The 2022 African Badminton Championships was the continental badminton championships to crown the best players and teams across Africa. The tournament was held at the Lugogo Arena in Kampala, Uganda, from 18 to 20 February 2022.

== Medalists ==
Event	Gold	Silver	Bronze
Men's singles	(Nigeria) Anuoluwapo Juwon Opeyori	(Uganda) Brian Kasirye	(Egypt) Adham Hatem Elgamal
Men's singles	(Nigeria) Anuoluwapo Juwon Opeyori	(Uganda) Brian Kasirye	(Algeria) Adel Hamek
Women's singles	(Egypt) Nour Ahmed Youssri	(Egypt) Doha Hany	(Uganda) Husina Kobugabe
Women's singles	(Egypt) Nour Ahmed Youssri	(Egypt) Doha Hany	(Egypt) Hana Tarek
Men's doubles	(Algeria) Koceila Mammeri (Algeria) Youcef Sabri Medel	(Egypt) Adham Hatem Elgamal (Egypt) Ahmed Salah	(Egypt) Abdelrahman Abdelhakim (Egypt) Mohamed Mostafa Kamel
Men's doubles	(Algeria) Koceila Mammeri (Algeria) Youcef Sabri Medel	(Egypt) Adham Hatem Elgamal (Egypt) Ahmed Salah	(Algeria) Mohamed Abderrahime Belarbi (Algeria) Adel Hamek
Women's doubles	(Mauritius) Lorna Bodha (Mauritius) Kobita Dookhee	(South Africa) Amy Ackerman (South Africa) Deidre Laurens Jordaan	(Réunion) Audrey Lebon (Réunion) Leperlier Estelle
Women's doubles	(Mauritius) Lorna Bodha (Mauritius) Kobita Dookhee	(South Africa) Amy Ackerman (South Africa) Deidre Laurens Jordaan	(Egypt) Nour Ahmed Youssri (Egypt) Doha Hany
Mixed doubles	(Algeria) Koceila Mammeri (Algeria) Tanina Mammeri	(South Africa) Jarred Elliott (South Africa) Amy Ackerman	(Réunion) Chan Fung Ting Xavier (Réunion) Ly-Hoa Chai
Mixed doubles	(Algeria) Koceila Mammeri (Algeria) Tanina Mammeri	(South Africa) Jarred Elliott (South Africa) Amy Ackerman	(Mauritius) Jean Bernard Bongout (Mauritius) Lorna Bodha

=== Medal table ===
* Host nation (Uganda)

Rank	Nation	Gold	Silver	Bronze	Total
1	Algeria	2	0	2	4
2	Egypt	1	2	4	7
3	Mauritius	1	0	1	2
4	Nigeria	1	0	0	1
5	South Africa	0	2	0	2
6	Uganda*	0	1	1	2
7	Réunion	0	0	2	2
Totals (7 entries)		5	5	10	20

== Tournament ==
The 2022 African Badminton Championships is a continental tournament to crown the best players in Africa.

=== Venue ===
This tournament was held at the Lugogo Arena in Kampala, Uganda.

=== Point distribution ===
The individual event of this tournament is graded based on the BWF points system for the BWF International Challenge event. Below is the table with the point distribution for each phase of the tournament.

Winner	Runner-up	3/4	5/8	9/16	17/32	33/64	65/128
4,000	3,400	2,800	2,200	1,520	920	360	170

== Men's singles ==
=== Seeds ===
1. (Egypt) Adham Hatem Elgamal (semi-finals)
2. (Nigeria) Anuoluwapo Juwon Opeyori (champion)
3. (Egypt) Ahmed Salah (quarter-finals)
4. (Algeria) Youcef Sabri Medel (quarter-finals)
5. (South Africa) Ruan Snyman (second round)
6. (Uganda) Brian Kasirye (final)
7. (Mauritius) Aatish Lubah (second round)
8. (Algeria) Mohamed Abderrahime Belarbi (second round)

=== Finals ===
Semi-finals
1	(Egypt) Adham Hatem Elgamal	17	21	15
6	(Uganda) Brian Kasirye	21	16	21
(Algeria) Adel Hamek	18	18
2	(Nigeria) Anuoluwapo Juwon Opeyori	21	21

Final
6	(Uganda) Brian Kasirye	14	21
2	(Nigeria) Anuoluwapo Juwon Opeyori	21	23

=== Top half ===
==== Section 1 ====
First Round
(Mauritius) M Appiah	21	21	20
(South Africa) R White	19	23	22
(Seychelles) J Renaud	11	12
(Botswana) K Godknows	21	21
(Zimbabwe) D Matyanga	7	8
(Mauritius) J B Bongout	21	21
(Uganda) P Makande	21	21
(Cameroon) M H Assembe	11	12

Second Round
1	(Egypt) A H Elgamal	21	18	21
(South Africa) R White	10	21	17
(Ghana) R Quarcoo
(Botswana) K Godknows	w	/	o
5	(South Africa) R Snyman	20	18
(Mauritius) J B Bongout	22	21
(Uganda) F Attama	21	25
(Uganda) P Makande	14	23

Third Round
1	(Egypt) A H Elgamal	21	21
(Botswana) K Godknows	6	15
(Mauritius) J B Bongout	21	21
(Uganda) F Attama	13	13

Quarter-finals
1	(Egypt) A H Elgamal	21	21
(Mauritius) J B Bongout	9	19

==== Section 2 ====
First Round
(Ghana) A Tamakloe
(Mozambique) I I Mossagy	w	/	o
(Benin) C C Ahouangassi	11	13
(Egypt) A A El Khateeb	21	21
(Mauritius) T Pultoo	21	21
(Benin) P Adomahou	15	11
(Benin) C M Codjo Kpanou	6	15
(Uganda) A Muyanja	21	21
(Réunion) N Loic Antoine	w	/	o
(Ghana) K Alphous

Second Round
4	(Algeria) Y S Medel	21	21
(Mozambique) I I Mossagy	14	10
(Mauritius) K R Nundah	13	21	12
(Egypt) A A El Khateeb	21	16	21
6	(Uganda) B Kasirye	21	21
(Mauritius) T Pultoo	14	12
(Uganda) A Muyanja	21	21
(Réunion) N Loic Antoine	17	8

Third Round
4	(Algeria) Y S Medel	21	21
(Egypt) A A El Khateeb	19	13
6	(Uganda) B Kasirye	21	21
(Uganda) A Muyanja	11	15

Quarter-finals
4	(Algeria) Y S Medel	15	19
6	(Uganda) B Kasirye	21	21

=== Bottom half ===
==== Section 3 ====
First Round
(Réunion) A Aaron	w	/	o
(Ghana) B Aduonu
(Ghana) A Abdul-Samad
(Zimbabwe) A Dziva	w	/	o
(Algeria) A Hamek	21	21
(Botswana) C Mosweu	14	14
(Réunion) Chan F T X	20	19
(Egypt) M M Kamel	22	21
(South Africa) C Kakora	21	21
(Seychelles) Jie L	14	17

Second Round
(Réunion) A Aaron	21	21
(Zimbabwe) A Dziva	13	15
(Algeria) A Hamek	21	21
7	(Mauritius) A Lubah	11	17
(Egypt) M M Kamel	22	21
(Algeria) S Larbaoui	20	10
(South Africa) C Kakora	16	21	14
3	(Egypt) A Salah	21	14	21

Third Round
(Réunion) A Aaron	9	13
(Algeria) A Hamek	21	21
(Egypt) M M Kamel	14	16
3	(Egypt) A Salah	21	21

Quarter-finals
(Algeria) A Hamek	21	21
3	(Egypt) A Salah	17	13

==== Section 4 ====
First Round
(Benin) O A Fano-Dosh	21	16	21
(Réunion) G Grondin	19	21	19
(Uganda) K C Mwambu	21	21
(Cameroon) A E O Ndimako	12	13
(Zimbabwe) P Mateme	8	6
(Uganda) I Wanagalya	21	21
(South Africa) R Summers	21	21
(Zimbabwe) T Mathe	16	18
(Algeria) M A Ouchefoun	21	19	21
(Egypt) A Abdelhakim	16	21	18

Second Round
(Benin) O A Fano-Dosh	21	21
(Uganda) K C Mwambu	18	16
(Uganda) I Wanagalya	21	18	21
8	(Algeria) M A Belarbi	16	21	11
(South Africa) R Summers	21	21
(Zimbabwe) T Muvavi	11	7
(Algeria) M A Ouchefoun	16	11
2	(Nigeria) A J Opeyori	21	21

Third Round
(Benin) O A Fano-Dosh	17	22	14
(Uganda) I Wanagalya	21	20	21
(South Africa) R Summers	21	19	18
2	(Nigeria) A J Opeyori	16	21	21

Quarter-finals
(Uganda) I Wanagalya	21	10	11
2	(Nigeria) A J Opeyori	18	21	21

== Women's singles ==
=== Seeds ===
1. (Egypt) Doha Hany (final)
2. (Egypt) Nour Ahmed Youssri (champion)
3. (Egypt) Jana Ashraf (withdrew)
4. (Algeria) Halla Bouksani (third round)
5. (South Africa) Deidre Laurens Jordaan (quarter-finals)
6. (Algeria) Linda Mazri (second round)
7. (Algeria) Yasmina Chibah (quarter-finals)
8. (South Africa) Diane Olivier (second round)

=== Finals ===
Semi-finals
1	(Egypt) Doha Hany	21	22
(Uganda) Husina Kobugabe	18	20
(Egypt) Hana Tarek	11	13
2	(Egypt) Nour Ahmed Youssri	21	21

Final
1	(Egypt) Doha Hany	16	16
2	(Egypt) Nour Ahmed Youssri	21	21

=== Top half ===
==== Section 1 ====
First Round

Second Round
1	(Egypt) D Hany	w	/	o
(Ghana) P Nantuo
(South Africa) A Ackerman	21	21
(Réunion) L Estelle	4	9
7	(Algeria) Y Chibah	21	21
(Zimbabwe) N Kopolo	3	2
(Uganda) T Naluwooza	21	21
(Cameroon) M C L Akoumba Ze	12	5

Third Round
1	(Egypt) D Hany	19	21	21
(South Africa) A Ackerman	21	8	14
7	(Algeria) Y Chibah	21	21
(Uganda) T Naluwooza	16	18

Quarter-finals
1	(Egypt) D Hany	21	21
7	(Algeria) Y Chibah	18	15

==== Section 2 ====
First Round

Second Round
4	(Algeria) H Bouksani	21	21
(Mauritius) V Appiah	13	9
(Algeria) M Ouchefoun	17	21	10
(Uganda) H Kobugabe	21	6	21
5	(South Africa) D Laurens Jordaan	21	21
(Réunion) M Lepetit	9	18
(Mauritius) T Bhurtun	8	16
(Algeria) T V Mammeri	21	21

Third Round
4	(Algeria) H Bouksani	13	21	13
(Uganda) H Kobugabe	21	19	21
5	(South Africa) D Laurens Jordaan	21	17	21
(Algeria) T V Mammeri	16	21	14

Quarter-finals
(Uganda) H Kobugabe	21	21
5	(South Africa) D Laurens Jordaan	19	18

=== Bottom half ===
==== Section 3 ====
First Round
(Mauritius) L L Chiniah	20	14
(Uganda) R S Mbira	21	21

Second Round
(Uganda) R S Mbira	21	18	21
(Uganda) B Awor	17	21	14
(Egypt) H Tarek	20	21	21
8	(South Africa) D Olivier	22	15	12
(Réunion) L-H Chai	21	21
(Zimbabwe) R Ruwende	10	4
(Zimbabwe) A Sibiya	w	/	o
3	(Egypt) J Ashraf

Third Round
(Uganda) R S Mbira	15	11
(Egypt) H Tarek	21	21
(Réunion) L-H Chai	w	/	o
(Zimbabwe) A Sibiya

Quarter-finals
(Egypt) H Tarek	21	21
(Réunion) L-H Chai	9	8

==== Section 4 ====
First Round

Second Round
(Réunion) A Lebon	21	17	12
(Mauritius) L Bodha	15	21	21
(Uganda) F Mohamed Rafi	21	21
6	(Algeria) L Mazri	10	13
(Uganda) S Wanyana	w	/	o
(Ghana) C Tornyenyor
(Cameroon) M P G Anamba	10	9
2	(Egypt) N A Youssri	21	21

Third Round
(Mauritius) L Bodha	13	14
(Uganda) F Mohamed Rafi	21	21
(Uganda) S Wanyana	7	16
2	(Egypt) N A Youssri	21	21

Quarter-finals
(Uganda) F Mohamed Rafi	20	16
2	(Egypt) N A Youssri	22	21

== Men's doubles ==
=== Seeds ===
1. (Algeria) Koceila Mammeri / Youcef Sabri Medel (champion)
2. (Egypt) Adham Hatem Elgamal / Ahmed Salah (final)
3. (Algeria) Mohamed Abderrahime Belarbi / Adel Hamek (semi-finals)
4. (Egypt) Abdelrahman Abdelhakim / Mohamed Mostafa Kamel (semi-finals)

=== Finals ===
Semi-finals
1	(Algeria) Koceila Mammeri (Algeria) Youcef Sabri Medel	21	21
4	(Egypt) Abdelrahman Abdelhakim (Egypt) Mohamed Mostafa Kamel	17	13
3	(Algeria) Mohamed Abderrahime Belarbi (Algeria) Adel Hamek	21	17
2	(Egypt) Adham Hatem Elgamal (Egypt) Ahmed Salah	23	21

Final
1	(Algeria) Koceila Mammeri (Algeria) Youcef Sabri Medel	21	21	21
2	(Egypt) Adham Hatem Elgamal (Egypt) Ahmed Salah	23	19	18

=== Top half ===
==== Section 1 ====
First round
1	(Algeria) K Mammeri (Algeria) Y S Medel
Bye
(South Africa) J Elliott (South Africa) R Summers
Bye
(Uganda) F Attama (Uganda) P Makande
Bye
(Benin) C C Ahouangassi (Benin) O A Fano-Dosh	21	14	21
(Zimbabwe) T Mathe (Zimbabwe) D Matyanga	16	21	14

Second round
1	(Algeria) K Mammeri (Algeria) Y S Medel	21	21
(South Africa) J Elliott (South Africa) R Summers	18	15
(Uganda) F Attama (Uganda) P Makande	21	21
(Benin) C C Ahouangassi (Benin) O A Fano-Dosh	15	14

Quarter-finals
1	(Algeria) K Mammeri (Algeria) Y S Medel	21	21
(Uganda) F Attama (Uganda) P Makande	10	8

==== Section 2 ====
First round
4	(Egypt) A Abdelhakim (Egypt) M M Kamel
Bye
(Mauritius) M Appiah (Mauritius) K R Nundah	13	13
(Réunion) A Aaron (Réunion) Chan F T X	21	21
(Seychelles) Jie L (Seychelles) J Renaud
Bye
(Uganda) A Muyanja (Uganda) K C Mwambu	w	/	o
(Ghana) A Abdul-Samad (Ghana) K Alphous

Second round
4	(Egypt) A Abdelhakim (Egypt) M M Kamel	21	17	23
(Réunion) A Aaron (Réunion) Chan F T X	18	21	21
(Seychelles) Jie L (Seychelles) J Renaud	21	18	21
(Uganda) A Muyanja (Uganda) K C Mwambu	17	21	19

Quarter-finals
4	(Egypt) A Abdelhakim (Egypt) M M Kamel	21	21
(Seychelles) Jie L (Seychelles) J Renaud	15	12

=== Bottom half ===
==== Section 3 ====
First round
(Zimbabwe) P Mateme (Zimbabwe) T Muvavi	8	13
(Mauritius) J B Bongout (Mauritius) T Pultoo	21	21
Bye
(Ghana) R Quarcoo (Ghana) A Tamakloe
(South Africa) C Coetzer (South Africa) R White	21	21
(Réunion) G Grondin (Réunion) N Loic Antoine	12	12
Bye
3	(Algeria) M A Belarbi (Algeria) A Hamek

Second round
(Mauritius) J B Bongout (Mauritius) T Pultoo	w	/	o
(Ghana) R Quarcoo (Ghana) A Tamakloe
(South Africa) C Coetzer (South Africa) R White	13	21	16
3	(Algeria) M A Belarbi (Algeria) A Hamek	21	16	21

Quarter-finals
(Mauritius) J B Bongout (Mauritius) T Pultoo	14	7
3	(Algeria) M A Belarbi (Algeria) A Hamek	21	21

==== Section 4 ====
First round
(Benin) P Adomahou (Benin) C M Codjo Kpanou	21	21
(Cameroon) M H Assembe (Cameroon) A E O Ndimako	15	12
Bye
(Botswana) K Godknows (Botswana) C Mosweu
Bye
(Uganda) B Kasirye (Uganda) I Wanagalya
Bye
2	(Egypt) A H Elgamal (Egypt) A Salah

Second round
(Benin) P Adomahou (Benin) C M Codjo Kpanou	12	13
(Botswana) K Godknows (Botswana) C Mosweu	21	21
(Uganda) B Kasirye (Uganda) I Wanagalya	17	23
2	(Egypt) A H Elgamal (Egypt) A Salah	21	25

Quarter-finals
(Botswana) K Godknows (Botswana) C Mosweu	12	14
2	(Egypt) A H Elgamal (Egypt) A Salah	21	21

== Women's doubles ==
=== Seeds ===
1. (Uganda) Fadilah Mohamed Rafi / Tracy Naluwooza (first round)
2. (Algeria) Mounib Celia / Tanina Violette Mammeri (quarter-finals)
3. (Cameroon) Madeleine Carene Leticia Akoumba Ze / Maeva Princia Gertrude Anamba (first round)
4. (Egypt) Nour Ahmed Youssri / Doha Hany (semi-finals)

=== Finals ===
Semi-finals
(Mauritius) Lorna Bodha (Mauritius) Kobita Dookhee	21	21
(Réunion) Audrey Lebon (Réunion) Leperlier Estelle	5	8
4	(Egypt) Nour Ahmed Youssri (Egypt) Doha Hany	10	19
(South Africa) Amy Ackerman (South Africa) Deidre Laurens Jordaan	21	21

Final
(Mauritius) Lorna Bodha (Mauritius) Kobita Dookhee	21	22
(South Africa) Amy Ackerman (South Africa) Deidre Laurens Jordaan	18	20

=== Top half ===
==== Section 1 ====
First Round
1	(Uganda) F Mohamed Rafi (Uganda) T Naluwooza	17	16
(Mauritius) L Bodha (Mauritius) K Dookhee	21	21
(South Africa) D Botha (South Africa) D Olivier	21	16	13
(Algeria) H Bouksani (Algeria) M Ouchefoun	19	21	21

Quarter-finals
(Mauritius) L Bodha (Mauritius) K Dookhee	18	21	21
(Algeria) H Bouksani (Algeria) M Ouchefoun	21	15	18

==== Section 2 ====
First Round
3	(Cameroon) M C L Akoumba Ze (Cameroon) M P G Anamba	15	11
(Réunion) A Lebon (Réunion) L Estelle	21	21
(Ghana) P Nantuo (Ghana) C Tornyenyor	w	/	d
(Egypt) J Ashraf (Egypt) H Tarek	w	/	d

Quarter-finals
(Réunion) A Lebon (Réunion) L Estelle	w	/	o

==== Section 3 ====
First Round
(Uganda) R S Mbira (Uganda) S Wanyana	21	21
(Zimbabwe) R Ruwende (Zimbabwe) A Sibiya	7	5
(Uganda) B Awor (Uganda) H Kobugabe	9	21	16
4	(Egypt) N A Youssri (Egypt) D Hany	21	19	21

Quarter-finals
(Uganda) R S Mbira (Uganda) S Wanyana	11	9
4	(Egypt) N A Youssri (Egypt) D Hany	21	21

==== Section 4 ====
First Round
(South Africa) A Ackerman (South Africa) D Laurens Jordaan	21	21
(Réunion) L-H Chai (Réunion) M Lepetit	13	17
(Mauritius) T Bhurtun (Mauritius) L L Chiniah	5	7
2	(Algeria) M Celia (Algeria) T V Mammeri	21	21

Quarter-finals
(South Africa) A Ackerman (South Africa) D Laurens Jordaan	18	21	21
2	(Algeria) M Celia (Algeria) T V Mammeri	21	6	12

== Mixed doubles ==
=== Seeds ===
1. (Egypt) Adham Hatem Elgamal / Doha Hany (quarter-finals)
2. (South Africa) Jarred Elliott / Amy Ackerman (final)
3. (Mauritius) Tejraj Pultoo / Kobita Dookhee (quarter-finals)
4. (South Africa) Robert White / Deidre Laurens Jordaan (second round)

=== Finals ===
Semi-finals
(Algeria) Koceila Mammeri (Algeria) Tanina Mammeri	21	21
(Réunion) Chan Fung Ting Xavier (Réunion) Ly-Hoa Chai	10	7
(Mauritius) Jean Bernard Bongout (Mauritius) Lorna Bodha	21	16	9
2	(South Africa) Jarred Elliott (South Africa) Amy Ackerman	18	21	21

Final
(Algeria) Koceila Mammeri (Algeria) Tanina Mammeri	21	21
2	(South Africa) Jarred Elliott (South Africa) Amy Ackerman	13	14

=== Top half ===
==== Section 1 ====
First round
1	(Egypt) A H Elgamal (Egypt) D Hany
Bye
(Uganda) I Wanagalya (Uganda) H Kobugabe
Bye
(Algeria) K Mammeri (Algeria) T Mammeri
Bye
(Mauritius) M Appiah (Mauritius) V Appiah	21	21
(Cameroon) M H Assembe (Cameroon) M P G Anamba	9	13

Second round
1	(Egypt) A H Elgamal (Egypt) D Hany	21	24
(Uganda) I Wanagalya (Uganda) H Kobugabe	10	22
(Algeria) K Mammeri (Algeria) T Mammeri	21	21
(Mauritius) M Appiah (Mauritius) V Appiah	14	11

Quarter-finals
1	(Egypt) A H Elgamal (Egypt) D Hany	13	18
(Algeria) K Mammeri (Algeria) T Mammeri	21	21

==== Section 2 ====
First round
4	(South Africa) R White (South Africa) D Laurens Jordaan
Bye
(Egypt) M M Kamel (Egypt) H Tarek	9	21	7
(Réunion) Chan F T X (Réunion) L-H Chai	21	19	21
(Seychelles) Jie L (Seychelles) A Camille
Bye
(Ghana) A Abdul-Samad (Ghana) C Tornyenyor
(Uganda) K C Mwambu (Uganda) T Naluwooza	w	/	o

Second round
4	(South Africa) R White (South Africa) D Laurens Jordaan	14	18
(Réunion) Chan F T X (Réunion) L-H Chai	21	21
(Seychelles) Jie L (Seychelles) A Camille	21	21
(Uganda) K C Mwambu (Uganda) T Naluwooza	13	16

Quarter-finals
(Réunion) Chan F T X (Réunion) L-H Chai	21	21
(Seychelles) Jie L (Seychelles) A Camille	18	15

=== Bottom half ===
==== Section 3 ====
First round
(Mauritius) J B Bongout (Mauritius) L Bodha	21	21
(Uganda) F Attama (Uganda) B Awor	14	14
Bye
(Algeria) M A Belarbi (Algeria) M Celia
(Ghana) K Alphous (Ghana) P Nantuo
(South Africa) C Coetzer (South Africa) D Botha	w	/	o
Bye
3	(Mauritius) T Pultoo (Mauritius) K Dookhee

Second round
(Mauritius) J B Bongout (Mauritius) L Bodha	21	20	23
(Algeria) M A Belarbi (Algeria) M Celia	15	22	21
(South Africa) C Coetzer (South Africa) D Botha	12	23
3	(Mauritius) T Pultoo (Mauritius) K Dookhee	21	25

Quarter-finals
(Mauritius) J B Bongout (Mauritius) L Bodha	21	21
3	(Mauritius) T Pultoo (Mauritius) K Dookhee	19	19

==== Section 4 ====
First round
(Réunion) N Loic Antoine (Réunion) M Lepetit	9	13
(Egypt) A Salah (Egypt) N A Youssri	21	21
Bye
(Uganda) B Kasirye (Uganda) F Mohamed Rafi
(Réunion) A Aaron (Réunion) A Lebon	21	21
(Algeria) S Larbaoui (Algeria) L Mazri	17	19
Bye
2	(South Africa) J Elliott (South Africa) A Ackerman

Second round
(Egypt) A Salah (Egypt) N A Youssri	18	21	18
(Uganda) B Kasirye (Uganda) F Mohamed Rafi	21	15	21
(Réunion) A Aaron (Réunion) A Lebon	19	16
2	(South Africa) J Elliott (South Africa) A Ackerman	21	21

Quarter-finals
(Uganda) B Kasirye (Uganda) F Mohamed Rafi	21	19	10
2	(South Africa) J Elliott (South Africa) A Ackerman	17	21	21
