= 2025 African Badminton Championships =

Tournament details
- Dates: 10–13 February (mixed team event); 14–16 February (individual event)
- Edition: 29th
- Competitors: 10
- Venue: Gymnase de Japoma
- Location: Douala, Cameroon

The 2025 African Badminton Championships was the continental badminton championships to crown the best players and teams across Africa. The tournament was held at the Gymnase de Japoma in Douala, Cameroon, from 10 to 16 February 2025.

== Tournament ==
The 2025 African Badminton Championships was the 29th edition of the African Badminton Championships. It was sanctioned by the Badminton Africa, and the Badminton World Federation.

=== Venue ===
The tournament was held at the Gymnase de Japoma in Douala, Cameroon.

=== Point distribution ===
The individual event of this tournament was graded based on the BWF points system for the BWF International Challenge event. Below is the table with the point distribution for each phase of the tournament.

Winner	Runner-up	3/4	5/8	9/16	17/32	33/64	65/128
4,000	3,400	2,800	2,200	1,520	920	360	170

== Medalists ==
Event	Gold	Silver	Bronze
Teams	Algeria; Mohamed Abderrahime Belarbi; Adel Hamek; Sifeddine Larbaoui; Koceila Mammeri; Youcef Sabri Medel; Mohamed Abdelaziz Ouchefoun; Halla Bouksani; Yasmina Chibah; Sirine Ibrahim; Tanina Mammeri; Linda Mazri; Malak Ouchefoun	Mauritius; Jean Bernard Bongout; Lucas Douce; Julien Paul; Lorna Bodha; Kate Ludik; Chiara How Hong; Elsa How Hong	Egypt; Abdelrahman Abdelsattar; Ahmed Ali Bahnsawy; Adham Hatem Elgamal; Kareem Ezzat; Montaser Mahmoud; Seif Omar; Nour Ahmed Youssri; Hadia Elgendy; Alya Elghandour; Doha Hany; Fatema Rabie; Hana Tarek Zaher
Teams	Algeria; Mohamed Abderrahime Belarbi; Adel Hamek; Sifeddine Larbaoui; Koceila Mammeri; Youcef Sabri Medel; Mohamed Abdelaziz Ouchefoun; Halla Bouksani; Yasmina Chibah; Sirine Ibrahim; Tanina Mammeri; Linda Mazri; Malak Ouchefoun	Mauritius; Jean Bernard Bongout; Lucas Douce; Julien Paul; Lorna Bodha; Kate Ludik; Chiara How Hong; Elsa How Hong	South Africa; Caden Kakora; Daniel Steyn; Robert Summers; Miguel Vigario; Amy Ackerman; Elme de Villiers; Michaela Ohlson; Johanita Scholtz
Men's singles	(Nigeria) Anuoluwapo Juwon Opeyori	(Egypt) Adham Hatem Elgamal	(Mauritius) Julien Paul
Men's singles	(Nigeria) Anuoluwapo Juwon Opeyori	(Egypt) Adham Hatem Elgamal	(Morocco) Driss Bourroum
Women's singles	(Egypt) Nour Ahmed Youssri	(Egypt) Doha Hany	(Uganda) Fadilah Mohamed Rafi
Women's singles	(Egypt) Nour Ahmed Youssri	(Egypt) Doha Hany	(Uganda) Husina Kobugabe
Men's doubles	(Algeria) Koceila Mammeri (Algeria) Youcef Sabri Medel	(Mauritius) Jean Bernard Bongout (Mauritius) Julien Paul	(Nigeria) Joseph Emmanuel Emmy (Nigeria) Victor Ikechukwu
Men's doubles	(Algeria) Koceila Mammeri (Algeria) Youcef Sabri Medel	(Mauritius) Jean Bernard Bongout (Mauritius) Julien Paul	(Algeria) Mohamed Abderrahime Belarbi (Algeria) Adel Hamek
Women's doubles	(South Africa) Amy Ackerman (South Africa) Johanita Scholtz	(Algeria) Yasmina Chibah (Algeria) Linda Mazri	(Uganda) Fadilah Mohamed Rafi (Uganda) Tracy Naluwooza
Women's doubles	(South Africa) Amy Ackerman (South Africa) Johanita Scholtz	(Algeria) Yasmina Chibah (Algeria) Linda Mazri	(Mauritius) Chiara How Hong (Mauritius) Elsa How Hong
Mixed doubles	(Algeria) Koceila Mammeri (Algeria) Tanina Mammeri	(Egypt) Adham Hatem Elgamal (Egypt) Doha Hany	(South Africa) Caden Kakora (South Africa) Johanita Scholtz
Mixed doubles	(Algeria) Koceila Mammeri (Algeria) Tanina Mammeri	(Egypt) Adham Hatem Elgamal (Egypt) Doha Hany	(Nigeria) Alhaji Aliyu Shehu (Nigeria) Uchechukwu Deborah Ukeh

=== Medal table ===
* Host nation (Cameroon)

Rank	Nation	Gold	Silver	Bronze	Total
1	Algeria	3	1	1	5
2	Egypt	1	3	1	5
3	Nigeria	1	0	2	3
3	South Africa	1	0	2	3
5	Mauritius	0	2	2	4
6	Uganda	0	0	3	3
7	Morocco	0	0	1	1
Totals (7 entries)		6	6	12	24

== Men's singles ==
=== Seeds ===
1. (Mauritius) Julien Paul (semi-finals)
2. (Nigeria) Anuoluwapo Juwon Opeyori (champion)
3. (Egypt) Adham Hatem Elgamal (final)
4. (Zambia) Kalombo Mulenga (third round)
5. (Algeria) Adel Hamek (quarter-finals)
6. Driss Bourroum (semi-finals)
7. (Nigeria) Victor Ikechukwu (quarter-finals)
8. (South Africa) Caden Kakora (third round)

=== Finals ===
Quarter-finals
1	(Mauritius) J Paul	21	21
5	(Algeria) A Hamek	19	16
3	(Egypt) A H Elgamal	13	21	21
7	(Nigeria) V Ikechukwu	21	12	17
6	D Bourroum	21	22
(Nigeria) J Emmanuel Emmy	14	20
(Mauritius) J B Bongout	23	13	17
2	(Nigeria) A J Opeyori	21	21	21

Semi-finals
1	(Mauritius) Julien Paul	20	19
3	(Egypt) Adham Hatem Elgamal	22	21
6	Driss Bourroum	18	17
2	(Nigeria) Anuoluwapo Juwon Opeyori	21	21

Final
3	(Egypt) Adham Hatem Elgamal	7	21
2	(Nigeria) Anuoluwapo Juwon Opeyori	21	23

=== Top half ===
==== Section 1 ====
First round
(Madagascar) L Ramanana Rahary	w	/	o
(Ghana) A Abdul-Samad

Second round
1	(Mauritius) J Paul	21	21
(Eritrea) H Michael	6	6
(Réunion) X Chan	13	21	12
(Madagascar) L Ramanana Rahary	21	14	21

Third round
1	(Mauritius) J Paul	21	21
(Madagascar) L Ramanana Rahary	11	18

==== Section 2 ====
First round
(South Africa) M Vigario	11	22	12
(Uganda) A Muyanja	21	20	21
(Egypt) A Abdelsattar	10	21	17
(Zambia) C Mulenga	21	16	21

Second round
5	(Algeria) A Hamek	21	19	21
(Uganda) A Muyanja	17	21	10
(Equatorial Guinea) O Solomon	21	21
(Zambia) C Mulenga	10	12

Third round
5	(Algeria) A Hamek	22	20	21
(Equatorial Guinea) O Solomon	20	22	13

==== Section 3 ====
First round
(Equatorial Guinea) R Mouyalbe	5	3
(Réunion) L Nanicaoudin	21	21

Second round
3	(Egypt) A H Elgamal	21	21
(Cameroon) F D Nkonomo Bengono	9	11
(Uganda) K Mwambu	21	21
(Réunion) L Nanicaoudin	8	14

Third round
3	(Egypt) A H Elgamal	21	21
(Uganda) K Mwambu	4	7

==== Section 4 ====
First round
(Réunion) A Assing	w	/	o
(Ghana) B Ofori-Acheampong
(Uganda) M Lubega	21	21
(Cameroon) F Kemene Atangana	15	9

Second round
7	(Nigeria) V Ikechukwu	21	21
(Réunion) A Assing	14	15
(South Africa) R Summers	21	21
(Uganda) M Lubega	18	8

Third round
7	(Nigeria) V Ikechukwu	20	21	21
(South Africa) R Summers	22	10	17

=== Bottom half ===
==== Section 5 ====
First round
(Algeria) S Larbaoui	12	1
(Egypt) K Ezzat	21	21
(Mauritius) L Douce	21	21
(Cameroon) J M F Evina	4	10

Second round
(Egypt) K Ezzat	21	14	16
6	(Egypt) S Omar	13	21	21
(Mauritius) L Douce	21	14	16
6	D Bourroum	17	21	21

Third round
(Egypt) S Omar	17	16
6	D Bourroum	21	21

==== Section 6 ====
First round
(Nigeria) J Emmanuel Emmy	21	21
(South Africa) D Steyn	11	5

Second round
(Nigeria) J Emmanuel Emmy	21	21
(Cameroon) P Nolem	3	5
(Eritrea) A Kiros	5	9
4	(Zambia) K Mulenga	21	21

Third round
(Nigeria) J Emmanuel Emmy	21	21
4	(Zambia) K Mulenga	11	12

==== Section 7 ====
First round
(Ghana) L N A Addo
(Algeria) M A Belarbi	w	/	o
(Egypt) A Ali Bahnsawy	21	14	13
(Uganda) A Owinyi	10	21	21

Second round
(Algeria) M A Belarbi	21	20	13
(Mauritius) J B Bongout	15	22	21
(Uganda) A Owinyi	8	10
8	(South Africa) C Kakora	21	21

Third round
(Mauritius) J B Bongout	21	13	21
8	(South Africa) C Kakora	17	21	15

==== Section 8 ====
First round
(Réunion) T Cougouille	21	21
(Cameroon) P C Assembe Voundi	9	7

Second round
(Réunion) T Cougouille	21	21
(Cameroon) M H Assembe	8	5
(Algeria) M A Ouchefoun	11	14
2	(Nigeria) A J Opeyori	21	21

Third round
(Réunion) T Cougouille	13	13
2	(Nigeria) A J Opeyori	21	21

== Women's singles ==
=== Seeds ===
1. (Uganda) Fadilah Mohamed Rafi (semi-finals)
2. (South Africa) Johanita Scholtz (quarter-finals)
3. (Uganda) Husina Kobugabe (semi-finals)
4. (Egypt) Doha Hany (final)
5. (Uganda) Tracy Naluwooza (second round)
6. (Uganda) Gladys Mbabazi (quarter-finals)
7. (Nigeria) Dorcas Ajoke Adesokan (quarter-finals)
8. (Nigeria) Sofiat Arinola Obanishola (withdrew)

=== Finals ===
Quarter-finals
1	(Uganda) F Mohamed Rafi	21	21
(Mauritius) E How Hong	6	19
4	(Egypt) D Hany	21	21
6	(Uganda) G Mbabazi	10	13
7	(Nigeria) D A Adesokan	21	16	11
3	(Uganda) H Kobugabe	18	21	21
(Egypt) N Ahmed Youssri	21	21
2	(South Africa) J Scholtz	11	12

Semi-finals
1	(Uganda) Fadilah Mohamed Rafi	10	20
4	(Egypt) Doha Hany	21	22
3	(Uganda) Husina Kobugabe	12	11
(Egypt) Nour Ahmed Youssri	21	21

Final
4	(Egypt) Doha Hany	7	14
(Egypt) Nour Ahmed Youssri	21	21

=== Top half ===
==== Section 1 ====
First round

Second round
1	(Uganda) F Mohamed Rafi	21	21
(Egypt) H Elgendy	18	14
(Cameroon) C Akumbom Ntangsi	18	17
(Réunion) A Bradel	21	21

Third Round
1	(Uganda) F Mohamed Rafi	21	21
(Réunion) A Bradel	3	10

==== Section 2 ====
First round
(Mauritius) E How Hong	21	21
(Cameroon) M P Ngo Hiol	9	7

Second round
8	(Nigeria) S A Obanishola
(Egypt) F Rabie	w	/	o
(Réunion) E Grondin	11	9
(Mauritius) E How Hong	21	21

Third round
(Egypt) F Rabie	9	19
(Mauritius) E How Hong	21	21

==== Section 3 ====
First round
(Cameroon) S Avidi Meka	12	9
(Algeria) L Mazri	21	21

Second round
4	(Egypt) D Hany	21	21
(Zambia) M Chilambe	6	5
(Cameroon) M Akoumba Ze	21	9	21
(Algeria) L Mazri	11	21	18

Third round
4	(Egypt) D Hany	21	21
(Cameroon) M Akoumba Ze	13	9

==== Section 4 ====
First round
(Nigeria) C Ibere	11	21	21
(Algeria) H Bouksani	21	14	15

Second round
6	(Uganda) G Mbabazi	21	21
(Equatorial Guinea) M N Edu Oye	4	4
(South Africa) M Ohlson	9	11
(Nigeria) C Ibere	21	21

Third round
6	(Uganda) G Mbabazi	21	14	21
(Nigeria) C Ibere	8	21	16

=== Bottom half ===
==== Section 5 ====
First round
(Algeria) S Ibrahim	21	21
(Réunion) E Admette	12	15

Second round
(Algeria) S Ibrahim	21	21
(Zambia) E Siamupangila	14	16
(Algeria) M Ouchefoun	19	21
7	(Nigeria) D A Adesokan	21	23

Third round
(Algeria) S Ibrahim	12	6
7	(Nigeria) D A Adesokan	21	21

==== Section 6 ====
First round
(Mauritius) C How Hong	17	19
(Algeria) Y Chibah	21	21

Second round
(Algeria) Y Chibah	w	/	o
(Ghana) R Quarcoo
(Egypt) A Elghandour	21	17	6
3	(Uganda) H Kobugabe	14	21	21

Third round
(Algeria) Y Chibah	15	10
3	(Uganda) H Kobugabe	21	21

==== Section 7 ====
First round
(Cameroon) K Diack Woti	6	5
(Egypt) N Ahmed Youssri	21	21

Second round
(Egypt) N Ahmed Youssri	21	21
(South Africa) E de Villiers	5	7
(Réunion) M Lepetit	21	18	21
5	(Uganda) T Naluwooza	17	21	14

Third round
(Egypt) N Ahmed Youssri	21	21
(Réunion) M Lepetit	3	6

==== Section 8 ====
First round
(Kenya) S Gupta	21	21
(Cameroon) M Anamba	13	15

Second round
(Kenya) S Gupta	21	21
(Zimbabwe) A Raina	17	8
(Equatorial Guinea) I A Ebee Mba	6	3
2	(South Africa) J Scholtz	21	21

Third round
(Kenya) S Gupta	11	19
2	(South Africa) J Scholtz	21	21

== Men's doubles ==
=== Seeds ===
1. (Algeria) Koceila Mammeri / Youcef Sabri Medel (champions)
2. (Zambia) Chongo Mulenga / Kalombo Mulenga (second round)
3. (Algeria) Mohamed Abderrahime Belarbi / Adel Hamek (semi-finals)
4. (Nigeria) Joseph Emmanuel Emmy / Victor Ikechukwu (semi-finals)

=== Finals ===
Semi-finals
1	(Algeria) Koceila Mammeri (Algeria) Youcef Sabri Medel	21	24	21
4	(Nigeria) Joseph Emmanuel Emmy (Nigeria) Victor Ikechukwu	13	26	11
3	(Algeria) Mohamed Abderrahime Belarbi (Algeria) Adel Hamek	21	13	10
(Mauritius) Jean Bernard Bongout (Mauritius) Julien Paul	15	21	21

Final
1	(Algeria) Koceila Mammeri (Algeria) Youcef Sabri Medel	21	21
(Mauritius) Jean Bernard Bongout (Mauritius) Julien Paul	19	9

=== Top half ===
==== Section 1 ====
First round

Second round
1	(Algeria) K Mammeri (Algeria) Y S Medel	21	21
(South Africa) D Steyn (South Africa) M Vigario	14	13
(Ghana) A Abdul-Samad (Ghana) L N A Addo
(Uganda) A Muyanja (Uganda) K Mwambu	w	/	o

Quarter-finals
1	(Algeria) K Mammeri (Algeria) Y S Medel	21	21
(Uganda) A Muyanja (Uganda) K Mwambu	6	5

==== Section 2 ====
First round
(Réunion) A Assing (Réunion) X Chan	21	14	9
(Egypt) A Ali Bahnsawy (Egypt) K Ezzat	14	21	21

Second round
4	(Nigeria) J E Emmy (Nigeria) V Ikechukwu	21	21
(Cameroon) P C Assembe Voundi (Cameroon) F D Nkonomo Bengono	16	8
(Cameroon) J M F Evina (Cameroon) P Nolem	8	9
(Egypt) A Ali Bahnsawy (Egypt) K Ezzat	21	21

Quarter-finals
4	(Nigeria) J E Emmy (Nigeria) V Ikechukwu	18	21	21
(Egypt) A Ali Bahnsawy (Egypt) K Ezzat	21	17	13

=== Bottom half ===
==== Section 3 ====
First round
(Eritrea) A Kiros (Eritrea) H Michael	11	9
(Egypt) A Abdelsattar (Egypt) Montaser M	21	21

Second round
(Egypt) A Abdelsattar (Egypt) Montaser M	21	16	22
(Réunion) T Cougouille (Réunion) L Nanicaoudin	9	21	20
(Nigeria) Nusa M (Nigeria) A A Shehu	18	17
3	(Algeria) M A Belarbi (Algeria) A Hamek	21	21

Quarter-finals
(Egypt) A Abdelsattar (Egypt) Montaser M	12	17
3	(Algeria) M A Belarbi (Algeria) A Hamek	21	21

==== Section 4 ====
First round
(Cameroon) M H Assembe (Cameroon) F Kemene Atangana	10	5
(South Africa) C Kakora (South Africa) R Summers	21	21

Second round
(South Africa) C Kakora (South Africa) R Summers	18	21	24
(Uganda) M Lubega (Uganda) A Owinyi	21	16	22
(Mauritius) J B Bongout (Mauritius) J Paul	21	20
2	(Zambia) C Mulenga (Zambia) K Mulenga	14	17^{r}

Quarter-finals
(South Africa) C Kakora (South Africa) R Summers	21	17	19
(Mauritius) J B Bongout (Mauritius) J Paul	19	21	21

== Women's doubles ==
=== Seeds ===
1. (Uganda) Fadilah Mohamed Rafi / Tracy Naluwooza (semi-finals)
2. (Uganda) Husina Kobugabe / Gladys Mbabazi (quarter-finals)

=== Bracket ===
First round
(Egypt) Nour Ahmed Youssri (Egypt) Fatema Rabie	23	21
(Réunion) Emanuelle Admette (Réunion) Emily Grondin	21	17
(South Africa) Amy Ackerman (South Africa) Johanita Scholtz	21	21
(Nigeria) Chineye Ibere (Nigeria) Uchechukwu Deborah Ukeh	12	8
(Algeria) Halla Bouksani (Algeria) Tanina Mammeri	21	21
(Cameroon) Madeleine Akoumba Ze (Cameroon) Maeva Anamba	10	10
(Réunion) Alison Bradel (Réunion) Mathilde Lepetit	12	12
(Mauritius) Chiara How Hong (Mauritius) Elsa How Hong	21	21
(South Africa) Elme de Villiers (South Africa) Michaela Ohlson	21	21
(Cameroon) Séraphine Avidi Meka (Cameroon) Mado Promesse Ngo Hiol	9	12
(Algeria) Yasmina Chibah (Algeria) Linda Mazri	w	/	o
(Nigeria) Dorcas Ajoke Adesokan (Nigeria) Sofiat Arinola Obanishola
(Egypt) Alya Elghandour (Egypt) Doha Hany	18	8
2	(Uganda) Husina Kobugabe (Uganda) Gladys Mbabazi	21	21

Quarter-finals
1	(Uganda) Fadilah Mohamed Rafi (Uganda) Tracy Naluwooza	21	21
(Egypt) Nour Ahmed Youssri (Egypt) Fatema Rabie	17	12
(South Africa) Amy Ackerman (South Africa) Johanita Scholtz	21	21
(Algeria) Halla Bouksani (Algeria) Tanina Mammeri	11	15
(Mauritius) Chiara How Hong (Mauritius) Elsa How Hong	18	21	23
(South Africa) Elme de Villiers (South Africa) Michaela Ohlson	21	13	21
(Algeria) Yasmina Chibah (Algeria) Linda Mazri	21	17	21
2	(Uganda) Husina Kobugabe (Uganda) Gladys Mbabazi	19	21	15

Semi-finals
1	(Uganda) Fadilah Mohamed Rafi (Uganda) Tracy Naluwooza	15	10
(South Africa) Amy Ackerman (South Africa) Johanita Scholtz	21	21
(Mauritius) Chiara How Hong (Mauritius) Elsa How Hong	6	14
(Algeria) Yasmina Chibah (Algeria) Linda Mazri	21	21

Final
(South Africa) Amy Ackerman (South Africa) Johanita Scholtz	24	21
(Algeria) Yasmina Chibah (Algeria) Linda Mazri	22	10

== Mixed doubles ==
=== Seeds ===
1. (Algeria) Koceila Mammeri / Tanina Mammeri (champions)
2. (Egypt) Adham Hatem Elgamal / Doha Hany (final)
3. (Nigeria) Alhaji Aliyu Shehy / Uchechukwu Deborah Ukeh (semi-finals)
4. (Uganda) Augustus Owinyi / Gladys Mbabazi (quarter-finals)

=== Finals ===
Semi-finals
1	(Algeria) Koceila Mammeri (Algeria) Tanina Mammeri	21	21
(South Africa) Caden Kakora (South Africa) Johanita Scholtz	9	11
3	(Nigeria) Alhaji Aliyu Shehu (Nigeria) Uchechukwu Deborah Ukeh	20	21	14
2	(Egypt) Adham Hatem Elgamal (Egypt) Doha Hany	22	9	21

Final
1	(Algeria) Koceila Mammeri (Algeria) Tanina Mammeri	w	/	o
2	(Egypt) Adham Hatem Elgamal (Egypt) Doha Hany

=== Top half ===
==== Section 1 ====
First round
(Mauritius) L Douce (Mauritius) E How Hong	21	21
(Réunion) X Chan (Réunion) A Bradel	5	12
(Uganda) K Mwambu (Uganda) T Naluwooza	13	16
(South Africa) R Summers (South Africa) A Ackerman	21	21

Second round
1	(Algeria) K Mammeri (Algeria) T Mammeri	21	21
(Mauritius) L Douce (Mauritius) E How Hong	13	12
(Egypt) A Ali Bahnsawy (Egypt) F Rabie	8	15
(South Africa) R Summers (South Africa) A Ackerman	21	21

Quarter-finals
1	(Algeria) K Mammeri (Algeria) T Mammeri	21	21
(South Africa) R Summers (South Africa) A Ackerman	5	12

==== Section 2 ====
First round
(Egypt) K Ezzat (Egypt) N Ahmed Youssri	16	15
(Réunion) T Cougouille (Réunion) E Admette	21	21
(Nigeria) Nusa M (Nigeria) Z D Alabi	15	15
(South Africa) C Kakora (South Africa) J Scholtz	21	21

Second round
4	(Uganda) A Owinyi (Uganda) G Mbabazi	21	24
(Réunion) T Cougouille (Réunion) E Admette	17	22
(Cameroon) F Kemene Atangana (Cameroon) M Akoumba Ze	9	11
(South Africa) C Kakora (South Africa) J Scholtz	21	21

Quarter-finals
4	(Uganda) A Owinyi (Uganda) G Mbabazi	13	7
(South Africa) C Kakora (South Africa) J Scholtz	21	21

=== Bottom half ===
==== Section 3 ====
First round
(South Africa) M Vigario (South Africa) E de Villiers	21	16	13
(Mauritius) J B Bongout (Mauritius) C How Hong	12	21	21
(Uganda) M Lubega (Uganda) H Kobugabe	21	21
(Réunion) L Nanicaoudin (Réunion) E Grondin	14	14

Second round
(Mauritius) J B Bongout (Mauritius) C How Hong	26	19
(Zambia) C Mulenga (Zambia) M Chilambe	28	21
(Uganda) M Lubega (Uganda) H Kobugabe	10	13
3	(Nigeria) A A Shehu (Nigeria) U D Ukeh	21	21

Quarter-finals
(Zambia) C Mulenga (Zambia) M Chilambe	13	10
3	(Nigeria) A A Shehu (Nigeria) U D Ukeh	21	21

==== Section 4 ====
First round
(Ghana) L N A Addo (Ghana) R Quarcoo
(Cameroon) M H Assembe (Cameroon) M Anamba	w	/	o
(Cameroon) J M F Evina (Cameroon) S Avidi Meka	10	7
(Algeria) Y S Medel (Algeria) S Ibrahim	21	21

Second round
(Cameroon) M H Assembe (Cameroon) M Anamba	14	11
(Algeria) M A Belarbi (Algeria) L Mazri	21	21
(Algeria) Y S Medel (Algeria) S Ibrahim	10	11
2	(Egypt) A H Elgamal (Egypt) D Hany	21	21

Quarter-finals
(Algeria) M A Belarbi (Algeria) L Mazri	14	11
2	(Egypt) A H Elgamal (Egypt) D Hany	21	21

== Team event ==
=== Group A ===
Pos	Team	Pld	W	L	MF	MA	MD	GF	GA	GD	PF	PA	PD	Pts	Qualification
1	Algeria	3	3	0	13	2	+11	26	6	+20	625	304	+321	3	Knockout stage
2	Egypt	3	2	1	12	3	+9	25	8	+17	640	363	+277	2	Knockout stage
3	Cameroon (H)	3	1	2	5	10	−5	18	20	−2	607	470	+137	1	
4	Ghana	3	0	3	0	15	−15	0	35	−35	0	735	−735	0	Withdrew

Source: BWF
(H) Host

==== Egypt vs Cameroon ====
Egypt
5
Gymnase de Japoma - Court 1
10 February 2025, 09:30 UTC+1
Report

Cameroon
0

			1	2	3
1	(Egypt) (Cameroon)	Abdelrahman Abdelsattar / Fatema Rabie; Michel Henri Assembe / Maeva Anamba	19; 21	21; 13	22; 20
2	(Egypt) (Cameroon)	Adham Hatem Elgamal; Félix Kemene Atangana	21; 8	21; 12
3	(Egypt) (Cameroon)	Nour Ahmed Youssri; Madeleine Akoumba Ze	13; 21	21; 11	21; 11
4	(Egypt) (Cameroon)	Ahmed Ali Bahnsawy / Kareem Ezzat; Michel Henri Assembe / Félix Kemene Atangana	21; 7	23; 21
5	(Egypt) (Cameroon)	Alya Elghandour / Doha Hany; Madeleine Akoumba Ze / Maeva Anamba	21; 11	21; 17

==== Algeria vs Ghana ====
Algeria
5
Gymnase de Japoma - Court 2
10 February 2025, 15:00 UTC+1
Report

Ghana
0

			1	2	3
1	(Algeria) (Ghana)	Mohamed Abderrahime Belarbi / Linda Mazri; Leslie Addo / Jennifer Eduam				w/o
2	(Algeria) (Ghana)	Adel Hamek; Ahmad Abdul-Samad				w/o
3	(Algeria) (Ghana)	Yasmina Chibah; Rachel Quarcoo				w/o
4	(Algeria) (Ghana)	Koceila Mammeri / Youcef Sabri Medel; Ahmad Abdul-Samad / Leslie Addo				w/o
5	(Algeria) (Ghana)	Halla Bouksani / Sirine Ibrahim; Jennifer Eduam / Rachel Quarcoo				w/o

==== Algeria vs Cameroon ====
Algeria
5
Gymnase de Japoma - Court 1
11 February 2025, 09:00 UTC+1
Report

Cameroon
0

			1	2	3
1	(Algeria) (Cameroon)	Halla Bouksani; Madeleine Akoumba Ze	21; 15	9; 21	21; 15
2	(Algeria) (Cameroon)	Adel Hamek; Félix Kemene Atangana	21; 6	21; 13
3	(Algeria) (Cameroon)	Yasmina Chibah / Linda Mazri; Madeleine Akoumba Ze / Maeva Anamba	21; 9	21; 8
4	(Algeria) (Cameroon)	Mohamed Abderrahime Belarbi / Youcef Sabri Medel; Michel Henri Assembe / Paul Assembe Voundi	21; 9	21; 10
5	(Algeria) (Cameroon)	Koceila Mammeri / Linda Mazri; Félix Kemene Atangana / Maeva Anamba	21; 11	21; 8

==== Egypt vs Ghana ====
Egypt
5
Gymnase de Japoma - Court 3
11 February 2025, 09:00 UTC+1
Report

Ghana
0

			1	2	3
1	(Egypt) (Ghana)	Seif Omar				w/o
2	(Egypt) (Ghana)	Doha Hany				w/o
3	(Egypt) (Ghana)	Abdelrahman Abdelsattar / Montaser Mahmoud /				w/o
4	(Egypt) (Ghana)	Nour Ahmed Youssri / Elgendy Hadia /				w/o
5	(Egypt) (Ghana)	Adham Hatem Elgamal / Alya Elghandour /				w/o

==== Cameroon vs Ghana ====
Cameroon
5
Gymnase de Japoma - Court 3
11 February 2025, 15:00 UTC+1
Report

Ghana
0

			1	2	3
1	(Cameroon) (Ghana)	Jean Marie Faride Evina Evina				w/o
2	(Cameroon) (Ghana)	Mado Promesse Ngo Hiol				w/o
3	(Cameroon) (Ghana)	Felix Dureil Nkonomo Bengono / Pascal Nolem /				w/o
4	(Cameroon) (Ghana)	Christaline Looh Akumbom Ntangsi / Khan Diack Woti /				w/o
5	(Cameroon) (Ghana)	Felix Dureil Nkonomo Bengono / Séraphine Merveille Avidi Meka /				w/o

==== Algeria vs Egypt ====
Algeria
3
Gymnase de Japoma - Court 4
11 February 2025, 15:00 UTC+1
Report

Egypt
2

			1	2	3
1	(Algeria) (Egypt)	Adel Hamek; Adham Hatem Elgamal	19; 21	9; 21
2	(Algeria) (Egypt)	Halla Bouksani; Nour Ahmed Youssri	8; 21	11; 21
3	(Algeria) (Egypt)	Koceila Mammeri / Youcef Sabri Medel; Ahmed Ali Bahnsawy / Kareem Ezzat	14; 21	21; 11	21; 11
4	(Algeria) (Egypt)	Yasmina Chibah / Linda Mazri; Nour Ahmed Youssri / Doha Hany	24; 22	21; 12
5	(Algeria) (Egypt)	Koceila Mammeri / Linda Mazri; Adham Hatem Elgamal / Doha Hany	21; 12	21; 12

=== Group B ===
Pos	Team	Pld	W	L	MF	MA	MD	GF	GA	GD	PF	PA	PD	Pts	Qualification
1	South Africa	2	2	0	9	1	+8	19	5	+14	485	351	+134	2	Knockout stage
2	Uganda	2	1	1	5	5	0	11	13	−2	423	420	+3	1	Knockout stage
3	Réunion	2	0	2	1	9	−8	6	18	−12	342	479	−137	0	

Source: BWF

==== South Africa vs Réunion ====
South Africa
5
Gymnase de Japoma - Court 2
10 February 2025, 09:30 UTC+1
Report

Réunion
0

			1	2	3
1	(South Africa) (Réunion)	Caden Kakora; Aaron Assing	18; 21	21; 15	21; 8
2	(South Africa) (Réunion)	Johanita Scholtz; Mathilde Lepetit	21; 10	21; 13
3	(South Africa) (Réunion)	Caden Kakora / Robert Summers; Aaron Assing / Xavier Chan	17; 21	21; 15	24; 22
4	(South Africa) (Réunion)	Amy Ackerman / Johanita Scholtz; Emmanuelle Admette / Alison Bradel	21; 10	21; 10
5	(South Africa) (Réunion)	Robert Summers / Amy Ackerman; Thibaud Cougouille / Emmanuelle Admette	21; 5	21; 9

==== Uganda vs Réunion ====
Uganda
4
Gymnase de Japoma - Court 3
10 February 2025, 15:00 UTC+1
Report

Réunion
1

			1	2	3
1	(Uganda) (Réunion)	Muzafaru Lubega / Husina Kobugabe; Thibaud Cougouille / Emmanuelle Admette	21; 12	19; 21	21; 8
2	(Uganda) (Réunion)	Kenneth Mwambu; Loïc Nanicaoudin	21; 18	21; 16
3	(Uganda) (Réunion)	Fadilah Mohamed Rafi; Mathilde Lepetit	21; 10	21; 7
4	(Uganda) (Réunion)	Muzafaru Lubega / Augustus Owinyi; Aaron Assing / Xavier Chan	9; 21	17; 21
5	(Uganda) (Réunion)	Husina Kobugabe / Gladys Mbabazi; Emmanuelle Admette / Mathilde Lepetit	17; 21	22; 20	21; 8

==== South Africa vs Uganda ====
South Africa
4
Gymnase de Japoma - Court 1
11 February 2025, 12:00 UTC+1
Report

Uganda
1

			1	2	3
1	(South Africa) (Uganda)	Robert Summers / Amy Ackerman; Muzafaru Lubega / Husina Kobugabe	21; 10	21; 9
2	(South Africa) (Uganda)	Caden Kakora; Kenneth Mwambu	21; 8	21; 17
3	(South Africa) (Uganda)	Johanita Scholtz; Fadilah Mohamed Rafi	21; 18	21; 18
4	(South Africa) (Uganda)	Daniel Steyn / Robert Summers; Muzafaru Lubega / Augustus Owinyi	21; 19	17; 21	16; 21
5	(South Africa) (Uganda)	Amy Ackerman / Johanita Scholtz; Husina Kobugabe / Gladys Mbabazi	15; 21	21; 19	21; 15

=== Group C ===
Pos	Team	Pld	W	L	MF	MA	MD	GF	GA	GD	PF	PA	PD	Pts	Qualification
1	Nigeria	3	3	0	13	2	+11	27	8	+19	689	441	+248	3	Knockout stage
2	Mauritius	3	2	1	11	4	+7	24	9	+15	635	452	+183	2	Knockout stage
3	Zambia	3	1	2	6	9	−3	14	19	−5	509	561	−52	1	
4	Equatorial Guinea	3	0	3	0	15	−15	1	30	−29	268	647	−379	0	

Source: BWF

==== Mauritius vs Equatorial Guinea ====
Mauritius
5
Gymnase de Japoma - Court 4
10 February 2025, 09:30 UTC+1
Report

Equatorial Guinea
0

			1	2	3
1	(Mauritius) (Equatorial Guinea)	Chiara How Hong; Isamar Ayang Ebee Mba	21; 2	21; 7
2	(Mauritius) (Equatorial Guinea)	Lucas Douce; Solomon Obiegue	21; 10	21; 15
3	(Mauritius) (Equatorial Guinea)	Chiara How Hong / Elsa How Hong; Isamar Ayang Ebee Mba / Melania Nchama Edu Oye	21; 5	21; 3
4	(Mauritius) (Equatorial Guinea)	Jean Bernard Bongout / Julien Paul; Carlos Santiago Nnandong / José Luis Nsogo	21; 6	21; 6
5	(Mauritius) (Equatorial Guinea)	Lucas Douce / Elsa How Hong; Solomon Obiegue / Melania Nchama Edu Oye	21; 11	21; 11

==== Nigeria vs Zambia ====
Nigeria
5
Gymnase de Japoma - Court 1
10 February 2025, 15:00 UTC+1
Report

Zambia
0

			1	2	3
1	(Nigeria) (Zambia)	Alhaji Aliyu Shehu / Uchechukwu Deborah Ukeh; Chongo Mulenga / Evelyn Siamupangila	21; 10	21; 15
2	(Nigeria) (Zambia)	Anuoluwapo Juwon Opeyori; Kalombo Mulenga	13; 21	21; 10	21; 12
3	(Nigeria) (Zambia)	Sofiat Arinola Obanishola; Mary Chilambe	21; 9	21; 4
4	(Nigeria) (Zambia)	Joseph Emmanuel Emmy / Victor Ikechukwu; Chongo Mulenga / Kalombo Mulenga	21; 14	19; 21	21; 17
5	(Nigeria) (Zambia)	Dorcas Ajoke Adesokan / Sofiat Arinola Obanishola; Mary Chilambe / Evelyn Siamupangila	21; 1	21; 9

==== Mauritius vs Zambia ====
Mauritius
4
Gymnase de Japoma - Court 2
11 February 2025, 09:00 UTC+1
Report

Zambia
1

			1	2	3
1	(Mauritius) (Zambia)	Lucas Douce / Elsa How Hong; Chongo Mulenga / Evelyn Siamupangila	21; 15	21; 17
2	(Mauritius) (Zambia)	Julien Paul; Kalombo Mulenga	11; 21	15; 21
3	(Mauritius) (Zambia)	Chiara How Hong; Mary Chilambe	21; 5	21; 7
4	(Mauritius) (Zambia)	Jean Bernard Bongout / Julien Paul; Chongo Mulenga / Kalombo Mulenga	22; 20	21; 14
5	(Mauritius) (Zambia)	Chiara How Hong / Elsa How Hong; Mary Chilambe / Evelyn Siamupangila	21; 10	21; 10

==== Nigeria vs Equatorial Guinea ====
Nigeria
5
Gymnase de Japoma - Court 4
11 February 2025, 09:00 UTC+1
Report

Equatorial Guinea
0

			1	2	3
1	(Nigeria) (Equatorial Guinea)	Victor Ikechukwu; Solomon Obiegue	21; 14	22; 20
2	(Nigeria) (Equatorial Guinea)	Chineye Ibere; Melania Nchama Edu Oye	21; 2	21; 4
3	(Nigeria) (Equatorial Guinea)	Nusah Momoh / Alhaji Aliyu Shehu; Carlos Santiago Nnandong / José Luis Nsogo	21; 6	21; 4
4	(Nigeria) (Equatorial Guinea)	Chineye Ibere / Uchechukwu Deborah Ukeh; Isamar Ayang Ebee Mba / Melania Nchama Edu Oye	21; 2	21; 4
5	(Nigeria) (Equatorial Guinea)	Nusah Momoh / Zainab Damilola Alabi; Solomon Obiegue / Isamar Ayang Ebee Mba	21; 8	21; 4

==== Zambia vs Equatorial Guinea ====
Zambia
5
Gymnase de Japoma - Court 1
11 February 2025, 15:00 UTC+1
Report

Equatorial Guinea
0

			1	2	3
1	(Zambia) (Equatorial Guinea)	Kalombo Mulenga; Solomon Obiegue	21; 14	21; 13
2	(Zambia) (Equatorial Guinea)	Mary Chilambe; Isamar Ayang Ebee Mba	21; 5	21; 14
3	(Zambia) (Equatorial Guinea)	Chongo Mulenga / Kalombo Mulenga; Carlos Santiago Nnandong / José Luis Nsogo	21; 3	21; 4
4	(Zambia) (Equatorial Guinea)	Mary Chilambe / Evelyn Siamupangila; Isamar Ayang Ebee Mba / Melania Nchama Edu Oye	21; 6	21; 9
5	(Zambia) (Equatorial Guinea)	Chongo Mulenga / Evelyn Siamupangila; Solomon Obiegue / Melania Nchama Edu Oye	21; 17	16; 21	21; 18

==== Mauritius vs Nigeria ====
Mauritius
2
Gymnase de Japoma - Court 2
11 February 2025, 15:00 UTC+1
Report

Nigeria
3

			1	2	3
1	(Mauritius) (Nigeria)	Lucas Douce / Elsa How Hong; Alhaji Aliyu Shehu / Uchechukwu Deborah Ukeh	21; 14	21; 17
2	(Mauritius) (Nigeria)	Jean Bernard Bongout; Anuoluwapo Juwon Opeyori	21; 15	15; 21	13; 21
3	(Mauritius) (Nigeria)	Chiara How Hong; Sofiat Arinola Obanishola	16; 21	17; 21
4	(Mauritius) (Nigeria)	Jean Bernard Bongout / Julien Paul; Joseph Emmanuel Emmy / Victor Ikechukwu	13; 21	21; 15	21; 11
5	(Mauritius) (Nigeria)	Chiara How Hong / Elsa How Hong; Dorcas Ajoke Adesokan / Sofiat Arinola Obanishola	17; 21	21; 17	13; 21

=== Knockout stage ===
Quarter-finals
Algeria
Bye
Egypt	3
Uganda	0
Mauritius	3
Nigeria	0
Bye
South Africa

Semi-finals
Algeria	3
Egypt	2
Mauritius	3
South Africa	1

Final
Algeria	3
Mauritius	1

==== Quarter-finals ====
Mauritius
3
Gymnase de Japoma - Court 1
12 February 2025, 09:00 UTC+1
Report

Nigeria
0

			1	2	3
1	(Mauritius) (Nigeria)	Lucas Douce; Anuoluwapo Juwon Opeyori	21; 12	19; 21	21; 15
2	(Mauritius) (Nigeria)	Elsa How Hong; Sofiat Arinola Obanishola	16; 21	1; 1		retired
3	(Mauritius) (Nigeria)	Jean Bernard Bongout / Julien Paul; Joseph Emmanuel Emmy / Victor Ikechukwu	21; 16	21; 13
4	(Mauritius) (Nigeria)	Chiara How Hong / Elsa How Hong; Dorcas Ajoke Adesokan / Sofiat Arinola Obanishola				not played
5	(Mauritius) (Nigeria)	Julien Paul / Chiara How Hong; Anuoluwapo Juwon Opeyori / Dorcas Ajoke Adesokan				not played

Egypt
3
Gymnase de Japoma - Court 2
12 February 2025, 09:00 UTC+1
Report

Uganda
0

			1	2	3
1	(Egypt) (Uganda)	Adham Hatem Elgamal / Doha Hany; Muzafaru Lubega / Husina Kobugabe	21; 10	21; 14
2	(Egypt) (Uganda)	Kareem Ezzat; Kenneth Mwambu	21; 17	21; 8
3	(Egypt) (Uganda)	Nour Ahmed Youssri; Fadilah Mohamed Rafi	21; 19	21; 7
4	(Egypt) (Uganda)	Ahmed Ali Bahnsawy / Adham Hatem Elgamal; Muzafaru Lubega / Augustus Owinyi				not played
5	(Egypt) (Uganda)	Nour Ahmed Youssri / Doha Hany; Husina Kobugabe / Gladys Mbabazi				not played

==== Semi-finals ====
Algeria
3
Gymnase de Japoma - Court 1
12 February 2025, 15:00 UTC+1
Report

Egypt
2

			1	2	3
1	(Algeria) (Egypt)	Koceila Mammeri / Linda Mazri; Montaser Mahmoud / Hadia Elgendy	21; 8	21; 14
2	(Algeria) (Egypt)	Mohamed Abderrahime Belarbi; Adham Hatem Elgamal	10; 21	14; 21
3	(Algeria) (Egypt)	Malak Ouchefoun; Nour Ahmed Youssri	9; 21	14; 21
4	(Algeria) (Egypt)	Koceila Mammeri / Youcef Sabri Medel; Abdelrahman Abdelsattar / Seif Omar	21; 13	21; 12
5	(Algeria) (Egypt)	Yasmina Chibah / Linda Mazri; Nour Ahmed Youssri / Doha Hany	21; 14	21; 14

Mauritius
3
Gymnase de Japoma - Court 2
12 February 2025, 15:00 UTC+1
Report

South Africa
1

			1	2	3
1	(Mauritius) (South Africa)	Julien Paul / Elsa How Hong; Robert Summers / Amy Ackerman	21; 13	13; 21	21; 18
2	(Mauritius) (South Africa)	Jean Bernard Bongout; Caden Kakora	21; 18	21; 13
3	(Mauritius) (South Africa)	Chiara How Hong; Johanita Scholtz	11; 21	6; 21
4	(Mauritius) (South Africa)	Jean Bernard Bongout / Julien Paul; Caden Kakora / Robert Summers	9; 21	21; 17	21; 18
5	(Mauritius) (South Africa)	Chiara How Hong / Elsa How Hong; Amy Ackerman / Johanita Scholtz				not played

==== Final ====
Algeria
3
Gymnase de Japoma - Court
12 February 2025, 15:00 UTC+1
Report

Mauritius
1

			1	2	3
1	(Algeria) (Mauritius)	Koceila Mammeri / Linda Mazri; Lucas Douce / Chiara How Hong	21; 11	21; 15
2	(Algeria) (Mauritius)	Adel Hamek; Julien Paul	21; 18	15; 21	11; 21
3	(Algeria) (Mauritius)	Halla Bouksani; Elsa How Hong	21; 13	21; 17
4	(Algeria) (Mauritius)	Koceila Mammeri / Youcef Sabri Medel; Jean Bernard Bongout / Julien Paul	21; 14	17; 21	21; 11
5	(Algeria) (Mauritius)	Yasmina Chibah / Linda Mazri; Chiara How Hong / Elsa How Hong				not played

=== Final ranking ===
Pos	Team	Pld	W	L	Pts	MD	GD	PD	Final result
1st place, gold medalist(s)	Algeria	5	5	0	5	+14	+26	+363	Champions
2nd place, silver medalist(s)	Mauritius	6	4	2	4	+10	+15	+160	Runners-up
3rd place, bronze medalist(s)	Egypt	5	3	2	3	+11	+19	+314	Eliminated in semi-finals
3rd place, bronze medalist(s)	South Africa	3	2	1	2	+6	+12	+150	Eliminated in semi-finals
5	Nigeria	4	3	1	3	+8	+17	+227	Eliminated in quarter-finals
6	Uganda	3	1	2	1	−3	−8	−48	Eliminated in quarter-finals
7	Zambia	3	1	2	1	−3	−5	−52	Eliminated in group stage
8	Réunion	2	0	2	0	−8	−12	−137	Eliminated in group stage
9	Cameroon (H)	2	0	2	0	−10	−17	−178	Eliminated in group stage
10	Equatorial Guinea	3	0	3	0	−15	−29	−379	Eliminated in group stage
–	Ghana	–	–	–	–	–	–	–	Withdrew
