= Algeria International =

Badminton championships

The Algeria International in badminton is an international open held in Algeria.

== Previous winners ==
Year	Men's singles	Women's singles	Men's doubles	Women's doubles	Mixed doubles	Ref
2007	(Algeria) Nabil Lasmari	(Portugal) Ana Moura	No competition			
2008–2017	No competition					
2018	(Morocco) Bilal Elharab	(Algeria) Halla Bouksani	(Algeria) Mohamed Abderrahime Belarbi (Algeria) Adel Hamek	(Egypt) Doha Hany (Egypt) Hadia Hosny	(Algeria) Mohamed Amine Guelmaoui (Algeria) Malak Ouchefoune	
2019	(Spain) Pablo Abián	(France) Marie Batomene	(Algeria) Koceila Mammeri (Algeria) Youcef Sabri Medel	(Peru) Daniela Macías (Peru) Dánica Nishimura	(Belgium) Jona van Nieuwkerke (Belgium) Lise Jaques	
2020	Cancelled (Note: This tournament, originally to be played from 22 to 25 October, was later cancelled due to COVID-19 pandemic in Algeria.)					
2021	Cancelled (Note: This tournament, originally to be played from 20 to 23 October, was later cancelled due to COVID-19 pandemic in Algeria.)					
2022	No competition					
2023	(Azerbaijan) Ade Resky Dwicahyo	(France) Rosy Oktavia Pancasari	(Algeria) Koceila Mammeri (Algeria) Youcef Sabri Medel	(South Africa) Amy Ackerman (South Africa) Deidre Laurens	(Algeria) Koceila Mammeri (Algeria) Tanina Mammeri	
2024	(Croatia) Aria Dinata	(Italy) Yasmine Hamza	(Algeria) Koceila Mammeri (Algeria) Youcef Sabri Medel	(France) Tea Marguerite (France) Flavie Vallet	(Algeria) Koceila Mammeri (Algeria) Tanina Mammeri	
2025	(Italy) Fabio Caponio	(Croatia) Jelena Buchberger	(Algeria) Koceila Mammeri (Algeria) Youcef Sabri Medel	(Italy) Martina Corsini (Italy) Emma Piccinin	(Algeria) Koceila Mammeri (Algeria) Tanina Mammeri	

== Performances by nation ==
As of the 2025 edition

Top Nations
Pos	Nation	MS	WS	MD	WD	XD	Total
1	Algeria	1	1	5		4	11
2	France		2		1		3
2	Italy	1	1		1		3
4	Croatia	1	1				2
5	Azerbaijan	1					1
5	Belgium					1	1
5	Egypt				1		1
5	Morocco	1					1
5	Peru				1		1
5	Portugal		1				1
5	South Africa				1		1
5	Spain	1					1
Total		6	6	5	5	5	27
