= Amy Ackerman =

South African badminton player

Personal information
- Born: 16 March 2005 (age 21)

Sport
- Country: South Africa
- Sport: Badminton

Women's & mixed doubles
- Highest ranking: 55 (WD with Deidré Laurens, 27 August 2024); 82 (XD with Jarred Elliott, 25 July 2023)
- BWF profile
Medal record
Women's badminton
Representing South Africa
African Championships
Gold medal – first place	2021 Kampala	Women's doubles
Gold medal – first place	2023 Benoni	Women's doubles
Gold medal – first place	2024 Cairo	Women's doubles
Gold medal – first place	2025 Douala	Women's doubles
Gold medal – first place	2026 Gaborone	Women's doubles
Silver medal – second place	2022 Kampala	Women's doubles
Silver medal – second place	2022 Kampala	Mixed doubles
Silver medal – second place	2026 Gaborone	Mixed doubles
Bronze medal – third place	2020 Cairo	Women's doubles
Bronze medal – third place	2021 Kampala	Mixed doubles
Bronze medal – third place	2023 Benoni	Mixed doubles
Africa Mixed Team Championships
Bronze medal – third place	2021 Kampala	Mixed team
Bronze medal – third place	2023 Benoni	Mixed team
Bronze medal – third place	2025 Douala	Mixed team
Africa Women's Team Championships
Gold medal – first place	2024 Cairo	Women's team
Gold medal – first place	2026 Gaborone	Women's team
Bronze medal – third place	2022 Kampala	Women's team

Amy Ackerman (born 16 March 2005) is a South African badminton player. She is five times African Champions, winning the women's doubles title with Johanita Scholtz in 2021, 2025, and 2026; and also with Deidré Laurens in 2023 and 2024.

== Achievements ==
=== African Championships ===
Women's doubles
Year	Venue	Partner	Opponent	Score	Result
2020	Cairo Stadium, Cairo, Egypt	(South Africa) Michelle Butler-Emmett	(Nigeria) Dorcas Ajoke Adesokan (Nigeria) Uchechukwu Deborah Ukeh	21–19, 8–21, 11–21	Bronze
2021	MTN Arena, Kampala, Uganda	(South Africa) Johanita Scholtz	(Algeria) Mounib Celia (Algeria) Tanina Mammeri	23–21, 21–13	Gold
2022	Lugogo Arena, Kampala, Uganda	(South Africa) Deidré Laurens	(Mauritius) Lorna Bodha (Mauritius) Kobita Dookhe	18–21, 20–22	Silver
2023	John Barrable Hall, Benoni, South Africa	(South Africa) Deidré Laurens	(Algeria) Yasmina Chibah (Algeria) Linda Mazri	21–19, 21–12	Gold
2024	Cairo Stadium Indoor Halls Complex, Cairo, Egypt	(South Africa) Deidré Laurens	(Uganda) Husina Kobugabe (Uganda) Gladys Mbabazi	21–11, 21–15	Gold
2025	Gymnase de Japoma, Douala, Cameroon	(South Africa) Johanita Scholtz	(Algeria) Yasmina Chibah (Algeria) Linda Mazri	24–22, 21–10	Gold
2026	Royal Aria, Gaborone, Botswana	(South Africa) Johanita Scholtz	(Egypt) Nour Ahmed Youssri (Egypt) Doha Hany	21–18, 21–17	Gold

Mixed doubles
Year	Venue	Partner	Opponent	Score	Result
2021	MTN Arena, Kampala, Uganda	(South Africa) Jarred Elliott	(Algeria) Koceila Mammeri (Algeria) Tanina Mammeri	21–18, 10–21, 10–21	Bronze
2022	Lugogo Arena, Kampala, Uganda	(South Africa) Jarred Elliott	(Algeria) Koceila Mammeri (Algeria) Tanina Mammeri	13–21, 14–21	Silver
2023	John Barrable Hall, Benoni, South Africa	(South Africa) Jarred Elliott	(Algeria) Koceila Mammeri (Algeria) Tanina Mammeri	20–22, 18–21	Bronze
2026	Royal Aria, Gaborone, Botswana	(South Africa) Caden Kakora	(Algeria) Koceila Mammeri (Algeria) Tanina Mammeri	12–21, 9–21	Silver

=== BWF International Challenge/Series (14 titles, 9 runners-up) ===
Women's doubles
Year	Tournament	Partner	Opponent	Score	Result
2021	Benin International	(South Africa) Dinae Olivier	(South Africa) Demi Botha (South Africa) Deidré Laurens	16–21, 19–21	(silver) Runner-up
2021	Botswana International	(South Africa) Johanita Scholtz	(Kazakhstan) Kamila Smagulova (Kazakhstan) Aisha Zhumabek	21–9, 21–10	(gold) Winner
2021	South Africa International	(South Africa) Johanita Scholtz	(South Africa) Megan de Beer (South Africa) Deidré Laurens	21–17, 21–11	(gold) Winner
2022	Egypt International	(South Africa) Deidré Laurens	(Italy) Martina Corsini (Italy) Judith Mair	5–21, 13–21	(silver) Runner-up
2022	Zambia International	(South Africa) Deidré Laurens	(Azerbaijan) Keisha Fatimah Azzahra (Azerbaijan) Era Maftuha	12–21, 8–21	(silver) Runner-up
2022	Botswana International	(South Africa) Deidré Laurens	(Mauritius) Lorna Bodha (Mauritius) Kobita Dookhe	21–10, 21–11	(gold) Winner
2023	Algeria International	(South Africa) Deidré Laurens	(Algeria) Yasmina Chibah (Algeria) Linda Mazri	21–19, 21–12	(gold) Winner
2023	Zambia International	(South Africa) Deidré Laurens	(Uganda) Husina Kobugabe (Uganda) Gladys Mbabazi	21–13, 21–15	(gold) Winner
2023	Botswana International	(South Africa) Deidré Laurens	(Maldives) Aminath Nabeeha Abdul Razzaq (Maldives) Fathimath Nabaaha Abdul Razzaq	21–13, 20–22, 21–18	(gold) Winner
2023	South Africa International	(South Africa) Deidré Laurens	(South Africa) Megan de Beer (South Africa) Johanita Scholtz	21–14, 21–19	(gold) Winner
2024	Botswana International	(South Africa) Deidré Laurens	(Sri Lanka) Hasini Ambalangodage (Sri Lanka) Hasara Wijayarathne	18–21, 20–22	(silver) Runner-up
2024	South Africa International	(South Africa) Deidré Laurens	(Sri Lanka) Hasini Ambalangodage (Sri Lanka) Hasara Wijayarathne	21–14, 21–14	(gold) Winner
2025	Zambia International	(South Africa) Johanita Scholtz	(Maldives) Aminath Nabeeha Abdul Razzaq (Maldives) Fathimath Nabaaha Abdul Razzaq	21–16, 21–14	(gold) Winner
2025	Botswana International	(South Africa) Johanita Scholtz	(Maldives) Aminath Nabeeha Abdul Razzaq (Maldives) Fathimath Nabaaha Abdul Razzaq	19–21, 21–13, 21–15	(gold) Winner
2025	South Africa International	(South Africa) Johanita Scholtz	(Maldives) Aminath Nabeeha Abdul Razzaq (Maldives) Fathimath Nabaaha Abdul Razzaq	21–9, 24–26, 21–14	(gold) Winner
2026	Zambia International	(South Africa) Johanita Scholtz	(United Arab Emirates) Sreeyuktha Sreejith Parol (United Arab Emirates) Nayonika Rajesh	21–18, 21–14	(gold) Winner

Mixed doubles
Year	Tournament	Partner	Opponent	Score	Result
2021	Benin International	(South Africa) Cameron Coetzer	(South Africa) Jarred Elliott (South Africa) Deidré Laurens	17–21, 20–22	(silver) Runner-up
2021	South Africa International	(South Africa) Jarred Elliott	(South Africa) Robert White (South Africa) Deidré Laurens	Walkover	(silver) Runner-up
2022	Zambia International	(South Africa) Jarred Elliott	(Jordan) Bahaedeen Ahmad Alshannik (Jordan) Domou Amro	17–21, 21–11, 15–21	(silver) Runner-up
2022	Botswana International	(South Africa) Jarred Elliott	(Egypt) Adham Hatem Elgamal (Egypt) Doha Hany	21–12, 21–19	(gold) Winner
2025	Botswana International	(South Africa) Robert Summers	(South Africa) Caden Kakora (South Africa) Johanita Scholtz	21–10, 16–21, 21–13	(gold) Winner
2025	South Africa International	(South Africa) Robert Summers	(Saudi Arabia) Amer Mohammed (Saudi Arabia) Nabiha Shariff	16–21, 15–9 retired	(silver) Runner-up
2026	Zambia International	(South Africa) Caden Kakora	(Slovenia) Miha Ivančič (Slovenia) Anja Jordan	18–21, 21–17, 18–21	(silver) Runner-up

BWF International Challenge tournament
BWF International Series tournament
BWF Future Series tournament
