= 2015 BWF season =

Details
- Duration: 6 January – 20 December
- Edition: 76th
- Tournaments: 101

Achievements (singles)

Awards
- Player of the year: (China) Chen Long (Male) (Spain) Carolina Marín (Female)

The 2015 BWF Season was the overall badminton circuit organized by the Badminton World Federation (BWF) for the 2015 badminton season to publish and promote the sport. Besides the BWF World Championships, BWF promotes the sport of badminton through an extensive worldwide programme of events in four structure levels. They are the individual tournaments called Super Series, Grand Prix Events, International Challenge and International Series. Besides the individual tournaments, team events such as Thomas Cup & Uber Cup and Sudirman Cup are held every other year.

The 2015 BWF season calendar comprises the World Championships tournaments, the Sudirman Cup, the BWF Super Series (Super Series, Super Series Premier, Super Series Finals), the Grand Prix (Grand Prix Gold and Grand Prix), the International Series (International Series and International Challenge), and BWF Future Series.

== Schedule ==
This is the complete schedule of events on the 2015 calendar, with the Champions and Runners-up documented.

Key

World Championships
Super Series Finals
Super Series Premier
Super Series
Grand Prix Gold
Grand Prix
International Challenge
International Series
Future Series
Team events

=== January ===
Week of	Tournament	Champions	Runners-up
January 5	Thailand International; Bangkok, Thailand; International Challenge $15,000 – 64MS/64WS/64MD/32WD/64XD	(South Korea) Lee Hyun-il; 21–13, 21–10	(Thailand) Suppanyu Avihingsanon
January 5	Thailand International; Bangkok, Thailand; International Challenge $15,000 – 64MS/64WS/64MD/32WD/64XD	(Thailand) Supanida Katethong; 21–16, 21–16	(South Korea) Kim Hyo-min
January 5	Thailand International; Bangkok, Thailand; International Challenge $15,000 – 64MS/64WS/64MD/32WD/64XD	(South Korea) Jun Bong-chan (South Korea) Kim Duck-young; 21–14, 13–21, 21–14	(Indonesia) Angga Pratama (Indonesia) Ricky Karanda Suwardi
January 5	Thailand International; Bangkok, Thailand; International Challenge $15,000 – 64MS/64WS/64MD/32WD/64XD	(Thailand) Duanganong Aroonkesorn (Thailand) Kunchala Voravichitchaikul; 21–17, 21–19	(South Korea) Chae Yoo-jung (South Korea) Kim Ji-won
January 5	Thailand International; Bangkok, Thailand; International Challenge $15,000 – 64MS/64WS/64MD/32WD/64XD	(South Korea) Choi Sol-kyu (South Korea) Chae Yoo-jung; 18–21, 21–19, 21–12	(Malaysia) Tan Chee Tean (Malaysia) Shevon Jemie Lai
January 5	Estonian International; Tallinn, Estonia; International Series $5,000 – 32MS/32WS/32MD/32WD/32XD	(Finland) Anton Kaisti; 21–16, 21–16	(England) Toby Penty
January 5	Estonian International; Tallinn, Estonia; International Series $5,000 – 32MS/32WS/32MD/32WD/32XD	(Russia) Olga Golovanova; 23–21, 13–21, 21–18	(Estonia) Kati Tolmoff
January 5	Estonian International; Tallinn, Estonia; International Series $5,000 – 32MS/32WS/32MD/32WD/32XD	(France) Laurent Constantin (France) Matthieu Lo Ying Ping; 21–14, 21–19	(Finland) Mika Köngäs (Finland) Jesper Von Hertzen
January 5	Estonian International; Tallinn, Estonia; International Series $5,000 – 32MS/32WS/32MD/32WD/32XD	(Russia) Victoria Dergunova (Russia) Olga Morozova; 21–17, 21–12	(Denmark) Amanda Madsen (Denmark) Isabella Nielsen
January 5	Estonian International; Tallinn, Estonia; International Series $5,000 – 32MS/32WS/32MD/32WD/32XD	(Denmark) Kasper Antonsen (Denmark) Amanda Madsen; 21–17, 21–16	(Germany) Max Weisskirchen (Germany) Eva Janssens
January 12	Malaysia Masters; Kuching, Malaysia; Grand Prix Gold $120,000 – 32MS/32WS/32MD/32WD/32XD; Draw	(South Korea) Lee Hyun-il; 19–21, 21–13, 21–15	(South Korea) Jeon Hyeok-jin
January 12	Malaysia Masters; Kuching, Malaysia; Grand Prix Gold $120,000 – 32MS/32WS/32MD/32WD/32XD; Draw	(Japan) Nozomi Okuhara; 21–13, 21–17	(Japan) Sayaka Takahashi
January 12	Malaysia Masters; Kuching, Malaysia; Grand Prix Gold $120,000 – 32MS/32WS/32MD/32WD/32XD; Draw	(Japan) Kenta Kazuno (Japan) Kazushi Yamada; 21–19, 14–21, 17–21	(Chinese Taipei) Chen Hung-ling (Chinese Taipei) Wang Chi-lin
January 12	Malaysia Masters; Kuching, Malaysia; Grand Prix Gold $120,000 – 32MS/32WS/32MD/32WD/32XD; Draw	(Denmark) Christinna Pedersen (Denmark) Kamilla Rytter Juhl; 21–14, 21–14	(Japan) Naoko Fukuman (Japan) Kurumi Yonao
January 12	Malaysia Masters; Kuching, Malaysia; Grand Prix Gold $120,000 – 32MS/32WS/32MD/32WD/32XD; Draw	(Denmark) Joachim Fischer Nielsen (Denmark) Christinna Pedersen; 21–18, 21–18	(Indonesia) Praveen Jordan (Indonesia) Debby Susanto
January 12	Swedish Masters; Uppsala, Sweden; International Challenge $15,000 – 32MS/32WS/32MD/32WD/32XD	(England) Rajiv Ouseph; 21–15, 21–17	(Spain) Pablo Abián
January 12	Swedish Masters; Uppsala, Sweden; International Challenge $15,000 – 32MS/32WS/32MD/32WD/32XD	(Scotland) Kirsty Gilmour; 21–18, 21–19	(Spain) Beatriz Corrales
January 12	Swedish Masters; Uppsala, Sweden; International Challenge $15,000 – 32MS/32WS/32MD/32WD/32XD	(Denmark) Anders Skaarup Rasmussen (Denmark) Kim Astrup Sorensen; 21–15, 21–11	(Poland) Adam Cwalina (Poland) Przemysław Wacha
January 12	Swedish Masters; Uppsala, Sweden; International Challenge $15,000 – 32MS/32WS/32MD/32WD/32XD	(Russia) Anastasia Chervyakova (Russia) Nina Vislova; 17–21, 23–21, 21–14	(England) Sophie Brown (England) Kate Robertshaw
January 12	Swedish Masters; Uppsala, Sweden; International Challenge $15,000 – 32MS/32WS/32MD/32WD/32XD	(Netherlands) Jacco Arends (Netherlands) Selena Piek; 21–17, 17–21, 21–14	(Russia) Vitalij Durkin (Russia) Nina Vislova
January 19	Syed Modi International Badminton Championships; Lucknow, India; Grand Prix Gold $120,000 – 32MS/32WS/32MD/32WD/32XD	(India) Kashyap Parupalli; 23–21, 23–21	(India) Srikanth Kidambi
January 19	Syed Modi International Badminton Championships; Lucknow, India; Grand Prix Gold $120,000 – 32MS/32WS/32MD/32WD/32XD	(India) Saina Nehwal; 19–21, 25–23, 21–16	(Spain) Carolina Marín
January 19	Syed Modi International Badminton Championships; Lucknow, India; Grand Prix Gold $120,000 – 32MS/32WS/32MD/32WD/32XD	(Denmark) Mathias Boe (Denmark) Carsten Mogensen; 21–9, 22–20	(Russia) Vladimir Ivanov (Russia) Ivan Sozonov
January 19	Syed Modi International Badminton Championships; Lucknow, India; Grand Prix Gold $120,000 – 32MS/32WS/32MD/32WD/32XD	(Malaysia) Amelia Alicia Anscelly (Malaysia) Soong Fie Cho; 22–20, 21–15	(Malaysia) Vivian Hoo (Malaysia) Woon Khe Wei
January 19	Syed Modi International Badminton Championships; Lucknow, India; Grand Prix Gold $120,000 – 32MS/32WS/32MD/32WD/32XD	(Indonesia) Riky Widianto (Indonesia) Richi Puspita Dili; 21–17, 21–17	(India) Manu Attri (India) K. Maneesha
January 19	Iceland International; Reykjavík, Iceland; International Series $5,000 – 32MS/32WS/32MD/32WD/32XD	(Czech Republic) Milan Ludik; 21–9, 21–19	(Austria) Matthias Almer
January 19	Iceland International; Reykjavík, Iceland; International Series $5,000 – 32MS/32WS/32MD/32WD/32XD	(Denmark) Mette Poulsen; 21–11, 21–9	(Finland) Nanna Vainio
January 19	Iceland International; Reykjavík, Iceland; International Series $5,000 – 32MS/32WS/32MD/32WD/32XD	(Scotland) Martin Campbell (Scotland) Patrick MacHugh; 21–16, 21–17	(Denmark) Frederik Aalestrup (Denmark) Kasper Dinesen
January 19	Iceland International; Reykjavík, Iceland; International Series $5,000 – 32MS/32WS/32MD/32WD/32XD	(Denmark) Lena Grebak (Denmark) Maria Helsbol; 21–13, 21–12	(Denmark) Emilie Juul Moller (Denmark) Cecilie Sentow
January 19	Iceland International; Reykjavík, Iceland; International Series $5,000 – 32MS/32WS/32MD/32WD/32XD	(Denmark) Nicklas Mathiasen (Denmark) Cecilie Bjergen; 21–11, 21–15	(Denmark) Lasse Moelhede (Denmark) Trine Villadsen
January 26	China International; Lingshui, China; International Challenge $50,000 – 32MS/32WS/32MD/32WD/32XD	(China) Qiao Bin; 21–14, 21–12	(Japan) Kazumasa Sakai
January 26	China International; Lingshui, China; International Challenge $50,000 – 32MS/32WS/32MD/32WD/32XD	(Japan) Nozomi Okuhara; 21–19, 21–16	(China) Chen Yufei
January 26	China International; Lingshui, China; International Challenge $50,000 – 32MS/32WS/32MD/32WD/32XD	(China) Wang Yilv (China) Zhang Wen; 21–10, 22–20	(China) Li Junhui (China) Liu Yuchen
January 26	China International; Lingshui, China; International Challenge $50,000 – 32MS/32WS/32MD/32WD/32XD	(China) Ou Dongni (China) Yu Xiaohan; 14–21, 21–18, 23–21	(Japan) Ayane Kurihara (Japan) Naru Shinoya
January 26	China International; Lingshui, China; International Challenge $50,000 – 32MS/32WS/32MD/32WD/32XD	(China) Zheng Siwei (China) Chen Qingchen; 15–21, 21–12, 21–13	(China) Liu Yuchen (China) Yu Xiaohan

=== February ===
Week of	Tournament	Champions	Runners-up
February 9	European Mixed Team Badminton Championships; Leuven, Belgium; CC Team Championships; 12 teams (RR); Draw	Denmark; 3–0	England
February 9	Iran Fajr International; Tehran, Iran; International Challenge $15,000 – 32MS/32WS/32MD/32WD	(Austria) David Obernosterer; 21–13, 19–21, 21-17	(Czech Republic) Milan Ludik
February 9	Iran Fajr International; Tehran, Iran; International Challenge $15,000 – 32MS/32WS/32MD/32WD	(Bulgaria) Linda Zechiri; 21–19, 21–14	(Turkey) Neslihan Yiğit
February 9	Iran Fajr International; Tehran, Iran; International Challenge $15,000 – 32MS/32WS/32MD/32WD	(Malaysia) Tai An Khang (Malaysia) Yew Hong Kheng; 21–12, 18–21, 21–16	(Philippines) Aries Delos Santos (Philippines) Alvin Morada
February 9	Iran Fajr International; Tehran, Iran; International Challenge $15,000 – 32MS/32WS/32MD/32WD	(Turkey) Özge Bayrak (Turkey) Neslihan Yiğit; 21–19, 21–18	(Malaysia) Joyce Choong Wai Chi (Malaysia) Yap Cheng Wen
February 9	Oceania Badminton Championships; Auckland, New Zealand; Continental Championships; 56MS/28WS/28MD/28WD/28XD; Draw	(Australia) Daniel Guda; 21–11, 15–21, 21–19	(New Zealand) Luke Charlesworth
February 9	Oceania Badminton Championships; Auckland, New Zealand; Continental Championships; 56MS/28WS/28MD/28WD/28XD; Draw	(Australia) Wendy Chen Hsuan-yu; 21–18, 24–22	(Australia) Joy Lai
February 9	Oceania Badminton Championships; Auckland, New Zealand; Continental Championships; 56MS/28WS/28MD/28WD/28XD; Draw	(Australia) Matthew Chau (Australia) Sawan Serasinghe; 10–21, 21–16, 21–13	(New Zealand) Kevin James Dennerly-Minturn (New Zealand) Oliver Leydon-Davis
February 9	Oceania Badminton Championships; Auckland, New Zealand; Continental Championships; 56MS/28WS/28MD/28WD/28XD; Draw	(Australia) Leanne Choo (Australia) Gronya Somerville; 21–14, 21–11	(Australia) Talia Saunders (Australia) Jennifer Tam
February 9	Oceania Badminton Championships; Auckland, New Zealand; Continental Championships; 56MS/28WS/28MD/28WD/28XD; Draw	(Australia) Robin Middleton (Australia) Leanne Choo; 21–12, 21–14	(New Zealand) Oliver Leydon-Davis (New Zealand) Danielle Tahuri
February 16	Austrian International; Vienna, Austria; International Challenge $15,000 – 32MS/32WS/32MD/32WD/32XD	(Hong Kong) Angus Ng Ka Long; 14–21, 21–18, 21–19	(Malaysia) Iskandar Zulkarnain Zainuddin
February 16	Austrian International; Vienna, Austria; International Challenge $15,000 – 32MS/32WS/32MD/32WD/32XD	(Hong Kong) Cheung Ngan Yi; 21–16, 21–8	(Bulgaria) Linda Zechiri
February 16	Austrian International; Vienna, Austria; International Challenge $15,000 – 32MS/32WS/32MD/32WD/32XD	(Indonesia) Fajar Alfian (Indonesia) Muhammad Rian Ardianto; 23–21, 18–21, 21–19	(England) Peter Briggs (England) Tom Wolfenden
February 16	Austrian International; Vienna, Austria; International Challenge $15,000 – 32MS/32WS/32MD/32WD/32XD	(Indonesia) Suci Rizky Andini (Indonesia) Maretha Dea Giovani; 21–14, 23–21	(England) Heather Olver (England) Lauren Smith
February 16	Austrian International; Vienna, Austria; International Challenge $15,000 – 32MS/32WS/32MD/32WD/32XD	(Indonesia) Edi Subaktiar (Indonesia) Gloria Emanuelle Widjaja; 15–21, 22–20, 21–18	(Indonesia) Ronald Alexander (Indonesia) Melati Daeva Oktaviani
February 16	Uganda International; Lugogo, Uganda; International Series $5,000 – 32MS/32WS/32MD/32WD/32XD	(South Africa) Jacob Maliekal; 11–8, 11–10, 11–2	(Egypt) Ali Ahmed El Khateeb
February 16	Uganda International; Lugogo, Uganda; International Series $5,000 – 32MS/32WS/32MD/32WD/32XD	(Turkey) Ebru Yazgan; 11–9, 8–11, 11–8, 11–7	(Iran) Negin Amiripour
February 16	Uganda International; Lugogo, Uganda; International Series $5,000 – 32MS/32WS/32MD/32WD/32XD	(Czech Republic) Pavel Florian (Czech Republic) Ondrej Kopriva; 7–11, 11–5, 10–11, 11–6, 11–8	(Uganda) Edwin Ekiring (Czech Republic) Milan Ludik
February 16	Uganda International; Lugogo, Uganda; International Series $5,000 – 32MS/32WS/32MD/32WD/32XD	(India) N. Sikki Reddy (India) S. Poorvisha Ram; 11–7, 6–11, 8–11, 11–7, 11–3	(Iran) Negin Amiripour (Iran) Sorayya Aghaei
February 16	Uganda International; Lugogo, Uganda; International Series $5,000 – 32MS/32WS/32MD/32WD/32XD	(India) Tarun Kona (India) N. Sikki Reddy; 11–6, 11–4, 11–6	(Turkey) Muhammed Ali Kurt (Turkey) Kader İnal
February 16	Peru International Series; Lima, Peru; International Series $5,000 – 32MS/32WS/32MD/32WD/32XD	(Guatemala) Kevin Cordón; 21–16, 22–20	(Brazil) Daniel Paiola
February 16	Peru International Series; Lima, Peru; International Series $5,000 – 32MS/32WS/32MD/32WD/32XD	(Turkey) Cemre Fere; 21–10, 21–15	(Turkey) Ebru Tunali
February 16	Peru International Series; Lima, Peru; International Series $5,000 – 32MS/32WS/32MD/32WD/32XD	(Turkey) Emre Vural (Turkey) Sİnan Zorlu; 21–14, 17–21, 21–19	(Brazil) Hugo Arthuso (Brazil) Daniel Paiola
February 16	Peru International Series; Lima, Peru; International Series $5,000 – 32MS/32WS/32MD/32WD/32XD	(Brazil) Lohaynny Vicente (Brazil) Luana Vicente; 21–9, 21–17	(Brazil) Paula Pereira (Brazil) Fabiana Silva
February 16	Peru International Series; Lima, Peru; International Series $5,000 – 32MS/32WS/32MD/32WD/32XD	(Peru) Mario Cuba (Peru) Katherine Winder; 21–13, 21–13	(Peru) Andres Corpancho (Peru) Luz Maria Zornoza
February 23	German Open; Mülheim, Germany; Grand Prix Gold $120,000 – 64MS/32WS/32MD/32WD/32XD; Draw	(Denmark) Jan Ø. Jørgensen; 21–12, 21–13	(Indonesia) Dionysius Hayom Rumbaka
February 23	German Open; Mülheim, Germany; Grand Prix Gold $120,000 – 64MS/32WS/32MD/32WD/32XD; Draw	(South Korea) Sung Ji-hyun; 21–15, 14–21, 21–6	(Spain) Carolina Marín
February 23	German Open; Mülheim, Germany; Grand Prix Gold $120,000 – 64MS/32WS/32MD/32WD/32XD; Draw	(Denmark) Mads Conrad-Petersen (Denmark) Mads Pieler Kolding; 22–20, 21–19	(Russia) Vladimir Ivanov (Russia) Ivan Sozonov
February 23	German Open; Mülheim, Germany; Grand Prix Gold $120,000 – 64MS/32WS/32MD/32WD/32XD; Draw	(Denmark) Kamilla Rytter Juhl (Denmark) Christinna Pedersen; 21–18, 17–21, 21–9	(Indonesia) Della Destiara Haris (Indonesia) Rosyita Eka Putri Sari
February 23	German Open; Mülheim, Germany; Grand Prix Gold $120,000 – 64MS/32WS/32MD/32WD/32XD; Draw	(Denmark) Mads Pieler Kolding (Denmark) Kamilla Rytter Juhl; 21–18, 21–17	(Denmark) Joachim Fischer Nielsen (Denmark) Christinna Pedersen

=== March ===
Week of	Tournament	Champions	Runners-up
March 2	All England Open; Birmingham, England; Super Series Premier $500,000 – 32MS/32WS/32MD/32WD/32XD; 2015 All England Super Series Premier	(China) Chen Long; 15–21, 21–17, 21–15	(Denmark) Jan Ø. Jørgensen
March 2	All England Open; Birmingham, England; Super Series Premier $500,000 – 32MS/32WS/32MD/32WD/32XD; 2015 All England Super Series Premier	(Spain) Carolina Marín; 16–21, 21–14, 21–7	(India) Saina Nehwal
March 2	All England Open; Birmingham, England; Super Series Premier $500,000 – 32MS/32WS/32MD/32WD/32XD; 2015 All England Super Series Premier	(Denmark) Mathias Boe (Denmark) Carsten Mogensen; 21–17, 22–20	(China) Fu Haifeng (China) Zhang Nan
March 2	All England Open; Birmingham, England; Super Series Premier $500,000 – 32MS/32WS/32MD/32WD/32XD; 2015 All England Super Series Premier	(China) Bao Yixin (China) Tang Yuanting; 21–14, 21–14	(China) Wang Xiaoli (China) Yu Yang
March 2	All England Open; Birmingham, England; Super Series Premier $500,000 – 32MS/32WS/32MD/32WD/32XD; 2015 All England Super Series Premier	(China) Zhang Nan (China) Zhao Yunlei; 21–10, 21–10	(Indonesia) Tontowi Ahmad (Indonesia) Lilyana Natsir
March 2	Portugal International; Caldas da Rainha, Portugal; International Series $5,000 – 32MS/32WS/32MD/32WD/32XD	(Japan) Kazumasa Sakai; 21–13, 21–13	(Norway) Marius Myhre
March 2	Portugal International; Caldas da Rainha, Portugal; International Series $5,000 – 32MS/32WS/32MD/32WD/32XD	(Japan) Sayaka Takahashi; 21–13, 21–14	(Japan) Aya Ohori
March 2	Portugal International; Caldas da Rainha, Portugal; International Series $5,000 – 32MS/32WS/32MD/32WD/32XD	(England) Peter Briggs (England) Tom Wolfenden; 21–17, 22–20	(Scotland) Martin Campbell (Scotland) Patrick MacHugh
March 2	Portugal International; Caldas da Rainha, Portugal; International Series $5,000 – 32MS/32WS/32MD/32WD/32XD	(Japan) Ayane Kurihara (Japan) Naru Shinoya; 21–13, 21–16	(Germany) Carola Bott (Germany) Jennifer Karnott
March 2	Portugal International; Caldas da Rainha, Portugal; International Series $5,000 – 32MS/32WS/32MD/32WD/32XD	(Sweden) Filip Michael Duwall Myhren (Sweden) Emma Wengberg; 21–15, 21–18	(Finland) Marko Pyykonen (Estonia) Karoliine Hoim
March 9	Swiss Open; Basel, Switzerland; Grand Prix Gold $120,000 – 64MS/32WS/32MD/32WD/32XD; 2015 Swiss Open Grand Prix Gold	(India) Srikanth Kidambi; 21–15, 12–21, 21–14	(Denmark) Viktor Axelsen
March 9	Swiss Open; Basel, Switzerland; Grand Prix Gold $120,000 – 64MS/32WS/32MD/32WD/32XD; 2015 Swiss Open Grand Prix Gold	(China) Sun Yu; 21–16, 21–12	(Thailand) Busanan Ongbumrungpan
March 9	Swiss Open; Basel, Switzerland; Grand Prix Gold $120,000 – 64MS/32WS/32MD/32WD/32XD; 2015 Swiss Open Grand Prix Gold	(China) Cai Yun (China) Lu Kai; 21–19, 14–21, 21–17	(Malaysia) Goh V Shem (Malaysia) Tan Wee Kiong
March 9	Swiss Open; Basel, Switzerland; Grand Prix Gold $120,000 – 64MS/32WS/32MD/32WD/32XD; 2015 Swiss Open Grand Prix Gold	(China) Bao Yixin (China) Tang Yuanting; 21–19, 14–21, 21–17	(Japan) Ayane Kurihara (Japan) Naru Shinoya
March 9	Swiss Open; Basel, Switzerland; Grand Prix Gold $120,000 – 64MS/32WS/32MD/32WD/32XD; 2015 Swiss Open Grand Prix Gold	(China) Lu Kai (China) Huang Yaqiong; 17–21, 22–20, 21–13	(China) Liu Cheng (China) Bao Yixin
March 9	Mercosul International; Foz do Iguaçu, Brazil; International Challenge $15,000 – 32MS/32WS/32MD/32WD/32XD	(Guatemala) Kevin Cordón; 21–14, 21–17	(Norway) Marius Myhre
March 9	Mercosul International; Foz do Iguaçu, Brazil; International Challenge $15,000 – 32MS/32WS/32MD/32WD/32XD	(United States) Rong Schafer; 17–21, 21–13, 21–15	(Brazil) Lohaynny Vicente
March 9	Mercosul International; Foz do Iguaçu, Brazil; International Challenge $15,000 – 32MS/32WS/32MD/32WD/32XD	(Belgium) Matijs Dierickx (Belgium) Freek Golinski; 21–13, 8–21, 21–19	(United States) Phillip Chew (United States) Sattawat Pongnairat
March 9	Mercosul International; Foz do Iguaçu, Brazil; International Challenge $15,000 – 32MS/32WS/32MD/32WD/32XD	(Turkey) Özge Bayrak (Turkey) Neslihan Yiğit; 21–10, 21–11	(France) Laura Choinet (France) Teshana Vignes Waran
March 9	Mercosul International; Foz do Iguaçu, Brazil; International Challenge $15,000 – 32MS/32WS/32MD/32WD/32XD	(United States) Phillip Chew (United States) Jamie Subandhi; 21–11, 21–17	(Canada) Kevin Li (Canada) Rachel Honderich
March 9	Romanian International; Timișoara, Romania; International Series $5,000 – 32MS/32WS/32MD/32WD/32XD	(Indonesia) Adi Pratama; 12–10, 11–6, 11–9	(Italy) Indra Bagus Ade Chandra
March 9	Romanian International; Timișoara, Romania; International Series $5,000 – 32MS/32WS/32MD/32WD/32XD	(Belgium) Lianne Tan; 11–7, 11–7, 12–10	(England) Chloe Birch
March 9	Romanian International; Timișoara, Romania; International Series $5,000 – 32MS/32WS/32MD/32WD/32XD	(Croatia) Zvonimir Đurkinjak (Croatia) Zvonimir Hölbling; 11–9, 11–8, 11–7	(Poland) Milosz Bochat (Poland) Pawel Pietryja
March 9	Romanian International; Timișoara, Romania; International Series $5,000 – 32MS/32WS/32MD/32WD/32XD	(England) Chloe Birch (England) Jenny Wallwork; 11–6, 14–12, 8–11, 11–8	(France) Lea Palermo (France) Anne Tran
March 9	Romanian International; Timișoara, Romania; International Series $5,000 – 32MS/32WS/32MD/32WD/32XD	(India) Tarun Kona (India) N. Siki Reddy; 11–7, 11–8, 11–4	(Germany) Jones Rafli Jansen (Germany) Cisita Joity Jansen
March 16	Vietnam International; Hanoi, Vietnam; International Challenge $15,000 – 32MS/32WS/32MD/32WD/32XD	(Indonesia) Firman Abdul Kholik; 20–22, 21–14, 21–18	(Thailand) Khosit Phetpradab
March 16	Vietnam International; Hanoi, Vietnam; International Challenge $15,000 – 32MS/32WS/32MD/32WD/32XD	(Japan) Kana Ito; 14–21, 21–18, 18–11	(Indonesia) Aprilia Yuswandari
March 16	Vietnam International; Hanoi, Vietnam; International Challenge $15,000 – 32MS/32WS/32MD/32WD/32XD	(Chinese Taipei) Lu Ching-yao (Chinese Taipei) Tien Tzu-chieh; 21–13, 14–21, 23–21	(Singapore) Terry Hee Yong Kai (Singapore) Hendra Wijaya
March 16	Vietnam International; Hanoi, Vietnam; International Challenge $15,000 – 32MS/32WS/32MD/32WD/32XD	(Indonesia) Anggia Shitta Awanda (Indonesia) Ni Ketut Mahadewi Istirani; 21–10, 21–18	(Thailand) Chayanit Chaladchalam (Thailand) Phataimas Muenwong
March 16	Vietnam International; Hanoi, Vietnam; International Challenge $15,000 – 32MS/32WS/32MD/32WD/32XD	(Indonesia) Fran Kurniawan (Indonesia) Komala Dewi; 21–14, 21–11	(Indonesia) Hafiz Faisal (Indonesia) Masita Mahmudin
March 16	Polish Open; Warsaw, Poland; International Challenge $15,000 – 32MS/32WS/32MD/32WD/32XD	(Malaysia) Liew Daren; 21–15, 21–11	(Denmark) Emil Holst
March 16	Polish Open; Warsaw, Poland; International Challenge $15,000 – 32MS/32WS/32MD/32WD/32XD	(Germany) Karin Schnaase; 21–19, 21–15	(Ukraine) Marija Ulitina
March 16	Polish Open; Warsaw, Poland; International Challenge $15,000 – 32MS/32WS/32MD/32WD/32XD	(Japan) Kenta Kazuno (Japan) Kazushi Yamada; 21–19, 21–12	(Poland) Adam Cwalina (Poland) Przemysław Wacha
March 16	Polish Open; Warsaw, Poland; International Challenge $15,000 – 32MS/32WS/32MD/32WD/32XD	(India) Pradnya Gadre (India) N. Sikki Reddy; 21–16, 21–18	(Canada) Alexandra Bruce (Canada) Phyllis Chan
March 16	Polish Open; Warsaw, Poland; International Challenge $15,000 – 32MS/32WS/32MD/32WD/32XD	(Malaysia) Chan Peng Soon (Malaysia) Goh Liu Ying; 28–26, 21–18	(India) Akshay Dewalkar (India) Pradnya Gadre
March 16	Jamaica International; Kingston, Jamaica; International Series $5,000 – 32MS/32WS/32MD/32WD/32XD	(Canada) Martin Giuffre; 21–14, 21–16	(Turkey) Emre Vural
March 16	Jamaica International; Kingston, Jamaica; International Series $5,000 – 32MS/32WS/32MD/32WD/32XD	(Turkey) Ebru Tunali; 18–21, 21–10, 21–17	(Czech Republic) Zuzana Pavelkova
March 16	Jamaica International; Kingston, Jamaica; International Series $5,000 – 32MS/32WS/32MD/32WD/32XD	(Guatemala) Solis Jonathan (Guatemala) Rodolfo Ramirez; 18–21, 21–15, 21–12	(Turkey) Emre Vural (Turkey) Sİnan Zorlu
March 16	Jamaica International; Kingston, Jamaica; International Series $5,000 – 32MS/32WS/32MD/32WD/32XD	(Turkey) Cemre Fere (Turkey) Ebru Tunali; 21–17, 21–16	(Turkey) Neslihan Kilic (Turkey) Ebru Yazgan
March 16	Jamaica International; Kingston, Jamaica; International Series $5,000 – 32MS/32WS/32MD/32WD/32XD	(Turkey) Ramazan Ozturk (Turkey) Neslihan Kilic; 21–18, 21–12	(Guatemala) Solis Jonathan (Guatemala) Nikté Sotomayor
March 23	India Open; New Delhi, India; Super Series $275,000 – 32MS/32WS/32MD/32WD/32XD; Draw	(India) Srikanth Kidambi; 21–18, 13–21, 12–21	(Denmark) Viktor Axelsen
March 23	India Open; New Delhi, India; Super Series $275,000 – 32MS/32WS/32MD/32WD/32XD; Draw	(India) Saina Nehwal; 21–16, 21–14	(Thailand) Ratchanok Intanon
March 23	India Open; New Delhi, India; Super Series $275,000 – 32MS/32WS/32MD/32WD/32XD; Draw	(China) Chai Biao (China) Hong Wei; 21–18, 21–14	(Denmark) Mads Conrad-Petersen (Denmark) Mads Pieler Kolding
March 23	India Open; New Delhi, India; Super Series $275,000 – 32MS/32WS/32MD/32WD/32XD; Draw	(Japan) Misaki Matsutomo (Japan) Ayaka Takahashi; 21–19, 21–19	(China) Luo Ying (China) Luo Yu
March 23	India Open; New Delhi, India; Super Series $275,000 – 32MS/32WS/32MD/32WD/32XD; Draw	(China) Liu Cheng (China) Bao Yixin; 21–19, 21–19	(Denmark) Joachim Fischer Nielsen (Denmark) Christinna Pedersen
March 23	Giraldilla International; Havana, Cuba; International Series $5,000 – 32MS/32WS/32MD/32WD/32XD	(Cuba) Osleni Guerrero; 21–16, 21–16	(United States) Howard Shu
March 23	Giraldilla International; Havana, Cuba; International Series $5,000 – 32MS/32WS/32MD/32WD/32XD	(Turkey) Ebru Tunali; 21–15, 21–8	(Hungary) Laura Sarosi
March 23	Giraldilla International; Havana, Cuba; International Series $5,000 – 32MS/32WS/32MD/32WD/32XD	(Italy) Giovanni Greco (Italy) Rosario Maddaloni; 21–17, 21–15	(Guatemala) Humblers Heymard (Guatemala) Anibal Marroquin
March 23	Giraldilla International; Havana, Cuba; International Series $5,000 – 32MS/32WS/32MD/32WD/32XD	(Turkey) Cemre Fere (Turkey) Ebru Tunali; Walkover	(Turkey) Neslihan Kilic (Turkey) Ebru Yazgan
March 23	Giraldilla International; Havana, Cuba; International Series $5,000 – 32MS/32WS/32MD/32WD/32XD	(Peru) Mario Cuba (Peru) Katherine Winder; Walkover	(Turkey) Ramazan Ozturk (Turkey) Neslihan Kilic
March 23	Orleans International Badminton; Orléans, France; International Challenge $15,000 – 32MS/32WS/32MD/32WD/32XD	(Ukraine) Dmytro Zavadsky; 24–22, 21–17	(Indonesia) Andre Kurniawan Tedjono
March 23	Orleans International Badminton; Orléans, France; International Challenge $15,000 – 32MS/32WS/32MD/32WD/32XD	(Denmark) Natalia Koch Rohde; 21–15, 11–7 Retired	(Netherlands) Soraya de Visch Eijbergen
March 23	Orleans International Badminton; Orléans, France; International Challenge $15,000 – 32MS/32WS/32MD/32WD/32XD	(England) Matthew Nottingham (England) Harley Towler; 21–12, 21–18	(Poland) Adam Cwalina (Poland) Przemysław Wacha
March 23	Orleans International Badminton; Orléans, France; International Challenge $15,000 – 32MS/32WS/32MD/32WD/32XD	(Bulgaria) Gabriela Stoeva (Bulgaria) Stefani Stoeva; 22–20, 16–21, 21–9	(England) Heather Olver (England) Lauren Smith
March 23	Orleans International Badminton; Orléans, France; International Challenge $15,000 – 32MS/32WS/32MD/32WD/32XD	(Denmark) Mathias Christiansen (Denmark) Lena Grebak; 11–21, 21–17, 21–19	(Malaysia) Chan Peng Soon (Malaysia) Goh Liu Ying
March 30	Malaysia Open; Kuala Lumpur, Malaysia; Super Series Premier $500,000 – 64MS/32WS/32MD/32WD/32XD; Draw	(China) Chen Long; 20–22, 21–13, 21–11	(China) Lin Dan
March 30	Malaysia Open; Kuala Lumpur, Malaysia; Super Series Premier $500,000 – 64MS/32WS/32MD/32WD/32XD; Draw	(Spain) Carolina Marín; 19–21, 21–19, 21–17	(China) Li Xuerui
March 30	Malaysia Open; Kuala Lumpur, Malaysia; Super Series Premier $500,000 – 64MS/32WS/32MD/32WD/32XD; Draw	(Indonesia) Mohammad Ahsan (Indonesia) Hendra Setiawan; 14–21, 21–15, 23–21	(South Korea) Lee Yong-dae (South Korea) Yoo Yeon-seong
March 30	Malaysia Open; Kuala Lumpur, Malaysia; Super Series Premier $500,000 – 64MS/32WS/32MD/32WD/32XD; Draw	(China) Luo Ying (China) Luo Yu; 21–18, 21–9	(South Korea) Jang Ye-na (South Korea) Jung Kyung-eun
March 30	Malaysia Open; Kuala Lumpur, Malaysia; Super Series Premier $500,000 – 64MS/32WS/32MD/32WD/32XD; Draw	(China) Zhang Nan (China) Zhao Yunlei; 21–16, 21–14	(China) Xu Chen (China) Ma Jin
March 30	Osaka International; Osaka, Japan; International Challenge $15,000 – 32MS/32WS/32MD/32WD/32XD	(South Korea) Jeon Hyeok-jin; 15–21, 21–17, 21–14	(Japan) Kazumasa Sakai
March 30	Osaka International; Osaka, Japan; International Challenge $15,000 – 32MS/32WS/32MD/32WD/32XD	(Japan) Sayaka Takahashi; 21–11, 15–21, 29–27	(Japan) Sayaka Sato
March 30	Osaka International; Osaka, Japan; International Challenge $15,000 – 32MS/32WS/32MD/32WD/32XD	(Japan) Kenta Kazuno (Japan) Kazushi Yamada; 21–9, 21–19	(Japan) Takuto Inoue (Japan) Yuki Kaneko
March 30	Osaka International; Osaka, Japan; International Challenge $15,000 – 32MS/32WS/32MD/32WD/32XD	(China) Chen Qingchen (China) Jia Yifan; 21–17, 21–15	(Japan) Yuki Fukushima (Japan) Sayaka Hirota
March 30	Osaka International; Osaka, Japan; International Challenge $15,000 – 32MS/32WS/32MD/32WD/32XD	(South Korea) Kim Duck-young (South Korea) Eom Hye-won; 21–17, 16–21, 21–17	(China) Liu Yuchen (China) Huang Dongping
March 30	Finnish Open; Vantaa, Finland; International Challenge $15,000 – 32MS/32WS/32MD/32WD/32XD	(Russia) Vladimir Malkov; 21–18, 21–15	(Finland) Eetu Heino
March 30	Finnish Open; Vantaa, Finland; International Challenge $15,000 – 32MS/32WS/32MD/32WD/32XD	(Spain) Beatriz Corrales; 21–19, 21–12	(Indonesia) Febby Angguni
March 30	Finnish Open; Vantaa, Finland; International Challenge $15,000 – 32MS/32WS/32MD/32WD/32XD	(England) Andrew Ellis (England) Peter Mills; 21–19, 21–12	(Denmark) Mathias Christiansen (Denmark) David Daugaard
March 30	Finnish Open; Vantaa, Finland; International Challenge $15,000 – 32MS/32WS/32MD/32WD/32XD	(England) Heather Olver (England) Lauren Smith; 21–13, 23–21	(France) Delphine Lansac (France) Emilie Lefel
March 30	Finnish Open; Vantaa, Finland; International Challenge $15,000 – 32MS/32WS/32MD/32WD/32XD	(Russia) Anatoliy Yartsev (Russia) Evgeniya Kosetskaya; 21–16, 17–21, 10–21	(France) Gaetan Mittelheisser (France) Audrey Fontaine

=== April ===
Week of	Tournament	Champions	Runners-up
April 6	Singapore Open; Singapore; Super Series $300,000 – 32MS/32WS/32MD/32WD/32XD; Draw	(Japan) Kento Momota; 21–17, 16–21, 21–15	(Hong Kong) Hu Yun
April 6	Singapore Open; Singapore; Super Series $300,000 – 32MS/32WS/32MD/32WD/32XD; Draw	(China) Sun Yu; 21–13, 19–21, 22–20	(Chinese Taipei) Tai Tzu-ying
April 6	Singapore Open; Singapore; Super Series $300,000 – 32MS/32WS/32MD/32WD/32XD; Draw	(Indonesia) Angga Pratama (Indonesia) Ricky Karanda Suwardi; 21–15, 11–21, 21–14	(China) Fu Haifeng (China) Zhang Nan
April 6	Singapore Open; Singapore; Super Series $300,000 – 32MS/32WS/32MD/32WD/32XD; Draw	(China) Ou Dongni (China) Yu Xiaohan; 21–17, 21–16	(Japan) Misaki Matsutomo (Japan) Ayaka Takahashi
April 6	Singapore Open; Singapore; Super Series $300,000 – 32MS/32WS/32MD/32WD/32XD; Draw	(China) Zhang Nan (China) Zhao Yunlei; Walkover	(China) Lu Kai (China) Huang Yaqiong
April 6	Croatian International; Zagreb, Croatia; International Series $5,000 – 32MS/32WS/32MD/32WD/32XD	(Netherlands) Eric Pang; 21–16, 21–12	(Netherlands) Nick Fransman
April 6	Croatian International; Zagreb, Croatia; International Series $5,000 – 32MS/32WS/32MD/32WD/32XD	(Russia) Elena Komendrovskaja; 21–9, 21–18	(Russia) Olga Golovanova
April 6	Croatian International; Zagreb, Croatia; International Series $5,000 – 32MS/32WS/32MD/32WD/32XD	(England) Peter Briggs (England) Tom Wolfenden; 21–19, 21–10	(Malaysia) Lim Ming Chuen (Malaysia) Ong Wei Khoon
April 6	Croatian International; Zagreb, Croatia; International Series $5,000 – 32MS/32WS/32MD/32WD/32XD	(Denmark) Maiken Fruergaard (Denmark) Camilla Martens; 21–16, 19–21, 21–19	(Denmark) Julie Finne-Ipsen (Denmark) Ditte Søby Hansen
April 6	Croatian International; Zagreb, Croatia; International Series $5,000 – 32MS/32WS/32MD/32WD/32XD	(Croatia) Zvonimir Đurkinjak (Croatia) Matea Čiča; 21–17, 21–13	(Denmark) Alexander Bond (Denmark) Ditte Søby Hansen
April 13	China Masters; Jiangsu, China; Grand Prix Gold $250,000 – 32MS/16WS/32MD/16WD/32XD; Draw	(China) Wang Zhengming; 22–20, 21–19	(China) Huang Yuxiang
April 13	China Masters; Jiangsu, China; Grand Prix Gold $250,000 – 32MS/16WS/32MD/16WD/32XD; Draw	(China) He Bingjiao; 21–13, 21–9	(China) Hui Xirui
April 13	China Masters; Jiangsu, China; Grand Prix Gold $250,000 – 32MS/16WS/32MD/16WD/32XD; Draw	(China) Li Junhui (China) Liu Yuchen; 21–15, 19–21, 21–12	(China) Wang Yilyu (China) Zhang Wen
April 13	China Masters; Jiangsu, China; Grand Prix Gold $250,000 – 32MS/16WS/32MD/16WD/32XD; Draw	(China) Tang Jinhua (China) Zhong Qianxin; 21–14, 11–21, 21–17	(China) Bao Yixin (China) Tang Yuanting
April 13	China Masters; Jiangsu, China; Grand Prix Gold $250,000 – 32MS/16WS/32MD/16WD/32XD; Draw	(China) Liu Cheng (China) Bao Yixin; 18–21, 21–15, 26–24	(Indonesia) Edi Subaktiar (Indonesia) Gloria Emanuelle Widjaja
April 13	USM International; Semarang, Indonesia; International Series $10,000 – 32MS/32WS/32MD/32WD/32XD	(Indonesia) Wisnu Yuli Prasetyo; 25–23, 21–14	(Indonesia) Reksy Aureza Megananda
April 13	USM International; Semarang, Indonesia; International Series $10,000 – 32MS/32WS/32MD/32WD/32XD	(Indonesia) Fitriani; 13–21, 21–13, 21–13	(Indonesia) Aprilia Yuswandari
April 13	USM International; Semarang, Indonesia; International Series $10,000 – 32MS/32WS/32MD/32WD/32XD	(Indonesia) Fajar Alfian (Indonesia) Muhammad Rian Ardianto; 21–12, 17–21, 21–15	(Indonesia) Hantoro (Indonesia) Rian Swastedian
April 13	USM International; Semarang, Indonesia; International Series $10,000 – 32MS/32WS/32MD/32WD/32XD	(Indonesia) Gebby Ristiyani Imawan (Indonesia) Tiara Rosalia Nuraidah; 21–13, 21–11	(Indonesia) Anggia Shitta Awanda (Indonesia) Ni Ketut Mahadewi Istarani
April 13	USM International; Semarang, Indonesia; International Series $10,000 – 32MS/32WS/32MD/32WD/32XD	(Indonesia) Irfan Fadhilah (Indonesia) Weni Anggraini; 21–16, 21–16	(Indonesia) Panji Akbar Sudrajat (Indonesia) Apriani
April 13	Dutch International; Wateringen, Netherland; International Series $10,000 – 32MS/32WS/32MD/32WD/32XD	(Denmark) Anders Antonsen; 21–11, 22–20	(Belgium) Yuhan Tan
April 13	Dutch International; Wateringen, Netherland; International Series $10,000 – 32MS/32WS/32MD/32WD/32XD	(Belgium) Lianne Tan; 21–17, 21–18	(Netherlands) Soraya de Visch Eijbergen
April 13	Dutch International; Wateringen, Netherland; International Series $10,000 – 32MS/32WS/32MD/32WD/32XD	(Denmark) Kasper Antonsen (Denmark) Oliver Babic; 21–9, 21–15	(Germany) Johannes Pistorius (Germany) Marvin Seidel
April 13	Dutch International; Wateringen, Netherland; International Series $10,000 – 32MS/32WS/32MD/32WD/32XD	(Netherlands) Gayle Mahulette (Netherlands) Cheryl Seinen; 21–14, 23–21	(Netherlands) Myke Halkema (Netherlands) Lisa Malaihollo
April 13	Dutch International; Wateringen, Netherland; International Series $10,000 – 32MS/32WS/32MD/32WD/32XD	(Denmark) Amanda Madsen (Denmark) Kasper Antonsen; 21–19, 12–21, 21–18	(Denmark) Maja Rindshoej (Denmark) Kristoffer Knudsen
April 13	Waikato International; Hamilton, New Zealand; Future Series; 64MS/32WS/32MD/32WD/32XD	(South Africa) Jacob Maliekal; 20–22, 21–19, 22–20	(Australia) James Eunson
April 13	Waikato International; Hamilton, New Zealand; Future Series; 64MS/32WS/32MD/32WD/32XD	(Australia) Joy Lai; 21–18, 18–21, 21–17	(Australia) Alice Wu
April 13	Waikato International; Hamilton, New Zealand; Future Series; 64MS/32WS/32MD/32WD/32XD	(Australia) Matthew Chau (Australia) Sawan Serasinghe; 21–16, 21–15	(Pakistan) Rizwan Azam (Australia) Michael Fariman
April 13	Waikato International; Hamilton, New Zealand; Future Series; 64MS/32WS/32MD/32WD/32XD	(Australia) Setyana Mapasa (Australia) Gronya Somerville; 21–13, 21–10	(Australia) Ruwindi Serasinghe (Australia) Alice Wu
April 13	Waikato International; Hamilton, New Zealand; Future Series; 64MS/32WS/32MD/32WD/32XD	(Australia) Sawan Serasinghe (Australia) Setyana Mapasa; 21–13, 21–17	(Australia) Matthew Chau (Australia) Gronya Somerville
April 20	Badminton Asia Championships; Wuhan, China; Continental Championships $200,000 – 32MS/32WS/32MD/32WD/32XD; Draw	(China) Lin Dan; 21–19, 21–8	(China) Tian Houwei
April 20	Badminton Asia Championships; Wuhan, China; Continental Championships $200,000 – 32MS/32WS/32MD/32WD/32XD; Draw	(Thailand) Ratchanok Intanon; 20–22, 23–21, 21–12	(China) Li Xuerui
April 20	Badminton Asia Championships; Wuhan, China; Continental Championships $200,000 – 32MS/32WS/32MD/32WD/32XD; Draw	(South Korea) Lee Yong-dae (South Korea) Yoo Yeon-seong; 18–21, 24–22, 21–19	(Indonesia) Mohammad Ahsan (Indonesia) Hendra Setiawan
April 20	Badminton Asia Championships; Wuhan, China; Continental Championships $200,000 – 32MS/32WS/32MD/32WD/32XD; Draw	(China) Ma Jin (China) Tang Yuanting; 21–12, 21–12	(China) Wang Xiaoli (China) Yu Yang
April 20	Badminton Asia Championships; Wuhan, China; Continental Championships $200,000 – 32MS/32WS/32MD/32WD/32XD; Draw	(Indonesia) Tontowi Ahmad (Indonesia) Liliyana Natsir; 21–16, 21–15	(Hong Kong) Lee Chun Hei (Hong Kong) Chau Hoi Wah
April 20	Peru International; Lima, Peru; International Challenge $15,000 – 32MS/32WS/32MD/32WD/32XD	(France) Thomas Rouxel; 21–12, 21–13	(France) Lucas Corvée
April 20	Peru International; Lima, Peru; International Challenge $15,000 – 32MS/32WS/32MD/32WD/32XD	(United States) Rong Schafer; 21–17, 21–16	(Turkey) Neslihan Yiğit
April 20	Peru International; Lima, Peru; International Challenge $15,000 – 32MS/32WS/32MD/32WD/32XD	(Poland) Adam Cwalina (Poland) Przemysław Wacha; 21–18, 21–11	(France) Lucas Claerbout (France) Lucas Corvee
April 20	Peru International; Lima, Peru; International Challenge $15,000 – 32MS/32WS/32MD/32WD/32XD	(France) Delphine Lansac (France) Émilie Lefel; 14–21, 21–14, 21–13	(Turkey) Özge Bayrak (Turkey) Neslihan Yiğit
April 20	Peru International; Lima, Peru; International Challenge $15,000 – 32MS/32WS/32MD/32WD/32XD	(France) Ronan Labar (France) Émilie Lefel; 21–18, 13–21, 21–14	(France) Baptiste Carême (France) Anne Tran
April 27	New Zealand Open; Auckland, New Zealand; Grand Prix Gold $120,000 – 64MS/32WS/32MD/32WD/32XD; Draw	(South Korea) Lee Hyun-il; 21–12, 21–14	(China) Qiao Bin
April 27	New Zealand Open; Auckland, New Zealand; Grand Prix Gold $120,000 – 64MS/32WS/32MD/32WD/32XD; Draw	(Japan) Saena Kawakami; 21–16, 21–18	(China) He Bingjiao
April 27	New Zealand Open; Auckland, New Zealand; Grand Prix Gold $120,000 – 64MS/32WS/32MD/32WD/32XD; Draw	(China) Huang Kaixiang (China) Zheng Siwei; 16–21, 21–17, 21–9	(Indonesia) Fajar Alfian (Indonesia) Muhammad Rian Ardianto
April 27	New Zealand Open; Auckland, New Zealand; Grand Prix Gold $120,000 – 64MS/32WS/32MD/32WD/32XD; Draw	(China) Xia Huan (China) Zhong Qianxin; 17–21, 24–22, 21–19	(Japan) Yuki Fukushima (Japan) Sayaka Hirota
April 27	New Zealand Open; Auckland, New Zealand; Grand Prix Gold $120,000 – 64MS/32WS/32MD/32WD/32XD; Draw	(China) Zheng Siwei (China) Chen Qingchen; 21–14, 21–8	(China) Yu Xiaoyu (China) Xia Huan
April 27	Hellas International; Sidirokastro, Greece; International Series $5,000 – 32MS/32WS/32MD/32WD/32XD	(Germany) Fabian Roth; 21–19, 19–21, 21–19	(England) Toby Penty
April 27	Hellas International; Sidirokastro, Greece; International Series $5,000 – 32MS/32WS/32MD/32WD/32XD	(England) Fontaine Chapman; 21–9, 14–6 Retired	(Bulgaria) Linda Zetchiri
April 27	Hellas International; Sidirokastro, Greece; International Series $5,000 – 32MS/32WS/32MD/32WD/32XD	(Poland) Miłosz Bochat (Poland) Paweł Pietryja; 13–21, 24–22, 21–13	(Russia) Vladimir Rusin (Russia) Iiya Zdanov
April 27	Hellas International; Sidirokastro, Greece; International Series $5,000 – 32MS/32WS/32MD/32WD/32XD	(Belgium) Steffi Annys (Belgium) Flore Vandenhoucke; 21–17, 21–12	(Finland) Mathilda Lindholm (Finland) Jenny Nyström
April 27	Hellas International; Sidirokastro, Greece; International Series $5,000 – 32MS/32WS/32MD/32WD/32XD	(Russia) Iiya Zdanov (Russia) Tatjana Bibik; 21–10, 28–26	(Poland) Paweł Pietryja (Poland) Aneta Wojtkowska
April 27	Chile International; Temuco, Chile; International Series $5,000 – 32MS/32WS/32MD/32WD/32XD	(Cuba) Osleni Guerrero; 21–9, 21–15	(Turkey) Ramazan Öztürk
April 27	Chile International; Temuco, Chile; International Series $5,000 – 32MS/32WS/32MD/32WD/32XD	(Hungary) Laura Sárosi; 21–13, 9–21, 21–12	(Brazil) Lohaynny Vicente
April 27	Chile International; Temuco, Chile; International Series $5,000 – 32MS/32WS/32MD/32WD/32XD	(Mexico) Job Castillo (Mexico) Lino Muñoz; 21-17, 21-10	(Guatemala) Rodolfo Ramírez (Guatemala) Jonathan Solís
April 27	Chile International; Temuco, Chile; International Series $5,000 – 32MS/32WS/32MD/32WD/32XD	(Brazil) Lohaynny Vicente (Brazil) Luana Vicente; 21-18, 21-13	(Brazil) Paula Pereira (Brazil) Fabiana Silva
April 27	Chile International; Temuco, Chile; International Series $5,000 – 32MS/32WS/32MD/32WD/32XD	(Peru) Mario Cuba (Peru) Katherine Winder; 21-18, 21-16	(Brazil) Alex Yuwan Tjong (Brazil) Lohaynny Vicente

=== May ===
Week of	Tournament	Champions	Runners-up
May 4	Smiling Fish International; Trang, Thailand; International Series $5,000 – 32MS/32WS/32MD/32WD/32XD	(Indonesia) Andre Marteen; 21–19, 23–21	(Indonesia) Vega Vio Nirwanda
May 4	Smiling Fish International; Trang, Thailand; International Series $5,000 – 32MS/32WS/32MD/32WD/32XD	(Thailand) Supanida Katethong; 21–14, 21–17	(Thailand) Sarita Suwannakitborihan
May 4	Smiling Fish International; Trang, Thailand; International Series $5,000 – 32MS/32WS/32MD/32WD/32XD	(Thailand) Wannawat Ampunsuwan (Thailand) Tinn Isriyanate; 26–24, 22–20	(Indonesia) Yahya Adi Kumara (Indonesia) Yantoni Edy Saputra
May 4	Smiling Fish International; Trang, Thailand; International Series $5,000 – 32MS/32WS/32MD/32WD/32XD	(Thailand) Supanida Katethong (Thailand) Panjarat Pransopon; 21–13, 21–8	(Thailand) Thidarat Kleebyeesoon (Thailand) Ruethaichanok Laisuan
May 4	Smiling Fish International; Trang, Thailand; International Series $5,000 – 32MS/32WS/32MD/32WD/32XD	(Thailand) Parinyawat Thongnuam (Thailand) Phataimas Muenwong; 21–16, 21–13	(Indonesia) Beno Drajat (Indonesia) Yulfira Barkah
May 4	Slovenia International; Medvode, Slovenia; International Series $5,000 – 32MS/32WS/32MD/32WD/32XD	(Ukraine) Dmytro Zavadsky; 12–21, 21–19, 22–20	(Finland) Kalle Koljonen
May 4	Slovenia International; Medvode, Slovenia; International Series $5,000 – 32MS/32WS/32MD/32WD/32XD	(Ukraine) Marija Ulitina; 17–21, 21–17, 21–12	(Denmark) Mia Blichfeldt
May 4	Slovenia International; Medvode, Slovenia; International Series $5,000 – 32MS/32WS/32MD/32WD/32XD	(Croatia) Zvonimir Đurkinjak (Croatia) Zvonimir Hölbling; 21–14, 16–21, 21–10	(Germany) Johannes Pistorius (Germany) Marvin Emil Seidel
May 4	Slovenia International; Medvode, Slovenia; International Series $5,000 – 32MS/32WS/32MD/32WD/32XD	(Germany) Linda Efler (Germany) Lara Kaepplein; 21–18, 19–21, 21–18	(England) Chloe Birch (England) Jenny Wallwork
May 4	Slovenia International; Medvode, Slovenia; International Series $5,000 – 32MS/32WS/32MD/32WD/32XD	(France) Bastian Kersaudy (France) Lea Palermo; 21–17, 18–21, 21–16	(France) Marin Baumann (France) Lorraine Baumann
May 11	Sudirman Cup; Dongguan, China; BWF Mixed Team Championships; Draw	China; 3–0	Japan
May 18	Trinidad and Tobago International; Saint Augustine, Trinidad and Tobago; International Series $5,000 – 32MS/32WS/32MD/32WD/32XD	(Canada) Martin Giuffre; 18–21, 25–23, 22–20	(Mexico) Luis Ramon Garrido
May 18	Trinidad and Tobago International; Saint Augustine, Trinidad and Tobago; International Series $5,000 – 32MS/32WS/32MD/32WD/32XD	(Austria) Elisabeth Baldauf; 16–21, 21–16, 21–10	(Italy) Jeanine Cicognini
May 18	Trinidad and Tobago International; Saint Augustine, Trinidad and Tobago; International Series $5,000 – 32MS/32WS/32MD/32WD/32XD	(Mexico) Luis Ramon Garrido (Mexico) Lino Munoz; 21–16, 22–24, 21–19	(Mexico) Job Castillo (Mexico) Antonio Ocegueda
May 18	Trinidad and Tobago International; Saint Augustine, Trinidad and Tobago; International Series $5,000 – 32MS/32WS/32MD/32WD/32XD	(Mexico) Haramara Gaitan (Mexico) Sabrina Solis; 19–21, 23–21, 23–21	(Mexico) Cynthia Gonzalez (Mexico) Mariana Ugalde
May 18	Trinidad and Tobago International; Saint Augustine, Trinidad and Tobago; International Series $5,000 – 32MS/32WS/32MD/32WD/32XD	(Austria) David Obernosterer (Austria) Elisabeth Baldauf; 21–15, 21–19	(Mexico) Lino Munoz (Mexico) Cynthia Gonzalez
May 18	Spanish International; Madrid, Spain; International Challenge $15,000 – 32MS/32WS/24MD/24WD/24XD	(Spain) Pablo Abián; 21–16, 13–21, 21–10	(Denmark) Rasmus Fladberg
May 18	Spanish International; Madrid, Spain; International Challenge $15,000 – 32MS/32WS/24MD/24WD/24XD	(United States) Iris Wang; 13–21, 21–14, 21–15	(Spain) Beatriz Corrales
May 18	Spanish International; Madrid, Spain; International Challenge $15,000 – 32MS/32WS/24MD/24WD/24XD	(Poland) Adam Cwalina (Poland) Przemysław Wacha; 21–17, 21–14	(Denmark) Kasper Antonsen (Denmark) Oliver Babic
May 18	Spanish International; Madrid, Spain; International Challenge $15,000 – 32MS/32WS/24MD/24WD/24XD	(Bulgaria) Gabriela Stoeva (Bulgaria) Stefani Stoeva; 21–16, 21–11	(Russia) Anastasia Chervyakova (Russia) Olga Morozova
May 18	Spanish International; Madrid, Spain; International Challenge $15,000 – 32MS/32WS/24MD/24WD/24XD	(Germany) Marvin Emil Seidel (Germany) Linda Efler; 21–16, 21–12	(England) Gregory Mairs (England) Jenny Moore
May 25	Australian Open; Sydney, Australia; Super Series $750,000 – 32MS/32WS/32MD/32WD/32XD; Draw	(China) Chen Long; 21–12, 14–21, 21–18	(Denmark) Viktor Axelsen
May 25	Australian Open; Sydney, Australia; Super Series $750,000 – 32MS/32WS/32MD/32WD/32XD; Draw	(Spain) Carolina Marín; 22–20, 21–18	(China) Wang Shixian
May 25	Australian Open; Sydney, Australia; Super Series $750,000 – 32MS/32WS/32MD/32WD/32XD; Draw	(South Korea) Lee Yong-dae (South Korea) Yoo Yeon-seong; 21–16, 21–17	(China) Liu Cheng (China) Lu Kai
May 25	Australian Open; Sydney, Australia; Super Series $750,000 – 32MS/32WS/32MD/32WD/32XD; Draw	(China) Ma Jin (China) Tang Yuanting; 21–19, 16–21, 22–20	(China) Tang Jinhua (China) Tian Qing
May 25	Australian Open; Sydney, Australia; Super Series $750,000 – 32MS/32WS/32MD/32WD/32XD; Draw	(Hong Kong) Lee Chun Hei (Hong Kong) Chau Hoi Wah; 21–19, 19–21, 21–15	(China) Liu Cheng (China) Bao Yixin
May 25	Riga International; Riga, Latvia; Future Series; 32MS/32WS/32MD/16WD/32XD	(Russia) Sirant Sergey; 21–16, 22–20	(Slovenia) Iztok Utrosa
May 25	Riga International; Riga, Latvia; Future Series; 32MS/32WS/32MD/16WD/32XD	(Russia) Anastasia Chervyakova; 24–26, 21–14, 21–12	(Lithuania) Akvilė Stapušaitytė
May 25	Riga International; Riga, Latvia; Future Series; 32MS/32WS/32MD/16WD/32XD	(Denmark) Mads Emil Christensen (Denmark) Kristoffer Knudsen; 21–12, 21–13	(France) Thomas Baures (France) Thom Gicquel
May 25	Riga International; Riga, Latvia; Future Series; 32MS/32WS/32MD/16WD/32XD	(Estonia) Kristin Kuuba (Estonia) Helina Rüütel; 20–22, 21–17, 21–12	(France) Vimala Hériau (France) Margot Lambert
May 25	Riga International; Riga, Latvia; Future Series; 32MS/32WS/32MD/16WD/32XD	(Russia) Andrey Parokhodin (Russia) Anastasia Chervyakova; 21–18, 21–17	(Denmark) Mads Emil Christensen (Denmark) Cecilie Sentow

=== June ===
Week of	Tournament	Champions	Runners-up
June 1	Sri Lanka International Challenge; Colombo, Sri Lanka; International Challenge $15,000 – 64MS/32WS/32MD/32WD/32XD	(India) Sai Praneeth B. 21–18, 21–8	(India) Sameer Verma
June 1	Sri Lanka International Challenge; Colombo, Sri Lanka; International Challenge $15,000 – 64MS/32WS/32MD/32WD/32XD	(Thailand) Supanida Katethong; 17–21, 21–11, 12–6 Retired	(Switzerland) Sabrina Jaquet
June 1	Sri Lanka International Challenge; Colombo, Sri Lanka; International Challenge $15,000 – 64MS/32WS/32MD/32WD/32XD	(Malaysia) Koo Kien Keat (Malaysia) Tan Boon Heong; 21–19, 21–17	(Malaysia) Chooi Kah Ming (Malaysia) Ow Yao Han
June 1	Sri Lanka International Challenge; Colombo, Sri Lanka; International Challenge $15,000 – 64MS/32WS/32MD/32WD/32XD	(Thailand) Chaladchalam Chayanit (Thailand) Phataimas Muenwong; 21–17, 14–21, 21–14	(India) Pradnya Gadre (India) N. Siki Reddy
June 1	Sri Lanka International Challenge; Colombo, Sri Lanka; International Challenge $15,000 – 64MS/32WS/32MD/32WD/32XD	(India) Arun Vishnu (India) Aparna Balan; 15–21, 21–17, 21–13	(Australia) Robin Middleton (Australia) Leanne Choo
June 1	Indonesia Open; Jakarta, Indonesia; Super Series Premier $800,000 – 32MS/32WS/32MD/32WD/32XD; Draw	(Japan) Kento Momota; 16–21, 21–19, 21–7	(Denmark) Jan Ø. Jørgensen
June 1	Indonesia Open; Jakarta, Indonesia; Super Series Premier $800,000 – 32MS/32WS/32MD/32WD/32XD; Draw	(Thailand) Ratchanok Intanon; 21–11, 21–10	(Japan) Yui Hashimoto
June 1	Indonesia Open; Jakarta, Indonesia; Super Series Premier $800,000 – 32MS/32WS/32MD/32WD/32XD; Draw	(South Korea) Ko Sung-hyun (South Korea) Shin Baek-cheol; 21–16, 16–21, 21–19	(China) Fu Haifeng (China) Zhang Nan
June 1	Indonesia Open; Jakarta, Indonesia; Super Series Premier $800,000 – 32MS/32WS/32MD/32WD/32XD; Draw	(China) Tang Jinhua (China) Tian Qing; 21–11, 21–10	(Indonesia) Nitya Krishinda Maheswari (Indonesia) Greysia Polii
June 1	Indonesia Open; Jakarta, Indonesia; Super Series Premier $800,000 – 32MS/32WS/32MD/32WD/32XD; Draw	(China) Xu Chen (China) Ma Jin; 21–17, 21–16	(China) Zhang Nan (China) Zhao Yunlei
June 1	Lithuanian International; Kaunas, Lithuania; Future Series; 32MS/32WS/32MD/16WD/32XD	(Czech Republic) Adam Mendrek; 22–20, 6–21, 21–18	(Lithuania) Kęstutis Navickas
June 1	Lithuanian International; Kaunas, Lithuania; Future Series; 32MS/32WS/32MD/16WD/32XD	(Germany) Yvonne Li; 21–14, 21–14	(Belarus) Alesia Zaitsava
June 1	Lithuanian International; Kaunas, Lithuania; Future Series; 32MS/32WS/32MD/16WD/32XD	(Poland) Milosz Bochat (Poland) Pawel Pietryja; 21–17, 21–13	(Lithuania) Povilas Bartusis (Lithuania) Alan Plavin
June 1	Lithuanian International; Kaunas, Lithuania; Future Series; 32MS/32WS/32MD/16WD/32XD	(France) Marie Batomene (France) Teshana Vignes Waran; 21–11, 21–7	(Germany) Luise Heim (Germany) Yvonne Li
June 1	Lithuanian International; Kaunas, Lithuania; Future Series; 32MS/32WS/32MD/16WD/32XD	(Denmark) Soeren Toft Hansen (France) Teshana Vignes Waran; 21–14, 21–17	(Russia) Andrey Parokhodin (Russia) Anastasia Chervyakova
June 1	Santo Domingo Open; Santo Domingo, Dominican Republic; International Series $5,000 – 32MS/32WS/32MD/32WD/32XD	(Austria) David Obernosterer; 21–17, 21–17	(Austria) Luka Wraber
June 1	Santo Domingo Open; Santo Domingo, Dominican Republic; International Series $5,000 – 32MS/32WS/32MD/32WD/32XD	(Austria) Elisabeth Baldauf; 21–18, 12–21, 21–19	(Mexico) Haramara Gaitan
June 1	Santo Domingo Open; Santo Domingo, Dominican Republic; International Series $5,000 – 32MS/32WS/32MD/32WD/32XD	(Mexico) Job Castillo (Mexico) Lino Munoz; 21–18, 24–26, 21–17	(Peru) Mario Cuba (Peru) Martin del Valle
June 1	Santo Domingo Open; Santo Domingo, Dominican Republic; International Series $5,000 – 32MS/32WS/32MD/32WD/32XD	(Peru) Katherine Winder (Peru) Luz Maria Zornoza; 21–15, 21–6	(Dominican Republic) Nairoby Abigail Jimenez (Dominican Republic) Licelott Sanchez
June 1	Santo Domingo Open; Santo Domingo, Dominican Republic; International Series $5,000 – 32MS/32WS/32MD/32WD/32XD	(Austria) David Obernosterer (Austria) Elisabeth Baldauf; 14–21, 21–16, 21–19	(Peru) Mario Cuba (Peru) Katherine Winder
June 8
June 8	European Club Championships; Tours, France; CC Team Championships; 16 teams	(Russia) Primorye; 3–1	(France) AIX Universite CB
June 8	Mauritius International; Beau-Bassin Rose-Hill, Mauritius; International Series $10,000 – 32MS/32WS/32MD/32WD/32XD	(Guatemala) Kevin Cordón; 21–12, 21–18	(Austria) Luka Wraber
June 8	Mauritius International; Beau-Bassin Rose-Hill, Mauritius; International Series $10,000 – 32MS/32WS/32MD/32WD/32XD	(Finland) Nanna Vainio; 21–16, 21–11	(Finland) Airi Mikkela
June 8	Mauritius International; Beau-Bassin Rose-Hill, Mauritius; International Series $10,000 – 32MS/32WS/32MD/32WD/32XD	(India) Shlok Ramchandran (India) Sanyam Shukla; 21–19, 21–12	(South Africa) Andries Malan (South Africa) Willem Viljoen
June 8	Mauritius International; Beau-Bassin Rose-Hill, Mauritius; International Series $10,000 – 32MS/32WS/32MD/32WD/32XD	(Iran) Negin Amiripour (Iran) Sorayya Aghaei; 28–26, 21–14	(Nigeria) Grace Gabriel (Zambia) Ogar Siamupangila
June 8	Mauritius International; Beau-Bassin Rose-Hill, Mauritius; International Series $10,000 – 32MS/32WS/32MD/32WD/32XD	(South Africa) Andries Malan (South Africa) Jennifer Fry; 21–18, 21–16	(Mauritius) Sahir Abdool Edoo (Mauritius) Yeldy Marie Louison
June 15	U.S. Open; New York City, United States; Grand Prix Gold $120,000 – 64MS/32WS/32MD/32WD/32XD; Draw	(Malaysia) Lee Chong Wei; 22–20, 21–12	(Denmark) Hans-Kristian Vittinghus
June 15	U.S. Open; New York City, United States; Grand Prix Gold $120,000 – 64MS/32WS/32MD/32WD/32XD; Draw	(Japan) Nozomi Okuhara; 21–16, 21–14	(Japan) Sayaka Sato
June 15	U.S. Open; New York City, United States; Grand Prix Gold $120,000 – 64MS/32WS/32MD/32WD/32XD; Draw	(China) Li Junhui (China) Liu Yuchen; 21–12, 21–16	(India) Manu Attri (India) B. Sumeeth Reddy
June 15	U.S. Open; New York City, United States; Grand Prix Gold $120,000 – 64MS/32WS/32MD/32WD/32XD; Draw	(China) Yu Yang (China) Zhong Qianxin; 21–14, 21–10	(Japan) Ayane Kurihara (Japan) Naru Shinoya
June 15	U.S. Open; New York City, United States; Grand Prix Gold $120,000 – 64MS/32WS/32MD/32WD/32XD; Draw	(China) Huang Kaixiang (China) Huang Dongping; 21–15, 21–14	(Hong Kong) Lee Chun Hei (Hong Kong) Chau Hoi Wah
June 22	Canada Open; Calgary, Alberta, Canada; Grand Prix $50,000 – 64MS/32WS/32MD/32WD/32XD; Draw	(Malaysia) Lee Chong Wei; 21–17, 21–13	(Hong Kong) Ng Ka Long
June 22	Canada Open; Calgary, Alberta, Canada; Grand Prix $50,000 – 64MS/32WS/32MD/32WD/32XD; Draw	(Canada) Michelle Li; 21–17, 25–23	(Japan) Kaori Imabeppu
June 22	Canada Open; Calgary, Alberta, Canada; Grand Prix $50,000 – 64MS/32WS/32MD/32WD/32XD; Draw	(China) Li Junhui (China) Liu Yuchen; 17–21, 21–12, 21–18	(China) Huang Kaixiang (China) Wang Sijie
June 22	Canada Open; Calgary, Alberta, Canada; Grand Prix $50,000 – 64MS/32WS/32MD/32WD/32XD; Draw	(India) Jwala Gutta (India) Ashwini Ponnappa; 21–19, 21–16	(Netherlands) Eefje Muskens (Netherlands) Selena Piek
June 22	Canada Open; Calgary, Alberta, Canada; Grand Prix $50,000 – 64MS/32WS/32MD/32WD/32XD; Draw	(Hong Kong) Lee Chun Hei (Hong Kong) Chau Hoi Wah; 21–16, 21–18	(Indonesia) Andrei Adistia (Indonesia) Vita Marissa
June 22	European Games; Baku, Azerbaijan; Multi-sport; 32MS/32WS/32MD/32WD/32XD; Draw	(Spain) Pablo Abián; 21–12, 23–21	(Denmark) Emil Holst
June 22	European Games; Baku, Azerbaijan; Multi-sport; 32MS/32WS/32MD/32WD/32XD; Draw	(Denmark) Line Kjaersfeldt; 18–21, 21–19, 21–9	(Belgium) Lianne Tan
June 22	European Games; Baku, Azerbaijan; Multi-sport; 32MS/32WS/32MD/32WD/32XD; Draw	(Denmark) Mathias Boe (Denmark) Carsten Mogensen; 21–8, 21–13	(Russia) Vladimir Ivanov (Russia) Ivan Sozonov
June 22	European Games; Baku, Azerbaijan; Multi-sport; 32MS/32WS/32MD/32WD/32XD; Draw	(Bulgaria) Gabriela Stoeva (Bulgaria) Stefani Stoeva; 21–12, 23–21	(Russia) Ekaterina Bolotova (Russia) Evgeniya Kosetskaya
June 22	European Games; Baku, Azerbaijan; Multi-sport; 32MS/32WS/32MD/32WD/32XD; Draw	(Denmark) Niclas Nøhr (Denmark) Sara Thygesen; 21–16, 21–16	(France) Gaetan Mittelheisser (France) Audrey Fontaine
June 29	Island Games; Channel Islands, Jersey; Multi-sport	Jersey; 3–2	Faroe Islands
June 29	Island Games; Channel Islands, Jersey; Multi-sport	(Jersey) Mark Constable; 21–9, 21–12	(Faroe Islands) Niclas H. Eysturoy
June 29	Island Games; Channel Islands, Jersey; Multi-sport	(Faroe Islands) Rannvá Djurhuus Carlsson; 21–11, 21–15	(Isle of Man) Cristen Marritt
June 29	Island Games; Channel Islands, Jersey; Multi-sport	(Greenland) Bror Madsen (Greenland) Jens Frederik Nielsen; 21–17, 24–22	(Menorca) Albert Navarro Comes (Menorca) Eric Navarro Comes
June 29	Island Games; Channel Islands, Jersey; Multi-sport	(Isle of Man) Kimberley Clague (Isle of Man) Cristen Marritt; 21–14, 21–10	(Gotland) Caroline Gate (Gotland) Viktoria Olsson Meimermondt
June 29	Island Games; Channel Islands, Jersey; Multi-sport	(Gotland) Björn Eriksson (Gotland) Caroline Gate; 21–17, 21–19	(Shetland) Gordon Keith (Shetland) Shona Mackay
June 29	White Nights; Gatchina, Russia; International Challenge $15,000 – 32MS/32WS/32MD/32WD/32XD	(Russia) Vladimir Malkov; 21–16, 21–12	(Vietnam) Nguyễn Tiến Minh
June 29	White Nights; Gatchina, Russia; International Challenge $15,000 – 32MS/32WS/32MD/32WD/32XD	(Vietnam) Vu Thi Trang; 21–14, 21–14	(United States) Rong Schafer
June 29	White Nights; Gatchina, Russia; International Challenge $15,000 – 32MS/32WS/32MD/32WD/32XD	(Malaysia) Koo Kien Keat (Malaysia) Tan Boon Heong; 21–10, 21–12	(England) Marcus Ellis (England) Chris Langridge
June 29	White Nights; Gatchina, Russia; International Challenge $15,000 – 32MS/32WS/32MD/32WD/32XD	(Russia) Ekaterina Bolotova (Russia) Evgeniya Kosetskaya; 20–22, 21–13, 21–15	(Turkey) Özge Bayrak (Turkey) Neslihan Yiğit
June 29	White Nights; Gatchina, Russia; International Challenge $15,000 – 32MS/32WS/32MD/32WD/32XD	(Republic of Ireland) Sam Magee (Republic of Ireland) Chloe Magee; 21–18, 21–17	(Poland) Robert Mateusiak (Poland) Nadieżda Zięba

=== July ===
Week of	Tournament	Champions	Runners-up
July 6	Summer Universiade; Gwangju, South Korea; FISU; 16XT/32MS/32WS/32MD/32WD/32XD; Draw	South Korea; 3–0	China
July 6	Summer Universiade; Gwangju, South Korea; FISU; 16XT/32MS/32WS/32MD/32WD/32XD; Draw	(South Korea) Jeon Hyeok-jin; 22–20, 13–21, 21–17	(South Korea) Son Wan-ho
July 6	Summer Universiade; Gwangju, South Korea; FISU; 16XT/32MS/32WS/32MD/32WD/32XD; Draw	(South Korea) Sung Ji-hyun; 21–18, 21–19	(Thailand) Porntip Buranaprasertsuk
July 6	Summer Universiade; Gwangju, South Korea; FISU; 16XT/32MS/32WS/32MD/32WD/32XD; Draw	(South Korea) Kim Ki-jung (South Korea) Kim Sa-rang; 21–16. 22–20	(China) Wang Yilu (China) Zhang Wen
July 6	Summer Universiade; Gwangju, South Korea; FISU; 16XT/32MS/32WS/32MD/32WD/32XD; Draw	(South Korea) Lee So-hee (South Korea) Shin Seung-chan; 21–16, 21–13	(China) Ou Dongni (China) Yu Xiaohan
July 6	Summer Universiade; Gwangju, South Korea; FISU; 16XT/32MS/32WS/32MD/32WD/32XD; Draw	(South Korea) Kim Ki-jung (South Korea) Shin Seung-chan; 21–14, 21–11	(Chinese Taipei) Chiang Kai-hsin (Chinese Taipei) Lu Ching-yao
July 6	Kazakhstan International; Oral, Kazakhstan; International Series $5,000 – 64MS/64WS/32MD/32WD/32XD	(Russia) Vladimir Malkov; 21–18, 21–16	(Russia) Anatoliy Yartsev
July 6	Kazakhstan International; Oral, Kazakhstan; International Series $5,000 – 64MS/64WS/32MD/32WD/32XD	(Russia) Evgeniya Kosetskaya; 21–17, 21–10	(Belgium) Lianne Tan
July 6	Kazakhstan International; Oral, Kazakhstan; International Series $5,000 – 64MS/64WS/32MD/32WD/32XD	(Malaysia) Lim Ming Chuen (Malaysia) Ong Wei Khoon; 21–18, 18–21, 21–18	(Russia) Gordey Kosenko (Russia) Vadim Novoselov
July 6	Kazakhstan International; Oral, Kazakhstan; International Series $5,000 – 64MS/64WS/32MD/32WD/32XD	(Russia) Tatjana Bibik (Russia) Ksenia Polikarpova; 21–14, 21–12	(Iran) Negin Amiripour (Iran) Sorayya Aghaei
July 6	Kazakhstan International; Oral, Kazakhstan; International Series $5,000 – 64MS/64WS/32MD/32WD/32XD	(Russia) Anatoliy Yartsev (Russia) Evgeniya Kosetskaya; 21–11, 21–12	(Malaysia) Bolriffin Khairul Tor (Malaysia) Ng Sin Er
July 13
July 13	Pan American Games; Toronto, Ontario, Canada; Multisports; 32MS/32WS/32MD/32WD/32XD; Draw	(Guatemala) Kevin Cordón; 21–13, 21–14	(Canada) Andrew D’Souza
July 13	Pan American Games; Toronto, Ontario, Canada; Multisports; 32MS/32WS/32MD/32WD/32XD; Draw	(Canada) Michelle Li; 21–15, 21–9	(Canada) Rachel Honderich
July 13	Pan American Games; Toronto, Ontario, Canada; Multisports; 32MS/32WS/32MD/32WD/32XD; Draw	(United States) Phillip Chew (United States) Sattawat Pongnairat; 21–18, 21–16	(Brazil) Hugo Arthuso (Brazil) Daniel Paiola
July 13	Pan American Games; Toronto, Ontario, Canada; Multisports; 32MS/32WS/32MD/32WD/32XD; Draw	(United States) Eva Lee (United States) Paula Lynn Obanana; 21–14, 21–6	(Brazil) Lohaynny Vicente (Brazil) Luana Vicente
July 13	Pan American Games; Toronto, Ontario, Canada; Multisports; 32MS/32WS/32MD/32WD/32XD; Draw	(United States) Phillip Chew (United States) Jamie Subandhi; 21–9, 21–23, 21–12	(Canada) Toby Ng (Canada) Alexandra Bruce
July 13	Chinese Taipei Open; Taipei, Chinese Taipei; Grand Prix Gold $200,000 – 64MS/32WS/32MD/32WD/32XD; Draw	(China) Chen Long; 15–21, 21–9, 21–6	(Chinese Taipei) Chou Tien-chen
July 13	Chinese Taipei Open; Taipei, Chinese Taipei; Grand Prix Gold $200,000 – 64MS/32WS/32MD/32WD/32XD; Draw	(China) Wang Yihan; 21–10, 21–9	(China) Li Xuerui
July 13	Chinese Taipei Open; Taipei, Chinese Taipei; Grand Prix Gold $200,000 – 64MS/32WS/32MD/32WD/32XD; Draw	(China) Fu Haifeng (China) Zhang Nan; 21–13, 21–8	(Indonesia) Markus Fernaldi Gideon (Indonesia) Kevin Sanjaya Sukamuljo
July 13	Chinese Taipei Open; Taipei, Chinese Taipei; Grand Prix Gold $200,000 – 64MS/32WS/32MD/32WD/32XD; Draw	(Indonesia) Nitya Krishinda Maheswari (Indonesia) Greysia Polii; 21–17, 21–17	(China) Luo Ying (China) Luo Yu
July 13	Chinese Taipei Open; Taipei, Chinese Taipei; Grand Prix Gold $200,000 – 64MS/32WS/32MD/32WD/32XD; Draw	(South Korea) Ko Sung-hyun (South Korea) Kim Ha-na; 21–16, 21–18	(South Korea) Shin Baek-cheol (South Korea) Chae Yoo-jung
July 13	Lagos International; Lagos, Nigeria; International Challenge $15,000 – 32MS/32WS/32MD/16WD/32XD	(India) Sai Praneeth B. 21–14, 21–11	(Poland) Adrian Dziolko
July 13	Lagos International; Lagos, Nigeria; International Challenge $15,000 – 32MS/32WS/32MD/16WD/32XD	(Czech Republic) Kristína Gavnholt; 24–22, 18–21, 21–5	(Turkey) Özge Bayrak
July 13	Lagos International; Lagos, Nigeria; International Challenge $15,000 – 32MS/32WS/32MD/16WD/32XD	(India) Manu Attri (India) B. Sumeeth Reddy; 21–17, 21–17	(Poland) Adam Cwalina (Poland) Przemysław Wacha
July 13	Lagos International; Lagos, Nigeria; International Challenge $15,000 – 32MS/32WS/32MD/16WD/32XD	(India) Pradnya Gadre (India) N. Sikki Reddy; 21–19, 21–23, 21–15	(Turkey) Özge Bayrak (Turkey) Neslihan Yiğit
July 13	Lagos International; Lagos, Nigeria; International Challenge $15,000 – 32MS/32WS/32MD/16WD/32XD	(Poland) Robert Mateusiak (Poland) Nadieżda Zięba; 21–19, 21–7	(India) Tarun Kona (India) N. Sikki Reddy
July 20	Russian Open; Vladivostok, Russia; Grand Prix $50,000 – 64MS/32WS/16MD/16WD/32XD; Draw	(Indonesia) Tommy Sugiarto; 21–16, 21–10	(Estonia) Raul Must
July 20	Russian Open; Vladivostok, Russia; Grand Prix $50,000 – 64MS/32WS/16MD/16WD/32XD; Draw	(Czech Republic) Kristína Gavnholt; 21–10, 22–20	(Japan) Mayu Matsumoto
July 20	Russian Open; Vladivostok, Russia; Grand Prix $50,000 – 64MS/32WS/16MD/16WD/32XD; Draw	(Russia) Vladimir Ivanov (Russia) Ivan Sozonov; 22–20, 21–19	(Malaysia) Goh V Shem (Malaysia) Tan Wee Kiong
July 20	Russian Open; Vladivostok, Russia; Grand Prix $50,000 – 64MS/32WS/16MD/16WD/32XD; Draw	(Bulgaria) Gabriela Stoeva (Bulgaria) Stefani Stoeva; 21–15, 21–17	(Germany) Johanna Goliszewski (Germany) Carla Nelte
July 20	Russian Open; Vladivostok, Russia; Grand Prix $50,000 – 64MS/32WS/16MD/16WD/32XD; Draw	(Malaysia) Chan Peng Soon (Malaysia) Goh Liu Ying; 21–13, 23–21	(Japan) Yuta Watanabe (Japan) Arisa Higashino

=== August ===
Week of	Tournament	Champions	Runners-up
August 10	World Championships; Jakarta, Indonesia; BWF Major Event; 64MS/64WS/48MD/48WD/48XD; Draw	(China) Chen Long; 21–14, 21–17	(Malaysia) Lee Chong Wei
August 10	World Championships; Jakarta, Indonesia; BWF Major Event; 64MS/64WS/48MD/48WD/48XD; Draw	(Spain) Carolina Marín; 21–16, 21–19	(India) Saina Nehwal
August 10	World Championships; Jakarta, Indonesia; BWF Major Event; 64MS/64WS/48MD/48WD/48XD; Draw	(Indonesia) Mohammad Ahsan (Indonesia) Hendra Setiawan; 21–17, 21–11	(China) Liu Xiaolong (China) Qiu Zihan
August 10	World Championships; Jakarta, Indonesia; BWF Major Event; 64MS/64WS/48MD/48WD/48XD; Draw	(China) Tian Qing (China) Zhao Yunlei; 23–25, 21–8, 21–15	(Denmark) Christinna Pedersen (Denmark) Kamilla Rytter Juhl
August 10	World Championships; Jakarta, Indonesia; BWF Major Event; 64MS/64WS/48MD/48WD/48XD; Draw	(China) Zhang Nan (China) Zhao Yunlei; 21–17, 21–11	(China) Liu Cheng (China) Bao Yixin
August 17	Eurasia Bulgaria International; Sofia, Bulgaria; International Series $5,000 – 32MS/32WS/32MD/32WD/32XD	(Estonia) Raul Must; 21–15, 22–20	(France) Lucas Claerbout
August 17	Eurasia Bulgaria International; Sofia, Bulgaria; International Series $5,000 – 32MS/32WS/32MD/32WD/32XD	(Denmark) Natalia Koch Rohde; 21–15, 21–19	(Germany) Yvonne Li
August 17	Eurasia Bulgaria International; Sofia, Bulgaria; International Series $5,000 – 32MS/32WS/32MD/32WD/32XD	(France) Jordan Corvee (France) Julien Maio; 18–21, 25–23, 21–17	(Bulgaria) Daniel Nikolov (Bulgaria) Ivan Rusev
August 17	Eurasia Bulgaria International; Sofia, Bulgaria; International Series $5,000 – 32MS/32WS/32MD/32WD/32XD	(Vietnam) Le Thu Huyen (Vietnam) Pham Nhu Thao; 21–16, 21–9	(France) Marie Batomene (France) Anne Tran
August 17	Eurasia Bulgaria International; Sofia, Bulgaria; International Series $5,000 – 32MS/32WS/32MD/32WD/32XD	(Vietnam) Do Tuan Duc (Vietnam) Pham Nhu Thao; Walkover	(Denmark) Alexander Bond (Denmark) Ditte Soby Hansen
August 17	Singapore International; Singapore; International Series $5,000 – 64MS/32WS/32MD/32WD/32XD	(Malaysia) Iskandar Zulkarnain Zainuddin; 21–11, 21–15	(Malaysia) Soo Teck Zhi
August 17	Singapore International; Singapore; International Series $5,000 – 64MS/32WS/32MD/32WD/32XD	(Indonesia) Gregoria Mariska Tunjung; 22–20, 21–15	(Singapore) Yeo Jia Min
August 17	Singapore International; Singapore; International Series $5,000 – 64MS/32WS/32MD/32WD/32XD	(Singapore) Terry Hee Yong Kai (Singapore) Loh Kean Hean; 13–21, 21–16, 21–19	(Indonesia) Hardianto (Indonesia) Kenas Adi Haryanto
August 17	Singapore International; Singapore; International Series $5,000 – 64MS/32WS/32MD/32WD/32XD	(Indonesia) Apriani (Indonesia) Jauza Fadhila Sugiarto; 22–20, 16–21, 21–10	(Indonesia) Melvira Oklamona (Indonesia) Rika Rositawati
August 17	Singapore International; Singapore; International Series $5,000 – 64MS/32WS/32MD/32WD/32XD	(Indonesia) Hafiz Faisal (Indonesia) Shella Devi Aulia; 21–14, 21–17	(Thailand) Tinn Isriyanate (Thailand) Savitree Amitrapai
August 17	Turkey International; Istanbul, Turkey; International Series $5,000 – 32MS/32WS/32MD/32WD/32XD	(Belgium) Yuhan Tan; 12–21, 21–13, 21–18	(Israel) Misha Zilberman
August 17	Turkey International; Istanbul, Turkey; International Series $5,000 – 32MS/32WS/32MD/32WD/32XD	(Estonia) Kati Tolmoff; 21–13, 21–11	(Hungary) Laura Sarosi
August 17	Turkey International; Istanbul, Turkey; International Series $5,000 – 32MS/32WS/32MD/32WD/32XD	(Hungary) Gergely Krausz (Thailand) Tovannakasem Samatcha; 21–6, 21–6	(Iran) Ashkan Fesahati (Iran) Mohamad Reza Khanjani
August 17	Turkey International; Istanbul, Turkey; International Series $5,000 – 32MS/32WS/32MD/32WD/32XD	(Turkey) Kader İnal (Turkey) Fatma Nur Yavuz; 21–13, 21–15	(Turkey) Cemre Fere (Turkey) Ebru Yazgan
August 17	Turkey International; Istanbul, Turkey; International Series $5,000 – 32MS/32WS/32MD/32WD/32XD	(Turkey) Melih Turgut (Turkey) Fatma Nur Yavuz; 21–14, 20–22, 21–11	(Turkey) Serdar Koca (Turkey) Emine Demirtas
August 24	Vietnam Open; Ho Chi Minh City, Vietnam; Grand Prix $50,000 – 64MS/32WS/32MD/32WD/32XD; Draw	(Indonesia) Tommy Sugiarto; 21–19, 21–19	(South Korea) Lee Hyun-il
August 24	Vietnam Open; Ho Chi Minh City, Vietnam; Grand Prix $50,000 – 64MS/32WS/32MD/32WD/32XD; Draw	(Japan) Saena Kawakami; 26–24, 18–21, 21–10	(Indonesia) Fitriani
August 24	Vietnam Open; Ho Chi Minh City, Vietnam; Grand Prix $50,000 – 64MS/32WS/32MD/32WD/32XD; Draw	(China) Li Junhui (China) Liu Yuchen; 21–8, 21–16	(China) Huang Kaixiang (China) Wang Sijie
August 24	Vietnam Open; Ho Chi Minh City, Vietnam; Grand Prix $50,000 – 64MS/32WS/32MD/32WD/32XD; Draw	(Thailand) Jongkongphan Kittiharakul (Thailand) Rawinda Prajongjai; 21–14, 21–12	(Indonesia) Suci Rizky Andini (Indonesia) Maretha Dea Giovani
August 24	Vietnam Open; Ho Chi Minh City, Vietnam; Grand Prix $50,000 – 64MS/32WS/32MD/32WD/32XD; Draw	(China) Huang Kaixiang (China) Huang Dongping; 21–19, 21–12	(South Korea) Choi Sol-gyu (South Korea) Chae Yoo-jung
August 24	Carebaco International; Santo Domingo, Dominican Republic; Future Series; 32MS/16WS/16MD/8WD/16XD	(Jamaica) Gareth Henry; 21–8, 21–6	(Dominican Republic) William Cabrera
August 24	Carebaco International; Santo Domingo, Dominican Republic; Future Series; 32MS/16WS/16MD/8WD/16XD	(Trinidad and Tobago) Solangel Guzman; 21-9, 21-11	(Dominican Republic) Daigenis Saturria
August 24	Carebaco International; Santo Domingo, Dominican Republic; Future Series; 32MS/16WS/16MD/8WD/16XD	(Jamaica) Gareth Henry (Jamaica) Dayvon Reid; 21-16, 20–22, 21-18	(Jamaica) Dennis Coke (Jamaica) Anthony Mcnee
August 24	Carebaco International; Santo Domingo, Dominican Republic; Future Series; 32MS/16WS/16MD/8WD/16XD	(Dominican Republic) Daigenis Mercedes Saturria (Dominican Republic) Licelott Sanchez; 21–10, 21–13	(Trinidad and Tobago) Leanna Castanada (Trinidad and Tobago) Avril Plaza Marcelle
August 24	Carebaco International; Santo Domingo, Dominican Republic; Future Series; 32MS/16WS/16MD/8WD/16XD	(Dominican Republic) Nelson Javier (Dominican Republic) Daigenis Saturria; 21–17, 21–19	(Jamaica) Gareth Henry (Jamaica) Katherine Wynter
August 24	Slovak Open; Trenčín, Slovakia; Future Series; 32MS/32WS/24MD/24WD/24XD	(England) Alex Lane; 21–15, 21–9	(Finland) Henri Aarnio
August 24	Slovak Open; Trenčín, Slovakia; Future Series; 32MS/32WS/24MD/24WD/24XD	(Czech Republic) Kristína Gavnholt; 21–10, 21–15	(Netherlands) Gayle Mahulette
August 24	Slovak Open; Trenčín, Slovakia; Future Series; 32MS/32WS/24MD/24WD/24XD	(Vietnam) Do Tuan Duc (Vietnam) Nguyen Ngoc Manh; 21–14, 21–18	(England) Darren Adamson (England) Scott Sankey
August 24	Slovak Open; Trenčín, Slovakia; Future Series; 32MS/32WS/24MD/24WD/24XD	(Netherlands) Gayle Mahulette (Netherlands) Cheryl Seinen; 21–13, 21–16	(Slovenia) Nika Arih (Slovenia) Petra Polanc
August 24	Slovak Open; Trenčín, Slovakia; Future Series; 32MS/32WS/24MD/24WD/24XD	(England) Ben Lane (England) Jessica Pugh; 18–21, 21–13, 21–12	(Vietnam) Do Tuan Duc (Vietnam) Pham Nhu Thao
August 31	European University Championships; Warsaw, Poland; Multi-sports events (University); 16XT/32MS/32WS/32MD/32WD/32XD	(Turkey) Uludag University; 3–1	(France) University of Bordeaux
August 31	European University Championships; Warsaw, Poland; Multi-sports events (University); 16XT/32MS/32WS/32MD/32WD/32XD	(Poland) Mateusz Dubowski; Opole University	(Turkey) Sinan Zorlu; University of Opole
August 31	European University Championships; Warsaw, Poland; Multi-sports events (University); 16XT/32MS/32WS/32MD/32WD/32XD	(Turkey) Özge Bayrak; Uludağ University	(Turkey) Neslihan Yiğit; Uludağ University
August 31	European University Championships; Warsaw, Poland; Multi-sports events (University); 16XT/32MS/32WS/32MD/32WD/32XD	(Poland) Mateusz Dubowski (Poland) Paweł Pietryja; Opole University	(France) Grégor Dunikowski (France) Thomas Vallez; University of Bordeaux
August 31	European University Championships; Warsaw, Poland; Multi-sports events (University); 16XT/32MS/32WS/32MD/32WD/32XD	(Turkey) Özge Bayrak (Turkey) Neslihan Yiğit; Uludag University	(France) Delphine Delrue (France) Lauranne Rosello; University of Bordeaux
August 31	European University Championships; Warsaw, Poland; Multi-sports events (University); 16XT/32MS/32WS/32MD/32WD/32XD	(Poland) Paweł Pietryja (Poland) Aneta Wojtkowska; Opole University	(France) Thomas Vallez (France) Delphine Delrue; University of Bordeaux
August 31	Indonesia International; Surabaya, Indonesia; International Challenge $20,000 – 64MS/32WS/32MD/32WD/32XD	(Indonesia) Sony Dwi Kuncoro; 22–20, 21–15	(South Korea) Jeon Hyeok-jin
August 31	Indonesia International; Surabaya, Indonesia; International Challenge $20,000 – 64MS/32WS/32MD/32WD/32XD	(Indonesia) Gregoria Mariska Tunjung; 21–15, 15–21, 21–7	(Malaysia) Tee Jing Yi
August 31	Indonesia International; Surabaya, Indonesia; International Challenge $20,000 – 64MS/32WS/32MD/32WD/32XD	(Indonesia) Berry Angriawan (Indonesia) Rian Agung Saputro; 12–21, 21–19, 21–15	(South Korea) Chan Jun-bong (South Korea) Kim Dae-eun
August 31	Indonesia International; Surabaya, Indonesia; International Challenge $20,000 – 64MS/32WS/32MD/32WD/32XD	(Indonesia) Gebby Ristiyani Imawan (Indonesia) Tiara Rosalia Nuraidah; 21–17, 21–14	(Indonesia) Suci Rizky Andini (Indonesia) Maretha Dea Giovani
August 31	Indonesia International; Surabaya, Indonesia; International Challenge $20,000 – 64MS/32WS/32MD/32WD/32XD	(Indonesia) Fran Kurniawan (Indonesia) Komala Dewi; 21–12, 16–21, 21–13	(South Korea) Chung Eui-seok (South Korea) Kong Hee-yong
August 31	All-Africa Games (Team); Brazzaville, Congo; Multi-sport	Mauritius; 3–2	South Africa
August 31	Guatemala International; Guatemala City, Guatemala; International Series $5,000 – 32MS/32WS/32MD/32WD/32XD	(Guatemala) Kevin Cordón; 22–20, 21–11	(Brazil) Ygor Coelho de Oliveira
August 31	Guatemala International; Guatemala City, Guatemala; International Series $5,000 – 32MS/32WS/32MD/32WD/32XD	(United States) Rong Schafer; 12–21, 21–11, 21–10	(Portugal) Telma Santos
August 31	Guatemala International; Guatemala City, Guatemala; International Series $5,000 – 32MS/32WS/32MD/32WD/32XD	(Germany) Michael Fuchs (Germany) Johannes Schöttler; 21–17, 21–13	(India) Manu Attri (India) B. Sumeeth Reddy
August 31	Guatemala International; Guatemala City, Guatemala; International Series $5,000 – 32MS/32WS/32MD/32WD/32XD	(Germany) Johanna Goliszewski (Germany) Carla Nelte; 21–18, 24–22	(United States) Eva Lee (United States) Paula Lynn Obanana
August 31	Guatemala International; Guatemala City, Guatemala; International Series $5,000 – 32MS/32WS/32MD/32WD/32XD	(Germany) Michael Fuchs (Germany) Birgit Michels; 21–15, 21–16	(France) Ronan Labar (France) Emilie Lefel
August 31	Kharkiv International; Kharkiv, Ukraine; International Challenge $15,000 – 32MS/32WS/32MD/32WD/32XD	(Sweden) Henri Hurskainen; 21–9, 21–15	(England) Rhys Walker
August 31	Kharkiv International; Kharkiv, Ukraine; International Challenge $15,000 – 32MS/32WS/32MD/32WD/32XD	(Germany) Olga Konon; 21–16, 21–10	(Thailand) Pornpawee Chochuwong
August 31	Kharkiv International; Kharkiv, Ukraine; International Challenge $15,000 – 32MS/32WS/32MD/32WD/32XD	(Thailand) Bodin Issara (Thailand) Nipitphon Puangpuapech; 21–18, 21–13	(Poland) Adam Cwalina (Poland) Przemysław Wacha
August 31	Kharkiv International; Kharkiv, Ukraine; International Challenge $15,000 – 32MS/32WS/32MD/32WD/32XD	(Thailand) Jongkongphan Kittiharakul (Thailand) Rawinda Prajongjai; 21–18, 21–15	(England) Heather Olver (England) Lauren Smith
August 31	Kharkiv International; Kharkiv, Ukraine; International Challenge $15,000 – 32MS/32WS/32MD/32WD/32XD	(Poland) Robert Mateusiak (Poland) Nadieżda Zięba; 21–14, 21–14	(France) Gaetan Mittelheisser (France) Audrey Fontaine

=== September ===
Week of	Tournament	Champions	Runners-up
September 7
September 7	All-Africa Games (Individual); Brazzaville, Congo; Multi-sport	(South Africa) Jacob Maliekal; 21–17, 21–17	(South Africa) Prakash Vijayanath
September 7	All-Africa Games (Individual); Brazzaville, Congo; Multi-sport	(Mauritius) Kate Foo Kune; 21–16, 21–19	(Nigeria) Grace Gabriel
September 7	All-Africa Games (Individual); Brazzaville, Congo; Multi-sport	(South Africa) Andries Malan (South Africa) Willem Viljoen; 21–10, 21–13	(Egypt) Ali Ahmed El Khateeb (Egypt) Abdelrahman Kashkal
September 7	All-Africa Games (Individual); Brazzaville, Congo; Multi-sport	(Seychelles) Juliette Ah-Wan (Seychelles) Allisen Camille; 22–20, 18–21, 21–14	(Mauritius) Yeldy Louison (Mauritius) Kate Foo Kune
September 7	All-Africa Games (Individual); Brazzaville, Congo; Multi-sport	(South Africa) Andries Malan (South Africa) Jennifer Fry; 21–17, 23–21	(South Africa) Willem Viljoen (South Africa) Michelle Butler-Emmett
September 7	Japan Open; Tokyo, Japan; Super Series $250,000 – 32MS/32WS/32MD/32WD/32XD; Draw	(China) Lin Dan; 21–19, 16–21, 21–19	(Denmark) Viktor Axelsen
September 7	Japan Open; Tokyo, Japan; Super Series $250,000 – 32MS/32WS/32MD/32WD/32XD; Draw	(Japan) Nozomi Okuhara; 21–18, 21–12	(Japan) Akane Yamaguchi
September 7	Japan Open; Tokyo, Japan; Super Series $250,000 – 32MS/32WS/32MD/32WD/32XD; Draw	(South Korea) Lee Yong-dae (South Korea) Yoo Yeon-seong; 21–19, 29–27	(China) Fu Haifeng (China) Zhang Nan
September 7	Japan Open; Tokyo, Japan; Super Series $250,000 – 32MS/32WS/32MD/32WD/32XD; Draw	(China) Zhao Yunlei (China) Zhong Qianxin; 21–12, 21–16	(Denmark) Christinna Pedersen (Denmark) Kamilla Rytter Juhl
September 7	Japan Open; Tokyo, Japan; Super Series $250,000 – 32MS/32WS/32MD/32WD/32XD; Draw	(Denmark) Joachim Fischer Nielsen (Denmark) Christinna Pedersen; 17–21, 21–18, 23–21	(China) Zhang Nan (China) Zhao Yunlei
September 7	Belgian International; Leuven, Belgium; International Challenge $15,000 – 32MS/32WS/24MD/24WD/24XD	(Denmark) Anders Antonsen; 21–18, 21–17	(Denmark) Christian Lind Thomsen
September 7	Belgian International; Leuven, Belgium; International Challenge $15,000 – 32MS/32WS/24MD/24WD/24XD	(Malaysia) Goh Jin Wei; 21–15, 21–18	(Scotland) Kirsty Gilmour
September 7	Belgian International; Leuven, Belgium; International Challenge $15,000 – 32MS/32WS/24MD/24WD/24XD	(India) Manu Attri (India) B. Sumeeth Reddy; 22–20, 19–21, 22–20	(Poland) Adam Cwalina (Poland) Przemysław Wacha
September 7	Belgian International; Leuven, Belgium; International Challenge $15,000 – 32MS/32WS/24MD/24WD/24XD	(Denmark) Maiken Fruergaard (Denmark) Sara Thygesen; 21–18, 21–11	(Malaysia) Joyce Choong Wai Chi (Malaysia) Yap Cheng Wen
September 7	Belgian International; Leuven, Belgium; International Challenge $15,000 – 32MS/32WS/24MD/24WD/24XD	(Poland) Robert Mateusiak (Poland) Nadieżda Zięba; 15–21, 21–6, 21–8	(Sweden) Jonathan Nordh (Sweden) Emelie Fabbeke
September 7	Internacional Mexicano; Cancún, Mexico; International Series $5,000 – 32MS/32WS/32MD/32WD/32XD	(Spain) Ernesto Velazquez; 21–13, 21–14	(Cuba) Osleni Guerrero
September 7	Internacional Mexicano; Cancún, Mexico; International Series $5,000 – 32MS/32WS/32MD/32WD/32XD	(Portugal) Telma Santos; 21–15, 21–19	(Finland) Airi Mikkela
September 7	Internacional Mexicano; Cancún, Mexico; International Series $5,000 – 32MS/32WS/32MD/32WD/32XD	(Mexico) Job Castillo (Mexico) Lino Munoz; 13–21, 21–12, 22–20	(Brazil) Hugo Arthuso (Brazil) Daniel Paiola
September 7	Internacional Mexicano; Cancún, Mexico; International Series $5,000 – 32MS/32WS/32MD/32WD/32XD	(Brazil) Lohaynny Vicente (Brazil) Luana Vicente; 21–8, 21–17	(Mexico) Cynthia González (Mexico) Mariana Ugalde
September 7	Internacional Mexicano; Cancún, Mexico; International Series $5,000 – 32MS/32WS/32MD/32WD/32XD	(Austria) David Obernosterer (Austria) Elisabeth Baldauf; 21–17, 21–17	(Brazil) Alex Yuwan Tjong (Brazil) Luana Vicente
September 7	Auckland International; Auckland, New Zealand; International Series $5,000 – 64MS/32WS/32MD/32WD/32XD	(Chinese Taipei) Lu Chia-hung; 21–12, 21–14	(Chinese Taipei) Huang Yu-yu
September 7	Auckland International; Auckland, New Zealand; International Series $5,000 – 64MS/32WS/32MD/32WD/32XD	(Chinese Taipei) Lee Chia-hsin; 21–14, 21–17	(Chinese Taipei) Sung Shuo-yun
September 7	Auckland International; Auckland, New Zealand; International Series $5,000 – 64MS/32WS/32MD/32WD/32XD	(Malaysia) Darren Isaac Devadass (Malaysia) Vountus Indra Mawan; 21–7, 21–12	(Chinese Taipei) Po Li-wei (Chinese Taipei) Yang Ming-tse
September 7	Auckland International; Auckland, New Zealand; International Series $5,000 – 64MS/32WS/32MD/32WD/32XD	(Australia) Setyana Mapasa (Australia) Gronya Somerville; 21–9, 21–5	(Chinese Taipei) Pan Tzu-chin (Chinese Taipei) Tsai Hsin-yu
September 7	Auckland International; Auckland, New Zealand; International Series $5,000 – 64MS/32WS/32MD/32WD/32XD	(Chinese Taipei) Lee Chia-han (Chinese Taipei) Lee Chia-hsin; 21–8, 21–15	(Chinese Taipei) Wu Yuan-cheng (Chinese Taipei) Chang Hsin-tien
September 14	Korea Open; Seoul, South Korea; Super Series $600,000 – 32MS/32WS/32MD/32WD/32XD; Draw	(China) Chen Long; 21–14, 21–13	(India) Ajay Jayaram
September 14	Korea Open; Seoul, South Korea; Super Series $600,000 – 32MS/32WS/32MD/32WD/32XD; Draw	(South Korea) Sung Ji-hyun; 21–14, 17–21, 21–18	(China) Wang Yihan
September 14	Korea Open; Seoul, South Korea; Super Series $600,000 – 32MS/32WS/32MD/32WD/32XD; Draw	(South Korea) Lee Yong-dae (South Korea) Yoo Yeon-seong; 21–16, 21–12	(South Korea) Kim Ki-jung (South Korea) Kim Sa-rang
September 14	Korea Open; Seoul, South Korea; Super Series $600,000 – 32MS/32WS/32MD/32WD/32XD; Draw	(Indonesia) Nitya Krishinda Maheswari (Indonesia) Greysia Polii; 21–15, 21–18	(South Korea) Chang Ye-na (South Korea) Lee So-hee
September 14	Korea Open; Seoul, South Korea; Super Series $600,000 – 32MS/32WS/32MD/32WD/32XD; Draw	(China) Zhang Nan (China) Zhao Yunlei; 21–16, 21–15	(Indonesia) Tontowi Ahmad (Indonesia) Lilyana Natsir
September 14	Maribyrnong International; Melbourne, Australia; International Series $5,000 – 64MS/32WS/32MD/32WD/32XD	(Chinese Taipei) Lu Chia-hung; 21–15, 21–18	(Spain) Ernesto Velazquez
September 14	Maribyrnong International; Melbourne, Australia; International Series $5,000 – 64MS/32WS/32MD/32WD/32XD	(Malaysia) Julia Wong Pei Xian; 20–22, 21–19, 21–14	(Australia) Wendy Chen Hsuan-yu
September 14	Maribyrnong International; Melbourne, Australia; International Series $5,000 – 64MS/32WS/32MD/32WD/32XD	(Malaysia) Darren Isaac Devadass (Malaysia) Vountus Indra Mawan; 22–24, 21–10, 21–14	(Australia) Matthew Chau (Australia) Sawan Serasinghe
September 14	Maribyrnong International; Melbourne, Australia; International Series $5,000 – 64MS/32WS/32MD/32WD/32XD	(Australia) Setyana Mapasa (Australia) Gronya Somerville; 20–22, 21–17, 21–18	(Australia) Wendy Chen Hsuan-yu (Chinese Taipei) Lin Shu-yu
September 14	Maribyrnong International; Melbourne, Australia; International Series $5,000 – 64MS/32WS/32MD/32WD/32XD	(Australia) Robin Middleton (Australia) Leanne Choo; 17–21, 21–19, 21–19	(Australia) Sawan Serasinghe (Australia) Setyana Mapasa
September 14	Polish International; Bieruń, Poland; International Series $5,000 – 32MS/32WS/24MD/24WD/24XD	(Malaysia) Iskandar Zulkarnain Zainuddin; 21–12, 21–18	(Denmark) Anders Antonsen
September 14	Polish International; Bieruń, Poland; International Series $5,000 – 32MS/32WS/24MD/24WD/24XD	(Malaysia) Ho Yen Mei; 21–16, 21–12	(Malaysia) Lim Chiew Sien
September 14	Polish International; Bieruń, Poland; International Series $5,000 – 32MS/32WS/24MD/24WD/24XD	(Denmark) Kasper Antonsen (Denmark) Niclas Nohr; 17–21, 21–8, 21–12	(Poland) Pawel Pietryja (Poland) Wojciech Szkudlarczyk
September 14	Polish International; Bieruń, Poland; International Series $5,000 – 32MS/32WS/24MD/24WD/24XD	(Sweden) Clara Nistad (Sweden) Emma Wengberg; 21–16, 6–21, 21–15	(England) Chloe Birch (England) Jessica Pugh
September 14	Polish International; Bieruń, Poland; International Series $5,000 – 32MS/32WS/24MD/24WD/24XD	(Denmark) Kasper Antonsen (Denmark) Amanda Madsen; 21–19, 21–12	(Malaysia) Wong Fai Yin (Malaysia) Chow Mei Kuan
September 14	Kampala International; Kampala, Uganda; Future Series $5,000 – 32MS/32WS/32MD/16WD/32XD	(South Africa) Jacob Maliekal; 21–8, 18–21, 21–10	(Uganda) Edwin Ekiring
September 14	Kampala International; Kampala, Uganda; Future Series $5,000 – 32MS/32WS/32MD/16WD/32XD	(Uganda) Bridget Shamim Bangi; 21–15, 21–7	(Uganda) Daisy Nakalyango
September 14	Kampala International; Kampala, Uganda; Future Series $5,000 – 32MS/32WS/32MD/16WD/32XD	(Uganda) Herbert Ebayo (Uganda) Jacob Musisi; 21–16, 24–22	(Uganda) Alex Babu (Uganda) Farook Waya
September 14	Kampala International; Kampala, Uganda; Future Series $5,000 – 32MS/32WS/32MD/16WD/32XD	(Uganda) Gloria Najjuka (Uganda) Daisy Nakalyango; 21–17, 21–11	(Uganda) Brenda Mugabi (Uganda) Aisha Nakiyemba
September 14	Kampala International; Kampala, Uganda; Future Series $5,000 – 32MS/32WS/32MD/16WD/32XD	(Uganda) Herbert Ebayo (Uganda) Daisy Nakalyango; 21–14, 21–7	(Uganda) Davies Senono (Uganda) Mable Namakoye
September 21	World Senior Championships; Helsingborg, Sweden; BWF Major Event; 35+ 64MS/64WS/64MD/32WD/64XD; 40+ 128MS/32WS/64MD/64WD/64XD; 45+ 128MS/64WS/64MD/32WD/64XD; 50+ 128MS/64WS/64MD/32WD/64XD; 55+ 64MS/32WS/64MD/32WD/64XD; 60+ 64MS/32WS/64MD/32WD/32XD; 65+ 64MS/32WS/32MD/32WD/32XD; 70+ 64MS/14WS (RR)/32MD/9WD (RR)/32XD	(Russia) Stanislav Pukhov; 21–13, 21–16	(Germany) Thorsten Hukriede
September 21	World Senior Championships; Helsingborg, Sweden; BWF Major Event; 35+ 64MS/64WS/64MD/32WD/64XD; 40+ 128MS/32WS/64MD/64WD/64XD; 45+ 128MS/64WS/64MD/32WD/64XD; 50+ 128MS/64WS/64MD/32WD/64XD; 55+ 64MS/32WS/64MD/32WD/64XD; 60+ 64MS/32WS/64MD/32WD/32XD; 65+ 64MS/32WS/32MD/32WD/32XD; 70+ 64MS/14WS (RR)/32MD/9WD (RR)/32XD	(England) Rebecca Pantaney; 21–8, 21–15	(Japan) Mayumi Bando
September 21	World Senior Championships; Helsingborg, Sweden; BWF Major Event; 35+ 64MS/64WS/64MD/32WD/64XD; 40+ 128MS/32WS/64MD/64WD/64XD; 45+ 128MS/64WS/64MD/32WD/64XD; 50+ 128MS/64WS/64MD/32WD/64XD; 55+ 64MS/32WS/64MD/32WD/64XD; 60+ 64MS/32WS/64MD/32WD/32XD; 65+ 64MS/32WS/32MD/32WD/32XD; 70+ 64MS/14WS (RR)/32MD/9WD (RR)/32XD	(United States) Tony Gunawan (Indonesia) Flandy Limpele; 21–13, 21–9	(Thailand) Naruenart Chuymak (Thailand) Apichai Thiraratsakul
September 21	World Senior Championships; Helsingborg, Sweden; BWF Major Event; 35+ 64MS/64WS/64MD/32WD/64XD; 40+ 128MS/32WS/64MD/64WD/64XD; 45+ 128MS/64WS/64MD/32WD/64XD; 50+ 128MS/64WS/64MD/32WD/64XD; 55+ 64MS/32WS/64MD/32WD/64XD; 60+ 64MS/32WS/64MD/32WD/32XD; 65+ 64MS/32WS/32MD/32WD/32XD; 70+ 64MS/14WS (RR)/32MD/9WD (RR)/32XD	(Japan) Kazumi Ichinohe (Japan) Noriko Sanada; 21–18, 21–15	(Sweden) Sunniva Aminoff (Germany) Claudia Vogelgsang
September 21	World Senior Championships; Helsingborg, Sweden; BWF Major Event; 35+ 64MS/64WS/64MD/32WD/64XD; 40+ 128MS/32WS/64MD/64WD/64XD; 45+ 128MS/64WS/64MD/32WD/64XD; 50+ 128MS/64WS/64MD/32WD/64XD; 55+ 64MS/32WS/64MD/32WD/64XD; 60+ 64MS/32WS/64MD/32WD/32XD; 65+ 64MS/32WS/32MD/32WD/32XD; 70+ 64MS/14WS (RR)/32MD/9WD (RR)/32XD	(Denmark) Tommy Sørensen (Denmark) Lisbeth T. Haagensen; 21–17, 21–12	(Germany) Thorsten Hukriede (Germany) Michaela Hukriede
September 21	World Senior Championships; Helsingborg, Sweden; BWF Major Event; 35+ 64MS/64WS/64MD/32WD/64XD; 40+ 128MS/32WS/64MD/64WD/64XD; 45+ 128MS/64WS/64MD/32WD/64XD; 50+ 128MS/64WS/64MD/32WD/64XD; 55+ 64MS/32WS/64MD/32WD/64XD; 60+ 64MS/32WS/64MD/32WD/32XD; 65+ 64MS/32WS/32MD/32WD/32XD; 70+ 64MS/14WS (RR)/32MD/9WD (RR)/32XD	(Denmark) Peter Rasmussen; 21–17, 21–11	(Austria) Jürgen Koch
September 21	World Senior Championships; Helsingborg, Sweden; BWF Major Event; 35+ 64MS/64WS/64MD/32WD/64XD; 40+ 128MS/32WS/64MD/64WD/64XD; 45+ 128MS/64WS/64MD/32WD/64XD; 50+ 128MS/64WS/64MD/32WD/64XD; 55+ 64MS/32WS/64MD/32WD/64XD; 60+ 64MS/32WS/64MD/32WD/32XD; 65+ 64MS/32WS/32MD/32WD/32XD; 70+ 64MS/14WS (RR)/32MD/9WD (RR)/32XD	(Netherlands) Georgy van Soerland-Trouerbach; 21–10, 21–10	(Denmark) Pernille Strøm
September 21	World Senior Championships; Helsingborg, Sweden; BWF Major Event; 35+ 64MS/64WS/64MD/32WD/64XD; 40+ 128MS/32WS/64MD/64WD/64XD; 45+ 128MS/64WS/64MD/32WD/64XD; 50+ 128MS/64WS/64MD/32WD/64XD; 55+ 64MS/32WS/64MD/32WD/64XD; 60+ 64MS/32WS/64MD/32WD/32XD; 65+ 64MS/32WS/32MD/32WD/32XD; 70+ 64MS/14WS (RR)/32MD/9WD (RR)/32XD	(Indonesia) Hariyanto Arbi (Indonesia) Tri Kusharjanto; 21–19, 21–17	(Denmark) Peter Rasmussen (Denmark) Thomas Stavngaard
September 21	World Senior Championships; Helsingborg, Sweden; BWF Major Event; 35+ 64MS/64WS/64MD/32WD/64XD; 40+ 128MS/32WS/64MD/64WD/64XD; 45+ 128MS/64WS/64MD/32WD/64XD; 50+ 128MS/64WS/64MD/32WD/64XD; 55+ 64MS/32WS/64MD/32WD/64XD; 60+ 64MS/32WS/64MD/32WD/32XD; 65+ 64MS/32WS/32MD/32WD/32XD; 70+ 64MS/14WS (RR)/32MD/9WD (RR)/32XD	(Russia) Natalia Gonchar (Russia) Olga Kuznetsova; 21–16, 21–15	(Hungary) Csilla Gondane Forian (Bulgaria) Reni Hassan
September 21	World Senior Championships; Helsingborg, Sweden; BWF Major Event; 35+ 64MS/64WS/64MD/32WD/64XD; 40+ 128MS/32WS/64MD/64WD/64XD; 45+ 128MS/64WS/64MD/32WD/64XD; 50+ 128MS/64WS/64MD/32WD/64XD; 55+ 64MS/32WS/64MD/32WD/64XD; 60+ 64MS/32WS/64MD/32WD/32XD; 65+ 64MS/32WS/32MD/32WD/32XD; 70+ 64MS/14WS (RR)/32MD/9WD (RR)/32XD	(Denmark) Carsten Loesch (Denmark) Dorte Steenberg; 21–17, 21–13	(Sweden) Erik Sjostedt (Sweden) Nilofar Mosavar Rahmani
September 21	World Senior Championships; Helsingborg, Sweden; BWF Major Event; 35+ 64MS/64WS/64MD/32WD/64XD; 40+ 128MS/32WS/64MD/64WD/64XD; 45+ 128MS/64WS/64MD/32WD/64XD; 50+ 128MS/64WS/64MD/32WD/64XD; 55+ 64MS/32WS/64MD/32WD/64XD; 60+ 64MS/32WS/64MD/32WD/32XD; 65+ 64MS/32WS/32MD/32WD/32XD; 70+ 64MS/14WS (RR)/32MD/9WD (RR)/32XD	(Chinese Taipei) Wu Chang-jun; 21–18, 22–20	(Chinese Taipei) Liu En-horng
September 21	World Senior Championships; Helsingborg, Sweden; BWF Major Event; 35+ 64MS/64WS/64MD/32WD/64XD; 40+ 128MS/32WS/64MD/64WD/64XD; 45+ 128MS/64WS/64MD/32WD/64XD; 50+ 128MS/64WS/64MD/32WD/64XD; 55+ 64MS/32WS/64MD/32WD/64XD; 60+ 64MS/32WS/64MD/32WD/32XD; 65+ 64MS/32WS/32MD/32WD/32XD; 70+ 64MS/14WS (RR)/32MD/9WD (RR)/32XD	(Denmark) Gitte Sommer; 21–17, 21–14	(Hungary) Csilla Gondane Forian
September 21	World Senior Championships; Helsingborg, Sweden; BWF Major Event; 35+ 64MS/64WS/64MD/32WD/64XD; 40+ 128MS/32WS/64MD/64WD/64XD; 45+ 128MS/64WS/64MD/32WD/64XD; 50+ 128MS/64WS/64MD/32WD/64XD; 55+ 64MS/32WS/64MD/32WD/64XD; 60+ 64MS/32WS/64MD/32WD/32XD; 65+ 64MS/32WS/32MD/32WD/32XD; 70+ 64MS/14WS (RR)/32MD/9WD (RR)/32XD	(Chinese Taipei) Liu En-horng (Chinese Taipei) Wu Chang-jun; 21–15, 21–8	(Russia) Oleg Grigoryev (Russia) Vadim Nazarov
September 21	World Senior Championships; Helsingborg, Sweden; BWF Major Event; 35+ 64MS/64WS/64MD/32WD/64XD; 40+ 128MS/32WS/64MD/64WD/64XD; 45+ 128MS/64WS/64MD/32WD/64XD; 50+ 128MS/64WS/64MD/32WD/64XD; 55+ 64MS/32WS/64MD/32WD/64XD; 60+ 64MS/32WS/64MD/32WD/32XD; 65+ 64MS/32WS/32MD/32WD/32XD; 70+ 64MS/14WS (RR)/32MD/9WD (RR)/32XD	(Denmark) Anne Birgitte Nielsen (Denmark) Gitte Sommer; 24–22, 16–21, 21–10	(Japan) Mie Hanyu (Japan) Akiko Ueda
September 21	World Senior Championships; Helsingborg, Sweden; BWF Major Event; 35+ 64MS/64WS/64MD/32WD/64XD; 40+ 128MS/32WS/64MD/64WD/64XD; 45+ 128MS/64WS/64MD/32WD/64XD; 50+ 128MS/64WS/64MD/32WD/64XD; 55+ 64MS/32WS/64MD/32WD/64XD; 60+ 64MS/32WS/64MD/32WD/32XD; 65+ 64MS/32WS/32MD/32WD/32XD; 70+ 64MS/14WS (RR)/32MD/9WD (RR)/32XD	(Denmark) Bo Sorensen (Denmark) Gitte Sommer; 25–23, 21–8	(Denmark) Jakob Oestergaard (Denmark) Lene Struwe Andersen
September 21	World Senior Championships; Helsingborg, Sweden; BWF Major Event; 35+ 64MS/64WS/64MD/32WD/64XD; 40+ 128MS/32WS/64MD/64WD/64XD; 45+ 128MS/64WS/64MD/32WD/64XD; 50+ 128MS/64WS/64MD/32WD/64XD; 55+ 64MS/32WS/64MD/32WD/64XD; 60+ 64MS/32WS/64MD/32WD/32XD; 65+ 64MS/32WS/32MD/32WD/32XD; 70+ 64MS/14WS (RR)/32MD/9WD (RR)/32XD	(Chinese Taipei) Chang Wen-sung; 21–19, 14–21, 21–16	(Thailand) Narong Vanichitsarakul
September 21	World Senior Championships; Helsingborg, Sweden; BWF Major Event; 35+ 64MS/64WS/64MD/32WD/64XD; 40+ 128MS/32WS/64MD/64WD/64XD; 45+ 128MS/64WS/64MD/32WD/64XD; 50+ 128MS/64WS/64MD/32WD/64XD; 55+ 64MS/32WS/64MD/32WD/64XD; 60+ 64MS/32WS/64MD/32WD/32XD; 65+ 64MS/32WS/32MD/32WD/32XD; 70+ 64MS/14WS (RR)/32MD/9WD (RR)/32XD	(Denmark) Lone Hagelskjaer Knudsen; 14–21, 21–13, 21–12	(Netherlands) Jeannette van der Werff
September 21	World Senior Championships; Helsingborg, Sweden; BWF Major Event; 35+ 64MS/64WS/64MD/32WD/64XD; 40+ 128MS/32WS/64MD/64WD/64XD; 45+ 128MS/64WS/64MD/32WD/64XD; 50+ 128MS/64WS/64MD/32WD/64XD; 55+ 64MS/32WS/64MD/32WD/64XD; 60+ 64MS/32WS/64MD/32WD/32XD; 65+ 64MS/32WS/32MD/32WD/32XD; 70+ 64MS/14WS (RR)/32MD/9WD (RR)/32XD	(Thailand) Surachai Makkasasithorn (Thailand) Narong Vanichitsarakul; 21–13, 21–9	(Indonesia) Karyanto Tan (Indonesia) Suganyanto Hadi Wahono
September 21	World Senior Championships; Helsingborg, Sweden; BWF Major Event; 35+ 64MS/64WS/64MD/32WD/64XD; 40+ 128MS/32WS/64MD/64WD/64XD; 45+ 128MS/64WS/64MD/32WD/64XD; 50+ 128MS/64WS/64MD/32WD/64XD; 55+ 64MS/32WS/64MD/32WD/64XD; 60+ 64MS/32WS/64MD/32WD/32XD; 65+ 64MS/32WS/32MD/32WD/32XD; 70+ 64MS/14WS (RR)/32MD/9WD (RR)/32XD	(Denmark) Charlotte Dew-Hattens (Denmark) Grete Sahlertz Kragejaer; 21–13, 21–14	(England) Cathy Bargh (England) Kay Vickers
September 21	World Senior Championships; Helsingborg, Sweden; BWF Major Event; 35+ 64MS/64WS/64MD/32WD/64XD; 40+ 128MS/32WS/64MD/64WD/64XD; 45+ 128MS/64WS/64MD/32WD/64XD; 50+ 128MS/64WS/64MD/32WD/64XD; 55+ 64MS/32WS/64MD/32WD/64XD; 60+ 64MS/32WS/64MD/32WD/32XD; 65+ 64MS/32WS/32MD/32WD/32XD; 70+ 64MS/14WS (RR)/32MD/9WD (RR)/32XD	(Chinese Taipei) Chang Wen-sung (Hong Kong) Zhou Xin; 15–21, 21–15, 21–16	(Denmark) Morten Christensen (Denmark) Helle Sjorring
September 21	World Senior Championships; Helsingborg, Sweden; BWF Major Event; 35+ 64MS/64WS/64MD/32WD/64XD; 40+ 128MS/32WS/64MD/64WD/64XD; 45+ 128MS/64WS/64MD/32WD/64XD; 50+ 128MS/64WS/64MD/32WD/64XD; 55+ 64MS/32WS/64MD/32WD/64XD; 60+ 64MS/32WS/64MD/32WD/32XD; 65+ 64MS/32WS/32MD/32WD/32XD; 70+ 64MS/14WS (RR)/32MD/9WD (RR)/32XD	(Indonesia) Hastomo Arbi; 21–11, 21–13	(Canada) Jack Keith Priestman
September 21	World Senior Championships; Helsingborg, Sweden; BWF Major Event; 35+ 64MS/64WS/64MD/32WD/64XD; 40+ 128MS/32WS/64MD/64WD/64XD; 45+ 128MS/64WS/64MD/32WD/64XD; 50+ 128MS/64WS/64MD/32WD/64XD; 55+ 64MS/32WS/64MD/32WD/64XD; 60+ 64MS/32WS/64MD/32WD/32XD; 65+ 64MS/32WS/32MD/32WD/32XD; 70+ 64MS/14WS (RR)/32MD/9WD (RR)/32XD	(Germany) Heidi Bender; 21–6, 21–8	(England) Linda Wood
September 21	World Senior Championships; Helsingborg, Sweden; BWF Major Event; 35+ 64MS/64WS/64MD/32WD/64XD; 40+ 128MS/32WS/64MD/64WD/64XD; 45+ 128MS/64WS/64MD/32WD/64XD; 50+ 128MS/64WS/64MD/32WD/64XD; 55+ 64MS/32WS/64MD/32WD/64XD; 60+ 64MS/32WS/64MD/32WD/32XD; 65+ 64MS/32WS/32MD/32WD/32XD; 70+ 64MS/14WS (RR)/32MD/9WD (RR)/32XD	(Indonesia) Uun Setiawan Santoso (Indonesia) Simbarsono Sutanto; 21–18, 21–12	(Thailand) Trirong Limsakul (Thailand) Attakorn Maensamut
September 21	World Senior Championships; Helsingborg, Sweden; BWF Major Event; 35+ 64MS/64WS/64MD/32WD/64XD; 40+ 128MS/32WS/64MD/64WD/64XD; 45+ 128MS/64WS/64MD/32WD/64XD; 50+ 128MS/64WS/64MD/32WD/64XD; 55+ 64MS/32WS/64MD/32WD/64XD; 60+ 64MS/32WS/64MD/32WD/32XD; 65+ 64MS/32WS/32MD/32WD/32XD; 70+ 64MS/14WS (RR)/32MD/9WD (RR)/32XD	(Germany) Heidi Bender (Germany) Maren Schröder; 21–17, 18–21, 21–15	(England) Jennifer A Cox (England) Christine M Crossley
September 21	World Senior Championships; Helsingborg, Sweden; BWF Major Event; 35+ 64MS/64WS/64MD/32WD/64XD; 40+ 128MS/32WS/64MD/64WD/64XD; 45+ 128MS/64WS/64MD/32WD/64XD; 50+ 128MS/64WS/64MD/32WD/64XD; 55+ 64MS/32WS/64MD/32WD/64XD; 60+ 64MS/32WS/64MD/32WD/32XD; 65+ 64MS/32WS/32MD/32WD/32XD; 70+ 64MS/14WS (RR)/32MD/9WD (RR)/32XD	(Germany) Stefan Frey (Germany) Heidi Bender; 22–20, 21–10	(Japan) Toshiyuki Kamiya (Japan) Kuniko Yamamoto
September 21	World Senior Championships; Helsingborg, Sweden; BWF Major Event; 35+ 64MS/64WS/64MD/32WD/64XD; 40+ 128MS/32WS/64MD/64WD/64XD; 45+ 128MS/64WS/64MD/32WD/64XD; 50+ 128MS/64WS/64MD/32WD/64XD; 55+ 64MS/32WS/64MD/32WD/64XD; 60+ 64MS/32WS/64MD/32WD/32XD; 65+ 64MS/32WS/32MD/32WD/32XD; 70+ 64MS/14WS (RR)/32MD/9WD (RR)/32XD	(Denmark) Claus B Andersen; 21–14, 21–15	(Japan) Toshio Kawaguchi
September 21	World Senior Championships; Helsingborg, Sweden; BWF Major Event; 35+ 64MS/64WS/64MD/32WD/64XD; 40+ 128MS/32WS/64MD/64WD/64XD; 45+ 128MS/64WS/64MD/32WD/64XD; 50+ 128MS/64WS/64MD/32WD/64XD; 55+ 64MS/32WS/64MD/32WD/64XD; 60+ 64MS/32WS/64MD/32WD/32XD; 65+ 64MS/32WS/32MD/32WD/32XD; 70+ 64MS/14WS (RR)/32MD/9WD (RR)/32XD	(England) Christine M Crossley; 21–15, 21–19	(Scotland) Christine Black
September 21	World Senior Championships; Helsingborg, Sweden; BWF Major Event; 35+ 64MS/64WS/64MD/32WD/64XD; 40+ 128MS/32WS/64MD/64WD/64XD; 45+ 128MS/64WS/64MD/32WD/64XD; 50+ 128MS/64WS/64MD/32WD/64XD; 55+ 64MS/32WS/64MD/32WD/64XD; 60+ 64MS/32WS/64MD/32WD/32XD; 65+ 64MS/32WS/32MD/32WD/32XD; 70+ 64MS/14WS (RR)/32MD/9WD (RR)/32XD	(Thailand) Jiamsak Panitchaikul (Thailand) Surapong Suharitdumrong; 21–12, 21–11	(England) William Hamblett (England) Graham Holt
September 21	World Senior Championships; Helsingborg, Sweden; BWF Major Event; 35+ 64MS/64WS/64MD/32WD/64XD; 40+ 128MS/32WS/64MD/64WD/64XD; 45+ 128MS/64WS/64MD/32WD/64XD; 50+ 128MS/64WS/64MD/32WD/64XD; 55+ 64MS/32WS/64MD/32WD/64XD; 60+ 64MS/32WS/64MD/32WD/32XD; 65+ 64MS/32WS/32MD/32WD/32XD; 70+ 64MS/14WS (RR)/32MD/9WD (RR)/32XD	(Scotland) Christine Black (Netherlands) Marjan Ridder; 21–16, 21–8	(England) Marguerite Butt (England) Ann Hurst
September 21	World Senior Championships; Helsingborg, Sweden; BWF Major Event; 35+ 64MS/64WS/64MD/32WD/64XD; 40+ 128MS/32WS/64MD/64WD/64XD; 45+ 128MS/64WS/64MD/32WD/64XD; 50+ 128MS/64WS/64MD/32WD/64XD; 55+ 64MS/32WS/64MD/32WD/64XD; 60+ 64MS/32WS/64MD/32WD/32XD; 65+ 64MS/32WS/32MD/32WD/32XD; 70+ 64MS/14WS (RR)/32MD/9WD (RR)/32XD	(Netherlands) Rob Ridder (Netherlands) Marjan Ridder; 21–13, 21–10	(England) Graham Holt (England) Ann Hurst
September 21	World Senior Championships; Helsingborg, Sweden; BWF Major Event; 35+ 64MS/64WS/64MD/32WD/64XD; 40+ 128MS/32WS/64MD/64WD/64XD; 45+ 128MS/64WS/64MD/32WD/64XD; 50+ 128MS/64WS/64MD/32WD/64XD; 55+ 64MS/32WS/64MD/32WD/64XD; 60+ 64MS/32WS/64MD/32WD/32XD; 65+ 64MS/32WS/32MD/32WD/32XD; 70+ 64MS/14WS (RR)/32MD/9WD (RR)/32XD	(South Africa) Johan Croukamp; 24–22, 21–12	(Germany) Per Dabelsteen
September 21	World Senior Championships; Helsingborg, Sweden; BWF Major Event; 35+ 64MS/64WS/64MD/32WD/64XD; 40+ 128MS/32WS/64MD/64WD/64XD; 45+ 128MS/64WS/64MD/32WD/64XD; 50+ 128MS/64WS/64MD/32WD/64XD; 55+ 64MS/32WS/64MD/32WD/64XD; 60+ 64MS/32WS/64MD/32WD/32XD; 65+ 64MS/32WS/32MD/32WD/32XD; 70+ 64MS/14WS (RR)/32MD/9WD (RR)/32XD	(United States) Rose Lei; 21-12, 21-12	(Japan) Yuriko Okemoto
September 21	World Senior Championships; Helsingborg, Sweden; BWF Major Event; 35+ 64MS/64WS/64MD/32WD/64XD; 40+ 128MS/32WS/64MD/64WD/64XD; 45+ 128MS/64WS/64MD/32WD/64XD; 50+ 128MS/64WS/64MD/32WD/64XD; 55+ 64MS/32WS/64MD/32WD/64XD; 60+ 64MS/32WS/64MD/32WD/32XD; 65+ 64MS/32WS/32MD/32WD/32XD; 70+ 64MS/14WS (RR)/32MD/9WD (RR)/32XD	(England) Robert J Bell (England) Royston V Lord; 21-18, 21-8	(India) Vidya Bhushan Arora (India) Sushil Kumar Patet
September 21	World Senior Championships; Helsingborg, Sweden; BWF Major Event; 35+ 64MS/64WS/64MD/32WD/64XD; 40+ 128MS/32WS/64MD/64WD/64XD; 45+ 128MS/64WS/64MD/32WD/64XD; 50+ 128MS/64WS/64MD/32WD/64XD; 55+ 64MS/32WS/64MD/32WD/64XD; 60+ 64MS/32WS/64MD/32WD/32XD; 65+ 64MS/32WS/32MD/32WD/32XD; 70+ 64MS/14WS (RR)/32MD/9WD (RR)/32XD	(Japan) Yoko Akiyama (Japan) Yasuko Kataito; 21–13, 7–21, 21–16	(Japan) Sumiko Kaneko (Japan) Yuriko Okemoto
September 21	World Senior Championships; Helsingborg, Sweden; BWF Major Event; 35+ 64MS/64WS/64MD/32WD/64XD; 40+ 128MS/32WS/64MD/64WD/64XD; 45+ 128MS/64WS/64MD/32WD/64XD; 50+ 128MS/64WS/64MD/32WD/64XD; 55+ 64MS/32WS/64MD/32WD/64XD; 60+ 64MS/32WS/64MD/32WD/32XD; 65+ 64MS/32WS/32MD/32WD/32XD; 70+ 64MS/14WS (RR)/32MD/9WD (RR)/32XD	(England) Royston V Lord (England) Eileen M Carley; 12–21, 21–13, 21–13	(England) Robert J Bell (England) Penelope A Shears
September 21	World Senior Championships; Helsingborg, Sweden; BWF Major Event; 35+ 64MS/64WS/64MD/32WD/64XD; 40+ 128MS/32WS/64MD/64WD/64XD; 45+ 128MS/64WS/64MD/32WD/64XD; 50+ 128MS/64WS/64MD/32WD/64XD; 55+ 64MS/32WS/64MD/32WD/64XD; 60+ 64MS/32WS/64MD/32WD/32XD; 65+ 64MS/32WS/32MD/32WD/32XD; 70+ 64MS/14WS (RR)/32MD/9WD (RR)/32XD	(Germany) Joachim Schimpke; 24–22, 21–12	(Germany) Gerd Pigola
September 21	World Senior Championships; Helsingborg, Sweden; BWF Major Event; 35+ 64MS/64WS/64MD/32WD/64XD; 40+ 128MS/32WS/64MD/64WD/64XD; 45+ 128MS/64WS/64MD/32WD/64XD; 50+ 128MS/64WS/64MD/32WD/64XD; 55+ 64MS/32WS/64MD/32WD/64XD; 60+ 64MS/32WS/64MD/32WD/32XD; 65+ 64MS/32WS/32MD/32WD/32XD; 70+ 64MS/14WS (RR)/32MD/9WD (RR)/32XD	(Germany) Renate Gabriel; 19–21, 21–14, 21–8	(England) Barbara Gibson
September 21	World Senior Championships; Helsingborg, Sweden; BWF Major Event; 35+ 64MS/64WS/64MD/32WD/64XD; 40+ 128MS/32WS/64MD/64WD/64XD; 45+ 128MS/64WS/64MD/32WD/64XD; 50+ 128MS/64WS/64MD/32WD/64XD; 55+ 64MS/32WS/64MD/32WD/64XD; 60+ 64MS/32WS/64MD/32WD/32XD; 65+ 64MS/32WS/32MD/32WD/32XD; 70+ 64MS/14WS (RR)/32MD/9WD (RR)/32XD	(Malaysia) Ching Kon Kong (Malaysia) Loo Ah Hooi; 21–11, 21–18	(Japan) Akira Hirota (Japan) Shinjiro Matsuda
September 21	World Senior Championships; Helsingborg, Sweden; BWF Major Event; 35+ 64MS/64WS/64MD/32WD/64XD; 40+ 128MS/32WS/64MD/64WD/64XD; 45+ 128MS/64WS/64MD/32WD/64XD; 50+ 128MS/64WS/64MD/32WD/64XD; 55+ 64MS/32WS/64MD/32WD/64XD; 60+ 64MS/32WS/64MD/32WD/32XD; 65+ 64MS/32WS/32MD/32WD/32XD; 70+ 64MS/14WS (RR)/32MD/9WD (RR)/32XD	(England) Beryl Goodall (England) Kathleen Jenner; 21–11, 24–22	(Japan) Satoko Nakamura (Japan) Sanae Uno
September 21	World Senior Championships; Helsingborg, Sweden; BWF Major Event; 35+ 64MS/64WS/64MD/32WD/64XD; 40+ 128MS/32WS/64MD/64WD/64XD; 45+ 128MS/64WS/64MD/32WD/64XD; 50+ 128MS/64WS/64MD/32WD/64XD; 55+ 64MS/32WS/64MD/32WD/64XD; 60+ 64MS/32WS/64MD/32WD/32XD; 65+ 64MS/32WS/32MD/32WD/32XD; 70+ 64MS/14WS (RR)/32MD/9WD (RR)/32XD	(England) Kenneth Tantum (England) Joanna Elson; 21–16, 17–21, 21–12	(England) Roger Baldwin (England) Victoria Betts
September 21	Sydney International; Sydney, Australia; International Challenge $15,000 – 64MS/32WS/32MD/32WD/32XD	(Vietnam) Nguyễn Tiến Minh; 21–11, 21–12	(Malaysia) Zulfadli Zulkiffli
September 21	Sydney International; Sydney, Australia; International Challenge $15,000 – 64MS/32WS/32MD/32WD/32XD	(Thailand) Pornpawee Chochuwong; 21–11, 14–21, 21–19	(Turkey) Özge Bayrak
September 21	Sydney International; Sydney, Australia; International Challenge $15,000 – 64MS/32WS/32MD/32WD/32XD	(Malaysia) Jagdish Singh (Malaysia) Roni Tan Wee Long; 13–21, 21–17, 21–11	(Chinese Taipei) Liu Wei-chen (Chinese Taipei) Yang Po-Han
September 21	Sydney International; Sydney, Australia; International Challenge $15,000 – 64MS/32WS/32MD/32WD/32XD	(Thailand) Jongkongphan Kittiharakul (Thailand) Rawinda Prajongjai; 21–13, 21–5	(Australia) Setyana Mapasa (Australia) Gronya Somerville
September 21	Sydney International; Sydney, Australia; International Challenge $15,000 – 64MS/32WS/32MD/32WD/32XD	(Australia) Robin Middleton (Australia) Leanne Choo; 21–8, 21–17	(United States) Phillip Chew (United States) Jamie Subandhi
September 21	Mongolia International; Ulaanbaatar, Mongolia; International Series $5,000 – 32MS/32WS/16MD/16WD/16XD	(South Korea) Lee Cheol-ho; 21–17, 21–19	(South Korea) Rho Ye-wook
September 21	Mongolia International; Ulaanbaatar, Mongolia; International Series $5,000 – 32MS/32WS/16MD/16WD/16XD	(South Korea) Lim Soo-bin; 21–17, 21–16	(South Korea) Ji Choi-min
September 21	Mongolia International; Ulaanbaatar, Mongolia; International Series $5,000 – 32MS/32WS/16MD/16WD/16XD	(South Korea) Kim Dae-sung (South Korea) Kim Young-sun; 21–15, 21–11	(South Korea) Yong Hoon-jin (South Korea) Lee Cheol-ho
September 21	Mongolia International; Ulaanbaatar, Mongolia; International Series $5,000 – 32MS/32WS/16MD/16WD/16XD	(South Korea) Ga Ae-kang (South Korea) Lee Ja-yeong; 21–18, 21–18	(South Korea) Lim Soo-bin (South Korea) Oh Bo-kyung
September 21	Mongolia International; Ulaanbaatar, Mongolia; International Series $5,000 – 32MS/32WS/16MD/16WD/16XD	(South Korea) Kim Young-sun (South Korea) Lee Ja-yeong; 21–17, 21–16	(South Korea) Kim Dae-sung (South Korea) Ga Ae-kang
September 21	Czech Open; Prague, Czech Republic; International Challenge $15,000 – 32MS/32WS/24MD/24WD/24XD	(Germany) Marc Zwiebler; 26–24, 21–11	(Croatia) Zvonimir Đurkinjak
September 21	Czech Open; Prague, Czech Republic; International Challenge $15,000 – 32MS/32WS/24MD/24WD/24XD	(Scotland) Kirsty Gilmour; 21–16, 21–14	(Bulgaria) Linda Zechiri
September 21	Czech Open; Prague, Czech Republic; International Challenge $15,000 – 32MS/32WS/24MD/24WD/24XD	(Poland) Przemysław Wacha (Poland) Adam Cwalina; 19–21, 22–20, 21–14	(India) Manu Attri (India) B. Sumeeth Reddy
September 21	Czech Open; Prague, Czech Republic; International Challenge $15,000 – 32MS/32WS/24MD/24WD/24XD	(Germany) Isabel Herttrich (Germany) Birgit Michels; 21–13, 21–9	(France) Marie Batomene (France) Emilie Lefel
September 21	Czech Open; Prague, Czech Republic; International Challenge $15,000 – 32MS/32WS/24MD/24WD/24XD	(Russia) Vitalij Durkin (Russia) Nina Vislova; 21–18, 21–19	(Germany) Michael Fuchs (Germany) Birgit Michels
September 21	Colombia International; Medellín, Colombia; International Series $5,000 – 32MS/32WS/32MD/32WD/32XD	(United States) Bjorn Seguin; 21–18, 21–18	(Brazil) Daniel Paiola
September 21	Colombia International; Medellín, Colombia; International Series $5,000 – 32MS/32WS/32MD/32WD/32XD	(Italy) Jeanine Cicognini; 21–15, 12–21, 21–13	(Brazil) Fabiana Silva
September 21	Colombia International; Medellín, Colombia; International Series $5,000 – 32MS/32WS/32MD/32WD/32XD	(Brazil) Daniel Paiola (Brazil) Alex Yuwan Tjong; 21–16, 21–17	(Italy) Giovanni Greco (Italy) Rosario Maddaloni
September 21	Colombia International; Medellín, Colombia; International Series $5,000 – 32MS/32WS/32MD/32WD/32XD	(Brazil) Ana Paula Campos (Brazil) Fabiana Silva; 21–18, 21–17	(Mexico) Haramara Gaitan (Mexico) Sabrina Solis
September 21	Colombia International; Medellín, Colombia; International Series $5,000 – 32MS/32WS/32MD/32WD/32XD	(Brazil) Alex Yuwan Tjong (Brazil) Fabiana Silva; 21–19, 19–21, 21–14	(Peru) Daniel La Torre Regal (Peru) Daniela Macias
September 21	Ethiopia International; Addis Ababa, Ethiopia; International Series $5,000 – 32MS/32WS/32MD/16WD/32XD	(Israel) Misha Zilberman; 21–13, 21–9	(Austria) Luka Wraber
September 21	Ethiopia International; Addis Ababa, Ethiopia; International Series $5,000 – 32MS/32WS/32MD/16WD/32XD	(Turkey) Cemre Fere; 21–11, 22–20	(Nigeria) Grace Gabriel
September 21	Ethiopia International; Addis Ababa, Ethiopia; International Series $5,000 – 32MS/32WS/32MD/16WD/32XD	(South Africa) Andries Malan (South Africa) Wiaan Viljoen; 21–10, 21–13	(Turkey) Emre Vural (Turkey) Sinan Zorlu
September 21	Ethiopia International; Addis Ababa, Ethiopia; International Series $5,000 – 32MS/32WS/32MD/16WD/32XD	(Turkey) Cemre Fere (Turkey) Ebru Yazgan; 21–10, 21–9	(Egypt) Nadine Ashraf (Egypt) Menna Eltanany
September 21	Ethiopia International; Addis Ababa, Ethiopia; International Series $5,000 – 32MS/32WS/32MD/16WD/32XD	(Egypt) Ahmed Salah (Egypt) Menna Eltanany; 21–15, 21–16	(Egypt) Ali Ahmed El Khateeb (Egypt) Doha Hany
September 28	Thailand Open; Bangkok, Thailand; Grand Prix Gold $120,000 – 64MS/32WS/32MD/32WD/32XD; Draw	(South Korea) Lee Hyun-il; 21–17, 22–24, 21–8	(Indonesia) Ihsan Maulana Mustofa
September 28	Thailand Open; Bangkok, Thailand; Grand Prix Gold $120,000 – 64MS/32WS/32MD/32WD/32XD; Draw	(South Korea) Sung Ji-hyun; 21–11, 21–14	(Singapore) Liang Xiaoyu
September 28	Thailand Open; Bangkok, Thailand; Grand Prix Gold $120,000 – 64MS/32WS/32MD/32WD/32XD; Draw	(Indonesia) Wahyu Nayaka (Indonesia) Ade Yusuf; 20–22, 23–21, 21–16	(Malaysia) Koo Kien Keat (Malaysia) Tan Boon Heong
September 28	Thailand Open; Bangkok, Thailand; Grand Prix Gold $120,000 – 64MS/32WS/32MD/32WD/32XD; Draw	(China) Huang Dongping (China) Li Yinhui; 20–22, 21–11, 21–15	(South Korea) Chang Ye-na (South Korea) Lee So-hee
September 28	Thailand Open; Bangkok, Thailand; Grand Prix Gold $120,000 – 64MS/32WS/32MD/32WD/32XD; Draw	(South Korea) Choi Sol-gyu (South Korea) Eom Hye-won; 21–19, 17–21, 21–16	(Indonesia) Praveen Jordan (Indonesia) Debby Susanto
September 28	Bulgarian International; Sofia, Bulgaria; International Challenge $15,000 – 32MS/32WS/24MD/24WD/24XD	(Spain) Pablo Abián; 21–17, 16–21, 21–19	(India) Gurusai Dutt
September 28	Bulgarian International; Sofia, Bulgaria; International Challenge $15,000 – 32MS/32WS/24MD/24WD/24XD	(Germany) Olga Konon; 19–21, 21–16, 21–14	(Ukraine) Marija Ulitina
September 28	Bulgarian International; Sofia, Bulgaria; International Challenge $15,000 – 32MS/32WS/24MD/24WD/24XD	(Germany) Raphael Beck (Germany) Peter Kaesbauer; 21–14, 21–16	(India) Manu Attri (India) B. Sumeeth Reddy
September 28	Bulgarian International; Sofia, Bulgaria; International Challenge $15,000 – 32MS/32WS/24MD/24WD/24XD	(Bulgaria) Gabriela Stoeva (Bulgaria) Stefani Stoeva; 21–14, 21–10	(United States) Eva Lee (United States) Paula Lynn Obanana
September 28	Bulgarian International; Sofia, Bulgaria; International Challenge $15,000 – 32MS/32WS/24MD/24WD/24XD	(Poland) Robert Mateusiak (Poland) Nadieżda Zięba; 21–14, 21–18	(Russia) Evgenij Dremin (Russia) Evgenia Dimova
September 28	Nigeria International; Abuja, Nigeria; International Series $5,000 – 32MS/32WS/32MD/16WD/32XD	(United States) Howard Shu; 17–21, 21–14, 21–13	(Austria) Luka Wraber
September 28	Nigeria International; Abuja, Nigeria; International Series $5,000 – 32MS/32WS/32MD/16WD/32XD	(Nigeria) Grace Gabriel; 14–21, 21–11, 21–12	(Mauritius) Kate Foo Kune
September 28	Nigeria International; Abuja, Nigeria; International Series $5,000 – 32MS/32WS/32MD/16WD/32XD	(Turkey) Emre Vural (Turkey) Sinan Zorlu; 21–14, 21–19	(Egypt) Ali El Khateeb (Egypt) Abdelrahman Kashkal
September 28	Nigeria International; Abuja, Nigeria; International Series $5,000 – 32MS/32WS/32MD/16WD/32XD	(Turkey) Cemre Fere (Turkey) Ebru Yazgan; 21–14, 21–14	(Nigeria) Grace Gabriel (Nigeria) Braimoh Maria
September 28	Nigeria International; Abuja, Nigeria; International Series $5,000 – 32MS/32WS/32MD/16WD/32XD	(Nigeria) Olorunfemi Elewa (Nigeria) Susan Ideh; 21–19, 21–17	(Ghana) Daniel Sam (Ghana) Gifty Mensah
September 28	Vietnam International Series; Da Nang, Vietnam; International Series $5,000 – 64MS/32WS/32MD/32WD/32XD	(Indonesia) Krishna Adi Nugraha; 21–19, 15–21, 21–14	(Indonesia) Enzi Shafira
September 28	Vietnam International Series; Da Nang, Vietnam; International Series $5,000 – 64MS/32WS/32MD/32WD/32XD	(Malaysia) Goh Jin Wei; 21–9, 21–13	(Chinese Taipei) Chen Su-yu
September 28	Vietnam International Series; Da Nang, Vietnam; International Series $5,000 – 64MS/32WS/32MD/32WD/32XD	(Indonesia) Hardianto (Indonesia) Kenas Adi Haryanto; 21–14, 21–14	(Indonesia) Hantoro (Indonesia) Rian Swastedian
September 28	Vietnam International Series; Da Nang, Vietnam; International Series $5,000 – 64MS/32WS/32MD/32WD/32XD	(Indonesia) Gebby Ristiyani Imawan (Indonesia) Tiara Rosalia Nuraidah; 21–8, 19–21, 21–15	(Indonesia) Nisak Puji Lestari (Indonesia) Merisa Cindy Sahputri
September 28	Vietnam International Series; Da Nang, Vietnam; International Series $5,000 – 64MS/32WS/32MD/32WD/32XD	(Indonesia) Rian Swastedian (Indonesia) Masita Mahmudin; 21–13, 19–21, 21–17	(Malaysia) Tan Kian Meng (Malaysia) Peck Yen Wei

=== October ===
Week of	Tournament	Champions	Runners-up
October 5	Dutch Open; Almere, Netherlands; Grand Prix $50,000 – 64MS/32WS/32MD/32WD/32XD; Draw	(India) Ajay Jayaram; 21–12, 21–18	(Estonia) Raul Must
October 5	Dutch Open; Almere, Netherlands; Grand Prix $50,000 – 64MS/32WS/32MD/32WD/32XD; Draw	(Scotland) Kirsty Gilmour; 21–16, 21–13	(Germany) Karin Schnaase
October 5	Dutch Open; Almere, Netherlands; Grand Prix $50,000 – 64MS/32WS/32MD/32WD/32XD; Draw	(Malaysia) Koo Kien Keat (Malaysia) Tan Boon Heong; 21–15, 21–10	(India) Manu Attri (India) B. Sumeeth Reddy
October 5	Dutch Open; Almere, Netherlands; Grand Prix $50,000 – 64MS/32WS/32MD/32WD/32XD; Draw	(Bulgaria) Gabriela Stoeva (Bulgaria) Stefani Stoeva; 24–22, 21–15	(Netherlands) Eefje Muskens (Netherlands) Selena Piek
October 5	Dutch Open; Almere, Netherlands; Grand Prix $50,000 – 64MS/32WS/32MD/32WD/32XD; Draw	(France) Ronan Labar (France) Émilie Lefel; 21–10, 21–18	(Thailand) Sudket Prapakamol (Thailand) Saralee Thungthongkam
October 5	Argentina International; Neuquén, Argentina; International Series $5,000 – 32MS/32WS/32MD/32WD/32XD	(United States) Bjorn Seguin; 21–11, 21–13	(Mexico) Lino Munoz
October 5	Argentina International; Neuquén, Argentina; International Series $5,000 – 32MS/32WS/32MD/32WD/32XD	(Austria) Elisabeth Baldauf; 21–17, 14–6 Retired	(Brazil) Lohaynny Vicente
October 5	Argentina International; Neuquén, Argentina; International Series $5,000 – 32MS/32WS/32MD/32WD/32XD	(Mexico) Job Castillo (Mexico) Lino Muñoz; 21–10, 21–15	(Guatemala) Daniel Humblers (Chile) Bastian Lizama
October 5	Argentina International; Neuquén, Argentina; International Series $5,000 – 32MS/32WS/32MD/32WD/32XD	(Mexico) Haramara Gaitan (Mexico) Sabrina Solis; 21–7, 21–6	(Argentina) Florencia Bernatene (Argentina) Daiana Garmendia
October 5	Argentina International; Neuquén, Argentina; International Series $5,000 – 32MS/32WS/32MD/32WD/32XD	(Austria) David Obernosterer (Austria) Elisabeth Baldauf; Retired	(Brazil) Alex Yuwan Tjong (Brazil) Lohaynny Vicente
October 12	Chinese Taipei Masters; New Taipei City, Taiwan; Grand Prix $50,000 – 64MS/32WS/32MD/32WD/32XD; Draw	(Indonesia) Sony Dwi Kuncoro; 21–13, 21–15	(Chinese Taipei) Wang Tzu-wei
October 12	Chinese Taipei Masters; New Taipei City, Taiwan; Grand Prix $50,000 – 64MS/32WS/32MD/32WD/32XD; Draw	(South Korea) Lee Jang-mi; 21–16, 21–16	(South Korea) Kim Hyo-min
October 12	Chinese Taipei Masters; New Taipei City, Taiwan; Grand Prix $50,000 – 64MS/32WS/32MD/32WD/32XD; Draw	(Indonesia) Marcus Fernaldi Gideon (Indonesia) Kevin Sanjaya Sukamuljo; 21–12, 21–8	(Malaysia) Hoon Thien How (Malaysia) Lim Khim Wah
October 12	Chinese Taipei Masters; New Taipei City, Taiwan; Grand Prix $50,000 – 64MS/32WS/32MD/32WD/32XD; Draw	(Indonesia) Anggia Shitta Awanda (Indonesia) Ni Ketut Mahadewi Istarani; 21–19, 21–14	(Japan) Shiho Tanaka (Japan) Koharu Yonemoto
October 12	Chinese Taipei Masters; New Taipei City, Taiwan; Grand Prix $50,000 – 64MS/32WS/32MD/32WD/32XD; Draw	(Indonesia) Ronald Alexander (Indonesia) Melati Daeva Oktavianti; 21–18, 25–27, 21–15	(Chinese Taipei) Chang Ko-chi (Chinese Taipei) Chang Hsin-tien
October 12	Denmark Open; Odense, Denmark; Super Series Premier $650,000 – 32MS/32WS/32MD/32WD/32XD; Draw	(China) Chen Long; 21–12, 21–12	(Indonesia) Tommy Sugiarto
October 12	Denmark Open; Odense, Denmark; Super Series Premier $650,000 – 32MS/32WS/32MD/32WD/32XD; Draw	(China) Li Xuerui; 21–19, 21–12	(India) P. V. Sindhu
October 12	Denmark Open; Odense, Denmark; Super Series Premier $650,000 – 32MS/32WS/32MD/32WD/32XD; Draw	(South Korea) Lee Yong-dae (South Korea) Yoo Yeon-seong; 21–8, 21–14	(China) Liu Cheng (China) Lu Kai
October 12	Denmark Open; Odense, Denmark; Super Series Premier $650,000 – 32MS/32WS/32MD/32WD/32XD; Draw	(South Korea) Jung Kyung-eun (South Korea) Shin Seung-chan; Walkover	(China) Tian Qing (China) Zhao Yunlei
October 12	Denmark Open; Odense, Denmark; Super Series Premier $650,000 – 32MS/32WS/32MD/32WD/32XD; Draw	(South Korea) Ko Sung-hyun (South Korea) Kim Ha-na; 20–22, 21–18, 21–9	(Indonesia) Tontowi Ahmad (Indonesia) Liliyana Natsir
October 12	Chile International Challenge; Temuco, Chile; International Challenge $15,000 – 64MS/64WS/32MD/32WD/32XD	(Spain) Pablo Abián; 21–14, 21–17	(Spain) Ernesto Velázquez
October 12	Chile International Challenge; Temuco, Chile; International Challenge $15,000 – 64MS/64WS/32MD/32WD/32XD	(Turkey) Özge Bayrak; 21–15, 21–19	(Czech Republic) Kristína Gavnholt
October 12	Chile International Challenge; Temuco, Chile; International Challenge $15,000 – 64MS/64WS/32MD/32WD/32XD	(Canada) Adrian Liu (Canada) Derrick Ng; 21–13, 20–22, 21–15	(United States) Phillip Chew (United States) Sattawat Pongnairat
October 12	Chile International Challenge; Temuco, Chile; International Challenge $15,000 – 64MS/64WS/32MD/32WD/32XD	(United States) Eva Lee (United States) Paula Lynn Obañana; 21–17, 21–16	(Brazil) Lohaynny Vicente (Brazil) Luana Vicente
October 12	Chile International Challenge; Temuco, Chile; International Challenge $15,000 – 64MS/64WS/32MD/32WD/32XD	(United States) Phillip Chew (United States) Jamie Subandhi; 21–14, 21–14	(Brazil) Alex Yuwan Tjong (Brazil) Luana Vicente
October 12	Swiss International; Yverdon-les-Bains, Switzerland; International Challenge $15,000 – 32MS/32WS/32MD/32WD/32XD	(Malaysia) Iskandar Zulkarnain Zainuddin; 21–19, 16–21, 21–11	(Finland) Ville Lång
October 12	Swiss International; Yverdon-les-Bains, Switzerland; International Challenge $15,000 – 32MS/32WS/32MD/32WD/32XD	(Thailand) Nitchaon Jindapol; 16–21, 21–16, 21–14	(Germany) Olga Konon
October 12	Swiss International; Yverdon-les-Bains, Switzerland; International Challenge $15,000 – 32MS/32WS/32MD/32WD/32XD	(Malaysia) Koo Kien Keat (Malaysia) Tan Boon Heong; 18–21, 21–16, 21–16	(England) Peter Briggs (England) Tom Wolfenden
October 12	Swiss International; Yverdon-les-Bains, Switzerland; International Challenge $15,000 – 32MS/32WS/32MD/32WD/32XD	(Netherlands) Samantha Barning (Netherlands) Iris Tabeling; 21–11, 21–10	(Indonesia) Pia Zebadiah Bernadet (Indonesia) Aprilsasi Putri Lejarsar Variella
October 12	Swiss International; Yverdon-les-Bains, Switzerland; International Challenge $15,000 – 32MS/32WS/32MD/32WD/32XD	(Scotland) Robert Blair (Indonesia) Pia Zebadiah Bernadet; 18–21, 25–23, 21–18	(Thailand) Bodin Isara (Thailand) Savitree Amitrapai
October 12	Egypt International; Cairo, Egypt; Future Series; 32MS/32WS/32MD/16WD/32XD	(Uganda) Edwin Ekiring; 21–23, 25–23, 21–18	(Slovenia) Alen Roj
October 12	Egypt International; Cairo, Egypt; Future Series; 32MS/32WS/32MD/16WD/32XD	(Egypt) Hadia Hosny; 21–16, 24–26, 21–17	(Egypt) Doha Hany
October 12	Egypt International; Cairo, Egypt; Future Series; 32MS/32WS/32MD/16WD/32XD	(Malaysia) Ridzwan Rahmat (Malaysia) Misbun Shawal Misbun; 21–15, 15–21, 21–16	(Jordan) Bahaedeen Ahmad Al-shannik (Jordan) Mohd Naser Mansour Nayef
October 12	Egypt International; Cairo, Egypt; Future Series; 32MS/32WS/32MD/16WD/32XD	(Egypt) Doha Hany (Egypt) Hadia Hosny; 28–26, 21–13	(Egypt) Nadine Ashraf (Egypt) Menna El-Tanany
October 12	Egypt International; Cairo, Egypt; Future Series; 32MS/32WS/32MD/16WD/32XD	(Egypt) Ahmed Salah (Egypt) Menna El-Tanany; 21–18, 21–15	(Egypt) Abdelrahman Kashkal (Egypt) Hadia Hosny
October 19	French Open; Paris, France; Super Series $275,000 – 32MS/32WS/32MD/32WD/32XD; Draw	(Malaysia) Lee Chong Wei; 21–13, 21–18	(Chinese Taipei) Chou Tien-chen
October 19	French Open; Paris, France; Super Series $275,000 – 32MS/32WS/32MD/32WD/32XD; Draw	(Spain) Carolina Marín; 21–18, 21–10	(China) Wang Shixian
October 19	French Open; Paris, France; Super Series $275,000 – 32MS/32WS/32MD/32WD/32XD; Draw	(South Korea) Lee Yong-dae (South Korea) Yoo Yeon-seong; 21–14, 21–19	(Denmark) Mads Conrad-Petersen (Denmark) Mads Pieler Kolding
October 19	French Open; Paris, France; Super Series $275,000 – 32MS/32WS/32MD/32WD/32XD; Draw	(China) Huang Yaqiong (China) Tang Jinhua; 21–13, 21–16	(China) Luo Ying (China) Luo Yu
October 19	French Open; Paris, France; Super Series $275,000 – 32MS/32WS/32MD/32WD/32XD; Draw	(South Korea) Ko Sung-hyun (South Korea) Kim Ha-na; 21–10, 15–21, 21–19	(Indonesia) Praveen Jordan (Indonesia) Debby Susanto
October 19	Hatzor International; Hatzor, Israel; Future Series; 32MS/32WS/16MD/16WD/16XD	(England) Sam Parsons; 20–22, 21–8, 21–8	(Czech Republic) Lukáš Zevl
October 19	Hatzor International; Hatzor, Israel; Future Series; 32MS/32WS/16MD/16WD/16XD	(Czech Republic) Zuzana Pavelková; 21–18, 21–14	(England) Lydia Jane Powell
October 19	Hatzor International; Hatzor, Israel; Future Series; 32MS/32WS/16MD/16WD/16XD	(Israel) Alexander Bass (Israel) Daniel Chislov; 21–14, 23–21	(Israel) Leon Pugach (Israel) Aviv Sade
October 19	Hatzor International; Hatzor, Israel; Future Series; 32MS/32WS/16MD/16WD/16XD	(Israel) Alina Pugach (Israel) Yuval Pugach; 21–18, 22–20	(Israel) Dana Danilenko (Israel) Margeret Lurie
October 19	Hatzor International; Hatzor, Israel; Future Series; 32MS/32WS/16MD/16WD/16XD	(Israel) Ariel Shainski (Belarus) Krestina Silich; 21–10, 21–3	(Israel) Lior Kroyter (Israel) Dana Kugel
October 19	Brazil International; São Paulo, Brazil; International Series $5,000 – 32MS/32WS/32MD/32WD/32XD	(Brazil) Ygor Coelho; 21–18, 20–22, 21–19	(Guatemala) Kevin Cordón
October 19	Brazil International; São Paulo, Brazil; International Series $5,000 – 32MS/32WS/32MD/32WD/32XD	(Hungary) Laura Sárosi; 18–21, 21–18, 21–13	(Brazil) Fabiana Silva
October 19	Brazil International; São Paulo, Brazil; International Series $5,000 – 32MS/32WS/32MD/32WD/32XD	(Mexico) Job Castillo (Mexico) Lino Muñoz; 21–18, 21–14	(Brazil) Hugo Arthuso (Brazil) Daniel Paiola
October 19	Brazil International; São Paulo, Brazil; International Series $5,000 – 32MS/32WS/32MD/32WD/32XD	(Brazil) Lohaynny Vicente (Brazil) Luana Vicente; 21–9, 21–11	(Peru) Daniela Macías (Peru) Dánica Nishimura
October 19	Brazil International; São Paulo, Brazil; International Series $5,000 – 32MS/32WS/32MD/32WD/32XD	(Brazil) Hugo Arthuso (Brazil) Fabiana Silva; 21–15, 16–21, 21–19	(Austria) David Obernosterer (Austria) Elisabeth Baldauf
October 19	Morocco International; Casablanca, Morocco; International Series $5,000 – 32MS/32WS/32MD/16WD/32XD	(Portugal) Pedro Martins; 21–12, 21–14	(Uganda) Edwin Ekiring
October 19	Morocco International; Casablanca, Morocco; International Series $5,000 – 32MS/32WS/32MD/16WD/32XD	(Belgium) Lianne Tan; 15–21, 24–22, 21–8	(Finland) Nanna Vainio
October 19	Morocco International; Casablanca, Morocco; International Series $5,000 – 32MS/32WS/32MD/16WD/32XD	(Malaysia) Ridzwan Rahmat (Malaysia) Misbun Shawal Misbun; 21–18, 21–18	(Jordan) Bahaedeen Ahmad Al-shannik (Jordan) Mohd Naser Mansour Nayef
October 19	Morocco International; Casablanca, Morocco; International Series $5,000 – 32MS/32WS/32MD/16WD/32XD	(Latvia) Ieva Pope (Latvia) Kristīne Šefere; 23–21, 21–13	(Jordan) Domou Amro (Jordan) Mazahreh Leina Fehmi
October 19	Morocco International; Casablanca, Morocco; International Series $5,000 – 32MS/32WS/32MD/16WD/32XD	(France) Vincent Espen (France) Manon Krieger; 21–12, 18–21, 21–17	(Jordan) Bahaedeen Ahmad Al-shannik (Jordan) Domou Amro
October 26	Bitburger Open; Saarbrücken, Germany; Grand Prix Gold $120,000 – 64MS/32WS/32MD/32WD/32XD; Draw	(Hong Kong) Ng Ka Long; 21–12, 21–13	(Hong Kong) Wong Wing Ki
October 26	Bitburger Open; Saarbrücken, Germany; Grand Prix Gold $120,000 – 64MS/32WS/32MD/32WD/32XD; Draw	(Japan) Akane Yamaguchi; 16-21, 21–14, 21-13	(Thailand) Busanan Ongbamrungphan
October 26	Bitburger Open; Saarbrücken, Germany; Grand Prix Gold $120,000 – 64MS/32WS/32MD/32WD/32XD; Draw	(Denmark) Mads Conrad-Petersen (Denmark) Mads Pieler Kolding; 21–18, 21–18	(Russia) Vladimir Ivanov (Russia) Ivan Sozonov
October 26	Bitburger Open; Saarbrücken, Germany; Grand Prix Gold $120,000 – 64MS/32WS/32MD/32WD/32XD; Draw	(China) Tang Yuanting (China) Yu Yang; 21–10, 21–18	(Hong Kong) Poon Lok Yan (Hong Kong) Tse Ying Suet
October 26	Bitburger Open; Saarbrücken, Germany; Grand Prix Gold $120,000 – 64MS/32WS/32MD/32WD/32XD; Draw	(Poland) Robert Mateusiak (Poland) Nadieżda Zięba; 21–18, 21–17	(England) Chris Adcock (England) Gabby Adcock
October 26	New Caledonia International; Nouméa, New Caledonia; International Series $5,000 – 32MS/32WS/32MD/32WD/32XD	(United States) Howard Shu; 21–9, 21–19	(Chinese Taipei) Yang Chih-hsun
October 26	New Caledonia International; Nouméa, New Caledonia; International Series $5,000 – 32MS/32WS/32MD/32WD/32XD	(Italy) Jeanine Cicognini; 21–17, 21–15	(Australia) Joy Lai
October 26	New Caledonia International; Nouméa, New Caledonia; International Series $5,000 – 32MS/32WS/32MD/32WD/32XD	(Australia) Anthony Joe (Australia) Pit Seng Low; 21–15, 21–12	(New Zealand) Maoni Hu He (New Zealand) Shane Masinipeni
October 26	New Caledonia International; Nouméa, New Caledonia; International Series $5,000 – 32MS/32WS/32MD/32WD/32XD	(New Caledonia) Johanna Kou (New Zealand) Maria Masinipeni; 21–11, 21–13	(New Caledonia) Julie Derne (New Caledonia) Cecilia Moussy
October 26	New Caledonia International; Nouméa, New Caledonia; International Series $5,000 – 32MS/32WS/32MD/32WD/32XD	(New Zealand) Shane Masinipeni (New Zealand) Maria Masinipeni; 21–10, 21–13	(New Caledonia) Loic Mennesson (New Caledonia) Johanna Kou
October 26	Bahrain International; Isa Town, Bahrain; International Series $5,000 – 64MS/32WS/16MD/8WD/32XD	(India) Sameer Verma; 21–13, 18–21, 21–8	(India) Pratul Joshi
October 26	Bahrain International; Isa Town, Bahrain; International Series $5,000 – 64MS/32WS/16MD/8WD/32XD	(Malaysia) Yang Li Lian; 21–19, 21–17	(India) Saili Rane
October 26	Bahrain International; Isa Town, Bahrain; International Series $5,000 – 64MS/32WS/16MD/8WD/32XD	(Malaysia) Tan Wee Tat (Malaysia) Tan Yip Jiun; 18–21, 21–11, 21–16	(Malaysia) Chow Pak Chuu (Malaysia) Yeoh Kay Ee
October 26	Bahrain International; Isa Town, Bahrain; International Series $5,000 – 64MS/32WS/16MD/8WD/32XD	(India) Poorvisha S. Ram (India) Arathi Sara Sunil; 21–14, 21–8	(Pakistan) Palwasha Bashir (Pakistan) Sara Mohmand
October 26	Bahrain International; Isa Town, Bahrain; International Series $5,000 – 64MS/32WS/16MD/8WD/32XD	(Malaysia) Tan Yip Jiun (Malaysia) Yang Li Lian; 21–17, 21–10	(Uzbekistan) Artyom Savatyugin (Belarus) Alesia Zaitsava
October 26	Hungarian International; Budapest, Hungary; International Series $5,000 – 32MS/32WS/24MD/24WD/24XD	(Finland) Kalle Koljonen; 19–21, 21–17, 21–15	(Denmark) Rasmus Messerschmidt
October 26	Hungarian International; Budapest, Hungary; International Series $5,000 – 32MS/32WS/24MD/24WD/24XD	(Indonesia) Aprilia Yuswandari; 21–19, 21–9	(England) Chloe Birch
October 26	Hungarian International; Budapest, Hungary; International Series $5,000 – 32MS/32WS/24MD/24WD/24XD	(Scotland) Martin Campbell (Scotland) Patrick MacHugh; 21–13, 18–21, 21–16	(Denmark) Søren Gravholt (Denmark) Nikolaj Overgaard
October 26	Hungarian International; Budapest, Hungary; International Series $5,000 – 32MS/32WS/24MD/24WD/24XD	(Malaysia) Cheah Yee See (Malaysia) Chin Kah Mun; 21–14, 22–20	(Denmark) Alexandra Bøje (Denmark) Gabriella Bøje
October 26	Hungarian International; Budapest, Hungary; International Series $5,000 – 32MS/32WS/24MD/24WD/24XD	(England) Christopher Coles (England) Victoria Williams; 21–19, 11–21, 21–17	(Denmark) Patrick Buhl (Denmark) Isabella Nielsen

=== November ===
Week of	Tournament	Champions	Runners-up
November 2	Bahrain International Challenge; Isa Town, Bahrain; International Challenge $15,000 – 64MS/32WS/32MD/16WD/32XD	(India) Sameer Verma; 21–14, 21–10	(Singapore) Derek Wong Zi Liang
November 2	Bahrain International Challenge; Isa Town, Bahrain; International Challenge $15,000 – 64MS/32WS/32MD/16WD/32XD	(Thailand) Nichaon Jindapon; 24–22, 21–10	(India) Saili Rane
November 2	Bahrain International Challenge; Isa Town, Bahrain; International Challenge $15,000 – 64MS/32WS/32MD/16WD/32XD	(Thailand) Bodin Issara (Thailand) Nipitphon Puangpuapech; 21–9, 21–14	(Thailand) Wannawat Ampunsuwan (Thailand) Tinn Isriyanate
November 2	Bahrain International Challenge; Isa Town, Bahrain; International Challenge $15,000 – 64MS/32WS/32MD/16WD/32XD	(Thailand) Savitree Amitrapai (Thailand) Pacharapun Chochuwong; 21–6, 15–21, 21–16	(Thailand) Chaladchalam Chayanit (Thailand) Phataimas Muenwong
November 2	Bahrain International Challenge; Isa Town, Bahrain; International Challenge $15,000 – 64MS/32WS/32MD/16WD/32XD	(Thailand) Bodin Issara (Thailand) Savitree Amitrapai; 21–17, 21–19	(Singapore) Danny Bawa Chrisnanta (Singapore) Vanessa Neo Yu Yan
November 2	Korea Masters; Jeonju, South Korea; Grand Prix Gold $50,000 – 64MS/32WS/32MD/32WD/32XD; Draw	(South Korea) Lee Dong-keun; 17–21, 21–14, 21–14	(South Korea) Lee Hyun-il
November 2	Korea Masters; Jeonju, South Korea; Grand Prix Gold $50,000 – 64MS/32WS/32MD/32WD/32XD; Draw	(Japan) Sayaka Sato; 22–20, 21–19	(China) Sun Yu
November 2	Korea Masters; Jeonju, South Korea; Grand Prix Gold $50,000 – 64MS/32WS/32MD/32WD/32XD; Draw	(South Korea) Kim Gi-jung (South Korea) Kim Sa-rang; 16–21, 21–18, 21–19	(South Korea) Ko Sung-hyun (South Korea) Shin Baek-cheol
November 2	Korea Masters; Jeonju, South Korea; Grand Prix Gold $50,000 – 64MS/32WS/32MD/32WD/32XD; Draw	(South Korea) Chang Ye-na (South Korea) Lee So-hee; 21–7, 16–21, 21–19	(South Korea) Jung Kyung-eun (South Korea) Shin Seung-chan
November 2	Korea Masters; Jeonju, South Korea; Grand Prix Gold $50,000 – 64MS/32WS/32MD/32WD/32XD; Draw	(South Korea) Ko Sung-hyun (South Korea) Kim Ha-na; 19–21, 21–17, 21–19	(South Korea) Shin Baek-cheol (South Korea) Chae Yoo-jung
November 2	World Junior Championships; Lima, Peru; Suhandinata Cup	China; 3–0	Indonesia
November 9	China Open; Fuzhou, China; Super Series Premier $700,000 – 32MS/32WS/32MD/32WD/32XD; Draw	(Malaysia) Lee Chong Wei; 21–15, 21–11	(China) Chen Long
November 9	China Open; Fuzhou, China; Super Series Premier $700,000 – 32MS/32WS/32MD/32WD/32XD; Draw	(China) Li Xuerui; 21–12, 21–15	(India) Saina Nehwal
November 9	China Open; Fuzhou, China; Super Series Premier $700,000 – 32MS/32WS/32MD/32WD/32XD; Draw	(South Korea) Kim Gi-jung (South Korea) Kim Sa-rang; 21–13, 21–19	(China) Chai Biao (China) Hong Wei
November 9	China Open; Fuzhou, China; Super Series Premier $700,000 – 32MS/32WS/32MD/32WD/32XD; Draw	(China) Tang Yuanting (China) Yu Yang; 18–21, 21–13, 21–12	(Japan) Misaki Matsutomo (Japan) Ayaka Takahashi
November 9	China Open; Fuzhou, China; Super Series Premier $700,000 – 32MS/32WS/32MD/32WD/32XD; Draw	(China) Zhang Nan (China) Zhao Yunlei; 21–19, 17–21, 21–19	(Denmark) Joachim Fischer Nielsen (Denmark) Christinna Pedersen
November 9	World Junior Championships; Lima, Peru; BWF Major Event; 64MS/32WS/32MD/32WD/32XD; Draw	(Chinese Taipei) Lu Chia-hung; 17–21, 21–10, 21–7	(India) Siril Verma
November 9	World Junior Championships; Lima, Peru; BWF Major Event; 64MS/32WS/32MD/32WD/32XD; Draw	(Malaysia) Goh Jin Wei; 21–15, 21–16	(Malaysia) Lee Ying Ying
November 9	World Junior Championships; Lima, Peru; BWF Major Event; 64MS/32WS/32MD/32WD/32XD; Draw	(China) He Jiting (China) Zheng Siwei; 21–14, 21–16	(Denmark) Joel Eipe (Denmark) Federik Sogaard Mortensen
November 9	World Junior Championships; Lima, Peru; BWF Major Event; 64MS/32WS/32MD/32WD/32XD; Draw	(China) Chen Qingchen (China) Jia Yifan; 21–18, 13–21, 21–11	(China) Du Yue (China) Li Yinhui
November 9	World Junior Championships; Lima, Peru; BWF Major Event; 64MS/32WS/32MD/32WD/32XD; Draw	(China) Zheng Siwei (China) Chen Qingchen; 21–19, 21–8	(China) He Jiting (China) Du Yue
November 9	Malaysia International; Alor Setar, Kedah, Malaysia; International Challenge $15,000 – 64MS/32WS/32MD/32WD/32XD	(Thailand) Khosit Phetpradab; 21–14, 21–10	(Malaysia) Soong Joo Ven
November 9	Malaysia International; Alor Setar, Kedah, Malaysia; International Challenge $15,000 – 64MS/32WS/32MD/32WD/32XD	(Singapore) Liang Xiaoyu; 21–11, 21–13	(Indonesia) Dinar Dyah Ayustine
November 9	Malaysia International; Alor Setar, Kedah, Malaysia; International Challenge $15,000 – 64MS/32WS/32MD/32WD/32XD	(Chinese Taipei) Lin Chia-yu (Chinese Taipei) Wu Hsiao-lin; 17–21, 21–16, 21–18	(Chinese Taipei) Lee Jhe-huei (Chinese Taipei) Lee Yang
November 9	Malaysia International; Alor Setar, Kedah, Malaysia; International Challenge $15,000 – 64MS/32WS/32MD/32WD/32XD	(Indonesia) Della Destiara Haris (Indonesia) Rosyita Eka Putri Sari; 21–18, 21–12	(Thailand) Chaladchalam Chayanit (Thailand) Phataimas Muenwong
November 9	Malaysia International; Alor Setar, Kedah, Malaysia; International Challenge $15,000 – 64MS/32WS/32MD/32WD/32XD	(Thailand) Bodin Issara (Thailand) Savitree Amitrapai; 21–13, 21–6	(Indonesia) Hafiz Faisal (Indonesia) Shella Devi Aulia
November 9	Puerto Rico International; San Juan, Puerto Rico; International Series $5,000 – 32MS/32WS/8MD/4WD/8XD	(Guatemala) Kevin Cordón; 21–17, 21–15	(United States) Howard Shu
November 9	Puerto Rico International; San Juan, Puerto Rico; International Series $5,000 – 32MS/32WS/8MD/4WD/8XD	(Hungary) Laura Sarosi; 21–12, 21–16	(Italy) Jeanine Cicognini
November 9	Puerto Rico International; San Juan, Puerto Rico; International Series $5,000 – 32MS/32WS/8MD/4WD/8XD	(Mexico) Job Castillo (Mexico) Lino Munoz; 21–19, 22–20	(Czech Republic) Jan Fröhlich (Slovakia) Matej Hlinican
November 9	Puerto Rico International; San Juan, Puerto Rico; International Series $5,000 – 32MS/32WS/8MD/4WD/8XD	(Mexico) Haramara Gaitan (Mexico) Sabrina Solis; 21–12, 21–15	(Brazil) Ana Paula Campos (Brazil) Fabiana Silva
November 9	Puerto Rico International; San Juan, Puerto Rico; International Series $5,000 – 32MS/32WS/8MD/4WD/8XD	(Brazil) Alex Yuwan Tjong (Brazil) Lohaynny Vicente; 21–12, 18–21, 25–23	(Brazil) Daniel Paiola (Brazil) Fabiana Silva
November 9	Norwegian International; Sandefjord, Norway; International Series $5,000 – 32MS/32WS/32MD/32WD/32XD	(Norway) Marius Myhre; 21–19, 21–15	(Denmark) Patrick Bjerregaard
November 9	Norwegian International; Sandefjord, Norway; International Series $5,000 – 32MS/32WS/32MD/32WD/32XD	(Denmark) Sofie Holmboe Dahl; 21–13, 21–12	(Estonia) Kati Tolmoff
November 9	Norwegian International; Sandefjord, Norway; International Series $5,000 – 32MS/32WS/32MD/32WD/32XD	(Denmark) Soren Gravholt (Denmark) Nikolaj Overgaard; 23–21, 21–17	(Sweden) Richard Eidestedt (Sweden) Andy Hartono Tandaputra
November 9	Norwegian International; Sandefjord, Norway; International Series $5,000 – 32MS/32WS/32MD/32WD/32XD	(Australia) Setyana Mapasa (Australia) Gronya Somerville; 21–5, 21–13	(Denmark) Amanda Madsen (Denmark) Isabella Nielsen
November 9	Norwegian International; Sandefjord, Norway; International Series $5,000 – 32MS/32WS/32MD/32WD/32XD	(Australia) Sawan Serasinghe (Australia) Setyana Mapasa; 21–17, 21–15	(Denmark) Soren Gravholt (Denmark) Maiken Fruergaard
November 16	Hong Kong Open; Kowloon, Hong Kong; Super Series $275,000 – 32MS/32WS/32MD/32WD/32XD; Draw	(Malaysia) Lee Chong Wei; 21–16, 21–15	(China) Tian Houwei
November 16	Hong Kong Open; Kowloon, Hong Kong; Super Series $275,000 – 32MS/32WS/32MD/32WD/32XD; Draw	(Spain) Carolina Marín; 21–17, 18–21, 22–20	(Japan) Nozomi Okuhara
November 16	Hong Kong Open; Kowloon, Hong Kong; Super Series $275,000 – 32MS/32WS/32MD/32WD/32XD; Draw	(South Korea) Lee Yong-dae (South Korea) Yoo Yeon-seong; 21–7, 18–21, 21–18	(Denmark) Mathias Boe (Denmark) Carsten Mogensen
November 16	Hong Kong Open; Kowloon, Hong Kong; Super Series $275,000 – 32MS/32WS/32MD/32WD/32XD; Draw	(China) Tian Qing (China) Zhao Yunlei; 21–15, 21–12	(China) Tang Yuanting (China) Yu Yang
November 16	Hong Kong Open; Kowloon, Hong Kong; Super Series $275,000 – 32MS/32WS/32MD/32WD/32XD; Draw	(China) Zhang Nan (China) Zhao Yunlei; 21–17, 17–21, 21–17	(China) Liu Cheng (China) Bao Yixin
November 16	Suriname International; Paramaribo, Suriname; International Series $5,000 – 32MS/32WS/16MD/16WD/32XD	(Cuba) Osleni Guerrero; 21–11, 21–16	(United States) Howard Shu
November 16	Suriname International; Paramaribo, Suriname; International Series $5,000 – 32MS/32WS/16MD/16WD/32XD	(Portugal) Telma Santos; No match	(Brazil) Lohaynny Vicente
November 16	Suriname International; Paramaribo, Suriname; International Series $5,000 – 32MS/32WS/16MD/16WD/32XD	(Mexico) Job Castillo (Mexico) Lino Munoz; No match	(Italy) Giovanni Greco (Italy) Rosario Maddaloni
November 16	Suriname International; Paramaribo, Suriname; International Series $5,000 – 32MS/32WS/16MD/16WD/32XD	(Mexico) Haramara Gaitan (Mexico) Sabrina Solis; No match	(Brazil) Ana Paula Campos (Brazil) Fabiana Silva
November 16	Suriname International; Paramaribo, Suriname; International Series $5,000 – 32MS/32WS/16MD/16WD/32XD	(Germany) Jonathan Persson (Brazil) Ana Paula Campos; 21–9, 21–15	(Suriname) Dylan Darmohoetomo (Suriname) Jill Sjauw Mook
November 16	Scottish Open; Glasgow, Scotland; Grand Prix $50,000 – 64MS/32WS/32MD/32WD/32XD; Draw	(Denmark) Hans-Kristian Vittinghus; 21–19, 11–21, 21–16	(England) Rajiv Ouseph
November 16	Scottish Open; Glasgow, Scotland; Grand Prix $50,000 – 64MS/32WS/32MD/32WD/32XD; Draw	(Denmark) Line Kjaersfeldt; 16–21, 21–16, 21–18	(Scotland) Kirsty Gilmour
November 16	Scottish Open; Glasgow, Scotland; Grand Prix $50,000 – 64MS/32WS/32MD/32WD/32XD; Draw	(Germany) Michael Fuchs (Germany) Johannes Schöttler; 21–15, 21–18	(England) Andrew Ellis (England) Peter Mills
November 16	Scottish Open; Glasgow, Scotland; Grand Prix $50,000 – 64MS/32WS/32MD/32WD/32XD; Draw	(Japan) Yuki Fukushima (Japan) Sayaka Hirota; 21–14, 14–11 Retired	(Netherlands) Samantha Barning (Netherlands) Iris Tabeling
November 16	Scottish Open; Glasgow, Scotland; Grand Prix $50,000 – 64MS/32WS/32MD/32WD/32XD; Draw	(Russia) Vitalij Durkin (Russia) Nina Vislova; 21–14, 21–12	(France) Ronan Labar (France) Emilie Lefel
November 16	Finnish International; Helsinki, Finland; International Series $5,000 – 32MS/32WS/32MD/32WD/32XD	(Denmark) Steffen Rasmussen; 21–14, 21–17	(Denmark) Kasper Dinesen
November 16	Finnish International; Helsinki, Finland; International Series $5,000 – 32MS/32WS/32MD/32WD/32XD	(Indonesia) Febby Angguni; 18–21, 21–10, 21–8	(Denmark) Sofie Holmboe Dahl
November 16	Finnish International; Helsinki, Finland; International Series $5,000 – 32MS/32WS/32MD/32WD/32XD	(Russia) Nikita Khakimov (Russia) Vasily Kuznetsov; 21–16, 9–21, 21–17	(Denmark) Nicklas Mathiasen (Denmark) Lasse Moelhede
November 16	Finnish International; Helsinki, Finland; International Series $5,000 – 32MS/32WS/32MD/32WD/32XD	(Sweden) Clara Nistad (Sweden) Emma Wengberg; 21–16, 22–20	(Netherlands) Alida Chen (Netherlands) Cheryl Seinen
November 16	Finnish International; Helsinki, Finland; International Series $5,000 – 32MS/32WS/32MD/32WD/32XD	(Sweden) Filip Michael Duwall Myhren (Sweden) Emma Wengberg; 13–21, 22–20, 21–15	(Denmark) Kristoffer Knudsen (Denmark) Emilie Juul Moller
November 23	Brasil Open; Rio de Janeiro, Brazil; Grand Prix $50,000 – 64MS/32WS/32MD/32WD/32XD; Draw	(China) Lin Dan; 21–13, 21–17	(Spain) Pablo Abián
November 23	Brasil Open; Rio de Janeiro, Brazil; Grand Prix $50,000 – 64MS/32WS/32MD/32WD/32XD; Draw	(China) Shen Yaying; 20–22, 21–17, 24–22	(China) Li Yun
November 23	Brasil Open; Rio de Janeiro, Brazil; Grand Prix $50,000 – 64MS/32WS/32MD/32WD/32XD; Draw	(China) Huang Kaixiang (China) Zheng Siwei; 22–24, 21–10, 21–14	(China) Wang Yilu (China) Zhang Wen
November 23	Brasil Open; Rio de Janeiro, Brazil; Grand Prix $50,000 – 64MS/32WS/32MD/32WD/32XD; Draw	(China) Chen Qingchen (China) Jia Yifan; 21–17, 21–14	(Netherlands) Eefje Muskens (Netherlands) Selena Piek
November 23	Brasil Open; Rio de Janeiro, Brazil; Grand Prix $50,000 – 64MS/32WS/32MD/32WD/32XD; Draw	(China) Zheng Siwei (China) Chen Qingchen; 21–12, 21–10	(Russia) Evgenij Dremin (Russia) Evgenia Dimova
November 23	Macau Open; Macau; Grand Prix Gold $120,000 – 64MS/32WS/32MD/32WD/32XD; Draw	(South Korea) Jeon Hyeok-jin; 21–11, 13–21, 23–21	(China) Tian Houwei
November 23	Macau Open; Macau; Grand Prix Gold $120,000 – 64MS/32WS/32MD/32WD/32XD; Draw	(India) Pusarla Venkata Sindhu; 24–22, 21–11	(Japan) Minatsu Mitani
November 23	Macau Open; Macau; Grand Prix Gold $120,000 – 64MS/32WS/32MD/32WD/32XD; Draw	(South Korea) Ko Sung-hyun (South Korea) Shin Baek-cheol; 22–20, 21–14	(Indonesia) Berry Angriawan (Indonesia) Rian Agung Saputro
November 23	Macau Open; Macau; Grand Prix Gold $120,000 – 64MS/32WS/32MD/32WD/32XD; Draw	(South Korea) Jung Kyung-eun (South Korea) Shin Seung-chan; 18–21, 15–15 Retired	(Hong Kong) Poon Lok Yan (Hong Kong) Tse Ying Suet
November 23	Macau Open; Macau; Grand Prix Gold $120,000 – 64MS/32WS/32MD/32WD/32XD; Draw	(South Korea) Shin Baek-cheol (South Korea) Chae Yoo-jung; 21–18, 21–13	(South Korea) Choi Sol-kyu (South Korea) Eom Hye-won
November 23	Welsh International; Cardiff, Wales; International Challenge $15,000 – 32MS/32WS/32MD/32WD/32XD	(Russia) Vladimir Malkov; 21–13, 21–17	(Poland) Adrian Dziolko
November 23	Welsh International; Cardiff, Wales; International Challenge $15,000 – 32MS/32WS/32MD/32WD/32XD	(Denmark) Anna Thea Madsen; 24–22, 21–11	(Germany) Karin Schnaase
November 23	Welsh International; Cardiff, Wales; International Challenge $15,000 – 32MS/32WS/32MD/32WD/32XD	(England) Marcus Ellis (England) Chris Langridge; 21–16, 16–21, 21–16	(Poland) Adam Cwalina (Poland) Przemysław Wacha
November 23	Welsh International; Cardiff, Wales; International Challenge $15,000 – 32MS/32WS/32MD/32WD/32XD	(Bulgaria) Gabriela Stoeva (Bulgaria) Stefani Stoeva; 21–10, 22–20	(England) Heather Olver (England) Lauren Smith
November 23	Welsh International; Cardiff, Wales; International Challenge $15,000 – 32MS/32WS/32MD/32WD/32XD	(England) Matthew Nottingham (England) Emily Westwood; 21–13, 25–23	(France) Ronan Labar (France) Emilie Lefel
November 23	Zambia International; Lusaka, Zambia; International Series $5,000 – 32MS/32WS/32MD/32WD/32XD	(Iran) Vatannejad-Soroush Eskandari; 21–19, 14–21, 21–19	(Italy) Indra Bagus Ade Chandra
November 23	Zambia International; Lusaka, Zambia; International Series $5,000 – 32MS/32WS/32MD/32WD/32XD	(Mauritius) Kate Foo Kune; 15–21, 1–0 Retired	(Iran) Sorayya Aghaei
November 23	Zambia International; Lusaka, Zambia; International Series $5,000 – 32MS/32WS/32MD/32WD/32XD	(South Africa) Andries Malan (South Africa) Willem Viljoen; 21–14, 21–15	(Egypt) Ali Ahmed El Khateeb (Egypt) Abdelrahman Kashkal
November 23	Zambia International; Lusaka, Zambia; International Series $5,000 – 32MS/32WS/32MD/32WD/32XD	(Egypt) Nadine Ashraf (Egypt) Menna Eltanany; No match	(Iran) Negin Amiripour (Iran) Sorayya Aghaei
November 23	Zambia International; Lusaka, Zambia; International Series $5,000 – 32MS/32WS/32MD/32WD/32XD	(Egypt) Abdelrahman Kashkal (Egypt) Hadia Hosny; 21–15, 21–8	(Zambia) Juma Muwowo (Zambia) Ogar Siamupangila
November 30	Bangladesh International; Dhaka, Bangladesh; International Challenge $15,000 – 64MS/32WS/32MD/32WD/32XD	(India) B. Sai Praneeth; 21–14, 8–21, 21–17	(India) Sameer Verma
November 30	Bangladesh International; Dhaka, Bangladesh; International Challenge $15,000 – 64MS/32WS/32MD/32WD/32XD	(India) Gadde Ruthvika Shivani; 23–21, 19–21, 21–18	(United States) Iris Wang
November 30	Bangladesh International; Dhaka, Bangladesh; International Challenge $15,000 – 64MS/32WS/32MD/32WD/32XD	(India) Pranav Chopra (India) Akshay Dewalkar; 21–16, 21–16	(Malaysia) Tan Chee Tean (Malaysia) Tan Wee Gieen
November 30	Bangladesh International; Dhaka, Bangladesh; International Challenge $15,000 – 64MS/32WS/32MD/32WD/32XD	(Thailand) Chaladchalam Chayanit (Thailand) Phataimas Muenwong; 21–15, 21–19	(Malaysia) Lim Yin Loo (Malaysia) Lee Meng Yean
November 30	Bangladesh International; Dhaka, Bangladesh; International Challenge $15,000 – 64MS/32WS/32MD/32WD/32XD	(Singapore) Terry Hee Yong Kai (Singapore) Tan Wei Han; 21–10, 19–21, 21–12	(Malaysia) Tan Wee Gieen (Malaysia) Lai Shevon Jemie
November 30	USA International; Orlando, Florida, United States; International Challenge $15,000 – 64MS/32WS/32MD/32WD/32XD	(Denmark) Emil Holst; 21–16, 22–20	(Belgium) Yuhan Tan
November 30	USA International; Orlando, Florida, United States; International Challenge $15,000 – 64MS/32WS/32MD/32WD/32XD	(United States) Zhang Beiwen; 21–14, 13–21, 21–19	(Chinese Taipei) Pai Yu-po
November 30	USA International; Orlando, Florida, United States; International Challenge $15,000 – 64MS/32WS/32MD/32WD/32XD	(Chinese Taipei) Lin Chia-yu (Chinese Taipei) Wu Hsiao-lin; 16–21, 23–21, 21–19	(Germany) Michael Fuchs (Germany) Johannes Schöttler
November 30	USA International; Orlando, Florida, United States; International Challenge $15,000 – 64MS/32WS/32MD/32WD/32XD	(England) Heather Olver (England) Lauren Smith; 18–21, 21–19, 21–19	(Thailand) Puttita Supajirakul (Thailand) Sapsiree Taerattanachai
November 30	USA International; Orlando, Florida, United States; International Challenge $15,000 – 64MS/32WS/32MD/32WD/32XD	(Germany) Michael Fuchs (Germany) Birgit Michels; 21–16, 21–17	(Singapore) Danny Bawa Chrisnanta (Singapore) Vanessa Neo Yu Yan
November 30	Indonesian Masters; Malang, East Java, Indonesia; Grand Prix Gold $120,000 – 64MS/32WS/32MD/32WD/32XD; Draw	(Indonesia) Tommy Sugiarto; 17–21, 21–13, 24–22	(India) Srikanth Kidambi
November 30	Indonesian Masters; Malang, East Java, Indonesia; Grand Prix Gold $120,000 – 64MS/32WS/32MD/32WD/32XD; Draw	(China) He Bingjiao; 21–18, 21–9	(China) Chen Yufei
November 30	Indonesian Masters; Malang, East Java, Indonesia; Grand Prix Gold $120,000 – 64MS/32WS/32MD/32WD/32XD; Draw	(Indonesia) Berry Angriawan (Indonesia) Rian Agung Saputro; 21–11, 22–20	(China) Chai Biao (China) Hong Wei
November 30	Indonesian Masters; Malang, East Java, Indonesia; Grand Prix Gold $120,000 – 64MS/32WS/32MD/32WD/32XD; Draw	(China) Tang Yuanting (China) Yu Yang; 21–17, 21–11	(Indonesia) Nitya Krishinda Maheswari (Indonesia) Greysia Polii
November 30	Indonesian Masters; Malang, East Java, Indonesia; Grand Prix Gold $120,000 – 64MS/32WS/32MD/32WD/32XD; Draw	(Indonesia) Tontowi Ahmad (Indonesia) Liliyana Natsir; 21–18, 21–13	(Indonesia) Praveen Jordan (Indonesia) Debby Susanto
November 30	Irish Open; Dublin, Ireland; International Challenge $15,000 – 32MS/32WS/32MD/32WD/32XD	(Denmark) Anders Antonsen; 21–18, 22–20	(France) Lucas Claerbout
November 30	Irish Open; Dublin, Ireland; International Challenge $15,000 – 32MS/32WS/32MD/32WD/32XD	(Germany) Olga Konon; 21–17, 21–16	(Denmark) Natalia Koch Rohde
November 30	Irish Open; Dublin, Ireland; International Challenge $15,000 – 32MS/32WS/32MD/32WD/32XD	(Germany) Raphael Beck (Germany) Peter Kaesbauer; 21–16, 21–18	(Poland) Adam Cwalina (Poland) Przemysław Wacha
November 30	Irish Open; Dublin, Ireland; International Challenge $15,000 – 32MS/32WS/32MD/32WD/32XD	(Bulgaria) Gabriela Stoeva (Bulgaria) Stefani Stoeva; 21–10, 22–24, 21–9	(Denmark) Julie Finne-Ipsen (Denmark) Rikke S. Hansen
November 30	Irish Open; Dublin, Ireland; International Challenge $15,000 – 32MS/32WS/32MD/32WD/32XD	(Denmark) Mathias Christiansen (Denmark) Lena Grebak; 19–21, 21–18, 21–18	(Poland) Robert Mateusiak (Poland) Nadieżda Zięba
November 30	South Africa International; Cape Town, South Africa; International Series $5,000 – 64MS/32WS/32MD/32WD/32XD	(United States) Howard Shu; 21–11, 21–16	(Turkey) Emre Vural
November 30	South Africa International; Cape Town, South Africa; International Series $5,000 – 64MS/32WS/32MD/32WD/32XD	(Portugal) Telma Santos; 22–20, 21–17	(Hungary) Laura Sarosi
November 30	South Africa International; Cape Town, South Africa; International Series $5,000 – 64MS/32WS/32MD/32WD/32XD	(Iran) Vatannejad-Soroush Eskandari (Iran) Farzin Khanjani; 17–21, 21–16, 21–18	(South Africa) Andries Malan (South Africa) Willem Viljoen
November 30	South Africa International; Cape Town, South Africa; International Series $5,000 – 64MS/32WS/32MD/32WD/32XD	(Turkey) Cemre Fere (Turkey) Ebru Yazgan; 21–16, 21–15	(South Africa) Stacey Doubell (South Africa) Jade Kraemer
November 30	South Africa International; Cape Town, South Africa; International Series $5,000 – 64MS/32WS/32MD/32WD/32XD	(South Africa) Andries Malan (South Africa) Jennifer Fry; 12–21, 21–19, 21–18	(Egypt) Abdelrahman Kashkal (Egypt) Hadia Hosny

=== December ===
Week of	Tournament	Champions	Runners-up
December 7	U.S. Grand Prix; Orange County, California, United States; Grand Prix $50,000 – 64MS/32WS/32MD/32WD/32XD; Draw	(South Korea) Lee Hyun-il; 21-19, 21-12	(England) Rajiv Ouseph
December 7	U.S. Grand Prix; Orange County, California, United States; Grand Prix $50,000 – 64MS/32WS/32MD/32WD/32XD; Draw	(Chinese Taipei) Pai Yu-po; 18-21, 21–15, 21-15	(Scotland) Kirsty Gilmour
December 7	U.S. Grand Prix; Orange County, California, United States; Grand Prix $50,000 – 64MS/32WS/32MD/32WD/32XD; Draw	(Malaysia) Goh V Shem (Malaysia) Tan Wee Kiong; 21–14, 21–17	(Russia) Vladimir Ivanov (Russia) Ivan Sozonov
December 7	U.S. Grand Prix; Orange County, California, United States; Grand Prix $50,000 – 64MS/32WS/32MD/32WD/32XD; Draw	(South Korea) Jung Kyung-eun (South Korea) Shin Seung-chan; 24–22, 18–21, 21–12	(South Korea) Chang Ye-na (South Korea) Lee So-hee
December 7	U.S. Grand Prix; Orange County, California, United States; Grand Prix $50,000 – 64MS/32WS/32MD/32WD/32XD; Draw	(South Korea) Choi Sol-gyu (South Korea) Eom Hye-won; 21–12, 21–14	(Germany) Michael Fuchs (Germany) Birgit Michels
December 7	XV Italian International; Milan, Italy; International Challenge $15,000 – 32MS/32WS/32MD/32WD/32XD; Draw	(France) Brice Leverdez; 21-17, 14–21, 26-24	(Germany) Marc Zwiebler
December 7	XV Italian International; Milan, Italy; International Challenge $15,000 – 32MS/32WS/32MD/32WD/32XD; Draw	(Denmark) Natalia Koch Rohde; 21-18, 16–21, 21-15	(Germany) Olga Konon
December 7	XV Italian International; Milan, Italy; International Challenge $15,000 – 32MS/32WS/32MD/32WD/32XD; Draw	(Denmark) Kasper Antonsen (Denmark) Niclas Nøhr; 24-22, 21-14	(Denmark) Mathias Christiansen (Denmark) David Daugaard
December 7	XV Italian International; Milan, Italy; International Challenge $15,000 – 32MS/32WS/32MD/32WD/32XD; Draw	(Bulgaria) Gabriela Stoeva (Bulgaria) Stefani Stoeva; 21-19, 18–21, 13-6 Retired	(Australia) Setyana Mapasa (Australia) Gronya Somerville
December 7	XV Italian International; Milan, Italy; International Challenge $15,000 – 32MS/32WS/32MD/32WD/32XD; Draw	(Denmark) Niclas Nohr (Denmark) Sara Thygesen; 21-10, 17–21, 21-19	(England) Matthew Nottingham (England) Emily Westwood
December 7	BWF Destination Dubai World Super Series Finals; Dubai, UAE; BWF Super Series Finals $1,000,000 – 8MS (RR)/8WS (RR)/8MD (RR)/8WD (RR)/8XD (RR); Draw	(Japan) Kento Momota; 21-15, 21-12	(Denmark) Viktor Axelsen
December 7	BWF Destination Dubai World Super Series Finals; Dubai, UAE; BWF Super Series Finals $1,000,000 – 8MS (RR)/8WS (RR)/8MD (RR)/8WD (RR)/8XD (RR); Draw	(Japan) Nozomi Okuhara; 22-20, 21-18	(China) Wang Yihan
December 7	BWF Destination Dubai World Super Series Finals; Dubai, UAE; BWF Super Series Finals $1,000,000 – 8MS (RR)/8WS (RR)/8MD (RR)/8WD (RR)/8XD (RR); Draw	(Indonesia) Mohammad Ahsan (Indonesia) Hendra Setiawan; 13–21, 21–14, 21–14	(China) Chai Biao (China) Hong Wei
December 7	BWF Destination Dubai World Super Series Finals; Dubai, UAE; BWF Super Series Finals $1,000,000 – 8MS (RR)/8WS (RR)/8MD (RR)/8WD (RR)/8XD (RR); Draw	(China) Luo Ying (China) Luo Yu; 14–21, 21–9, 14–4 Retired	(Denmark) Christinna Pedersen (Denmark) Kamilla Rytter Juhl
December 7	BWF Destination Dubai World Super Series Finals; Dubai, UAE; BWF Super Series Finals $1,000,000 – 8MS (RR)/8WS (RR)/8MD (RR)/8WD (RR)/8XD (RR); Draw	(England) Chris Adcock (England) Gabby Adcock; 21–14, 21–17	(South Korea) Ko Sung-hyun (South Korea) Kim Ha-na
December 7	TATA Open India International Challenge 2015; Mumbai, India; International Challenge $15,000 – 32MS/32WS/32MD/32WD/32XD; Draw	(India) Sameer Verma; 21–11, 21–18	(India) Sourabh Varma
December 7	TATA Open India International Challenge 2015; Mumbai, India; International Challenge $15,000 – 32MS/32WS/32MD/32WD/32XD; Draw	(Thailand) Pornpawee Chochuwong; 16–21, 21–11, 21–15	(Malaysia) Tee Jing Yi
December 7	TATA Open India International Challenge 2015; Mumbai, India; International Challenge $15,000 – 32MS/32WS/32MD/32WD/32XD; Draw	(Thailand) Wannawat Ampunsuwan (Thailand) Tinn Isriyanet; 21–14, 21–9	(India) Pranav Chopra (India) Akshay Dewalkar
December 7	TATA Open India International Challenge 2015; Mumbai, India; International Challenge $15,000 – 32MS/32WS/32MD/32WD/32XD; Draw	(Thailand) Chayanit Chaladchalam (Thailand) Phataimas Muenwong; 21-11, 15–21, 21-13	(India) K. Maneesha (India) N. Sikki Reddy
December 7	TATA Open India International Challenge 2015; Mumbai, India; International Challenge $15,000 – 32MS/32WS/32MD/32WD/32XD; Draw	(India) Satwiksairaj Rankireddy (India) K. Maneesha; 21–13, 21–16	(India) Arun Vishnu (India) Aparna Balan
December 7	Botswana International; Gaborone, Botswana; International Series $5,000 – 32MS/32WS/16MD/8WD/8XD	(United States) Howard Shu; 21-14, 21-11	(Italy) Rosario Maddaloni
December 7	Botswana International; Gaborone, Botswana; International Series $5,000 – 32MS/32WS/16MD/8WD/8XD	(Hungary) Laura Sárosi; 21-10, 21–14	(Mauritius) Kate Foo Kune
December 7	Botswana International; Gaborone, Botswana; International Series $5,000 – 32MS/32WS/16MD/8WD/8XD	(South Africa) Andries Malan (South Africa) Willem Viljoen; 21–11, 21–8	(Algeria) Mohamed Abderrahime Belarbi (Algeria) Adel Hamek
December 7	Botswana International; Gaborone, Botswana; International Series $5,000 – 32MS/32WS/16MD/8WD/8XD	(Nigeria) Grace Gabriel (Zambia) Ogar Siamupangila; 21–11, 21–17	(Zambia) Elizaberth Chipeleme (Zambia) Ngandwe Miyambo
December 7	Botswana International; Gaborone, Botswana; International Series $5,000 – 32MS/32WS/16MD/8WD/8XD	(Egypt) Abdelrahman Kashkal (Egypt) Hadia Hosny; 22-20, 21–14	(Zambia) Juma Muwowo (Zambia) Ogar Siamupangila
December 14	Mexico Open Grand Prix; Distrito Federal, Mexico; Grand Prix $50,000 – 64MS/32WS/32MD/32WD/32XD; Draw	(South Korea) Lee Dong-keun; 19-21, 21–13, 21-12	(Thailand) Pannawit Thongnuam
December 14	Mexico Open Grand Prix; Distrito Federal, Mexico; Grand Prix $50,000 – 64MS/32WS/32MD/32WD/32XD; Draw	(Japan) Sayaka Sato; 21-15, 21-9	(South Korea) Bae Yeon-ju
December 14	Mexico Open Grand Prix; Distrito Federal, Mexico; Grand Prix $50,000 – 64MS/32WS/32MD/32WD/32XD; Draw	(India) Manu Attri (India) B. Sumeeth Reddy; 22-20, 21-18	(Thailand) Bodin Isara (Thailand) Nipitphon Phuangphuapet
December 14	Mexico Open Grand Prix; Distrito Federal, Mexico; Grand Prix $50,000 – 64MS/32WS/32MD/32WD/32XD; Draw	(Japan) Shizuka Matsuo (Japan) Mami Naito; 21-17, 16–21, 21-10	(Thailand) Puttita Supajirakul (Thailand) Sapsiree Taerattanachai
December 14	Mexico Open Grand Prix; Distrito Federal, Mexico; Grand Prix $50,000 – 64MS/32WS/32MD/32WD/32XD; Draw	(Malaysia) Chan Peng Soon (Malaysia) Goh Liu Ying; 21-14, 21-12	(South Korea) Choi Sol-gyu (South Korea) Eom Hye-won
December 14	Mersin Turkey International; Mersin, Turkey; International Challenge $15,000 – 32MS/32WS/32MD/32WD/32XD; Draw	(Germany) Marc Zwiebler; 21-8, 15–21, 21-7	(India) Harsheel Dani
December 14	Mersin Turkey International; Mersin, Turkey; International Challenge $15,000 – 32MS/32WS/32MD/32WD/32XD; Draw	(Germany) Karin Schnaase; 21-17, 21-5	(Estonia) Kati Tolmoff
December 14	Mersin Turkey International; Mersin, Turkey; International Challenge $15,000 – 32MS/32WS/32MD/32WD/32XD; Draw	(Denmark) Kasper Antonsen (Denmark) Niclas Nøhr; 21–16, 21–15	(Poland) Adam Cwalina (Poland) Przemysław Wacha
December 14	Mersin Turkey International; Mersin, Turkey; International Challenge $15,000 – 32MS/32WS/32MD/32WD/32XD; Draw	(Bulgaria) Gabriela Stoeva (Bulgaria) Stefani Stoeva; 21–19, 21–12	(Turkey) Özge Bayrak (Turkey) Neslihan Yiğit
December 14	Mersin Turkey International; Mersin, Turkey; International Challenge $15,000 – 32MS/32WS/32MD/32WD/32XD; Draw	(Poland) Robert Mateusiak (Poland) Nadieżda Zięba; 21–12, 21–13	(Australia) Matthew Chau (Australia) Gronya Somerville

== See also ==
- BWF World Ranking
