= Elizaberth Chipeleme =

Zambian badminton player (born 1992)

Personal information
- Born: 4 August 1992 (age 34)
- Height: 1.74 m (5 ft 9 in)
- Weight: 56 kg (123 lb)

Sport
- Country: Zambia
- Sport: Badminton

Women's
- Highest ranking: 249 (WS) 20 Oct 2016; 490 (WD) 6 Oct 2016; 198 (XD) 6 Oct 2016
- BWF profile
Medal record
Women's badminton
Representing Zambia
African Championships
Bronze medal – third place	2017 Benoni	Mixed team

Elizaberth Chipeleme (born 4 August 1992) is a Zambian badminton player.

== Career ==
In 2013, she represented University of Zambia compete at the Summer Universiade in Kazan, Russia. She was the runner-up at the 2015 Botswana International tournament in the women's doubles event teamed-up with Ngandwe Miyambo. They were defeated by Ogar Siamupangila and Grace Gabriel in the straight sets. The pair were runners-up at the 2016 Zambia International tournament, and semifinalists at the 2016 Botswana International. In the mixed doubles event, she was partnered with Topsy Phiri, and they were finalists at the 2016 Ethiopia International tournament. She was also the women's singles finalist at the Top 16 Badminton Championship in Lusaka. In the final, she was defeated by Ngandwe Miyambo in straight sets. Chipeleme was a part of the Zambian team to win bronze at the 2017 African Badminton Championships.

== Achievements ==
=== BWF International Challenge/Series (3 runners-up) ===
Women's doubles
Year	Tournament	Partner	Opponent	Score	Result
2016	Zambia International	(Zambia) Ngandwe Miyambo	(Zambia) Evelyn Siamupangila (Zambia) Ogar Siamupangila	Walkover	(silver) Runner-up
2015	Botswana International	(Zambia) Ngandwe Miyambo	(Nigeria) Grace Gabriel (Zambia) Ogar Siamupangila	11–21, 17–21	(silver) Runner-up

Mixed doubles
Year	Tournament	Partner	Opponent	Score	Result
2016	Ethiopia International	(Zambia) Topsy Phiri	(Egypt) Ahmed Salah (Egypt) Menna Eltanany	15–21, 9–21	(silver) Runner-up

BWF International Challenge tournament
BWF International Series tournament
BWF Future Series tournament
