= Grace Gabriel =

Nigerian badminton player (born 1988)

Personal information
- Born: 25 June 1988 (age 38) Jos, Nigeria
- Height: 1.68 m (5 ft 6 in)

Sport
- Country: Nigeria
- Sport: Badminton
- Handedness: Right
- Coached by: Irwansyah Aboy; Ronald Wetzel

Women's singles & doubles
- Highest ranking: 63 (WS 23 September 2015); 97 (WD 12 July 2012)
- BWF profile
Medal record
Women's badminton
Representing Nigeria
All-Africa Games
Gold medal – first place	2007 Algiers	Mixed team
Gold medal – first place	2011 Maputo	Mixed team
Silver medal – second place	2011 Maputo	Women's singles
Silver medal – second place	2015 Brazzaville	Women's singles
Bronze medal – third place	2015 Brazzaville	Women's doubles
Bronze medal – third place	2015 Brazzaville	Mixed team
African Championships
Gold medal – first place	2012 Addis Ababa	Women's singles
Gold medal – first place	2013 Rose Hill	Women's singles
Silver medal – second place	2011 Marrakesh	Mixed team
Silver medal – second place	2013 Rose Hill	Mixed team
Silver medal – second place	2014 Gaborone	Women's singles
Silver medal – second place	2014 Gaborone	Mixed team
Bronze medal – third place	2011 Marrakesh	Women's singles
Bronze medal – third place	2011 Marrakesh	Mixed doubles
Bronze medal – third place	2020 Cairo	Women's doubles
Africa Team Championships
Silver medal – second place	2012 Addis Ababa	Women's team
Bronze medal – third place	2010 Kampala	Women's team

Grace Gabriel Ofodile (born 25 June 1988) is a Nigerian badminton player. She won the women's singles title at the 2012 and 2013 African Championships. Gabriel also won the women's singles silver medal at the 2011 and 2015 African Games.

== Career ==
She won the silver medal in the women's singles at the 2011 All-Africa Games. She became the runner-up in the women's singles event at the 2014 African Badminton Championships. She won second place at the 2015 All Africa Games.

In September 2013, it was reported that she was one of the 14 players selected for the Road to Rio Program, a program that aimed to help African badminton players to compete at the 2016 Olympic Games.

She studied at Fontys University of Applied Sciences and lives in the Netherlands.

== Achievements ==
=== All-Africa Games ===
Women's singles
Year	Venue	Opponent	Score	Result
2015	Gymnase Étienne Mongha, Brazzaville, Republic of the Congo	(Mauritius) Kate Foo Kune	13–21, 19–21	Silver
2011	Escola Josina Machel, Maputo, Mozambique	(Nigeria) Susan Ideh	16–21, 19–21	Silver

Women's doubles
Year	Venue	Partner	Opponent	Score	Result
2015	Gymnase Étienne Mongha; Brazzaville, Republic of the Congo	(Nigeria) Maria Braimoh	(Seychelles) Juliette Ah-Wan (Seychelles) Allisen Camille	13–21, 16–21	Bronze

=== African Championships ===
Women's singles
Year	Venue	Opponent	Score	Result
2014	Lobatse Stadium, Gaborone, Botswana	(Mauritius) Kate Foo Kune	14–21, 21–14, 17–21	Silver
2013	National Badminton Centre, Rose Hill, Mauritius	(Mauritius) Kate Foo Kune	25–23, 21–12	Gold
2012	Arat Kilo Hall, Addis Ababa, Ethiopia	(Nigeria) Fatima Azeez	21–19, 14–21, 21–16	Gold
2011	Marrakesh, Morocco	(South Africa) Kerry-Lee Harrington	18–21, 15–21	Bronze

Women's doubles
Year	Venue	Partner	Opponent	Score	Result
2020	Cairo Stadium Hall 2 Cairo, Egypt	(Nigeria) Chineye Ibere	(Egypt) Doha Hany (Egypt) Hadia Hosny	13–21, 12–21	Bronze

Mixed doubles
Year	Venue	Partner	Opponent	Score	Result
2011	Marrakesh, Morocco	(Nigeria) Enejoh Abah	(South Africa) Willem Viljoen (South Africa) Annari Viljoen	13–21, 8–21	Bronze

=== BWF International Challenge/Series (8 titles, 12 runners-up) ===
Women's singles
Year	Tournament	Opponent	Score	Result
2013	Kenya International	(Uganda) Shamim Bangi	21–8, 15–21, 21–18	(gold) Winner
2013	Mauritius International	(Mauritius) Kate Foo Kune	18–21, 21–16, 22–24	(silver) Runner-up
2014	Kenya International	(Italy) Jeanine Cicognini	16–21, 21–13, 16–21	(silver) Runner-up
2014	Ethiopia International	(Egypt) Hadia Hosny	11–6, 11–7, 11–9	(gold) Winner
2014	Nigeria International	(Switzerland) Nicole Schaller	8–11, 3–11, 11–7, 11–10, 6–11	(silver) Runner-up
2014	Zambia International	(Mauritius) Kate Foo Kune	16–21, 17–21	(silver) Runner-up
2014	Botswana International	(Egypt) Hadia Hosny	21–15, 21–13	(gold) Winner
2015	Ethiopia International	(Turkey) Cemre Fere	11–21, 20–22	(silver) Runner-up
2015	Nigeria International	(Mauritius) Kate Foo Kune	14–21, 21–11, 21–12	(gold) Winner

Women's doubles
Year	Tournament	Partner	Opponent	Score	Result
2013	Uganda International	(Mauritius) Shama Aboobakar	(Uganda) Shamim Bangi (Uganda) Margaret Nankabirwa	21–13, 18–21, 21–12	(gold) Winner
2013	Kenya International	(Nigeria) Dorcas Ajoke Adesokan	(Uganda) Shamim Bangi (Uganda) Margaret Nankabirwa	21–18, 21–9	(gold) Winner
2013	Mauritius International	(Nigeria) Dorcas Ajoke Adesokan	(South Africa) Elme de Villiers (South Africa) Sandra Le Grange	15–21, 16–21	(silver) Runner-up
2013	Botswana International	(Mauritius) Yeldie Louison	(South Africa) Elme de Villiers (Serbia) Sandra Halilovic	13–21, 16–21	(silver) Runner-up
2014	Zambia International	(Mauritius) Kate Foo Kune	(South Africa) Michelle Butler-Emmett (South Africa) Elme de Villiers	17–21, 21–19, 17–21	(silver) Runner-up
2014	Botswana International	(South Africa) Elme de Villiers	(Uganda) Shamim Bangi (Zambia) Ogar Siamupangila	21–17, 18–21, 21–18	(gold) Winner
2015	Mauritius International	(Zambia) Ogar Siamupangila	(Iran) Negin Amiripour (Iran) Aghaei Hajiagha Soraya	26–28, 14–21	(silver) Runner-up
2015	Nigeria International	(Nigeria) Braimoh Maria	(Turkey) Cemre Fere (Turkey) Ebru Yazgan	14–21, 14–21	(silver) Runner-up
2015	Botswana International	(Zambia) Ogar Siamupangila	(Zambia) Elizaberth Chipeleme (Zambia) Ngandwe Miyambo	21–11, 21–17	(gold) Winner
2016	Uganda International	(Zambia) Ogar Siamupangila	(Turkey) Cemre Fere (Turkey) Ebru Yazgan	16–21, 17–21	(silver) Runner-up
2023	Benin International	(Nigeria) Ramatu Yakubu	(Uganda) Husina Kobugabe (Uganda) Gladys Mbabazi	22–20, 21–23, 18–21	(silver) Runner-up

BWF International Challenge tournament
BWF International Series tournament
BWF Future Series tournament
