= Menna El-Tanany =

Egyptian badminton player (born 1990)

Personal information
- Born: 19 September 1990 (age 36) Cairo, Egypt
- Height: 1.65 m (5 ft 5 in)

Sport
- Country: Egypt
- Sport: Badminton
- Handedness: Right

Women's singles & doubles
- Highest ranking: 133 (WS 19 May 2016); 41 (WD 17 November 2016); 79 (XD 12 November 2015)
- BWF profile
Medal record
Women's badminton
Representing Egypt
African Championships
Gold medal – first place	2017 Benoni	Mixed team
Bronze medal – third place	2017 Benoni	Women's singles
Bronze medal – third place	2017 Benoni	Mixed doubles
Africa Team Championships
Silver medal – second place	2016 Rose Hill	Women's team
Bronze medal – third place	2012 Addis Ababa	Women's team

Menna El-Tanany (born 19 September 1990) is an Egyptian badminton player. She was part of the national team that won the mixed team title in 2017 African Championships.

== Achievements ==
=== African Championships ===
Women's singles
Year	Venue	Opponent	Score	Result
2017	John Barrable Hall; Benoni, South Africa	(Mauritius) Kate Foo Kune	14–21, 6–21	Bronze

Mixed doubles
Year	Venue	Partner	Opponent	Score	Result
2017	John Barrable Hall; Benoni, South Africa	(Egypt) Ahmed Salah	(Mauritius) Julien Paul (Mauritius) Kate Foo Kune	19–21, 15–21	Bronze

=== BWF International Challenge/Series (8 titles, 6 runners-up) ===
Women's singles
Year	Tournament	Opponent	Score	Result
2016	Ethiopia International	(Zambia) Ogar Siamupangila	10–21, 21–18, 21–18	(gold) Winner
2016	Egypt International	(Lithuania) Gerda Voitechovskaja	14–21, 15–21	(silver) Runner-up
2016	Zambia International	(Zambia) Ogar Siamupangila	21–13, 21–17	(gold) Winner

Women's doubles
Year	Tournament	Partner	Opponent	Score	Result
2015	Ethiopia International	(Egypt) Nadine Ashraf	(Turkey) Cemre Fere (Turkey) Ebru Yazgan	10–21, 9–21	(silver) Runner-up
2015	Egypt International	(Egypt) Nadine Ashraf	(Egypt) Doha Hany (Egypt) Hadia Hosny	26–28, 13–21	(silver) Runner-up
2015	Zambia International	(Egypt) Nadine Ashraf	(Iran) Negin Amiripour (Iran) Sorayya Aghaei	No match	(gold) Winner
2016	Egypt International	(Egypt) Nadine Ashraf	(Belarus) Kristina Silich (Lithuania) Gerda Voitechovskaja	21–17, 17–21, 7–21	(silver) Runner-up

Mixed doubles
Year	Tournament	Partner	Opponent	Score	Result
2015	Ethiopia International	(Egypt) Ahmed Salah	(Egypt) Ali Ahmed El-Khateeb (Egypt) Doha Hany	21–15, 21–16	(gold) Winner
2015	Egypt International	(Egypt) Ahmed Salah	(Egypt) Abdelrahman Kashkal (Egypt) Hadia Hosny	21–18, 21–15	(gold) Winner
2016	Ethiopia International	(Egypt) Ahmed Salah	(Zambia) Topsy Phiri (Zambia) Elizaberth Chipeleme	21–15, 21–9	(gold) Winner
2016	Egypt International	(Egypt) Ahmed Salah	(Belarus) Uladzimir Varantsou (Belarus) Kristina Silich	21–14, 21–10	(gold) Winner
2016	Zambia International	(Egypt) Ahmed Salah	(Zambia) Juma Muwowo (Zambia) Ogar Siamupangila	21–7, 15–21, 21–18	(gold) Winner
2017	Uganda International	(Egypt) Ahmed Salah	(Jordan) Bahaedeen Ahmad Alshannik (Jordan) Domou Amro	21–16, 12–21, 19–21	(silver) Runner-up
2017	Egypt International	(Egypt) Ahmed Salah	(Malaysia) Yogendran Khrishnan (India) Prajakta Sawant	15–21, 13–21	(silver) Runner-up

BWF International Challenge tournament
BWF International Series tournament
BWF Future Series tournament
