= Misha Zilberman =

Israeli badminton player (born 1989)

Misha Zilberman Миша Зильберман מישה זילברמן
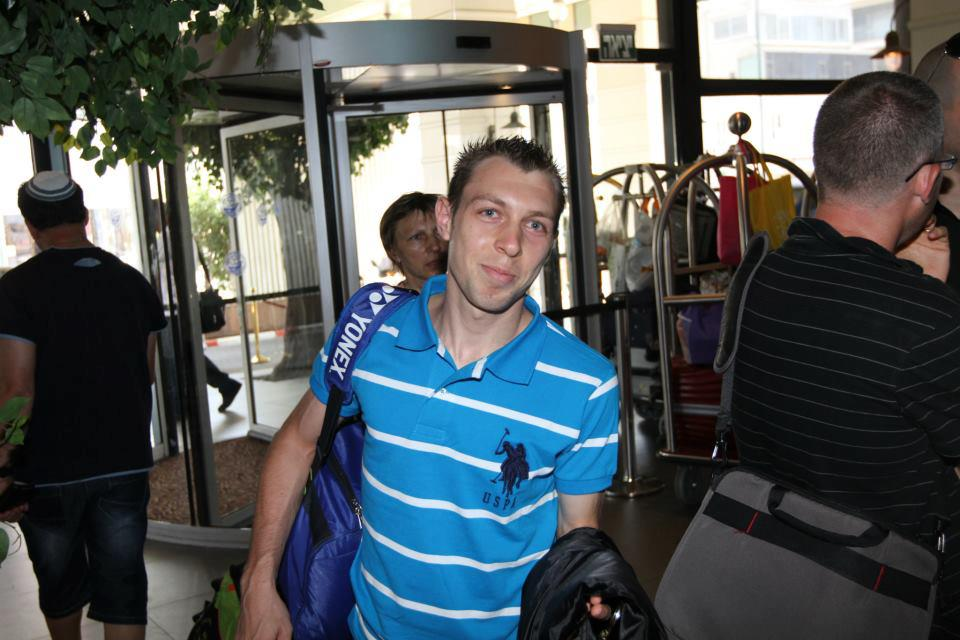
- Zilberman in 2012

Personal information
- Born: 30 January 1989 (age 37) Moscow, Russian SFSR, Soviet Union
- Height: 1.71 m (5 ft 7 in)
- Weight: 62 kg (137 lb)

Sport
- Country: Israel
- Sport: Badminton
- Handedness: Right
- Coached by: Svetlana Zilberman; Michael Zilberman

Men's singles
- Career record: 340 wins, 285 losses
- Highest ranking: 33 (18 July 2023)
- Current ranking: 75 (30 June 2026)
- BWF profile
Medal record
Men's badminton
Representing Israel
European Games
Bronze medal – third place	2019 Minsk	Men's singles
Bronze medal – third place	2023 Kraków–Małopolska	Men's singles
European Championships
Bronze medal – third place	2022 Madrid	Men's singles
BWF WORLD TOUR
Bronze medal – third place	2014 US OPEN	Men's singles
Bronze medal – third place	2016 Brazil OPEN	Men's singles
Bronze medal – third place	2022 Canada OPEN	Men's singles
Maccabiah Games
Gold medal – first place	2013 Modiin	Men's singles
Gold medal – first place	2013 Modiin	Mixed doubles
Gold medal – first place	2017 Jerusalem	Men's singles
Gold medal – first place	2017 Jerusalem	Mixed doubles
- Mother: Svetlana Zilberman
- Website: mishazilberman.22web.org

Misha Zilberman (Russian: Миша Зильберман; Hebrew: מישה זילברמן; born 25 January 1989) is an Israeli badminton player. He competed for Israel at the 2012, 2016, 2020 and 2024 Olympics, coming in 33rd, 14th, 15th and 27th respectively. He is the first Israeli player to win a medal at the European Badminton Championships. He won a bronze medal at the 2022 European Badminton Championships, and bronze medals at the 2019 and 2023 European Games.

== Early and personal life ==
Zilberman was born in Moscow, Soviet Russia. He is an only child of his father, Michael, and his mother, Svetlana Zilberman. His father was born in Russia in 1945, and immigrated to Israel in 1991, with his wife and son Misha. He worked in Pardes Hannah, and then in Rishon LeZion.

Svetlana was born in Belarus in 1958. She began playing badminton at the age of 12, which is how she met Michael, who was her coach.

Both of his parents come from athletic backgrounds. His father was a member of the Soviet national floor gymnastics team, until he retired as the result of an injury. He then became the coach to the Soviet national badminton team. Svetlana competes in professional badminton. Her greatest accomplishment was winning a bronze medal in the 1986 European Badminton Championships for the USSR. He describes his mother as "the most important person in my career, the inspiration for my whole life."

Zilberman served in the Israel Defense Forces from August 2007 to August 2010. He lives in Ness Ziona, Israel. He also studied towards a bachelor's degree in mathematics at Tel Aviv University for two years.

== Education ==
Zilberman pursued academic studies in physical education and sports management alongside the development of his career as a competitive badminton player.

From 2016 to 2020, he studied for a bachelor's degree in physical education at Givat Washington Academic College of Education. He completed his studies in 2020 with a grade average of 96. His studies in physical education provided him with academic training in physical activity and sports.

From 2020 to 2022, he studied for a Master of business administration (MBA), specializing in sports management, at Ono Academic College. He completed his studies in 2022 with a grade average of 91. His studies combined business management with the world of sports, including organizational management, strategic planning, marketing, and business development.

In his youth, Zilberman studied mathematics at Tel Aviv University. According to an interview published on the website of the Olympic Committee of Israel in December 2019, he was admitted to the university at the age of 13 and studied there for two years, but discontinued his studies to focus on his badminton career.

== Career ==
As to his approach to competing in badminton, Zilberman said: "I think about what the opponent playing in front of me will do against me. I must have in my performance arsenal an answer to every move of my opponent, better than what he expects."

=== Early years ===
When he was still a baby, Zilberman used to join his mother at her badminton practice, and with time he began playing himself. At the age of 12 he began his serious daily training. He began to compete in junior badminton tournaments in 2003. His club is Kfar Maccabiah. He is coached by both his parents, as his mother coaches him, and his father is head coach of Israel's national badminton team.

Zilberman won the senior Israeli Badminton Championship when he was 16 years old, in 2004. In 2006 and 2009 he played mixed doubles with his mother at the Badminton World Championships, as the Championships' first mother-son mixed doubles team.

=== 2009–13; 2012 Olympic Games ===
In 2009, Zilberman first played mixed doubles with his mother, in the world championships. His mother is also his coach. He said that their relationship on court is "like any mixed doubles players," as they discuss how to improve and win the match, but that off the court "she is my coach, so there is no discussion."

In 2011, Zilberman competed for six months for the Odense badminton club in the professional league in Denmark. In April 2012 he reached the finals of the Tahiti Air Nui International, improving his world ranking by 14 places. In 2012, he won the Israeli Badminton Championship in both singles and mixed doubles (with his mother). In May 2012 he was ranked # 64 internationally.

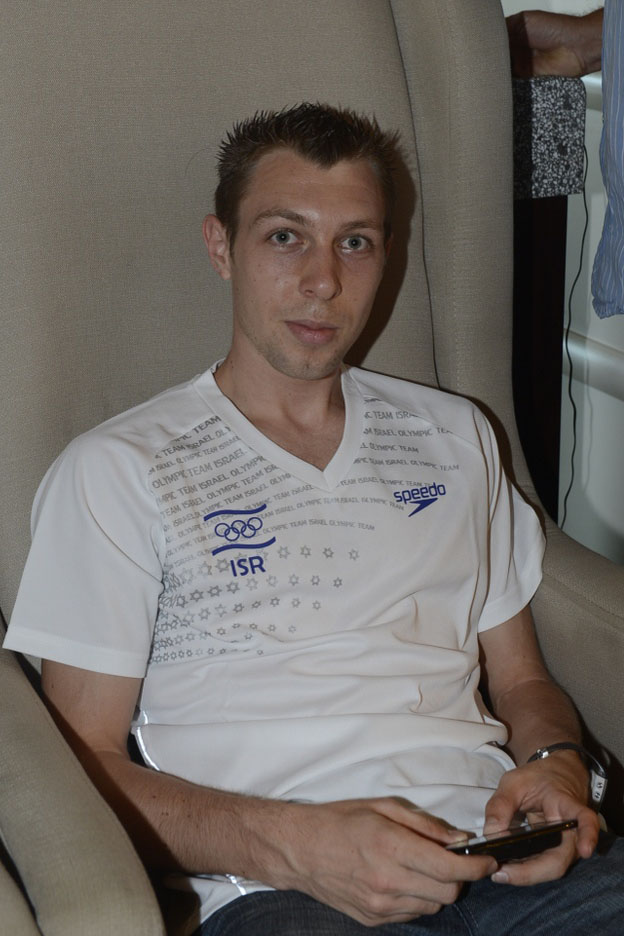
Misha Zilberman (2012)

Zilberman competed for Israel at the 2012 Summer Olympics in London, the first appearance by an Israeli badminton player in the Olympics. Ranked 33rd in the Olympic rankings in singles, he came in 33rd in the Games.

In July 2013, Zilberman won two gold medals at the 2013 Maccabiah Games, one in singles, one in mixed doubles with his mother. In May 2015, he competed in mixed doubles with his mother, who was 56 years old, at the 2015 Sudirman Cup in Dongguan, China.

=== 2014–15; Lagos and Ethiopia titles ===
In May 2014, Zilberman won the 37th Israel Badminton Championship in Kibbutz Hatzur, without dropping a set. It was the sixth year in a row that he won the title. He also won the mixed doubles title, with his mother Svetlana.

In June 2014 he won the gold medal in the Lagos International in Nigeria, winning 60% of the points he played. In October 2014, Zilberman then won the Ethiopia International, winning 68% of the points he played. In December 2014, he won a bronze medal in the US Open.

In 2015, Zilberman won the gold medal in the Ethiopia International in September, without losing a game.

Zilberman represented Israel at the 2015 European Games in badminton in men's singles. He lost in the round of 16 to Zvonimir Đurkinjak of Croatia in three sets.

=== 2016–19; 2016 Olympic Games; European Games bronze medal ===
In 2016 Zilberman won the gold medal in the Suriname International in November, winning all five of his matches, and in doubles he and his mother won the gold medal after winning all four of their matches.

Zilberman competed for Israel at the 2016 Summer Olympics in badminton. Zilberman garnered Israel's first-ever win in Olympic badminton, beating Yuhan Tan of Belgium 22-20 and 22–12, but went 1–1 in his group and did not advance to the next round. Misha ranked 26th in the Olympic rankings in singles, and came in 14th at the Olympic Games.

Zilberman won a gold medal at the 2017 Maccabiah Games in singles, and another in mixed doubles with his mother.

In 2017 Zilberman won the gold medal in the Ethiopia International in September, winning all 10 of his games, and won the mixed doubles gold medal with his mother without losing a game.

In 2018 he won the gold medal at the Lagos International in July. In 2019 Zilberman won the gold medal in the 34th Brazil International Challenge in May, winning all 10 of his games, and defeating Brian Yang of Canada in the final, and won the bronze medal in the 2019 European Games in Minsk, Belarus, in June, won the silver medal in the Lagos International in July, and won the bronze medal in the US Championship in December.

=== 2020–23; 2020 Olympic Games; European Games and European Championships bronze medals ===
Zilberman competed for Israel at the 2020 Summer Olympics in 2021 in Tokyo in badminton, in what was his third Olympics. He came in 14th at the Olympic Games, after he defeated world # 15, and 2019 world championship bronze medalist, Sai Praneeth Bhamidipati of India in straight games (he remarked: "Definitely this is the biggest win of my career"), but was defeated by world # 19 Mark Caljouw in three games. He said: "I’m playing smarter and more tactical. When I was young I used to be play a more physical game. Now I’m playing tactical, and I play fewer shots, but creating greater pressure."

At the 2022 European Badminton Championships in Madrid, Spain, in April, Zilberman won a bronze medal as he defeated Luka Ban of Croatia, Kari Gunnarson of Iceland, Mark Caljouw of the Netherlands (ranked # 26 in the world), and 2018 European Championship bronze medalist Brice Leverdez of France in the quarterfinals, before losing to 2020 Olympic champion Viktor Axelsen of Denmark in the semi-finals.

Zilberman won the XII Santo Domingo Open 2022 in June, winning 10 of the 11 games he played.

At the BWF World Championships 2022 in August, Zilberman partnered in doubles with his mother who at the age of 64 years old became the oldest player to win a match in competition history. The two of them defeated Egyptian Olympians Adham Hatem Elgamal/Doha Hany. The next-youngest badminton player before her on the list was 38 years old.

At the 2023 European Games in Poland, Zilberman won five straight matches before losing in the semi-finals to Christo Popov of France, winning a bronze medal.

=== 2024–present; 2024 Olympic Games ===
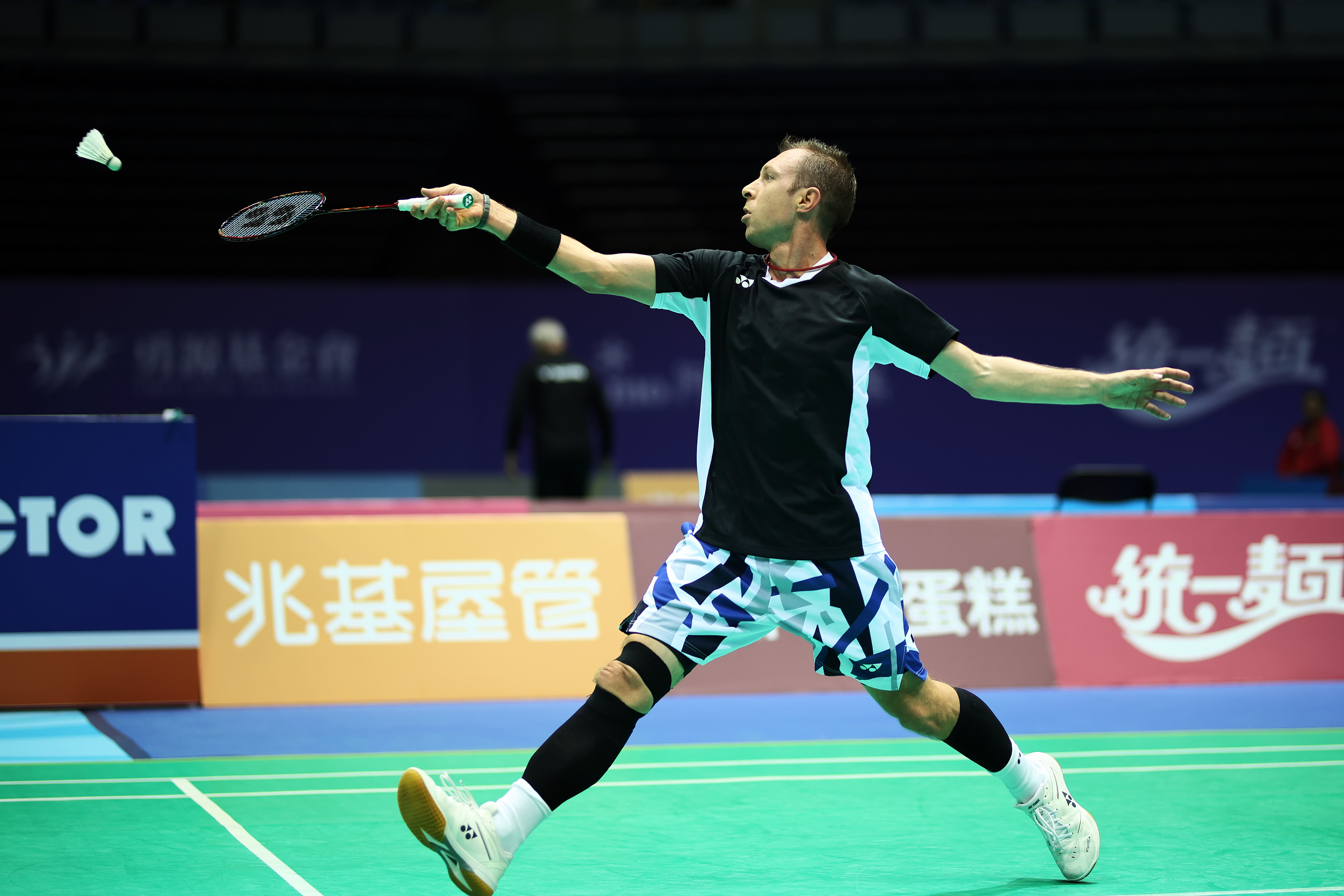
Zilberman at the 2025 Kaohsiung Masters

Zilberman represented Israel at the 2024 Summer Olympics in badminton in the Men's singles, at the Porte de la Chapelle Arena in Paris. It was his fourth consecutive Olympic Games; he was the sixth athlete in the history of the Israeli delegation to participate in four Olympics, joining the judoka Ariel Ze'evi, the sailor Yoel Sela, the artistic gymnast Alex Shatilov, the sport shooter Guy Starik, and the synchronized swimmer Anastasia Glushkov. The Badminton World Federation ranked him in 24th place among the 43 ranked players who competed in the Paris Olympics.

In his first of three first-round matches, in a see-saw battle that was the longest match of the day, Ireland's Nhat Nguyen defeated Zilberman in group play by two games to one. In his second match, he was beaten in straight sets by Denmark's reigning Olympic champion Viktor Axelsen, who went on to again win the Olympic gold medal. In his third match, Zilberman defeated Prince Dahal of Nepal in two straight sets, in a total of 36 minutes. Zilberman came in 27th in the competition. chievementsEuropean GamesMen's singles

Year	Venue	Opponent	Score	Result
2019	Falcon Club; Minsk, Belarus	(Denmark) Anders Antonsen	9–21, 11–21	Bronze
2023	Arena Jaskółka; Tarnów, Poland	(France) Christo Popov	10–21, 14–21	Bronze

=== European Championships ===
Men's singles
Year	Venue	Opponent	Score	Result
2022	Polideportivo Municipal Gallur; Madrid, Spain	(Denmark) Viktor Axelsen	10–21, 11–21	Bronze

=== BWF International Challenge/Series (16 titles, 11 runners-up) ===
Men's singles
Year	Tournament	Opponent	Score	Result
2011	Botswana International	(Uganda) Edwin Ekiring	21–10, 16–21, 20–22	(silver) Runner-up
2012	Tahiti International	(Malaysia) Tan Chun Seang	29–30, 8–21	(silver) Runner-up
2012	Suriname International	(Cuba) Osleni Guerrero	16–21, 21–18, 21–11	(gold) Winner
2013	Peru International	(Cuba) Osleni Guerrero	21–17, 13–21, 11–21	(silver) Runner-up
2013	Mercosul International	(Czech Republic) Jan Fröhlich	15–21, 16–21	(silver) Runner-up
2013	Hatzor International	(Russia) Vladimir Malkov	21–17, 22–24, 10–21	(silver) Runner-up
2014	Lagos International	(Austria) Luka Wraber	21–15, 21–12	(gold) Winner
2014	Ethiopia International	(Austria) Luka Wraber	11–7, 11–9, 11–6	(gold) Winner
2015	Turkey International	(Belgium) Yuhan Tan	21–12, 13–21, 18–21	(silver) Runner-up
2015	Ethiopia International	(Austria) Luka Wraber	21–13, 21–9	(gold) Winner
2016	Suriname International	(Belgium) Maxime Moreels	21–14, 12–21, 21–12	(gold) Winner
2017	Mauritius International	(Malaysia) Goh Giap Chin	19–21, 14–21	(silver) Runner-up
2017	Ethiopia International	(India) Aditya Joshi	21–7, 21–19	(gold) Winner
2017	Zambia International	(Germany) Jonathan Persson	21–15, 21–17	(gold) Winner
2018	Lagos International	(Malaysia) Misbun Ramdan Misbun	11–21, 21–19, 21–12	(gold) Winner
2019	Brazil International	(Canada) Brian Yang	21–17, 22–20	(gold) Winner
2019	Lagos International	(Vietnam) Nguyễn Tiến Minh	18–21, 23–25	(silver) Runner-up
2022	Santo Domingo Open	(Japan) Koo Takahashi	21–16, 21–15	(gold) Winner
2022	Maldives International	(Spain) Luis Enrique Peñalver	7–21, 21–11, 18–21	(silver) Runner-up
2024	Perú International Series	(Brazil) Jonathan Matias	21–19, 21–16	(gold) Winner
2024	Suriname International	(Peru) Adriano Viale	21–12, 23–21	(gold) Winner
2026	Uganda International	(Australia) Karono	14–21, 22–24	(silver) Runner-up

Men's doubles
Year	Tournament	Partner	Opponent	Score	Result
2025	Suriname International	(Peru) Adriano Viale	(Slovakia) Andrej Suchý (Slovakia) Simeon Suchý	22–20, 21–18	(gold) Winner

Mixed doubles
Year	Tournament	Partner	Opponent	Score	Result
2016	Suriname International	(Israel) Svetlana Zilberman	(Trinidad and Tobago) Alistair Espinoza (Trinidad and Tobago) Solangel Guzman	21–14, 21–15	(gold) Winner
2017	Lagos International	(Israel) Svetlana Zilberman	(Portugal) Duarte Nuno Anjo (Portugal) Sofia Setim	20–22, 21–16, 21–7	(gold) Winner
2017	Ethiopia International	(Israel) Svetlana Zilberman	(Algeria) Sifeddine Larbaoui (Algeria) Linda Mazri	Walkover	(gold) Winner
2017	Zambia International	(Israel) Svetlana Zilberman	(Germany) Jonathan Persson (Mauritius) Kate Foo Kune	Walkover	(silver) Runner-up

BWF International Challenge tournament
BWF International Series tournament
