= Ogar Siamupangila =

Zambian badminton player (born 1988)

Personal information
- Born: 1 September 1988 (age 38) Kitwe, Zambia
- Height: 1.60 m (5 ft 3 in)
- Weight: 56 kg (123 lb)

Sport
- Country: Zambia
- Sport: Badminton

Women's singles & doubles
- Highest ranking: 99 (WS 15 June 2017); 147 (WD 9 June 2016); 121 (XD 26 October 2017)
- BWF profile
Medal record
Women's badminton
Representing Zambia
All-Africa Games
Bronze medal – third place	2007 Algiers	Mixed doubles
African Championships
Bronze medal – third place	2007 Rose Hill	Mixed doubles
Bronze medal – third place	2017 Benoni	Mixed team

Ogar Siamupangila (born 1 September 1988) is a Zambian badminton player. She was the bronze medalist at the 2007 All-Africa Games in the mixed doubles event partnered with Eli Mambwe. Siamupangila represented her country at the 2006, 2010 and 2018 Commonwealth Games.

== Achievements ==
=== All-Africa Games ===
Mixed doubles
Year	Venue	Partner	Opponent	Score	Result
2007	Salle OMS El Biar; Algiers, Algeria	(Zambia) Eli Mambwe	(Nigeria) Greg Okuonghae (Nigeria) Grace Daniel	–, –	Bronze

=== African Championships ===
Mixed doubles
Year	Venue	Partner	Opponent	Score	Result
2007	Stadium Badminton Rose Hill; Rose Hill, Mauritius	(Zambia) Eli Mambwe	(South Africa) Chris Dednam (South Africa) Michelle Edwards	14–21, 12–21	Bronze

=== BWF International Challenge/Series (9 titles, 20 runners-up) ===
Women's singles
Year	Tournament	Opponent	Score	Result
2018	Zambia International	(Nigeria) Dorcas Ajoke Adesokan	18–21, 15–21	(silver) Runner-up
2018	Botswana International	(Jordan) Domou Amro	26–28, 19–21	(silver) Runner-up
2016	Zambia International	(Egypt) Menna Eltanany	13–21, 17–21	(silver) Runner-up
2016	Ethiopia International	(Egypt) Menna Eltanany	21–10, 18–21, 18–21	(silver) Runner-up
2016	Mauritius International	(India) Saili Rane	12–21, 20–22	(silver) Runner-up
2007	Kenya International	(United States) Shannon Pohl	19–21, 15–21	(silver) Runner-up
2006	Kenya International	(Kenya) Irene Kerimah		(gold) Winner

Women's doubles
Year	Tournament	Partner	Opponent	Score	Result
2018	Zambia International	(Zambia) Evelyn Siamupangila	(Uganda) Gladys Mbabazi (Uganda) Aisha Nakiyemba	21–12, 21–19	(gold) Winner
2018	Côte d'Ivoire International	(Zambia) Evelyn Siamupangila	(Ivory Coast) Nogona Celine Bakayoko (Ivory Coast) Aïcha Laurene N'Dia	21–7, 21–7	(gold) Winner
2018	Uganda International	(Zambia) Evelyn Siamupangila	(Egypt) Doha Hany (Egypt) Hadia Hosny	17–21, 18–21	(silver) Runner-up
2017	Uganda International	(Zambia) Evelyn Siamupangila	(Egypt) Doha Hany (Egypt) Hadia Hosny	10–21, 10–21	(silver) Runner-up
2016	Botswana International	(Zambia) Evelyn Siamupangila	(Egypt) Doha Hany (Egypt) Hadia Hosny	16–21, 17–21	(silver) Runner-up
2016	Zambia International	(Zambia) Evelyn Siamupangila	(Zambia) Elizaberth Chipeleme (Zambia) Ngandwe Miyambo	Walkover	(gold) Winner
2016	Ethiopia International	(Zambia) Evelyn Siamupangila	(Italy) Silvia Garino (Italy) Lisa Iversen	12–21, 21–9, 15–21	(silver) Runner-up
2016	Mauritius International	(Zambia) Evelyn Siamupangila	(Malaysia) Lee Zhi Qing (India) Prajakta Sawant	7–21, 6–21	(silver) Runner-up
2016	Uganda International	(Nigeria) Grace Gabriel	(Turkey) Cemre Fere (Turkey) Ebru Yazgan	16–21, 17–21	(silver) Runner-up
2016	Rose Hill International	(Zambia) Evelyn Siamupangila	(Uganda) Najjuka Gloria (Uganda) Daisy Nakalyango	18–21, 18–21	(silver) Runner-up
2015	Botswana International	(Nigeria) Grace Gabriel	(Zambia) Elizaberth Chipeleme (Zambia) Ngandwe Miyambo	21–11, 21–17	(gold) Winner
2015	Mauritius International	(Nigeria) Grace Gabriel	(Iran) Negin Amiripour (Iran) Aghaei Hajiagha Soraya	26–28, 14–21	(silver) Runner-up
2014	Botswana International	(Uganda) Shamim Bangi	(South Africa) Elme de Villiers (Nigeria) Grace Gabriel	18–21, 21–16, 17–21	(silver) Runner-up
2014	Ethiopia International	(Zambia) Evelyn Siamupangila	(Ethiopia) Yeruskaew Tura (Ethiopia) Firehiwot Getachew	11–3, 11–4, 11–5	(gold) Winner
2007	Kenya International	(Zambia) Delphine Nakanyika	(Kenya) Anna Maina (Kenya) Irene Kerimah	21–14, 21–14	(gold) Winner

Mixed doubles
Year	Tournament	Partner	Opponent	Score	Result
2018	Côte d'Ivoire International	(Zambia) Kalombo Mulenga	(Nigeria) Clement Krobakpo (Nigeria) Dorcas Ajoke Adesokan	9–21, 15–21	(silver) Runner-up
2016	Zambia International	(Zambia) Juma Muwowo	(Egypt) Ahmed Salah (Egypt) Menna Eltanany	7–21, 21–15, 18–21	(silver) Runner-up
2015	Botswana International	(Zambia) Juma Muwowo	(Egypt) Abdelrahman Kashkal (Egypt) Hadia Hosny	20–22, 14–21	(silver) Runner-up
2015	Zambia International	(Zambia) Juma Muwowo	(Egypt) Abdelrahman Kashkal (Egypt) Hadia Hosny	15–21, 8–21	(silver) Runner-up
2014	Kenya International	(Zambia) Donald Mabo	(Kenya) Patrick Kinyua Mbogo (Kenya) Mercy Joseph	4–21, 23–21, 21–16	(gold) Winner
2007	Kenya International	(Nigeria) Greg Okuonghae	(Uganda) Abraham Wogute (Uganda) Rita Namusisi	21–16, 21–16	(gold) Winner
2006	Kenya International	(Kenya) Naveed Kara	(Uganda) Abraham Wogute (Uganda) Rita Namusisi	18–21, 14–21	(silver) Runner-up

BWF International Challenge tournament
BWF International Series tournament
BWF Future Series tournament

== Personal life ==
Siamupangila's sister, Evelyn, is also a professional badminton player.
