= Bridget Shamim Bangi =

Ugandan badminton player (born 1993)

Personal information
- Born: 6 July 1993 (age 33) Luzira, Uganda
- Height: 1.62 m (5 ft 4 in)
- Weight: 55 kg (121 lb)

Sport
- Country: Uganda
- Sport: Badminton

Women's singles & doubles
- Highest ranking: 107 (WS 2 April 2015); 132 (WD 29 March 2015); 166 (XD 18 June 2015)
- Current ranking: 1279 (WS 23 November 2021)
- BWF profile
Medal record
Women's badminton
Representing Uganda
African Championshios
Bronze medal – third place	2012 Addis Ababa	Women's doubles
Africa Team Championships
Bronze medal – third place	2016 Rose Hill	Women's team

Bridget Shamim Bangi (born 6 July 1993) is a Ugandan badminton player. who started playing badminton at age 13 at Mariam High School. At the age of 21 she finished her degree in Insurance and Banking at Ndejje university She competed at the 2010 and 2018 Commonwealth Games.

== Achievements ==
=== African Championships ===
Women's doubles
Year	Venue	Partner	Opponent	Score	Result
2012	Arat Kilo Hall; Addis Ababa, Ethiopia	(Uganda) Margaret Nankabirwa	(South Africa) Annari Viljoen (South Africa) Michelle Edwards	10–21, 13–21	Bronze

=== BWF International Challenge/Series (5 titles, 5 runners-up) ===
Women's singles
Year	Tournament	Opponent	Score	Result
2017	Uganda International	(Jordan) Domou Amro	21–9, 21–16	(gold) Winner
2016	Rose Hill International	(South Africa) Johanita Scholtz	21–7, 20–22, 21–15	(gold) Winner
2012	Ethiopia International	(Mauritius) Shama Aboobakar	21–15, 19–21, 21–19	(gold) Winner

Women's doubles
Year	Tournament	Partner	Opponent	Score	Result
2017	Zambia International	(Uganda) Aisha Nakiyemba	(Italy) Silvia Garino (Italy) Lisa Iversen	17–21, 15–21	(silver) Runner Up
2014	Botswana International	(Zambia) Ogar Siamupangila	(South Africa) Elme De Villiers (Nigeria) Grace Gabriel	18–21, 21–16, 17–21	(silver) Runner Up
2014	Nigeria International	(Egypt) Hadia Hosny	(Nigeria) Tosin Damilola Atolagbe (Nigeria) Fatima Azeez	11–5, 11–10, 11–10	(gold) Winner
2013	Kenya International	(Uganda) Margaret Nankabirwa	(Nigeria) Dorcas Ajoke Adesokan (Nigeria) Grace Gabriel	18–21, 9–21	(silver) Runner-up
2013	Uganda International	(Uganda) Margaret Nankabirwa	(Mauritius) Shama Aboobakar (Nigeria) Grace Gabriel	13–21, 21–18, 12–21	(silver) Runner-up
2009	Uganda International	(Uganda) Margaret Nankabirwa	(Uganda) Rose Nakalya (Uganda) Norah Nassimbwa	21–16, 21–10	(gold) Winner

Mixed doubles
Year	Tournament	Partner	Opponent	Score	Result
2014	Botswana International	(Slovakia) Matej Hlinican	(South Africa) Willem Viljoen (South Africa) Annari Viljoen	17–21, 11–21	(silver) Runner Up

BWF International Challenge tournament
BWF International Series tournament
BWF Future Series tournament
