= Juma Muwowo =

Zambian badminton player (born 1980)

Personal information
- Born: 19 January 1980 (age 46) Kitwe, Zambia
- Height: 1.63 m (5 ft 4 in)
- Weight: 65 kg (143 lb)

Sport
- Country: Zambia
- Sport: Badminton

Men's
- Highest ranking: 241 (MS) 16 Dec 2010; 200 (MD) 31 May 2012; 163 (XD) 22 Sep 2016
- BWF profile
Medal record
Men's badminton
Representing Zambia
African Championships
Bronze medal – third place	2017 Benoni	Mixed team
Africa Team Championships
Bronze medal – third place	2006 Rose Hill	Men's team

Juma Muwowo (born 19 January 1980) is a Zambian male badminton player. Muwowo also play for the Central Sport Club in Zambia. In 2010, he competed at the Commonwealth Games in New Delhi, India. In 2015, he reach the final at the Zambia International tournament in the mixed doubles event with Ogar Siamupangila after beat their compatriot Chongo Mulenga and Mary Chilambe in the straight game, but they were defeated by A. Kashkal and Hadia Hosny of Egypt in the final. In 2016, the pair also reach the final in the same tournament and finished as runner-up.

== Achievements ==
=== BWF International Challenge/Series (3 runners-up) ===
Mixed doubles
Year	Tournament	Partner	Opponent	Score	Result
2016	Zambia International	(Zambia) Ogar Siamupangila	(Egypt) Ahmed Salah (Egypt) Menna Eltanany	7–21, 21–15, 18–21	(silver) Runner-up
2015	Botswana International	(Zambia) Ogar Siamupangila	(Egypt) Abdelrahman Kashkal (Egypt) Hadia Hosny	20–22, 14–21	(silver) Runner-up
2015	Zambia International	(Zambia) Ogar Siamupangila	(Egypt) Abdelrahman Kashkal (Egypt) Hadia Hosny	15–21, 8–21	(silver) Runner-up

BWF International Challenge tournament
BWF International Series tournament
BWF Future Series tournament
