= Sorayya Aghaei =

Iranian badminton player (born 1996)

Soraya Aghaei Hajiagha
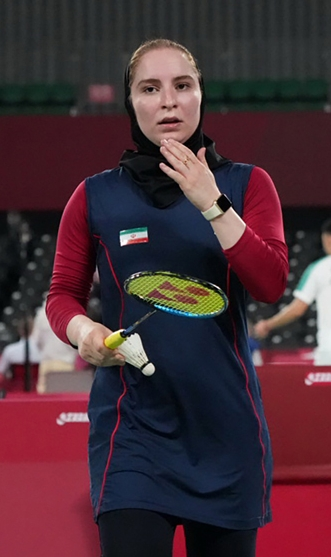
- Soraya Aghaei at Tokyo Olympics 2020

Personal information
- Full name: Soraya Aghaei Haji Agha
- Born: 28 January 1996 (age 30) Tehran, Iran
- Height: 1.68 m (5 ft 6 in)
- Weight: 60 kg (132 lb)

Sport
- Country: Iran
- Sport: Badminton
- Handedness: Right

Women's singles & doubles
- Highest ranking: 94 (WS 3 December 2015); 60 (WD 3 December 2015)
- BWF profile

Soraya Aghaei Hajiagha (Persian: ثریا آقایی حاجی‌آقا, born 28 January 1996) is an Iranian badminton player. She competed at the 2020 Tokyo Olympics, becoming the first woman badminton player to represent Iran at the Olympics.

== Achievements ==
=== BWF International Challenge/Series (4 titles, 7 runners-up) ===
Women's singles
Year	Tournament	Opponent	Score	Result
2015	Zambia International	(Mauritius) Kate Foo Kune	21–15, 0–1 retired	(silver) Runner-up
2017	Nepal International	(Hong Kong) Joy Xuan Deng	12–21, 5–21	(silver) Runner-up
2019	Pakistan International	(Pakistan) Mahoor Shahzad	15–21, 21–16, 16–21	(silver) Runner-up
2019	Cameroon International	(Nigeria) Dorcas Ajoke Adesokan	21–19, 21–12	(gold) Winner

Women's doubles
Year	Tournament	Partner	Opponent	Score	Result
2012	Iraq International	(Iran) Yosra Beigi	(Iran) Sahabeh Fard (Iran) Niki Torfinezhad	21–16, 21–11	(gold) Winner
2014	Kenya International	(Iran) Sara Delavari	(Iran) Negin Amiripour (Iran) Pegah Kamrani	22–24, 15–21	(silver) Runner-up
2015	Uganda International	(Iran) Negin Amiripour	(India) N. Sikki Reddy (India) Poorvisha S. Ram	7–11, 11–6, 11–8, 7–11, 3–11	(silver) Runner-up
2015	Mauritius International	(Iran) Negin Amiripour	(Nigeria) Grace Gabriel (Zambia) Ogar Siamupangila	28–26, 21–14	(gold) Winner
2015	Kazakhstan International	(Iran) Negin Amiripour	(Russia) Tatjana Bibik (Russia) Ksenia Polikarpova	14–21, 12–21	(silver) Runner-up
2015	Zambia International	(Iran) Negin Amiripour	(Egypt) Nadine Ashraf (Egypt) Menna El-Tanany	No match	(silver) Runner-up
2019	Côte d'Ivoire International	(Iran) Samin Abedkhojasteh	(Egypt) Doha Hany (Egypt) Hadia Hosny	22–20, 21–12	(gold) Winner

BWF International Challenge tournament
BWF International Series tournament
BWF Future Series tournament
