= Maxime Moreels =

Belgian badminton player (born 1991)

Personal information
- Born: 12 June 1991 (age 35) Nivelles, Belgium
- Years active: 2009-present
- Height: 1.82 m (6 ft 0 in)
- Weight: 74 kg (163 lb)

Sport
- Country: Belgium
- Sport: Badminton
- Handedness: Right

Men's singles & doubles
- Highest ranking: 83 (MS 13 July 2017); 172 (MD 6 October 2011); 216 (XD 16 September 2010)
- Current ranking: 242 (MS); 538 (MD with Milan Dratva) (22 November 2022)
- BWF profile

Maxime Moreels (born 12 June 1991) is a Belgian badminton player. He won the men's doubles title at the 2012 Belgian National Championships, and also the runner-up in the singles event from 2011-2017. In 2016, he won his first international title at the Zambia International tournament. He educated at the Haute Ecole Libre Mosane, and competed at the 2013 Summer Universiade in Kazan, Russia.

== Achievements ==
=== BWF International Challenge/Series (3 titles, 3 runners-up) ===
Men's singles
Year	Tournament	Opponent	Score	Result
2016	Suriname International	(Israel) Misha Zilberman	14–21, 21–12, 12–21	(silver) Runner-up
2016	Zambia International	(Mauritius) Julien Paul	21–12, 20–22, 21–16	(gold) Winner
2017	South Africa International	(Mauritius) Julien Paul	19–21, 21–15, 22–20	(gold) Winner
2018	Benin International	(Jordan) Bahaedeen Ahmad Alshannik	21–11, 21–13	(gold) Winner
2018	International Mexicano	(Guatemala) Kevin Cordón	19–21, 14–21	(silver) Runner-up
2020	Iran Fajr International	(Canada) Xiaodong Sheng	17–21, 12–21	(silver) Runner-up

BWF International Challenge tournament
BWF International Series tournament
BWF Future Series tournament
