= Road to Rio Program =

Program during the 2016 Summer Olympics

Road to Rio Program was a program that provided all the possible technical and some financial support to selected African badminton players who have the possibility to qualify for the 2016 Summer Olympics. The project was a collaboration between Badminton Confederation of Africa and Badminton World Federation. The program was exclusively for singles players as it would be difficult to qualify for the doubles events.

== Background ==
During a meeting which was held with the selected players and their coaches in Mauritius, Ian Wright the development director of the BWF explained that the BWF wants to help more African to qualify for the next Olympic Games and this is why the BWF/BCA are investing a lot of resources to achieve this objective. Mr. Wright also added that it is a must that all the National Federations commit to this program by respecting the different criteria that will be set by the BWF/BCA. For instance, National Federation should respect deadlines for entering their players in the selected tournaments and also provide necessary information for visa and other purposes in time. On the other hand, the players should also provide their training details and their availability until the Olympic Games in 2016.

== Training Camp ==
The selected players had their first training camp in Gaborone, Botswana. After the end of the 2013 Botswana International, the training camp was moved to Pretoria, South Africa.

== Selected Players ==
The following were the 14 players selected for the Road to Rio Program:

Male Players

Country	Player
Uganda	Edwin Ekiring
South Africa	Jacob Maliekal
South Africa	Prakash Vijayanath
Algeria	Adel Hamek
Algeria	Mohamed Abderrahime Belarbi
Ghana	Daniel Sam
Mauritius	Aatish Lubah
Botswana	Gaone Tawana

Female Players

Country	Player
Nigeria	Grace Gabriel
Mauritius	Kate Foo Kune
Egypt	Hadia Hosny
Kenya	Mercy Joseph
South Africa	Elme De Villiers
Mauritius	Nicki Chan-Lam

== Result ==
Jacob Maliekal and Kate Foo Kune represented their respective nations at the Rio 2016 Summer Olympics. Both players won one game during the group stage and ended up second in their groups, thus did not qualify for the knockout round.

- Jacob Maliekal

2016 Summer Olympics – Men's Singles
Round	Opponent	Score	Result
Group stage	(South Korea) Son Wan-ho	10–21, 10-21	Lost
Group stage	(Ukraine) Artem Pochtarev	21–18, 21-19	Win

- Kate Foo Kune

2016 Summer Olympics – Women's Singles
Round	Opponent	Score	Result
Group stage	(Australia) Wendy Chen Hsuan-yu	21–16, 21-19	Win
Group stage	(Thailand) Porntip Buranaprasertsuk	7-21, 18-21	Lost
