= Bahaedeen Ahmad Alshannik =

Jordanian badminton player (born 1997)

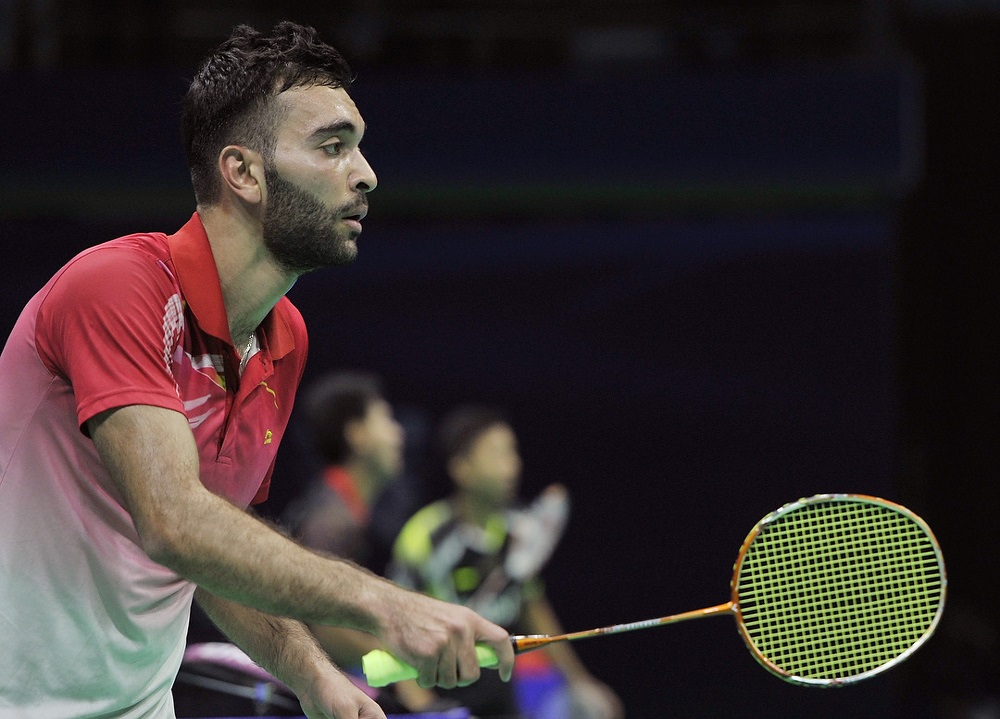
- Alshannik at the 2018 Badminton Asia Championships

Personal information
- Born: 18 July 1997 (age 29)

Sport
- Country: Jordan
- Sport: Badminton
- Handedness: Right

Men's singles & doubles
- Highest ranking: 88 (MS 2 May 2023); 62 (MD 22 March 2018); 98 (XD 26 February 2019)
- BWF profile
Medal record
Men's badminton
Representing Jordan
Arab Games
Bronze medal – third place	2023 Algeria	Men's singles
Bronze medal – third place	2023 Algeria	Men's doubles

Bahaedeen Ahmad Alshannik (born 18 July 1997) is a Jordanian badminton player. He was the mixed doubles runner-up at the Morocco International tournament in 2014 and 2015, and also men's doubles runner-up in 2015. At the Egypt International tournament he became the runner-up in the men's doubles event. He won his first international title at the 2017 Uganda International tournament in the mixed doubles event partnered with Domou Amro. At the Cameroon, he won double title when he captured the men's singles and doubles event.

== Achievements ==
=== BWF International Challenge/Series (8 titles, 16 runners-up) ===
Men's singles
Year	Tournament	Opponent	Score	Result
2017	Ivory Coast International	(Nigeria) Anuoluwapo Juwon Opeyori	18–21, 16–21	(silver) Runner-up
2017	Cameroon International	(India) Sahil Sipani	19–21, 21–17, 21–17	(gold) Winner
2018	Benin International	(Belgium) Maxime Moreels	11–21, 13–21	(silver) Runner-up
2022	Benin International	(Malaysia) Ong Zhen Yi	10–21, 21–19, 12–21	(silver) Runner-up
2022	Botswana International	(Kazakhstan) Dmitriy Panarin	13–21, 21–19, 21–10	(gold) Winner

Men's doubles
Year	Tournament	Partner	Opponent	Score	Result
2015	Egypt International	(Jordan) Mohd Naser Mansour Nayef	(Malaysia) Ridzwan Rahmat (Malaysia) Misbun Shawal Misbun	15–21, 21–15, 16–21	(silver) Runner-up
2015	Morocco International	(Jordan) Mohd Naser Mansour Nayef	(Malaysia) Ridzwan Rahmat (Malaysia) Misbun Shawal Misbun	18–21, 18–21	(silver) Runner-up
2017	Ivory Coast International	(Jordan) Mohd Naser Mansour Nayef	(Egypt) Adham Hatem Elgamal (Egypt) Mohamed Mostafa Kamel	21–10, 21–16	(gold) Winner
2017	Benin International	(Jordan) Mohd Naser Mansour Nayef	(Nigeria) Enejoh Abah (Nigeria) Ibrahim Adamu	21–15, 19–21, 18–21	(silver) Runner-up
2017	Cameroon International	(Jordan) Mohd Naser Mansour Nayef	(Egypt) Adham Hatem Elgamal (Egypt) Mohamed Mostafa Kamel	21–12, 21–15	(gold) Winner
2017	Ethiopia International	(Jordan) Mohd Naser Mansour Nayef	(India) Arjun M. R. (India) Ramchandran Shlok	7–21, 19–21	(silver) Runner-up
2017	Egypt International	(Jordan) Mohd Naser Mansour Nayef	(Malaysia) Yogendran Khrishnan (Germany) Jonathan Persson	15–21, 18–21	(silver) Runner-up
2018	Uganda International	(Jordan) Mohd Naser Mansour Nayef	(Kazakhstan) Artur Niyazov (Kazakhstan) Dmitriy Panarin	18–21, 10–21	(silver) Runner-up

Mixed doubles
Year	Tournament	Partner	Opponent	Score	Result
2014	Morocco International	(Jordan) Domou Amro	(Turkey) Melih Turgut (Turkey) Fatma Nur Yavuz	11–10, 8–11, 9–11, 2–11	(silver) Runner-up
2015	Morocco International	(Jordan) Domou Amro	(France) Vincent Espen (France) Manon Krieger	12–21, 21–18, 17–21	(silver) Runner-up
2017	Uganda International	(Jordan) Domou Amro	(Egypt) Ahmed Salah (Egypt) Menna Eltanany	16–21, 21–12, 21–19	(gold) Winner
2017	Morocco International	(Jordan) Domou Amro	(Slovakia) Milan Dratva (Slovakia) Martina Repiska	21–23, 5–21	(silver) Runner-up
2018	Egypt International	(Jordan) Domou Amro	(Switzerland) Oliver Schaller (Switzerland) Céline Burkart	4–23, 10–21	(silver) Runner-up
2018	Bahrain International	(Jordan) Domou Amro	(Bahrain) Adnan Ebrahim (Bahrain) Rachel Jacob Cherickal	21–16, 21–11	(gold) Winner
2018	Botswana International	(Jordan) Domou Amro	(South Africa) Andries Malan (South Africa) Jennifer Fry	18–21, 22–20, 19–21	(silver) Runner-up
2018	Zambia International	(Jordan) Domou Amro	(Nigeria) Anuoluwapo Juwon Opeyori (Nigeria) Dorcas Adesokan	19–21, 21–23	(silver) Runner-up
2018	South Africa International	(Jordan) Domou Amro	(South Africa) Andries Malan (South Africa) Jennifer Fry	14–21, 16–21	(silver) Runner-up
2019	Kenya International	(Jordan) Domou Amro	(Egypt) Ahmed Salah (Egypt) Hadia Hosny	11–21, 21–10, 21–15	(gold) Winner
2022	Zambia International	(Jordan) Domou Amro	(South Africa) Jarred Elliott (South Africa) Amy Ackerman	21–17, 11–21, 21–15	(gold) Winner

BWF International Challenge tournament
BWF International Series tournament
BWF Future Series tournament
