= Cameroon International =

Badminton tournament held in Cameroon

The Cameroon International is an international badminton tournament held in Yaoundé, Cameroon. This tournament established in 2017 and part of the Badminton Confederation of Africa Circuit.

== Past winners ==
Year	Men's singles	Women's singles	Men's doubles	Women's doubles	Mixed doubles
2017	(Jordan) Bahaedeen Ahmad Alshannik	(Egypt) Hana Hesham Mohamed	(Jordan) Bahaedeen Ahmad Alshannik (Jordan) Mohd Naser Mansour Nayef	(Cameroon) Laeticia Guefack Ghomsi (Cameroon) Louise Lisane Mbas	(Cameroon) Antoine Eddy Owona Ndimako (Cameroon) Louise Lisane Mbas
2018	(Mexico) Luis Ramón Garrido	(Egypt) Hadia Hosny	(Denmark) Mathias Pedersen (Germany) Jonathan Persson	(Egypt) Doha Hany (Egypt) Hadia Hosny	(Egypt) Adham Hatem Elgamal (Egypt) Doha Hany
2019	(Azerbaijan) Ade Resky Dwicahyo	(Iran) Sorayya Aghaei	(Nigeria) Godwin Olofua (Nigeria) Anuoluwapo Juwon Opeyori	(Egypt) Doha Hany (Egypt) Hadia Hosny	(Egypt) Adham Hatem Elgamal (Egypt) Doha Hany
2020	Cancelled (Note: This tournament, originally to be played from 8 to 11 October, was later postponed due to the COVID-19 pandemic in Cameroon.)				
2021	Cancelled (Note: This tournament, originally to be played from 11 to 14 November, was later postponed due to the COVID-19 pandemic in Cameroon.)				
2022	(India) Sathish Karunakaran	(Malaysia) Kasturi Radhakrishnan	(Philippines) Christian Bernardo (Philippines) Alvin Morada	(India) Srivedya Gurazada (India) Poorvisha S. Ram	(Philippines) Alvin Morada (Philippines) Alyssa Leonardo
2023	(Norway) Markus Barth	(Azerbaijan) Keisha Fatimah Azzahra	(India) P.S Ravikrishna (India) Sankar Prasad Udayakumar	(India) Rutaparna Panda (India) Swetaparna Panda	(Algeria) Koceila Mammeri (Algeria) Tanina Mammeri
2024	No competition				
2025	(Indonesia) Prahdiska Bagas Shujiwo	(Indonesia) Thalita Ramadhani Wiryawan	(India) Suraj Goala (India) Dhruv Rawat	(Indonesia) Isyana Syahira Meida (Indonesia) Rinjani Kwinnara Nastine	(Indonesia) M. Nawaf Khoiriyansyah (Indonesia) Nahya Muhyifa
2026	(India) Hmar Lalthazuala	(Azerbaijan) Keisha Fatimah Azzahra	(Thailand) Thanawin Madee (Thailand) Pongsakorn Thongkham	(India) Kavipriya Selvam (India) Simran Singhi	(India) Dhruv Rawat (India) K. Maneesha

== Performances by countries ==
As of the 2026 edition

Pos	Country	MS	WS	MD	WD	XD	Total
1	India	2	0	2	3	1	8
2	Egypt	0	2	0	2	2	6
3	Indonesia	1	1	0	1	1	4
4	Azerbaijan	1	2	0	0	0	3
5	Cameroon*	0	0	0	1	1	2
5	Jordan	1	0	1	0	0	2
5	Philippines	0	0	1	0	1	2
8	Algeria	0	0	0	0	1	1
8	Iran	0	1	0	0	0	1
8	Malaysia	0	1	0	0	0	1
8	Mexico	1	0	0	0	0	1
8	Nigeria	0	0	1	0	0	1
8	Norway	1	0	0	0	0	1
8	Thailand	0	0	1	0	0	1
15	Denmark	0	0	0.5	0	0	0.5
15	Germany	0	0	0.5	0	0	0.5
Total		7	7	7	7	7	35

* Host nation
