= Rajae Rochdy =

Moroccan badminton player (born 1983)

Personal information
- Born: Rajae Rochdy-Abbas; 8 August 1983 (age 43)

Sport
- Country: Morocco
- Sport: Badminton

Women's
- Highest ranking: 106 (WS) 15 Mar 2012; 129 (WD) 7 Jun 2012; 150 (XD) 8 Dec 2011
- BWF profile
Medal record
Women's badminton
Representing Morocco
African Championships
Bronze medal – third place	2006 Algiers	Mixed doubles

Rajae Rochdy-Abbas (Arabic: رجاء رشدي عباس; born 8 August 1983) is a Moroccan female badminton player. She trained at the Athlétic Club Boulogne Billancourt in France. In 2023, she was appointed as the Head of Operations for the Badminton Confederation of Africa.

== Career ==
Rajae represented Morocco at the 2006 African Badminton Championships and won a bronze medal in mixed doubles with Algerian singles player Nabil Lasmari.

In 2010, she won the women's doubles title at the Morocco International with Arba Nawar.

== Achievements ==
=== African Championships ===
Mixed doubles
Year	Venue	Partner	Opponent	Score	Result
2006	Salle OMS El Biar; Algiers, Algeria	(Algeria) Nabil Lasmari	(Seychelles) Georgie Cupidon (Seychelles) Juliette Ah-Wan		Bronze

=== BWF International Challenge/Series ===
Women's singles
Year	Tournament	Opponent	Score	Result
2010	Morocco International	(Egypt) Alaa Fatty	21-19, 11-21, 9-21	(silver) Runner-up

Women's doubles
Year	Tournament	Partner	Opponent	Score	Result
2013	Morocco International	(Morocco) Harag Nazik	(Egypt) Doha Hany (Egypt) Naja Mohamed	14-21, 21–13	(silver) Runner-up
2011	Ethiopia International	(Egypt) Hadia Hosny	(Ethiopia) Roza Dilla Mohammed (Ethiopia) Bezawit Tekle Asfaw	21-8, 21-10	(gold) Winner
2011	Namibia International	(Egypt) Hadia Hosny	(South Africa) Michelle Butler-Emmett (South Africa) Stacey Doubell	14-21, 9-21	(silver) Runner-up
2010	Morocco International	(Morocco) Arba Nawar	(Morocco) Dena Abudlfateh (Egypt) Alaa Fatty	21–10, 17–21, 21–19	(gold) Winner

Mixed doubles
Year	Tournament	Partner	Opponent	Score	Result
2011	Ethiopia International	(Croatia) Luka Zdenjak	(Ethiopia) Asnake Sahilu (Ethiopia) Yaekob Ayelech	21-16, 21-11	(gold) Winner
2010	Morocco International	(Croatia) Luka Zdenjak	(Egypt) Abdelrahman Kashkal (Egypt) Alaa Fatty	18-21, 21-19, 15-21	(silver) Runner-up

BWF International Challenge tournament
BWF International Series tournament
BWF Future Series tournament
