= Lisa Iversen =

Italian badminton player (born 1997)

Personal information
- Born: Lisa Schack Iversen; 21 June 1997 (age 29) Milan, Italy
- Years active: 2014
- Height: 1.70 m (5 ft 7 in)
- Weight: 63 kg (139 lb)

Sport
- Country: Italy
- Sport: Badminton
- Handedness: Right

Women's singles & doubles
- Highest ranking: 150 (WS 13 July 2017); 55 (WD 14 December 2017); 146 (XD 8 March 2018)
- BWF profile

Lisa Schack Iversen (born 21 June 1997) is an Italian badminton player. She won her first senior international title at the 2016 Ethiopia International tournament in the women's doubles event partnered with Silvia Garino. Played for the Italian Air Force team, she claimed the women's doubles National Championships title in 2017 with Garino.

== Achievements ==
=== BWF International Challenge/Series (2 titles, 3 runners-up) ===
Women's singles
Year	Tournament	Opponent	Score	Result
2016	Santo Domingo Open	(Dominican Republic) Nairoby Jiménez	21–18, 19–21, 18–21	(silver) Runner-up

Women's doubles
Year	Tournament	Partner	Opponent	Score	Result
2016	Ethiopia International	(Italy) Silvia Garino	(Zambia) Evelyn Siamupangila (Zambia) Ogar Siamupangila	21–12, 9–21, 21–15	(gold) Winner
2017	Giraldilla International	(Italy) Silvia Garino	(Hungary) Laura Sárosi (Mexico) Mariana Ugalde	15–21, 17–21	(silver) Runner-up
2017	Botswana International	(Italy) Silvia Garino	(South Africa) Michelle Butler-Emmett (South Africa) Jennifer Fry	24–26, 16–21	(silver) Runner-up
2017	Zambia International	(Italy) Silvia Garino	(Uganda) Bridget Shamim Bangi (Uganda) Aisha Nakiyemba	21–17, 21–15	(gold) Winner

BWF International Challenge tournament
BWF International Series tournament
BWF Future Series tournament
