= Jonathan Persson =

German badminton player

Personal information
- Born: 13 November 1994 (age 31)
- Height: 1.94 m (6 ft 4 in)

Sport
- Country: Germany
- Sport: Badminton

Men's singles & doubles
- Highest ranking: 132 (MS 21 June 2018); 126 (MD 12 Jan 2017); 112 (XD 1 March 2018)
- BWF profile

Jonathan Persson (born 13 November 1994) is a German badminton player. Persson has won some international tournament including at the 2014 Suriname, 2017 Zambia International in the mixed doubles event, and at the 2017 Egypt International in the men's doubles event.

== Achievements ==
=== BWF International Challenge/Series (5 titles, 6 runners-up) ===
Men's singles
Year	Tournament	Opponent	Score	Result
2017	Zambia International	(Israel) Misha Zilberman	15–21, 17–21	(silver) Runner-up
2018	Uganda International	(France) Pierrick Cajot	17–21, 11–21	(silver) Runner-up

Men's doubles
Year	Tournament	Partner	Opponent	Score	Result
2017	Brazil International	(Czech Republic) Adam Mendrek	(Russia) Evgenij Dremin (Russia) Denis Grachev	17–21, 16–21	(silver) Runner-up
2017	Egypt International	(Malaysia) Yogendran Khrishnan	(Jordan) Bahaedeen Ahmad Alshannik (Jordan) Mohd Naser Mansour Nayef	21–15, 21–18	(gold) Winner
2018	Cameroon International	(Denmark) Mathias Pedersen	(India) Shouvik Ghosh (India) Ratikanta Saha	21–15, 21–17	(gold) Winner
2018	Côte d'Ivoire International	(Denmark) Mathias Pedersen	(Nigeria) Godwin Olofua (Nigeria) Anuoluwapo Juwon Opeyori	14–21, 19–21	(silver) Runner-up

Mixed doubles
Year	Tournament	Partner	Opponent	Score	Result
2015	Suriname International	(Brazil) Ana Paula Campos	(Suriname) Dylan Darmohoetomo (Suriname) Jill Sjauw Mook	21–9, 21–15	(gold) Winner
2017	Brazil International	(Mauritius) Kate Foo Kune	(Brazil) Hugo Arthuso (Brazil) Fabiana Silva	11–21, 19–21	(silver) Runner-up
2017	Mauritius International	(Mauritius) Kate Foo Kune	(Malaysia) Yogendran Khrishnan (India) Prajakta Sawant	7–21, 17–21	(silver) Runner-up
2017	Zambia International	(Mauritius) Kate Foo Kune	(Israel) Misha Zilberman (Israel) Svetlana Zilberman	Walkover	(gold) Winner
2018	Uganda International	(Mauritius) Kate Foo Kune	(Mauritius) Julien Paul (Mauritius) Aurélie Allet	21–11, 21–18	(gold) Winner

BWF International Challenge tournament
BWF International Series tournament
BWF Future Series tournament
