= 2017 African Badminton Championships =

Tournament details
- Dates: 16–23 April 2017
- Venue: John Barrable Hall
- Location: Benoni, South Africa

The 2017 African Badminton Championships or All Africa Championships were held in Benoni, South Africa between 16–23 April, organised by the Badminton Confederation of Africa. At the team event, Egypt won the gold medal after beat South Africa with the score 3-1. Nigeria and Zambia settle for the bronze medal after reach the semi-final round.

== Medalists ==
Event	Gold	Silver	Bronze
Men's singles	(Algeria) Adel Hamek	(Egypt) Ahmed Salah	(Mauritius) Georges Julien Paul
Men's singles	(Algeria) Adel Hamek	(Egypt) Ahmed Salah	(Egypt) Ali Ahmed El Khateeb
Women's singles	(Mauritius) Kate Foo Kune	(Egypt) Hadia Hosny	(Nigeria) Dorcas Ajoke Adesokan
Women's singles	(Mauritius) Kate Foo Kune	(Egypt) Hadia Hosny	(Egypt) Menna Eltanany
Men's doubles	(Algeria) Koceila Mammeri and Youcef Sabri Medel	(South Africa) Andries Malan and James Hilton McManus	(Algeria) Mohamed Abderrahime Belarbi and Adel Hamek
Men's doubles	(Algeria) Koceila Mammeri and Youcef Sabri Medel	(South Africa) Andries Malan and James Hilton McManus	(Egypt) Ali Ahmed El Khateeb and Adham Hatem Elgamal
Women's doubles	(South Africa) Michelle Butler-Emmett and Jennifer Fry	(Egypt) Doha Hany and Hadia Hosny	(Nigeria) Dorcas Ajoke Adesokan and Zainab Momoh
Women's doubles	(South Africa) Michelle Butler-Emmett and Jennifer Fry	(Egypt) Doha Hany and Hadia Hosny	(South Africa) Sandra Le Grange and Johanita Scholtz
Mixed doubles	(South Africa) Andries Malan and Jennifer Fry	(Mauritius) Georges Julien Paul and Kate Foo Kune	(Egypt) Ahmed Salah and Menna Eltanany
Mixed doubles	(South Africa) Andries Malan and Jennifer Fry	(Mauritius) Georges Julien Paul and Kate Foo Kune	(Egypt) Adham Hatem Elgamal and Doha Hany
Teams	Egypt; Abdelrahman Abdelhakim, Ali Ahmed El Khateeb, Adham Hatem Elgamal, Ahmed Salah, Nadine Ashraf, Menna Eltanany, Doha Hany, Hadia Hosny	South Africa; Cameron Coetzer, Andries Malan, James Hilton McManus, Bongani von Bodenstein, Michelle Butler-Emmett, Jennifer Fry, Sandra Le Grange, Johanita Scholtz	Nigeria; Gideon Babalola, Habeeb Temitop Bello, Clement Krobakpo, Abdulfatai Salaudeen, Dorcas Ajoke Adesokan, Zainab Momoh
Teams	Egypt; Abdelrahman Abdelhakim, Ali Ahmed El Khateeb, Adham Hatem Elgamal, Ahmed Salah, Nadine Ashraf, Menna Eltanany, Doha Hany, Hadia Hosny	South Africa; Cameron Coetzer, Andries Malan, James Hilton McManus, Bongani von Bodenstein, Michelle Butler-Emmett, Jennifer Fry, Sandra Le Grange, Johanita Scholtz	Zambia; Chongo Ezra Mulenga, Kalombo Mulenga, Rodrick Mulenga Mwansa, Juma Muwowo, Elizaberth Chipeleme, Ngandwe Miyambo, Evelyn Siamupangila, Ogar Siamupangila

=== Medal table ===
* Host nation (South Africa)

Rank	Nation	Gold	Silver	Bronze	Total
1	South Africa*	2	2	1	5
2	Algeria	2	0	1	3
3	Egypt	1	3	5	9
4	Mauritius	1	1	1	3
5	Nigeria	0	0	3	3
6	Zambia	0	0	1	1
Totals (6 entries)		6	6	12	24

== Results ==
=== Men's singles ===
==== Finals ====
Semifinals
1	(Mauritius) Georges Julien Paul	21	15	20
(Algeria) Adel Hamek	15	21	22
(Egypt) Ali Ahmed El Khateeb	17	16
2	(Egypt) Ahmed Salah	21	21

Final
(Algeria) Adel Hamek	21	21
2	(Egypt) Ahmed Salah	19	13

=== Women's singles ===
==== Finals ====
Semifinals
1	(Mauritius) Kate Foo Kune	21	21
4	(Egypt) Menna Eltanany	14	16
(Nigeria) Dorcas Ajoke Adesokan	21	19	13
2	(Egypt) Hadia Hosny	13	21	21

Final
1	(Mauritius) Kate Foo Kune	16	21	21
2	(Egypt) Hadia Hosny	21	14	8

=== Men's doubles ===
==== Finals ====
Semifinals
(South Africa) Andries Malan (South Africa) James Hilton McManus	21	21
(Algeria) Mohamed Abderrahime Belarbi (Algeria) Adel Hamek	17	15
(Algeria) Koceila Mammeri (Algeria) Youcef Sabri Medel	18	21	21
(Egypt) Ali Ahmed El Khateeb (Egypt) Adham Hatem Elgamal	21	14	15

Final
(South Africa) Andries Malan (South Africa) James Hilton McManus	21	19	9
(Algeria) Koceila Mammeri (Algeria) Youcef Sabri Medel	13	21	21

=== Women's doubles ===
==== Finals ====
Semifinals
(South Africa) Michelle Butler-Emmett (South Africa) Jennifer Fry	21	22
(South Africa) Sandra Le Grange (South Africa) Johanita Scholtz	15	20
(Nigeria) Dorcas Ajoke Adesokan (Nigeria) Zainab Momoh	4	26	18
(Egypt) Doha Hany (Egypt) Hadia Hosny	21	24	21

Final
(South Africa) Michelle Butler-Emmett (South Africa) Jennifer Fry	21	15	21
(Egypt) Doha Hany (Egypt) Hadia Hosny	12	21	12

=== Mixed doubles ===
==== Finals ====
Semifinals
1	(Egypt) Ahmed Salah (Egypt) Menna Eltanany	19	15
(Mauritius) Georges Julien Paul (Mauritius) Kate Foo Kune	21	21
(South Africa) Andries Malan (South Africa) Jennifer Fry	21	21
(Egypt) Adham Hatem Elgamal (Egypt) Doha Hany	14	12

Final
(Mauritius) Georges Julien Paul (Mauritius) Kate Foo Kune	19	21	19
(South Africa) Andries Malan (South Africa) Jennifer Fry	21	19	21
