= Hadia Hosny =

Egyptian badminton player (born 1988)

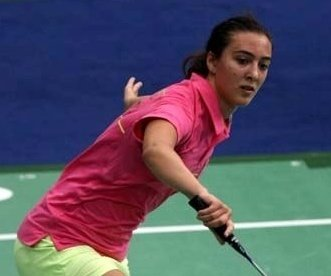
- Hadia Hosny 2012

Personal information
- Born: Hadia Hosny El Said; 30 July 1988 (age 38) Cairo, Egypt
- Years active: 2002–present
- Height: 1.77 m (5 ft 10 in)
- Weight: 67 kg (148 lb)

Sport
- Country: Egypt
- Sport: Badminton
- Handedness: Right

Women's singles & doubles
- Highest ranking: 79 (WS 29 November 2017); 35 (WD 17 March 2020); 50 (XD 17 November 2016)
- BWF profile
Medal record
Women's badminton
Representing Egypt
African Games
Gold medal – first place	2019 Rabat	Women's doubles
Bronze medal – third place	2015 Brazzaville	Women's singles
Bronze medal – third place	2015 Brazzaville	Mixed doubles
Bronze medal – third place	2007 Algiers	Women's doubles
Bronze medal – third place	2019 Rabat	Mixed team
African Championships
Gold medal – first place	2010 Kampala	Women's singles
Gold medal – first place	2017 Benoni	Mixed team
Silver medal – second place	2017 Benoni	Women's singles
Silver medal – second place	2017 Benoni	Women's doubles
Silver medal – second place	2018 Algiers	Women's doubles
Bronze medal – third place	2011 Marrakesh	Women's doubles
Bronze medal – third place	2011 Marrakesh	Mixed team
Bronze medal – third place	2013 Rose Hill	Women's singles
Bronze medal – third place	2018 Algiers	Women's singles
Bronze medal – third place	2018 Algiers	Mixed doubles
Bronze medal – third place	2019 Port Harcourt	Mixed doubles
Bronze medal – third place	2019 Port Harcourt	Mixed team
Africa Team Championships
Silver medal – second place	2010 Kampala	Women's team
Silver medal – second place	2016 Rose Hill	Women's team
Bronze medal – third place	2008 Rose Hill	Women's team
Bronze medal – third place	2012 Addis Ababa	Women's team
Bronze medal – third place	2018 Algiers	Women's team
Pan Arab Games
Silver medal – second place	2007 Cairo	Women's singles
Silver medal – second place	2007 Cairo	Women's team
Bronze medal – third place	2007 Cairo	Women's doubles

Hadia Mohamed Hosny Elsaid Mohamed Tawfik El Said (born 30 July 1988) is an Egyptian badminton player who represented her country at the 2008, 2012 and 2020 Summer Olympics. She won the women's singles title at the 2010 African Championships, and emerged as the women's doubles gold medalist at the 2019 African Games.

== Personal life ==
She currently works as a teaching assistant at the faculty of pharmacy of the British University in Egypt. She received a Bachelor's degree in Pharmacy from Ain Shams University in 2010 and an MSc degree in Medical biosciences from the University of Bath in 2012. Since 2015, she is attending as PhD student at the Pharmacology department of the Cairo University.

== Career ==
She started playing badminton in 2000. Her squash coach Tamer Raafet at school was in Egypt national badminton team, and she had just quit gymnastics for an injury the year before and it was hard to get back, then she decide to try badminton.

In September 2013, it was reported that she was one of the 14 players selected for the Road to Rio Program, a program that aimed to help African badminton players to compete at the 2016 Olympic Games.

Hadia Started her own Hadia Hosny Badminton Academy (HHBA) in Heliopolis Sporting club and Black ball to train the future generation of athletes in badminton and help the spreading of the sport more.

== Achievements ==
=== African Games ===
Women's singles
Year	Venue	Opponent	Score	Result
2015	Gymnase Étienne Mongha, Brazzaville, Republic of the Congo	(Mauritius) Kate Foo Kune	12–21, 10–21	Bronze

Women's doubles
Year	Venue	Partner	Opponent	Score	Result
2007	Salle OMS El Biar; Algiers, Algeria	(Egypt) Alaa Youssef			Bronze
2019	Ain Chock Indoor Sports Center; Casablanca, Morocco	(Egypt) Doha Hany	(Nigeria) Dorcas Ajoke Adesokan (Nigeria) Uchechukwu Deborah Ukeh	21–9, 21–16	Gold

Mixed doubles
Year	Venue	Partner	Opponent	Score	Result
2015	Gymnase Étienne Mongha; Brazzaville, Republic of the Congo	(Egypt) Abdelrahman Kashkal	(South Africa) Willem Viljoen (South Africa) Michelle Butler-Emmett	17–21, 19–21	Bronze

=== African Championships ===
Women's singles
Year	Venue	Opponent	Score	Result
2010	Sharing Youth Centre, Kampala, Uganda	(South Africa) Stacey Doubell	21–17, 21–12	Gold
2013	National Badminton Centre, Rose Hill, Mauritius	(Mauritius) Kate Foo Kune	18–21, 16–21	Bronze
2017	John Barrable Hall, Benoni, South Africa	(Mauritius) Kate Foo Kune	21–16, 14–21, 8–21	Silver
2018	Salle OMS Harcha Hacéne, Algiers, Algeria	(Mauritius) Kate Foo Kune	13–21, 21–18, 11–21	Bronze

Women's doubles
Year	Venue	Partner	Opponent	Score	Result
2011	Marrakesh, Morocco	(Egypt) Dina Nagy	(Nigeria) Maria Braimah (Nigeria) Susan Ideh	19–21, 18–21	Bronze
2017	John Barrable Hall; Benoni, South Africa	(Egypt) Doha Hany	(South Africa) Michelle Butler-Emmett (South Africa) Jennifer Fry	12–21, 21–15, 12–21	Silver
2018	Salle OMS Harcha Hacéne; Algiers, Algeria	(Egypt) Doha Hany	(Seychelles) Juliette Ah-Wan (Seychelles) Allisen Camille	18–21, 21–13, 18–21	Silver

Mixed doubles
Year	Venue	Partner	Opponent	Score	Result
2018	Salle OMS Harcha Hacéne; Algiers, Algeria	(Egypt) Ahmed Salah	(Algeria) Koceila Mammeri (Algeria) Linda Mazri	21–19, 17–21, 15–21	Bronze
2019	Alfred Diete-Spiff Centre; Port Harcourt, Nigeria	(Egypt) Ahmed Salah	(Algeria) Koceila Mammeri (Algeria) Linda Mazri	23–21, 17–21, 13–21	Bronze

=== Pan Arab Games ===
Women's singles
Year	Venue	Opponent	Score	Result
2007	Cairo, Egypt	(Syria) Karam Hadeel		Silver

=== BWF International Challenge/Series (20 titles, 22 runners-up) ===
Women's singles
Year	Tournament	Opponent	Score	Result
2010	Mauritius International	(France) Elisa Chanteur	13–21, 7–21	(silver) Runner-up
2013	Uganda International	(India) Saili Rane	12–21, 12–21	(silver) Runner-up
2013	South Africa International	(Portugal) Telma Santos	6–21, 10–21	(silver) Runner-up
2014	Ethiopia International	(Nigeria) Grace Gabriel	6–11, 7–11, 9–11	(silver) Runner-up
2014	Botswana International	(Nigeria) Grace Gabriel	15–21, 13–21	(silver) Runner-up
2015	Egypt International	(Egypt) Doha Hany	21–16, 24–26, 21–17	(gold) Winner
2016	South Africa International	(Russia) Evgeniya Kosetskaya	8–21, 10–21	(silver) Runner-up
2016	Botswana International	(Russia) Evgeniya Kosetskaya	8–21, 13–21	(silver) Runner-up
2018	Uganda International	(Mauritius) Kate Foo Kune	19–21, 10–21	(silver) Runner-up
2018	Cameroon International	(Egypt) Doha Hany	21–15, 15–21, 21–16	(gold) Winner

Women's doubles
Year	Tournament	Partner	Opponent	Score	Result
2008	Syria International	(Iran) Sabereh Kabiri	(Iran) Negin Amiripour (Iran) Sahar Zamanian	16–21, 15–21	(silver) Runner-up
2011	Namibia International	(Morocco) Rajae Rochdy	(South Africa) Michelle Butler-Emmett (South Africa) Stacey Doubell	14–21, 9–21	(silver) Runner-up
2011	Ethiopia International	(Morocco) Rajae Rochdy	(Ethiopia) Bezawit Tekle Asfaw (Ethiopia) Roza Dilla Mohammed	21–8, 21–10	(gold) Winner
2014	Nigeria International	(Uganda) Bridget Shamim Bangi	(Nigeria) Tosin Damilola Atolagbe (Nigeria) Fatima Azeez	11–5, 11–10, 11–10	(gold) Winner
2015	Egypt International	(Egypt) Doha Hany	(Egypt) Nadine Ashraf (Egypt) Menna Eltanany	28–26, 21–13	(gold) Winner
2016	Botswana International	(Egypt) Doha Hany	(Zambia) Evelyn Siamupangila (Zambia) Ogar Siamupangila	21–16, 21–17	(gold) Winner
2017	Uganda International	(Egypt) Doha Hany	(Zambia) Evelyn Siamupangila (Zambia) Ogar Siamupangila	21–10, 21–10	(gold) Winner
2018	Algeria International	(Egypt) Doha Hany	(Algeria) Halla Bouksani (Algeria) Linda Mazri	21–19, 21–11	(gold) Winner
2018	Uganda International	(Egypt) Doha Hany	(Zambia) Evelyn Siamupangila (Zambia) Ogar Siamupangila	21–17, 21–18	(gold) Winner
2018	Cameroon International	(Egypt) Doha Hany	(Cameroon) Louise Lisane Mbas (Cameroon) Stella Joel Ngadjui	21–7, 21–9	(gold) Winner
2019	Uganda International	(Egypt) Doha Hany	(Iran) Samin Abedkhojasteh (Jordan) Domou Amro	21–17, 12–21, 24–22	(gold) Winner
2019	Kenya International	(Egypt) Doha Hany	(Lithuania) Vytaute Fomkinaite (Lithuania) Gerda Voitechovskaja	15–21, 17–21	(silver) Runner-up
2019	Benin International	(Egypt) Doha Hany	(Peru) Daniela Macías (Peru) Dánica Nishimura	19–21, 21–18, 12–21	(silver) Runner-up
2019	Côte d'Ivoire International	(Egypt) Doha Hany	(Iran) Samin Abedkhojasteh (Iran) Sorayya Aghaei	20–22, 12–21	(silver) Runner-up
2019	Algeria International	(Egypt) Doha Hany	(Peru) Daniela Macías (Peru) Dánica Nishimura	13–21, 10–21	(silver) Runner-up
2019	Cameroon International	(Egypt) Doha Hany	(Cameroon) Madeleine Carene Leticia Akoumba Ze (Cameroon) Laeticia Guefack Ghomsi	21–6, 21–3	(gold) Winner
2019	Zambia International	(Egypt) Doha Hany	(Egypt) Nour Ahmed Youssri (Egypt) Jana Ashraf	21–9, 21–11	(gold) Winner
2020	Kenya International	(Egypt) Doha Hany	(Pakistan) Palwasha Bashir (Pakistan) Mahoor Shahzad	21–13, 21–17	(gold) Winner

Mixed doubles
Year	Tournament	Partner	Opponent	Score	Result
2011	Mauritius International	(Egypt) Abdelrahman Kashkal	(South Africa) Dorian James (South Africa) Michelle Claire Edwards	16–21, 11–21	(silver) Runner-up
2011	Namibia International	(Egypt) Abdelrahman Kashkal	(Australia) Luke Chong (Australia) Victoria Na	21–14, 16–21, 22–20	(gold) Winner
2013	Uganda International	(Egypt) Abdelrahman Kashkal	(Egypt) Mahmoud El Sayad (Egypt) Nadine Ashraf	21–14, 15–21, 19–21	(silver) Runner-up
2013	Botswana International	(Egypt) Abdelrahman Kashkal	(Mauritius) Sahir Edoo (Mauritius) Yeldie Louison	15–21, 21–14, 21–17	(gold) Winner
2013	South Africa International	(Egypt) Abdelrahman Kashkal	(Mauritius) Sahir Edoo (Mauritius) Yeldie Louison	21–12, 21–19	(gold) Winner
2015	Egypt International	(Egypt) Abdelrahman Kashkal	(Egypt) Ahmed Salah (Egypt) Menna Eltanany	18–21, 15–21	(silver) Runner-up
2015	Zambia International	(Egypt) Abdelrahman Kashkal	(Zambia) Juma Muwowo (Zambia) Ogar Siamupangila	21–15, 21–8	(gold) Winner
2015	Botswana International	(Egypt) Abdelrahman Kashkal	(Zambia) Juma Muwowo (Zambia) Ogar Siamupangila	22–20, 21–14	(gold) Winner
2015	South Africa International	(Egypt) Abdelrahman Kashkal	(South Africa) Andries Malan (South Africa) Jennifer Fry	21–12, 19–21, 18–21	(silver) Runner-up
2016	Uganda International	(Egypt) Abdelrahman Kashkal	(Jordan) Mohd Naser Mansour Nayef (Jordan) Mazahreh Leina Fehmi	21–16, 16–21, 21–11	(gold) Winner
2016	Botswana International	(Mauritius) Julien Paul	(Russia) Anatoliy Yartsev (Russia) Evgeniya Kosetskaya	12–21, 10–21	(silver) Runner-up
2018	Cameroon International	(Egypt) Ahmed Salah	(Egypt) Adham Hatem Elgamal (Egypt) Doha Hany	21–13, 15–21, 15–21	(silver) Runner-up
2019	Kenya International	(Egypt) Ahmed Salah	(Jordan) Bahaedeen Ahmad Alshannik (Jordan) Domou Amro	21–11, 10–21, 15–21	(silver) Runner-up
2019	Côte d'Ivoire International	(Egypt) Ahmed Salah	(United States) Howard Shu (United States) Paula Lynn Obañana	16–21, 14–21	(silver) Runner-up

BWF International Challenge tournament
BWF International Series tournament
BWF Future Series tournament
