= Evelyn Siamupangila =

Zambian badminton player (born 1997)

Personal information
- Nickname: Eva
- Born: 26 February 1997 (age 29) Kabwe, Zambia
- Height: 1.72 m (5 ft 8 in)
- Weight: 65 kg (143 lb)

Sport
- Country: Zambia
- Sport: Badminton
- Handedness: Right

Women's singles & doubles
- Highest ranking: 180 (WS 27 April 2017); 147 (WD 15 June 2017); 170 (XD 12 July 2018)
- BWF profile
Medal record
Women's badminton
Representing Zambia
African Championships
Bronze medal – third place	2017 Benoni	Mixed team

Evelyn Siamupangila (born 26 February 1997) is a Zambian badminton player. She competed at the 2018 Commonwealth Games in Gold Coast.

== Personal life ==
Her sister Ogar also a professional badminton player.

== Achievements ==
=== BWF International Challenge/Series (4 titles, 6 runners-up) ===
Women's doubles
Year	Tournament	Partner	Opponent	Score	Result
2018	Zambia International	(Zambia) Ogar Siamupangila	(Uganda) Gladys Mbabazi (Uganda) Aisha Nakiyemba	21–12, 21–19	(gold) Winner
2018	Côte d'Ivoire International	(Zambia) Ogar Siamupangila	(Ivory Coast) Nogona Celine Bakayoko (Ivory Coast) Aïcha Laurene N'Dia	21–7, 21–7	(gold) Winner
2018	Uganda International	(Zambia) Ogar Siamupangila	(Egypt) Doha Hany (Egypt) Hadia Hosny	17–21, 18–21	(silver) Runner-up
2017	Uganda International	(Zambia) Ogar Siamupangila	(Egypt) Doha Hany (Egypt) Hadia Hosny	10–21, 10–21	(silver) Runner-up
2016	Botswana International	(Zambia) Ogar Siamupangila	(Egypt) Doha Hany (Egypt) Hadia Hosny	16–21, 17–21	(silver) Runner-up
2016	Zambia International	(Zambia) Ogar Siamupangila	(Zambia) Elizaberth Chipeleme (Zambia) Ngandwe Miyambo	Walkover	(gold) Winner
2016	Ethiopia International	(Zambia) Ogar Siamupangila	(Italy) Silvia Garino (Italy) Lisa Iversen	12–21, 21–9, 15–21	(silver) Runner-up
2016	Mauritius International	(Zambia) Ogar Siamupangila	(Malaysia) Lee Zhi Qing (India) Prajakta Sawant	7–21, 6–21	(silver) Runner-up
2016	Rose Hill International	(Zambia) Ogar Siamupangila	(Uganda) Najjuka Gloria (Uganda) Daisy Nakalyango	18–21, 18–21	(silver) Runner-up
2014	Ethiopia International	(Zambia) Ogar Siamupangila	(Ethiopia) Yeruskaew Tura (Ethiopia) Firehiwot Getachew	11–3, 11–4, 11–5	(gold) Winner

BWF International Challenge tournament
BWF International Series tournament
BWF Future Series tournament
