= Silvia Garino =

Italian badminton player (born 1998)

Personal information
- Born: 24 June 1998 (age 28) Acqui Terme, Italy
- Height: 1.70 m (5 ft 7 in)
- Weight: 60 kg (132 lb)

Sport
- Country: Italy
- Sport: Badminton
- Handedness: Right

Women's singles & doubles
- Highest ranking: 218 (WS 20 April 2017); 55 (WD 14 December 2017); 136 (XD 21 December 2017)
- BWF profile

Silvia Garino (born 24 June 1998) is an Italian badminton player. She won her first senior international title at the 2016 Ethiopia International tournament in the women's doubles event partnered with Lisa Iversen. She and Iversen claimed the women's doubles National Championships title in 2017 and 2018. In 2019, together with Kevin Strobl, Garino won the title in mixed double at the National Championships.

== Achievements ==
=== BWF International Challenge/Series (2 titles, 2 runners-up) ===
Women's doubles
Year	Tournament	Partner	Opponent	Score	Result
2017	Zambia International	(Italy) Lisa Iversen	(Uganda) Bridget Shamim Bangi (Uganda) Aisha Nakiyemba	21–17, 21–15	(gold) Winner
2017	Botswana International	(Italy) Lisa Iversen	(South Africa) Michelle Butler-Emmett (South Africa) Jennifer Fry	24–26, 16–21	(silver) Runner Up
2017	Giraldilla International	(Italy) Lisa Iversen	(Hungary) Laura Sárosi (Mexico) Mariana Ugalde	15–21, 17–21	(silver) Runner Up
2016	Ethiopia International	(Italy) Lisa Iversen	(Zambia) Evelyn Siamupangila (Zambia) Ogar Siamupangila	21–12, 9–21, 21–15	(gold) Winner

BWF International Challenge tournament
BWF International Series tournament
BWF Future Series tournament
