= 2006 Thomas & Uber Cups Preliminaries for Africa =

Tournament details
- Dates: 19–23 February 2006
- Edition: 2
- Venue: National Badminton Centre
- Location: Rose Hill, Mauritius

The 2006 Thomas & Uber Cups Preliminaries for Africa were held in Rose Hill, Mauritius, between 19 and 23 February 2006, and were organised by Mauritius Badminton Association. South Africa was the defending champion in both the men's and women's team events.

This tournament served as the qualification stage for African countries vying for a spot in the 2006 Thomas & Uber Cup. South Africa men's and women's teams successfully qualified to compete in the 2006 Thomas & Uber Cup held in Japan.

== Medalists ==
- Men's Team

Medal	Team	Players
Gold	South Africa	Chris Dednam, Johan Kleingeld, Dorian James, Wiaan Viljoen
Silver	Mauritius	Stephan Beeharry, Vishal Sawaram, Eddy Clarisse, Kiran Baboolall
Bronze	Zambia	Eli Mambwe, Juma Muwowo, Lucio Mambwe, Kaite Mubanga

- Women's Team

Medal	Team	Players
Gold	South Africa	Michelle Edwards, Chantal Botts, Kerry-Lee Harrington, Annari Viljoen
Silver	Mauritius	Amrita Sawaram, Shama Aboobakar, Marlyse Marquer, Karen Foo Kune
Bronze	Seychelles	Juliette Ah-Wan, Cynthia Course, Shirley Etienne, Danielle Jupiter

== Men's team ==
=== Round-robin ===
Pos	Team	Pld	W	L	MF	MA	MD	Pts	Qualification	South Africa	Mauritius	Zambia	Seychelles	Kenya	Morocco
1	South Africa	5	5	0	21	4	+17	5	2006 Thomas Cup	—	3–2	4–1	4–1	5–0	5–0
2	Mauritius	5	4	1	21	4	+17	4			—	4–1	5–0	5–0	5–0
3	Zambia	5	3	2	15	10	+5	3				—	4–1	4–1	5–0
4	Seychelles	5	2	3	8	17	−9	2					—	3–2	3–2
5	Kenya	5	1	4	8	17	−9	1						—	5–0
6	Morocco	5	0	5	2	23	−21	0							—

Source: africa-badminton.com

== Women's team ==
=== Round-robin ===
Pos	Team	Pld	W	L	MF	MA	MD	Pts	Qualification	South Africa	Mauritius	Seychelles	Zambia
1	South Africa	3	3	0	12	3	+9	3	2006 Uber Cup	—	3–2	5–0	4–1
2	Mauritius	3	2	1	9	6	+3	2			—	4–1	5–0
3	Seychelles	3	1	2	4	11	−7	1				—	3–2
4	Zambia	3	0	3	3	12	−9	0					—

Source: africa-badminton.com
