= Eli Mambwe =

Zambian badminton player (born 1982)

Personal information
- Born: 18 July 1982 (age 43) Kalulushi, Zambia
- Height: 1.75 m (5 ft 9 in)
- Weight: 65 kg (143 lb)

Sport
- Country: Zambia
- Sport: Badminton
Medal record
Men's badminton
Representing Zambia
All-Africa Games
Silver medal – second place	2007 Algiers	Men's singles
Bronze medal – third place	2007 Algiers	Mixed doubles
Africa Team Championships
Bronze medal – third place	2006 Rose Hill	Men's team

Eli Mambwe (born July 18, 1982, in Kalulushi) is a Zambian badminton player. He won a silver medal for the men's singles at the 2007 All-Africa Games in Algiers, Algeria, losing out to the host nation's Nabil Lasmari.

At the 2006 Commonwealth Games in Melbourne, Mambwe competed in the men's singles, as well as the mixed doubles event. In the singles, he was defeated in the first round by New Zealand's John Moody, with a score of 10–21 and 14–21. Playing with Olga Siamupangila, he lost in the first round of the mixed doubles, against New Zealand pair, Craig Cooper and Lianne Shirley, with a score of 11–21 and 18–21.

Mambwe competed at the 2008 Summer Olympics in Beijing, China, after accepting a tripartite commission invitation into the men's singles by the International Badminton Federation. He was also the first badminton player to represent Zambia at the Olympics. He received a bye into the second round of the competition, before losing out to France's Erwin Kehlhoffner, with a score of 15–21, 17–21.

At the 2010 Commonwealth Games in Delhi, Mambwe competed in three different badminton events. In the men's singles, he was not able to redeem himself and improve his performance from the previous games, as he lost once again in the first round to Martyn Lewis of Wales, with a two-set score of 19–21 and 16–21. By the following day, Mambwe paired up with Juma Muwowo in the men's doubles, where his pair was strongly defeated by the English pair, Anthony Clark and Nathan Robertson, with a unanimous score of 8–21 and 12–21. Few hours later, he played again with Olga Siamupangila in the mixed doubles, where they beat the Jamaican pair, Garron Palmer and Alya Lewis, with a three-set score of 14–21, 21–17, and 21–17. He and his partner fought against the Singaporean pair Chayut Triyachart and Yao Lei in the second round, with a score of 21–11, but they eventually retired before the second set, when Mambwe had a pulled hamstring muscle during the game.
