= Doha Hany =

Egyptian badminton player (born 1997)

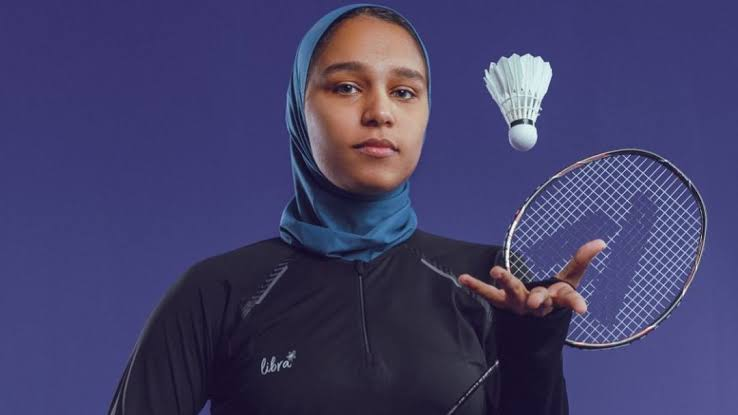

Personal information
- Born: Doha Hany Mostafa; 10 September 1997 (age 29) Cairo, Egypt
- Years active: 2013–present
- Height: 1.64 m (5 ft 5 in)

Sport
- Country: Egypt
- Sport: Badminton
- Handedness: Right
- Coached by: Abdelrahman Kashkal

Women's singles & doubles
- Highest ranking: 73 (WS 27 September 2022); 35 (WD with Hadia Hosny, 17 March 2020); 43 (XD with Adham Hatem Elgamal, 27 September 2022)
- BWF profile
Medal record
Women's badminton
Representing Egypt
African Games
| Gold medal – first place | 2019 Rabat | Women's doubles |
| Silver medal – second place | 2019 Rabat | Mixed doubles |
| Silver medal – second place | 2023 Accra | Mixed doubles |
| Bronze medal – third place | 2019 Rabat | Women's singles |
| Bronze medal – third place | 2019 Rabat | Mixed team |
| Bronze medal – third place | 2023 Accra | Women's doubles |
African Championships
| Gold medal – first place | 2020 Cairo | Women's doubles |
| Gold medal – first place | 2020 Cairo | Mixed doubles |
| Silver medal – second place | 2017 Benoni | Women's doubles |
| Silver medal – second place | 2018 Algiers | Women's doubles |
| Silver medal – second place | 2021 Kampala | Women's singles |
| Silver medal – second place | 2021 Kampala | Mixed doubles |
| Silver medal – second place | 2022 Kampala | Women's singles |
| Silver medal – second place | 2023 Benoni | Mixed doubles |
| Silver medal – second place | 2024 Cairo | Mixed doubles |
| Silver medal – second place | 2025 Douala | Women's singles |
| Silver medal – second place | 2025 Douala | Mixed doubles |
| Silver medal – second place | 2026 Gaborone | Women's doubles |
| Bronze medal – third place | 2017 Benoni | Mixed doubles |
| Bronze medal – third place | 2018 Algiers | Women's singles |
| Bronze medal – third place | 2018 Algiers | Mixed doubles |
| Bronze medal – third place | 2019 Port Harcourt | Women's singles |
| Bronze medal – third place | 2019 Port Harcourt | Mixed doubles |
| Bronze medal – third place | 2020 Cairo | Women's singles |
| Bronze medal – third place | 2022 Kampala | Women's doubles |
| Bronze medal – third place | 2026 Gaborone | Mixed doubles |
Africa Mixed Team Championships
| Gold medal – first place | 2017 Benoni | Mixed team |
| Gold medal – first place | 2021 Kampala | Mixed team |
| Gold medal – first place | 2023 Benoni | Mixed team |
| Bronze medal – third place | 2019 Port Harcourt | Mixed team |
| Bronze medal – third place | 2025 Douala | Mixed team |
Africa Women's Team Championships
| Gold medal – first place | 2020 Cairo | Women's team |
| Gold medal – first place | 2022 Kampala | Women's team |
| Silver medal – second place | 2016 Rose Hill | Women's team |
| Silver medal – second place | 2026 Gaborone | Women's team |
| Bronze medal – third place | 2018 Algiers | Women's team |
Mediterranean Games
| Bronze medal – third place | 2022 Oran | Women's singles |
Arab Championships
| Gold medal – first place | 2021 Hamad Town | Mixed doubles |
African Youth Games
| Bronze medal – third place | 2014 Gaborone | Girls' singles |
| Bronze medal – third place | 2014 Gaborone | Girls' doubles |
| Bronze medal – third place | 2014 Gaborone | Mixed team |
African Junior Championships
| Bronze medal – third place | 2013 Algiers | Girls' doubles |

Doha Hany Mostafa (born 10 September 1997) is an Egyptian badminton player. She started playing badminton aged five, and joined the national team in 2013. She won the bronze medal at the 2014 African Youth Games, and represented her country at the Summer Youth Olympics in Nanjing, China. She was the women's doubles gold medalist at the 2019 African Games. Hany featured in Egypt team that for the first time won the All Africa Women's Team Championships in 2020, also claimed two titles in the individual competition by winning the women's and mixed doubles event. She competed at the 2020 Summer Olympics in three different events; women's singles, doubles and mixed doubles. Hany is a member of the BWF Athletes' Commission serving from 2025 to 2029.

== Achievements ==
=== African Games ===
Women's singles
| Year | Venue | Opponent | Score | Result |
|---|---|---|---|---|
| 2019 | Ain Chock Indoor Sports Center, Casablanca, Morocco | (Nigeria) Dorcas Adesokan | 14–21, 11–21 | Bronze |

Women's doubles
| Year | Venue | Partner | Opponent | Score | Result |
|---|---|---|---|---|---|
| 2019 | Ain Chock Indoor Sports Center; Casablanca, Morocco | (Egypt) Hadia Hosny | (Nigeria) Dorcas Adesokan (Nigeria) Uchechukwu Deborah Ukeh | 21–9, 21–16 | Gold |
| 2023 | Borteyman Sports Complex; Accra, Ghana | (Egypt) Nour Ahmed Youssri | (Uganda) Husina Kobugabe (Uganda) Gladys Mbabazi | 14–21, 14–21 | Bronze |

Mixed doubles
| Year | Venue | Partner | Opponent | Score | Result |
|---|---|---|---|---|---|
| 2019 | Ain Chock Indoor Sports Center; Casablanca, Morocco | (Egypt) Adham Hatem Elgamal | (Algeria) Koceila Mammeri (Algeria) Linda Mazri | 19–21, 16–21 | Silver |
| 2023 | Borteyman Sports Complex; Accra, Ghana | (Egypt) Adham Hatem Elgamal | (Algeria) Koceila Mammeri (Algeria) Tanina Mammeri | 11–21, 15–21 | Silver |

=== African Championships ===
Women's singles
| Year | Venue | Opponent | Score | Result |
|---|---|---|---|---|
| 2018 | Salle OMS Harcha Hacéne, Algiers, Algeria | (Nigeria) Dorcas Adesokan | 14–21, 15–21 | Bronze |
| 2019 | Alfred Diete-Spiff Centre, Port Harcourt, Nigeria | (Mauritius) Kate Foo Kune | 16–21, 13–21 | Bronze |
| 2020 | Cairo Stadium Hall 2, Cairo, Egypt | (Mauritius) Kate Foo Kune | 19–21, 12–21 | Bronze |
| 2021 | MTN Arena, Kampala, Uganda | (South Africa) Johanita Scholtz | 15–21, 11–21 | Silver |
| 2022 | Lugogo Arena, Kampala, Uganda | (Egypt) Nour Ahmed Youssri | 16–21, 16–21 | Silver |
| 2025 | Gymnase de Japoma, Douala, Cameroon | (Egypt) Nour Ahmed Youssri | 7–21, 14–21 | Silver |

Women's doubles
| Year | Venue | Partner | Opponent | Score | Result |
|---|---|---|---|---|---|
| 2017 | John Barrable Hall, Benoni, South Africa | (Egypt) Hadia Hosny | (South Africa) Michelle Butler-Emmett (South Africa) Jennifer Fry | 12–21, 21–15, 12–21 | Silver |
| 2018 | Salle OMS Harcha Hacéne, Algiers, Algeria | (Egypt) Hadia Hosny | (Seychelles) Juliette Ah-Wan (Seychelles) Allisen Camille | 18–21, 21–13, 18–21 | Silver |
| 2020 | Cairo Stadium Hall 2, Cairo, Egypt | (Egypt) Hadia Hosny | (Nigeria) Dorcas Adesokan (Nigeria) Uchechukwu Deborah Ukeh | 21–14, 21–17 | Gold |
| 2022 | Lugogo Arena, Kampala, Uganda | (Egypt) Nour Ahmed Youssri | (South Africa) Amy Ackerman (South Africa) Deidre Laurens Jordaan | 10–21, 19–21 | Bronze |
| 2026 | Royal Aria, Gaborone, Botswana | (Egypt) Nour Ahmed Youssri | (South Africa) Amy Ackerman (South Africa) Johanita Scholtz | 18–21, 17–21 | Silver |

Mixed doubles
| Year | Venue | Partner | Opponent | Score | Result |
|---|---|---|---|---|---|
| 2017 | John Barrable Hall, Benoni, South Africa | (Egypt) Adham Hatem Elgamal | (South Africa) Andries Malan (South Africa) Jennifer Fry | 14–21, 12–21 | Bronze |
| 2018 | Salle OMS Harcha Hacéne, Algiers, Algeria | (Egypt) Adham Hatem Elgamal | (Nigeria) Enejoh Abah (Nigeria) Peace Orji | 19–21, 21–23 | Bronze |
| 2019 | Alfred Diete-Spiff Centre, Port Harcourt, Nigeria | (Egypt) Adham Hatem Elgamal | (Nigeria) Enejoh Abah (Nigeria) Peace Orji | 15–21, 12–21 | Bronze |
| 2020 | Cairo Stadium Hall 2, Cairo, Egypt | (Egypt) Adham Hatem Elgamal | (Algeria) Koceila Mammeri (Algeria) Linda Mazri | 21–13, 18–21, 21–19 | Gold |
| 2021 | MTN Arena, Kampala, Uganda | (Egypt) Adham Hatem Elgamal | (Algeria) Koceila Mammeri (Algeria) Tanina Mammeri | 10–21, 7–21 | Silver |
| 2023 | John Barrable Hall, Benoni, South Africa | (Egypt) Adham Hatem Elgamal | (Algeria) Koceila Mammeri (Algeria) Tanina Mammeri | 15–21, 13–21 | Silver |
| 2024 | Cairo Stadium Indoor Halls Complex, Cairo, Egypt | (Egypt) Adham Hatem Elgamal | (Algeria) Koceila Mammeri (Algeria) Tanina Mammeri | 23–21, 16–21, 11–21 | Silver |
| 2025 | Gymnase de Japoma, Douala, Cameroon | (Egypt) Adham Hatem Elgamal | (Algeria) Koceila Mammeri (Algeria) Tanina Mammeri | Walkover | Silver |
| 2026 | Royal Aria, Gaborone, Botswana | (Egypt) Adham Hatem Elgamal | (South Africa) Caden Kakora (South Africa) Amy Ackerman | 21–19, 18–21, 16–21 | Bronze |

=== Mediterranean Games ===
Women's singles
| Year | Venue | Opponent | Score | Result |
|---|---|---|---|---|
| 2022 | Multipurpose Omnisports Hall, Oued Tlélat, Algeria | (Turkey) Neslihan Yiğit | 13–21, 6–21 | Bronze |

=== Arab Championships ===
Mixed doubles
| Year | Venue | Partner | Opponent | Score | Result | Ref. |
|---|---|---|---|---|---|---|
| 2021 | Hamad Town Youth Model Centre; Hamad Town, Bahrain | (Egypt) Adham Hatem Elgamal | (Jordan) Bahaedeen Alshannik (Jordan) Domou Amro | 21–16, 21–13 | Gold | |

=== African Youth Games ===
Girls' singles
| Year | Venue | Opponent | Score | Result |
|---|---|---|---|---|
| 2014 | Otse Police College, Gaborone, Botswana | (Nigeria) Dorcas Adesokan | 13–21, 15–21 | Bronze |

Girls' doubles
| Year | Venue | Partner | Opponent | Score | Result |
|---|---|---|---|---|---|
| 2014 | Otse Police College; Gaborone, Botswana | (Egypt) Nourhan Khaled | (Mauritius) Shaama Sandooyeea (Mauritius) Aurélie Allet | 14–21, 16–21 | Bronze |

=== African Junior Championships ===
Girls' doubles
| Year | Venue | Partner | Opponent | Score | Result |
|---|---|---|---|---|---|
| 2013 | Staouali Hall, Algiers, Algeria | (Egypt) Toka Elwasary | (South Africa) Lee-Ann de Wet (South Africa) Anri Schoonees | 14–21, 17–21 | Bronze |

=== BWF International Challenge/Series (19 titles, 14 runners-up) ===
Women's singles
| Year | Tournament | Opponent | Score | Result |
|---|---|---|---|---|
| 2013 | Ethiopia International | (Ethiopia) Yerusksew Legssey Tura | 21–9, 22–20 | (gold) Winner |
| 2015 | Egypt International | (Egypt) Hadia Hosny | 16–21, 26–24, 17–21 | (silver) Runner-up |
| 2018 | Cameroon International | (Egypt) Hadia Hosny | 17–21, 21–15, 16–21 | (silver) Runner-up |
| 2019 | Zambia International | (Nigeria) Dorcas Adesokan | 22–20, 18–21, 18–21 | (silver) Runner-up |

Women's doubles
| Year | Tournament | Partner | Opponent | Score | Result |
|---|---|---|---|---|---|
| 2013 | Ethiopia International | (Egypt) Naja Mohamed | (Ethiopia) Getachew Firehiwot (Ethiopia) Yerusksew Legssey Tura | 15–21, 19–21 | (silver) Runner-up |
| 2013 | Morocco International | (Egypt) Naja Mohamed | (Morocco) Harag Nazik (Morocco) Rajae Rochdy | 28–26, 21–13 | (gold) Winner |
| 2015 | Egypt International | (Egypt) Hadia Hosny | (Egypt) Nadine Ashraf (Egypt) Menna Eltanany | 28–26, 21–13 | (gold) Winner |
| 2016 | Botswana International | (Egypt) Hadia Hosny | (Zambia) Evelyn Siamupangila (Zambia) Ogar Siamupangila | 21–16, 21–17 | (gold) Winner |
| 2017 | Uganda International | (Egypt) Hadia Hosny | (Zambia) Evelyn Siamupangila (Zambia) Ogar Siamupangila | 21–10, 21–10 | (gold) Winner |
| 2018 | Algeria International | (Egypt) Hadia Hosny | (Algeria) Halla Bouksani (Algeria) Linda Mazri | 21–19, 21–11 | (gold) Winner |
| 2018 | Uganda International | (Egypt) Hadia Hosny | (Zambia) Evelyn Siamupangila (Zambia) Ogar Siamupangila | 21–17, 21–18 | (gold) Winner |
| 2018 | Cameroon International | (Egypt) Hadia Hosny | (Cameroon) Louise Lisane Mbas (Cameroon) Stella Joel Ngadjui | 21–7, 21–9 | (gold) Winner |
| 2019 | Uganda International | (Egypt) Hadia Hosny | (Iran) Samin Abedkhojasteh (Jordan) Domou Amro | 21–17, 12–21, 24–22 | (gold) Winner |
| 2019 | Kenya International | (Egypt) Hadia Hosny | (Lithuania) Vytaute Fomkinaite (Lithuania) Gerda Voitechovskaja | 15–21, 17–21 | (silver) Runner-up |
| 2019 | Benin International | (Egypt) Hadia Hosny | (Peru) Daniela Macías (Peru) Dánica Nishimura | 19–21, 21–18, 12–21 | (silver) Runner-up |
| 2019 | Côte d'Ivoire International | (Egypt) Hadia Hosny | (Iran) Samin Abedkhojasteh (Iran) Sorayya Aghaei | 20–22, 12–21 | (silver) Runner-up |
| 2019 | Algeria International | (Egypt) Hadia Hosny | (Peru) Daniela Macías (Peru) Dánica Nishimura | 13–21, 10–21 | (silver) Runner-up |
| 2019 | Cameroon International | (Egypt) Hadia Hosny | (Cameroon) Madeleine Carene Leticia Akoumba Ze (Cameroon) Laeticia Guefack Ghomsi | 21–6, 21–3 | (gold) Winner |
| 2019 | Zambia International | (Egypt) Hadia Hosny | (Egypt) Nour Ahmed Youssri (Egypt) Jana Ashraf | 21–9, 21–11 | (gold) Winner |
| 2020 | Kenya International | (Egypt) Hadia Hosny | (Pakistan) Palwasha Bashir (Pakistan) Mahoor Shahzad | 21–13, 21–17 | (gold) Winner |

Mixed doubles
| Year | Tournament | Partner | Opponent | Score | Result |
|---|---|---|---|---|---|
| 2013 | Ethiopia International | (Egypt) Huessin Abdelrahman | (Egypt) Adham Hatem Elgamal (Egypt) Naja Mohamed | 21–14, 21–11 | (gold) Winner |
| 2014 | Zambia International | (Egypt) Ali Ahmed El-Khateeb | (Mauritius) Julien Paul (Mauritius) Kate Foo Kune | 18–21, 14–21 | (silver) Runner-up |
| 2015 | Ethiopia International | (Egypt) Ali Ahmed El-Khateeb | (Egypt) Ahmed Salah (Egypt) Menna Eltanany | 15–21, 16–21 | (silver) Runner-up |
| 2018 | Cameroon International | (Egypt) Adham Hatem Elgamal | (Egypt) Ahmed Salah (Egypt) Hadia Hosny | 13–21, 21–15, 21–15 | (gold) Winner |
| 2019 | Algeria International | (Egypt) Adham Hatem Elgamal | (Belgium) Jona van Nieuwkerke (Belgium) Lise Jaques | 12–21, 20–22 | (silver) Runner-up |
| 2019 | Cameroon International | (Egypt) Adham Hatem Elgamal | (Egypt) Ahmed Salah (Egypt) Hadia Hosny | Walkover | (gold) Winner |
| 2019 | Zambia International | (Egypt) Adham Hatem Elgamal | (Egypt) Ahmed Salah (Egypt) Hadia Hosny | 21–17, 21–17 | (gold) Winner |
| 2019 | South Africa International | (Egypt) Adham Hatem Elgamal | (South Africa) Jarred Elliott (South Africa) Megan de Beer | 21–19, 19–21, 21–17 | (gold) Winner |
| 2020 | Kenya International | (Egypt) Adham Hatem Elgamal | (Kenya) John Wanyoike (Kenya) Mercy Joseph | 21–10, 21–14 | (gold) Winner |
| 2022 | Botswana International | (Egypt) Adham Hatem Elgamal | (South Africa) Jarred Elliott (South Africa) Amy Ackerman | 12–21, 19–21 | (silver) Runner-up |
| 2023 | Benin International | (Egypt) Adham Hatem Elgamal | (Benin) Oswald Fano-Dosh (Benin) Pernelle Fabossou | 21–9, 21–12 | (gold) Winner |
| 2023 | South Africa International | (Egypt) Adham Hatem Elgamal | (South Africa) Robert White (South Africa) Deidre Laurens | 21–10, 17–21, 18–21 | (silver) Runner-up |
| 2026 | Senegal International | (Egypt) Adham Hatem Elgamal | (Ukraine) Yegor Romaniuk (Poland) Kaja Ziolkowska | 14–21, 16–21 | (silver) Runner-up |

BWF International Challenge tournament
BWF International Series tournament
BWF Future Series tournament

=== BWF Junior International (2 titles, 1 runner-up) ===
Girls' singles
| Year | Tournament | Opponent | Score | Result |
|---|---|---|---|---|
| 2013 | Ethiopia U18 International | (Egypt) Naja Mohamed | 21–13, 21–11 | (gold) Winner |
| 2013 | Morocco Junior International | (Egypt) Naja Mohamed | 21–11, 21–16 | (gold) Winner |
| 2013 | Botswana Junior International | (South Africa) Janke van der Vyver | 26–24, 9–21, 13–21 | (silver) Runner-up |

BWF Junior International Grand Prix tournament
BWF Junior International Challenge tournament
BWF Junior International Series tournament
BWF Junior Future Series tournament

== Performance timeline ==
Key

| W | F | SF | QF | #R | RR | Q# | A | G | S | B | NH | N/A | DNQ |

(W) won; (F) finalist; (SF) semi-finalist; (QF) quarter-finalist; (#R) rounds 4, 3, 2, 1; (RR) round-robin stage; (Q#) qualification round; (A) absent; (G) gold, (S) silver or (B) bronze medal; (NH) not held; (N/A) not applicable; (DNQ) did not qualify.
To avoid confusion and double counting, these charts are updated at the conclusion of a tournament or when the player's participation has ended.

=== National team ===
- Junior level

| Team events | 2014 |
|---|---|
| African Youth Games | B |
| World Junior Championships | RR |

- Senior level

| Team events | 2016 | 2017 | 2018 | 2019 | 2020 | 2021 |
|---|---|---|---|---|---|---|
| Africa Team Championships | S | NH | B | NH | G | NH |
| Africa Mixed Team Championships | NH | G | NH | B | NH | G |
| African Games | NH | NH | NH | B | NH | NH |
| Uber Cup | DNQ | NH | DNQ | NH | RR | NH |
| Sudirman Cup | NH | A | NH | A | NH | RR |

=== Individual competitions ===
- Junior level

| Events | 2013 | 2014 |
|---|---|---|
| African Junior Championships | B | |
| African Youth Games | NH | B |
| Youth Olympic Games | NH | RR |

- Senior level

| Events | 2017 | 2018 | 2019 |
|---|---|---|---|
| Mediterranean Games | NH | QF | NH |
