= Kate Foo Kune =

Mauritian badminton player (born 1993)

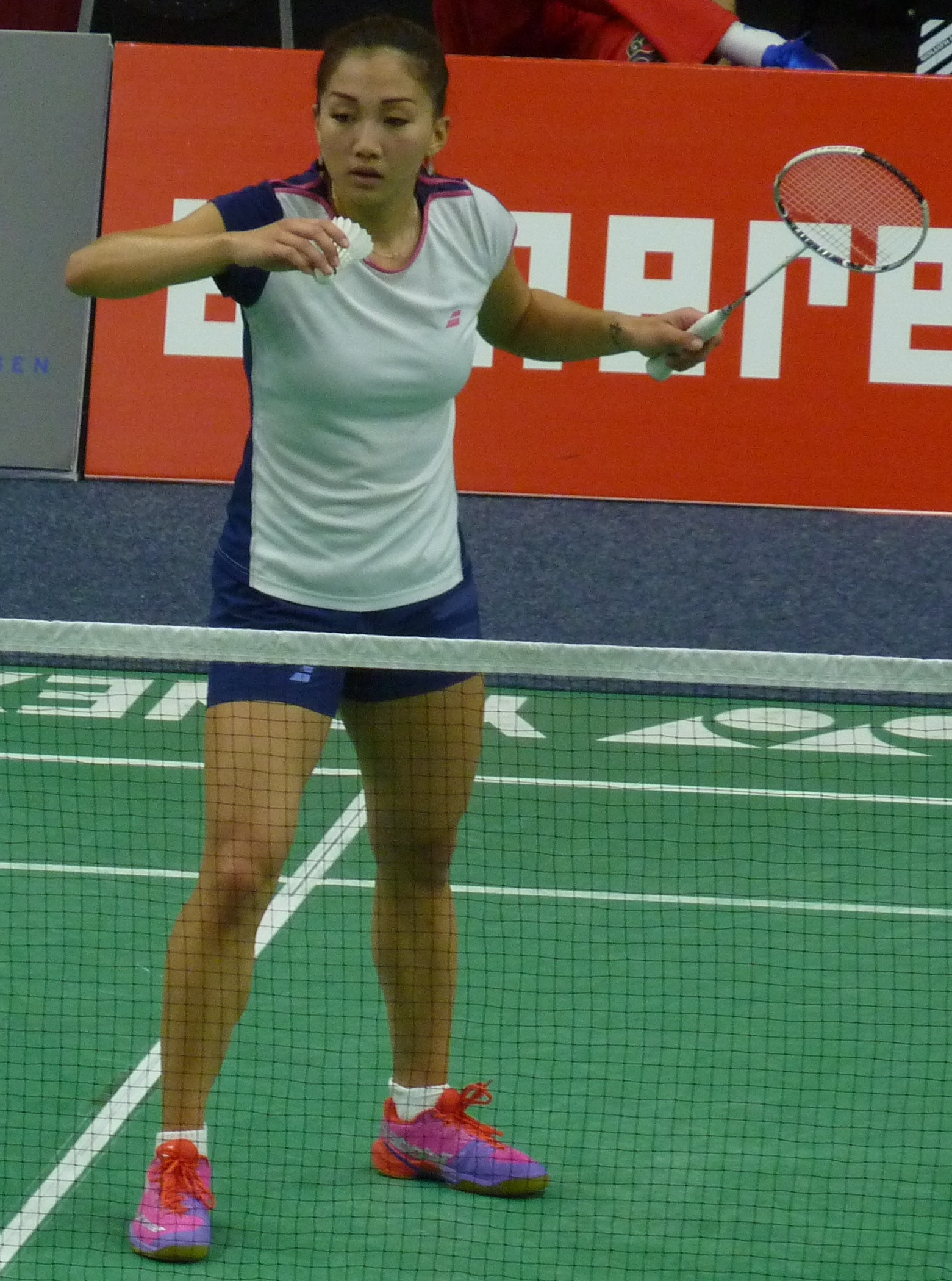

Personal information
- Born: Kate Jessica Kim Lee Foo Kune; 29 March 1993 (age 33) Moka, Mauritius
- Height: 1.62 m (5 ft 4 in)

Sport
- Country: Mauritius
- Sport: Badminton
- Handedness: Left

Women's singles & doubles
- Highest ranking: 57 (WS 21 April 2016); 69 (WD with Karen Foo Kune 5 April 2012); 89 (XD with Julien Paul 12 March 2024)
- Current ranking: 97 (WS); 467 (WD with Kobita Dookhee); 112 (XD with Julien Paul) (16 July 2024)
- BWF profile
Medal record
Women's badminton
Representing Mauritius
African Games
Gold medal – first place	2015 Brazzaville	Women's singles
Gold medal – first place	2015 Brazzaville	Mixed team
Silver medal – second place	2015 Brazzaville	Women's doubles
Bronze medal – third place	2023 Accra	Mixed doubles
African Championships
Gold medal – first place	2014 Gaborone	Women's singles
Gold medal – first place	2014 Gaborone	Women's doubles
Gold medal – first place	2017 Benoni	Women's singles
Gold medal – first place	2018 Algiers	Women's singles
Gold medal – first place	2020 Cairo	Women's singles
Gold medal – first place	2024 Cairo	Women's singles
Silver medal – second place	2013 Rose Hill	Women's singles
Silver medal – second place	2017 Benoni	Mixed doubles
Silver medal – second place	2023 Benoni	Mixed team
Silver medal – second place	2025 Douala	Mixed team
Bronze medal – third place	2011 Marrakesh	Women's doubles
Bronze medal – third place	2011 Marrakesh	Mixed team
Bronze medal – third place	2013 Rose Hill	Mixed team
Bronze medal – third place	2014 Gaborone	Mixed team
Bronze medal – third place	2024 Cairo	Mixed doubles
Africa Team Championships
Gold medal – first place	2016 Rose Hill	Women's team
Gold medal – first place	2018 Algiers	Women's team
Bronze medal – third place	2008 Rose Hill	Women's team
Bronze medal – third place	2012 Addis Ababa	Women's team
Bronze medal – third place	2020 Cairo	Women's team

Kate Jessica Kim Lee Foo Kune (born 29 March 1993) is a badminton player from Mauritius. She began playing badminton in Mauritius at age six. Her first major tournament participation was 2013 BWF World Championships in China, where she lost in the first round of women's singles to Sarah Walker of England. Foo Kune represented her country at the 2016 Summer Olympics in Rio de Janeiro, Brazil. She was the flag bearer for Mauritius during the Parade of Nations. She also competed for Mauritius at the 2024 Summer Olympics.

As a junior player, she won the Under-15 and Under-19 African tournaments. In 2015, she was awarded the Sportswoman of the Year award in Mauritius. In doubles, she partnered with Yeldy Marie Louison, while in mixed doubles, she partnered with Julien Paul. Her career-best ranking remains 63 as of 2016, and her best performance remains the gold at 2015 African games.

== Personal life ==
Kate Foo Kune is the second child of Jacques and Cathy Foo Kune (née Ng), both leading mixed doubles badminton players who several championships, such as the 1985 Indian Ocean Games. The pair were married in 1990 and had two children. Her sister, Karen Foo Kune, is also a professional badminton player and competed at the 2008 Summer Olympics.

Foo Kune pursued her bachelor's degree in sports management while in France.

The sisters were paired and played doubles in the 2010 Commonwealth Games in New Delhi. She has been married to Czech badminton player Milan Ludík since August 2020.

== Professional life ==
Foo Kune started playing badminton at the age of six and turned professional by twelve. She first participated in a junior competition at age 12 in 2005. She had her international debut Thomas and Uber Cup Qualification for Africa in 2010 held at Uganda. She was named Sportswoman of the Year in 2015 in Mauritius. In doubles, she partnered with Yeldy Marie Louison; in mixed doubles, she partnered with Julien Paul. During the early part of her career, she paired with her sister Karen Foo Kune. She finished second during her first outing in the African Badminton Cup of Nations, but a few weeks later, she won the Mauritius International Series. She went on to win the Under-15 and Under-19 African tournaments.

In September 2013, it was reported that she was one of the 14 players selected for the Road to Rio Program, a program that aimed to help African badminton players compete at the 2016 Summer Olympics.

As of 2016, she lived in Paris, France, and joined Issy-Les-Moulineaux Badminton Club. Before this, she trained for four months in Malaysia and Leeds, England.

Foo Kune was part of the Mauritius badminton squad which won the title at the 2016 Africa Continental Team Badminton Championships in February 2016, which also confirms the participation of Mauritius in 2016 Uber Cup. In June 2016, Foo Kune won the 2016 European Badminton Club Championships with her club despite losing in the final to Beatriz Corrales. She was the flagbearer for Mauritius during the Parade of Nations. She won her first match against Wendy Chen Hsuan-Yu of Australia, but was defeated by Porntip Buranaprasertsuk of Thailand and failed to qualify for the next round.

Foo Kune served a two-year competition ban from December 2020 to December 2022 for an anti-doping rule violation in relation to unintentional use of androstenedione following a test at the 2019 African Badminton Championships. Although the Badminton World Federation (BWF) Doping Hearing Panel had earlier ruled that Foo Kune was not a fault and should receive no sanction, the Court of Arbitration for Sport disagreed and imposed the ban following an appeal by BWF.

== Achievements ==
=== All African Games ===
Women's singles
Year	Venue	Opponent	Score	Result
2015	Gymnase Étienne Mongha, Brazzaville, Republic of the Congo	(Nigeria) Grace Gabriel	21–13, 21–19	Gold

Women's doubles
Year	Venue	Partner	Opponent	Score	Result
2015	Gymnase Étienne Mongha; Brazzaville, Republic of the Congo	(Mauritius) Yeldy Louison	(Seychelles) Juliette Ah-Wan (Seychelles) Allisen Camille	20–22, 21–18, 14–21	Silver

Mixed doubles
Year	Venue	Partner	Opponent	Score	Result
2023	Borteyman Sports Complex; Accra, Ghana	(Mauritius) Julien Paul	(Algeria) Koceila Mammeri (Algeria) Tanina Mammeri	13–21, 26–24, 15–21	Bronze

=== African Championships ===
Women's singles
Year	Venue	Opponent	Score	Result
2013	National Badminton Centre, Rose Hill, Mauritius	(Nigeria) Grace Gabriel	23–25, 12–21	Silver
2014	Lobatse Stadium, Gaborone, Botswana	(Nigeria) Grace Gabriel	21–14, 14–21, 21–17	Gold
2017	John Barrable Hall, Benoni, South Africa	(Egypt) Hadia Hosny	16–21, 21–14, 21–8	Gold
2018	Salle OMS Harcha Hacéne, Algiers, Algeria	(Nigeria) Dorcas Ajoke Adesokan	21–16, 21–19	Gold
2019	Alfred Diete-Spiff Centre, Port Harcourt, Nigeria	(Nigeria) Dorcas Ajoke Adesokan	12–21, 13–21	~~Silver~~
2020	Cairo Stadium Hall 2, Cairo, Egypt	(Nigeria) Dorcas Ajoke Adesokan	21–19, 21–16	Gold
2024	Cairo Stadium Indoor Halls Complex, Cairo, Egypt	(Uganda) Fadilah Mohamed Rafi	walkover	Gold

In November 2019, Badminton World Federation released a statement regarding the doping test failure of Kate Foo Kune in this championships and decided to disqualify her result.

Women's doubles
Year	Venue	Partner	Opponent	Score	Result
2011	Marrakesh, Morocco	(Mauritius) Karen Foo Kune	(South Africa) Michelle Edwards (South Africa) Annari Viljoen	21–19, 9–21, 8–21	Bronze
2014	Lobatse Stadium; Gaborone, Botswana	(Mauritius) Yeldy Louison	(Seychelles) Juliette Ah-Wan (Seychelles) Allisen Camille	21–17, 22–20	Gold

Mixed doubles
Year	Venue	Partner	Opponent	Score	Result
2017	John Barrable Hall; Benoni, South Africa	(Mauritius) Julien Paul	(South Africa) Andries Malan (South Africa) Jennifer Fry	19–21, 21–19, 19-21	Silver
2024	Cairo Stadium Indoor Halls Complex, Cairo, Egypt	(Mauritius) Julien Paul	(Algeria) Koceila Mammeri (Algeria) Tanina Mammeri	6–21, 11–21	Bronze

=== BWF International Challenge/Series (13 titles, 11 runners-up) ===
Women's singles
Year	Tournament	Opponent	Score	Result
2013	Mauritius International	(Nigeria) Grace Gabriel	21–18, 16–21, 24–22	(gold) Winner
2014	Morocco International	(Belgium) Lianne Tan	11–7, 9–11, 9–11, 8–11	(silver) Runner-up
2014	Zambia International	(Nigeria) Grace Gabriel	21–16, 21–17	(gold) Winner
2015	Nigeria International	(Nigeria) Grace Gabriel	21–14, 11–21, 12–21	(silver) Runner-up
2015	Zambia International	(Iran) Sorayya Aghaei	15–21, 1–0 retired	(gold) Winner
2015	Botswana International	(Hungary) Laura Sarosi	10–21, 14–21	(silver) Runner-up
2016	Uganda International	(Portugal) Telma Santos	10–21, 12–21	(silver) Runner-up
2016	Norwegian International	(Malaysia) Yap Rui Chen	13–21, 8–21	(silver) Runner-up
2017	Zambia International	(Israel) Ksenia Polikarpova	14–21, 21–16, 21–18	(gold) Winner
2017	South Africa International	(India) Vaishnavi Reddy Jakka	10–21, 10–21	(silver) Runner-up
2018	Uganda International	(Egypt) Hadia Hosny	21–19, 21–10	(gold) Winner
2019	South Africa International	(Italy) Katharina Fink	21–16, 21–14	(gold) Winner
2023	Brazil International	(Italy) Yasmine Hamza	19–21, 21–15, 25–23	(gold) Winner
2023	South Africa International	(Egypt) Nour Ahmed Youssri	21–16, 21–14	(gold) Winner
2023	French Guiana International	(Trinidad and Tobago) Chequeda De Boulet	21–8, 21–4	(gold) Winner

Women's doubles
Year	Tournament	Partner	Opponent	Score	Result
2014	Mauritius International	(Mauritius) Yeldy Louison	(Germany) Annika Horbach (New Zealand) Maria Masinipeni	12–21, 12–21	(silver) Runner-up
2014	Zambia International	(Nigeria) Grace Gabriel	(South Africa) Michelle Butler-Emmett (South Africa) Elme de Villiers	17–21, 21–19, 17–21	(silver) Runner-up

Mixed doubles
Year	Tournament	Partner	Opponent	Score	Result
2014	Hatzor International	(France) Florent Riancho	(Ukraine) Gennadiy Natarov (Ukraine) Yuliya Kazarinova	6–11, 7–11, 11–8, 10–11	(silver) Runner-up
2014	Zambia International	(Mauritius) Julien Paul	(Egypt) Ali Ahmed El-Khateeb (Egypt) Doha Hany	21–18, 21–14	(gold) Winner
2017	Brazil International	(Germany) Jonathan Persson	(Brazil) Hugo Arthuso (Brazil) Fabiana Silva	11–21, 19–21	(silver) Runner-up
2017	Mauritius International	(Germany) Jonathan Persson	(Malaysia) Yogendran Khrishnan (India) Prajakta Sawant	7–21, 17–21	(silver) Runner-up
2017	Zambia International	(Germany) Jonathan Persson	(Israel) Misha Zilberman (Israel) Svetlana Zilberman	Walkover	(gold) Winner
2018	Uganda International	(Germany) Jonathan Persson	(Mauritius) Julien Paul (Mauritius) Aurélie Allet	21–11, 21–18	(gold) Winner
2023	Botswana International	(Mauritius) Julien Paul	(Mauritius) Melvin Appiah (Mauritius) Vilina Appiah	21–10, 21–15	(gold) Winner

BWF International Challenge tournament
BWF International Series tournament
BWF Future Series tournament

== Career overview ==
Singles	Played	Wins	Losses	Balance
Total	329	199	129	+70
Current year (2020)	9	8	1	+7

Women's doubles	Played	Wins	Losses	Balance
Total	100	56	44	+12
Current year (2020)	3	2	1	+1

Mixed doubles	Played	Wins	Losses	Balance
Total	84	44	40	+4
Current year (2020)	0	0	0	0

* Statistics were last updated on 18 February 2020.

Olympic Games
Preceded by Natacha Rigobert	Flagbearer for Mauritius; 2016 Rio de Janeiro	Succeeded by Richarno Colin; Roilya Ranaivosoa
