= Ethiopia International =

International badminton tournament in Ethiopia

The Ethiopia International is an international badminton tournament established in 2011, held in Addis Ababa, Ethiopia, and rated as BWF Future Series event. The 2011 tournament points used as a qualification for the players to compete at the London Olympic Games. In 2014, the tournament level-up to International Series, with total prize money US$ 5.000 The tournament is aimed at evaluating and improving the stage and performance of players; and also to show the image of Ethiopia.

== Previous winners ==
Year	Men's singles	Women's singles	Men's doubles	Women's doubles	Mixed doubles	Notes
2018	cancelled					
2017	(Israel) Misha Zilberman	(Sri Lanka) Lekha Shehani	(India) Arjun M.R. (India) Ramchandran Shlok	(Sri Lanka) Waduthantri Kavindika Binari De Silva (Sri Lanka) Lekha Shehani	(Israel) Misha Zilberman (Israel) Svetlana Zilberman	Ethiopia International; BWF International Series
2016	(Italy) Rosario Maddaloni	(Egypt) Menna Eltanany	(Italy) Matteo Bellucci (Italy) Fabio Caponio	(Italy) Silvia Garino (Italy) Lisa Iversen	(Egypt) Ahmed Salah (Egypt) Menna Eltanany	Ethiopia International; BWF International Series
2015	(Israel) Misha Zilberman	(Turkey) Cemre Fere	(South Africa) Andries Malan (South Africa) Wiaan Viljoen	(Turkey) Cemre Fere (Turkey) Ebru Yazgan	(Egypt) Ahmed Salah (Egypt) Menna Eltanany	Ethiopia International; BWF International Series
2014	(Israel) Misha Zilberman	(Nigeria) Grace Gabriel	(Austria) Vilson Vattanirappel (Austria) Luka Wraber	(Zambia) Evelyn Siamupangila (Zambia) Ogar Siamupangila	(Slovakia) Matej Hliničan (Uganda) Shamim Bangi	Ethiopia International; BWF International Series
2013	(Zambia) Chongo Mulenga	(Egypt) Doha Hany	(Egypt) Huessin Abdelrahman (Egypt) Adham Hatem Elgamal	(Ethiopia) Firehiwot Getachew (Ethiopia) Yerusksew Legssey Tura	(Egypt) Huessin Abdelrahman (Egypt) Doha Hany	Ethiopia International; BWF Future Series
2012	(Czech Republic) Jan Fröhlich	(Uganda) Shamim Bangi	(Ethiopia) Teera Reta (Ethiopia) Asnake Getachew Sahilu	(Ethiopia) Firehiwot Getachew (Ethiopia) Yerusksew Legssey Tura	(Ethiopia) Asnake Getachew Sahilu (Ethiopia) Ayelech Yakob	Ethiopia International; BWF Future Series
2011	(Iran) Ali Shahhosseini	(Australia) Victoria Na	(Ethiopia) Ermiyas Tamarat Degefe (Ethiopia) Asnake Sahilu	(Egypt) Hadia Hosny (Morocco) Rajae Rochdy	(Croatia) Luka Zdenjak (Morocco) Rajae Rochdy	Ethiopia International; BWF Future Series
