= Zambia International =

The Zambia International is an international badminton tournament held in Lusaka, Zambia. The event is part of the Badminton World Federation's International Series and part of the Badminton Confederation of Africa's circuit.

== Past winners ==
Year	Men's singles	Women's singles	Men's doubles	Women's doubles	Mixed doubles	Ref
1965	(Zambia) Eric Selley	(Zambia) Merle Moult	(Zambia) Brian Brummage (Zambia) Eric Selley	(Zambia) Merle Moult (Zambia) Ingrid Owen	(Zambia) Eric Selley (Zambia) Merle Moult	
1966	(Zambia) Eric Selley	(Zambia) Merle Moult	(Zambia) Brian Brummage (Zambia) Eric Selley	(Zambia) Merle Moult (Zambia) Ingrid Owen	(Zambia) Eric Selley (Zambia) Merle Moult	
1967	(Zambia) Ken Brann	(Zambia) Merle Moult	(Zambia) Ken Brann (Zambia) Suren Parulekar	(Zambia) Annabelle Charlton (Zambia) Merle Moult	(Zambia) Brian Brummage (Zambia) Nancy MacIntyre	
1968	(Zambia) B. Balneaves	(Zambia) Harriet van Heerden	(Zambia) Keith Pickersgill (Zambia) Eric Selley	(Zambia) Ida Buck (Zambia) I. Leys	(Zambia) Eric Selley (Zambia) Merle Moult	
1969	(Zambia) Keith Pickersgill	(Zambia) Merle Moult	(Zambia) Keith Pickersgill (Zambia) Eric Selley	(Zambia) Merle Moult (Zambia) Isobel Winter	(Zambia) Eric Selley (Zambia) Merle Moult	
1970	(Zambia) Andrew McFee	(Zambia) Merle Moult	(Zambia) Andrew McFee (Zambia) Surin Parulekar	(Zambia) Merle Moult (Zambia) Isobel Winter	(Zambia) Surin Parulekar (Zambia) Merle Moult	
1971– 1972	No data					
1973	(Denmark) Heine Jørgensen	(Zambia) M. Chinyama	(Denmark) Heine Jørgensen (Zambia) Vishnu Kapil	(Zambia) Tina Kotze (Zambia) Maureen Guy	(Denmark) Heine Jørgensen (Zambia) Maureen Guy	
1974– 1976	No data					
1977	(Nigeria) Monday Edo	(Zambia) Christine Nyahoda	(Tanzania) Raju Chiplukar (Tanzania) Arun Jobanputra	(Zambia) Teresa Koloko (Zambia) Christine Nyahoda	(Kenya) Vijai Maini (Kenya) Chris Maskell	
1978– 1981	No data					
1982	(Tanzania) Mukesh Shah	No data				
1983– 2013	No data					
2014	(Uganda) Edwin Ekiring	(Mauritius) Kate Foo Kune	(Italy) Giovanni Greco (Italy) Rosario Maddaloni	(South Africa) Michelle Butler-Emmett (South Africa) Elme de Villiers	(Mauritius) Julien Paul (Mauritius) Kate Foo Kune	
2015	(Iran) Soroush Eskandari	(Mauritius) Kate Foo Kune	(South Africa) Andries Malan (South Africa) Willem Viljoen	(Egypt) Nadine Ashraf (Egypt) Menna El-Tanany	(Egypt) Abdelrahman Kashkal (Egypt) Hadia Hosny	
2016	(Belgium) Maxime Moreels	(Egypt) Menna El-Tanany	(Mauritius) Aatish Lubah (Mauritius) Julien Paul	(Zambia) Evelyn Siamupangila (Zambia) Ogar Siamupangila	(Egypt) Ahmed Salah (Egypt) Menna El-Tanany	
2017	(Israel) Misha Zilberman	(Mauritius) Kate Foo Kune	(Mauritius) Aatish Lubah (Mauritius) Julien Paul	(Italy) Silvia Garino (Italy) Lisa Iversen	(Germany) Jonathan Persson (Mauritius) Kate Foo Kune	
2018	(Azerbaijan) Ade Resky Dwicahyo	(Nigeria) Dorcas Ajoke Adesokan	(Azerbaijan) Ade Resky Dwicahyo (Azerbaijan) Azmy Qowimuramadhoni	(Zambia) Evelyn Siamupangila (Zambia) Ogar Siamupangila	(Nigeria) Anuoluwapo Juwon Opeyori (Nigeria) Dorcas Ajoke Adesokan	
2019	(United States) Timothy Lam	(Nigeria) Dorcas Ajoke Adesokan	(Egypt) Adham Hatem Elgamal (Egypt) Ahmed Salah	(Egypt) Doha Hany (Egypt) Hadia Hosny	(Egypt) Adham Hatem Elgamal (Egypt) Doha Hany	
2020	Cancelled (Note: This tournament, originally to be played from 26 to 29 November, was later cancelled due to the COVID-19 pandemic in Zambia.)					
2021	Not held					
2022	(Kazakhstan) Dmitriy Panarin	(Azerbaijan) Keisha Fatimah Azzahra	(South Africa) Jarred Elliott (South Africa) Robert Summers	(Azerbaijan) Keisha Fatimah Azzahra (Azerbaijan) Era Maftuha	(Jordan) Bahaedeen Ahmad Alshannik (Jordan) Domou Amro	
2023	(Mexico) Luis Ramón Garrido	(France) Malya Hoareau	(Algeria) Koceila Mammeri (Algeria) Youcef Sabri Medel	(South Africa) Amy Ackerman (South Africa) Deidre Laurens	(Algeria) Koceila Mammeri (Algeria) Tanina Mammeri	
2024	(Kazakhstan) Dmitriy Panarin	(Azerbaijan) Era Maftuha	(Azerbaijan) Agil Gabilov (Azerbaijan) Dicky Dwi Pangestu	(Maldives) Aminath Abdul Razzaq (Maldives) Fathimath Abdul Razzaq	(Azerbaijan) Agil Gabilov (Azerbaijan) Era Maftuha	
2025	(United Arab Emirates) Shashaank Sai Munnangi	(Italy) Yasmine Hamza	(India) Anuj Kale (India) Ian Lopes	(South Africa) Amy Ackerman (South Africa) Johanita Scholtz	(Maldives) Hussein Shaheed (Maldives) Fathimath Nabaaha Abdul Razzaq	
2026	(India) Manav Choudhary	(Myanmar) Thet Htar Thuzar	(United Arab Emirates) Bharath Latheesh (United Arab Emirates) Dev Vishnu	(South Africa) Amy Ackerman (South Africa) Johanita Scholtz	(Slovenia) Miha Ivančič (Slovenia) Anja Jordan	

== Performances by nation ==
As of the 2026 edition

Pos	Nation	MS	WS	MD	WD	XD	Total
1	Azerbaijan	1	2	2	1	1	7
1	Egypt	0	1	1	2	3	7
3	Mauritius	0	3	2	0	1.5	6.5
4	South Africa	0	0	2	4	0	6
5	Italy	0	1	1	1	0	3
5	Nigeria	0	2	0	0	1	3
7	Algeria	0	0	1	0	1	2
7	India	1	0	1	0	0	2
7	Kazakhstan	2	0	0	0	0	2
7	Maldives	0	0	0	1	1	2
7	United Arab Emirates	1	0	1	0	0	2
7	Zambia*	0	0	0	2	0	2
13	Belgium	1	0	0	0	0	1
13	France	0	1	0	0	0	1
13	Iran	1	0	0	0	0	1
13	Israel	1	0	0	0	0	1
13	Jordan	0	0	0	0	1	1
13	Mexico	1	0	0	0	0	1
13	Myanmar	0	1	0	0	0	1
13	Slovenia	0	0	0	0	1	1
13	Uganda	1	0	0	0	0	1
13	United States	1	0	0	0	0	1
23	Germany	0	0	0	0	0.5	0.5
Total		11	11	11	11	11	55

* Host nation
