= 2014 India Super Series =

Tournament details
- Dates: 1—6 April 2014
- Level: Super Series
- Total prize money: US$250,000
- Venue: Siri Fort Indoor Stadium
- Location: New Delhi, India

Champions
- Men's singles: (Malaysia) Lee Chong Wei
- Women's singles: (China) Wang Shixian
- Men's doubles: (Denmark) Mathias Boe (Denmark) Carsten Mogensen
- Women's doubles: (China) Tang Yuanting (China) Yu Yang
- Mixed doubles: (Denmark) Joachim Fischer Nielsen (Denmark) Christinna Pedersen

The 2014 India Super Series was the fourth super series tournament of the 2014 BWF Super Series. The tournament took place in New Delhi, India from 1–6 April 2014 and had a total purse of $250,000. A qualification was held to fill four places in both singles events and Men's doubles of the main draws.

== Men's singles ==
=== Seeds ===
1. (Malaysia) Lee Chong Wei
2. (China) Chen Long
3. (Japan) Kenichi Tago
4. (Denmark) Jan Ø. Jørgensen
5. (Thailand) Boonsak Ponsana
6. (China) Wang Zhengming
7. (China) Du Pengyu
8. (South Korea) Shon Wan-ho

=== Top half ===
First Round
1	(Malaysia) Lee C W	21	21
Q1	(India) A Kumar K.	9	9
(India) S Varma	21	17	21
(Russia) V Ivanov	16	21	14
6	(China) Wang ZM	12	21	12
(India) P Kashyap	21	17	21
(Chinese Taipei) Chou T-c	17	21	17
(India) R.M.V.Gurusai D	21	16	21
PFQ	(Israel) M Zilberman	12	12
(Denmark) V Axelsen	21	21
Q3	(Thailand) S Avihingsanon	21	21
Q2	(India) A Sridhar	13	10
7	(China) Du PY	16	21	21
(India) B S Praneeth	21	10	19
(Malaysia) Chong W F	12	21	19
(Japan) S Sasaki	21	15	21

Second Round
1	(Malaysia) Lee C W	21	21
(India) S Varma	9	6
(India) P Kashyap	21	16	21
(India) R.M.V.Gurusai D	15	21	11
(Denmark) V Axelsen	21	23
Q3	(Thailand) S Avihingsanon	13	21
7	(China) Du PY	21	21
(Japan) S Sasaki	19	17

Quarterfinals
1	(Malaysia) Lee C W	21	21
(India) P Kashyap	15	13
(Denmark) V Axelsen	11	24	19
7	(China) Du PY	21	22	21

Semifinals
1	(Malaysia) Lee C W	21	19	21
7	(China) Du PY	17	21	14

=== Bottom half ===
First Round
(India) K. Srikanth	18	18
(Japan) T Ueda	21	21
(Chinese Taipei) Hsu J-h	12	14
8	(South Korea) Shon W-h	21	21
(South Korea) Lee D-k	18	21	21
(Thailand) T Saensomboonsuk	21	19	13
(India) A Pawar	19	21	6
4	(Denmark) J Ø Jørgensen	21	19	21
(Japan) K Momota	19	14
(Denmark) H-K Vittinghus	21	21
(Indonesia) D H Rumbaka	21	21
PFQ	(Russia) Vladimir Malkov	12	17
Q4	(India) A Sridhar	15	21	13
(France) B Leverdez	21	22	21
(India) Prannoy H.S.	15	9
2	(China) Chen L	21	21

Second Round
(Japan) T Ueda	12	21	21
8	(South Korea) Shon W-h	21	15	19
(South Korea) Lee D-k	16	11
4	(Denmark) J Ø Jørgensen	21	21
(Denmark) H-K Vittinghus	18	21	21
(Indonesia) D H Rumbaka	21	21	13
(France) B Leverdez	16	15
2	(China) Chen L	21	21

Quarterfinals
(Japan) T Ueda	11	13
4	(Denmark) J Ø Jørgensen	21	21
(Denmark) H-K Vittinghus	17	15
2	(China) Chen L	21	21

Semifinals
4	(Denmark) J Ø Jørgensen	15	23	19
2	(China) Chen L	21	21	21

=== Finals ===
Semifinals
1	(Malaysia) Lee Chong Wei	21	19	21
7	(China) Du Pengyu	17	21	14
4	(Denmark) Jan Ø. Jørgensen	15	23	19
2	(China) Chen Long	21	21	21

Final
1	(Malaysia) Lee Chong Wei	21	21
2	(China) Chen Long	13	17

== Women's singles ==
=== Seeds ===
1. (China) Li Xuerui (Final)
2. (China) Wang Shixian (Champion)
3. (China) Wang Yihan (Semifinal)
4. (Thailand) Ratchanok Intanon
5. (South Korea) Bae Yeon-ju
6. (South Korea) Sung Ji-hyun
7. (Chinese Taipei) Tai Tzu-ying
8. (India) Saina Nehwal

=== Top half ===
First Round
1	(China) Li XR	21	21
(Japan) E Hirose	13	10
(Russia) K Polikarpova	11	12
(Thailand) N Jindapon	21	21
5	(South Korea) Bae Y-j	23	19	21
(Chinese Taipei) Pai H-m	21	21	16
(India) T Lad	17	10
Q2	(India) S Gokhale	21	21
PFQ	(Sweden) M Petersen	11	11
(Indonesia) A Yuswandari	21	21
(India) T Murgunde	24	12	21
Q3	(India) M Dhainje	22	21	18
7	(Chinese Taipei) Tai T-y	16	19
(China) Yao X	21	21
Q1	(India) S Mundada	12	8
Q4	(China) Liu X	21	21

Second Round
1	(China) Li XR	19	21	21
(Thailand) N Jindapon	21	17	16
5	(South Korea) Bae Y-j	21	21
Q2	(India) S Gokhale	15	8
(Indonesia) A Yuswandari	21	21
(India) T Murgunde	13	12
(China) Yao X	16	15
Q4	(China) Liu X	21	21

Quarterfinals
1	(China) Li XR	21	21
5	(South Korea) Bae Y-j	7	15
(Indonesia) A Yuswandari	15	8
Q4	(China) Liu X	21	21

Semifinals
1	(China) Li XR	21	21
Q4	(China) Liu X	12	13

=== Bottom half ===
First Round
(New Zealand) A Rankin	13	15
(Thailand) N Saengchote	21	21
(Austria) S Prutsch	7	9
8	(India) S Nehwal	21	21
(Japan) S Uchida	21	17	21
(India) P. C. Thulasi	18	21	18
(Thailand) P Buranaprasertsuk	19	20
3	(China) Wang YH	21	22
(Japan) M Mitani	21	21
(India) S Rane	16	8
(Russia) A Chervaykova	12	13
6	(South Korea) Sung J-h	21	21
(India) A Pantawane	12	12
(Japan) S Takahashi	21	21
(India) P.V. Sindhu	15	21	10
2	(China) Wang SX	21	12	21

Second Round
(Thailand) N Saengchote	15	12
8	(India) S Nehwal	21	21
(Japan) S Uchida	8	21	12
3	(China) Wang YH	21	13	21
(Japan) M Mitani	17	15
6	(South Korea) Sung J-h	21	21
(Japan) S Takahashi	17	22	12
2	(China) Wang SX	21	20	21

Quarterfinals
8	(India) S Nehwal	16	14
3	(China) Wang YH	21	21
6	(South Korea) Sung J-h	13	21	17
2	(China) Wang SX	21	17	21

Semifinals
3	(China) Wang YH	21	7	20
2	(China) Wang SX	15	21	22

=== Finals ===
Semifinals
1	(China) Li Xuerui	21	21
Q4	(China) Liu Xin	12	13
3	(China) Wang Yihan	21	7	20
2	(China) Wang Shixian	15	21	22

Final
1	(China) Li Xuerui	20	19
2	(China) Wang Shixian	22	21

== Men's doubles ==
=== Seeds ===
1. (Japan) Hiroyuki Endo / Kenichi Hayakawa
2. (Denmark) Mathias Boe / Carsten Mogensen
3. (China) Liu Xiaolong / Qiu Zihan
4. (Indonesia) Angga Pratama / Rian Agung Saputro
5. (Malaysia) Hoon Thien How / Tan Wee Kiong
6. (South Korea) Kim Sa-rang / Yoo Yeon-seong
7. (South Korea) Ko Sung-hyun / Shin Baek-cheol
8. (Japan) Takeshi Kamura / Keigo Sonoda

=== Top half ===
First Round
1	(Japan) H Endo (Japan) K Hayakawa	15	21	21
(India) P J Chopra (India) A Dewalker	21	11	13
(Indonesia) W Nayaka (Indonesia) A Yusuf	21	21
PFQ	(India) S. Sanjeeth (India) J Yadav	13	13
5	(Malaysia) Hoon T H (Malaysia) Tan W K	6	18
(China) Kang J (China) Liu C	21	21
PFQ	(India) K T Rupesh K (India) S Thomas	13	12
(Japan) H Hashimoto (Japan) N Hirata	21	21
3	(China) Liu XL (China) Qiu ZH	21	21
Q4	(India) G Prasad (India) V Prasad	13	8
(Australia) R Middleton (Australia) R Smith	21	21
(Thailand) W Ampunsuwan (Thailand) P Chalardchaleam	19	17
6	(South Korea) Kim S-r (South Korea) Yoo Y-s	18	22	21
(Indonesia) F Kurniawan (Indonesia) B Septano	21	20	13
Q1	(India) T Kona (India) J Sanyal	13	12
Q3	(China) Fu HF (China) Zhang N	21	21

Second Round
1	(Japan) H Endo (Japan) K Hayakawa	21	17	21
(Indonesia) W Nayaka (Indonesia) A Yusuf	15	21	16
(China) Kang J (China) Liu C	15	21	15
(Japan) H Hashimoto (Japan) N Hirata	21	18	21
3	(China) Liu XL (China) Qiu ZH	21	21
(Australia) R Middleton (Australia) R Smith	11	6
6	(South Korea) Kim S-r (South Korea) Yoo Y-s	25	21	15
Q3	(China) Fu HF (China) Zhang N	27	19	21

Quarterfinals
1	(Japan) H Endo (Japan) K Hayakawa	21	21	21
(Japan) H Hashimoto (Japan) N Hirata	15	23	18
3	(China) Liu XL (China) Qiu ZH
Q3	(China) Fu HF (China) Zhang N	w	/	o

Semifinals
1	(Japan) H Endo (Japan) K Hayakawa	19	19
3	(China) Liu XL (China) Qiu ZH	21	21

=== Bottom half ===
First Round
(Chinese Taipei) Cheng H-l (Chinese Taipei) Lu C-p	21	21
Q2	(India) A George (India) S Ravuri	13	9
(Malaysia) M Z A Latif (Malaysia) M F M Tazari
8	(Japan) T Kamura (Japan) K Sonoda	w	/	0
(Thailand) M Jongjit (Thailand) N Puangpuapech	21	21
(Australia) R Tam (Australia) G Warfe	12	15
(Chinese Taipei) Liang J-w (Chinese Taipei) Liao K-h	17	21	12
4	(Indonesia) A Pratama (Indonesia) R A Saputro	21	16	21
(India) M Attri (India) B S Reddy	19	19
(Malaysia) Goh V S (Malaysia) Lim K W	21	21
(Indonesia) B Angriawan (Indonesia) R K Suwardi	13	21	14
7	(South Korea) Ko S-h (South Korea) Shin B-c	21	12	21
(Indonesia) M F Gideon (Indonesia) M Kido	14	21	12
(Denmark) M Conrad-Petersn (Denmark) M Pieler Kolding	21	19	21
(Malaysia) Ow Y H (Malaysia) Tan B H	17	14
2	(Denmark) M Boe (Denmark) C Mogensen	21	21

Second Round
(Chinese Taipei) Cheng H-l (Chinese Taipei) Lu C-p	21	20	21
8	(Japan) T Kamura (Japan) K Sonoda	13	22	19
(Thailand) M Jongjit (Thailand) N Puangpuapech	17	21	21
4	(Indonesia) A Pratama (Indonesia) R A Saputro	21	14	18
(Malaysia) Goh V S (Malaysia) Lim K W	18	21	16
7	(South Korea) Ko S-h (South Korea) Shin B-c	21	15	21
(Denmark) M Conrad-Petersn (Denmark) M Pieler Kolding	15	17
2	(Denmark) M Boe (Denmark) C Mogensen	21	21

Quarterfinals
(Chinese Taipei) Cheng H-l (Chinese Taipei) Lu C-p	14	17
(Thailand) M Jongjit (Thailand) N Puangpuapech	21	21
7	(South Korea) Ko S-h (South Korea) Shin B-c	12	15
2	(Denmark) M Boe (Denmark) C Mogensen	21	21

Semifinals
(Thailand) M Jongjit (Thailand) N Puangpuapech	15	15
2	(Denmark) M Boe (Denmark) C Mogensen	21	21

=== Finals ===
Semifinals
1	(Japan) Hiroyuki Endo (Japan) Kenichi Hayakawa	19	19
3	(China) Liu Xiaolong (China) Qiu Zihan	21	21
(Thailand) Maneepong Jongjit (Thailand) Nipitphon Puangpuapech	15	15
2	(Denmark) Mathias Boe (Denmark) Carsten Mogensen	21	21

Final
3	(China) Liu Xiaolong (China) Qiu Zihan	21	15	15
2	(Denmark) Mathias Boe (Denmark) Carsten Mogensen	17	21	21

== Women's doubles ==
=== Seeds ===
1. (Denmark) Christinna Pedersen / Kamilla Rytter Juhl
2. (Japan) Misaki Matsutomo / Ayaka Takahashi
3. (China) Bao Yixin / Tang Jinhua
4. (South Korea) Jang Ye-na / Kim So-young
5. (China) Tian Qing / Zhao Yunlei
6. (China) Ma Jin / Wang Xiaoli
7. (Indonesia) Pia Zebadiah Bernadeth / Rizki Amelia Pradipta
8. (Japan) Reika Kakiiwa / Miyuki Maeda

=== Top half ===
First Round
1	(Denmark) C Pedersen (Denmark) K Rytter Juhl	21	21
(Russia) I Khlebko (Russia) K Polikarpova	11	7
(India) P Sawant (India) A S Sunil
Q1	(India) D Nair (India) M Sahdev	w	/	o
5	(China) Tian Q (China) Zhao YL	21	21
(New Zealand) A Rankin (New Zealand) M Stapleton	7	8
(India) J Gutta (India) A Ponnappa	21	17	21
(Thailand) C Chaladchalam (Thailand) P Munkitamorn	19	21	14
4	(South Korea) Jang Y-n (South Korea) Kim S-y	13	21	16
(Indonesia) A S Awanda (Indonesia) D D Haris	21	11	21
(South Korea) Jung K-e (South Korea) Kim H-n	21	21
(Malaysia) A A Anscelly (Malaysia) Soong F C	7	17
7	(Indonesia) P Z Bernadeth (Indonesia) R A Pradipta	21	16	14
(Thailand) D Aroonkesorn (Thailand) K Voravichitchaikul	14	21	21
(Malaysia) Hoo V K M (Malaysia) Woon K W	21	21
PFQ	(Thailand) P Muenwong (Thailand) K Ostermeyer	17	10

Second Round
1	(Denmark) C Pedersen (Denmark) K Rytter Juhl	21	21
Q1	(India) D Nair (India) M Sahdev	4	9
5	(China) Tian Q (China) Zhao YL	21	21
(India) J Gutta (India) A Ponnappa	13	19
(Indonesia) A S Awanda (Indonesia) D D Haris	19	10
(South Korea) Jung K-e (South Korea) Kim H-n	21	21
(Thailand) D Aroonkesorn (Thailand) K Voravichitchaikul	14	21	14
(Malaysia) Hoo V K M (Malaysia) Woon K W	21	18	21

Quarterfinals
1	(Denmark) C Pedersen (Denmark) K Rytter Juhl	21	10	21
5	(China) Tian Q (China) Zhao YL	12	21	17
(South Korea) Jung K-e (South Korea) Kim H-n	21	21
(Malaysia) Hoo V K M (Malaysia) Woon K W	9	17

Semifinals
1	(Denmark) C Pedersen (Denmark) K Rytter Juhl	18	18
(South Korea) Jung K-e (South Korea) Kim H-n	21	21

=== Bottom half ===
First Round
(Chinese Taipei) Cheng W-h (Chinese Taipei) Hsieh P-c	23	17	21
(Thailand) J Kittiharakul (Thailand) R Prajongjai	21	21	13
Q3	(India) S Ghorpade (India) K. Maneesha	11	16
8	(Japan) R Kakiiwa (Japan) M Maeda	21	21
Q2	(Indonesia) S R Andini (Indonesia) T R Nuraidah	12	16
(China) Tang YT (China) Yu Y	21	21
(Japan) M Aratama (Japan) M Taruno	21	21
PFQ	(Thailand) N Saengchote (Thailand) S Suwannakitborihan	14	16
(India) P Gadre (India) N S Reddy	13	16
(South Korea) Go A-r (South Korea) Yoo H-w	21	21
(Indonesia) N K Maheswari (Indonesia) G Polii	21	13	18
6	(China) Ma J (China) Wang XL	16	21	21
(South Korea) Lee S-h (South Korea) Shin S-c	17	21	21
(Thailand) P Supajirakul (Thailand) S Taerattanachai	21	13	18
Q4	(India) T Dahiya (India) M Singh	4	2
2	(Japan) M Matsutomo (Japan) A Takahashi	21	21

Second Round
(Chinese Taipei) Cheng W-h (Chinese Taipei) Hsieh P-c	21	21
8	(Japan) R Kakiiwa (Japan) M Maeda	18	15
(China) Tang YT (China) Yu Y	20	21	18
(Japan) M Aratama (Japan) M Taruno	22	10	18
(South Korea) Go A-r (South Korea) Yoo H-w	12	15
6	(China) Ma J (China) Wang XL	21	21
(South Korea) Lee S-h (South Korea) Shin S-c	15	19
2	(Japan) M Matsutomo (Japan) A Takahashi	21	21

Quarterfinals
(Chinese Taipei) Cheng W-h (Chinese Taipei) Hsieh P-c	21	12	15
(China) Tang YT (China) Yu Y	15	21	21
6	(China) Ma J (China) Wang XL	21	21
2	(Japan) M Matsutomo (Japan) A Takahashi	13	18

Semifinals
(China) Tang YT (China) Yu Y	21	21
6	(China) Ma J (China) Wang XL	16	19

=== Finals ===
Semifinals
1	(Denmark) Christinna Pedersen (Denmark) Kamilla Rytter Juhl	18	18
(South Korea) Jung Kyung-eun (South Korea) Kim Ha-na	21	21
(China) Tang Yuanting (China) Yu Yang	21	21
6	(China) Ma Jin (China) Wang Xiaoli	16	19

Final
(South Korea) Jung Kyung-eun (South Korea) Kim Ha-na	10	21	16
(China) Tang Yuanting (China) Yu Yang	21	13	21

== Mixed doubles ==
=== Seeds ===
1. (China) Zhang Nan / Zhao Yunlei
2. (Indonesia) Tontowi Ahmad / Lilyana Natsir
3. (Denmark) Joachim Fischer Nielsen / Christinna Pedersen
4. (South Korea) Ko Sung-hyun / Kim Ha-na
5. (Thailand) Sudket Prapakamol / Saralee Thoungthongkam
6. (Indonesia) Markis Kido / Pia Zebadiah Bernadeth
7. (Indonesia) Riky Widianto / Puspita Richi Dili
8. (Japan) Kenichi Hayakawa / Misaki Matsutomo

=== Top half ===
First Round
1	(China) Zhang N (China) Zhao YL	21	21
(Indonesia) M F Gideon (Indonesia) R A Pradipta	11	12
(Chinese Taipei) Chen H-l (Chinese Taipei) Cheng W-h	21	21
(India) A Naimpally (India) T Murgunde	14	5
6	(Indonesia) M Kido (Indonesia) P Z Bernadeth	21	21
Q3	(Malaysia) L Abdul Khalid (Malaysia) Soong FC	17	11
Q4	(Japan) T Kamura (Japan) M Aratama	24	18
PFQ	(Indonesia) P Jordan (Indonesia) D Susanto	26	21
3	(Denmark) J Fischer Nielsen (Denmark) C Pedersen	21	21
(Thailand) N Puangpuapech (Thailand) P Supajirakul	8	13
(China) Kang J (China) Tang YT	21	21
(India) G Venkat (India) J Dewangan	9	5
5	(Thailand) S Prapakamol (Thailand) S Thoungthongkam	21	20	21
(India) P J Chopra (India) K. Maneesha	8	22	16
(India) T Kona (India) A Ponnappa	16	19
(Thailand) M Jongjit (Thailand) S Taerattanachai	21	21

Second Round
1	(China) Zhang N (China) Zhao YL	21	21
(Chinese Taipei) Chen H-l (Chinese Taipei) Cheng W-h	14	13
6	(Indonesia) M Kido (Indonesia) P Z Bernadeth	19	14
PFQ	(Indonesia) P Jordan (Indonesia) D Susanto	21	21
3	(Denmark) J Fischer Nielsen (Denmark) C Pedersen	21	21
(China) Kang J (China) Tang YT	17	13
5	(Thailand) S Prapakamol (Thailand) S Thoungthongkam	21	21	21
(Thailand) M Jongjit (Thailand) S Taerattanachai	18	23	18

Quarterfinals
1	(China) Zhang N (China) Zhao YL	19	21	21
PFQ	(Indonesia) P Jordan (Indonesia) D Susanto	21	10	13
3	(Denmark) J Fischer Nielsen (Denmark) C Pedersen	21	21
5	(Thailand) S Prapakamol (Thailand) S Thoungthongkam	17	5

Semifinals
1	(China) Zhang N (China) Zhao YL	21	6	18
3	(Denmark) J Fischer Nielsen (Denmark) C Pedersen	14	21	21

=== Bottom half ===
First Round
(India) A Dewalker (India) P Gadre	16	13
(South Korea) Shin B-c (South Korea) Eom H-w	21	21
Q1	(Malaysia) Chan P S (Malaysia) Lai P J	21	8	23
8	(Japan) K Hayakawa (Japan) M Matsutomo	15	21	21
Q2	(India) K Singh (India) Chitraleka	11	8
(Denmark) A Kristiansen (Denmark) J Houmann	21	21
(India) A Ahlawat (India) K Das
4	(South Korea) Ko S-h (South Korea) Kim H-n	w	/	0
(South Korea) Yoo Y-s (South Korea) Jang Y-n	17	15
(Denmark) M Pieler Kolding (Denmark) K Rytter Juhl	21	21
PFQ	(Thailand) W Ampunsuwan (Thailand) J Kittiharakul	12	18
7	(Indonesia) R Widianto (Indonesia) P R Dili	21	21
(China) Lu K (China) Huang YQ	21	21
(India) A Vishnu (India) A Balan	13	11
(Japan) H Hashimoto (Japan) M Maeda	13	9
2	(Indonesia) T Ahmad (Indonesia) L Natsir	21	21

Second Round
(South Korea) Shin B-c (South Korea) Eom H-w	15	10
Q1	(Malaysia) Chan P S (Malaysia) Lai P J	21	21
(Denmark) A Kristiansen (Denmark) J Houmann	10	21	18
4	(South Korea) Ko S-h (South Korea) Kim H-n	21	18	21
(Denmark) M Pieler Kolding (Denmark) K Rytter Juhl	21	21
7	(Indonesia) R Widianto (Indonesia) P R Dili	16	12
(China) Lu K (China) Huang YQ	18	21	13
2	(Indonesia) T Ahmad (Indonesia) L Natsir	21	11	21

Quarterfinals
Q1	(Malaysia) Chan P S (Malaysia) Lai P J	15	21	10
4	(South Korea) Ko S-h (South Korea) Kim H-n	21	19	21
(Denmark) M Pieler Kolding (Denmark) K Rytter Juhl	15	9
2	(Indonesia) T Ahmad (Indonesia) L Natsir	21	21

Semifinals
4	(South Korea) Ko S-h (South Korea) Kim H-n	22	21
2	(Indonesia) T Ahmad (Indonesia) L Natsir	20	18

=== Finals ===
Semifinals
1	(China) Zhang Nan (China) Zhao Yunlei	21	6	18
3	(Denmark) Joachim Fischer Nielsen (Denmark) Christinna Pedersen	14	21	21
4	(South Korea) Ko Sung-hyun (South Korea) Kim Ha-na	22	21
2	(Indonesia) Tontowi Ahmad (Indonesia) Lilyana Natsir	20	18

Final
3	(Denmark) Joachim Fischer Nielsen (Denmark) Christinna Pedersen	21	18	21
4	(South Korea) Ko Sung-hyun (South Korea) Kim Ha-na	16	21	18

Preceded by 2013 India Super Series	India Open	Succeeded by 2015 India Super Series
Preceded by 2014 All England Super Series Premier	BWF Super Series; 2014 season	Succeeded by 2014 Singapore Super Series
