= 2015 Sudirman Cup group stage =

This article lists the complete results of the group stage of the 2015 Sudirman Cup in Dongguan, China.

== Group 1A ==
Pos	Team	Pld	W	L	MF	MA	MD	GF	GA	GD	PF	PA	PD	Pts	Qualification
1	China (H)	2	2	0	10	0	+10	20	2	+18	449	307	+142	2	Advance to knockout stages
2	Germany	2	1	1	3	7	−4	6	17	−11	341	443	−102	1	Advance to knockout stages
3	Thailand	2	0	2	2	8	−6	9	16	−7	418	458	−40	0	

Source: BWF
(H) Host

=== China vs Germany ===
China
5
Dongfeng Nissan Sports Center, Court 1
10 May 2015

Germany
0

			1	2	3
1	(China) (Germany)	Xu Chen / Ma Jin; Michael Fuchs / Birgit Michels	21; 16	22; 20
2	(China) (Germany)	Lin Dan; Marc Zwiebler	21; 11	21; 11
3	(China) (Germany)	Chai Biao / Hong Wei; Michael Fuchs / Johannes Schoettler	13; 10			retired
4	(China) (Germany)	Li Xuerui; Karin Schnaase	21; 17	21; 8
5	(China) (Germany)	Tang Yuanting / Yu Yang; Isabel Herttrich / Birgit Michels	21; 14	21; 14

=== Thailand vs Germany ===
Thailand
2
Dongfeng Nissan Sports Center, Court 2
11 May 2015

Germany
3

			1	2	3
1	(Thailand) (Germany)	Bodin Issara / Nipitphon Puangpuapech; Michael Fuchs / Peter Kaesbauer	21; 15	21; 16
2	(Thailand) (Germany)	Ratchanok Intanon; Karin Schnaase	21; 16	21; 4
3	(Thailand) (Germany)	Tanongsak Saensomboonsuk; Marc Zwiebler	18; 21	21; 16	13; 21
4	(Thailand) (Germany)	Puttita Supajirakul / Sapsiree Taerattanachai; Johanna Goliszewski / Carla Nelte	19; 21	21; 16	13; 21
5	(Thailand) (Germany)	Sudket Prapakamol / Kunchala Voravichitchaikul; Michael Fuchs / Birgit Michels	12; 21	21; 11	10; 21

=== China vs Thailand ===
China
5
Dongfeng Nissan Sports Center, Court 1
12 May 2015

Thailand
0

			1	2	3
1	(China) (Thailand)	Cai Yun / Fu Haifeng; Bodin Issara / Pakkawat Vilailak	14; 21	21; 14	21; 19
2	(China) (Thailand)	Wang Yihan; Busanan Ongbumrungpan	21; 16	21; 15
3	(China) (Thailand)	Chen Long; Boonsak Ponsana	21; 14	21; 8
4	(China) (Thailand)	Ma Jin / Tang Yuanting; Duanganong Aroonkesorn / Kunchala Voravichitchaikul	21; 19	21; 10
5	(China) (Thailand)	Liu Cheng / Zhao Yunlei; Nipitphon Puangpuapech / Puttita Supajirakul	14; 21	21; 17	21; 12

== Group 1B ==
Pos	Team	Pld	W	L	MF	MA	MD	GF	GA	GD	PF	PA	PD	Pts	Qualification
1	Japan	2	2	0	8	2	+6	16	7	+9	444	375	+69	2	Advance to knockout stages
2	Chinese Taipei	2	1	1	5	5	0	12	12	0	437	431	+6	1	Advance to knockout stages
3	Russia	2	0	2	2	8	−6	7	16	−9	361	436	−75	0	

Source: BWF

=== Japan vs Russia ===
Japan
4
Dongfeng Nissan Sports Center, Court 2
10 May 2015

Russia
1

			1	2	3
1	(Japan) (Russia)	Hiroyuki Endo / Kenichi Hayakawa; Vladimir Ivanov / Ivan Sozonov	19; 21	12; 21
2	(Japan) (Russia)	Akane Yamaguchi; Natalia Perminova	21; 15	21; 16
3	(Japan) (Russia)	Kento Momota; Vladimir Malkov	21; 15	21; 9
4	(Japan) (Russia)	Misaki Matsutomo / Ayaka Takahashi; Ekaterina Bolotova / Evgeniya Kosetskaya	21; 9	21; 10
5	(Japan) (Russia)	Kenta Kazuno / Ayane Kurihara; Evgenia Dimova / Evgenij Dremin	21; 16	9; 21	21; 13

=== Chinese Taipei vs Russia ===
Chinese Taipei
4
Dongfeng Nissan Sports Center, Court 1
11 May 2015

Russia
1

			1	2	3
1	(Chinese Taipei) (Russia)	Chen Hung-ling / Wu Ti-jung; Vitalij Durkin / Nina Vislova	9; 21	19; 21
2	(Chinese Taipei) (Russia)	Chou Tien-chen; Vladimir Malkov	21; 11	21; 15
3	(Chinese Taipei) (Russia)	Lee Sheng-mu / Tsai Chia-hsin; Vladimir Ivanov / Ivan Sozonov	21; 12	12; 21	21; 17
4	(Chinese Taipei) (Russia)	Tai Tzu-ying; Natalia Perminova	21; 18	21; 5
5	(Chinese Taipei) (Russia)	Hsieh Pei-chen / Wu Ti-jung; Ekaterina Bolotova / Evgeniya Kosetskaya	20; 22	21; 16	21; 16

=== Japan vs Chinese Taipei ===
Japan
4
Dongfeng Nissan Sports Center, Court 2
12 May 2015

Chinese Taipei
1

			1	2	3
1	(Japan) (Chinese Taipei)	Hiroyuki Endo / Kenichi Hayakawa; Lee Sheng-mu / Tsai Chia-hsin	21; 19	21; 17
2	(Japan) (Chinese Taipei)	Nozomi Okuhara; Tai Tzu-ying	24; 26	17; 21
3	(Japan) (Chinese Taipei)	Kento Momota; Chou Tien-chen	21; 14	8; 21	21; 12
4	(Japan) (Chinese Taipei)	Misaki Matsutomo / Ayaka Takahashi; Hsieh Pei-chen / Wu Ti-jung	21; 9	21; 15
5	(Japan) (Chinese Taipei)	Kenta Kazuno / Ayane Kurihara; Tseng Min-hao / Lai Chia-wen	19; 21	21; 18	21; 16

== Group 1C ==
Pos	Team	Pld	W	L	MF	MA	MD	GF	GA	GD	PF	PA	PD	Pts	Qualification
1	Indonesia	2	2	0	6	4	+2	13	9	+4	408	360	+48	2	Advance to knockout stages
2	Denmark	2	1	1	6	4	+2	13	10	+3	428	403	+25	1	Advance to knockout stages
3	England	2	0	2	3	7	−4	7	14	−7	343	416	−73	0	

Source: BWF

=== Denmark vs England ===
Denmark
4
Dongfeng Nissan Sports Center, Court 2
10 May 2015

England
1

			1	2	3
1	(Denmark) (England)	Mads Pieler Kolding / Sara Thygesen; Chris Adcock / Gabrielle Adcock	18; 21	18; 21
2	(Denmark) (England)	Viktor Axelsen; Rajiv Ouseph	21; 12	21; 18
3	(Denmark) (England)	Mads Conrad-Petersen / Mads Pieler Kolding; Chris Adcock / Andrew Ellis	21; 17	21; 17
4	(Denmark) (England)	Line Kjaersfeldt; Fontaine Mica Chapman	21; 14	21; 13
5	(Denmark) (England)	Lena Grebak / Maria Helsbol; Gabrielle Adcock / Heather Olver	21; 17	18; 21	21; 18

=== Indonesia vs England ===
Indonesia
3
Dongfeng Nissan Sports Center, Court 2
11 May 2015

England
2

			1	2	3
1	(Indonesia) (England)	Mohammad Ahsan / Hendra Setiawan; Andrew Ellis / Peter Mills	21; 17	21; 15
2	(Indonesia) (England)	Lindaweni Fanetri; Fontaine Mica Chapman	21; 10	21; 13
3	(Indonesia) (England)	Jonatan Christie; Rajiv Ouseph	17; 21	16; 21
4	(Indonesia) (England)	Nitya Krishinda Maheswari / Greysia Polii; Heather Olver / Lauren Smith	21; 15			retired
5	(Indonesia) (England)	Tontowi Ahmad / Liliyana Natsir; Chris Adcock / Gabrielle Adcock	17; 21	18; 21

=== Denmark vs Indonesia ===
Denmark
2
Dongfeng Nissan Sports Center, Court 1
13 May 2015

Indonesia
3

			1	2	3
1	(Denmark) (Indonesia)	Kim Astrup / Anders Skaarup Rasmussen; Mohammad Ahsan / Hendra Setiawan	23; 21	16; 21	12; 21
2	(Denmark) (Indonesia)	Line Kjaersfeldt; Bellaetrix Manuputty	15; 21	18; 21
3	(Denmark) (Indonesia)	Jan O Jorgensen; Firman Abdul Kholik	21; 8	21; 10
4	(Denmark) (Indonesia)	Maiken Fruergaard / Maria Helsbol; Nitya Krishinda Maheswari / Greysia Polii	16; 21	13; 21
5	(Denmark) (Indonesia)	Mads Pieler Kolding / Sara Thygesen; Praveen Jordan / Debby Susanto	9; 21	21; 17	21; 11

== Group 1D ==
Pos	Team	Pld	W	L	MF	MA	MD	GF	GA	GD	PF	PA	PD	Pts	Qualification
1	Malaysia	2	2	0	6	4	+2	13	9	+4	414	402	+12	2	Advance to knockout stages
2	South Korea	2	1	1	6	4	+2	14	10	+4	456	413	+43	1	Advance to knockout stages
3	India	2	0	2	3	7	−4	8	16	−8	414	469	−55	0	

Source: BWF

=== South Korea vs Malaysia ===
South Korea
2
Dongfeng Nissan Sports Center, Court 1
10 May 2015

Malaysia
3

			1	2	3
1	(South Korea) (Malaysia)	Lee Yong-dae / Yoo Yeon-seong; Goh V Shem / Tan Wee Kiong	22; 20	14; 21	25; 27
2	(South Korea) (Malaysia)	Sung Ji-hyun; Lim Yin Fun	21; 9	21; 7
3	(South Korea) (Malaysia)	Lee Dong-keun; Lee Chong Wei	12; 21	10; 21
4	(South Korea) (Malaysia)	Chang Ye-na / Jung Kyung-eun; Vivian Hoo Kah Mun / Woon Khe Wei	22; 20	21; 9
5	(South Korea) (Malaysia)	Ko Sung-hyun / Kim Ha-na; Chan Peng Soon / Goh Liu Ying	21; 23	13; 21

=== India vs Malaysia ===
India
2
Dongfeng Nissan Sports Center, Court 1
11 May 2015

Malaysia
3

			1	2	3
1	(India) (Malaysia)	Manu Attri / Sumeeth Reddy Buss; Goh V Shem / Tan Wee Kiong	15; 21	16; 21
2	(India) (Malaysia)	Saina Nehwal; Tee Jing Yi	24; 22	21; 13
3	(India) (Malaysia)	Srikanth Kidambi; Lee Chong Wei	16; 21	15; 21
4	(India) (Malaysia)	Jwala Gutta / Ashwini Ponnappa; Vivian Hoo Kah Mun / Woon Khe Wei	21; 18	19; 21	21; 15
5	(India) (Malaysia)	Arun Vishnu / Sikki Reddy Nelakurthi; Chan Peng Soon / Goh Liu Ying	14; 21	18; 21

=== South Korea vs India ===
South Korea
4
Dongfeng Nissan Sports Center, Court 2
13 May 2015

India
1

			1	2	3
1	(South Korea) (India)	Kim Ki-jung / Kim Sa-rang; Pranaav Jerry Chopra / Akshay Dewalkar	21; 10	21; 19
2	(South Korea) (India)	Bae Yeon-ju; Saina Nehwal	20; 22	21; 17	13; 21
3	(South Korea) (India)	Son Wan-ho; Kashyap Parupalli	13; 21	21; 14	21; 13
4	(South Korea) (India)	Chang Ye-na / Jung Kyung-eun; Jwala Gutta / Ashwini Ponnappa	18; 21	21; 12	21; 12
5	(South Korea) (India)	Ko Sung-hyun / Kim Ha-na; Manu Attri / Sikki Reddy Nelakurthi	21; 12	22; 20

== Group 2A ==
Pos	Team	Pld	W	L	MF	MA	MD	GF	GA	GD	PF	PA	PD	Pts	Qualification
1	Netherlands	3	3	0	10	5	+5	22	13	+9	670	598	+72	3	Advance to classification rounds
2	Singapore	3	2	1	7	8	−1	16	16	0	583	580	+3	2	Advance to classification rounds
3	Spain	3	1	2	7	8	−1	16	20	−4	636	657	−21	1	Advance to classification rounds
4	Canada	3	0	3	6	9	−3	16	21	−5	636	690	−54	0	Advance to classification rounds

Source: BWF

=== Singapore vs Spain ===
Singapore
3
Dongfeng Nissan Sports Center, Court 3
10 May 2015

Spain
2

			1	2	3
1	(Singapore) (Spain)	Derek Wong; Pablo Abián	18; 21	11; 21
2	(Singapore) (Spain)	Yeo Jia Min; Carolina Marín	9; 21	17; 21
3	(Singapore) (Spain)	Terry Hee / Hendra Wijaya; Pablo Abián / Luís Enrique Peñalver	21; 15	21; 11
4	(Singapore) (Spain)	Elaine Chua / Jessica Tan; Clara Azurmendi / Carolina Marín	21; 15	25; 23
5	(Singapore) (Spain)	Shinta Mulia Sari / Chayut Triyachart; Ernesto Velázquez / Beatriz Corrales	21; 12	21; 18

=== Netherlands vs Canada ===
Netherlands
3
Dongfeng Nissan Sports Center, Court 4
10 May 2015

Canada
2

			1	2	3
1	(Netherlands) (Canada)	Jorrit de Ruiter / Samantha Barning; Toby Ng / Alex Bruce	11; 21	21; 16	17; 21
2	(Netherlands) (Canada)	Mark Caljouw; Andrew D'Souza	24; 22	15; 21	21; 8
3	(Netherlands) (Canada)	Jacco Arends / Jelle Maas; Adrian Liu / Derrick Ng	21; 18	21; 19
4	(Netherlands) (Canada)	Soraya de Visch Eijbergen; Michelle Li	14; 21	14; 21
5	(Netherlands) (Canada)	Eefje Muskens / Selena Piek; Alex Bruce / Phyllis Chan	21; 9	21; 12

=== Singapore vs Canada ===
Singapore
3
Dongfeng Nissan Sports Center, Court 5
11 May 2015

Canada
2

			1	2	3
1	(Singapore) (Canada)	Terry Hee / Jessica Tan; Alex Bruce / Toby Ng	21; 15	21; 16
2	(Singapore) (Canada)	Derek Wong; Andrew D'Souza	21; 12	21; 19
3	(Singapore) (Canada)	Danny Bawa Chrisnanta / Chayut Triyachart; Adrian Liu / Derrick Ng	18; 21	21; 10	18; 21
4	(Singapore) (Canada)	Yeo Jia Min; Carolina Marín	9; 21	17; 21
5	(Singapore) (Canada)	Elaine Chua / Jessica Tan; Clara Azurmendi / Carolina Marín	21; 15	25; 23

=== Netherlands vs Spain ===
Netherlands
3
Dongfeng Nissan Sports Center, Court 2
12 May 2015

Spain
2

			1	2	3
1	(Netherlands) (Spain)	Jacco Arends / Selena Piek; Pablo Abián / Carolina Marín	21; 11	17; 21	21; 14
2	(Netherlands) (Spain)	Mark Caljouw; Ernesto Velázquez	12; 21	23; 21	19; 21
3	(Netherlands) (Spain)	Soraya de Visch Eijbergen; Beatriz Corrales	11; 21	17; 21
4	(Netherlands) (Spain)	Jacco Arends / Jelle Maas; Luís Enrique Peñalver / Ernesto Velázquez	21; 10	21; 13
5	(Netherlands) (Spain)	Eefje Muskens / Selena Piek; Clara Azurmendi / Carolina Marín	21; 8	21; 16

=== Canada vs Spain ===
Canada
2
Dongfeng Nissan Sports Center, Court 4
13 May 2015

Spain
3

			1	2	3
1	(Canada) (Spain)	Alex Bruce / Toby Ng; Beatriz Corrales / Ernesto Velázquez	19; 21	21; 10	12; 21
2	(Canada) (Spain)	Andrew D'Souza; Pablo Abián	21; 16	12; 21	8; 21
3	(Canada) (Spain)	Michelle Li; Carolina Marín	12; 21	27; 25	24; 22
4	(Canada) (Spain)	Adrian Liu / Derrick Ng; Luís Enrique Peñalver / Ernesto Velázquez	21; 9	21; 16
5	(Canada) (Spain)	Alex Bruce / Phyllis Chan; Beatriz Corrales / Carolina Marín	21; 17	17; 21	13; 21

=== Singapore vs Netherlands ===
Singapore
1
Dongfeng Nissan Sports Center, Court 1
13 May 2015

Netherlands
4

			1	2	3
1	(Singapore) (Netherlands)	Terry Hee / Hendra Wijaya; Jacco Arends / Jelle Maas	11; 21	17; 21
2	(Singapore) (Netherlands)	Chen Jiayuan; Soraya de Visch Eijbergen	21; 17	23; 25	12; 21
3	(Singapore) (Netherlands)	Derek Wong; Mark Caljouw	21; 12	25; 23
4	(Singapore) (Netherlands)	Elaine Chua / Shinta Mulia Sari; Eefje Muskens / Selena Piek	21; 21	21; 21
5	(Singapore) (Netherlands)	Danny Bawa Chrisnanta / Vanessa Neo; Jorrit de Ruiter / Samantha Barning	15; 21	19; 21

== Group 2B ==
Pos	Team	Pld	W	L	MF	MA	MD	GF	GA	GD	PF	PA	PD	Pts	Qualification
1	Hong Kong	3	3	0	15	0	+15	30	4	+26	695	508	+187	3	Advance to classification rounds
2	France	3	2	1	7	8	−1	17	19	−2	645	648	−3	2	Advance to classification rounds
3	United States	3	1	2	6	9	−3	15	19	−4	616	621	−5	1	Advance to classification rounds
4	Brazil	3	0	3	2	13	−11	7	27	−20	498	677	−179	0	Advance to classification rounds

Source: BWF

=== Hong Kong vs Brazil ===
Hong Kong
5
Dongfeng Nissan Sports Center, Court 3
10 May 2015

Brazil
0

			1	2	3
1	(Hong Kong) (Brazil)	Or Chin Chung / Tang Chun Man; Hugo Arthuso / Daniel Paiola	21; 9	21; 7
2	(Hong Kong) (Brazil)	Cheung Ying Mei; Fabiana Silva	21; 17	21; 14
3	(Hong Kong) (Brazil)	Hu Yun; Alex Yuwan Tjong	8; 21	21; 17	21; 17
4	(Hong Kong) (Brazil)	Chan Tsz Ka / Yuen Sin Ying; Paula Pereira / Fabiana Silva	21; 8	21; 8
5	(Hong Kong) (Brazil)	Chan Yun Lung / Tse Ying Suet; Ygor Coelho / Lohaynny Vicente	21; 12	21; 8

=== United States vs France ===
United States
2
Dongfeng Nissan Sports Center, Court 4
10 May 2015

France
3

			1	2	3
1	(United States) (France)	Phillip Chew / Jamie Subandhi; Ronan Labar / Émilie Lefel	15; 21	21; 18	17; 21
2	(United States) (France)	Bjorn Seguin; Brice Leverdez	17; 21	16; 21
3	(United States) (France)	Rong Schafer; Delphine Lansac	21; 15	16; 21	21; 8
4	(United States) (France)	Phillip Chew / Sattawat Pongnairat; Baptiste Carême / Ronan Labar	11; 21	15; 21
5	(United States) (France)	Eva Lee / Paula Lynn Obañana; Delphine Lansac / Émilie Lefel	21; 13	21; 19

=== United States vs Brazil ===
United States
4
Dongfeng Nissan Sports Center, Court 4
12 May 2015

Brazil
1

			1	2	3
1	(United States) (Brazil)	Phillip Chew / Jamie Subandhi; Alex Yuwan Tjong / Lohaynny Vicente	21; 15	26; 24
2	(United States) (Brazil)	Howard Shu; Ygor Coelho	14; 21	21; 15	18; 21
3	(United States) (Brazil)	Phillip Chew / Sattawat Pongnairat; Hugo Arthuso / Daniel Paiola	21; 17	21; 10
4	(United States) (Brazil)	Iris Wang; Fabiana Silva	21; 11	21; 5
5	(United States) (Brazil)	Eva Lee / Paula Lynn Obañana; Lohaynny Vicente / Luana Vicente	21; 14	21; 17

=== Hong Kong vs France ===
Hong Kong
5
Dongfeng Nissan Sports Center, Court 1
12 May 2015

France
0

			1	2	3
1	(Hong Kong) (France)	Lee Chun Hei / Chau Hoi Wah; Ronan Labar / Émilie Lefel	21; 12	15; 21	23; 21
2	(Hong Kong) (France)	Wei Nan; Brice Leverdez	21; 17	21; 15
3	(Hong Kong) (France)	Or Chin Chung / Tang Chun Man; Baptiste Carême / Ronan Labar	21; 17	21; 16
4	(Hong Kong) (France)	Cheung Ngan Yi; Anne Tran	21; 14	21; 15
5	(Hong Kong) (France)	Poon Lok Yan / Tse Ying Suet; Audrey Fontaine / Émilie Lefel	19; 21	21; 10	21; 13

=== France vs Brazil ===
France
4
Dongfeng Nissan Sports Center, Court 5
13 May 2015

Brazil
1

			1	2	3
1	(France) (Brazil)	Brice Leverdez; Daniel Paiola	12; 21	21; 8	21; 16
2	(France) (Brazil)	Delphine Lansac; Lohaynny Vicente	17; 21	16; 21
3	(France) (Brazil)	Baptiste Carême / Ronan Labar; Ygor Coelho / Alex Yuwan Tjong	21; 9	19; 21	21; 15
4	(France) (Brazil)	Émilie Lefel / Anne Tran; Lohaynny Vicente / Luana Vicente	21; 15	22; 20
5	(France) (Brazil)	Gaëtan Mittelheisser / Audrey Fontaine; Paula Pereira / Alex Yuwan Tjong	21; 16	26; 7

=== Hong Kong vs United States ===
Hong Kong
5
Dongfeng Nissan Sports Center, Court 2
13 May 2015

United States
0

			1	2	3
1	(Hong Kong) (United States)	Chan Yun Lung / Tse Ying Suet; Howard Shu / Eva Lee	22; 20	21; 9
2	(Hong Kong) (United States)	Wong Wing Ki; Sattawat Pongnairat	21; 11	21; 9
3	(Hong Kong) (United States)	Yip Pui Yin; Jamie Subandhi	23; 21	21; 14
4	(Hong Kong) (United States)	Or Chin Chung / Tang Chun Man; Phillip Chew / Sattawat Pongnairat	21; 14	21; 19
5	(Hong Kong) (United States)	Chan Tsz Ka / Yuen Sin Ying; Eva Lee / Paula Lynn Obañana	23; 21	16; 21	21; 19

== Group 3A ==
Pos	Team	Pld	W	L	MF	MA	MD	GF	GA	GD	PF	PA	PD	Pts	Qualification
1	Czech Republic	3	3	0	10	5	+5	21	13	+8	670	644	+26	3	Advance to classification rounds
2	Austria	3	2	1	8	7	+1	19	16	+3	653	604	+49	2	Advance to classification rounds
3	Turkey	3	1	2	7	8	−1	17	17	0	627	586	+41	1	Advance to classification rounds
4	South Africa	3	0	3	5	10	−5	12	23	−11	569	685	−116	0	Advance to classification rounds

Source: BWF

=== Czech Republic vs Austria ===
Czech Republic
4
Dongfeng Nissan Sports Center, Court 3
11 May 2015

Austria
1

			1	2	3
1	(Czech Republic) (Austria)	Petr Koukal; Matthias Almer	21; 18	21; 17
2	(Czech Republic) (Austria)	Zuzana Pavelková; Elisabeth Baldauf	18; 21	17; 21
3	(Czech Republic) (Austria)	Jan Fröhlich / Milan Ludík; Dominik Stipsits / Roman Zirnwald	21; 19	21; 18
4	(Czech Republic) (Austria)	Alžběta Bášová / Zuzana Pavelková; Janine Lais / Nathalie Ziesig	21; 19	21; 12
5	(Czech Republic) (Austria)	Jakub Bitman / Alžběta Bášová; Roman Zirnwald / Elisabeth Baldauf	21; 19	15; 21	21; 19

=== Turkey vs South Africa ===
Turkey
3
Dongfeng Nissan Sports Center, Court 3
11 May 2015

South Africa
2

			1	2	3
1	(Turkey) (South Africa)	Emre Vural / Sinan Zorlu; Andries Malan / Willem Viljoen	19; 21	15; 21
2	(Turkey) (South Africa)	Özge Bayrak / Neslihan Yiğit; Jennifer Fry / Sandra le Grange	21; 9	21; 6
3	(Turkey) (South Africa)	Ramazan Öztürk; Jacob Maliekal	15; 21	21; 18	18; 21
4	(Turkey) (South Africa)	Ebru Tunalı; Elme de Villiers	21; 6	21; 14
5	(Turkey) (South Africa)	Ramazan Öztürk / Özge Bayrak; Willem Viljoen / Michelle Butler-Emmett	21; 3	21; 16

=== Czech Republic vs South Africa ===
Czech Republic
3
Dongfeng Nissan Sports Center, Court 3
12 May 2015

South Africa
2

			1	2	3
1	(Czech Republic) (South Africa)	Jakub Bitman / Alžběta Bášová; Willem Viljoen / Michelle Butler-Emmett	21; 17	21; 19
2	(Czech Republic) (South Africa)	Jan Fröhlich; Jacob Maliekal	20; 22	13; 21
3	(Czech Republic) (South Africa)	Zuzana Pavelková; Elme de Villiers	21; 19	21; 17
4	(Czech Republic) (South Africa)	Jakub Bitman / Milan Ludík; Andries Malan / Willem Viljoen	16; 21	21; 8	24; 26
5	(Czech Republic) (South Africa)	Alžběta Bášová / Zuzana Pavelková; Jennifer Fry / Sandra le Grange	21; 13	21; 11

=== Turkey vs Austria ===
Turkey
2
Dongfeng Nissan Sports Center, Court 4
12 May 2015

Austria
3

			1	2	3
1	(Turkey) (Austria)	Ramazan Öztürk; David Obernosterer	4; 21	18; 21
2	(Turkey) (Austria)	Neslihan Yiğit; Elisabeth Baldauf	21; 13	21; 21
3	(Turkey) (Austria)	Emre Vural / Sinan Zorlu; Matthias Almer / Roman Zirnwald	11; 21	9; 21
4	(Turkey) (Austria)	Özge Bayrak / Neslihan Yiğit; Janine Lais / Nathalie Ziesig	21; 8	21; 18
5	(Turkey) (Austria)	Ramazan Öztürk / Özge Bayrak; Matthias Almer / Elisabeth Baldauf	19; 21	11; 21

=== Czech Republic vs Turkey ===
Czech Republic
3
Dongfeng Nissan Sports Center, Court 3
13 May 2015

Turkey
2

			1	2	3
1	(Czech Republic) (Turkey)	Zuzana Pavelková; Neslihan Yiğit	14; 21	15; 21
2	(Czech Republic) (Turkey)	Milan Ludík; Ramazan Öztürk	26; 24	19; 21	21; 13
3	(Czech Republic) (Turkey)	Alžběta Bášová / Zuzana Pavelková; Özge Bayrak / Neslihan Yiğit	8; 21	22; 24
4	(Czech Republic) (Turkey)	Jan Fröhlich / Milan Ludík; Emre Vural / Sinan Zorlu	14; 21	21; 18	21; 15
5	(Czech Republic) (Turkey)	Jakub Bitman / Alžběta Bášová; Ramazan Öztürk / Özge Bayrak	25; 23	26; 24

=== South Africa vs Austria ===
South Africa
1
Dongfeng Nissan Sports Center, Court 5
13 May 2015

Austria
4

			1	2	3
1	(South Africa) (Austria)	Andries Malan / Willem Viljoen; Matthias Almer / David Obernosterer	17; 21	16; 21
2	(South Africa) (Austria)	Elme de Villiers; Elisabeth Baldauf	21; 18	12; 21	10; 21
3	(South Africa) (Austria)	Jacob Maliekal; Luka Wraber	22; 20	9; 21	15; 21
4	(South Africa) (Austria)	Michelle Butler-Emmett / Elme de Villiers; Janine Lais / Nathalie Ziesig	19; 21	21; 5	21; 19
5	(South Africa) (Austria)	Andries Malan / Jennifer Fry; Matthias Almer / Elisabeth Baldauf	19; 21	17; 21

== Group 3B ==
Pos	Team	Pld	W	L	MF	MA	MD	GF	GA	GD	PF	PA	PD	Pts	Qualification
1	Vietnam	3	3	0	12	3	+9	24	9	+15	653	474	+179	3	Advance to classification rounds
2	Australia	3	2	1	9	6	+3	20	14	+6	601	593	+8	2	Advance to classification rounds
3	Switzerland	3	1	2	6	9	−3	15	19	−4	605	611	−6	1	Advance to classification rounds
4	Italy	3	0	3	3	12	−9	7	24	−17	444	625	−181	0	Advance to classification rounds

Source: BWF

=== Vietnam vs Switzerland ===
Vietnam
4
Dongfeng Nissan Sports Center, Court 3
11 May 2015

Switzerland
1

			1	2	3
1	(Vietnam) (Switzerland)	Đào Mạnh Thắng / Lê Hà Anh; Anthony Dumartheray / Oliver Schaller	21; 13	21; 15
2	(Vietnam) (Switzerland)	Vũ Thị Trang; Sabrina Jaquet	15; 21	12; 21
3	(Vietnam) (Switzerland)	Nguyễn Tiến Minh; Christian Kirchmayr	21; 9	21; 8
4	(Vietnam) (Switzerland)	Nguyễn Thị Sen / Phạm Như Thảo; Cendrine Hantz / Sabrina Jaquet	18; 21	21; 15	23; 21
5	(Vietnam) (Switzerland)	Dương Bảo Đức / Thái Thị Hồng Gấm; Oliver Schaller / Céline Burkart	19; 21	21; 16	21; 17

=== Australia vs Italy ===
Australia
4
Dongfeng Nissan Sports Center, Court 4
11 May 2015

Italy
1

			1	2	3
1	(Australia) (Italy)	Robin Middleton / Leanne Choo; Giovanni Greco / Karin Maran	21; 13	21; 5
2	(Australia) (Italy)	Daniel Guda; Rosario Maddaloni	21; 17	21; 17
3	(Australia) (Italy)	Joy Lai; Jeanine Cicognini	19; 21	13; 21
4	(Australia) (Italy)	Matthew Chau / Sawan Serasinghe; Giovanni Greco / Rosario Maddaloni	21; 19	21; 19
5	(Australia) (Italy)	Leanne Choo / Gronya Somerville; Jeanine Cicognini / Karin Maran	21; 11	13; 21	21; 15

=== Vietnam vs Italy ===
Vietnam
5
Dongfeng Nissan Sports Center, Court 3
13 May 2015

Italy
0

			1	2	3
1	(Vietnam) (Italy)	Phạm Cao Cường; Matteo Bellucci	21; 14	21; 12
2	(Vietnam) (Italy)	Vũ Thị Trang; Ramona Gloria Pirvanescu	21; 5	21; 3
3	(Vietnam) (Italy)	Đào Mạnh Thắng / Lê Hà Anh; Matteo Bellucci / Giovanni Greco	21; 13	21; 10
4	(Vietnam) (Italy)	Nguyễn Thị Sen / Phạm Như Thảo; Lisa Iversen / Ramona Gloria Pirvanescu	21; 8	21; 11
5	(Vietnam) (Italy)	Dương Bảo Đức / Thái Thị Hồng Gấm; Rosario Maddaloni / Karin Maran	21; 17	21; 12

=== Australia vs Switzerland ===
Australia
3
Dongfeng Nissan Sports Center, Court 4
13 May 2015

Switzerland
2

			1	2	3
1	(Australia) (Switzerland)	Robin Middleton / Leanne Choo; Oliver Schaller / Céline Burkart	21; 13	21; 9
2	(Australia) (Switzerland)	Daniel Guda; Christian Kirchmayr	17; 21	21; 14	11; 21
3	(Australia) (Switzerland)	Joy Lai; Sabrina Jaquet	14; 21	16; 21
4	(Australia) (Switzerland)	Matthew Chau / Sawan Serasinghe; Anthony Dumartheray / Oliver Schaller	21; 17	21; 13
5	(Australia) (Switzerland)	Leanne Choo / Gronya Somerville; Cendrine Hantz / Sabrina Jaquet	12; 21	21; 16	21; 18

=== Vietnam vs Australia ===
Vietnam
3
Dongfeng Nissan Sports Center, Court 1
14 May 2015

Australia
2

			1	2	3
1	(Vietnam) (Australia)	Dương Bảo Đức / Thái Thị Hồng Gấm; Robin Middleton / Leanne Choo	14; 21	16; 21
2	(Vietnam) (Australia)	Nguyễn Tiến Minh; Daniel Guda	21; 9	21; 10
3	(Vietnam) (Australia)	Vũ Thị Trang; Joy Lai	21; 12	21; 7
4	(Vietnam) (Australia)	Đào Mạnh Thắng / Lê Hà Anh; Matthew Chau / Sawan Serasinghe	21; 16	17; 21	21; 12
5	(Vietnam) (Australia)	Nguyễn Thị Sen / Vũ Thị Trang; Leanne Choo / Gronya Somerville	18; 21	18; 21

=== Italy vs Switzerland ===
Italy
2
Dongfeng Nissan Sports Center, Court 2
14 May 2015

Switzerland
3

			1	2	3
1	(Italy) (Switzerland)	Rosario Maddaloni / Karin Maran; Oliver Schaller / Céline Burkart	15; 21	13; 21
2	(Italy) (Switzerland)	Giovanni Greco; Christian Kirchmayr	21; 18	21; 17
3	(Italy) (Switzerland)	Jeanine Cicognini; Sabrina Jaquet	9; 21	4; 21
4	(Italy) (Switzerland)	Giovanni Greco / Rosario Maddaloni; Anthony Dumartheray / Oliver Schaller	21; 16	27; 25
5	(Italy) (Switzerland)	Jeanine Cicognini / Karin Maran; Cendrine Hantz / Sabrina Jaquet	14; 21	15; 21

== Group 4A ==
Pos	Team	Pld	W	L	MF	MA	MD	GF	GA	GD	PF	PA	PD	Pts	Qualification
1	Philippines	2	2	0	9	1	+8	18	4	+14	445	315	+130	2	Advance to classification rounds
2	Iceland	2	1	1	4	6	−2	9	12	−3	363	383	−20	1	Advance to classification rounds
3	Nigeria	2	0	2	2	8	−6	6	17	−11	351	461	−110	0	Advance to classification rounds

Source: BWF

=== Nigeria vs Iceland ===
Nigeria
2
Dongfeng Nissan Sports Center, Court 5
11 May 2015

Iceland
3

			1	2	3
1	(Nigeria) (Iceland)	Victor Makanju / Dorcas Ajoke Adesokan; Daniel Thomsen / Rakel Jóhannesdóttir	11; 21	20; 22
2	(Nigeria) (Iceland)	Enejoh Abah; Kári Gunnarsson	21; 16	10; 21	21; 15
3	(Nigeria) (Iceland)	Grace Gabriel; Margrét Jóhannsdóttir	21; 19	21; 17
4	(Nigeria) (Iceland)	Enejoh Abah / Victor Makanju; Kári Gunnarsson / Atli Jóhannesson	21; 23	7; 21
5	(Nigeria) (Iceland)	Dorcas Ajoke Adesokan / Grace Gabriel; Rakel Jóhannesdóttir / Margrét Jóhannsdóttir	13; 21	16; 21

=== Philippines vs Iceland ===
Philippines
4
Dongfeng Nissan Sports Center, Court 5
12 May 2015

Iceland
1

			1	2	3
1	(Philippines) (Iceland)	Ronel Estanislao / Thea Marie Pomar; Daniel Thomsen / Rakel Jóhannesdóttir	21; 14	21; 11
2	(Philippines) (Iceland)	Ros Leonard Pedrosa; Kári Gunnarsson	15; 21	18; 21
3	(Philippines) (Iceland)	Airah Albo; Margrét Jóhannsdóttir	21; 13	21; 11
4	(Philippines) (Iceland)	Peter Gabriel Magnaye / Paul Vivas; Kári Gunnarsson / Atli Jóhannesson	21; 16	21; 18
5	(Philippines) (Iceland)	Eleanor Inlayo / Alyssa Leonardo; Rakel Jóhannesdóttir / Margrét Jóhannsdóttir	21; 10	21; 11

=== Nigeria vs Philippines ===
Nigeria
0
Dongfeng Nissan Sports Center, Court 3
14 May 2015

Philippines
5

			1	2	3
1	(Nigeria) (Philippines)	Victor Makanju / Dorcas Ajoke Adesokan; Paul Jefferson Vivas / Eleanor Inlayo	5; 21	13; 21
2	(Nigeria) (Philippines)	Enejoh Abah; Frell Keeyann Gabuelo	21; 16	15; 21	18; 21
3	(Nigeria) (Philippines)	Grace Gabriel; Sarah Barredo	21; 18	12; 21	14; 21
4	(Nigeria) (Philippines)	Enejoh Abah / Victor Makanju; Philip Joper Escueta / Ronel Estanislao	9; 21	13; 21
5	(Nigeria) (Philippines)	Dorcas Ajoke Adesokan / Grace Gabriel; Patricia Barredo / Thea Pomar	14; 21	14; 21

== Group 4B ==
Pos	Team	Pld	W	L	MF	MA	MD	GF	GA	GD	PF	PA	PD	Pts	Qualification
1	Sri Lanka	3	3	0	10	5	+5	22	12	+10	640	572	+68	3	Advance to classification rounds
2	Israel	3	2	1	9	6	+3	18	12	+6	547	482	+65	2	Advance to classification rounds
3	Kazakhstan	3	1	2	8	7	+1	17	17	0	638	620	+18	1	Advance to classification rounds
4	Seychelles	3	0	3	3	12	−9	9	25	−16	519	670	−151	0	Advance to classification rounds

Source: BWF

=== Israel vs Kazakhstan ===
Israel
3
Dongfeng Nissan Sports Center, Court 5
10 May 2015

Kazakhstan
2

			1	2	3
1	(Israel) (Kazakhstan)	Ariel Shainski / Alina Pugach; Arman Murzabekov / Ilyana Filipchuk	21; 19	21; 19
2	(Israel) (Kazakhstan)	Misha Zilberman; Artur Niyazov	21; 11	21; 12
3	(Israel) (Kazakhstan)	Dana Kugel; Veronika Sorokina	25; 27	10; 21
4	(Israel) (Kazakhstan)	Ariel Shainski / Misha Zilberman; Khaitmurat Kulmatov / Artur Niyazov	21; 18	21; 18
5	(Israel) (Kazakhstan)	Dana Kugel / Alina Pugach; Ilyana Filipchuk / Veronika Sorokina	15; 21	15; 21

=== Sri Lanka vs Seychelles ===
Sri Lanka
4
Dongfeng Nissan Sports Center, Court 5
10 May 2015

Seychelles
1

			1	2	3
1	(Sri Lanka) (Seychelles)	Nimmika Thisara / Achini Ratnasiri; Georgie Cupidon / Allisen Camille	21; 16	24; 22
2	(Sri Lanka) (Seychelles)	Mestiyage Gunatilleke; Kervin Ghislain	17; 21	21; 15	21; 16
3	(Sri Lanka) (Seychelles)	Lekha Shehani; Danielle Jupiter	21; 8	21; 2
4	(Sri Lanka) (Seychelles)	Mestiyage Gunatilleke / Nimmika Thisara; Georgie Cupidon / Steve Malcouzanne	21; 18	16; 21	14; 21
5	(Sri Lanka) (Seychelles)	Thilini Jayasinghe / Achini Ratnasiri; Juliette Ah-Wan / Allisen Camille	21; 18	21; 18

=== Israel vs Seychelles ===
Israel
4
Dongfeng Nissan Sports Center, Court 3
12 May 2015

Seychelles
1

			1	2	3
1	(Israel) (Seychelles)	Ariel Shainski / Alina Pugach; Steve Malcouzanne / Juliette Ah-Wan	21; 14	21; 12
2	(Israel) (Seychelles)	Misha Zilberman; Kervin Ghislain	21; 4	21; 4
3	(Israel) (Seychelles)	Dana Kugel; Allisen Camille	21; 12	21; 13
4	(Israel) (Seychelles)	Ariel Shainski / Misha Zilberman; Georgie Cupidon / Steve Malcouzanne	21; 11	21; 10
5	(Israel) (Seychelles)	Dana Kugel / Alina Pugach; Juliette Ah-Wan / Allisen Camille	10; 21	18; 21

=== Sri Lanka vs Kazakhstan ===
Sri Lanka
3
Dongfeng Nissan Sports Center, Court 5
12 May 2015

Kazakhstan
2

			1	2	3
1	(Sri Lanka) (Kazakhstan)	Nimmika Thisara / Achini Ratnasiri; Ilyana Filipchuk / Arman Murzabekov	21; 12	21; 14
2	(Sri Lanka) (Kazakhstan)	Mestiyage Gunatilleke; Artur Niyazov	17; 21	19; 21
3	(Sri Lanka) (Kazakhstan)	Lekha Shehani; Veronika Sorokina	26; 24	12; 21	15; 21
4	(Sri Lanka) (Kazakhstan)	Mestiyage Gunatilleke / Nimmika Thisara; Khaitmurat Kulmatov / Artur Niyazov	13; 21	21; 18	21; 13
5	(Sri Lanka) (Kazakhstan)	Achini Ratnasiri / Lekha Shehani; Ilyana Filipchuk / Veronika Sorokina	21; 14	21; 16

=== Seychelles vs Kazakhstan ===
Seychelles
1
Dongfeng Nissan Sports Center, Court 4
14 May 2015

Kazakhstan
4

			1	2	3
1	(Seychelles) (Kazakhstan)	Georgie Cupidon / Allisen Camille; Artur Niyazov / Veronika Sorokina	15; 21	11; 21
2	(Seychelles) (Kazakhstan)	Steve Malcouzanne; Arman Murzabekov	21; 12	13; 21	12; 21
3	(Seychelles) (Kazakhstan)	Juliette Ah-Wan; Ilyana Filipchuk	13; 21	22; 24
4	(Seychelles) (Kazakhstan)	Georgie Cupidon / Steve Malcouzanne; Khaitmurat Kulmatov / Artur Niyazov	16; 21	21; 18	12; 21
5	(Seychelles) (Kazakhstan)	Juliette Ah-Wan / Allisen Camille; Ilyana Filipchuk / Veronika Sorokina	24; 22	21; 12

=== Israel vs Sri Lanka ===
Israel
2
Dongfeng Nissan Sports Center, Court 4
14 May 2015

Sri Lanka
3

			1	2	3
1	(Israel) (Sri Lanka)	Ariel Shainski / Alina Pugach; Nimmika Thisara / Achini Ratnasiri	15; 21	13; 21
2	(Israel) (Sri Lanka)	Misha Zilberman; Roshan Padmakumara	21; 9	21; 15
3	(Israel) (Sri Lanka)	Dana Kugel; Lekha Shehani	18; 21	16; 21
4	(Israel) (Sri Lanka)	Ariel Shainski / Misha Zilberman; Mestiyage Gunatilleke / Nimmika Thisara	21; 8	21; 15
5	(Israel) (Sri Lanka)	Dana Kugel / Alina Pugach; Achini Ratnasiri / Lekha Shehani	9; 21	5; 21
