= List of badminton players at the 2016 Summer Olympics =

This is the list of the Badminton players who participated at the 2016 Summer Olympics in Rio de Janeiro, Brazil from 11–20 August 2016.

NOC	Name	Birth date	Event and World Ranking (21 July 2016)				
NOC	Name	Birth date	MS	WS	MD	WD	XD
Australia	Matthew Chau	9 November 1994 (aged 21)			36		
Australia	Robin Middleton	8 February 1985 (aged 31)					28
Australia	Sawan Serasinghe	21 February 1994 (aged 22)			36		
Australia	Chen Hsuan-yu	1 June 1993 (aged 23)		72			
Australia	Leanne Choo	5 June 1991 (aged 25)					28
Austria	David Obernosterer	30 May 1989 (aged 27)	69				
Austria	Elisabeth Baldauf	3 August 1990 (aged 26)		75			
Belgium	Yuhan Tan	21 April 1987 (aged 29)	51				
Belgium	Lianne Tan	20 November 1990 (aged 25)		62			
Brazil	Ygor Coelho	24 November 1996 (aged 19)	64				
Brazil	Lohaynny Vicente	2 May 1996 (aged 20)		66			
Brunei	Jaspar Yu Woon Chai	14 November 1988 (aged 27)	413				
Bulgaria	Gabriela Stoeva	15 July 1994 (aged 22)				16	
Bulgaria	Stefani Stoeva	23 September 1995 (aged 20)				16	
Bulgaria	Linda Zetchiri	27 July 1987 (aged 29)		31			
Canada	Martin Giuffre	5 October 1990 (aged 25)	76				
Canada	Michelle Li	3 November 1991 (aged 24)		19			
China	Chai Biao	10 October 1990 (aged 25)			5		
China	Chen Long	18 January 1989 (aged 27)	2				
China	Fu Haifeng	2 January 1984 (aged 32)			4		
China	Hong Wei	4 October 1989 (aged 26)			5		
China	Lin Dan	14 October 1983 (aged 32)	3				
China	Xu Chen	29 November 1984 (aged 31)					6
China	Zhang Nan	1 March 1990 (aged 26)			4		1
China	Li Xuerui	24 January 1991 (aged 25)		3			
China	Luo Ying	11 January 1991 (aged 25)				7	
China	Luo Yu	11 January 1991 (aged 25)				7	
China	Ma Jin	7 May 1988 (aged 28)					6
China	Tang Yuanting	2 August 1994 (aged 22)				2	
China	Wang Yihan	18 January 1988 (aged 28)		2			
China	Yu Yang	7 April 1986 (aged 30)				2	
China	Zhao Yunlei	25 August 1986 (aged 29)					1
Chinese Taipei	Chou Tien-chen	8 January 1990 (aged 26)	7				
Chinese Taipei	Lee Sheng-mu	3 October 1986 (aged 29)			20		
Chinese Taipei	Tsai Chia-hsin	25 July 1982 (aged 34)			20		
Chinese Taipei	Tai Tzu-ying	20 June 1994 (aged 22)		8			
Cuba	Osleni Guerrero	18 October 1989 (aged 26)	60				
Czech Republic	Petr Koukal	14 December 1985 (aged 30)	83				
Czech Republic	Kristína Gavnholt	12 September 1988 (aged 27)		36			
Denmark	Viktor Axelsen	4 June 1994 (aged 22)	4				
Denmark	Mathias Boe	11 July 1980 (aged 36)			6		
Denmark	Joachim Fischer Nielsen	23 November 1978 (aged 37)					4
Denmark	Jan Ø. Jørgensen	31 December 1987 (aged 28)	5				
Denmark	Carsten Mogensen	24 July 1983 (aged 33)			6		
Denmark	Line Kjærsfeldt	20 April 1994 (aged 22)		24			
Denmark	Christinna Pedersen	12 May 1986 (aged 30)				6	4
Denmark	Kamilla Rytter Juhl	23 November 1983 (aged 32)				6	
Estonia	Raul Must	9 November 1987 (aged 28)	40				
Estonia	Kati Tolmoff	3 December 1983 (aged 32)		71			
Finland	Nanna Vainio	29 May 1991 (aged 25)		63			
France	Brice Leverdez	9 April 1986 (aged 30)	39				
France	Delphine Lansac	18 July 1995 (aged 21)		51			
Great Britain	Chris Adcock	27 April 1989 (aged 27)					7
Great Britain	Marcus Ellis	14 September 1989 (aged 26)			22		
Great Britain	Chris Langridge	2 May 1985 (aged 31)			22		
Great Britain	Rajiv Ouseph	30 August 1986 (aged 29)	15				
Great Britain	Gabby Adcock	30 September 1990 (aged 25)					7
Great Britain	Kirsty Gilmour	21 September 1993 (aged 22)		15			
Great Britain	Heather Olver	15 March 1986 (aged 30)				25	
Great Britain	Lauren Smith	26 September 1991 (aged 24)				25	
Germany	Michael Fuchs	22 April 1982 (aged 34)			27		18
Germany	Johannes Schöttler	27 August 1984 (aged 31)			27		
Germany	Marc Zwiebler	13 March 1984 (aged 32)	14				
Germany	Johanna Goliszewski	9 May 1986 (aged 30)				24	
Germany	Birgit Michels	28 September 1984 (aged 31)					18
Germany	Carla Nelte	21 September 1990 (aged 25)				24	
Germany	Karin Schnaase	14 February 1985 (aged 31)		28			
Guatemala	Kevin Cordón	28 November 1986 (aged 29)		44			
Hong Kong	Hu Yun	31 August 1981 (aged 34)	12				
Hong Kong	Lee Chun Hei	25 January 1994 (aged 22)					16
Hong Kong	Ng Ka Long	24 June 1994 (aged 22)	13				
Hong Kong	Chau Hoi Wah	5 June 1986 (aged 30)					16
Hong Kong	Poon Lok Yan	22 August 1991 (aged 24)				31	
Hong Kong	Tse Ying Suet	9 November 1991 (aged 24)				31	
Hong Kong	Yip Pui Yin	6 August 1987 (aged 29)		34			
Hungary	Laura Sárosi	11 November 1992 (aged 23)		68			
India	Manu Attri	31 December 1992 (aged 23)			21		
India	Srikanth Kidambi	7 February 1993 (aged 23)	11				
India	B. Sumeeth Reddy	26 September 1991 (aged 24)			21		
India	Jwala Gutta	7 September 1983 (aged 32)				21	
India	Saina Nehwal	17 March 1990 (aged 26)		5			
India	Ashwini Ponnappa	18 September 1989 (aged 26)				21	
India	Pusarla Sindhu	5 July 1995 (aged 21)		10			
Indonesia	Tontowi Ahmad	18 July 1987 (aged 29)					3
Indonesia	Mohammad Ahsan	7 September 1987 (aged 28)			2		
Indonesia	Praveen Jordan	26 April 1993 (aged 23)					5
Indonesia	Hendra Setiawan	25 August 1984 (aged 31)			2		
Indonesia	Tommy Sugiarto	31 May 1988 (aged 28)	8				
Indonesia	Lindaweni Fanetri	18 January 1990 (aged 26)		25			
Indonesia	Nitya Krishinda Maheswari	16 December 1988 (aged 27)				4	
Indonesia	Liliyana Natsir	9 September 1985 (aged 30)					3
Indonesia	Greysia Polii	11 August 1987 (aged 28)				4	
Indonesia	Debby Susanto	3 May 1989 (aged 27)					5
Ireland	Scott Evans	26 September 1987 (aged 28)	74				
Ireland	Chloe Magee	29 November 1988 (aged 27)		58			
Israel	Misha Zilberman	30 January 1989 (aged 27)	52				
Italy	Jeanine Cicognini	14 November 1986 (aged 29)		61			
Japan	Hiroyuki Endo	16 December 1986 (aged 29)			8		
Japan	Kenichi Hayakawa	5 April 1986 (aged 30)			8		
Japan	Kenta Kazuno	25 November 1985 (aged 30)					15
Japan	Sho Sasaki	30 June 1982 (aged 34)	25				
Japan	Ayane Kurihara	27 September 1989 (aged 26)					15
Japan	Misaki Matsutomo	8 February 1992 (aged 24)				1	
Japan	Nozomi Okuhara	13 March 1995 (aged 21)		6			
Japan	Ayaka Takahashi	19 April 1990 (aged 26)				1	
Japan	Akane Yamaguchi	6 June 1997 (aged 19)		12			
Malaysia	Chan Peng Soon	27 April 1988 (aged 28)					10
Malaysia	Goh V Shem	20 May 1989 (aged 27)			12		
Malaysia	Lee Chong Wei	21 October 1982 (aged 33)	1				
Malaysia	Tan Wee Kiong	21 May 1989 (aged 27)			12		
Malaysia	Goh Liu Ying	30 May 1989 (aged 27)					10
Malaysia	Vivian Hoo	19 March 1990 (aged 26)				15	
Malaysia	Tee Jing Yi	8 February 1991 (aged 25)		29			
Malaysia	Woon Khe Wei	18 March 1989 (aged 27)				15	
Mexico	Lino Muñoz	8 February 1991 (aged 25)	73				
Mauritius	Kate Foo Kune	29 March 1993 (aged 23)		69			
Netherlands	Jacco Arends	28 January 1991 (aged 25)					17
Netherlands	Eefje Muskens	17 June 1989 (aged 27)				11	
Netherlands	Selena Piek	30 September 1991 (aged 24)				11	17
Poland	Adam Cwalina	26 January 1985 (aged 31)			25		
Poland	Adrian Dziółko	22 February 1990 (aged 26)	53				
Poland	Robert Mateusiak	13 January 1976 (aged 40)					13
Poland	Przemysław Wacha	31 January 1981 (aged 35)			25		
Poland	Nadieżda Zięba	21 May 1984 (aged 32)					13
Portugal	Pedro Martins	14 February 1990 (aged 26)	63				
Portugal	Telma Santos	1 August 1983 (aged 33)		67			
South Africa	Jacob Maliekal	1 January 1991 (aged 25)	78				
Russia	Vladimir Ivanov	3 July 1987 (aged 29)			13		
Russia	Vladimir Malkov	9 April 1986 (aged 30)	61				
Russia	Ivan Sozonov	6 July 1989 (aged 27)			13		
Russia	Natalia Perminova	14 November 1991 (aged 24)		55			
Singapore	Derek Wong	13 January 1989 (aged 27)	57				
Singapore	Liang Xiaoyu	11 January 1996 (aged 20)		30			
South Korea	Kim Gi-jung	14 August 1990 (aged 25)			3		
South Korea	Kim Sa-rang	22 August 1989 (aged 26)			3		
South Korea	Ko Sung-hyun	21 May 1987 (aged 29)					2
South Korea	Lee Dong-keun	20 November 1990 (aged 25)	16				
South Korea	Lee Yong-dae	11 September 1988 (aged 27)			1		
South Korea	Son Wan-ho	17 May 1988 (aged 28)	9				
South Korea	Yoo Yeon-seong	19 August 1986 (aged 29)			1		
South Korea	Bae Yeon-ju	26 October 1990 (aged 25)		17			
South Korea	Chang Ye-na	13 December 1989 (aged 26)				9	
South Korea	Jung Kyung-eun	20 March 1990 (aged 26)				5	
South Korea	Kim Ha-na	27 December 1989 (aged 26)					2
South Korea	Lee So-hee	14 June 1994 (aged 22)				9	
South Korea	Shin Seung-chan	6 December 1994 (aged 21)				5	
South Korea	Sung Ji-hyun	29 July 1991 (aged 25)		7			
Spain	Pablo Abián	12 June 1985 (aged 31)	43				
Spain	Carolina Marín	15 June 1993 (aged 23)		1			
Sri Lanka	Niluka Karunaratne	13 February 1985 (aged 31)	95				
Switzerland	Sabrina Jaquet	21 June 1987 (aged 29)		82			
Suriname	Sören Opti	16 May 1997 (aged 19)	326				
Sweden	Henri Hurskainen	13 September 1986 (aged 29)	50				
Thailand	Bodin Isara	12 December 1990 (aged 25)					14
Thailand	Boonsak Ponsana	22 February 1982 (aged 34)	32				
Thailand	Savitree Amitrapai	19 November 1988 (aged 27)					14
Thailand	Porntip Buranaprasertsuk	24 October 1991 (aged 24)		16			
Thailand	Ratchanok Intanon	5 February 1995 (aged 21)		4			
Thailand	Puttita Supajirakul	29 March 1996 (aged 20)				17	
Thailand	Sapsiree Taerattanachai	18 April 1992 (aged 24)				17	
Turkey	Özge Bayrak	14 February 1992 (aged 24)	52				
Ukraine	Artem Pochtarev	24 July 1993 (aged 23)	75				
Ukraine	Marija Ulitina	5 November 1991 (aged 24)		64			
United States	Phillip Chew	16 May 1994 (aged 22)			35		27
United States	Sattawat Pongnairat	8 May 1990 (aged 26)			35		
United States	Howard Shu	28 November 1990 (aged 25)	62				
United States	Eva Lee	7 August 1986 (aged 30)				26	
United States	Paula Lynn Obañana	19 March 1985 (aged 31)				26	
United States	Jamie Subandhi	15 February 1989 (aged 27)					27
United States	Iris Wang	2 September 1994 (aged 21)		35			
Vietnam	Nguyễn Tiến Minh	12 February 1983 (aged 33)	33				
Vietnam	Vũ Thị Trang	19 May 1992 (aged 24)		44			
