= 2015 Sudirman Cup knockout stage =

The knockout stage of the 2015 Sudirman Cup was the final phase of the competition, following the group stage. It began on 14 May with the quarterfinals and concluded on 17 May with the final match of the tournament, which was held at the Dongfeng Nissan Sports Center in Dongguan, China.

The top two teams from each group (eight in total) advanced to the knockout stage, competing in a single-elimination tournament. Meanwhile, the teams from Groups 2, 3 and 4 (twenty three in total) advanced to the classification stage, where they also competed in a single-elimination tournament.

== Qualified teams ==
=== Group 1 ===
Group	Winners	Runners-up
A	China	Germany
B	Japan	Chinese Taipei
C	Indonesia	Denmark
D	Malaysia	South Korea

=== Group 2 ===
Group	Winners	Runners-up	Third place	Fourth place
A	Netherlands	Singapore	Spain	Canada
B	Hong Kong	France	United States	Brazil

=== Group 3 ===
Group	Winners	Runners-up	Third place	Fourth place
A	Czech Republic	Austria	Turkey	South Africa
B	Vietnam	Australia	Switzerland	Italy

=== Group 4 ===
Group	Winners	Runners-up	Third place	Fourth place
A	Philippines	Iceland	Nigeria	
B	Sri Lanka	Israel	Kazakhstan	Seychelles

== Bracket ==
=== Group 1 ===
Quarterfinals
14 May
China	3
Germany	0
15 May
Indonesia	3
Chinese Taipei	1
14 May
South Korea	3
Malaysia	1
15 May
Denmark	2
Japan	3

Semifinals
16 May
China	3
Indonesia	1
16 May
South Korea	2
Japan	3

Final
17 May
China	3
Japan	0

=== Group 2 ===
Thirteenth place match
Netherlands	1
Hong Kong	3

Fifteenth place match
Singapore	2
France	3

Seventeenth place match
Spain	3
United States	1

Nineteenth place match
Canada	3
Brazil	1

=== Group 3 ===
Twenty-first place match
Czech Republic	0
Vietnam	3

Twenty-third place match
Austria	2
Australia	3

Twenty-fifth place match
Turkey	3
Switzerland	1

Twenty-seventh place match
South Africa	3
Italy	1

=== Group 4 ===
Twenty-ninth place match
Philippines	3
Sri Lanka	0

Thirty-first place match
Austria	3
Israel	1

Thirty-third place match
Nigeria	3
Kazakhstan	2

== Classification round ==
=== Thirty-third place match: Nigeria vs Kazakhstan ===
Nigeria
3
Dongfeng Nissan Sports Center, Court 4
15 May 2015, 13:00 UTC+8

Kazakhstan
2

			1	2	3
1	(Nigeria) (Kazakhstan)	Victor Makanju / Dorcas Ajoke Adesokan; Arman Murzabekov / Ilyana Filipchuk	21; 15	20; 22	23; 21
2	(Nigeria) (Kazakhstan)	Enejoh Abah; Artur Niyazov	21; 19	21; 19
3	(Nigeria) (Kazakhstan)	Grace Gabriel; Veronika Sorokina	21; 12	3; 21	12; 21
4	(Nigeria) (Kazakhstan)	Enejoh Abah / Victor Makanju; Khaitmurat Kulmatov / Artur Niyazov	9; 21	21; 15	17; 21
5	(Nigeria) (Kazakhstan)	Dorcas Ajoke Adesokan / Grace Gabriel; Ilyana Filipchuk / Veronika Sorokina	21; 19	21; 14

=== Thirty-first place match: Iceland vs Israel ===
Iceland
3
Dongfeng Nissan Sports Center, Court 5
15 May 2015, 13:00 UTC+8

Israel
1

			1	2	3
1	(Iceland) (Israel)	Daniel Thomsen / Rakel Jóhannesdóttir; Ariel Shainski / Alina Pugach	21; 18	22; 20
2	(Iceland) (Israel)	Kári Gunnarsson; Misha Zilberman	8; 21	12; 21
3	(Iceland) (Israel)	Margrét Jóhannsdóttir; Dana Kugel	21; 16	21; 11
4	(Iceland) (Israel)	Kári Gunnarsson / Atli Jóhannesson; Ariel Shainski / Misha Zilberman	21; 11	21; 19
5	(Iceland) (Israel)	Rakel Jóhannesdóttir / Margrét Jóhannsdóttir; Dana Kugel / Alina Pugach

=== Twenty-ninth place match: Philippines vs Sri Lanka ===
Philippines
3
Dongfeng Nissan Sports Center, Court 5
15 May 2015, 19:00 UTC+8

Sri Lanka
0

			1	2	3
1	(Philippines) (Sri Lanka)	Frell Keeyann Gabuelo; Nimmika Thisara	15; 21	21; 8	21; 6
2	(Philippines) (Sri Lanka)	Nicole Albo; Achini Ratnasiri	21; 14	21; 12
3	(Philippines) (Sri Lanka)	Peter Gabriel Magnaye / Paul Jefferson Vivas; Dakshika Gunatilleke / Nimmika Thisara	21; 9	21; 9
4	(Philippines) (Sri Lanka)	Alyssa Leonardo / Thea Pomar; Achini Ratnasiri / Lekha Shehani				not played
5	(Philippines) (Sri Lanka)	Paul Jefferson Vivas / Eleanor Inlayo; Dakshika Gunatilleke / Thilini Jayasinghe				not played

=== Twenty-seventh place match: South Africa vs Italy ===
South Africa
3
Dongfeng Nissan Sports Center, Court 3
15 May 2015, 19:00 UTC+8

Italy
1

			1	2	3
1	(South Africa) (Italy)	Andries Malan / Jennifer Fry; Matteo Bellucci / Karin Maran	21; 15	21; 12
2	(South Africa) (Italy)	Prakash Vijayanath; Rosario Maddaloni	14; 21	6; 21
3	(South Africa) (Italy)	Elme de Villiers; Lisa Iversen	21; 10	21; 16
4	(South Africa) (Italy)	Andries Malan / Willem Viljoen; Giovanni Greco / Rosario Maddaloni	23; 21	18; 21	21; 8
5	(South Africa) (Italy)	Michelle Butler-Emmett / Elme de Villiers; Jeanine Cicognini / Karin Maran				not played

=== Twenty-fifth place match: Turkey vs Switzerland ===
Turkey
3
Dongfeng Nissan Sports Center, Court 4
15 May 2015, 19:00 UTC+8

Switzerland
1

			1	2	3
1	(Turkey) (Switzerland)	Özge Bayrak; Sabrina Jaquet	15; 21	23; 25
2	(Turkey) (Switzerland)	Ramazan Öztürk; Christian Kirchmayr	12; 21	21; 18	21; 17
3	(Turkey) (Switzerland)	Özge Bayrak / Neslihan Yiğit; Céline Burkart / Cendrine Hantz	21; 12	21; 12
4	(Turkey) (Switzerland)	Emre Vural / Sinan Zorlu; Christian Kirchmayr / Oliver Schaller	21; 16	14; 21	21; 7
5	(Turkey) (Switzerland)	Ramazan Öztürk / Neslihan Yiğit; Anthony Dumartheray / Sabrina Jaquet				not played

=== Twenty-third place match: Austria vs Australia ===
Austria
2
Dongfeng Nissan Sports Center, Court 3
15 May 2015, 13:00 UTC+8

Australia
3

			1	2	3
1	(Austria) (Australia)	Luka Wraber; Daniel Guda	21; 10	21; 15
2	(Austria) (Australia)	Elisabeth Baldauf; Joy Lai	21; 14	21; 19
3	(Austria) (Australia)	Matthias Almer / David Obernosterer; Matthew Chau / Sawan Serasinghe	10; 21	17; 21
4	(Austria) (Australia)	Janine Lais / Nathalie Ziesig; Leanne Choo / Gronya Somerville	7; 21			retired
5	(Austria) (Australia)	Matthias Almer / Elisabeth Baldauf; Robin Middleton / Leanne Choo	12; 21	21; 15	18; 21

=== Twenty-first place match: Czech Republic vs Vietnam ===
Czech Republic
0
Dongfeng Nissan Sports Center, Court 1
15 May 2015, 19:00 UTC+8

Vietnam
3

			1	2	3
1	(Czech Republic) (Vietnam)	Jakub Bitman / Alžběta Bášová; Dương Bảo Đức / Thái Thị Hồng Gấm	21; 16	19; 21	15; 21
2	(Czech Republic) (Vietnam)	Petr Koukal; Nguyễn Tiến Minh	6; 21	12; 21
3	(Czech Republic) (Vietnam)	Zuzana Pavelková; Vũ Thị Trang	12; 21	12; 21
4	(Czech Republic) (Vietnam)	Jakub Bitman / Milan Ludík; Đào Mạnh Thắng / Lê Hà Anh				not played
5	(Czech Republic) (Vietnam)	Alžběta Bášová / Zuzana Pavelková; Phạm Như Thảo / Vũ Thị Trang				not played

=== Nineteenth place match: Canada vs Brazil ===
Canada
3
Dongfeng Nissan Sports Center, Court 5
14 May 2015, 19:00 UTC+8

Brazil
1

			1	2	3
1	(Canada) (Brazil)	Toby Ng / Alex Bruce; Alex Yuwan Tjong / Lohaynny Vicente	19; 21	21; 12	20; 22
2	(Canada) (Brazil)	Andrew D'Souza; Daniel Paiola	22; 20	21; 13
3	(Canada) (Brazil)	Rachel Honderich; Fabiana Silva	21; 16	21; 15
4	(Canada) (Brazil)	Adrian Liu / Derrick Ng; Hugo Arthuso / Daniel Paiola	21; 9	24; 22
5	(Canada) (Brazil)	Rachel Honderich / Michelle Li; Lohaynny Vicente / Luana Vicente				not played

=== Seventeenth place match: Spain vs United States ===
Spain
3
Dongfeng Nissan Sports Center, Court 4
14 May 2015, 19:00 UTC+8

United States
1

			1	2	3
1	(Spain) (United States)	Ernesto Velázquez / Beatriz Corrales; Phillip Chew / Jamie Subandhi	21; 18	14; 21	21; 18
2	(Spain) (United States)	Luís Enrique Peñalver; Sattawat Pongnairat	21; 16	14; 21	21; 18
3	(Spain) (United States)	Clara Azurmendi; Iris Wang	10; 21	10; 21
4	(Spain) (United States)	Pablo Abián / Ernesto Velázquez; Phillip Chew / Sattawat Pongnairat	13; 21	21; 19	21; 15
5	(Spain) (United States)	Beatriz Corrales / Carolina Marín; Eva Lee / Paula Lynn Obanana				not played

=== Fifteenth place match: Singapore vs France ===
Singapore
2
Dongfeng Nissan Sports Center, Court 3
14 May 2015, 19:00 UTC+8

France
3

			1	2	3
1	(Singapore) (France)	Danny Bawa Chrisnanta / Vanessa Neo; Ronan Labar / Émilie Lefel	12; 21	19; 21
2	(Singapore) (France)	Sean Lee; Thomas Rouxel	21; 16	22; 24	17; 21
3	(Singapore) (France)	Terry Hee / Chayut Triyachart; Baptiste Carême / Ronan Labar	21; 19	21; 14
4	(Singapore) (France)	Liang Xiaoyu; Delphine Lansac	21; 11	21; 14
5	(Singapore) (France)	Elaine Chua / Vanessa Neo; Émilie Lefel / Anne Tran	22; 20	16; 21	12; 21

=== Thirteenth place match: Netherlands vs Hong Kong China ===
Netherlands
1
Dongfeng Nissan Sports Center, Court 2
15 May 2025, 19:00 UTC+8

Hong Kong
4

			1	2	3
1	(Netherlands) (Hong Kong)	Jacco Arends / Jelle Maas; Or Chin Chung / Tang Chun Man	21; 17	21; 17
2	(Netherlands) (Hong Kong)	Soraya de Visch Eijbergen; Cheung Ngan Yi	14; 21	18; 21
3	(Netherlands) (Hong Kong)	Mark Caljouw; Ng Ka Long	21; 18	6; 21	16; 21
4	(Netherlands) (Hong Kong)	Eefje Muskens / Selena Piek; Poon Lok Yan / Tse Ying Suet	21; 18	20; 22	17; 21
5	(Netherlands) (Hong Kong)	Samantha Barning / Jorrit de Ruiter; Chau Hoi Wah / Lee Chun Hei				not played

== Quarter-finals ==
=== China vs Germany ===
China
3
Dongfeng Nissan Sports Center, Court 1
14 May 2015, 19:00 UTC+8

Germany
0

			1	2	3
1	(China) (Germany)	Zhang Nan / Zhao Yunlei; Michael Fuchs / Birgit Michels	21; 9	21; 11
2	(China) (Germany)	Lin Dan; Marc Zwiebler	21; 12	21; 15
3	(China) (Germany)	Fu Haifeng / Zhang Nan; Michael Fuchs / Peter Käsbauer	21; 15	21; 17
4	(China) (Germany)	Li Xuerui; Karin Schnaase				not played
5	(China) (Germany)	Tang Yuanting / Yu Yang; Isabel Herttrich / Birgit Michels				not played

=== Indonesia vs Chinese Taipei ===
Indonesia
3
Dongfeng Nissan Sports Center, Court 1
15 May 2015, 13:00 UTC+8

Chinese Taipei
1

			1	2	3
1	(Indonesia) (Chinese Taipei)	Mohammad Ahsan / Hendra Setiawan; Lee Sheng-mu / Tsai Chia-hsin	21; 17	21; 18
2	(Indonesia) (Chinese Taipei)	Bellaetrix Manuputty; Tai Tzu-ying	17; 21	17; 21
3	(Indonesia) (Chinese Taipei)	Jonatan Christie; Hsu Jen-hao	21; 12	13; 21	21; 16
4	(Indonesia) (Chinese Taipei)	Nitya Krishinda Maheswari / Greysia Polii; Hsieh Pei-chen / Wu Ti-jung	21; 14	21; 9
5	(Indonesia) (Chinese Taipei)	Tontowi Ahmad / Liliyana Natsir; Wang Chi-lin / Chen Hsiao-huan				not played

=== South Korea vs Malaysia ===
South Korea
3
Dongfeng Nissan Sports Center, Court 2
14 May 2015, 19:00 UTC+8

Malaysia
1

			1	2	3
1	(South Korea) (Malaysia)	Lee Yong-dae / Yoo Yeon-seong; Goh V Shem / Tan Wee Kiong	21; 18	21; 16
2	(South Korea) (Malaysia)	Sung Ji-hyun; Tee Jing Yi	21; 17	21; 12
3	(South Korea) (Malaysia)	Son Wan-ho; Lee Chong Wei	17; 21	12; 21
4	(South Korea) (Malaysia)	Chang Ye-na / Jung Kyung-eun; Vivian Hoo Kah Mun / Woon Khe Wei	21; 23	21; 16	21; 11
5	(South Korea) (Malaysia)	Kim Ki-jung / Shin Seung-chan; Chan Peng Soon / Goh Liu Ying				not played

=== Denmark vs Japan ===
Denmark
2
Dongfeng Nissan Sports Center, Court 2
15 May 2015, 13:00 UTC+8

Japan
3

			1	2	3
1	(Denmark) (Japan)	Mads Pieler Kolding / Sara Thygesen; Kenta Kazuno / Ayane Kurihara	21; 9	16; 21	21; 13
2	(Denmark) (Japan)	Viktor Axelsen; Kento Momota	15; 21	21; 17	9; 21
3	(Denmark) (Japan)	Line Kjaersfeldt; Nozomi Okuhara	12; 21	8; 21
4	(Denmark) (Japan)	Kim Astrup / Mads Pieler Kolding; Hiroyuki Endo / Kenichi Hayakawa	21; 19	21; 15
5	(Denmark) (Japan)	Line Kjaersfeldt / Sara Thygesen; Misaki Matsutomo / Ayaka Takahashi	21; 19	7; 21	19; 21

== Semi-finals ==
=== China vs Indonesia ===
China
3
Dongfeng Nissan Sports Center, Court 1
16 May 2015, 13:00 UTC+8

Indonesia
1

			1	2	3
1	(China) (Indonesia)	Cai Yun / Fu Haifeng; Mohammad Ahsan / Hendra Setiawan	16; 21	17; 21
2	(China) (Indonesia)	Li Xuerui; Bellaetrix Manuputty	3; 5			retired
3	(China) (Indonesia)	Chen Long; Jonatan Christie	21; 10	21; 15
4	(China) (Indonesia)	Tang Yuanting / Yu Yang; Nitya Krishinda Maheswari / Greysia Polii	17; 21	21; 17	21; 15
5	(China) (Indonesia)	Zhang Nan / Zhao Yunlei; Tontowi Ahmad / Liliyana Natsir				not played

=== South Korea vs Japan ===
South Korea
2
Dongfeng Nissan Sports Center, Court 1
16 May 2015, 19:00 UTC+8

Japan
3

			1	2	3
1	(South Korea) (Japan)	Lee Yong-dae / Yoo Yeon-seong; Hirokatsu Hashimoto / Noriyasu Hirata	21; 18	21; 16
2	(South Korea) (Japan)	Sung Ji-hyun; Nozomi Okuhara	21; 11	17; 21	14; 21
3	(South Korea) (Japan)	Son Wan-ho; Takuma Ueda	21; 9	22; 20
4	(South Korea) (Japan)	Chang Ye-na / Jung Kyung-eun; Misaki Matsutomo / Ayaka Takahashi	17; 21	8; 21
5	(South Korea) (Japan)	Ko Sung-hyun / Kim Ha-na; Kenta Kazuno / Ayane Kurihara	14; 21	15; 21

== Final ==
=== China vs Japan ===
China
3
Dongfeng Nissan Sports Center, Court 1
17 May 2015, 14:00 UTC+8

Japan
0

			1	2	3
1	(China) (Japan)	Fu Haifeng / Zhang Nan; Hiroyuki Endo / Kenichi Hayakawa	21; 17	20; 22	21; 17
2	(China) (Japan)	Li Xuerui; Akane Yamaguchi	23; 21	21; 14
3	(China) (Japan)	Lin Dan; Takuma Ueda	21; 15	21; 13
4	(China) (Japan)	Ma Jin / Tang Yuanting; Misaki Matsutomo / Ayaka Takahashi				not played
5	(China) (Japan)	Zhang Nan / Zhao Yunlei; Kenta Kazuno / Ayane Kurihara				not played
