= 2015 Sudirman Cup =

Badminton championships

Tournament details
- Dates: 10–17 May 2015
- Edition: 14th
- Level: International
- Venue: Dongfeng Nissan Sports Center
- Location: Dongguan, China

The 2015 Sudirman Cup was the fourteenth tournament of the Sudirman Cup. It was held in Dongguan, China.

== Host city selection ==
Dongguan is the only city to submit a bid for 2015 Sudirman Cup. Badminton World Federation awarded the event to Dongguan during BWF Council Meeting in Athens, Greece.

== Seedings ==
The seedings for teams competing in the tournament were released on March 5, 2015. It was based on aggregated points from the best players in the world ranking. The tournament was divided into four groups, with twelve teams in the elite group competing for the title. Eight teams were seeded into second and third groups and seven teams were seeded into fourth group. The draw was held on March 16, 2015.

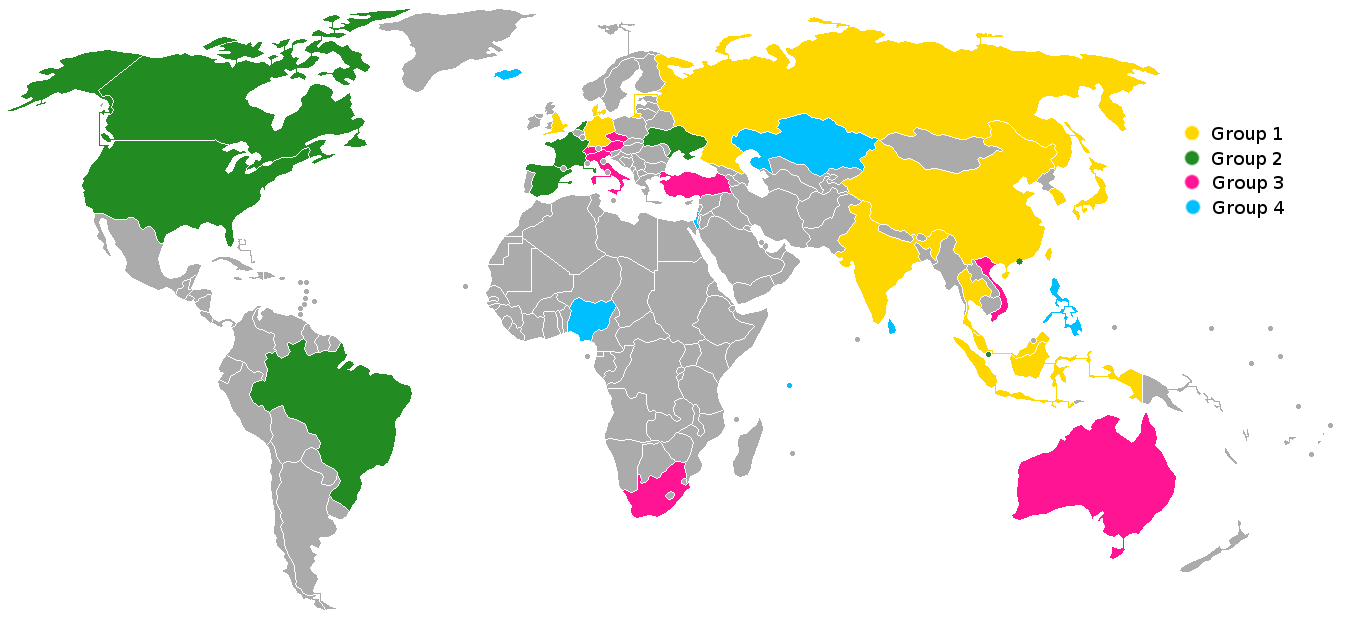
Nations to compete at the 2015 Sudirman Cup

=== Group 1 ===
1. China
2. South Korea
3. Denmark
4. Japan
5. Indonesia
6. Chinese Taipei
7. Thailand
8. India
9. Germany
10. Malaysia
11. England
12. Russia

=== Group 2 ===
13. Singapore
14. Hong Kong
15. Netherlands
16. United States
17. France
18. Canada
19. Brazil
20. Spain

=== Group 3 ===
21. Czech Republic
22. Vietnam
23. Turkey
24. Australia
25. Italy
26. South Africa
27. Austria
28. Switzerland

=== Group 4 ===
29. Nigeria
30. Israel
31. Philippines
32. Sri Lanka
33. Seychelles
34. Iceland
35. Kazakhstan

== Group stage ==
=== Group 1A ===
Pos	Team	Pld	W	L	MF	MA	MD	GF	GA	GD	PF	PA	PD	Pts	Qualification	People's Republic of China	Germany	Thailand
1	China (H)	2	2	0	10	0	+10	20	2	+18	449	307	+142	2	Advance to knockout stages	—	4–1	3–2
2	Germany	2	1	1	3	7	−4	6	17	−11	341	443	−102	1	Advance to knockout stages		—	3–2
3	Thailand	2	0	2	2	8	−6	9	16	−7	418	458	−40	0				—

Source: BWF
(H) Host

=== Group 1B ===
Pos	Team	Pld	W	L	MF	MA	MD	GF	GA	GD	PF	PA	PD	Pts	Qualification	Japan	Chinese Taipei for Olympic games	Russia
1	Japan	2	2	0	8	2	+6	16	7	+9	444	375	+69	2	Advance to knockout stages	—	4–1	4–1
2	Chinese Taipei	2	1	1	5	5	0	12	12	0	437	431	+6	1	Advance to knockout stages		—	4–1
3	Russia	2	0	2	2	8	−6	7	16	−9	361	436	−75	0				—

Source: BWF

=== Group 1C ===
Pos	Team	Pld	W	L	MF	MA	MD	GF	GA	GD	PF	PA	PD	Pts	Qualification	Indonesia	Denmark	England
1	Indonesia	2	2	0	6	4	+2	13	9	+4	408	360	+48	2	Advance to knockout stages	—	3–2	3–2
2	Denmark	2	1	1	6	4	+2	13	10	+3	428	403	+25	1	Advance to knockout stages		—	4–1
3	England	2	0	2	3	7	−4	7	14	−7	343	416	−73	0				—

Source: BWF

=== Group 1D ===
Pos	Team	Pld	W	L	MF	MA	MD	GF	GA	GD	PF	PA	PD	Pts	Qualification	Malaysia	South Korea	India
1	Malaysia	2	2	0	6	4	+2	13	9	+4	414	402	+12	2	Advance to knockout stages	—	3–2	3–2
2	South Korea	2	1	1	6	4	+2	14	10	+4	456	413	+43	1	Advance to knockout stages		—	4–1
3	India	2	0	2	3	7	−4	8	16	−8	414	469	−55	0				—

Source: BWF

=== Group 2A ===
Pos	Team	Pld	W	L	MF	MA	MD	GF	GA	GD	PF	PA	PD	Pts	Qualification	Netherlands	Singapore	Spain	Canada
1	Netherlands	3	3	0	10	5	+5	22	13	+9	670	598	+72	3	Advance to classification rounds	—	4–1	3–2	3–2
2	Singapore	3	2	1	7	8	−1	16	16	0	583	580	+3	2	Advance to classification rounds		—	3–2	3–2
3	Spain	3	1	2	7	8	−1	16	20	−4	636	657	−21	1	Advance to classification rounds			—	3–2
4	Canada	3	0	3	6	9	−3	16	21	−5	636	690	−54	0	Advance to classification rounds				—

Source: BWF

=== Group 2B ===
Pos	Team	Pld	W	L	MF	MA	MD	GF	GA	GD	PF	PA	PD	Pts	Qualification	Hong Kong	France	United States	Brazil
1	Hong Kong	3	3	0	15	0	+15	30	4	+26	695	508	+187	3	Advance to classification rounds	—	5–0	5–0	5–0
2	France	3	2	1	7	8	−1	17	19	−2	645	648	−3	2	Advance to classification rounds		—	3–2	4–1
3	United States	3	1	2	6	9	−3	15	19	−4	616	621	−5	1	Advance to classification rounds			—	4–1
4	Brazil	3	0	3	2	13	−11	7	27	−20	498	677	−179	0	Advance to classification rounds				—

Source: BWF

=== Group 3A ===
Pos	Team	Pld	W	L	MF	MA	MD	GF	GA	GD	PF	PA	PD	Pts	Qualification	Czech Republic	Austria	Turkey	South Africa
1	Czech Republic	3	3	0	10	5	+5	21	13	+8	670	644	+26	3	Advance to classification rounds	—	4–1	3–2	3–2
2	Austria	3	2	1	8	7	+1	19	16	+3	653	604	+49	2	Advance to classification rounds		—	3–2	4–1
3	Turkey	3	1	2	7	8	−1	17	17	0	627	586	+41	1	Advance to classification rounds			—	3–2
4	South Africa	3	0	3	5	10	−5	12	23	−11	569	685	−116	0	Advance to classification rounds				—

Source: BWF

=== Group 3B ===
Pos	Team	Pld	W	L	MF	MA	MD	GF	GA	GD	PF	PA	PD	Pts	Qualification	Vietnam	Australia	Switzerland	Italy
1	Vietnam	3	3	0	12	3	+9	24	9	+15	653	474	+179	3	Advance to classification rounds	—	3–2	4–1	5–0
2	Australia	3	2	1	9	6	+3	20	14	+6	601	593	+8	2	Advance to classification rounds		—	3–2	4–1
3	Switzerland	3	1	2	6	9	−3	15	19	−4	605	611	−6	1	Advance to classification rounds			—	3–2
4	Italy	3	0	3	3	12	−9	7	24	−17	444	625	−181	0	Advance to classification rounds				—

Source: BWF

=== Group 4A ===
Pos	Team	Pld	W	L	MF	MA	MD	GF	GA	GD	PF	PA	PD	Pts	Qualification	Philippines	Iceland	Nigeria
1	Philippines	2	2	0	9	1	+8	18	4	+14	445	315	+130	2	Advance to classification rounds	—	4–1	5–0
2	Iceland	2	1	1	4	6	−2	9	12	−3	363	383	−20	1	Advance to classification rounds		—	3–2
3	Nigeria	2	0	2	2	8	−6	6	17	−11	351	461	−110	0	Advance to classification rounds			—

Source: BWF

=== Group 4B ===
Pos	Team	Pld	W	L	MF	MA	MD	GF	GA	GD	PF	PA	PD	Pts	Qualification	Sri Lanka	Israel	Kazakhstan	Seychelles
1	Sri Lanka	3	3	0	10	5	+5	22	12	+10	640	572	+68	3	Advance to classification rounds	—	3–2	3–2	4–1
2	Israel	3	2	1	9	6	+3	18	12	+6	547	482	+65	2	Advance to classification rounds		—	3–2	4–1
3	Kazakhstan	3	1	2	8	7	+1	17	17	0	638	620	+18	1	Advance to classification rounds			—	4–1
4	Seychelles	3	0	3	3	12	−9	9	25	−16	519	670	−151	0	Advance to classification rounds				—

Source: BWF

== Knockout stage ==
=== Classification bracket ===
Thirteenth place match
Netherlands	1
Hong Kong	3

Fifteenth place match
Singapore	2
France	3

Seventeenth place match
Spain	3
United States	1

Nineteenth place match
Canada	3
Brazil	1

Twenty-first place match
Czech Republic	0
Vietnam	3

Twenty-third place match
Austria	2
Australia	3

Twenty-fifth place match
Turkey	3
Switzerland	1

Twenty-seventh place match
South Africa	3
Italy	1

Twenty-ninth place match
Philippines	3
Sri Lanka	0

Thirty-first place match
Austria	3
Israel	1

Thirty-third place match
Nigeria	3
Kazakhstan	2

Team 1	Score	Team 2
Netherlands	1–3	Hong Kong
Singapore	3–2	France
Spain	3–1	United States
Canada	3–1	Brazil
Czech Republic	0–3	Vietnam
Austria	2–3	Australia
Turkey	3–1	Switzerland
South Africa	3–1	Italy
Philippines	3–0	Sri Lanka
Iceland	3–1	Israel
Nigeria	3–2	Kazakhstan

=== Final bracket ===
The draw for the quarterfinals was held after the completion of the final matches in the group stage on May 13, 2015.

Quarterfinals
14 May
China	3
Germany	0
15 May
Indonesia	3
Chinese Taipei	1
14 May
South Korea	3
Malaysia	1
15 May
Denmark	2
Japan	3

Semifinals
16 May
China	3
Indonesia	1
16 May
South Korea	2
Japan	3

Final
17 May
China	3
Japan	0

=== Quarterfinals ===
Team 1	Score	Team 2
China	3–0	Germany
Indonesia	3–1	Chinese Taipei
South Korea	3–1	Malaysia
Denmark	2–3	Japan

=== Semifinals ===
Team 1	Score	Team 2
China	3–1	Indonesia
South Korea	2–3	Japan

=== Final ===
Team 1	Score	Team 2
China	3–0	Japan

2015 Sudirman Cup champion

China
10th title

== Final standings ==
1. China
2. Japan
3. South Korea
3. Indonesia
5. Denmark
5. Germany
5. Malaysia
5. Chinese Taipei
9. England
9. India
9. Thailand
9. Russia
13. Hong Kong
14. Netherlands
15. France
16. Singapore
17. Spain
18. United States
19. Canada
20. Brazil
21. Vietnam
22. Czech Republic
23. Australia
24. Austria
25. Turkey
26. Switzerland
27. South Africa
28. Italy
29. Philippines
30. Sri Lanka
31. Iceland
32. Israel
33. Nigeria
34. Kazakhstan
35. Seychelles
