= Heri Setiawan =

Bahraini badminton player (born 1987)

Personal information
- Born: Heri Setiawan Dwi Cahyono; 15 September 1987 (age 39) Klaten, Indonesia

Sport
- Country: Indonesia (2006–08); Bahrain (2009–16)
- Sport: Badminton

Men's
- Highest ranking: 168 (MS) 28 Jul 2011; 95 (MD) 22 Dec 2011; 236 (XD) 7 Nov 2013
- BWF profile

Heri Setiawan Dwi Cahyono (born 15 September 1987) is an Indonesian-born badminton player who represented Bahrain in international tournaments.

== Achievements ==
=== BWF International Challenge/Series ===
Men's singles
| Year | Tournament | Opponent | Score | Result |
|---|---|---|---|---|
| 2012 | Syria International | (Iran) Ali Shahhosseini | 21-14, 21–19 | (gold) Winner |

Men's doubles
| Year | Tournament | Partner | Opponent | Score | Result |
|---|---|---|---|---|---|
| 2014 | Bahrain International | (Bahrain) Ebrahim Jafar Al Sayed Jafar | (Malaysia) Muhammad Hafifi Hashim (Malaysia) Muhammad Hafizi Hashim | 21-19, 20–22, 19–21 | (silver) Runner-up |
| 2010 | Syria International | (Bahrain) Ebrahim Jafar Al Sayed Jafar | (Pakistan) Kashif Sulehri (Pakistan) Rizwan Azam | 18-21, 18–21 | (silver) Runner-up |
| 2009 | Bahrain International | (Bahrain) Ebrahim Jafar Al Sayed Jafar | (India) Aneesh Aneefa Kannangayath (India) Sanave Thomas | 16-21, 14–21 | (silver) Runner-up |

Mixed doubles
| Year | Tournament | Partner | Opponent | Score | Result |
|---|---|---|---|---|---|
| 2014 | Bahrain International | (Bahrain) Rehana Sunder | (Austria) David Obernosterer (Austria) Elisabeth Baldauf | 13-21, 14–21 | (silver) Runner-up |
| 2012 | Bahrain International Challenge | (Bahrain) Rehana Sunder | (India) Tanveer Gill (India) Mohita Sahdev | 11-21, 21–17, 14–21 | (silver) Runner-up |

BWF International Challenge tournament
BWF International Series tournament
BWF Future Series tournament
