= Sanyogita Ghorpade =

Indian badminton player (born 1992)

Personal information
- Born: 5 November 1992 (age 34) Pune, Maharashtra, India
- Height: 1.72 m (5 ft 8 in)

Sport
- Country: India
- Sport: Badminton

Women's singles & doubles
- Highest ranking: 195 (WS 21 April 2011); 76 (WD 14 June 2018); 204 (XD 29 January 2015)
- BWF profile

Sanyogita Ghorpade (born 5 November 1992) is an Indian badminton player. She trained at the Gopichand Badminton Academy for four years, but returned to the Nikhil Kanetkar Badminton Academy in Balewadi, Pune after the injuries. She was the women's doubles runner-up at the 2013 Bahrain International Series and Challenge tournament. She was Part of North eastern warriors in Season 3 Of PBL and in Season 4 she will play for Awadhe warriors. She has also represented India in world championship and Uber Cup.

== Achievements ==
=== BWF World Tour (1 runner-up) ===
The BWF World Tour, which was announced on 19 March 2017 and implemented in 2018, is a series of elite badminton tournaments sanctioned by the Badminton World Federation (BWF). The BWF World Tours are divided into levels of World Tour Finals, Super 1000, Super 750, Super 500, Super 300 (part of the HSBC World Tour), and the BWF Tour Super 100.

Women's doubles
Year	Tournament	Level	Partner	Opponent	Score	Result
2022	Odisha Open	Super 100	(India) Shruti Mishra	(India) Gayathri Gopichand (India) Treesa Jolly	12–21, 10–21	(silver) Runner-up

=== BWF International Challenge/Series (5 runners-up) ===
Women's doubles
Year	Tournament	Partner	Opponent	Score	Result
2013	Bahrain International	(India) Aparna Balan	(India) Prajakta Sawant (India) Arathi Sara Sunil	21–18, 18–21, 16–21	(silver) Runner-up
2013	Bahrain International Challenge	(India) Aparna Balan	(India) Pradnya Gadre (India) N. Sikki Reddy	13–21, 21–19, 5–21	(silver) Runner-up
2017	Mauritius International	(India) Prajakta Sawant	(Germany) Lisa Kaminski (Germany) Hannah Pohl	18–21, 20–22	(silver) Runner-up
2017	Egypt International	(India) Prajakta Sawant	(Belarus) Anastasiya Cherniavskaya (Belarus) Alesia Zaitsava	17–21, 18–21	(silver) Runner-up
2019	Egypt International	(India) Kuhoo Garg	(India) Simran Singhi (India) Ritika Thaker	16–21, 21–19, 19–21	(silver) Runner-up

BWF International Challenge tournament
BWF International Series tournament
