= Arathi Sara Sunil =

Indian badminton player (born 1994)

Personal information
- Born: 1 October 1994 (age 32) Kochi, Kerala, India

Sport
- Country: India
- Sport: Badminton

Women's singles and doubles
- Highest ranking: 152 (WS 17 April 2014); 33 (WD 27 April 2017); 273 (XD 20 September 2018)
- BWF profile
Medal record
Women's badminton
Representing India
Asia Junior Championships
Bronze medal – third place	2011 Lucknow	Mixed team

Arathi Sara Sunil (born 1 October 1994) is an Indian badminton player. She participated at the 2018 Asian Games.

== Achievements ==
=== BWF International Challenge/Series (7 titles, 3 runners-up) ===
Women's doubles
Year	Tournament	Partner	Opponent	Score	Result
2013	Bahrain International	(India) Prajakta Sawant	(India) Aparna Balan (India) Sanyogita Ghorpade	18–21, 21–18, 21–16	(gold) Winner
2013	Bangladesh International	(India) Prajakta Sawant	(India) Dhanya Nair (India) Mohita Sahdev	22–20, 15–4 retired	(gold) Winner
2015	Bahrain International	(India) Poorvisha S. Ram	(Pakistan) Palwasha Bashir (Pakistan) Sara Mohmand	21–14, 21–8	(gold) Winner
2016	Polish International	(India) Sanjana Santosh	(Ukraine) Natalya Voytsekh (Ukraine) Yelyzaveta Zharka	19–21, 21–19, 21–14	(gold) Winner
2017	Polish International	(India) K. Maneesha	(England) Jenny Moore (England) Victoria Williams	19–21, 22–24	(silver) Runner-up
2018	Hellas Open	(India) Rutaparna Panda	(France) Vimala Hériau (France) Margot Lambert	21–19, 21–12	(gold) Winner
2021	Bangladesh International	(India) Mehreen Riza	(Malaysia) Kasturi Radhakrishnan (Malaysia) Venosha Radhakrishnan	22–20, 21–12	(gold) Winner
2022 (II)	India International	(India) Pooja Dandu	(Japan) Chisato Hoshi (Japan) Miyu Takahashi	21–12, 12–21, 7–21	(silver) Runner-up
2024 (I)	India International	(India) Varshini Viswanath Sri	(India) Priya Konjengbam (India) Shruti Mishra	18–21, 13–21	(silver) Runner-up
2024 (II)	India International	(India) Varshini Viswanath Sri	(India) Kavya Gupta (India) Radhika Sharma	21–18, 21–19	(gold) Winner

BWF International Challenge tournament
BWF International Series tournament
BWF Future Series tournament
