= Bahrain International Series =

Open international badminton tournament

Bahrain International Series is an open international badminton tournament in Bahrain presented by the Bahrain Badminton and Squash Federation, and sanctioned by Badminton World Federation and Badminton Asia. This tournament has been a BWF International Series level, and a part of Bahrain International Badminton Festival. Another tournament for higher tournament level on Bahrain Festival is Bahrain International Challenge.

== Previous winners ==
| Year | Men's singles | Women's singles | Men's doubles | Women's doubles | Mixed doubles | Ref |
|---|---|---|---|---|---|---|
| 2002 | (Iran) Ali Shahhosseini | (Syria) Eva Katrib | (Iran) Afshin Bozorgzadeh (Iran) Ali Shahhosseini | No competition | (Syria) Tarek Shalhoum (Syria) Hadil Kareem | |
| 2003– 2005 | No competition | | | | | |
| 2006 | Cancelled | | | | | |
| 2007 | (Japan) Sho Sasaki | (Italy) Agnese Allegrini | (Germany) Jochen Cassel (Germany) Thomas Tesche | (Indonesia) Shendy Puspa Irawati (Indonesia) Meiliana Jauhari | (Indonesia) David Pohan (Indonesia) Meiliana Jauhari | |
| 2008 | No competition | | | | | |
| 2009 | (Iran) Ali Shahhosseini | (Bahrain) Aprilsasi Putri Lejarsar Variella | (India) Aneesh Aneefa (India) Sanave Thomas | (Iran) Negin Amiripour (Iran) Nejatzadeh-Sahar Zamanian | (Bahrain) Jaffer Ebrahim (Bahrain) Aprilsasi Putri Lejarsar Variella | |
| 2010– 2012 | No competition | | | | | |
| 2013 | (India) Sameer Verma | (India) Saili Rane | (India) K. Nandagopal (India) Valiyaveetil Diju | (India) Prajakta Sawant (India) Arathi Sara Sunil | (India) Arun Vishnu (India) Aparna Balan | |
| 2014 | (India) Subhankar Dey | (India) Riya Pillai | (Malaysia) Muhammad Hafifi Hashim (Malaysia) Muhammad Hafizi Hashim | (Uzbekistan) Surayyo Ahmadjonova (Uzbekistan) Mariya Pakina | (Austria) David Obernosterer (Austria) Elisabeth Baldauf | |
| 2015 | (India) Sameer Verma | (Malaysia) Yang Li Lian | (Malaysia) Tan Wee Tat (Malaysia) Tan Yip Jiun | (India) Poorvisha Ram S. (India) Arathi Sara Sunil | (Malaysia) Tan Yip Jiun (Malaysia) Yang Li Lian | |
| 2016– 2017 | No competition | | | | | |
| 2018 | (Azerbaijan) Ade Resky Dwicahyo | (Indonesia) Sri Fatmawati | (Azerbaijan) Ade Resky Dwicahyo (Azerbaijan) Azmy Qowimuramadhoni | (Bahrain) Rachel Jacob Cherickal (Bahrain) Jasmine Joy Bacani | (Jordan) Bahaedeen Ahmad Alshannik (Jordan) Domou Amro | |
| 2019 | (India) Priyanshu Rajawat | (Indonesia) Sri Fatmawati | (Thailand) Prad Tangsrirapeephan (Thailand) Apichasit Teerawiwat | (Peru) Daniela Macías (Peru) Dánica Nishimura | (India) Venkat Gaurav Prasad (India) Juhi Dewangan | |
| 2020 | Cancelled (Note: This tournament, originally to be played from 1 to 4 October, was later cancelled due to the COVID-19 pandemic in Bahrain.) | | | | | |
| 2021 | (Indonesia) Bobby Setiabudi | (Indonesia) Aisyah Sativa Fatetani | (Indonesia) Amri Syahnawi (Indonesia) Christopher David Wijaya | (Hong Kong) Yeung Nga Ting (Hong Kong) Yeung Pui Lam | (Hong Kong) Lee Chun Hei (Hong Kong) Ng Tsz Yau | |
| 2022 | (Germany) Kai Schäfer | (Chinese Taipei) Wang Yu-si | (Thailand) Tanadon Punpanich (Thailand) Wachirawit Sothon | (Chinese Taipei) Liang Ting-yu (Chinese Taipei) Wu Ti-jung | (England) Gregory Mairs (England) Jenny Moore | |
| 2023 | (China) Wang Zhengxing | (China) Chen Lu | (China) Xie Haonan (China) Zeng Weihan | (China) Wang Tingge (China) Wang Yiduo | (China) Ma Xixiang (China) Wu Mengying | |
| 2024 I | (India) Kavin Thangam Kavin | (India) Prakriti Bharath | (Philippines) Solomon Padiz Jr. (Philippines) Julius Villabrille | (India) Annanya Pravin (India) Prerana N. Shet | (Bulgaria) Evgeni Panev (Bulgaria) Gabriela Stoeva | |
| 2024 II | (India) Manraj Singh | (Japan) Nanami Someya | (Philippines) Christian Bernardo (Philippines) Alvin Morada | (Bulgaria) Gabriela Stoeva (Bulgaria) Stefani Stoeva | (Kazakhstan) Dmitriy Panarin (Kazakhstan) Aisha Zhumabek | |
| 2025 | No competition | | | | | |

== Performances by countries ==
As of the 2024 II edition

| Pos. | Country | MS | WS | MD | WD | XD | Total |
|---|---|---|---|---|---|---|---|
| 1 | India | 6 | 3 | 2 | 3 | 2 | 16 |
| 2 | Indonesia | 1 | 3 | 1 | 1 | 1 | 7 |
| 3 | China | 1 | 1 | 1 | 1 | 1 | 5 |
| 4 | Iran | 2 | 0 | 1 | 1 | 0 | 4 |
| 4 | Malaysia | 0 | 1 | 2 | 0 | 1 | 4 |
| 6 | Bahrain | 0 | 1 | 0 | 1 | 1 | 3 |
| 7 | Azerbaijan | 1 | 0 | 1 | 0 | 0 | 2 |
| 7 | Bulgaria | 0 | 0 | 0 | 1 | 1 | 2 |
| 7 | Chinese Taipei | 0 | 1 | 0 | 1 | 0 | 2 |
| 7 | Germany | 1 | 0 | 1 | 0 | 0 | 2 |
| 7 | Hong Kong | 0 | 0 | 0 | 1 | 1 | 2 |
| 7 | Japan | 1 | 1 | 0 | 0 | 0 | 2 |
| 7 | Philippines | 0 | 0 | 2 | 0 | 0 | 2 |
| 7 | Syria | 0 | 1 | 0 | 0 | 1 | 2 |
| 7 | Thailand | 0 | 0 | 2 | 0 | 0 | 2 |
| 16 | Austria | 0 | 0 | 0 | 0 | 1 | 1 |
| 16 | England | 0 | 0 | 0 | 0 | 1 | 1 |
| 16 | Italy | 0 | 1 | 0 | 0 | 0 | 1 |
| 16 | Jordan | 0 | 0 | 0 | 0 | 1 | 1 |
| 16 | Kazakhstan | 0 | 0 | 0 | 0 | 1 | 1 |
| 16 | Peru | 0 | 0 | 0 | 1 | 0 | 1 |
| 16 | Uzbekistan | 0 | 0 | 0 | 1 | 0 | 1 |
| Total | | 13 | 13 | 13 | 12 | 13 | 64 |
