= Dhanya Nair =

Indian badminton player

Personal information
- Born: Dhanya Nair; 16 July 1984 (age 42)

Sport
- Country: India
- Sport: Badminton
- Handedness: Right
- Event: Women's Singles

Women's Singles
- BWF profile

Dhanya Nair (born 16 July 1984) is an Indian professional badminton player.

== Early life and education ==
Nair was born on 16 July 1984 in Palakkad, Kerala and was brought up in Pune, Maharashta. She finished her schooling from Symbiosis and graduation in Commerce from Shivray Prathishtan Maharashtra College, Pune.

== Career ==
Nair has represented Maharashtra state in All India Badminton tournaments since 1995.

Nair's first taste of success at the national level was in 1997, when she won the mini girls’ doubles category, at the mini national tournament in Guwahati. The following year, she won a silver medal at the school games in Patiala.

Nair dominated the 2002 season, emerging winner in the girls doubles category of ICICI Bank All India Tournament at Bangalore, the All India Junior in Thane, Sushant Chipalkatti tournament in Pune and Krishna Khaitan Memorial tournament in Chennai. She was runner-up in National Games in Hyderabad and a semi-finalist in junior nationals in Guntur. Nair won women's doubles crown in Asian Satellite Tournament at Islamabad, Pakistan in 2004. She emerged a winner while representing Indian Railways in the World Railways Competition and repeated her performance in 2009. In the same year, she achieved a double crown, winning both the women's singles and doubles in the Yonex Kenya International tournament at Nairobi. She was the first Indian player to achieve this feat.

In the 22nd edition of the World Championships in August 2015, Nair was a part of 18 member squad led by Saina Nehwal. In the squad, she was paired with Mohita Sahdev in the women's double category. Together they took on French players Delphine Lansac and Emilie Lefel.

Nair and Mohita Sahdev paired up in a number of tournaments in 2015, including the Thailand International Challenge, Malaysia Masters, Syed Modi International, and broke into the top 100 in the world.

== Achievements ==
=== BWF International ===
Women's singles
Year	Tournament	Opponent	Score	Result
2011	Iran Fajr International	(Canada) Nicole Grether	12–21, 22–24	(silver) Runner-up

Women's doubles
Year	Tournament	Partner	Opponent	Score	Result
2009	Kenya International	(India) Anita Ohlan	(South Africa) Michelle Claire Edwards (South Africa) Annari Viljoen	17–21, 21–15, 23–21	(gold) Winner
2010	Bahrain International	(India) Mohita Sahdev	(Canada) Charmaine Reid (Canada) Nicole Grether	21–23, 11–21	(silver) Runner-up
2011	Uganda International	(India) Mohita Sahdev	(Turkey) Özge Bayrak (Turkey) Öznur Çalışkan	14–21, 21–12, 14–21	(silver) Runner-up
2013	Bangladesh International	(India) Mohita Sahdev	(India) Prajakta Sawant (India) Arathi Sara Sunil	20–22, 4–15^{r}	(silver) Runner-up

BWF International Challenge tournament
BWF International Series tournament
BWF Future Series tournament

== Awards ==
=== National Level ===
- March 2017 - Kolkata All India Doubles Tournament, Silver
- February 2017 - Davengere All India Doubles Tournament, Silver
- March 2016 - Valsad All India Tournament, Silver
- August 2015 - Pune All India Tournament,

Bronze

- April 2015 - Blore All India Tournament, Silver
- February 2015 - Senior Nationals Championships Vijayawada, Bronze
- December 2014 - Kochi All India Senior Tournament, Silver

November 2014 - Gandhidham All India Senior Tournament, Silver October 2014 - Bhilwara All India Tournament, Bronze

- January 2011 - Senior Nationals Championships Rohtak, Silver in Chada Cup
- Feb 2010 - Senior Nationals Championship Guwahati, Bronze
- July 2008 - All India Major Ranking Tournament Mumbai, Women Singles & Doubles, Bronze
- Feb 2009 - Senior National Championship-Indore.Women's Doubles, Silver

=== Inter-National Level ===
- December 2015 - Qtr-finalist at the Bangladesh International Challenge
- November 2015 - Qtr-finalist at the Bahrain International Challenge
- August 2015 - Qualified for the World Championships to be held in Jakarta, Indonesia with career best World Ranking of 68
- April 2015 - Qualified for the Singapore Super Series
- January 2015 - Qtr-finalist at the Thailand International Challenge
- December 2014 - Tata International Challenge Mumbai, Bronze

December 2013 - Bangladesh International Challenge, Silver

- March 2011 - Runners-up at the Uganda International Series in doubles and quarterfinalist in the singles match
- Feb 2010 - Runners-up in singles at the Iran International Challenge
- Dec 2010 - Runners-Up in doubles at the Bahrain International Tournament
- April 2009 - Winner in both the Women Singles & Doubles events in the Yonex Kenya International, Nairobi, Kenya.
- March 2008 - Selected to represent India at the Croatian and Portuguese International
- 2007 - 32nd Yonex Hungarian International Badminton Championship. Women's Singles, Pre-quarter-finalists
- 2007 - Bank of Scotland Centenary International Badminton Championships, Women's Singles, Pre-quarter-finalists
- 2005 & 2009 - Winner of World Railways
- 2007 - Winner in the All India Major Ranking Tournament at Dehradun
- 2004 - Winner in the Asian Satellite Tournament in Pakistan
- 2002 - Bronze medallist in Junior Asian Badminton Championship, Kuala Lumpur
