= Prajakta Sawant =

Indian badminton player

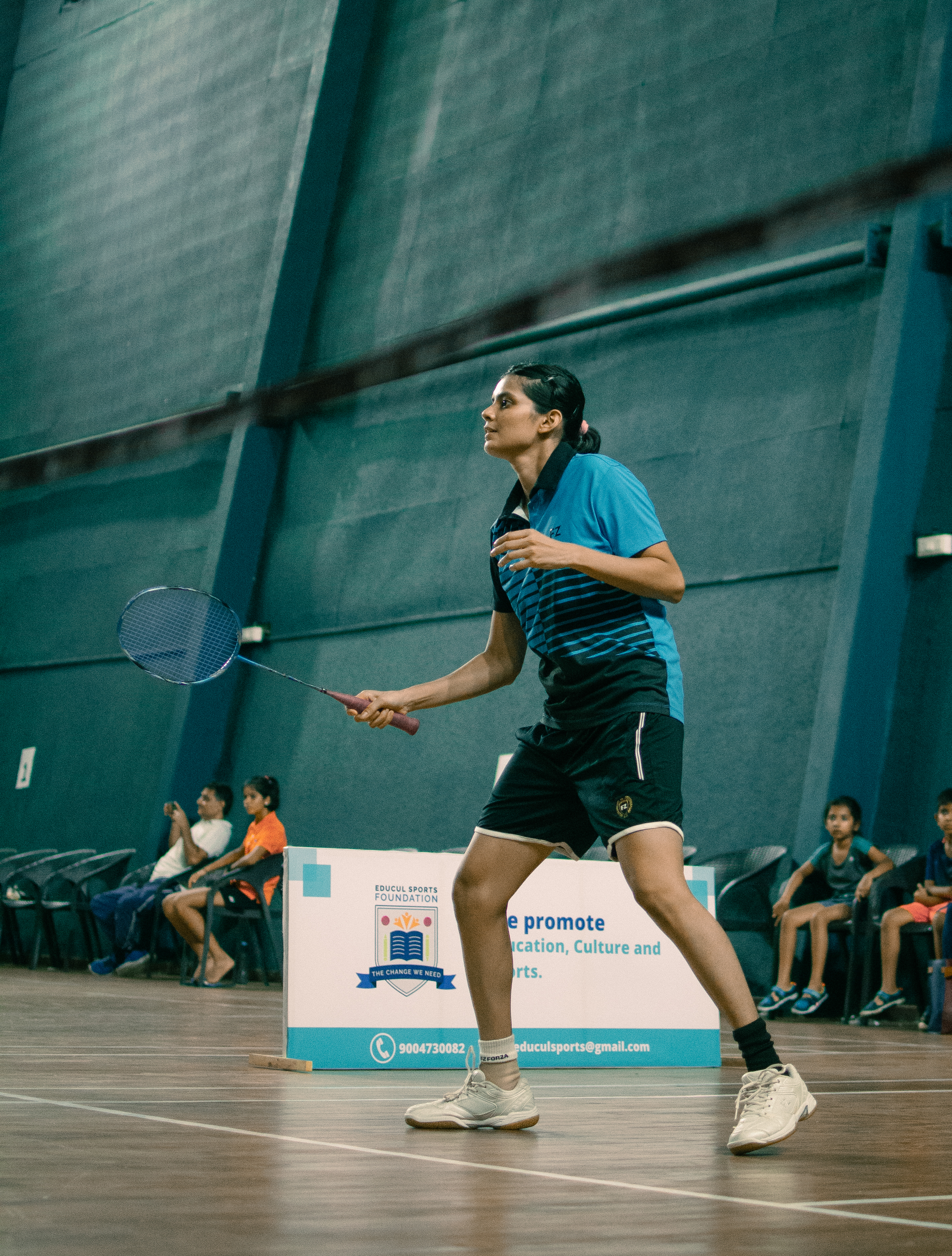
Prajakta Sawant in 2022

Prajakta Sawant (born 28 October 1992) is a badminton player from India. She was the national women's doubles champion in 2010 and 2011 and also won the mixed doubles title in 2010. In 2013, she won the Bangladesh International tournament partnered with Arathi Sara Sunil.

In 2007, at age 14, she made history by becoming the first Indian female to win a gold medal in the Asian Badminton Championship. She achieved this feat alongside Raj Kumar, as they won the Badminton Asia Championships U-16 mixed doubles title. In 2009, she once again made history by becoming the first Indian female to win a bronze medal in the same tournament, but this time in the U-19 mixed doubles category.

In 2010, when she participated, she was the youngest player on the badminton court. In 2010, Prajakta was selected to be a part of the Indian team for the Asian Games, and she was the youngest badminton player to participate in this prestigious event.

== Achievements ==
=== Asia Junior Championships ===
Mixed doubles
Year	Venue	Partner	Opponent	Score	Result
2009 Badminton Asia Junior Championships	Stadium Juara, Kuala Lumpur, Malaysia	(India) Pranav Chopra	(China) Lu Kai (China) Bao Yixin	12–21, 15–21	Bronze

=== BWF International Challenge/Series (8 titles, 6 runners-up) ===
Women's doubles
Year	Tournament	Partner	Opponent	Score	Result
2017	Egypt International	(India) Sanyogita Ghorpade	(Belarus) Anastasiya Cherniavskaya (Belarus) Alesia Zaitsava	17–21, 18–21	(silver) Runner-up
2017	Mauritius International	(India) Sanyogita Ghorpade	(Germany) Lisa Kaminski (Germany) Hannah Pohl	18–21, 20–22	(silver) Runner-up
2016	Mauritius International	(Malaysia) Lee Zhi Qing	(Zambia) Evelyn Siamupangila (Zambia) Ogar Siamupangila	21–7, 21–6	(gold) Winner
2014	India International Challenge	(India) Aparna Balan	(India) J. Meghana (India) K. Maneesha	21–13, 10–21, 21–13	(gold) Winner
2013	Bangladesh International	(India) Arathi Sara Sunil	(India) Dhanya Nair (India) Mohita Sahdev	22–20, 15–4 Retired	(gold) Winner
2013	Bahrain International Series	(India) Arathi Sara Sunil	(India) Aparna Balan (India) Sanyogita Ghorpade	18–21, 21–18, 21–16	(gold) Winner
2011	Swiss International	(India) Pradnya Gadre	(France) Laura Choinet (France) Audrey Fontaine	19–21, 21–10, 21–10	(gold) Winner
2011	Bulgarian International	(India) Pradnya Gadre	(England) Mariana Agathangelou (England) Heather Olver	21–18, 7–21, 10–21	(silver) Runner-up

Mixed doubles
Year	Tournament	Partner	Opponent	Score	Result
2017	Malaysia International	(Malaysia) Yogendran Khrishnan	(Japan) Hiroki Okamura (Japan) Naru Shinoya	10–21, 22–24	(silver) Runner-up
2017	Egypt International	(Malaysia) Yogendran Khrishnan	(Egypt) Ahmed Salah (Egypt) Menna Eltanany	21–15, 21–13	(gold) Winner
2017	Mauritius International	(Malaysia) Yogendran Khrishnan	(Germany) Jonathan Persson (Mauritius) Kate Foo Kune	21–7, 21–17	(gold) Winner
2016	Mauritius International	(Malaysia) Yogendran Khrishnan	(India) Satwiksairaj Rankireddy (India) K. Maneesha	19–21, 21–11, 17–21	(silver) Runner-up
2014	Sri Lanka International	(Malaysia) Vountus Indra Mawan	(India) Akshay Dewalkar (India) Pradnya Gadre	16–21, 18–21	(silver) Runner-up
2013	Bahrain International Challenge	(India) Sanave Thomas	(India) V. Diju (India) N. Siki Reddy	19–21, 21–14, 23–23 Retired	(gold) Winner

BWF International Challenge tournament
BWF International Series tournament
