= Elisabeth Baldauf =

Austrian badminton player (born 1990)

Personal information
- Born: 3 August 1990 (age 36) Bregenz, Austria
- Height: 1.75 m (5 ft 9 in)
- Weight: 62 kg (137 lb)

Sport
- Country: Austria
- Sport: Badminton
- Handedness: Right

Women's
- Highest ranking: 57 (WS) 21 Apr 2016; 122 (WD) 19 Jun 2014; 39 (XD) 14 Feb 2013
- BWF profile

Elisabeth Baldauf (born 3 August 1990) is an Austrian female badminton player. She represented her country at the 2016 Summer Olympics in Rio de Janeiro, Brazil.

== Achievements ==
=== BWF International Challenge/Series ===
Women's Singles
Year	Tournament	Opponent	Score	Result
2016	Giraldilla International	(Peru) Daniela Macias	21-11, 21–14	(gold) Winner
2015	Argentina International	(Brazil) Lohaynny Vicente	21–17, 14–6 Retired	(gold) Winner
2015	Santo Domingo Open	(Mexico) Haramara Gaitan	21–18, 12–21, 21–19	(gold) Winner
2015	Trinidad and Tobago International	(Italy) Jeanine Cicognini	16–21, 21–16, 21–10	(gold) Winner
2014	Santo Domingo Open	(Peru) Danica Nishimura	21–7, 21–9	(gold) Winner
2014	Mauritius International	(Italy) Jeanine Cicognini	18-21, 10–21	(silver) Runner-up
2014	Bahrain International	(India) Riya Pillai	18-21, 12–21	(silver) Runner-up

Mixed Doubles
Year	Tournament	Partner	Opponent	Score	Result
2016	Giraldilla International	(Austria) David Obernosterer	(United States) Bjorn Seguin (Mexico) Mariana Ugalde	21-12, 21–12	(gold) Winner
2016	Jamaica International	(Austria) David Obernosterer	(United States) Bjorn Seguin (Mexico) Mariana Ugalde	21-19, 18–21, 21–11	(gold) Winner
2016	Brazil International	(Austria) David Obernosterer	(Canada) Toby Ng (Canada) Alex Bruce	12-21, 15–21	(silver) Runner-up
2015	Brazil International	(Austria) David Obernosterer	(Brazil) Hugo Arthuso (Brazil) Fabiana Silva	15-21, 21–16, 19–21	(silver) Runner-up
2015	Argentina International	(Austria) David Obernosterer	(Brazil) Alex Yuwan Tjong (Brazil) Lohaynny Vicente	Retired	(gold) Winner
2015	Internacional Mexicano	(Austria) David Obernosterer	(Brazil) Alex Yuwan Tjong (Brazil) Luana Vicente	21-17, 21–17	(gold) Winner
2015	Santo Domingo Open	(Austria) David Obernosterer	(Peru) Mario Cuba (Peru) Katherine Winder	14–21, 21–16, 21–19	(gold) Winner
2015	Trinidad and Tobago International	(Austria) David Obernosterer	(Mexico) Lino Munoz (Mexico) Cynthia Gonzalez	21-15, 21–19	(gold) Winner
2014	Santo Domingo Open	(Austria) David Obernosterer	(Dominican Republic) Nelson Javier (Dominican Republic) Vibieca Beronica	21-17, 21–15	(gold) Winner
2014	Bahrain International	(Austria) David Obernosterer	(Bahrain) Heri Setiawan (Bahrain) Rehana Sunder	21-13, 21–14	(gold) Winner
2014	Portugal International	(Austria) Roman Zirnwald	(Denmark) Jeppe Ludvigsen (Denmark) Mai Surrow	21-19, 21–11	(gold) Winner
2012	Bulgaria Hebar Open	(Austria) Roman Zirnwald	(Bulgaria) Blagovest Kisyov (Bulgaria) Dimitria Popstoikova	21-14, 11–21, 21–19	(gold) Winner
2011	Banuinvest International	(Austria) Roman Zirnwald	(Republic of Ireland) Sam Magee (Republic of Ireland) Chloe Magee	12-21, 21–18, 18–21	(silver) Runner-up

BWF International Challenge tournament
BWF International Series tournament
BWF Future Series tournament
