= David Obernosterer =

Austrian badminton player (born 1989)

Personal information
- Nickname: Obi
- Born: David Obernosterer; 30 May 1989 (age 37) Egg, Austria
- Height: 1.83 m (6 ft 0 in)

Sport
- Country: Austria
- Sport: Badminton
- Handedness: Right

Men's singles
- Highest ranking: 54 (MS) 8 Jul 2016; 87 (MD) 3 Sep 2015; 46 (XD) 13 Sep 2012
- Current ranking: 68 (MS); 1365 (MD); 50 (XD) (4 Aug 2016)
- BWF profile

David Obernosterer (born 30 May 1989) is a male badminton player from Austria. He competed at the 2016 Summer Olympics in Rio de Janeiro, Brazil.

== Achievements ==
=== BWF International Challenge/Series ===
Men's singles
Year	Tournament	Opponent	Score	Result
2016	Jamaica International	(Portugal) Pedro Martins	19-21, 17–21	(silver) Runner-up
2015	Santo Domingo Open	(Austria) Luka Wraber	21–17, 21–17	(gold) Winner
2015	Iran Fajr International	(Czech Republic) Milan Ludík	21–13, 19–21, 21–17	(gold) Winner
2014	Santo Domingo Open	(Cuba) Osleni Guerrero	21–16, 16–21, 21–17	(gold) Winner
2014	Mauritius International	(Austria) Luka Wraber	21–9, 18–21, 23–25	(silver) Runner-up
2014	Croatian International	(Germany) Lukas Schmidt	14-21, 9-21	(silver) Runner-up
2012	Bulgarian International	(Lithuania) Kestutis Navickas	20–22, 21–15, 13–21	(silver) Runner-up
2012	Bulgarian Hebar Open	(Malaysia) Tan Chun Seang	21–14, 15–21, 10–21	(silver) Runner-up

Mixed doubles
Year	Venue	Partner	Opponent	Score	Result
2016	Giraldilla International	(Austria) Elisabeth Baldauf	(United States) Bjorn Seguin (Mexico) Mariana Ugalde	21-12, 21–12	(gold) Winner
2016	Jamaica International	(Austria) Elisabeth Baldauf	(United States) Bjorn Seguin (Mexico) Mariana Ugalde	21–19, 18–21, 21–11	(gold) Winner
2016	Brazil International	(Austria) Elisabeth Baldauf	(Canada) Toby Ng (Canada) Alex Bruce	12-21, 15–21	(silver) Runner-up
2015	Brazil International	(Austria) Elisabeth Baldauf	(Brazil) Hugo Arthuso (Brazil) Fabiana Silva	15–21, 21–16, 19–21	(silver) Runner-up
2015	Argentina International	(Austria) Elisabeth Baldauf	(Brazil) Alex Yuwan Tjong (Brazil) Lohaynny Vicente	Retired	(gold) Winner
2015	Internacional Mexicano	(Austria) Elisabeth Baldauf	(Brazil) Alex Yuwan Tjong (Brazil) Luana Vicente	21–17, 21–17	(gold) Winner
2015	Santo Domingo Open	(Austria) Elisabeth Baldauf	(Peru) Mario Cuba (Peru) Katherine Winder	14–21, 21–16, 21–19	(gold) Winner
2015	Trinidad and Tobago International	(Austria) Elisabeth Baldauf	(Mexico) Lino Munoz (Mexico) Cynthia Gonzalez	21–15, 21–19	(gold) Winner
2014	Bahrain International	(Austria) Elisabeth Baldauf	(Bahrain) Heri Setiawan (Bahrain) Rehana Sunder	21-13, 21–14	(gold) Winner
2014	Santo Domingo Open	(Austria) Elisabeth Baldauf	(Dominican Republic) Nelson Javier (Dominican Republic) Vibieca Beronica	21-17, 21–15	(gold) Winner

Commonwealth Youth Games tournament
BWF International Series tournament
BWF Future Series tournament
