= 2019 BWF season =

Badminton World Federation circuit

Details
- Duration: 8 January – 22 December
- Tournaments: 143
- Categories: Grade 1: 2 (Individuals, Teams); Grade 2 – BWF World Tour Finals: 1 Grade 2 – Super 1000: 3 Grade 2 – Super 750: 5 Grade 2 – Super 500: 7 Grade 2 – Super 300: 11; Grade 2 – Super 100: 10; Grade 3 – International Challenge: 28; Grade 3 – International Series: 38; Grade 3 – Future Series: 26; Continental Championships: 9

Achievements (singles)

Awards
- Player of the year: (Japan) Kento Momota (Male) (China) Huang Yaqiong (Female)

The 2019 BWF season was the overall badminton circuit organized by the Badminton World Federation (BWF) for the 2019 badminton season to publish and promote the sport. The world badminton tournament in 2019 consisted of:
1. BWF Tournaments (Grade 1; Major Events)

- BWF World Mixed Team Championships (Sudirman Cup)
- BWF World Championships

2. BWF World Tour (Grade 2)

- Level 1 (BWF World Tour Finals)
- Level 2 (BWF World Tour Super 1000)
- Level 3 (BWF World Tour Super 750)
- Level 4 (BWF World Tour Super 500)
- Level 5 (BWF World Tour Super 300)
- Level 6 (BWF Tour Super 100)

3. Continental Circuit (Grade 3) BWF Open Tournaments: BWF International Challenge, BWF International Series, and BWF Future Series.

The Sudirman Cup were teams event. The others – Super 1000, Super 750, Super 500, Super 300, Super 100, International Challenge, International Series, and Future Series are all individual tournaments. The higher the level of tournament, the larger the prize money and the more ranking points available.

The 2019 BWF season calendar comprises these six levels of BWF tournaments.

== Schedule ==
This is the complete schedule of events on the 2019 calendar, with the Champions and Runners-up documented.

Key

World Championships
World Tour Finals
Super 1000
Super 750
Super 500
Super 300
Super 100
International Challenge
International Series
Future Series
Team events

=== January ===
Week commencing	Tournament	Champions	Runners-up
7 January	Thailand Masters (Draw): Host: Bangkok, Thailand; Venue: Indoor Stadium Huamark; Level: Super 300; Prize: $150,000; Format: 32MS/32WS/32MD/32WD/32XD	(Singapore) Loh Kean Yew	(China) Lin Dan
7 January	Thailand Masters (Draw): Host: Bangkok, Thailand; Venue: Indoor Stadium Huamark; Level: Super 300; Prize: $150,000; Format: 32MS/32WS/32MD/32WD/32XD	Score: 21–19, 21–18	
7 January	Thailand Masters (Draw): Host: Bangkok, Thailand; Venue: Indoor Stadium Huamark; Level: Super 300; Prize: $150,000; Format: 32MS/32WS/32MD/32WD/32XD	(Indonesia) Fitriani	(Thailand) Busanan Ongbamrungphan
7 January	Thailand Masters (Draw): Host: Bangkok, Thailand; Venue: Indoor Stadium Huamark; Level: Super 300; Prize: $150,000; Format: 32MS/32WS/32MD/32WD/32XD	Score: 21–12, 21–14	
7 January	Thailand Masters (Draw): Host: Bangkok, Thailand; Venue: Indoor Stadium Huamark; Level: Super 300; Prize: $150,000; Format: 32MS/32WS/32MD/32WD/32XD	(Malaysia) Goh V Shem (Malaysia) Tan Wee Kiong	(Chinese Taipei) Lu Ching-yao (Chinese Taipei) Yang Po-han
7 January	Thailand Masters (Draw): Host: Bangkok, Thailand; Venue: Indoor Stadium Huamark; Level: Super 300; Prize: $150,000; Format: 32MS/32WS/32MD/32WD/32XD	Score: 21–13, 21–17	
7 January	Thailand Masters (Draw): Host: Bangkok, Thailand; Venue: Indoor Stadium Huamark; Level: Super 300; Prize: $150,000; Format: 32MS/32WS/32MD/32WD/32XD	(Thailand) Puttita Supajirakul (Thailand) Sapsiree Taerattanachai	(China) Li Wenmei (China) Zheng Yu
7 January	Thailand Masters (Draw): Host: Bangkok, Thailand; Venue: Indoor Stadium Huamark; Level: Super 300; Prize: $150,000; Format: 32MS/32WS/32MD/32WD/32XD	Score: 15–21, 21–15, 21–10	
7 January	Thailand Masters (Draw): Host: Bangkok, Thailand; Venue: Indoor Stadium Huamark; Level: Super 300; Prize: $150,000; Format: 32MS/32WS/32MD/32WD/32XD	(Malaysia) Chan Peng Soon (Malaysia) Goh Liu Ying	(Thailand) Dechapol Puavaranukroh (Thailand) Sapsiree Taerattanachai
7 January	Thailand Masters (Draw): Host: Bangkok, Thailand; Venue: Indoor Stadium Huamark; Level: Super 300; Prize: $150,000; Format: 32MS/32WS/32MD/32WD/32XD	Score: 21–16, 21–15	
7 January	Estonian International: Host: Tallinn, Estonia; Venue: Kalev Sports Hall; Level: International Series; Prize: $10,000; Format: 32MS/32WS/32MD/32WD/32XD	(France) Arnaud Merklé	(Netherlands) Joran Kweekel
7 January	Estonian International: Host: Tallinn, Estonia; Venue: Kalev Sports Hall; Level: International Series; Prize: $10,000; Format: 32MS/32WS/32MD/32WD/32XD	Score: 21–8, 21–16	
7 January	Estonian International: Host: Tallinn, Estonia; Venue: Kalev Sports Hall; Level: International Series; Prize: $10,000; Format: 32MS/32WS/32MD/32WD/32XD	(Japan) Asuka Takahashi	(Japan) Hirari Mizui
7 January	Estonian International: Host: Tallinn, Estonia; Venue: Kalev Sports Hall; Level: International Series; Prize: $10,000; Format: 32MS/32WS/32MD/32WD/32XD	Score: 8–21, 21–17, 21–11	
7 January	Estonian International: Host: Tallinn, Estonia; Venue: Kalev Sports Hall; Level: International Series; Prize: $10,000; Format: 32MS/32WS/32MD/32WD/32XD	(England) Peter Briggs (England) Gregory Mairs	(Singapore) Danny Bawa Chrisnanta (Singapore) Loh Kean Hean
7 January	Estonian International: Host: Tallinn, Estonia; Venue: Kalev Sports Hall; Level: International Series; Prize: $10,000; Format: 32MS/32WS/32MD/32WD/32XD	Score: 22–20, 21–18	
7 January	Estonian International: Host: Tallinn, Estonia; Venue: Kalev Sports Hall; Level: International Series; Prize: $10,000; Format: 32MS/32WS/32MD/32WD/32XD	(Denmark) Julie Finne-Ipsen (Denmark) Mai Surrow	(Russia) Anastasiia Akchurina (Russia) Olga Morozova
7 January	Estonian International: Host: Tallinn, Estonia; Venue: Kalev Sports Hall; Level: International Series; Prize: $10,000; Format: 32MS/32WS/32MD/32WD/32XD	Score: 21–12, 17–21, 21–14	
7 January	Estonian International: Host: Tallinn, Estonia; Venue: Kalev Sports Hall; Level: International Series; Prize: $10,000; Format: 32MS/32WS/32MD/32WD/32XD	(Singapore) Danny Bawa Chrisnanta (Singapore) Tan Wei Han	(England) Gregory Mairs (England) Victoria Williams
7 January	Estonian International: Host: Tallinn, Estonia; Venue: Kalev Sports Hall; Level: International Series; Prize: $10,000; Format: 32MS/32WS/32MD/32WD/32XD	Score: 21–18, 14–21, 21–15	
14 January	Malaysia Masters (Draw): Host: Kuala Lumpur, Malaysia; Venue: Axiata Arena; Level: Super 500; Prize: $350,000; Format: 32MS/32WS/32MD/32WD/32XD	(South Korea) Son Wan-ho	(China) Chen Long
14 January	Malaysia Masters (Draw): Host: Kuala Lumpur, Malaysia; Venue: Axiata Arena; Level: Super 500; Prize: $350,000; Format: 32MS/32WS/32MD/32WD/32XD	Score: 21–17, 21–19	
14 January	Malaysia Masters (Draw): Host: Kuala Lumpur, Malaysia; Venue: Axiata Arena; Level: Super 500; Prize: $350,000; Format: 32MS/32WS/32MD/32WD/32XD	(Thailand) Ratchanok Intanon	(Spain) Carolina Marín
14 January	Malaysia Masters (Draw): Host: Kuala Lumpur, Malaysia; Venue: Axiata Arena; Level: Super 500; Prize: $350,000; Format: 32MS/32WS/32MD/32WD/32XD	Score: 21–9, 22–20	
14 January	Malaysia Masters (Draw): Host: Kuala Lumpur, Malaysia; Venue: Axiata Arena; Level: Super 500; Prize: $350,000; Format: 32MS/32WS/32MD/32WD/32XD	(Indonesia) Marcus Fernaldi Gideon (Indonesia) Kevin Sanjaya Sukamuljo	(Malaysia) Ong Yew Sin (Malaysia) Teo Ee Yi
14 January	Malaysia Masters (Draw): Host: Kuala Lumpur, Malaysia; Venue: Axiata Arena; Level: Super 500; Prize: $350,000; Format: 32MS/32WS/32MD/32WD/32XD	Score: 21–15, 21–16	
14 January	Malaysia Masters (Draw): Host: Kuala Lumpur, Malaysia; Venue: Axiata Arena; Level: Super 500; Prize: $350,000; Format: 32MS/32WS/32MD/32WD/32XD	(Japan) Yuki Fukushima (Japan) Sayaka Hirota	(Indonesia) Greysia Polii (Indonesia) Apriyani Rahayu
14 January	Malaysia Masters (Draw): Host: Kuala Lumpur, Malaysia; Venue: Axiata Arena; Level: Super 500; Prize: $350,000; Format: 32MS/32WS/32MD/32WD/32XD	Score: 18–21, 21–16, 21–16	
14 January	Malaysia Masters (Draw): Host: Kuala Lumpur, Malaysia; Venue: Axiata Arena; Level: Super 500; Prize: $350,000; Format: 32MS/32WS/32MD/32WD/32XD	(Japan) Yuta Watanabe (Japan) Arisa Higashino	(Thailand) Dechapol Puavaranukroh (Thailand) Sapsiree Taerattanachai
14 January	Malaysia Masters (Draw): Host: Kuala Lumpur, Malaysia; Venue: Axiata Arena; Level: Super 500; Prize: $350,000; Format: 32MS/32WS/32MD/32WD/32XD	Score: 21–18, 21–18	
14 January	Swedish Open: Host: Lund, Sweden; Venue: Sparbanken Skåne Arena; Level: International Series; Prize: $10,000; Format: 32MS/32WS/32MD/32WD/32XD	(Japan) Minoru Koga	(Singapore) Loh Kean Yew
14 January	Swedish Open: Host: Lund, Sweden; Venue: Sparbanken Skåne Arena; Level: International Series; Prize: $10,000; Format: 32MS/32WS/32MD/32WD/32XD	Score: 21–11, 21–15	
14 January	Swedish Open: Host: Lund, Sweden; Venue: Sparbanken Skåne Arena; Level: International Series; Prize: $10,000; Format: 32MS/32WS/32MD/32WD/32XD	(Japan) Mako Urushizaki	(Japan) Asuka Takahashi
14 January	Swedish Open: Host: Lund, Sweden; Venue: Sparbanken Skåne Arena; Level: International Series; Prize: $10,000; Format: 32MS/32WS/32MD/32WD/32XD	Score: 23–21, 21–19	
14 January	Swedish Open: Host: Lund, Sweden; Venue: Sparbanken Skåne Arena; Level: International Series; Prize: $10,000; Format: 32MS/32WS/32MD/32WD/32XD	(Denmark) Mathias Bay-Smidt (Denmark) Lasse Mølhede	(France) Bastian Kersaudy (France) Julien Maio
14 January	Swedish Open: Host: Lund, Sweden; Venue: Sparbanken Skåne Arena; Level: International Series; Prize: $10,000; Format: 32MS/32WS/32MD/32WD/32XD	Score: 21–12, 21–15	
14 January	Swedish Open: Host: Lund, Sweden; Venue: Sparbanken Skåne Arena; Level: International Series; Prize: $10,000; Format: 32MS/32WS/32MD/32WD/32XD	(Denmark) Amalie Magelund (Denmark) Freja Ravn	(Sweden) Emma Karlsson (Sweden) Johanna Magnusson
14 January	Swedish Open: Host: Lund, Sweden; Venue: Sparbanken Skåne Arena; Level: International Series; Prize: $10,000; Format: 32MS/32WS/32MD/32WD/32XD	Score: 21–15, 12–21, 21–17	
14 January	Swedish Open: Host: Lund, Sweden; Venue: Sparbanken Skåne Arena; Level: International Series; Prize: $10,000; Format: 32MS/32WS/32MD/32WD/32XD	(Singapore) Danny Bawa Chrisnanta (Singapore) Tan Wei Han	(Denmark) Mikkel Mikkelsen (Denmark) Mai Surrow
14 January	Swedish Open: Host: Lund, Sweden; Venue: Sparbanken Skåne Arena; Level: International Series; Prize: $10,000; Format: 32MS/32WS/32MD/32WD/32XD	Score: 21–14, 21–16	
21 January	Indonesia Masters (Draw): Host: Jakarta, Indonesia; Venue: Istora Senayan; Level: Super 500; Prize: $350,000; Format: 32MS/32WS/32MD/32WD/32XD	(Denmark) Anders Antonsen	(Japan) Kento Momota
21 January	Indonesia Masters (Draw): Host: Jakarta, Indonesia; Venue: Istora Senayan; Level: Super 500; Prize: $350,000; Format: 32MS/32WS/32MD/32WD/32XD	Score: 21–16, 14–21, 21–16	
21 January	Indonesia Masters (Draw): Host: Jakarta, Indonesia; Venue: Istora Senayan; Level: Super 500; Prize: $350,000; Format: 32MS/32WS/32MD/32WD/32XD	(India) Saina Nehwal	(Spain) Carolina Marín
21 January	Indonesia Masters (Draw): Host: Jakarta, Indonesia; Venue: Istora Senayan; Level: Super 500; Prize: $350,000; Format: 32MS/32WS/32MD/32WD/32XD	Score: 4–10 Retired	
21 January	Indonesia Masters (Draw): Host: Jakarta, Indonesia; Venue: Istora Senayan; Level: Super 500; Prize: $350,000; Format: 32MS/32WS/32MD/32WD/32XD	(Indonesia) Marcus Fernaldi Gideon (Indonesia) Kevin Sanjaya Sukamuljo	(Indonesia) Mohammad Ahsan (Indonesia) Hendra Setiawan
21 January	Indonesia Masters (Draw): Host: Jakarta, Indonesia; Venue: Istora Senayan; Level: Super 500; Prize: $350,000; Format: 32MS/32WS/32MD/32WD/32XD	Score: 21–17, 21–11	
21 January	Indonesia Masters (Draw): Host: Jakarta, Indonesia; Venue: Istora Senayan; Level: Super 500; Prize: $350,000; Format: 32MS/32WS/32MD/32WD/32XD	(Japan) Misaki Matsutomo (Japan) Ayaka Takahashi	(South Korea) Kim So-yeong (South Korea) Kong Hee-yong
21 January	Indonesia Masters (Draw): Host: Jakarta, Indonesia; Venue: Istora Senayan; Level: Super 500; Prize: $350,000; Format: 32MS/32WS/32MD/32WD/32XD	Score: 21–19, 21–15	
21 January	Indonesia Masters (Draw): Host: Jakarta, Indonesia; Venue: Istora Senayan; Level: Super 500; Prize: $350,000; Format: 32MS/32WS/32MD/32WD/32XD	(China) Zheng Siwei (China) Huang Yaqiong	(Indonesia) Tontowi Ahmad (Indonesia) Liliyana Natsir
21 January	Indonesia Masters (Draw): Host: Jakarta, Indonesia; Venue: Istora Senayan; Level: Super 500; Prize: $350,000; Format: 32MS/32WS/32MD/32WD/32XD	Score: 19–21, 21–19, 21–16	
21 January	Iceland International: Host: Reykjavík, Iceland; Venue: TBR – Badminton Hall; Level: Future Series; Format: 32MS/32WS/32MD/16WD/32XD	(Denmark) Mikkel Enghøj	(Finland) Kasper Lehikoinen
21 January	Iceland International: Host: Reykjavík, Iceland; Venue: TBR – Badminton Hall; Level: Future Series; Format: 32MS/32WS/32MD/16WD/32XD	Score: 21–19, 21–17	
21 January	Iceland International: Host: Reykjavík, Iceland; Venue: TBR – Badminton Hall; Level: Future Series; Format: 32MS/32WS/32MD/16WD/32XD	(Switzerland) Ayla Huser	(England) Abigail Holden
21 January	Iceland International: Host: Reykjavík, Iceland; Venue: TBR – Badminton Hall; Level: Future Series; Format: 32MS/32WS/32MD/16WD/32XD	Score: 16–21, 24–22, 21–6	
21 January	Iceland International: Host: Reykjavík, Iceland; Venue: TBR – Badminton Hall; Level: Future Series; Format: 32MS/32WS/32MD/16WD/32XD	(Portugal) Bruno Carvalho (Portugal) Tomas Nero	(Norway) Mads Marum (Norway) Mattias Xu
21 January	Iceland International: Host: Reykjavík, Iceland; Venue: TBR – Badminton Hall; Level: Future Series; Format: 32MS/32WS/32MD/16WD/32XD	Score: 21–13, 21–11	
21 January	Iceland International: Host: Reykjavík, Iceland; Venue: TBR – Badminton Hall; Level: Future Series; Format: 32MS/32WS/32MD/16WD/32XD	(England) Abigail Holden (England) Sian Kelly	(Iceland) Sigridur Arnadottir (Iceland) Margrét Jóhannsdóttir
21 January	Iceland International: Host: Reykjavík, Iceland; Venue: TBR – Badminton Hall; Level: Future Series; Format: 32MS/32WS/32MD/16WD/32XD	Score: 23–21, 21–18	
21 January	Iceland International: Host: Reykjavík, Iceland; Venue: TBR – Badminton Hall; Level: Future Series; Format: 32MS/32WS/32MD/16WD/32XD	(Iceland) Kristofer Darri Finnsson (Iceland) Margrét Jóhannsdóttir	(England) Ethan Van Leeuwen (England) Annie Lado
21 January	Iceland International: Host: Reykjavík, Iceland; Venue: TBR – Badminton Hall; Level: Future Series; Format: 32MS/32WS/32MD/16WD/32XD	Score: 21–13, 21–18	

=== February ===
Week commencing	Tournament	Champions	Runners-up
4 February	Iran Fajr International: Host: Tehran, Iran; Venue: Enghelab Sport Complex; Level: International Challenge; Prize: $25,000; Format: 64MS/32WS/32MD/32WD	(Thailand) Kunlavut Vitidsarn	(China) Li Shifeng
4 February	Iran Fajr International: Host: Tehran, Iran; Venue: Enghelab Sport Complex; Level: International Challenge; Prize: $25,000; Format: 64MS/32WS/32MD/32WD	Score: 21–18, 21–17	
4 February	Iran Fajr International: Host: Tehran, Iran; Venue: Enghelab Sport Complex; Level: International Challenge; Prize: $25,000; Format: 64MS/32WS/32MD/32WD	(Thailand) Supanida Katethong	(Indonesia) Choirunnisa
4 February	Iran Fajr International: Host: Tehran, Iran; Venue: Enghelab Sport Complex; Level: International Challenge; Prize: $25,000; Format: 64MS/32WS/32MD/32WD	Score: 21–16, 21–13	
4 February	Iran Fajr International: Host: Tehran, Iran; Venue: Enghelab Sport Complex; Level: International Challenge; Prize: $25,000; Format: 64MS/32WS/32MD/32WD	(Indonesia) Adnan Maulana (Indonesia) Ghifari Anandaffa Prihardika	(Indonesia) Pramudya Kusumawardana (Indonesia) Yeremia Rambitan
4 February	Iran Fajr International: Host: Tehran, Iran; Venue: Enghelab Sport Complex; Level: International Challenge; Prize: $25,000; Format: 64MS/32WS/32MD/32WD	Score: 21–18, 21–13	
4 February	Iran Fajr International: Host: Tehran, Iran; Venue: Enghelab Sport Complex; Level: International Challenge; Prize: $25,000; Format: 64MS/32WS/32MD/32WD	(Indonesia) Nita Violina Marwah (Indonesia) Putri Syaikah	(Turkey) Bengisu Erçetin (Turkey) Nazlıcan İnci
4 February	Iran Fajr International: Host: Tehran, Iran; Venue: Enghelab Sport Complex; Level: International Challenge; Prize: $25,000; Format: 64MS/32WS/32MD/32WD	Score: 21–17, 21–18	
11 February	Oceania Badminton Championships (Draw): Host: Melbourne, Australia; Venue: Melbourne Sports and Aquatic Centre; Level: Continental Championships; Format: 64MS/32WS/32MD/32WD/32XD	(New Zealand) Oscar Guo	(French Polynesia) Rémi Rossi
11 February	Oceania Badminton Championships (Draw): Host: Melbourne, Australia; Venue: Melbourne Sports and Aquatic Centre; Level: Continental Championships; Format: 64MS/32WS/32MD/32WD/32XD	Score: 24–22, 20–22, 21–15	
11 February	Oceania Badminton Championships (Draw): Host: Melbourne, Australia; Venue: Melbourne Sports and Aquatic Centre; Level: Continental Championships; Format: 64MS/32WS/32MD/32WD/32XD	(Australia) Chen Hsuan-yu	(Australia) Jiang Yingzi
11 February	Oceania Badminton Championships (Draw): Host: Melbourne, Australia; Venue: Melbourne Sports and Aquatic Centre; Level: Continental Championships; Format: 64MS/32WS/32MD/32WD/32XD	Score: 17–21, 21–16, 23–21	
11 February	Oceania Badminton Championships (Draw): Host: Melbourne, Australia; Venue: Melbourne Sports and Aquatic Centre; Level: Continental Championships; Format: 64MS/32WS/32MD/32WD/32XD	(Australia) Sawan Serasinghe (Australia) Eric Vuong	(Australia) Simon Leung (Australia) Mitchell Wheller
11 February	Oceania Badminton Championships (Draw): Host: Melbourne, Australia; Venue: Melbourne Sports and Aquatic Centre; Level: Continental Championships; Format: 64MS/32WS/32MD/32WD/32XD	Score: 21–17, 21–10	
11 February	Oceania Badminton Championships (Draw): Host: Melbourne, Australia; Venue: Melbourne Sports and Aquatic Centre; Level: Continental Championships; Format: 64MS/32WS/32MD/32WD/32XD	(Australia) Setyana Mapasa (Australia) Gronya Somerville	(Australia) Jiang Yingzi (Australia) Louisa Ma
11 February	Oceania Badminton Championships (Draw): Host: Melbourne, Australia; Venue: Melbourne Sports and Aquatic Centre; Level: Continental Championships; Format: 64MS/32WS/32MD/32WD/32XD	Score: 21–10, 21–9	
11 February	Oceania Badminton Championships (Draw): Host: Melbourne, Australia; Venue: Melbourne Sports and Aquatic Centre; Level: Continental Championships; Format: 64MS/32WS/32MD/32WD/32XD	(Australia) Simon Leung (Australia) Gronya Somerville	(Australia) Sawan Serasinghe (Australia) Khoo Lee Yen
11 February	Oceania Badminton Championships (Draw): Host: Melbourne, Australia; Venue: Melbourne Sports and Aquatic Centre; Level: Continental Championships; Format: 64MS/32WS/32MD/32WD/32XD	Score: 21–18, 21–15	
11 February	European Mixed Team Badminton Championships (Draw): Host: Copenhagen, Denmark; Venue: Frederiksberghallen; Level: Continental Team Championships; Format: 8 teams (Round robin)	Denmark	Germany
11 February	European Mixed Team Badminton Championships (Draw): Host: Copenhagen, Denmark; Venue: Frederiksberghallen; Level: Continental Team Championships; Format: 8 teams (Round robin)	Mathias Christiansen / Christinna Pedersen; Anders Antonsen; Line Kjærsfeldt; Kim Astrup / Anders Skaarup Rasmussen; Maiken Fruergaard / Christinna Pedersen	Isabel Herttrich / Mark Lamsfuß; Max Weißkirchen; Yvonne Li; Mark Lamsfuß / Marvin Emil Seidel; Linda Efler / Isabel Herttrich
11 February	European Mixed Team Badminton Championships (Draw): Host: Copenhagen, Denmark; Venue: Frederiksberghallen; Level: Continental Team Championships; Format: 8 teams (Round robin)	Score: 3–0	
11 February	Pan Am Mixed Team Badminton Championships (Draw): Host: Lima, Peru; Venue: Centro de Alto Rendimiento La Videna; Level: Continental Team Championships; Format: 11 teams (Round robin)	Canada	United States
11 February	Pan Am Mixed Team Badminton Championships (Draw): Host: Lima, Peru; Venue: Centro de Alto Rendimiento La Videna; Level: Continental Team Championships; Format: 11 teams (Round robin)	Joshua Hurlburt-Yu / Josephine Wu; Brittney Tam; Brian Yang; Catherine Choi / Talia Ng; Nyl Yakura / Duncan Yao	Phillip Chew / Breanna Chi; Natalie Chi; Andrew Zhang; Kuei-Ya Chen / Jennie Gai; Phillip Chew / Ryan Chew
11 February	Pan Am Mixed Team Badminton Championships (Draw): Host: Lima, Peru; Venue: Centro de Alto Rendimiento La Videna; Level: Continental Team Championships; Format: 11 teams (Round robin)	Score: 3–0	
11 February	Oceania Mixed Team Badminton Championships (Draw): Host: Melbourne, Australia; Venue: Melbourne Sports and Aquatic Centre; Level: Continental Team Championships; Format: 7 Teams (Round robin)	Australia	New Zealand
11 February	Oceania Mixed Team Badminton Championships (Draw): Host: Melbourne, Australia; Venue: Melbourne Sports and Aquatic Centre; Level: Continental Team Championships; Format: 7 Teams (Round robin)	Ann-Louise Slee; Anthony Joe; Ashwant Gobinathan; Chen Hsuan-yu; Eric Vuong; Gronya Somerville; Jennifer Tam; Louisa Ma; Matthew Chau; Mitchell Wheller; Setyana Mapasa; Simon Leung	Abhinav Manota; Alyssa Tagle; Anona Pak; Dacmen Vong; Erena Calder-Hawkins; Justine Villegas; Jonathan Curtis; Maika Philips; Oliver Leydon-Davis; Oscar Guo; Sally Fu
11 February	Oceania Mixed Team Badminton Championships (Draw): Host: Melbourne, Australia; Venue: Melbourne Sports and Aquatic Centre; Level: Continental Team Championships; Format: 7 Teams (Round robin)	Score: Round robin	
18 February	Spain Masters (Draw): Host: Barcelona, Spain; Venue: Pavelló de la Vall d'Hebron; Level: Super 300; Prize: $150,000; Format: 32MS/32WS/32MD/32WD/32XD	(Denmark) Viktor Axelsen	(Denmark) Anders Antonsen
18 February	Spain Masters (Draw): Host: Barcelona, Spain; Venue: Pavelló de la Vall d'Hebron; Level: Super 300; Prize: $150,000; Format: 32MS/32WS/32MD/32WD/32XD	Score: 21–14, 21–11	
18 February	Spain Masters (Draw): Host: Barcelona, Spain; Venue: Pavelló de la Vall d'Hebron; Level: Super 300; Prize: $150,000; Format: 32MS/32WS/32MD/32WD/32XD	(Denmark) Mia Blichfeldt	(Denmark) Line Kjærsfeldt
18 February	Spain Masters (Draw): Host: Barcelona, Spain; Venue: Pavelló de la Vall d'Hebron; Level: Super 300; Prize: $150,000; Format: 32MS/32WS/32MD/32WD/32XD	Score: 21–14, 21–14	
18 February	Spain Masters (Draw): Host: Barcelona, Spain; Venue: Pavelló de la Vall d'Hebron; Level: Super 300; Prize: $150,000; Format: 32MS/32WS/32MD/32WD/32XD	(Chinese Taipei) Lee Yang (Chinese Taipei) Wang Chi-lin	(South Korea) Kim Won-ho (South Korea) Seo Seung-jae
18 February	Spain Masters (Draw): Host: Barcelona, Spain; Venue: Pavelló de la Vall d'Hebron; Level: Super 300; Prize: $150,000; Format: 32MS/32WS/32MD/32WD/32XD	Score: 21–8, 23–21	
18 February	Spain Masters (Draw): Host: Barcelona, Spain; Venue: Pavelló de la Vall d'Hebron; Level: Super 300; Prize: $150,000; Format: 32MS/32WS/32MD/32WD/32XD	(South Korea) Kim So-yeong (South Korea) Kong Hee-yong	(Japan) Nami Matsuyama (Japan) Chiharu Shida
18 February	Spain Masters (Draw): Host: Barcelona, Spain; Venue: Pavelló de la Vall d'Hebron; Level: Super 300; Prize: $150,000; Format: 32MS/32WS/32MD/32WD/32XD	Score: 23–21, 15–21, 21–17	
18 February	Spain Masters (Draw): Host: Barcelona, Spain; Venue: Pavelló de la Vall d'Hebron; Level: Super 300; Prize: $150,000; Format: 32MS/32WS/32MD/32WD/32XD	(South Korea) Seo Seung-jae (South Korea) Chae Yoo-jung	(Chinese Taipei) Wang Chi-lin (Chinese Taipei) Cheng Chi-ya
18 February	Spain Masters (Draw): Host: Barcelona, Spain; Venue: Pavelló de la Vall d'Hebron; Level: Super 300; Prize: $150,000; Format: 32MS/32WS/32MD/32WD/32XD	Score: 21–18, 21–15	
18 February	Austrian Open: Host: Vienna, Austria; Venue: Wiener Stadthalle; Level: International Challenge; Prize: $25,000; Format: 32MS/32WS/32MD/32WD/32XD	(Netherlands) Mark Caljouw	(China) Li Shifeng
18 February	Austrian Open: Host: Vienna, Austria; Venue: Wiener Stadthalle; Level: International Challenge; Prize: $25,000; Format: 32MS/32WS/32MD/32WD/32XD	Score: 8–21, 23–21, 21–9	
18 February	Austrian Open: Host: Vienna, Austria; Venue: Wiener Stadthalle; Level: International Challenge; Prize: $25,000; Format: 32MS/32WS/32MD/32WD/32XD	(China) Wang Zhiyi	(Thailand) Porntip Buranaprasertsuk
18 February	Austrian Open: Host: Vienna, Austria; Venue: Wiener Stadthalle; Level: International Challenge; Prize: $25,000; Format: 32MS/32WS/32MD/32WD/32XD	Score: 21–18, 21–10	
18 February	Austrian Open: Host: Vienna, Austria; Venue: Wiener Stadthalle; Level: International Challenge; Prize: $25,000; Format: 32MS/32WS/32MD/32WD/32XD	(China) Guo Xinwa (China) Liu Shiwen	(Denmark) Joel Eipe (Denmark) Rasmus Kjær
18 February	Austrian Open: Host: Vienna, Austria; Venue: Wiener Stadthalle; Level: International Challenge; Prize: $25,000; Format: 32MS/32WS/32MD/32WD/32XD	Score: 21–15, 20–22, 21–16	
18 February	Austrian Open: Host: Vienna, Austria; Venue: Wiener Stadthalle; Level: International Challenge; Prize: $25,000; Format: 32MS/32WS/32MD/32WD/32XD	(China) Liu Xuanxuan (China) Xia Yuting	(Russia) Anastasiia Akchurina (Russia) Olga Morozova
18 February	Austrian Open: Host: Vienna, Austria; Venue: Wiener Stadthalle; Level: International Challenge; Prize: $25,000; Format: 32MS/32WS/32MD/32WD/32XD	Score: 21–17, 21–15	
18 February	Austrian Open: Host: Vienna, Austria; Venue: Wiener Stadthalle; Level: International Challenge; Prize: $25,000; Format: 32MS/32WS/32MD/32WD/32XD	(Netherlands) Robin Tabeling (Netherlands) Selena Piek	(Singapore) Danny Bawa Chrisnanta (Singapore) Tan Wei Han
18 February	Austrian Open: Host: Vienna, Austria; Venue: Wiener Stadthalle; Level: International Challenge; Prize: $25,000; Format: 32MS/32WS/32MD/32WD/32XD	Score: 19–21, 21–16, 21–12	
18 February	Lao International: Host: Vientiane, Laos; Venue: Settha Badminton Club; Level: International Series; Prize: $10,000; Format: 64MS/32WS/32MD/32WD/32XD	(Japan) Kodai Naraoka	(Japan) Minoru Koga
18 February	Lao International: Host: Vientiane, Laos; Venue: Settha Badminton Club; Level: International Series; Prize: $10,000; Format: 64MS/32WS/32MD/32WD/32XD	Score: 22–20, 22–20	
18 February	Lao International: Host: Vientiane, Laos; Venue: Settha Badminton Club; Level: International Series; Prize: $10,000; Format: 64MS/32WS/32MD/32WD/32XD	(Japan) Natsuki Oie	(Thailand) Phittayaporn Chaiwan
18 February	Lao International: Host: Vientiane, Laos; Venue: Settha Badminton Club; Level: International Series; Prize: $10,000; Format: 64MS/32WS/32MD/32WD/32XD	Score: 22–20, 23–21	
18 February	Lao International: Host: Vientiane, Laos; Venue: Settha Badminton Club; Level: International Series; Prize: $10,000; Format: 64MS/32WS/32MD/32WD/32XD	(Malaysia) Chooi Kah Ming (Malaysia) Low Juan Shen	(Malaysia) Low Hang Yee (Malaysia) Ng Eng Cheong
18 February	Lao International: Host: Vientiane, Laos; Venue: Settha Badminton Club; Level: International Series; Prize: $10,000; Format: 64MS/32WS/32MD/32WD/32XD	Score: 18–21, 21–18, 21–14	
18 February	Lao International: Host: Vientiane, Laos; Venue: Settha Badminton Club; Level: International Series; Prize: $10,000; Format: 64MS/32WS/32MD/32WD/32XD	(Singapore) Jin Yujia (Singapore) Lim Ming Hui	(Thailand) Ruethaichanok Laisuan (Thailand) Supamart Mingchua
18 February	Lao International: Host: Vientiane, Laos; Venue: Settha Badminton Club; Level: International Series; Prize: $10,000; Format: 64MS/32WS/32MD/32WD/32XD	Score: 23–21, 12–21, 21–14	
18 February	Lao International: Host: Vientiane, Laos; Venue: Settha Badminton Club; Level: International Series; Prize: $10,000; Format: 64MS/32WS/32MD/32WD/32XD	(Thailand) Weeraphat Phakjarung (Thailand) Chasinee Korepap	(Thailand) Mek Narongrit (Thailand) Kwanchanok Sudjaipraparat
18 February	Lao International: Host: Vientiane, Laos; Venue: Settha Badminton Club; Level: International Series; Prize: $10,000; Format: 64MS/32WS/32MD/32WD/32XD	Score: 21–8, 30–28	
18 February	Uganda International: Host: Kampala, Uganda; Venue: MTN Arena; Level: International Series; Prize: $10,000; Format: 32MS/32WS/32MD/16WD/32XD	(India) B. M. Rahul Bharadwaj	(Iceland) Kari Gunnarsson
18 February	Uganda International: Host: Kampala, Uganda; Venue: MTN Arena; Level: International Series; Prize: $10,000; Format: 32MS/32WS/32MD/16WD/32XD	Score: 22–24, 22–20, 21–17	
18 February	Uganda International: Host: Kampala, Uganda; Venue: MTN Arena; Level: International Series; Prize: $10,000; Format: 32MS/32WS/32MD/16WD/32XD	(Myanmar) Thet Htar Thuzar	(Jordan) Domou Amro
18 February	Uganda International: Host: Kampala, Uganda; Venue: MTN Arena; Level: International Series; Prize: $10,000; Format: 32MS/32WS/32MD/16WD/32XD	Score: 21–14, 21–12	
18 February	Uganda International: Host: Kampala, Uganda; Venue: MTN Arena; Level: International Series; Prize: $10,000; Format: 32MS/32WS/32MD/16WD/32XD	(Nigeria) Godwin Olofua (Nigeria) Anuoluwapo Juwon Opeyori	(India) Siddhartha (Egypt) Ahmed Salah
18 February	Uganda International: Host: Kampala, Uganda; Venue: MTN Arena; Level: International Series; Prize: $10,000; Format: 32MS/32WS/32MD/16WD/32XD	Score: 21–18, 21–11	
18 February	Uganda International: Host: Kampala, Uganda; Venue: MTN Arena; Level: International Series; Prize: $10,000; Format: 32MS/32WS/32MD/16WD/32XD	(Egypt) Doha Hany (Egypt) Hadia Hosny	(Iran) Samin Abedkhojasteh (Jordan) Domou Amro
18 February	Uganda International: Host: Kampala, Uganda; Venue: MTN Arena; Level: International Series; Prize: $10,000; Format: 32MS/32WS/32MD/16WD/32XD	Score: 21–17, 12–21, 24–22	
18 February	Uganda International: Host: Kampala, Uganda; Venue: MTN Arena; Level: International Series; Prize: $10,000; Format: 32MS/32WS/32MD/16WD/32XD	(United States) Howard Shu (United States) Paula Lynn Obañana	(United States) Vinson Chiu (United States) Breanna Chi
18 February	Uganda International: Host: Kampala, Uganda; Venue: MTN Arena; Level: International Series; Prize: $10,000; Format: 32MS/32WS/32MD/16WD/32XD	Score: 21–9, 21–12	
25 February	German Open (Draw): Host: Mülheim, Germany; Venue: Innogy Sporthalle; Level: Super 300; Prize: $150,000; Format: 32MS/32WS/32MD/32WD/32XD	(Japan) Kento Momota	(Japan) Kenta Nishimoto
25 February	German Open (Draw): Host: Mülheim, Germany; Venue: Innogy Sporthalle; Level: Super 300; Prize: $150,000; Format: 32MS/32WS/32MD/32WD/32XD	Score: 21–10, 21–16	
25 February	German Open (Draw): Host: Mülheim, Germany; Venue: Innogy Sporthalle; Level: Super 300; Prize: $150,000; Format: 32MS/32WS/32MD/32WD/32XD	(Japan) Akane Yamaguchi	(Thailand) Ratchanok Intanon
25 February	German Open (Draw): Host: Mülheim, Germany; Venue: Innogy Sporthalle; Level: Super 300; Prize: $150,000; Format: 32MS/32WS/32MD/32WD/32XD	Score: 16–21, 21–14, 25–23	
25 February	German Open (Draw): Host: Mülheim, Germany; Venue: Innogy Sporthalle; Level: Super 300; Prize: $150,000; Format: 32MS/32WS/32MD/32WD/32XD	(Japan) Hiroyuki Endo (Japan) Yuta Watanabe	(Japan) Takeshi Kamura (Japan) Keigo Sonoda
25 February	German Open (Draw): Host: Mülheim, Germany; Venue: Innogy Sporthalle; Level: Super 300; Prize: $150,000; Format: 32MS/32WS/32MD/32WD/32XD	Score: 15–21, 21–11, 21–12	
25 February	German Open (Draw): Host: Mülheim, Germany; Venue: Innogy Sporthalle; Level: Super 300; Prize: $150,000; Format: 32MS/32WS/32MD/32WD/32XD	(China) Du Yue (China) Li Yinhui	(Japan) Misaki Matsutomo (Japan) Ayaka Takahashi
25 February	German Open (Draw): Host: Mülheim, Germany; Venue: Innogy Sporthalle; Level: Super 300; Prize: $150,000; Format: 32MS/32WS/32MD/32WD/32XD	Score: 22–20, 21–15	
25 February	German Open (Draw): Host: Mülheim, Germany; Venue: Innogy Sporthalle; Level: Super 300; Prize: $150,000; Format: 32MS/32WS/32MD/32WD/32XD	(South Korea) Seo Seung-jae (South Korea) Chae Yoo-jung	(Indonesia) Hafiz Faizal (Indonesia) Gloria Emanuelle Widjaja
25 February	German Open (Draw): Host: Mülheim, Germany; Venue: Innogy Sporthalle; Level: Super 300; Prize: $150,000; Format: 32MS/32WS/32MD/32WD/32XD	Score: 21–17, 21–11	
25 February	Slovak International: Host: Trenčín, Slovakia; Venue: Športové centrum M-Šport Trenčín; Level: Future Series; Format: 32MS/32WS/32MD/32WD/32XD	(Denmark) Kim Bruun	(Bulgaria) Ivan Rusev
25 February	Slovak International: Host: Trenčín, Slovakia; Venue: Športové centrum M-Šport Trenčín; Level: Future Series; Format: 32MS/32WS/32MD/32WD/32XD	Score: 21–18, 21–11	
25 February	Slovak International: Host: Trenčín, Slovakia; Venue: Športové centrum M-Šport Trenčín; Level: Future Series; Format: 32MS/32WS/32MD/32WD/32XD	(Thailand) Porntip Buranaprasertsuk	(Wales) Jordan Hart
25 February	Slovak International: Host: Trenčín, Slovakia; Venue: Športové centrum M-Šport Trenčín; Level: Future Series; Format: 32MS/32WS/32MD/32WD/32XD	Score: 21–17, 21–17	
25 February	Slovak International: Host: Trenčín, Slovakia; Venue: Športové centrum M-Šport Trenčín; Level: Future Series; Format: 32MS/32WS/32MD/32WD/32XD	(Thailand) Supak Jomkoh (Thailand) Wachirawit Sothon	(Bulgaria) Daniel Nikolov (Bulgaria) Ivan Rusev
25 February	Slovak International: Host: Trenčín, Slovakia; Venue: Športové centrum M-Šport Trenčín; Level: Future Series; Format: 32MS/32WS/32MD/32WD/32XD	Score: 21–13, 21–14	
25 February	Slovak International: Host: Trenčín, Slovakia; Venue: Športové centrum M-Šport Trenčín; Level: Future Series; Format: 32MS/32WS/32MD/32WD/32XD	(Estonia) Kati-Kreet Marran (Estonia) Helina Rüütel	(Germany) Lisa Kaminski (Germany) Hannah Pohl
25 February	Slovak International: Host: Trenčín, Slovakia; Venue: Športové centrum M-Šport Trenčín; Level: Future Series; Format: 32MS/32WS/32MD/32WD/32XD	Score: 21–13, 21–9	
25 February	Slovak International: Host: Trenčín, Slovakia; Venue: Športové centrum M-Šport Trenčín; Level: Future Series; Format: 32MS/32WS/32MD/32WD/32XD	(Thailand) Supak Jomkoh (Thailand) Supissara Paewsampran	(Spain) Alberto Zapico (Spain) Lorena Uslé
25 February	Slovak International: Host: Trenčín, Slovakia; Venue: Športové centrum M-Šport Trenčín; Level: Future Series; Format: 32MS/32WS/32MD/32WD/32XD	Score: 21–18, 21–14	
25 February	Kenya International: Host: Nairobi, Kenya; Venue: Mpesa Foundation Academy; Level: Future Series; Format: 32MS/32WS/32MD/16WD/32XD	(India) B. M. Rahul Bharadwaj	(India) Aman Farogh Sanjay
25 February	Kenya International: Host: Nairobi, Kenya; Venue: Mpesa Foundation Academy; Level: Future Series; Format: 32MS/32WS/32MD/16WD/32XD	Score: 22–20, 15–21, 21–18	
25 February	Kenya International: Host: Nairobi, Kenya; Venue: Mpesa Foundation Academy; Level: Future Series; Format: 32MS/32WS/32MD/16WD/32XD	(Myanmar) Thet Htar Thuzar	(Jordan) Domou Amro
25 February	Kenya International: Host: Nairobi, Kenya; Venue: Mpesa Foundation Academy; Level: Future Series; Format: 32MS/32WS/32MD/16WD/32XD	Score: 21–10, 21–10	
25 February	Kenya International: Host: Nairobi, Kenya; Venue: Mpesa Foundation Academy; Level: Future Series; Format: 32MS/32WS/32MD/16WD/32XD	(Algeria) Koceila Mammeri (Algeria) Youcef Sabri Medel	(Mauritius) Aatish Lubah (Mauritius) Georges Paul
25 February	Kenya International: Host: Nairobi, Kenya; Venue: Mpesa Foundation Academy; Level: Future Series; Format: 32MS/32WS/32MD/16WD/32XD	Score: 14–21, 22–20, 21–18	
25 February	Kenya International: Host: Nairobi, Kenya; Venue: Mpesa Foundation Academy; Level: Future Series; Format: 32MS/32WS/32MD/16WD/32XD	(Lithuania) Vytaute Fomkinaite (Lithuania) Gerda Voitechovskaja	(Egypt) Doha Hany (Egypt) Hadia Hosny
25 February	Kenya International: Host: Nairobi, Kenya; Venue: Mpesa Foundation Academy; Level: Future Series; Format: 32MS/32WS/32MD/16WD/32XD	Score: 21–15, 21–17	
25 February	Kenya International: Host: Nairobi, Kenya; Venue: Mpesa Foundation Academy; Level: Future Series; Format: 32MS/32WS/32MD/16WD/32XD	(Jordan) Bahaedeen Ahmad Alshannik (Jordan) Domou Amro	(Egypt) Ahmed Salah (Egypt) Hadia Hosny
25 February	Kenya International: Host: Nairobi, Kenya; Venue: Mpesa Foundation Academy; Level: Future Series; Format: 32MS/32WS/32MD/16WD/32XD	Score: 11–21, 21–10, 21–15	

=== March ===
Week commencing	Tournament	Champions	Runners-up
4 March	All England Open (Draw): Host: Birmingham, England; Venue: Arena Birmingham; Level: Super 1000; Prize: $1,000,000; Format: 32MS/32WS/32MD/32WD/32XD	(Japan) Kento Momota	(Denmark) Viktor Axelsen
4 March	All England Open (Draw): Host: Birmingham, England; Venue: Arena Birmingham; Level: Super 1000; Prize: $1,000,000; Format: 32MS/32WS/32MD/32WD/32XD	Score: 21–11, 15–21, 21–15	
4 March	All England Open (Draw): Host: Birmingham, England; Venue: Arena Birmingham; Level: Super 1000; Prize: $1,000,000; Format: 32MS/32WS/32MD/32WD/32XD	(China) Chen Yufei	(Chinese Taipei) Tai Tzu-ying
4 March	All England Open (Draw): Host: Birmingham, England; Venue: Arena Birmingham; Level: Super 1000; Prize: $1,000,000; Format: 32MS/32WS/32MD/32WD/32XD	Score: 21–17, 21–17	
4 March	All England Open (Draw): Host: Birmingham, England; Venue: Arena Birmingham; Level: Super 1000; Prize: $1,000,000; Format: 32MS/32WS/32MD/32WD/32XD	(Indonesia) Mohammad Ahsan (Indonesia) Hendra Setiawan	(Malaysia) Aaron Chia (Malaysia) Soh Wooi Yik
4 March	All England Open (Draw): Host: Birmingham, England; Venue: Arena Birmingham; Level: Super 1000; Prize: $1,000,000; Format: 32MS/32WS/32MD/32WD/32XD	Score: 11–21, 21–14, 21–12	
4 March	All England Open (Draw): Host: Birmingham, England; Venue: Arena Birmingham; Level: Super 1000; Prize: $1,000,000; Format: 32MS/32WS/32MD/32WD/32XD	(China) Chen Qingchen (China) Jia Yifan	(Japan) Mayu Matsumoto (Japan) Wakana Nagahara
4 March	All England Open (Draw): Host: Birmingham, England; Venue: Arena Birmingham; Level: Super 1000; Prize: $1,000,000; Format: 32MS/32WS/32MD/32WD/32XD	Score: 18–21, 22–20, 21–11	
4 March	All England Open (Draw): Host: Birmingham, England; Venue: Arena Birmingham; Level: Super 1000; Prize: $1,000,000; Format: 32MS/32WS/32MD/32WD/32XD	(China) Zheng Siwei (China) Huang Yaqiong	(Japan) Yuta Watanabe (Japan) Arisa Higashino
4 March	All England Open (Draw): Host: Birmingham, England; Venue: Arena Birmingham; Level: Super 1000; Prize: $1,000,000; Format: 32MS/32WS/32MD/32WD/32XD	Score: 21–17, 22–20	
4 March	Jamaica International: Host: Kingston, Jamaica; Venue: National Indoor Sport Centre; Level: International Series; Prize: $10,000; Format: 32MS/32WS/32MD/16WD/32XD	(Japan) Kodai Naraoka	(Guatemala) Kevin Cordón
4 March	Jamaica International: Host: Kingston, Jamaica; Venue: National Indoor Sport Centre; Level: International Series; Prize: $10,000; Format: 32MS/32WS/32MD/16WD/32XD	Score: 21–17, 21–8	
4 March	Jamaica International: Host: Kingston, Jamaica; Venue: National Indoor Sport Centre; Level: International Series; Prize: $10,000; Format: 32MS/32WS/32MD/16WD/32XD	(Wales) Jordan Hart	(Israel) Ksenia Polikarpova
4 March	Jamaica International: Host: Kingston, Jamaica; Venue: National Indoor Sport Centre; Level: International Series; Prize: $10,000; Format: 32MS/32WS/32MD/16WD/32XD	Score: 23–21, 21–18	
4 March	Jamaica International: Host: Kingston, Jamaica; Venue: National Indoor Sport Centre; Level: International Series; Prize: $10,000; Format: 32MS/32WS/32MD/16WD/32XD	(Guatemala) Jonathan Solís (Guatemala) Rodolfo Ramírez	(Jamaica) Gareth Henry (Jamaica) Samuel Ricketts
4 March	Jamaica International: Host: Kingston, Jamaica; Venue: National Indoor Sport Centre; Level: International Series; Prize: $10,000; Format: 32MS/32WS/32MD/16WD/32XD	Score: 21–8, 14–21, 21–18	
4 March	Jamaica International: Host: Kingston, Jamaica; Venue: National Indoor Sport Centre; Level: International Series; Prize: $10,000; Format: 32MS/32WS/32MD/16WD/32XD	(United States) Breanna Chi (United States) Jennie Gai	(Peru) Inés Castillo (Peru) Dánica Nishimura
4 March	Jamaica International: Host: Kingston, Jamaica; Venue: National Indoor Sport Centre; Level: International Series; Prize: $10,000; Format: 32MS/32WS/32MD/16WD/32XD	Score: 21–11, 21–6	
4 March	Jamaica International: Host: Kingston, Jamaica; Venue: National Indoor Sport Centre; Level: International Series; Prize: $10,000; Format: 32MS/32WS/32MD/16WD/32XD	(Brazil) Artur Pomoceno (Brazil) Lohaynny Vicente	(United States) Vinson Chiu (United States) Breanna Chi
4 March	Jamaica International: Host: Kingston, Jamaica; Venue: National Indoor Sport Centre; Level: International Series; Prize: $10,000; Format: 32MS/32WS/32MD/16WD/32XD	Score: 21–17, 14–21, 21–19	
4 March	Portuguese International: Host: Caldas da Rainha, Portugal; Venue: High Performance Center for Badminton; Level: International Series; Prize: $10,000; Format: 32MS/32WS/32MD/32WD/32XD	(Sweden) Felix Burestedt	(Malaysia) Soo Teck Zhi
4 March	Portuguese International: Host: Caldas da Rainha, Portugal; Venue: High Performance Center for Badminton; Level: International Series; Prize: $10,000; Format: 32MS/32WS/32MD/32WD/32XD	Score: 21–23, 21–8, 21–17	
4 March	Portuguese International: Host: Caldas da Rainha, Portugal; Venue: High Performance Center for Badminton; Level: International Series; Prize: $10,000; Format: 32MS/32WS/32MD/32WD/32XD	(Thailand) Porntip Buranaprasertsuk	(Chinese Taipei) Hung En-tzu
4 March	Portuguese International: Host: Caldas da Rainha, Portugal; Venue: High Performance Center for Badminton; Level: International Series; Prize: $10,000; Format: 32MS/32WS/32MD/32WD/32XD	Score: 21–12, 19–21, 21–11	
4 March	Portuguese International: Host: Caldas da Rainha, Portugal; Venue: High Performance Center for Badminton; Level: International Series; Prize: $10,000; Format: 32MS/32WS/32MD/32WD/32XD	(Chinese Taipei) Chang Ko-chi (Chinese Taipei) Lee Fang-jen	(Scotland) Christopher Grimley (Scotland) Matthew Grimley
4 March	Portuguese International: Host: Caldas da Rainha, Portugal; Venue: High Performance Center for Badminton; Level: International Series; Prize: $10,000; Format: 32MS/32WS/32MD/32WD/32XD	Score: 16–21, 21–16, 21–13	
4 March	Portuguese International: Host: Caldas da Rainha, Portugal; Venue: High Performance Center for Badminton; Level: International Series; Prize: $10,000; Format: 32MS/32WS/32MD/32WD/32XD	(Denmark) Julie Finne-Ipsen (Sweden) Clara Nistad	(Chinese Taipei) Chang Ching-hui (Chinese Taipei) Yang Ching-tun
4 March	Portuguese International: Host: Caldas da Rainha, Portugal; Venue: High Performance Center for Badminton; Level: International Series; Prize: $10,000; Format: 32MS/32WS/32MD/32WD/32XD	Score: 21–11, 21–15	
4 March	Portuguese International: Host: Caldas da Rainha, Portugal; Venue: High Performance Center for Badminton; Level: International Series; Prize: $10,000; Format: 32MS/32WS/32MD/32WD/32XD	(Chinese Taipei) Chang Ko-chi (Chinese Taipei) Lee Chih-chen	(Bulgaria) Alex Vlaar (Bulgaria) Mariya Mitsova
4 March	Portuguese International: Host: Caldas da Rainha, Portugal; Venue: High Performance Center for Badminton; Level: International Series; Prize: $10,000; Format: 32MS/32WS/32MD/32WD/32XD	Score: 21–12, 21–14	
11 March	Swiss Open (Draw): Host: Basel, Switzerland; Venue: St. Jakobshalle; Level: Super 300; Prize: $150,000; Format: 32MS/32WS/32MD/32WD/32XD	(China) Shi Yuqi	(India) B. Sai Praneeth
11 March	Swiss Open (Draw): Host: Basel, Switzerland; Venue: St. Jakobshalle; Level: Super 300; Prize: $150,000; Format: 32MS/32WS/32MD/32WD/32XD	Score: 19–21, 21–18, 21–12	
11 March	Swiss Open (Draw): Host: Basel, Switzerland; Venue: St. Jakobshalle; Level: Super 300; Prize: $150,000; Format: 32MS/32WS/32MD/32WD/32XD	(China) Chen Yufei	(Japan) Saena Kawakami
11 March	Swiss Open (Draw): Host: Basel, Switzerland; Venue: St. Jakobshalle; Level: Super 300; Prize: $150,000; Format: 32MS/32WS/32MD/32WD/32XD	Score: 21–9, 21–16	
11 March	Swiss Open (Draw): Host: Basel, Switzerland; Venue: St. Jakobshalle; Level: Super 300; Prize: $150,000; Format: 32MS/32WS/32MD/32WD/32XD	(Indonesia) Fajar Alfian (Indonesia) Muhammad Rian Ardianto	(Chinese Taipei) Lee Yang (Chinese Taipei) Wang Chi-lin
11 March	Swiss Open (Draw): Host: Basel, Switzerland; Venue: St. Jakobshalle; Level: Super 300; Prize: $150,000; Format: 32MS/32WS/32MD/32WD/32XD	Score: 21–19, 21–16	
11 March	Swiss Open (Draw): Host: Basel, Switzerland; Venue: St. Jakobshalle; Level: Super 300; Prize: $150,000; Format: 32MS/32WS/32MD/32WD/32XD	(South Korea) Chang Ye-na (South Korea) Jung Kyung-eun	(Japan) Nami Matsuyama (Japan) Chiharu Shida
11 March	Swiss Open (Draw): Host: Basel, Switzerland; Venue: St. Jakobshalle; Level: Super 300; Prize: $150,000; Format: 32MS/32WS/32MD/32WD/32XD	Score: 21–16, 21–13	
11 March	Swiss Open (Draw): Host: Basel, Switzerland; Venue: St. Jakobshalle; Level: Super 300; Prize: $150,000; Format: 32MS/32WS/32MD/32WD/32XD	(Denmark) Mathias Bay-Smidt (Denmark) Rikke Søby Hansen	(Indonesia) Rinov Rivaldy (Indonesia) Pitha Haningtyas Mentari
11 March	Swiss Open (Draw): Host: Basel, Switzerland; Venue: St. Jakobshalle; Level: Super 300; Prize: $150,000; Format: 32MS/32WS/32MD/32WD/32XD	Score: 21–18, 12–21, 21–16	
11 March	Lingshui China Masters (Draw): Host: Lingshui, China; Venue: Agile Stadium; Level: Super 100; Prize: $75,000; Format: 64MS/32WS/32MD/32WD/32XD	(China) Weng Hongyang	(China) Liu Haichao
11 March	Lingshui China Masters (Draw): Host: Lingshui, China; Venue: Agile Stadium; Level: Super 100; Prize: $75,000; Format: 64MS/32WS/32MD/32WD/32XD	Score: 21–7, 21–7	
11 March	Lingshui China Masters (Draw): Host: Lingshui, China; Venue: Agile Stadium; Level: Super 100; Prize: $75,000; Format: 64MS/32WS/32MD/32WD/32XD	(South Korea) Kim Ga-eun	(China) Zhang Yiman
11 March	Lingshui China Masters (Draw): Host: Lingshui, China; Venue: Agile Stadium; Level: Super 100; Prize: $75,000; Format: 64MS/32WS/32MD/32WD/32XD	Score: 22–20, 14–21, 21–17	
11 March	Lingshui China Masters (Draw): Host: Lingshui, China; Venue: Agile Stadium; Level: Super 100; Prize: $75,000; Format: 64MS/32WS/32MD/32WD/32XD	(Chinese Taipei) Lee Jhe-huei (Chinese Taipei) Yang Po-hsuan	(China) Ou Xuanyi (China) Ren Xiangyu
11 March	Lingshui China Masters (Draw): Host: Lingshui, China; Venue: Agile Stadium; Level: Super 100; Prize: $75,000; Format: 64MS/32WS/32MD/32WD/32XD	Score: 21–17, 21–16	
11 March	Lingshui China Masters (Draw): Host: Lingshui, China; Venue: Agile Stadium; Level: Super 100; Prize: $75,000; Format: 64MS/32WS/32MD/32WD/32XD	(South Korea) Baek Ha-na (South Korea) Kim Hye-rin	(China) Liu Xuanxuan (China) Xia Yuting
11 March	Lingshui China Masters (Draw): Host: Lingshui, China; Venue: Agile Stadium; Level: Super 100; Prize: $75,000; Format: 64MS/32WS/32MD/32WD/32XD	Score: 21–14, 14–21, 21–15	
11 March	Lingshui China Masters (Draw): Host: Lingshui, China; Venue: Agile Stadium; Level: Super 100; Prize: $75,000; Format: 64MS/32WS/32MD/32WD/32XD	(Hong Kong) Tang Chun Man (Hong Kong) Ng Tsz Yau	(China) Guo Xinwa (China) Liu Xuanxuan
11 March	Lingshui China Masters (Draw): Host: Lingshui, China; Venue: Agile Stadium; Level: Super 100; Prize: $75,000; Format: 64MS/32WS/32MD/32WD/32XD	Score: 16–21, 21–14, 21–13	
11 March	Giraldilla International: Host: Havana, Cuba; Venue: Coliseo de la Ciudad Deportiva; Level: Future Series; Format: 32MS/32WS/16MD/16WD/32XD	(Mexico) Job Castillo	(Azerbaijan) Azmy Qowimuramadhoni
11 March	Giraldilla International: Host: Havana, Cuba; Venue: Coliseo de la Ciudad Deportiva; Level: Future Series; Format: 32MS/32WS/16MD/16WD/32XD	Score: 21–12, 21–13	
11 March	Giraldilla International: Host: Havana, Cuba; Venue: Coliseo de la Ciudad Deportiva; Level: Future Series; Format: 32MS/32WS/16MD/16WD/32XD	(Wales) Jordan Hart	(Peru) Daniela Macías
11 March	Giraldilla International: Host: Havana, Cuba; Venue: Coliseo de la Ciudad Deportiva; Level: Future Series; Format: 32MS/32WS/16MD/16WD/32XD	Score: 21–17, 21–16	
11 March	Giraldilla International: Host: Havana, Cuba; Venue: Coliseo de la Ciudad Deportiva; Level: Future Series; Format: 32MS/32WS/16MD/16WD/32XD	(Peru) José Guevara (Peru) Daniel la Torre Regal	(Cuba) Ángel Herrera (Cuba) Leodannis Martínez
11 March	Giraldilla International: Host: Havana, Cuba; Venue: Coliseo de la Ciudad Deportiva; Level: Future Series; Format: 32MS/32WS/16MD/16WD/32XD	Score: 28–26, 21–18	
11 March	Giraldilla International: Host: Havana, Cuba; Venue: Coliseo de la Ciudad Deportiva; Level: Future Series; Format: 32MS/32WS/16MD/16WD/32XD	(Peru) Daniela Macías (Peru) Dánica Nishimura	(Peru) Inés Castillo (Peru) Paula la Torre
11 March	Giraldilla International: Host: Havana, Cuba; Venue: Coliseo de la Ciudad Deportiva; Level: Future Series; Format: 32MS/32WS/16MD/16WD/32XD	Score: 21–9, 21–11	
11 March	Giraldilla International: Host: Havana, Cuba; Venue: Coliseo de la Ciudad Deportiva; Level: Future Series; Format: 32MS/32WS/16MD/16WD/32XD	(Peru) Mario Cuba (Peru) Daniela Macías	(Peru) José Guevara (Peru) Inés Castillo
11 March	Giraldilla International: Host: Havana, Cuba; Venue: Coliseo de la Ciudad Deportiva; Level: Future Series; Format: 32MS/32WS/16MD/16WD/32XD	Score: 21–12, 21–19	
18 March	Badminton Asia Mixed Team Championships (Draw): Host: Hong Kong; Venue: Queen Elizabeth Stadium; Level: Continental Team Championships; Format: 11 Teams (Round robin)	China	Japan
18 March	Badminton Asia Mixed Team Championships (Draw): Host: Hong Kong; Venue: Queen Elizabeth Stadium; Level: Continental Team Championships; Format: 11 Teams (Round robin)	He Jiting / Du Yue; Lu Guangzu; Han Chengkai / Zhou Haodong; Han Yue; Du Yue / Li Yinhui	Yuta Watanabe / Arisa Higashino; Kanta Tsuneyama; Takuro Hoki / Yugo Kobayashi; Sayaka Takahashi; Ayako Sakuramoto / Yukiko Takahata
18 March	Badminton Asia Mixed Team Championships (Draw): Host: Hong Kong; Venue: Queen Elizabeth Stadium; Level: Continental Team Championships; Format: 11 Teams (Round robin)	Score: 3–2	
18 March	Orléans Masters (Draw): Host: Orléans, France; Venue: Palais des Sports; Level: Super 100; Prize: $75,000; Format: 64MS/32WS/32MD/32WD/32XD	(Japan) Koki Watanabe	(France) Thomas Rouxel
18 March	Orléans Masters (Draw): Host: Orléans, France; Venue: Palais des Sports; Level: Super 100; Prize: $75,000; Format: 64MS/32WS/32MD/32WD/32XD	Score: 18–21, 21–12, 21–19	
18 March	Orléans Masters (Draw): Host: Orléans, France; Venue: Palais des Sports; Level: Super 100; Prize: $75,000; Format: 64MS/32WS/32MD/32WD/32XD	(Japan) Saena Kawakami	(Scotland) Kirsty Gilmour
18 March	Orléans Masters (Draw): Host: Orléans, France; Venue: Palais des Sports; Level: Super 100; Prize: $75,000; Format: 64MS/32WS/32MD/32WD/32XD	Score: 21–8, 18–21, 21–16	
18 March	Orléans Masters (Draw): Host: Orléans, France; Venue: Palais des Sports; Level: Super 100; Prize: $75,000; Format: 64MS/32WS/32MD/32WD/32XD	(Chinese Taipei) Lee Yang (Chinese Taipei) Wang Chi-lin	(Japan) Akira Koga (Japan) Taichi Saito
18 March	Orléans Masters (Draw): Host: Orléans, France; Venue: Palais des Sports; Level: Super 100; Prize: $75,000; Format: 64MS/32WS/32MD/32WD/32XD	Score: 16–21, 22–20, 21–15	
18 March	Orléans Masters (Draw): Host: Orléans, France; Venue: Palais des Sports; Level: Super 100; Prize: $75,000; Format: 64MS/32WS/32MD/32WD/32XD	(England) Chloe Birch (England) Lauren Smith	(Chinese Taipei) Hsu Ya-ching (Chinese Taipei) Hu Ling-fang
18 March	Orléans Masters (Draw): Host: Orléans, France; Venue: Palais des Sports; Level: Super 100; Prize: $75,000; Format: 64MS/32WS/32MD/32WD/32XD	Score: 21–18, 21–17	
18 March	Orléans Masters (Draw): Host: Orléans, France; Venue: Palais des Sports; Level: Super 100; Prize: $75,000; Format: 64MS/32WS/32MD/32WD/32XD	(France) Thom Gicquel (France) Delphine Delrue	(France) Ronan Labar (France) Anne Tran
18 March	Orléans Masters (Draw): Host: Orléans, France; Venue: Palais des Sports; Level: Super 100; Prize: $75,000; Format: 64MS/32WS/32MD/32WD/32XD	Score: 21–11, 21–14	
18 March	North Harbour International: Host: Auckland, New Zealand; Venue: Harcouts Cooper & Co North Harbour Badminton Centre; Level: Future Series; Prize: $5,000; Format: 64MS/32WS/32MD/16WD/32XD	(Vietnam) Nguyễn Tiến Minh	(China) Gao Zhengze
18 March	North Harbour International: Host: Auckland, New Zealand; Venue: Harcouts Cooper & Co North Harbour Badminton Centre; Level: Future Series; Prize: $5,000; Format: 64MS/32WS/32MD/16WD/32XD	Score: 21–13, 21–15	
18 March	North Harbour International: Host: Auckland, New Zealand; Venue: Harcouts Cooper & Co North Harbour Badminton Centre; Level: Future Series; Prize: $5,000; Format: 64MS/32WS/32MD/16WD/32XD	(China) Qiu Ziying	(Australia) Qin Jinjing
18 March	North Harbour International: Host: Auckland, New Zealand; Venue: Harcouts Cooper & Co North Harbour Badminton Centre; Level: Future Series; Prize: $5,000; Format: 64MS/32WS/32MD/16WD/32XD	Score: 11–3 Retired	
18 March	North Harbour International: Host: Auckland, New Zealand; Venue: Harcouts Cooper & Co North Harbour Badminton Centre; Level: Future Series; Prize: $5,000; Format: 64MS/32WS/32MD/16WD/32XD	(China) Xuheng Zhuanyi (China) Zhang Binrong	(Australia) Simon Leung (Australia) Mitchell Wheller
18 March	North Harbour International: Host: Auckland, New Zealand; Venue: Harcouts Cooper & Co North Harbour Badminton Centre; Level: Future Series; Prize: $5,000; Format: 64MS/32WS/32MD/16WD/32XD	Score: 21–14, 21–16	
18 March	North Harbour International: Host: Auckland, New Zealand; Venue: Harcouts Cooper & Co North Harbour Badminton Centre; Level: Future Series; Prize: $5,000; Format: 64MS/32WS/32MD/16WD/32XD	(China) Pan Hanxiao (China) Yang Jiayi	(China) Hou Fangfang (China) Li Jiajia
18 March	North Harbour International: Host: Auckland, New Zealand; Venue: Harcouts Cooper & Co North Harbour Badminton Centre; Level: Future Series; Prize: $5,000; Format: 64MS/32WS/32MD/16WD/32XD	Score: 22–20, 21–13	
18 March	North Harbour International: Host: Auckland, New Zealand; Venue: Harcouts Cooper & Co North Harbour Badminton Centre; Level: Future Series; Prize: $5,000; Format: 64MS/32WS/32MD/16WD/32XD	(China) Zhang Hanyu (China) Pan Hanxiao	(China) Yan Yuhang (China) Yang Jiayi
18 March	North Harbour International: Host: Auckland, New Zealand; Venue: Harcouts Cooper & Co North Harbour Badminton Centre; Level: Future Series; Prize: $5,000; Format: 64MS/32WS/32MD/16WD/32XD	Score: 21–10, 18–21, 21–15	
25 March	India Open (Draw): Host: New Delhi, India; Venue: K. D. Jadhav Indoor Stadium; Level: Super 500; Prize: $350,000; Format: 32MS/32WS/32MD/32WD/32XD	(Denmark) Viktor Axelsen	(India) Srikanth Kidambi
25 March	India Open (Draw): Host: New Delhi, India; Venue: K. D. Jadhav Indoor Stadium; Level: Super 500; Prize: $350,000; Format: 32MS/32WS/32MD/32WD/32XD	Score: 21–7, 22–20	
25 March	India Open (Draw): Host: New Delhi, India; Venue: K. D. Jadhav Indoor Stadium; Level: Super 500; Prize: $350,000; Format: 32MS/32WS/32MD/32WD/32XD	(Thailand) Ratchanok Intanon	(China) He Bingjiao
25 March	India Open (Draw): Host: New Delhi, India; Venue: K. D. Jadhav Indoor Stadium; Level: Super 500; Prize: $350,000; Format: 32MS/32WS/32MD/32WD/32XD	Score: 21–15, 21–14	
25 March	India Open (Draw): Host: New Delhi, India; Venue: K. D. Jadhav Indoor Stadium; Level: Super 500; Prize: $350,000; Format: 32MS/32WS/32MD/32WD/32XD	(Chinese Taipei) Lee Yang (Chinese Taipei) Wang Chi-lin	(Indonesia) Ricky Karanda Suwardi (Indonesia) Angga Pratama
25 March	India Open (Draw): Host: New Delhi, India; Venue: K. D. Jadhav Indoor Stadium; Level: Super 500; Prize: $350,000; Format: 32MS/32WS/32MD/32WD/32XD	Score: 21–14, 21–14	
25 March	India Open (Draw): Host: New Delhi, India; Venue: K. D. Jadhav Indoor Stadium; Level: Super 500; Prize: $350,000; Format: 32MS/32WS/32MD/32WD/32XD	(Indonesia) Greysia Polii (Indonesia) Apriyani Rahayu	(Malaysia) Chow Mei Kuan (Malaysia) Lee Meng Yean
25 March	India Open (Draw): Host: New Delhi, India; Venue: K. D. Jadhav Indoor Stadium; Level: Super 500; Prize: $350,000; Format: 32MS/32WS/32MD/32WD/32XD	Score: 21–11, 25–23	
25 March	India Open (Draw): Host: New Delhi, India; Venue: K. D. Jadhav Indoor Stadium; Level: Super 500; Prize: $350,000; Format: 32MS/32WS/32MD/32WD/32XD	(China) Wang Yilü (China) Huang Dongping	(Indonesia) Praveen Jordan (Indonesia) Melati Daeva Oktavianti
25 March	India Open (Draw): Host: New Delhi, India; Venue: K. D. Jadhav Indoor Stadium; Level: Super 500; Prize: $350,000; Format: 32MS/32WS/32MD/32WD/32XD	Score: 21–13, 21–11	
25 March	Polish Open: Host: Częstochowa, Poland; Venue: Polonia Hall; Level: International Challenge; Prize: $25,000; Format: 64MS/32WS/32MD/32WD/32XD	(Thailand) Kunlavut Vitidsarn	(India) Lakshya Sen
25 March	Polish Open: Host: Częstochowa, Poland; Venue: Polonia Hall; Level: International Challenge; Prize: $25,000; Format: 64MS/32WS/32MD/32WD/32XD	Score: 21–17, 21–14	
25 March	Polish Open: Host: Częstochowa, Poland; Venue: Polonia Hall; Level: International Challenge; Prize: $25,000; Format: 64MS/32WS/32MD/32WD/32XD	(China) Wei Yaxin	(Germany) Yvonne Li
25 March	Polish Open: Host: Częstochowa, Poland; Venue: Polonia Hall; Level: International Challenge; Prize: $25,000; Format: 64MS/32WS/32MD/32WD/32XD	Score: 21–8, 19–21, 22–20	
25 March	Polish Open: Host: Częstochowa, Poland; Venue: Polonia Hall; Level: International Challenge; Prize: $25,000; Format: 64MS/32WS/32MD/32WD/32XD	(Chinese Taipei) Lee Jhe-huei (Chinese Taipei) Yang Po-hsuan	(England) Ben Lane (England) Sean Vendy
25 March	Polish Open: Host: Częstochowa, Poland; Venue: Polonia Hall; Level: International Challenge; Prize: $25,000; Format: 64MS/32WS/32MD/32WD/32XD	Score: 21–19, 21–16	
25 March	Polish Open: Host: Częstochowa, Poland; Venue: Polonia Hall; Level: International Challenge; Prize: $25,000; Format: 64MS/32WS/32MD/32WD/32XD	(Japan) Chisato Hoshi (Japan) Aoi Matsuda	(Denmark) Alexandra Bøje (Denmark) Mette Poulsen
25 March	Polish Open: Host: Częstochowa, Poland; Venue: Polonia Hall; Level: International Challenge; Prize: $25,000; Format: 64MS/32WS/32MD/32WD/32XD	Score: 21–18, 15–21, 21–17	
25 March	Polish Open: Host: Częstochowa, Poland; Venue: Polonia Hall; Level: International Challenge; Prize: $25,000; Format: 64MS/32WS/32MD/32WD/32XD	(England) Ben Lane (England) Jessica Pugh	(France) Thom Gicquel (France) Delphine Delrue
25 March	Polish Open: Host: Częstochowa, Poland; Venue: Polonia Hall; Level: International Challenge; Prize: $25,000; Format: 64MS/32WS/32MD/32WD/32XD	Score: 21–17, 21–15	
25 March	Waikato International: Host: Hamilton, New Zealand; Venue: Eastlink Badminton Stadium; Level: International Series; Prize: $10,000; Format: 64MS/32WS/32MD/16WD/32XD	(Vietnam) Nguyễn Tiến Minh	(China) Gao Zhengze
25 March	Waikato International: Host: Hamilton, New Zealand; Venue: Eastlink Badminton Stadium; Level: International Series; Prize: $10,000; Format: 64MS/32WS/32MD/16WD/32XD	Score: 14–21, 21–16, 21–17	
25 March	Waikato International: Host: Hamilton, New Zealand; Venue: Eastlink Badminton Stadium; Level: International Series; Prize: $10,000; Format: 64MS/32WS/32MD/16WD/32XD	(China) Wang Siqi	(China) Wu Yuqi
25 March	Waikato International: Host: Hamilton, New Zealand; Venue: Eastlink Badminton Stadium; Level: International Series; Prize: $10,000; Format: 64MS/32WS/32MD/16WD/32XD	Score: 18–21, 21–17, 21–13	
25 March	Waikato International: Host: Hamilton, New Zealand; Venue: Eastlink Badminton Stadium; Level: International Series; Prize: $10,000; Format: 64MS/32WS/32MD/16WD/32XD	(China) Xuheng Zhuanyi (China) Zhang Binrong	(Singapore) Abel Tan (Singapore) Toh Han Zhuo
25 March	Waikato International: Host: Hamilton, New Zealand; Venue: Eastlink Badminton Stadium; Level: International Series; Prize: $10,000; Format: 64MS/32WS/32MD/16WD/32XD	Score: 21–17, 21–10	
25 March	Waikato International: Host: Hamilton, New Zealand; Venue: Eastlink Badminton Stadium; Level: International Series; Prize: $10,000; Format: 64MS/32WS/32MD/16WD/32XD	(China) Hou Fangfang (China) Li Jiajia	(China) Pan Hanxiao (China) Yang Jiayi
25 March	Waikato International: Host: Hamilton, New Zealand; Venue: Eastlink Badminton Stadium; Level: International Series; Prize: $10,000; Format: 64MS/32WS/32MD/16WD/32XD	Score: 21–12, 21–17	
25 March	Waikato International: Host: Hamilton, New Zealand; Venue: Eastlink Badminton Stadium; Level: International Series; Prize: $10,000; Format: 64MS/32WS/32MD/16WD/32XD	(Japan) Hiroki Midorikawa (Japan) Natsu Saito	(Australia) Simon Leung (Australia) Gronya Somerville
25 March	Waikato International: Host: Hamilton, New Zealand; Venue: Eastlink Badminton Stadium; Level: International Series; Prize: $10,000; Format: 64MS/32WS/32MD/16WD/32XD	Score: 21–15, 21–13	

=== April ===
Week commencing	Tournament	Champions	Runners-up
1 April	Malaysia Open (Draw): Host: Kuala Lumpur, Malaysia; Venue: Axiata Arena; Level: Super 750; Prize: $700,000; Format: 32MS/32WS/32MD/32WD/32XD	(China) Lin Dan	(China) Chen Long
1 April	Malaysia Open (Draw): Host: Kuala Lumpur, Malaysia; Venue: Axiata Arena; Level: Super 750; Prize: $700,000; Format: 32MS/32WS/32MD/32WD/32XD	Score: 9–21, 21–17, 21–11	
1 April	Malaysia Open (Draw): Host: Kuala Lumpur, Malaysia; Venue: Axiata Arena; Level: Super 750; Prize: $700,000; Format: 32MS/32WS/32MD/32WD/32XD	(Chinese Taipei) Tai Tzu-ying	(Japan) Akane Yamaguchi
1 April	Malaysia Open (Draw): Host: Kuala Lumpur, Malaysia; Venue: Axiata Arena; Level: Super 750; Prize: $700,000; Format: 32MS/32WS/32MD/32WD/32XD	Score: 21–16, 21–19	
1 April	Malaysia Open (Draw): Host: Kuala Lumpur, Malaysia; Venue: Axiata Arena; Level: Super 750; Prize: $700,000; Format: 32MS/32WS/32MD/32WD/32XD	(China) Li Junhui (China) Liu Yuchen	(Japan) Takeshi Kamura (Japan) Keigo Sonoda
1 April	Malaysia Open (Draw): Host: Kuala Lumpur, Malaysia; Venue: Axiata Arena; Level: Super 750; Prize: $700,000; Format: 32MS/32WS/32MD/32WD/32XD	Score: 21–12, 21–17	
1 April	Malaysia Open (Draw): Host: Kuala Lumpur, Malaysia; Venue: Axiata Arena; Level: Super 750; Prize: $700,000; Format: 32MS/32WS/32MD/32WD/32XD	(China) Chen Qingchen (China) Jia Yifan	(China) Du Yue (China) Li Yinhui
1 April	Malaysia Open (Draw): Host: Kuala Lumpur, Malaysia; Venue: Axiata Arena; Level: Super 750; Prize: $700,000; Format: 32MS/32WS/32MD/32WD/32XD	Score: 21–14, 21–15	
1 April	Malaysia Open (Draw): Host: Kuala Lumpur, Malaysia; Venue: Axiata Arena; Level: Super 750; Prize: $700,000; Format: 32MS/32WS/32MD/32WD/32XD	(China) Zheng Siwei (China) Huang Yaqiong	(China) Wang Yilü (China) Huang Dongping
1 April	Malaysia Open (Draw): Host: Kuala Lumpur, Malaysia; Venue: Axiata Arena; Level: Super 750; Prize: $700,000; Format: 32MS/32WS/32MD/32WD/32XD	Score: 21–17, 21–13	
1 April	Osaka International: Host: Moriguchi, Osaka, Japan; Venue: Moriguchi City Gymnasium; Level: International Challenge; Prize: $25,000; Format: 32MS/32WS/32MD/32WD/32XD	(Japan) Koki Watanabe	(Japan) Takuma Obayashi
1 April	Osaka International: Host: Moriguchi, Osaka, Japan; Venue: Moriguchi City Gymnasium; Level: International Challenge; Prize: $25,000; Format: 32MS/32WS/32MD/32WD/32XD	Score: 19–21, 21–17, 21–7	
1 April	Osaka International: Host: Moriguchi, Osaka, Japan; Venue: Moriguchi City Gymnasium; Level: International Challenge; Prize: $25,000; Format: 32MS/32WS/32MD/32WD/32XD	(Japan) Saena Kawakami	(South Korea) Lee Se-yeon
1 April	Osaka International: Host: Moriguchi, Osaka, Japan; Venue: Moriguchi City Gymnasium; Level: International Challenge; Prize: $25,000; Format: 32MS/32WS/32MD/32WD/32XD	Score: 21–14, 21–10	
1 April	Osaka International: Host: Moriguchi, Osaka, Japan; Venue: Moriguchi City Gymnasium; Level: International Challenge; Prize: $25,000; Format: 32MS/32WS/32MD/32WD/32XD	(South Korea) Ko Sung-hyun (South Korea) Shin Baek-cheol	(South Korea) Kang Min-hyuk (South Korea) Kim Jae-hwan
1 April	Osaka International: Host: Moriguchi, Osaka, Japan; Venue: Moriguchi City Gymnasium; Level: International Challenge; Prize: $25,000; Format: 32MS/32WS/32MD/32WD/32XD	Score: 21–13, 21–16	
1 April	Osaka International: Host: Moriguchi, Osaka, Japan; Venue: Moriguchi City Gymnasium; Level: International Challenge; Prize: $25,000; Format: 32MS/32WS/32MD/32WD/32XD	(Japan) Sayaka Hobara (Japan) Natsuki Sone	(Japan) Rira Kawashima (Japan) Saori Ozaki
1 April	Osaka International: Host: Moriguchi, Osaka, Japan; Venue: Moriguchi City Gymnasium; Level: International Challenge; Prize: $25,000; Format: 32MS/32WS/32MD/32WD/32XD	Score: 14–21, 21–10, 21–16	
1 April	Osaka International: Host: Moriguchi, Osaka, Japan; Venue: Moriguchi City Gymnasium; Level: International Challenge; Prize: $25,000; Format: 32MS/32WS/32MD/32WD/32XD	(South Korea) Kim Won-ho (South Korea) Jeong Na-eun	(China) Guo Xinwa (China) Zhang Shuxian
1 April	Osaka International: Host: Moriguchi, Osaka, Japan; Venue: Moriguchi City Gymnasium; Level: International Challenge; Prize: $25,000; Format: 32MS/32WS/32MD/32WD/32XD	Score: 21–17, 21–15	
1 April	Finnish Open: Host: Vantaa, Finland; Venue: Energia Areena; Level: International Challenge; Prize: $25,000; Format: 32MS/32WS/32MD/32WD/32XD	(Thailand) Kunlavut Vitidsarn	(Chinese Taipei) Lin Chun-yi
1 April	Finnish Open: Host: Vantaa, Finland; Venue: Energia Areena; Level: International Challenge; Prize: $25,000; Format: 32MS/32WS/32MD/32WD/32XD	Score: 21–16, 18–21, 21–14	
1 April	Finnish Open: Host: Vantaa, Finland; Venue: Energia Areena; Level: International Challenge; Prize: $25,000; Format: 32MS/32WS/32MD/32WD/32XD	(Denmark) Julie Dawall Jakobsen	(Thailand) Porntip Buranaprasertsuk
1 April	Finnish Open: Host: Vantaa, Finland; Venue: Energia Areena; Level: International Challenge; Prize: $25,000; Format: 32MS/32WS/32MD/32WD/32XD	Score: 21–18, 23–21	
1 April	Finnish Open: Host: Vantaa, Finland; Venue: Energia Areena; Level: International Challenge; Prize: $25,000; Format: 32MS/32WS/32MD/32WD/32XD	(Indonesia) Muhammad Shohibul Fikri (Indonesia) Bagas Maulana	(Germany) Jones Ralfy Jansen (Germany) Peter Käsbauer
1 April	Finnish Open: Host: Vantaa, Finland; Venue: Energia Areena; Level: International Challenge; Prize: $25,000; Format: 32MS/32WS/32MD/32WD/32XD	Score: 21–17, 21–17	
1 April	Finnish Open: Host: Vantaa, Finland; Venue: Energia Areena; Level: International Challenge; Prize: $25,000; Format: 32MS/32WS/32MD/32WD/32XD	(Japan) Erina Honda (Japan) Nozomi Shimizu	(Indonesia) Febriana Dwipuji Kusuma (Indonesia) Ribka Sugiarto
1 April	Finnish Open: Host: Vantaa, Finland; Venue: Energia Areena; Level: International Challenge; Prize: $25,000; Format: 32MS/32WS/32MD/32WD/32XD	Score: 21–15, 21–14	
1 April	Finnish Open: Host: Vantaa, Finland; Venue: Energia Areena; Level: International Challenge; Prize: $25,000; Format: 32MS/32WS/32MD/32WD/32XD	(Indonesia) Rehan Naufal Kusharjanto (Indonesia) Lisa Ayu Kusumawati	(Denmark) Mathias Bay-Smidt (Denmark) Rikke Søby Hansen
1 April	Finnish Open: Host: Vantaa, Finland; Venue: Energia Areena; Level: International Challenge; Prize: $25,000; Format: 32MS/32WS/32MD/32WD/32XD	Score: 22–20, 15–21, 21–14	
8 April	Singapore Open (Draw): Host: Singapore; Venue: Singapore Indoor Stadium; Level: Super 500; Prize: $355,000; Format: 32MS/32WS/32MD/32WD/32XD	(Japan) Kento Momota	(Indonesia) Anthony Sinisuka Ginting
8 April	Singapore Open (Draw): Host: Singapore; Venue: Singapore Indoor Stadium; Level: Super 500; Prize: $355,000; Format: 32MS/32WS/32MD/32WD/32XD	Score: 10–21, 21–19, 21–13	
8 April	Singapore Open (Draw): Host: Singapore; Venue: Singapore Indoor Stadium; Level: Super 500; Prize: $355,000; Format: 32MS/32WS/32MD/32WD/32XD	(Chinese Taipei) Tai Tzu-ying	(Japan) Nozomi Okuhara
8 April	Singapore Open (Draw): Host: Singapore; Venue: Singapore Indoor Stadium; Level: Super 500; Prize: $355,000; Format: 32MS/32WS/32MD/32WD/32XD	Score: 21–19, 21–15	
8 April	Singapore Open (Draw): Host: Singapore; Venue: Singapore Indoor Stadium; Level: Super 500; Prize: $355,000; Format: 32MS/32WS/32MD/32WD/32XD	(Japan) Takeshi Kamura (Japan) Keigo Sonoda	(Indonesia) Mohammad Ahsan (Indonesia) Hendra Setiawan
8 April	Singapore Open (Draw): Host: Singapore; Venue: Singapore Indoor Stadium; Level: Super 500; Prize: $355,000; Format: 32MS/32WS/32MD/32WD/32XD	Score: 21–13, 19–21, 21–17	
8 April	Singapore Open (Draw): Host: Singapore; Venue: Singapore Indoor Stadium; Level: Super 500; Prize: $355,000; Format: 32MS/32WS/32MD/32WD/32XD	(Japan) Mayu Matsumoto (Japan) Wakana Nagahara	(South Korea) Kim Hye-jeong (South Korea) Kong Hee-yong
8 April	Singapore Open (Draw): Host: Singapore; Venue: Singapore Indoor Stadium; Level: Super 500; Prize: $355,000; Format: 32MS/32WS/32MD/32WD/32XD	Score: 21–17, 22–20	
8 April	Singapore Open (Draw): Host: Singapore; Venue: Singapore Indoor Stadium; Level: Super 500; Prize: $355,000; Format: 32MS/32WS/32MD/32WD/32XD	(Thailand) Dechapol Puavaranukroh (Thailand) Sapsiree Taerattanachai	(Malaysia) Tan Kian Meng (Malaysia) Lai Pei Jing
8 April	Singapore Open (Draw): Host: Singapore; Venue: Singapore Indoor Stadium; Level: Super 500; Prize: $355,000; Format: 32MS/32WS/32MD/32WD/32XD	Score: 21–14, 21–6	
8 April	Vietnam International: Host: Hanoi, Vietnam; Venue: Tay Ho District Stadium; Level: International Challenge; Prize: $25,000; Format: 64MS/32WS/32MD/32WD/32XD	(Indonesia) Firman Abdul Kholik	(Indonesia) Chico Aura Dwi Wardoyo
8 April	Vietnam International: Host: Hanoi, Vietnam; Venue: Tay Ho District Stadium; Level: International Challenge; Prize: $25,000; Format: 64MS/32WS/32MD/32WD/32XD	Score: 21–16, 21–7	
8 April	Vietnam International: Host: Hanoi, Vietnam; Venue: Tay Ho District Stadium; Level: International Challenge; Prize: $25,000; Format: 64MS/32WS/32MD/32WD/32XD	(Japan) Hirari Mizui	(South Korea) An Se-young
8 April	Vietnam International: Host: Hanoi, Vietnam; Venue: Tay Ho District Stadium; Level: International Challenge; Prize: $25,000; Format: 64MS/32WS/32MD/32WD/32XD	Score: 21–19, 21–11	
8 April	Vietnam International: Host: Hanoi, Vietnam; Venue: Tay Ho District Stadium; Level: International Challenge; Prize: $25,000; Format: 64MS/32WS/32MD/32WD/32XD	(Indonesia) Kenas Adi Haryanto (Indonesia) Rian Agung Saputro	(South Korea) Kang Min-hyuk (South Korea) Kim Jae-hwan
8 April	Vietnam International: Host: Hanoi, Vietnam; Venue: Tay Ho District Stadium; Level: International Challenge; Prize: $25,000; Format: 64MS/32WS/32MD/32WD/32XD	Score: 21–19, 15–21, 21–18	
8 April	Vietnam International: Host: Hanoi, Vietnam; Venue: Tay Ho District Stadium; Level: International Challenge; Prize: $25,000; Format: 64MS/32WS/32MD/32WD/32XD	(Indonesia) Nita Violina Marwah (Indonesia) Putri Syaikah	(Chinese Taipei) Hsieh Pei-shan (Chinese Taipei) Lin Xiao-min
8 April	Vietnam International: Host: Hanoi, Vietnam; Venue: Tay Ho District Stadium; Level: International Challenge; Prize: $25,000; Format: 64MS/32WS/32MD/32WD/32XD	Score: 21–19, 21–16	
8 April	Vietnam International: Host: Hanoi, Vietnam; Venue: Tay Ho District Stadium; Level: International Challenge; Prize: $25,000; Format: 64MS/32WS/32MD/32WD/32XD	(Japan) Hiroki Midorikawa (Japan) Natsu Saito	(Thailand) Vichayapong Kanjanakeereewong (Thailand) Ruethaichanok Laisuan
8 April	Vietnam International: Host: Hanoi, Vietnam; Venue: Tay Ho District Stadium; Level: International Challenge; Prize: $25,000; Format: 64MS/32WS/32MD/32WD/32XD	Score: 21–16, 21–8	
8 April	Dutch International: Host: Wateringen, Netherlands; Venue: VELO Hall; Level: International Series; Prize: $10,000; Format: 32MS/32WS/32MD/32WD/32XD	(India) Harsheel Dani	(Denmark) Mads Christophersen
8 April	Dutch International: Host: Wateringen, Netherlands; Venue: VELO Hall; Level: International Series; Prize: $10,000; Format: 32MS/32WS/32MD/32WD/32XD	Score: 15–21, 21–12, 21–13	
8 April	Dutch International: Host: Wateringen, Netherlands; Venue: VELO Hall; Level: International Series; Prize: $10,000; Format: 32MS/32WS/32MD/32WD/32XD	(Denmark) Line Christophersen	(Spain) Clara Azurmendi
8 April	Dutch International: Host: Wateringen, Netherlands; Venue: VELO Hall; Level: International Series; Prize: $10,000; Format: 32MS/32WS/32MD/32WD/32XD	Score: 21–19, 21–14	
8 April	Dutch International: Host: Wateringen, Netherlands; Venue: VELO Hall; Level: International Series; Prize: $10,000; Format: 32MS/32WS/32MD/32WD/32XD	(Denmark) Daniel Lundgaard (Denmark) Mathias Thyrri	(New Zealand) Oliver Leydon-Davis (New Zealand) Abhinav Manota
8 April	Dutch International: Host: Wateringen, Netherlands; Venue: VELO Hall; Level: International Series; Prize: $10,000; Format: 32MS/32WS/32MD/32WD/32XD	Score: 21–16, 15–21, 21–14	
8 April	Dutch International: Host: Wateringen, Netherlands; Venue: VELO Hall; Level: International Series; Prize: $10,000; Format: 32MS/32WS/32MD/32WD/32XD	(Denmark) Amalie Magelund (Denmark) Freja Ravn	(Netherlands) Debora Jille (Netherlands) Alyssa Tirtosentono
8 April	Dutch International: Host: Wateringen, Netherlands; Venue: VELO Hall; Level: International Series; Prize: $10,000; Format: 32MS/32WS/32MD/32WD/32XD	Score: 22–24, 21–19, 21–11	
8 April	Dutch International: Host: Wateringen, Netherlands; Venue: VELO Hall; Level: International Series; Prize: $10,000; Format: 32MS/32WS/32MD/32WD/32XD	(Denmark) Mathias Thyrri (Denmark) Elisa Melgaard	(France) William Villeger (France) Vimala Hériau
8 April	Dutch International: Host: Wateringen, Netherlands; Venue: VELO Hall; Level: International Series; Prize: $10,000; Format: 32MS/32WS/32MD/32WD/32XD	Score: 21–14, 16–21, 21–12	
15 April	Croatian International: Host: Zagreb, Croatia; Venue: Dom Sportova; Level: Future Series; Prize: $500; Format: 32MS/32WS/32MD/32WD/32XD	(India) B. M. Rahul Bharadwaj	(Germany) Max Weißkirchen
15 April	Croatian International: Host: Zagreb, Croatia; Venue: Dom Sportova; Level: Future Series; Prize: $500; Format: 32MS/32WS/32MD/32WD/32XD	Score: 12–21, 22–20, 21–14	
15 April	Croatian International: Host: Zagreb, Croatia; Venue: Dom Sportova; Level: Future Series; Prize: $500; Format: 32MS/32WS/32MD/32WD/32XD	(Hungary) Laura Sárosi	(India) Tanvi Lad
15 April	Croatian International: Host: Zagreb, Croatia; Venue: Dom Sportova; Level: Future Series; Prize: $500; Format: 32MS/32WS/32MD/32WD/32XD	Score: 21–18, 21–13	
15 April	Croatian International: Host: Zagreb, Croatia; Venue: Dom Sportova; Level: Future Series; Prize: $500; Format: 32MS/32WS/32MD/32WD/32XD	(Denmark) Emil Lauritzen (Denmark) Mads Muurholm	(Denmark) Phillip Illum Klint (Denmark) Jakob Stage
15 April	Croatian International: Host: Zagreb, Croatia; Venue: Dom Sportova; Level: Future Series; Prize: $500; Format: 32MS/32WS/32MD/32WD/32XD	Score: Walkover	
15 April	Croatian International: Host: Zagreb, Croatia; Venue: Dom Sportova; Level: Future Series; Prize: $500; Format: 32MS/32WS/32MD/32WD/32XD	(Netherlands) Debora Jille (Netherlands) Alyssa Tirtosentono	(Ukraine) Hrystyna Dzhangobekova (Slovakia) Katarina Vargová
15 April	Croatian International: Host: Zagreb, Croatia; Venue: Dom Sportova; Level: Future Series; Prize: $500; Format: 32MS/32WS/32MD/32WD/32XD	Score: 21–13, 21–9	
15 April	Croatian International: Host: Zagreb, Croatia; Venue: Dom Sportova; Level: Future Series; Prize: $500; Format: 32MS/32WS/32MD/32WD/32XD	(Denmark) Emil Lauritzen (Denmark) Iben Bergstein	(Spain) Alberto Zapico (Spain) Lorena Uslé
15 April	Croatian International: Host: Zagreb, Croatia; Venue: Dom Sportova; Level: Future Series; Prize: $500; Format: 32MS/32WS/32MD/32WD/32XD	Score: 19–21, 21–12, 21–16	
22 April	Badminton Asia Championships (Draw): Host: Wuhan, China; Venue: Wuhan Sports Center; Level: Continental Championships; Prize: $400,000; Format: 32MS/32WS/32MD/32WD/32XD	(Japan) Kento Momota	(China) Shi Yuqi
22 April	Badminton Asia Championships (Draw): Host: Wuhan, China; Venue: Wuhan Sports Center; Level: Continental Championships; Prize: $400,000; Format: 32MS/32WS/32MD/32WD/32XD	Score: 12–21, 21–18, 21–8	
22 April	Badminton Asia Championships (Draw): Host: Wuhan, China; Venue: Wuhan Sports Center; Level: Continental Championships; Prize: $400,000; Format: 32MS/32WS/32MD/32WD/32XD	(Japan) Akane Yamaguchi	(China) He Bingjiao
22 April	Badminton Asia Championships (Draw): Host: Wuhan, China; Venue: Wuhan Sports Center; Level: Continental Championships; Prize: $400,000; Format: 32MS/32WS/32MD/32WD/32XD	Score: 21–19, 21–9	
22 April	Badminton Asia Championships (Draw): Host: Wuhan, China; Venue: Wuhan Sports Center; Level: Continental Championships; Prize: $400,000; Format: 32MS/32WS/32MD/32WD/32XD	(Japan) Hiroyuki Endo (Japan) Yuta Watanabe	(Indonesia) Marcus Fernaldi Gideon (Indonesia) Kevin Sanjaya Sukamuljo
22 April	Badminton Asia Championships (Draw): Host: Wuhan, China; Venue: Wuhan Sports Center; Level: Continental Championships; Prize: $400,000; Format: 32MS/32WS/32MD/32WD/32XD	Score: 21–18, 21–3	
22 April	Badminton Asia Championships (Draw): Host: Wuhan, China; Venue: Wuhan Sports Center; Level: Continental Championships; Prize: $400,000; Format: 32MS/32WS/32MD/32WD/32XD	(China) Chen Qingchen (China) Jia Yifan	(Japan) Mayu Matsumoto (Japan) Wakana Nagahara
22 April	Badminton Asia Championships (Draw): Host: Wuhan, China; Venue: Wuhan Sports Center; Level: Continental Championships; Prize: $400,000; Format: 32MS/32WS/32MD/32WD/32XD	Score: 19–21, 21–14, 21–19	
22 April	Badminton Asia Championships (Draw): Host: Wuhan, China; Venue: Wuhan Sports Center; Level: Continental Championships; Prize: $400,000; Format: 32MS/32WS/32MD/32WD/32XD	(China) Wang Yilü (China) Huang Dongping	(China) He Jiting (China) Du Yue
22 April	Badminton Asia Championships (Draw): Host: Wuhan, China; Venue: Wuhan Sports Center; Level: Continental Championships; Prize: $400,000; Format: 32MS/32WS/32MD/32WD/32XD	Score: 21–11, 13–21, 23–21	
22 April	Pan Am Badminton Championships (Draw): Host: Aguascalientes, Mexico; Venue: Gimnasio Olímpico de Ciudad Deportiva de Aguascalientes; Level: Continental Championships; Format: 64MS/64WS/32MD/16WD/32XD	(Cuba) Osleni Guerrero	(Guatemala) Kevin Cordón
22 April	Pan Am Badminton Championships (Draw): Host: Aguascalientes, Mexico; Venue: Gimnasio Olímpico de Ciudad Deportiva de Aguascalientes; Level: Continental Championships; Format: 64MS/64WS/32MD/16WD/32XD	Score: 21–11, 22–20	
22 April	Pan Am Badminton Championships (Draw): Host: Aguascalientes, Mexico; Venue: Gimnasio Olímpico de Ciudad Deportiva de Aguascalientes; Level: Continental Championships; Format: 64MS/64WS/32MD/16WD/32XD	(Canada) Michelle Li	(Canada) Brittney Tam
22 April	Pan Am Badminton Championships (Draw): Host: Aguascalientes, Mexico; Venue: Gimnasio Olímpico de Ciudad Deportiva de Aguascalientes; Level: Continental Championships; Format: 64MS/64WS/32MD/16WD/32XD	Score: 21–15, 24–22	
22 April	Pan Am Badminton Championships (Draw): Host: Aguascalientes, Mexico; Venue: Gimnasio Olímpico de Ciudad Deportiva de Aguascalientes; Level: Continental Championships; Format: 64MS/64WS/32MD/16WD/32XD	(Canada) Jason Ho-shue (Canada) Nyl Yakura	(Cuba) Osleni Guerrero (Cuba) Leodannis Martínez
22 April	Pan Am Badminton Championships (Draw): Host: Aguascalientes, Mexico; Venue: Gimnasio Olímpico de Ciudad Deportiva de Aguascalientes; Level: Continental Championships; Format: 64MS/64WS/32MD/16WD/32XD	Score: 21–11, 20–22, 21-10	
22 April	Pan Am Badminton Championships (Draw): Host: Aguascalientes, Mexico; Venue: Gimnasio Olímpico de Ciudad Deportiva de Aguascalientes; Level: Continental Championships; Format: 64MS/64WS/32MD/16WD/32XD	(Canada) Rachel Honderich (Canada) Kristen Tsai	(Canada) Catherine Choi (Canada) Josephine Wu
22 April	Pan Am Badminton Championships (Draw): Host: Aguascalientes, Mexico; Venue: Gimnasio Olímpico de Ciudad Deportiva de Aguascalientes; Level: Continental Championships; Format: 64MS/64WS/32MD/16WD/32XD	Score: 21–15, 27-25	
22 April	Pan Am Badminton Championships (Draw): Host: Aguascalientes, Mexico; Venue: Gimnasio Olímpico de Ciudad Deportiva de Aguascalientes; Level: Continental Championships; Format: 64MS/64WS/32MD/16WD/32XD	(Canada) Joshua Hurlburt-Yu (Canada) Josephine Wu	(Brazil) Fabricio Farias (Brazil) Jaqueline Lima
22 April	Pan Am Badminton Championships (Draw): Host: Aguascalientes, Mexico; Venue: Gimnasio Olímpico de Ciudad Deportiva de Aguascalientes; Level: Continental Championships; Format: 64MS/64WS/32MD/16WD/32XD	Score: 21–14, 21–19	
22 April	African Mixed Team Championships (Draw): Host: Port Harcourt, Nigeria; Venue: Alfred Diete-Spiff Sports Complex; Level: Continental Team Championships; Format: 13 teams (Round robin)	Nigeria	Mauritius
22 April	African Mixed Team Championships (Draw): Host: Port Harcourt, Nigeria; Venue: Alfred Diete-Spiff Sports Complex; Level: Continental Team Championships; Format: 13 teams (Round robin)	Anuoluwapo Juwon Opeyori; Uchechukwu Deborah Ukeh; Clement Krobakpo / Enejoh Abah; Uchechukwu Deborah Ukeh / Dorcas Ajoke Adesokan; Anuoluwapo Juwon Opeyori / Dorcas Ajoke Adesokan	Aatish Lubah; Kate Foo Kune; Aatish Lubah / Georges Paul; Aurelie Allet / Lorna Bodha; Georges Paul / Kate Foo Kune
22 April	African Mixed Team Championships (Draw): Host: Port Harcourt, Nigeria; Venue: Alfred Diete-Spiff Sports Complex; Level: Continental Team Championships; Format: 13 teams (Round robin)	Score: 3–2	
22 April	African Badminton Championships (Draw): Host: Port Harcourt, Nigeria; Venue: Alfred Diete-Spiff Sports Complex; Level: Continental Championships; Format: 64MS/64WS/32MD/32WD/64XD	(Nigeria) Anuoluwapo Juwon Opeyori	(Nigeria) Godwin Olofua
22 April	African Badminton Championships (Draw): Host: Port Harcourt, Nigeria; Venue: Alfred Diete-Spiff Sports Complex; Level: Continental Championships; Format: 64MS/64WS/32MD/32WD/64XD	Score: 21–17, 16–21, 21–17	
22 April	African Badminton Championships (Draw): Host: Port Harcourt, Nigeria; Venue: Alfred Diete-Spiff Sports Complex; Level: Continental Championships; Format: 64MS/64WS/32MD/32WD/64XD	(Nigeria) Dorcas Ajoke Adesokan	(Mauritius) Kate Foo Kune
22 April	African Badminton Championships (Draw): Host: Port Harcourt, Nigeria; Venue: Alfred Diete-Spiff Sports Complex; Level: Continental Championships; Format: 64MS/64WS/32MD/32WD/64XD	Score: 21–12, 21–13	
22 April	African Badminton Championships (Draw): Host: Port Harcourt, Nigeria; Venue: Alfred Diete-Spiff Sports Complex; Level: Continental Championships; Format: 64MS/64WS/32MD/32WD/64XD	(Algeria) Koceila Mammeri (Algeria) Youcef Sabri Medel	(Nigeria) Enejoh Abah (Nigeria) Isaac Minaphee
22 April	African Badminton Championships (Draw): Host: Port Harcourt, Nigeria; Venue: Alfred Diete-Spiff Sports Complex; Level: Continental Championships; Format: 64MS/64WS/32MD/32WD/64XD	Score: 21–18, 21–17	
22 April	African Badminton Championships (Draw): Host: Port Harcourt, Nigeria; Venue: Alfred Diete-Spiff Sports Complex; Level: Continental Championships; Format: 64MS/64WS/32MD/32WD/64XD	(Nigeria) Dorcas Ajoke Adesokan (Nigeria) Uchechukwu Deborah Ukeh	(Nigeria) Amin Yop Christopher (Nigeria) Chineye Ibere
22 April	African Badminton Championships (Draw): Host: Port Harcourt, Nigeria; Venue: Alfred Diete-Spiff Sports Complex; Level: Continental Championships; Format: 64MS/64WS/32MD/32WD/64XD	Score: 21–14, 20–22, 21–17	
22 April	African Badminton Championships (Draw): Host: Port Harcourt, Nigeria; Venue: Alfred Diete-Spiff Sports Complex; Level: Continental Championships; Format: 64MS/64WS/32MD/32WD/64XD	(Algeria) Koceila Mammeri (Algeria) Linda Mazri	(Nigeria) Enejoh Abah (Nigeria) Peace Orji
22 April	African Badminton Championships (Draw): Host: Port Harcourt, Nigeria; Venue: Alfred Diete-Spiff Sports Complex; Level: Continental Championships; Format: 64MS/64WS/32MD/32WD/64XD	Score: 15–21, 21–16, 21–18	
29 April	New Zealand Open (Draw): Host: Auckland, New Zealand; Venue: Eventfinda Stadium; Level: Super 300; Prize: $150,000; Format: 32MS/32WS/32MD/32WD/32XD	(Indonesia) Jonatan Christie	(Hong Kong) Ng Ka Long
29 April	New Zealand Open (Draw): Host: Auckland, New Zealand; Venue: Eventfinda Stadium; Level: Super 300; Prize: $150,000; Format: 32MS/32WS/32MD/32WD/32XD	Score: 21–12, 21–13	
29 April	New Zealand Open (Draw): Host: Auckland, New Zealand; Venue: Eventfinda Stadium; Level: Super 300; Prize: $150,000; Format: 32MS/32WS/32MD/32WD/32XD	(South Korea) An Se-young	(China) Li Xuerui
29 April	New Zealand Open (Draw): Host: Auckland, New Zealand; Venue: Eventfinda Stadium; Level: Super 300; Prize: $150,000; Format: 32MS/32WS/32MD/32WD/32XD	Score: 21–19, 21–15	
29 April	New Zealand Open (Draw): Host: Auckland, New Zealand; Venue: Eventfinda Stadium; Level: Super 300; Prize: $150,000; Format: 32MS/32WS/32MD/32WD/32XD	(Indonesia) Mohammad Ahsan (Indonesia) Hendra Setiawan	(Japan) Hiroyuki Endo (Japan) Yuta Watanabe
29 April	New Zealand Open (Draw): Host: Auckland, New Zealand; Venue: Eventfinda Stadium; Level: Super 300; Prize: $150,000; Format: 32MS/32WS/32MD/32WD/32XD	Score: 20–22, 21–15, 21–17	
29 April	New Zealand Open (Draw): Host: Auckland, New Zealand; Venue: Eventfinda Stadium; Level: Super 300; Prize: $150,000; Format: 32MS/32WS/32MD/32WD/32XD	(South Korea) Kim So-yeong (South Korea) Kong Hee-yong	(Japan) Misaki Matsutomo (Japan) Ayaka Takahashi
29 April	New Zealand Open (Draw): Host: Auckland, New Zealand; Venue: Eventfinda Stadium; Level: Super 300; Prize: $150,000; Format: 32MS/32WS/32MD/32WD/32XD	Score: 21–15, 21–18	
29 April	New Zealand Open (Draw): Host: Auckland, New Zealand; Venue: Eventfinda Stadium; Level: Super 300; Prize: $150,000; Format: 32MS/32WS/32MD/32WD/32XD	(Malaysia) Chan Peng Soon (Malaysia) Goh Liu Ying	(Indonesia) Praveen Jordan (Indonesia) Melati Daeva Oktavianti
29 April	New Zealand Open (Draw): Host: Auckland, New Zealand; Venue: Eventfinda Stadium; Level: Super 300; Prize: $150,000; Format: 32MS/32WS/32MD/32WD/32XD	Score: 21–14, 16–21, 29–27	
29 April	Brazil International: Host: Campinas, São Paulo, Brazil; Venue: Fonte São Paulo; Level: International Challenge; Prize: $25,000; Format: 32MS/32WS/32MD/32WD/32XD	(Israel) Misha Zilberman	(Canada) Brian Yang
29 April	Brazil International: Host: Campinas, São Paulo, Brazil; Venue: Fonte São Paulo; Level: International Challenge; Prize: $25,000; Format: 32MS/32WS/32MD/32WD/32XD	Score: 21–17, 22–20	
29 April	Brazil International: Host: Campinas, São Paulo, Brazil; Venue: Fonte São Paulo; Level: International Challenge; Prize: $25,000; Format: 32MS/32WS/32MD/32WD/32XD	(Belgium) Lianne Tan	(Bulgaria) Linda Zetchiri
29 April	Brazil International: Host: Campinas, São Paulo, Brazil; Venue: Fonte São Paulo; Level: International Challenge; Prize: $25,000; Format: 32MS/32WS/32MD/32WD/32XD	Score: 17–21, 21–12, 13–4 Retired	
29 April	Brazil International: Host: Campinas, São Paulo, Brazil; Venue: Fonte São Paulo; Level: International Challenge; Prize: $25,000; Format: 32MS/32WS/32MD/32WD/32XD	(India) Satwiksairaj Rankireddy (India) Chirag Shetty	(Netherlands) Jelle Maas (Netherlands) Robin Tabeling
29 April	Brazil International: Host: Campinas, São Paulo, Brazil; Venue: Fonte São Paulo; Level: International Challenge; Prize: $25,000; Format: 32MS/32WS/32MD/32WD/32XD	Score: 21–14, 21–18	
29 April	Brazil International: Host: Campinas, São Paulo, Brazil; Venue: Fonte São Paulo; Level: International Challenge; Prize: $25,000; Format: 32MS/32WS/32MD/32WD/32XD	(Canada) Rachel Honderich (Canada) Kristen Tsai	(France) Émilie Lefel (France) Anne Tran
29 April	Brazil International: Host: Campinas, São Paulo, Brazil; Venue: Fonte São Paulo; Level: International Challenge; Prize: $25,000; Format: 32MS/32WS/32MD/32WD/32XD	Score: 21–18, 17–21, 21–19	
29 April	Brazil International: Host: Campinas, São Paulo, Brazil; Venue: Fonte São Paulo; Level: International Challenge; Prize: $25,000; Format: 32MS/32WS/32MD/32WD/32XD	(Netherlands) Robin Tabeling (Netherlands) Selena Piek	(Netherlands) Jacco Arends (Netherlands) Cheryl Seinen
29 April	Brazil International: Host: Campinas, São Paulo, Brazil; Venue: Fonte São Paulo; Level: International Challenge; Prize: $25,000; Format: 32MS/32WS/32MD/32WD/32XD	Score: 16–21, 23–21, 21–17	
29 April	Hellas International: Host: Thessaloniki, Greece; Venue: Mikra National Athletic Center; Level: Future Series; Format: 32MS/32WS/32MD/16WD/32XD	(Germany) Lars Schänzler	(Bulgaria) Dimitar Yanakiev
29 April	Hellas International: Host: Thessaloniki, Greece; Venue: Mikra National Athletic Center; Level: Future Series; Format: 32MS/32WS/32MD/16WD/32XD	Score: 14–21, 21–17, 21–19	
29 April	Hellas International: Host: Thessaloniki, Greece; Venue: Mikra National Athletic Center; Level: Future Series; Format: 32MS/32WS/32MD/16WD/32XD	(Bulgaria) Mariya Mitsova	(Austria) Katrin Neudolt
29 April	Hellas International: Host: Thessaloniki, Greece; Venue: Mikra National Athletic Center; Level: Future Series; Format: 32MS/32WS/32MD/16WD/32XD	Score: 21–16, 21–8	
29 April	Hellas International: Host: Thessaloniki, Greece; Venue: Mikra National Athletic Center; Level: Future Series; Format: 32MS/32WS/32MD/16WD/32XD	(Poland) Miłosz Bochat (Poland) Paweł Śmiłowski	(England) Zach Russ (England) Steven Stallwood
29 April	Hellas International: Host: Thessaloniki, Greece; Venue: Mikra National Athletic Center; Level: Future Series; Format: 32MS/32WS/32MD/16WD/32XD	Score: 21–19, 18–21, 21–11	
29 April	Hellas International: Host: Thessaloniki, Greece; Venue: Mikra National Athletic Center; Level: Future Series; Format: 32MS/32WS/32MD/16WD/32XD	(Turkey) Zehra Erdem (Turkey) İlayda Nur Özelgül	(Poland) Wiktoria Adamek (Poland) Wiktoria Dąbczyńska
29 April	Hellas International: Host: Thessaloniki, Greece; Venue: Mikra National Athletic Center; Level: Future Series; Format: 32MS/32WS/32MD/16WD/32XD	Score: 13–21, 21–12, 26–24	
29 April	Hellas International: Host: Thessaloniki, Greece; Venue: Mikra National Athletic Center; Level: Future Series; Format: 32MS/32WS/32MD/16WD/32XD	(Bulgaria) Alex Vlaar (Bulgaria) Mariya Mitsova	(Poland) Miłosz Bochat (Poland) Magdalena Świerczyńska
29 April	Hellas International: Host: Thessaloniki, Greece; Venue: Mikra National Athletic Center; Level: Future Series; Format: 32MS/32WS/32MD/16WD/32XD	Score: 10–21, 23–21, 21–17	

=== May ===
Week commencing	Tournament	Champions	Runners-up
May 6	Denmark International: Host: Farum, Denmark; Venue: Farum Arena; Level: International Challenge; Prize: $25,000; Format: 32MS/32WS/32MD/32WD/32XD	(Denmark) Hans-Kristian Vittinghus	(Germany) Kai Schäfer
May 6	Denmark International: Host: Farum, Denmark; Venue: Farum Arena; Level: International Challenge; Prize: $25,000; Format: 32MS/32WS/32MD/32WD/32XD	Score: 21–16, 21–18	
May 6	Denmark International: Host: Farum, Denmark; Venue: Farum Arena; Level: International Challenge; Prize: $25,000; Format: 32MS/32WS/32MD/32WD/32XD	(Denmark) Mia Blichfeldt	(Japan) Natsuki Oie
May 6	Denmark International: Host: Farum, Denmark; Venue: Farum Arena; Level: International Challenge; Prize: $25,000; Format: 32MS/32WS/32MD/32WD/32XD	Score: 21–18, 21–18	
May 6	Denmark International: Host: Farum, Denmark; Venue: Farum Arena; Level: International Challenge; Prize: $25,000; Format: 32MS/32WS/32MD/32WD/32XD	(Japan) Shohei Hoshino (Japan) Yujiro Nishikawa	(England) Ben Lane (England) Sean Vendy
May 6	Denmark International: Host: Farum, Denmark; Venue: Farum Arena; Level: International Challenge; Prize: $25,000; Format: 32MS/32WS/32MD/32WD/32XD	Score: 4–21, 22–20, 21–18	
May 6	Denmark International: Host: Farum, Denmark; Venue: Farum Arena; Level: International Challenge; Prize: $25,000; Format: 32MS/32WS/32MD/32WD/32XD	(Japan) Saori Ozaki (Japan) Akane Watanabe	(England) Chloe Birch (England) Lauren Smith
May 6	Denmark International: Host: Farum, Denmark; Venue: Farum Arena; Level: International Challenge; Prize: $25,000; Format: 32MS/32WS/32MD/32WD/32XD	Score: 21–13, 21–18	
May 6	Denmark International: Host: Farum, Denmark; Venue: Farum Arena; Level: International Challenge; Prize: $25,000; Format: 32MS/32WS/32MD/32WD/32XD	(France) Ronan Labar (France) Anne Tran	(France) Thom Gicquel (France) Delphine Delrue
May 6	Denmark International: Host: Farum, Denmark; Venue: Farum Arena; Level: International Challenge; Prize: $25,000; Format: 32MS/32WS/32MD/32WD/32XD	Score: 19–21, 21–18, 21–15	
May 6	Peru Future Series: Host: Lima, Peru; Venue: Centro de Alto Rendimiento Videna; Prize: $2,500; Level: Future Series; Format: 32MS/32WS/32MD/32WD/32XD	(Canada) B. R. Sankeerth	(Canada) Brian Yang
May 6	Peru Future Series: Host: Lima, Peru; Venue: Centro de Alto Rendimiento Videna; Prize: $2,500; Level: Future Series; Format: 32MS/32WS/32MD/32WD/32XD	Score: 12–21, 21–11, 21–19	
May 6	Peru Future Series: Host: Lima, Peru; Venue: Centro de Alto Rendimiento Videna; Prize: $2,500; Level: Future Series; Format: 32MS/32WS/32MD/32WD/32XD	(Cuba) Tahimara Oropeza	(Indonesia) Ghaida Nurul Ghaniyu
May 6	Peru Future Series: Host: Lima, Peru; Venue: Centro de Alto Rendimiento Videna; Prize: $2,500; Level: Future Series; Format: 32MS/32WS/32MD/32WD/32XD	Score: 19–21, 21–14, 29–27	
May 6	Peru Future Series: Host: Lima, Peru; Venue: Centro de Alto Rendimiento Videna; Prize: $2,500; Level: Future Series; Format: 32MS/32WS/32MD/32WD/32XD	(Cuba) Osleni Guerrero (Cuba) Leodannis Martínez	(Peru) Mario Cuba (Peru) Diego Mini
May 6	Peru Future Series: Host: Lima, Peru; Venue: Centro de Alto Rendimiento Videna; Prize: $2,500; Level: Future Series; Format: 32MS/32WS/32MD/32WD/32XD	Score: 21–14, 21–17	
May 6	Peru Future Series: Host: Lima, Peru; Venue: Centro de Alto Rendimiento Videna; Prize: $2,500; Level: Future Series; Format: 32MS/32WS/32MD/32WD/32XD	(Peru) Daniela Macías (Peru) Dánica Nishimura	(Guatemala) Diana Corleto (Guatemala) Nikté Sotomayor
May 6	Peru Future Series: Host: Lima, Peru; Venue: Centro de Alto Rendimiento Videna; Prize: $2,500; Level: Future Series; Format: 32MS/32WS/32MD/32WD/32XD	Score: 17–21, 21–5, 21–14	
May 6	Peru Future Series: Host: Lima, Peru; Venue: Centro de Alto Rendimiento Videna; Prize: $2,500; Level: Future Series; Format: 32MS/32WS/32MD/32WD/32XD	(United States) Vinson Chiu (United States) Breanna Chi	(Cuba) Osleni Guerrero (Cuba) Tahimara Oropeza
May 6	Peru Future Series: Host: Lima, Peru; Venue: Centro de Alto Rendimiento Videna; Prize: $2,500; Level: Future Series; Format: 32MS/32WS/32MD/32WD/32XD	Score: 22–20, 21–9	
May 13	Slovenian International: Host: Medvode, Slovenia; Venue: Medvode Sport Hall; Level: International Series; Prize: $10,000; Format: 32MS/32WS/32MD/16WD/32XD	(India) Sourabh Verma	(Japan) Minoru Koga
May 13	Slovenian International: Host: Medvode, Slovenia; Venue: Medvode Sport Hall; Level: International Series; Prize: $10,000; Format: 32MS/32WS/32MD/16WD/32XD	Score: 21–17, 21–12	
May 13	Slovenian International: Host: Medvode, Slovenia; Venue: Medvode Sport Hall; Level: International Series; Prize: $10,000; Format: 32MS/32WS/32MD/16WD/32XD	(Spain) Clara Azurmendi	(Denmark) Sofie Holmboe Dahl
May 13	Slovenian International: Host: Medvode, Slovenia; Venue: Medvode Sport Hall; Level: International Series; Prize: $10,000; Format: 32MS/32WS/32MD/16WD/32XD	Score: 14–21, 21–17, 21–18	
May 13	Slovenian International: Host: Medvode, Slovenia; Venue: Medvode Sport Hall; Level: International Series; Prize: $10,000; Format: 32MS/32WS/32MD/16WD/32XD	(Japan) Shohei Hoshino (Japan) Yujiro Nishikawa	(Poland) Adam Cwalina (Poland) Paweł Pietryja
May 13	Slovenian International: Host: Medvode, Slovenia; Venue: Medvode Sport Hall; Level: International Series; Prize: $10,000; Format: 32MS/32WS/32MD/16WD/32XD	Score: 21–9, 21–11	
May 13	Slovenian International: Host: Medvode, Slovenia; Venue: Medvode Sport Hall; Level: International Series; Prize: $10,000; Format: 32MS/32WS/32MD/16WD/32XD	(England) Jenny Moore (England) Victoria Williams	(India) Pooja Dandu (India) Sanjana Santosh
May 13	Slovenian International: Host: Medvode, Slovenia; Venue: Medvode Sport Hall; Level: International Series; Prize: $10,000; Format: 32MS/32WS/32MD/16WD/32XD	Score: 21–14, 22–20	
May 13	Slovenian International: Host: Medvode, Slovenia; Venue: Medvode Sport Hall; Level: International Series; Prize: $10,000; Format: 32MS/32WS/32MD/16WD/32XD	(England) Gregory Mairs (England) Victoria Williams	(Finland) Anton Kaisti (Finland) Inalotta Suutarinen
May 13	Slovenian International: Host: Medvode, Slovenia; Venue: Medvode Sport Hall; Level: International Series; Prize: $10,000; Format: 32MS/32WS/32MD/16WD/32XD	Score: 21–16, 21–17	
May 13	German International: Host: Bonn, Germany; Venue: Erwin-Kranz-Halle; Level: Future Series; Format: 32MS/32WS/32MD/32WD/32XD	(France) Arnaud Merklé	(Germany) Max Weißkirchen
May 13	German International: Host: Bonn, Germany; Venue: Erwin-Kranz-Halle; Level: Future Series; Format: 32MS/32WS/32MD/32WD/32XD	Score: 22–20, 21–12	
May 13	German International: Host: Bonn, Germany; Venue: Erwin-Kranz-Halle; Level: Future Series; Format: 32MS/32WS/32MD/32WD/32XD	(Germany) Nguyen Thuc Phuong	(Denmark) Iben Bergstein
May 13	German International: Host: Bonn, Germany; Venue: Erwin-Kranz-Halle; Level: Future Series; Format: 32MS/32WS/32MD/32WD/32XD	Score: 13–21, 22–20, 21–15	
May 13	German International: Host: Bonn, Germany; Venue: Erwin-Kranz-Halle; Level: Future Series; Format: 32MS/32WS/32MD/32WD/32XD	(Denmark) Philip Illum Klindt (Denmark) Mads Thøgersen	(Denmark) Emil Lauritzen (Denmark) Mads Muurholm
May 13	German International: Host: Bonn, Germany; Venue: Erwin-Kranz-Halle; Level: Future Series; Format: 32MS/32WS/32MD/32WD/32XD	Score: 21–18, 21–13	
May 13	German International: Host: Bonn, Germany; Venue: Erwin-Kranz-Halle; Level: Future Series; Format: 32MS/32WS/32MD/32WD/32XD	(Belgium) Lise Jaques (Belgium) Flore Vandenhoucke	(Germany) Leona Michalski (Germany) Nguyen Thuc Phuong
May 13	German International: Host: Bonn, Germany; Venue: Erwin-Kranz-Halle; Level: Future Series; Format: 32MS/32WS/32MD/32WD/32XD	Score: 22–20, 21–14	
May 13	German International: Host: Bonn, Germany; Venue: Erwin-Kranz-Halle; Level: Future Series; Format: 32MS/32WS/32MD/32WD/32XD	(Germany) Peter Lang (Germany) Hannah Pohl	(Denmark) Emil Lauritzen (Denmark) Iben Bergstein
May 13	German International: Host: Bonn, Germany; Venue: Erwin-Kranz-Halle; Level: Future Series; Format: 32MS/32WS/32MD/32WD/32XD	Score: 21–13, 21–15	
May 19	Sudirman Cup (Draw): Host: Nanning, China; Host: Guangxi Sports Center Gymnasium; Level: World Mixed Team Championships; Format: 31 teams	China	Japan
May 19	Sudirman Cup (Draw): Host: Nanning, China; Host: Guangxi Sports Center Gymnasium; Level: World Mixed Team Championships; Format: 31 teams	Li Junhui / Liu Yuchen; Chen Yufei; Shi Yuqi; Chen Qingchen / Jia Yifan; Zheng Siwei / Huang Yaqiong	Hiroyuki Endo / Yuta Watanabe; Akane Yamaguchi; Kento Momota; Mayu Matsumoto / Wakana Nagahara; Yuta Watanabe / Arisa Higashino
May 19	Sudirman Cup (Draw): Host: Nanning, China; Host: Guangxi Sports Center Gymnasium; Level: World Mixed Team Championships; Format: 31 teams	Score: 3–0	
May 27	Latvia International: Host: Jelgava, Latvia; Venue: Zemgale Olympic Centre; Level: Future Series; Format: 32MS/32WS/32MD/32WD/32XD	(Netherlands) Aram Mahmoud	(Denmark) Magnus Johannesen
May 27	Latvia International: Host: Jelgava, Latvia; Venue: Zemgale Olympic Centre; Level: Future Series; Format: 32MS/32WS/32MD/32WD/32XD	Score: 21–9, 21–19	
May 27	Latvia International: Host: Jelgava, Latvia; Venue: Zemgale Olympic Centre; Level: Future Series; Format: 32MS/32WS/32MD/32WD/32XD	(Wales) Jordan Hart	(Germany) Thuc Phuong Nguyen
May 27	Latvia International: Host: Jelgava, Latvia; Venue: Zemgale Olympic Centre; Level: Future Series; Format: 32MS/32WS/32MD/32WD/32XD	Score: 22–20, 21–18	
May 27	Latvia International: Host: Jelgava, Latvia; Venue: Zemgale Olympic Centre; Level: Future Series; Format: 32MS/32WS/32MD/32WD/32XD	(Denmark) Emil Lauritzen (Denmark) Mads Muurholm	(France) Eloi Adam (France) Samy Corvée
May 27	Latvia International: Host: Jelgava, Latvia; Venue: Zemgale Olympic Centre; Level: Future Series; Format: 32MS/32WS/32MD/32WD/32XD	Score: 21–19, 21–16	
May 27	Latvia International: Host: Jelgava, Latvia; Venue: Zemgale Olympic Centre; Level: Future Series; Format: 32MS/32WS/32MD/32WD/32XD	(Estonia) Kati-Kreet Marran (Estonia) Helina Rüütel	(Sweden) Edith Urell (Sweden) Cecilia Wang
May 27	Latvia International: Host: Jelgava, Latvia; Venue: Zemgale Olympic Centre; Level: Future Series; Format: 32MS/32WS/32MD/32WD/32XD	Score: 22–20, 21–9	
May 27	Latvia International: Host: Jelgava, Latvia; Venue: Zemgale Olympic Centre; Level: Future Series; Format: 32MS/32WS/32MD/32WD/32XD	(Poland) Paweł Śmiłowski (Poland) Wiktoria Adamek	(Germany) Peter Lang (Germany) Hannah Pohl
May 27	Latvia International: Host: Jelgava, Latvia; Venue: Zemgale Olympic Centre; Level: Future Series; Format: 32MS/32WS/32MD/32WD/32XD	Score: 21–16, 21–14	

=== June ===
Week commencing	Tournament	Champions	Runners-up
3 June	Australian Open (Draw): Host: Sydney, Australia; Venue: Quaycentre; Level: Super 300; Prize: $150,000; Format: 32MS/32WS/32MD/32WD/32XD	(Indonesia) Jonatan Christie	(Indonesia) Anthony Sinisuka Ginting
3 June	Australian Open (Draw): Host: Sydney, Australia; Venue: Quaycentre; Level: Super 300; Prize: $150,000; Format: 32MS/32WS/32MD/32WD/32XD	Score: 21–17, 13–21, 21–14	
3 June	Australian Open (Draw): Host: Sydney, Australia; Venue: Quaycentre; Level: Super 300; Prize: $150,000; Format: 32MS/32WS/32MD/32WD/32XD	(China) Chen Yufei	(Japan) Nozomi Okuhara
3 June	Australian Open (Draw): Host: Sydney, Australia; Venue: Quaycentre; Level: Super 300; Prize: $150,000; Format: 32MS/32WS/32MD/32WD/32XD	Score: 21–15, 21–3	
3 June	Australian Open (Draw): Host: Sydney, Australia; Venue: Quaycentre; Level: Super 300; Prize: $150,000; Format: 32MS/32WS/32MD/32WD/32XD	(South Korea) Ko Sung-hyun (South Korea) Shin Baek-cheol	(Japan) Takeshi Kamura (Japan) Keigo Sonoda
3 June	Australian Open (Draw): Host: Sydney, Australia; Venue: Quaycentre; Level: Super 300; Prize: $150,000; Format: 32MS/32WS/32MD/32WD/32XD	Score: 21–11, 21–17	
3 June	Australian Open (Draw): Host: Sydney, Australia; Venue: Quaycentre; Level: Super 300; Prize: $150,000; Format: 32MS/32WS/32MD/32WD/32XD	(Japan) Yuki Fukushima (Japan) Sayaka Hirota	(China) Chen Qingchen (China) Jia Yifan
3 June	Australian Open (Draw): Host: Sydney, Australia; Venue: Quaycentre; Level: Super 300; Prize: $150,000; Format: 32MS/32WS/32MD/32WD/32XD	Score: 21–10, 21–16	
3 June	Australian Open (Draw): Host: Sydney, Australia; Venue: Quaycentre; Level: Super 300; Prize: $150,000; Format: 32MS/32WS/32MD/32WD/32XD	(China) Wang Yilyu (China) Huang Dongping	(Indonesia) Praveen Jordan (Indonesia) Melati Daeva Oktavianti
3 June	Australian Open (Draw): Host: Sydney, Australia; Venue: Quaycentre; Level: Super 300; Prize: $150,000; Format: 32MS/32WS/32MD/32WD/32XD	Score: 21–15, 21–8	
3 June	Azerbaijan International: Host: Baku, Azerbaijan; Venue: Baku Sports Palace; Level: International Challenge; Prize: $25,000; Format: 32MS/32WS/32MD/32WD/32XD	(Denmark) Rasmus Gemke	(Sweden) Felix Burestedt
3 June	Azerbaijan International: Host: Baku, Azerbaijan; Venue: Baku Sports Palace; Level: International Challenge; Prize: $25,000; Format: 32MS/32WS/32MD/32WD/32XD	Score: 21–13, 21–12	
3 June	Azerbaijan International: Host: Baku, Azerbaijan; Venue: Baku Sports Palace; Level: International Challenge; Prize: $25,000; Format: 32MS/32WS/32MD/32WD/32XD	(Thailand) Phittayaporn Chaiwan	(Belgium) Lianne Tan
3 June	Azerbaijan International: Host: Baku, Azerbaijan; Venue: Baku Sports Palace; Level: International Challenge; Prize: $25,000; Format: 32MS/32WS/32MD/32WD/32XD	Score: 21–15, 21–16	
3 June	Azerbaijan International: Host: Baku, Azerbaijan; Venue: Baku Sports Palace; Level: International Challenge; Prize: $25,000; Format: 32MS/32WS/32MD/32WD/32XD	(Germany) Mark Lamsfuß (Germany) Marvin Emil Seidel	(England) Marcus Ellis (England) Chris Langridge
3 June	Azerbaijan International: Host: Baku, Azerbaijan; Venue: Baku Sports Palace; Level: International Challenge; Prize: $25,000; Format: 32MS/32WS/32MD/32WD/32XD	Score: 21–17, 23–21	
3 June	Azerbaijan International: Host: Baku, Azerbaijan; Venue: Baku Sports Palace; Level: International Challenge; Prize: $25,000; Format: 32MS/32WS/32MD/32WD/32XD	(England) Chloe Birch (England) Lauren Smith	(Russia) Ekaterina Bolotova (Russia) Alina Davletova
3 June	Azerbaijan International: Host: Baku, Azerbaijan; Venue: Baku Sports Palace; Level: International Challenge; Prize: $25,000; Format: 32MS/32WS/32MD/32WD/32XD	Score: 21–18, 21–12	
3 June	Azerbaijan International: Host: Baku, Azerbaijan; Venue: Baku Sports Palace; Level: International Challenge; Prize: $25,000; Format: 32MS/32WS/32MD/32WD/32XD	(France) Thom Gicquel (France) Delphine Delrue	(Germany) Mark Lamsfuß (Germany) Isabel Herttrich
3 June	Azerbaijan International: Host: Baku, Azerbaijan; Venue: Baku Sports Palace; Level: International Challenge; Prize: $25,000; Format: 32MS/32WS/32MD/32WD/32XD	Score: 9–21, 23–21, 21–15	
3 June	Lithuanian International: Host: Panevėžys, Lithuania; Venue: CIDO Arena; Level: Future Series; Format: 32MS/32WS/32MD/32WD/32XD	(Russia) Georgii Karpov	(Denmark) Jeppe Bruun
3 June	Lithuanian International: Host: Panevėžys, Lithuania; Venue: CIDO Arena; Level: Future Series; Format: 32MS/32WS/32MD/32WD/32XD	Score: 21–10, 21–19	
3 June	Lithuanian International: Host: Panevėžys, Lithuania; Venue: CIDO Arena; Level: Future Series; Format: 32MS/32WS/32MD/32WD/32XD	(France) Léonice Huet	(Scotland) Holly Newall
3 June	Lithuanian International: Host: Panevėžys, Lithuania; Venue: CIDO Arena; Level: Future Series; Format: 32MS/32WS/32MD/32WD/32XD	Score: 22–20, 21–10	
3 June	Lithuanian International: Host: Panevėžys, Lithuania; Venue: CIDO Arena; Level: Future Series; Format: 32MS/32WS/32MD/32WD/32XD	(Poland) Robert Cybulski (Poland) Paweł Pietryja	(Denmark) Emil Lauritzen (Denmark) Mads Muurholm
3 June	Lithuanian International: Host: Panevėžys, Lithuania; Venue: CIDO Arena; Level: Future Series; Format: 32MS/32WS/32MD/32WD/32XD	Score: 15–21, 21–19, 21–19	
3 June	Lithuanian International: Host: Panevėžys, Lithuania; Venue: CIDO Arena; Level: Future Series; Format: 32MS/32WS/32MD/32WD/32XD	(Netherlands) Debora Jille (Netherlands) Alyssa Tirtosentono	(Denmark) Christine Busch (Denmark) Amalie Schulz
3 June	Lithuanian International: Host: Panevėžys, Lithuania; Venue: CIDO Arena; Level: Future Series; Format: 32MS/32WS/32MD/32WD/32XD	Score: 21–18, 21–10	
3 June	Lithuanian International: Host: Panevėžys, Lithuania; Venue: CIDO Arena; Level: Future Series; Format: 32MS/32WS/32MD/32WD/32XD	(Netherlands) Ties van der Lecq (Netherlands) Debora Jille	(Russia) Georgii Karpov (Russia) Viktoriia Kozyreva
3 June	Lithuanian International: Host: Panevėžys, Lithuania; Venue: CIDO Arena; Level: Future Series; Format: 32MS/32WS/32MD/32WD/32XD	Score: 21–14, 23–21	
10 June	Spanish International: Host: Madrid, Spain; Venue: Polideportivo Municipal 'Marqués de Samarach'; Level: International Challenge; Prize: $25,000; Format: 32MS/32WS/32MD/32WD/32XD	(Thailand) Kunlavut Vitidsarn	(England) Toby Penty
10 June	Spanish International: Host: Madrid, Spain; Venue: Polideportivo Municipal 'Marqués de Samarach'; Level: International Challenge; Prize: $25,000; Format: 32MS/32WS/32MD/32WD/32XD	Score: 21–14, 21–14	
10 June	Spanish International: Host: Madrid, Spain; Venue: Polideportivo Municipal 'Marqués de Samarach'; Level: International Challenge; Prize: $25,000; Format: 32MS/32WS/32MD/32WD/32XD	(Thailand) Phittayaporn Chaiwan	(Scotland) Kirsty Gilmour
10 June	Spanish International: Host: Madrid, Spain; Venue: Polideportivo Municipal 'Marqués de Samarach'; Level: International Challenge; Prize: $25,000; Format: 32MS/32WS/32MD/32WD/32XD	Score: 21–12, 21–15	
10 June	Spanish International: Host: Madrid, Spain; Venue: Polideportivo Municipal 'Marqués de Samarach'; Level: International Challenge; Prize: $25,000; Format: 32MS/32WS/32MD/32WD/32XD	(Denmark) Mathias Boe (Denmark) Mads Conrad-Petersen	(Denmark) Joel Eipe (Denmark) Rasmus Kjær
10 June	Spanish International: Host: Madrid, Spain; Venue: Polideportivo Municipal 'Marqués de Samarach'; Level: International Challenge; Prize: $25,000; Format: 32MS/32WS/32MD/32WD/32XD	Score: 21–11, 21–10	
10 June	Spanish International: Host: Madrid, Spain; Venue: Polideportivo Municipal 'Marqués de Samarach'; Level: International Challenge; Prize: $25,000; Format: 32MS/32WS/32MD/32WD/32XD	(Bulgaria) Gabriela Stoeva (Bulgaria) Stefani Stoeva	(France) Émilie Lefel (France) Anne Tran
10 June	Spanish International: Host: Madrid, Spain; Venue: Polideportivo Municipal 'Marqués de Samarach'; Level: International Challenge; Prize: $25,000; Format: 32MS/32WS/32MD/32WD/32XD	Score: 21–8, 21–10	
10 June	Spanish International: Host: Madrid, Spain; Venue: Polideportivo Municipal 'Marqués de Samarach'; Level: International Challenge; Prize: $25,000; Format: 32MS/32WS/32MD/32WD/32XD	(England) Ben Lane (England) Jessica Pugh	(Denmark) Mathias Bay-Smidt (Denmark) Rikke Søby Hansen
10 June	Spanish International: Host: Madrid, Spain; Venue: Polideportivo Municipal 'Marqués de Samarach'; Level: International Challenge; Prize: $25,000; Format: 32MS/32WS/32MD/32WD/32XD	Score: 21–13, 24–26, 21–18	
10 June	Mauritius International: Host: Quatre Bornes, Mauritius; Venue: Navin Soonarane Gymnasium; Level: International Series; Prize: $10,000; Format: 32MS/32WS/32MD/16WD/32XD	(Malaysia) Goh Giap Chin	(Switzerland) Christian Kirchmayr
10 June	Mauritius International: Host: Quatre Bornes, Mauritius; Venue: Navin Soonarane Gymnasium; Level: International Series; Prize: $10,000; Format: 32MS/32WS/32MD/16WD/32XD	Score: 21–17, 21–17	
10 June	Mauritius International: Host: Quatre Bornes, Mauritius; Venue: Navin Soonarane Gymnasium; Level: International Series; Prize: $10,000; Format: 32MS/32WS/32MD/16WD/32XD	(Myanmar) Thet Htar Thuzar	(Finland) Airi Mikkelä
10 June	Mauritius International: Host: Quatre Bornes, Mauritius; Venue: Navin Soonarane Gymnasium; Level: International Series; Prize: $10,000; Format: 32MS/32WS/32MD/16WD/32XD	Score: 21–10, 21–19	
10 June	Mauritius International: Host: Quatre Bornes, Mauritius; Venue: Navin Soonarane Gymnasium; Level: International Series; Prize: $10,000; Format: 32MS/32WS/32MD/16WD/32XD	(Malaysia) Boon Xin Yuan (Malaysia) Yap Qar Siong	(Egypt) Adham Hatem Elgamal (Egypt) Ahmed Salah
10 June	Mauritius International: Host: Quatre Bornes, Mauritius; Venue: Navin Soonarane Gymnasium; Level: International Series; Prize: $10,000; Format: 32MS/32WS/32MD/16WD/32XD	Score: 21–16, 21–18	
10 June	Mauritius International: Host: Quatre Bornes, Mauritius; Venue: Navin Soonarane Gymnasium; Level: International Series; Prize: $10,000; Format: 32MS/32WS/32MD/16WD/32XD	(Malaysia) Kasturi Radhakrishnan (Malaysia) Venosha Radhakrishnan	(Mauritius) Aurélie Allet (Mauritius) Kobita Dookhee
10 June	Mauritius International: Host: Quatre Bornes, Mauritius; Venue: Navin Soonarane Gymnasium; Level: International Series; Prize: $10,000; Format: 32MS/32WS/32MD/16WD/32XD	Score: 21–14, 21–14	
10 June	Mauritius International: Host: Quatre Bornes, Mauritius; Venue: Navin Soonarane Gymnasium; Level: International Series; Prize: $10,000; Format: 32MS/32WS/32MD/16WD/32XD	(United States) Vinson Chiu (United States) Breanna Chi	(United States) Howard Shu (United States) Paula Lynn Obañana
10 June	Mauritius International: Host: Quatre Bornes, Mauritius; Venue: Navin Soonarane Gymnasium; Level: International Series; Prize: $10,000; Format: 32MS/32WS/32MD/16WD/32XD	Score: 21–17, 21–16	
17 June	Malaysia International Series: Host: Ipoh, Malaysia; Venue: Arena Badminton Perak; Level: International Series; Prize: $10,000; Format: 64MS/64WS/32MD/32WD/32XD	(Malaysia) Soong Joo Ven	(Malaysia) Cheam June Wei
17 June	Malaysia International Series: Host: Ipoh, Malaysia; Venue: Arena Badminton Perak; Level: International Series; Prize: $10,000; Format: 64MS/64WS/32MD/32WD/32XD	Score: 21–13, 22–20	
17 June	Malaysia International Series: Host: Ipoh, Malaysia; Venue: Arena Badminton Perak; Level: International Series; Prize: $10,000; Format: 64MS/64WS/32MD/32WD/32XD	(Indonesia) Sri Fatmawati	(Malaysia) Eoon Qi Xuan
17 June	Malaysia International Series: Host: Ipoh, Malaysia; Venue: Arena Badminton Perak; Level: International Series; Prize: $10,000; Format: 64MS/64WS/32MD/32WD/32XD	Score: 21–19, 21–8	
17 June	Malaysia International Series: Host: Ipoh, Malaysia; Venue: Arena Badminton Perak; Level: International Series; Prize: $10,000; Format: 64MS/64WS/32MD/32WD/32XD	(Indonesia) Leo Rolly Carnando (Indonesia) Daniel Marthin	(Malaysia) Low Hang Yee (Malaysia) Ng Eng Cheong
17 June	Malaysia International Series: Host: Ipoh, Malaysia; Venue: Arena Badminton Perak; Level: International Series; Prize: $10,000; Format: 64MS/64WS/32MD/32WD/32XD	Score: 17–21, 21–17, 21–11	
17 June	Malaysia International Series: Host: Ipoh, Malaysia; Venue: Arena Badminton Perak; Level: International Series; Prize: $10,000; Format: 64MS/64WS/32MD/32WD/32XD	(Malaysia) Thinaah Muralitharan (Malaysia) Pearly Tan	(Indonesia) Febriana Dwipuji Kusuma (Indonesia) Ribka Sugiarto
17 June	Malaysia International Series: Host: Ipoh, Malaysia; Venue: Arena Badminton Perak; Level: International Series; Prize: $10,000; Format: 64MS/64WS/32MD/32WD/32XD	Score: 21–16, 11–21, 21–18	
17 June	Malaysia International Series: Host: Ipoh, Malaysia; Venue: Arena Badminton Perak; Level: International Series; Prize: $10,000; Format: 64MS/64WS/32MD/32WD/32XD	(Indonesia) Amri Syahnawi (Indonesia) Pia Zebadiah Bernadet	(Indonesia) Andika Ramadiansyah (Indonesia) Bunga Fitriani Romadhini
17 June	Malaysia International Series: Host: Ipoh, Malaysia; Venue: Arena Badminton Perak; Level: International Series; Prize: $10,000; Format: 64MS/64WS/32MD/32WD/32XD	Score: 21–15, 21–17	
17 June	Peru International: Host: Lima, Peru; Venue: Polideportivo 2 - CAR Videna; Level: International Series; Prize: $10,000; Format: 32MS/32WS/32MD/16WD/32XD	(Canada) Brian Yang	(Guatemala) Kevin Cordón
17 June	Peru International: Host: Lima, Peru; Venue: Polideportivo 2 - CAR Videna; Level: International Series; Prize: $10,000; Format: 32MS/32WS/32MD/16WD/32XD	Score: 15–21, 21–13, 21–12	
17 June	Peru International: Host: Lima, Peru; Venue: Polideportivo 2 - CAR Videna; Level: International Series; Prize: $10,000; Format: 32MS/32WS/32MD/16WD/32XD	(Indonesia) Ghaida Nurul Ghaniyu	(Cuba) Tahimara Oropeza
17 June	Peru International: Host: Lima, Peru; Venue: Polideportivo 2 - CAR Videna; Level: International Series; Prize: $10,000; Format: 32MS/32WS/32MD/16WD/32XD	Score: 21–14, 21–14	
17 June	Peru International: Host: Lima, Peru; Venue: Polideportivo 2 - CAR Videna; Level: International Series; Prize: $10,000; Format: 32MS/32WS/32MD/16WD/32XD	(Guatemala) Rubén Castellanos (Guatemala) Aníbal Marroquín	(Brazil) Fabricio Farias (Brazil) Francielton Farias
17 June	Peru International: Host: Lima, Peru; Venue: Polideportivo 2 - CAR Videna; Level: International Series; Prize: $10,000; Format: 32MS/32WS/32MD/16WD/32XD	Score: 22–20, 21–17	
17 June	Peru International: Host: Lima, Peru; Venue: Polideportivo 2 - CAR Videna; Level: International Series; Prize: $10,000; Format: 32MS/32WS/32MD/16WD/32XD	(Guatemala) Diana Corleto (Guatemala) Nikté Sotomayor	(Brazil) Jaqueline Lima (Brazil) Sâmia Lima
17 June	Peru International: Host: Lima, Peru; Venue: Polideportivo 2 - CAR Videna; Level: International Series; Prize: $10,000; Format: 32MS/32WS/32MD/16WD/32XD	Score: 21–15, 21–16	
17 June	Peru International: Host: Lima, Peru; Venue: Polideportivo 2 - CAR Videna; Level: International Series; Prize: $10,000; Format: 32MS/32WS/32MD/16WD/32XD	(United States) Howard Shu (United States) Paula Lynn Obañana	(Brazil) Fabricio Farias (Brazil) Jaqueline Lima
17 June	Peru International: Host: Lima, Peru; Venue: Polideportivo 2 - CAR Videna; Level: International Series; Prize: $10,000; Format: 32MS/32WS/32MD/16WD/32XD	Score: 21–17, 22–20	
24 June	European Games (Draw): Host: Minsk, Belarus; Venue: Falcon Club; Level: Continental Championships; Format: 32MS/32WS/16MD/16WD/16XD	(Denmark) Anders Antonsen	(France) Brice Leverdez
24 June	European Games (Draw): Host: Minsk, Belarus; Venue: Falcon Club; Level: Continental Championships; Format: 32MS/32WS/16MD/16WD/16XD	Score: 21–19, 14–21, 21–10	
24 June	European Games (Draw): Host: Minsk, Belarus; Venue: Falcon Club; Level: Continental Championships; Format: 32MS/32WS/16MD/16WD/16XD	(Denmark) Mia Blichfeldt	(United Kingdom) Kirsty Gilmour
24 June	European Games (Draw): Host: Minsk, Belarus; Venue: Falcon Club; Level: Continental Championships; Format: 32MS/32WS/16MD/16WD/16XD	Score: 21–16, 21–17	
24 June	European Games (Draw): Host: Minsk, Belarus; Venue: Falcon Club; Level: Continental Championships; Format: 32MS/32WS/16MD/16WD/16XD	(United Kingdom) Marcus Ellis (United Kingdom) Chris Langridge	(Denmark) Kim Astrup (Denmark) Anders Skaarup Rasmussen
24 June	European Games (Draw): Host: Minsk, Belarus; Venue: Falcon Club; Level: Continental Championships; Format: 32MS/32WS/16MD/16WD/16XD	Score: 21–17, 21–10	
24 June	European Games (Draw): Host: Minsk, Belarus; Venue: Falcon Club; Level: Continental Championships; Format: 32MS/32WS/16MD/16WD/16XD	(Netherlands) Selena Piek (Netherlands) Cheryl Seinen	(United Kingdom) Chloe Birch (United Kingdom) Lauren Smith
24 June	European Games (Draw): Host: Minsk, Belarus; Venue: Falcon Club; Level: Continental Championships; Format: 32MS/32WS/16MD/16WD/16XD	Score: 14–21, 21–13, 21–15	
24 June	European Games (Draw): Host: Minsk, Belarus; Venue: Falcon Club; Level: Continental Championships; Format: 32MS/32WS/16MD/16WD/16XD	(United Kingdom) Marcus Ellis (United Kingdom) Lauren Smith	(United Kingdom) Chris Adcock (United Kingdom) Gabby Adcock
24 June	European Games (Draw): Host: Minsk, Belarus; Venue: Falcon Club; Level: Continental Championships; Format: 32MS/32WS/16MD/16WD/16XD	Score: 21–14, 21–9	
24 June	Mongolia International: Host: Ulaanbaatar, Mongolia; Venue: National Sports Center; Level: International Challenge; Prize: $25,000; Format: 32MS/32WS/32MD/16WD/32XD	(Japan) Kodai Naraoka	(Thailand) Kunlavut Vitidsarn
24 June	Mongolia International: Host: Ulaanbaatar, Mongolia; Venue: National Sports Center; Level: International Challenge; Prize: $25,000; Format: 32MS/32WS/32MD/16WD/32XD	Score: 9–21, 21–17, 23–21	
24 June	Mongolia International: Host: Ulaanbaatar, Mongolia; Venue: National Sports Center; Level: International Challenge; Prize: $25,000; Format: 32MS/32WS/32MD/16WD/32XD	(Thailand) Supanida Katethong	(South Korea) Sim Yu-jin
24 June	Mongolia International: Host: Ulaanbaatar, Mongolia; Venue: National Sports Center; Level: International Challenge; Prize: $25,000; Format: 32MS/32WS/32MD/16WD/32XD	Score: 21–19, 19–21, 21–9	
24 June	Mongolia International: Host: Ulaanbaatar, Mongolia; Venue: National Sports Center; Level: International Challenge; Prize: $25,000; Format: 32MS/32WS/32MD/16WD/32XD	(South Korea) Kim Won-ho (South Korea) Park Kyung-hoon	(South Korea) Kang Min-hyuk (South Korea) Kim Jae-hwan
24 June	Mongolia International: Host: Ulaanbaatar, Mongolia; Venue: National Sports Center; Level: International Challenge; Prize: $25,000; Format: 32MS/32WS/32MD/16WD/32XD	Score: 14–21, 29–27, 21–14	
24 June	Mongolia International: Host: Ulaanbaatar, Mongolia; Venue: National Sports Center; Level: International Challenge; Prize: $25,000; Format: 32MS/32WS/32MD/16WD/32XD	(Singapore) Shinta Mulia Sari (Singapore) Crystal Wong	(South Korea) Jang Eun-seo (South Korea) Jeong Na-eun
24 June	Mongolia International: Host: Ulaanbaatar, Mongolia; Venue: National Sports Center; Level: International Challenge; Prize: $25,000; Format: 32MS/32WS/32MD/16WD/32XD	Score: 15–21, 21–19, 21–18	
24 June	Mongolia International: Host: Ulaanbaatar, Mongolia; Venue: National Sports Center; Level: International Challenge; Prize: $25,000; Format: 32MS/32WS/32MD/16WD/32XD	(Hong Kong) Mak Hee Chun (Hong Kong) Chau Hoi Wah	(Thailand) Ratchapol Makkasasithorn (Thailand) Benyapa Aimsaard
24 June	Mongolia International: Host: Ulaanbaatar, Mongolia; Venue: National Sports Center; Level: International Challenge; Prize: $25,000; Format: 32MS/32WS/32MD/16WD/32XD	Score: 22–20, 21–15	
24 June	Benin International: Host: Cotonou, Benin; Venue: Stade de l'Amitié - Général Mathieu Kerekou; Level: International Series; Prize: $10,000; Format: 32MS/32WS/32MD/16WD/32XD	(Sri Lanka) Niluka Karunaratne	(Azerbaijan) Ade Resky Dwicahyo
24 June	Benin International: Host: Cotonou, Benin; Venue: Stade de l'Amitié - Général Mathieu Kerekou; Level: International Series; Prize: $10,000; Format: 32MS/32WS/32MD/16WD/32XD	Score: 23–21, 21–17	
24 June	Benin International: Host: Cotonou, Benin; Venue: Stade de l'Amitié - Général Mathieu Kerekou; Level: International Series; Prize: $10,000; Format: 32MS/32WS/32MD/16WD/32XD	(Myanmar) Thet Htar Thuzar	(Peru) Daniela Macías
24 June	Benin International: Host: Cotonou, Benin; Venue: Stade de l'Amitié - Général Mathieu Kerekou; Level: International Series; Prize: $10,000; Format: 32MS/32WS/32MD/16WD/32XD	Score: 17–21, 21–18, 21–14	
24 June	Benin International: Host: Cotonou, Benin; Venue: Stade de l'Amitié - Général Mathieu Kerekou; Level: International Series; Prize: $10,000; Format: 32MS/32WS/32MD/16WD/32XD	(Nigeria) Godwin Olofua (Nigeria) Anuoluwapo Juwon Opeyori	(India) Aravind Kongara (India) Venkatesh Prasad
24 June	Benin International: Host: Cotonou, Benin; Venue: Stade de l'Amitié - Général Mathieu Kerekou; Level: International Series; Prize: $10,000; Format: 32MS/32WS/32MD/16WD/32XD	Score: 21–19, 21–19	
24 June	Benin International: Host: Cotonou, Benin; Venue: Stade de l'Amitié - Général Mathieu Kerekou; Level: International Series; Prize: $10,000; Format: 32MS/32WS/32MD/16WD/32XD	(Peru) Daniela Macías (Peru) Dánica Nishimura	(Egypt) Doha Hany (Egypt) Hadia Hosny
24 June	Benin International: Host: Cotonou, Benin; Venue: Stade de l'Amitié - Général Mathieu Kerekou; Level: International Series; Prize: $10,000; Format: 32MS/32WS/32MD/16WD/32XD	Score: 21–19, 18–21, 21–12	
24 June	Benin International: Host: Cotonou, Benin; Venue: Stade de l'Amitié - Général Mathieu Kerekou; Level: International Series; Prize: $10,000; Format: 32MS/32WS/32MD/16WD/32XD	(United States) Howard Shu (United States) Paula Lynn Obañana	(Australia) Pit Seng Low (Australia) Louisa Ma
24 June	Benin International: Host: Cotonou, Benin; Venue: Stade de l'Amitié - Général Mathieu Kerekou; Level: International Series; Prize: $10,000; Format: 32MS/32WS/32MD/16WD/32XD	Score: 21–12, 21–13	
24 June	Mexico Future Series: Host: Guadalajara, Mexico; Venue: Code II Jalisco; Level: Future Series; Format: 32MS/32WS/16MD/16WD/32XD	(Cuba) Osleni Guerrero	(Mexico) Lino Muñoz
24 June	Mexico Future Series: Host: Guadalajara, Mexico; Venue: Code II Jalisco; Level: Future Series; Format: 32MS/32WS/16MD/16WD/32XD	Score: 20–22, 21–18, 21–15	
24 June	Mexico Future Series: Host: Guadalajara, Mexico; Venue: Code II Jalisco; Level: Future Series; Format: 32MS/32WS/16MD/16WD/32XD	(Cuba) Tahimara Oropeza	(Mexico) Mariana Ugalde
24 June	Mexico Future Series: Host: Guadalajara, Mexico; Venue: Code II Jalisco; Level: Future Series; Format: 32MS/32WS/16MD/16WD/32XD	Score: 21–9, 21–18	
24 June	Mexico Future Series: Host: Guadalajara, Mexico; Venue: Code II Jalisco; Level: Future Series; Format: 32MS/32WS/16MD/16WD/32XD	(Cuba) Osleni Guerrero (Cuba) Leodannis Martínez	(Mexico) Andrés López (Mexico) Luis Montoya
24 June	Mexico Future Series: Host: Guadalajara, Mexico; Venue: Code II Jalisco; Level: Future Series; Format: 32MS/32WS/16MD/16WD/32XD	Score: 21–13, 21–19	
24 June	Mexico Future Series: Host: Guadalajara, Mexico; Venue: Code II Jalisco; Level: Future Series; Format: 32MS/32WS/16MD/16WD/32XD	(Cuba) Tahimara Oropeza (Cuba) Yeily Ortiz	(Guatemala) Diana Corleto (Guatemala) Nikté Sotomayor
24 June	Mexico Future Series: Host: Guadalajara, Mexico; Venue: Code II Jalisco; Level: Future Series; Format: 32MS/32WS/16MD/16WD/32XD	Score: 21–13, 21–18	
24 June	Mexico Future Series: Host: Guadalajara, Mexico; Venue: Code II Jalisco; Level: Future Series; Format: 32MS/32WS/16MD/16WD/32XD	(Cuba) Osleni Guerrero (Cuba) Tahimara Oropeza	(Mexico) Luis Montoya (Mexico) Vanessa Villalobos
24 June	Mexico Future Series: Host: Guadalajara, Mexico; Venue: Code II Jalisco; Level: Future Series; Format: 32MS/32WS/16MD/16WD/32XD	Score: 22–20, 15–21, 21–16	

=== July ===
Week commencing	Tournament	Champions	Runners-up
1 July	Canada Open (Draw): Host: Calgary, Canada; Venue: Markin MacPhail Centre; Level: Super 100; Prize: $75,000; Format: 64MS/32WS/32MD/32WD/32XD	(China) Li Shifeng	(India) Parupalli Kashyap
1 July	Canada Open (Draw): Host: Calgary, Canada; Venue: Markin MacPhail Centre; Level: Super 100; Prize: $75,000; Format: 64MS/32WS/32MD/32WD/32XD	Score: 20–22, 21–14, 21–17	
1 July	Canada Open (Draw): Host: Calgary, Canada; Venue: Markin MacPhail Centre; Level: Super 100; Prize: $75,000; Format: 64MS/32WS/32MD/32WD/32XD	(South Korea) An Se-young	(China) Wang Zhiyi
1 July	Canada Open (Draw): Host: Calgary, Canada; Venue: Markin MacPhail Centre; Level: Super 100; Prize: $75,000; Format: 64MS/32WS/32MD/32WD/32XD	Score: 21–15, 22–20	
1 July	Canada Open (Draw): Host: Calgary, Canada; Venue: Markin MacPhail Centre; Level: Super 100; Prize: $75,000; Format: 64MS/32WS/32MD/32WD/32XD	(Denmark) Mathias Boe (Denmark) Mads Conrad-Petersen	(Japan) Hiroki Okamura (Japan) Masayuki Onodera
1 July	Canada Open (Draw): Host: Calgary, Canada; Venue: Markin MacPhail Centre; Level: Super 100; Prize: $75,000; Format: 64MS/32WS/32MD/32WD/32XD	Score: 21–12, 21–18	
1 July	Canada Open (Draw): Host: Calgary, Canada; Venue: Markin MacPhail Centre; Level: Super 100; Prize: $75,000; Format: 64MS/32WS/32MD/32WD/32XD	(Australia) Setyana Mapasa (Australia) Gronya Somerville	(South Korea) Chang Ye-na (South Korea) Kim Hye-rin
1 July	Canada Open (Draw): Host: Calgary, Canada; Venue: Markin MacPhail Centre; Level: Super 100; Prize: $75,000; Format: 64MS/32WS/32MD/32WD/32XD	Score: 21–16, 21–14	
1 July	Canada Open (Draw): Host: Calgary, Canada; Venue: Markin MacPhail Centre; Level: Super 100; Prize: $75,000; Format: 64MS/32WS/32MD/32WD/32XD	(South Korea) Ko Sung-hyun (South Korea) Eom Hye-won	(China) Guo Xinwa (China) Zhang Shuxian
1 July	Canada Open (Draw): Host: Calgary, Canada; Venue: Markin MacPhail Centre; Level: Super 100; Prize: $75,000; Format: 64MS/32WS/32MD/32WD/32XD	Score: 21–19, 21–19	
1 July	Côte d'Ivoire International: Host: Abidjan, Ivory Coast; Venue: Honore Zolobe; Level: International Series; Prize: $10,000; Format: 32MS/32WS/16MD/8WD/16XD	(India) Alap Mishra	(India) Chirag Sen
1 July	Côte d'Ivoire International: Host: Abidjan, Ivory Coast; Venue: Honore Zolobe; Level: International Series; Prize: $10,000; Format: 32MS/32WS/16MD/8WD/16XD	Score: 21–19, 21–19	
1 July	Côte d'Ivoire International: Host: Abidjan, Ivory Coast; Venue: Honore Zolobe; Level: International Series; Prize: $10,000; Format: 32MS/32WS/16MD/8WD/16XD	(Myanmar) Thet Htar Thuzar	(India) Sri Krishna Priya Kudaravalli
1 July	Côte d'Ivoire International: Host: Abidjan, Ivory Coast; Venue: Honore Zolobe; Level: International Series; Prize: $10,000; Format: 32MS/32WS/16MD/8WD/16XD	Score: 21–17, 21–13	
1 July	Côte d'Ivoire International: Host: Abidjan, Ivory Coast; Venue: Honore Zolobe; Level: International Series; Prize: $10,000; Format: 32MS/32WS/16MD/8WD/16XD	(Egypt) Adham Hatem Elgamal (Egypt) Ahmed Salah	(Nigeria) Godwin Olofua (Nigeria) Anuoluwapo Juwon Opeyori
1 July	Côte d'Ivoire International: Host: Abidjan, Ivory Coast; Venue: Honore Zolobe; Level: International Series; Prize: $10,000; Format: 32MS/32WS/16MD/8WD/16XD	Score: 22–20, 21–19	
1 July	Côte d'Ivoire International: Host: Abidjan, Ivory Coast; Venue: Honore Zolobe; Level: International Series; Prize: $10,000; Format: 32MS/32WS/16MD/8WD/16XD	(Iran) Samin Abedkhojasteh (Iran) Sorayya Aghaei	(Egypt) Doha Hany (Egypt) Hadia Hosny
1 July	Côte d'Ivoire International: Host: Abidjan, Ivory Coast; Venue: Honore Zolobe; Level: International Series; Prize: $10,000; Format: 32MS/32WS/16MD/8WD/16XD	Score: 22–20, 21–12	
1 July	Côte d'Ivoire International: Host: Abidjan, Ivory Coast; Venue: Honore Zolobe; Level: International Series; Prize: $10,000; Format: 32MS/32WS/16MD/8WD/16XD	(United States) Howard Shu (United States) Paula Lynn Obañana	(Egypt) Ahmed Salah (Egypt) Hadia Hosny
1 July	Côte d'Ivoire International: Host: Abidjan, Ivory Coast; Venue: Honore Zolobe; Level: International Series; Prize: $10,000; Format: 32MS/32WS/16MD/8WD/16XD	Score: 21–16, 21–14	
8 July	U.S. Open (Draw): Host: Fullerton, California, United States; Venue: Titan Gym; Level: Super 300; Prize: $150,000; Format: 32MS/32WS/32MD/32WD/32XD	(Chinese Taipei) Lin Chun-yi	(Thailand) Tanongsak Saensomboonsuk
8 July	U.S. Open (Draw): Host: Fullerton, California, United States; Venue: Titan Gym; Level: Super 300; Prize: $150,000; Format: 32MS/32WS/32MD/32WD/32XD	Score: 21–10, 21–13	
8 July	U.S. Open (Draw): Host: Fullerton, California, United States; Venue: Titan Gym; Level: Super 300; Prize: $150,000; Format: 32MS/32WS/32MD/32WD/32XD	(China) Wang Zhiyi	(South Korea) Kim Ga-eun
8 July	U.S. Open (Draw): Host: Fullerton, California, United States; Venue: Titan Gym; Level: Super 300; Prize: $150,000; Format: 32MS/32WS/32MD/32WD/32XD	Score: 21–18, 21–19	
8 July	U.S. Open (Draw): Host: Fullerton, California, United States; Venue: Titan Gym; Level: Super 300; Prize: $150,000; Format: 32MS/32WS/32MD/32WD/32XD	(South Korea) Ko Sung-hyun (South Korea) Shin Baek-cheol	(Chinese Taipei) Lee Yang (Chinese Taipei) Wang Chi-lin
8 July	U.S. Open (Draw): Host: Fullerton, California, United States; Venue: Titan Gym; Level: Super 300; Prize: $150,000; Format: 32MS/32WS/32MD/32WD/32XD	Score: 21–13, 17–21, 6–3 Retired	
8 July	U.S. Open (Draw): Host: Fullerton, California, United States; Venue: Titan Gym; Level: Super 300; Prize: $150,000; Format: 32MS/32WS/32MD/32WD/32XD	(Japan) Nami Matsuyama (Japan) Chiharu Shida	(South Korea) Baek Ha-na (South Korea) Jung Kyung-eun
8 July	U.S. Open (Draw): Host: Fullerton, California, United States; Venue: Titan Gym; Level: Super 300; Prize: $150,000; Format: 32MS/32WS/32MD/32WD/32XD	Score: 21–16, 21–16	
8 July	U.S. Open (Draw): Host: Fullerton, California, United States; Venue: Titan Gym; Level: Super 300; Prize: $150,000; Format: 32MS/32WS/32MD/32WD/32XD	(Chinese Taipei) Lee Jhe-huei (Chinese Taipei) Hsu Ya-ching	(France) Thom Gicquel (France) Delphine Delrue
8 July	U.S. Open (Draw): Host: Fullerton, California, United States; Venue: Titan Gym; Level: Super 300; Prize: $150,000; Format: 32MS/32WS/32MD/32WD/32XD	Score: 21–17, 21–17	
8 July	White Nights: Host: Gatchina, Russia; Venue: Arena; Level: International Challenge; Prize: $25,000; Format: 64MS/64WS/32MD/32WD/32XD	(Malaysia) Iskandar Zulkarnain Zainuddin	(India) Siddharth Pratap Singh
8 July	White Nights: Host: Gatchina, Russia; Venue: Arena; Level: International Challenge; Prize: $25,000; Format: 64MS/64WS/32MD/32WD/32XD	Score: 21–13, 21–16	
8 July	White Nights: Host: Gatchina, Russia; Venue: Arena; Level: International Challenge; Prize: $25,000; Format: 64MS/64WS/32MD/32WD/32XD	(Russia) Evgeniya Kosetskaya	(Japan) Yukino Nakai
8 July	White Nights: Host: Gatchina, Russia; Venue: Arena; Level: International Challenge; Prize: $25,000; Format: 64MS/64WS/32MD/32WD/32XD	Score: 22–24, 21–12, 21–12	
8 July	White Nights: Host: Gatchina, Russia; Venue: Arena; Level: International Challenge; Prize: $25,000; Format: 64MS/64WS/32MD/32WD/32XD	(Russia) Nikita Khakimov (Russia) Alexandr Zinchenko	(Russia) Vitalij Durkin (Russia) Nikolai Ukk
8 July	White Nights: Host: Gatchina, Russia; Venue: Arena; Level: International Challenge; Prize: $25,000; Format: 64MS/64WS/32MD/32WD/32XD	Score: 22–20, 21–16	
8 July	White Nights: Host: Gatchina, Russia; Venue: Arena; Level: International Challenge; Prize: $25,000; Format: 64MS/64WS/32MD/32WD/32XD	(Japan) Yukino Nakai (Japan) Nao Ono	(Japan) Minami Kawashima (Japan) Natsu Saito
8 July	White Nights: Host: Gatchina, Russia; Venue: Arena; Level: International Challenge; Prize: $25,000; Format: 64MS/64WS/32MD/32WD/32XD	Score: 18–21, 21–17, 21–13	
8 July	White Nights: Host: Gatchina, Russia; Venue: Arena; Level: International Challenge; Prize: $25,000; Format: 64MS/64WS/32MD/32WD/32XD	(Russia) Rodion Alimov (Russia) Alina Davletova	(Republic of Ireland) Sam Magee (Republic of Ireland) Chloe Magee
8 July	White Nights: Host: Gatchina, Russia; Venue: Arena; Level: International Challenge; Prize: $25,000; Format: 64MS/64WS/32MD/32WD/32XD	Score: 21–16, 13–21, 21–16	
15 July	Indonesia Open (Draw): Host: Jakarta, Indonesia; Venue: Istora Gelora Bung Karno; Level: Super 1000; Prize: $1,250,000; Format: 32MS/32WS/32MD/32WD/32XD	(Chinese Taipei) Chou Tien-chen	(Denmark) Anders Antonsen
15 July	Indonesia Open (Draw): Host: Jakarta, Indonesia; Venue: Istora Gelora Bung Karno; Level: Super 1000; Prize: $1,250,000; Format: 32MS/32WS/32MD/32WD/32XD	Score: 21–18, 24–26, 21–15	
15 July	Indonesia Open (Draw): Host: Jakarta, Indonesia; Venue: Istora Gelora Bung Karno; Level: Super 1000; Prize: $1,250,000; Format: 32MS/32WS/32MD/32WD/32XD	(Japan) Akane Yamaguchi	(India) P. V. Sindhu
15 July	Indonesia Open (Draw): Host: Jakarta, Indonesia; Venue: Istora Gelora Bung Karno; Level: Super 1000; Prize: $1,250,000; Format: 32MS/32WS/32MD/32WD/32XD	Score: 21–15, 21–16	
15 July	Indonesia Open (Draw): Host: Jakarta, Indonesia; Venue: Istora Gelora Bung Karno; Level: Super 1000; Prize: $1,250,000; Format: 32MS/32WS/32MD/32WD/32XD	(Indonesia) Marcus Fernaldi Gideon (Indonesia) Kevin Sanjaya Sukamuljo	(Indonesia) Mohammad Ahsan (Indonesia) Hendra Setiawan
15 July	Indonesia Open (Draw): Host: Jakarta, Indonesia; Venue: Istora Gelora Bung Karno; Level: Super 1000; Prize: $1,250,000; Format: 32MS/32WS/32MD/32WD/32XD	Score: 21–19, 21–16	
15 July	Indonesia Open (Draw): Host: Jakarta, Indonesia; Venue: Istora Gelora Bung Karno; Level: Super 1000; Prize: $1,250,000; Format: 32MS/32WS/32MD/32WD/32XD	(Japan) Yuki Fukushima (Japan) Sayaka Hirota	(Japan) Misaki Matsutomo (Japan) Ayaka Takahashi
15 July	Indonesia Open (Draw): Host: Jakarta, Indonesia; Venue: Istora Gelora Bung Karno; Level: Super 1000; Prize: $1,250,000; Format: 32MS/32WS/32MD/32WD/32XD	Score: 21–16, 21–18	
15 July	Indonesia Open (Draw): Host: Jakarta, Indonesia; Venue: Istora Gelora Bung Karno; Level: Super 1000; Prize: $1,250,000; Format: 32MS/32WS/32MD/32WD/32XD	(China) Zheng Siwei (China) Huang Yaqiong	(China) Wang Yilü (China) Huang Dongping
15 July	Indonesia Open (Draw): Host: Jakarta, Indonesia; Venue: Istora Gelora Bung Karno; Level: Super 1000; Prize: $1,250,000; Format: 32MS/32WS/32MD/32WD/32XD	Score: 21–13, 21–18	
15 July	Russian Open (Report): Host: Vladivostok, Russia; Venue: Sport Hall Olympic; Level: Super 100; Prize: $75,000; Format: 64MS/32WS/32MD/32WD/32XD	(Indonesia) Shesar Hiren Rhustavito	(Singapore) Loh Kean Yew
15 July	Russian Open (Report): Host: Vladivostok, Russia; Venue: Sport Hall Olympic; Level: Super 100; Prize: $75,000; Format: 64MS/32WS/32MD/32WD/32XD	Score: 21–17, 21–19	
15 July	Russian Open (Report): Host: Vladivostok, Russia; Venue: Sport Hall Olympic; Level: Super 100; Prize: $75,000; Format: 64MS/32WS/32MD/32WD/32XD	(Chinese Taipei) Pai Yu-po	(Scotland) Kirsty Gilmour
15 July	Russian Open (Report): Host: Vladivostok, Russia; Venue: Sport Hall Olympic; Level: Super 100; Prize: $75,000; Format: 64MS/32WS/32MD/32WD/32XD	Score: 9–21, 21–19, 21–19	
15 July	Russian Open (Report): Host: Vladivostok, Russia; Venue: Sport Hall Olympic; Level: Super 100; Prize: $75,000; Format: 64MS/32WS/32MD/32WD/32XD	(Denmark) Mathias Boe (Denmark) Mads Conrad-Petersen	(Japan) Keiichiro Matsui (Japan) Yoshinori Takeuchi
15 July	Russian Open (Report): Host: Vladivostok, Russia; Venue: Sport Hall Olympic; Level: Super 100; Prize: $75,000; Format: 64MS/32WS/32MD/32WD/32XD	Score: 21–18, 21–13	
15 July	Russian Open (Report): Host: Vladivostok, Russia; Venue: Sport Hall Olympic; Level: Super 100; Prize: $75,000; Format: 64MS/32WS/32MD/32WD/32XD	(Indonesia) Ni Ketut Mahadewi Istirani (Indonesia) Tania Oktaviani Kusumah	(Japan) Miki Kashihara (Japan) Miyuki Kato
15 July	Russian Open (Report): Host: Vladivostok, Russia; Venue: Sport Hall Olympic; Level: Super 100; Prize: $75,000; Format: 64MS/32WS/32MD/32WD/32XD	Score: 23–21, 21–16	
15 July	Russian Open (Report): Host: Vladivostok, Russia; Venue: Sport Hall Olympic; Level: Super 100; Prize: $75,000; Format: 64MS/32WS/32MD/32WD/32XD	(Indonesia) Adnan Maulana (Indonesia) Mychelle Crhystine Bandaso	(Russia) Evgenij Dremin (Russia) Evgenia Dimova
15 July	Russian Open (Report): Host: Vladivostok, Russia; Venue: Sport Hall Olympic; Level: Super 100; Prize: $75,000; Format: 64MS/32WS/32MD/32WD/32XD	Score: 19–21, 21–13, 21–15	
15 July	Silicon Valley International: Host: Newark, California, United States; Venue: Newark Event Center; Level: International Series; Prize: $10,000; Format: 32MS/32WS/16MD/8WD/16XD	(Canada) Xiaodong Sheng	(South Korea) Lee Sang-ho
15 July	Silicon Valley International: Host: Newark, California, United States; Venue: Newark Event Center; Level: International Series; Prize: $10,000; Format: 32MS/32WS/16MD/8WD/16XD	Score: 21–14, 21–11	
15 July	Silicon Valley International: Host: Newark, California, United States; Venue: Newark Event Center; Level: International Series; Prize: $10,000; Format: 32MS/32WS/16MD/8WD/16XD	(Japan) Natsuki Nidaira	(Japan) Mayu Sogo
15 July	Silicon Valley International: Host: Newark, California, United States; Venue: Newark Event Center; Level: International Series; Prize: $10,000; Format: 32MS/32WS/16MD/8WD/16XD	Score: 21–13, 21–12	
15 July	Silicon Valley International: Host: Newark, California, United States; Venue: Newark Event Center; Level: International Series; Prize: $10,000; Format: 32MS/32WS/16MD/8WD/16XD	(South Korea) Jung Tae-in (South Korea) Kim Young-hyuk	(South Korea) Kim Young-sun (South Korea) Shin Dong-beom
15 July	Silicon Valley International: Host: Newark, California, United States; Venue: Newark Event Center; Level: International Series; Prize: $10,000; Format: 32MS/32WS/16MD/8WD/16XD	Score: 18–21, 21–9, 21–13	
15 July	Silicon Valley International: Host: Newark, California, United States; Venue: Newark Event Center; Level: International Series; Prize: $10,000; Format: 32MS/32WS/16MD/8WD/16XD	(United States) Annie Xu (United States) Kerry Xu	(United States) Breanna Chi (United States) Jennie Gai
15 July	Silicon Valley International: Host: Newark, California, United States; Venue: Newark Event Center; Level: International Series; Prize: $10,000; Format: 32MS/32WS/16MD/8WD/16XD	Score: 21–14, 21–11	
15 July	Silicon Valley International: Host: Newark, California, United States; Venue: Newark Event Center; Level: International Series; Prize: $10,000; Format: 32MS/32WS/16MD/8WD/16XD	(South Korea) Kim Young-hyuk (South Korea) Park Sang-eun	(South Korea) Jung Tae-in (South Korea) Noh Yeon-lim
15 July	Silicon Valley International: Host: Newark, California, United States; Venue: Newark Event Center; Level: International Series; Prize: $10,000; Format: 32MS/32WS/16MD/8WD/16XD	Score: 21–18, 21–16	
15 July	Ghana International: Host: Accra, Ghana; Venue: SSNIT Emporium Sports Center; Level: International Series; Prize: $10,000; Format: 32MS/32WS/16MD/16WD/32XD	(India) Kiran George	(Azerbaijan) Ade Resky Dwicahyo
15 July	Ghana International: Host: Accra, Ghana; Venue: SSNIT Emporium Sports Center; Level: International Series; Prize: $10,000; Format: 32MS/32WS/16MD/16WD/32XD	Score: 25–23, 21–19	
15 July	Ghana International: Host: Accra, Ghana; Venue: SSNIT Emporium Sports Center; Level: International Series; Prize: $10,000; Format: 32MS/32WS/16MD/16WD/32XD	(Vietnam) Vũ Thị Trang	(India) Mugdha Agrey
15 July	Ghana International: Host: Accra, Ghana; Venue: SSNIT Emporium Sports Center; Level: International Series; Prize: $10,000; Format: 32MS/32WS/16MD/16WD/32XD	Score: 21–10, 21–6	
15 July	Ghana International: Host: Accra, Ghana; Venue: SSNIT Emporium Sports Center; Level: International Series; Prize: $10,000; Format: 32MS/32WS/16MD/16WD/32XD	(India) Arjun M.R. (India) Ramchandran Shlok	(Nigeria) Godwin Olofua (Nigeria) Anuoluwapo Juwon Opeyori
15 July	Ghana International: Host: Accra, Ghana; Venue: SSNIT Emporium Sports Center; Level: International Series; Prize: $10,000; Format: 32MS/32WS/16MD/16WD/32XD	Score: 21–11, 21–12	
15 July	Ghana International: Host: Accra, Ghana; Venue: SSNIT Emporium Sports Center; Level: International Series; Prize: $10,000; Format: 32MS/32WS/16MD/16WD/32XD	(India) K. Maneesha (India) Rutaparna Panda	(Nigeria) Dorcas Ajoke Adesokan (Nigeria) Uchechukwu Deborah Ukeh
15 July	Ghana International: Host: Accra, Ghana; Venue: SSNIT Emporium Sports Center; Level: International Series; Prize: $10,000; Format: 32MS/32WS/16MD/16WD/32XD	Score: 21–11, 21–11	
15 July	Ghana International: Host: Accra, Ghana; Venue: SSNIT Emporium Sports Center; Level: International Series; Prize: $10,000; Format: 32MS/32WS/16MD/16WD/32XD	(India) Ramchandran Shlok (India) Rutaparna Panda	(India) Arjun M.R. (India) K. Maneesha
15 July	Ghana International: Host: Accra, Ghana; Venue: SSNIT Emporium Sports Center; Level: International Series; Prize: $10,000; Format: 32MS/32WS/16MD/16WD/32XD	Score: 21–19, 21–15	
22 July	Japan Open (Draw): Host: Tokyo, Japan; Venue: Musashino Forest Sport Plaza; Level: Super 750; Prize: $700,000; Format: 32MS/32WS/32MD/32WD/32XD	(Japan) Kento Momota	(Indonesia) Jonatan Christie
22 July	Japan Open (Draw): Host: Tokyo, Japan; Venue: Musashino Forest Sport Plaza; Level: Super 750; Prize: $700,000; Format: 32MS/32WS/32MD/32WD/32XD	Score: 21–16, 21–13	
22 July	Japan Open (Draw): Host: Tokyo, Japan; Venue: Musashino Forest Sport Plaza; Level: Super 750; Prize: $700,000; Format: 32MS/32WS/32MD/32WD/32XD	(Japan) Akane Yamaguchi	(Japan) Nozomi Okuhara
22 July	Japan Open (Draw): Host: Tokyo, Japan; Venue: Musashino Forest Sport Plaza; Level: Super 750; Prize: $700,000; Format: 32MS/32WS/32MD/32WD/32XD	Score: 21–13, 21–15	
22 July	Japan Open (Draw): Host: Tokyo, Japan; Venue: Musashino Forest Sport Plaza; Level: Super 750; Prize: $700,000; Format: 32MS/32WS/32MD/32WD/32XD	(Indonesia) Marcus Fernaldi Gideon (Indonesia) Kevin Sanjaya Sukamuljo	(Indonesia) Mohammad Ahsan (Indonesia) Hendra Setiawan
22 July	Japan Open (Draw): Host: Tokyo, Japan; Venue: Musashino Forest Sport Plaza; Level: Super 750; Prize: $700,000; Format: 32MS/32WS/32MD/32WD/32XD	Score: 21–18, 23–21	
22 July	Japan Open (Draw): Host: Tokyo, Japan; Venue: Musashino Forest Sport Plaza; Level: Super 750; Prize: $700,000; Format: 32MS/32WS/32MD/32WD/32XD	(South Korea) Kim So-yeong (South Korea) Kong Hee-yong	(Japan) Mayu Matsumoto (Japan) Wakana Nagahara
22 July	Japan Open (Draw): Host: Tokyo, Japan; Venue: Musashino Forest Sport Plaza; Level: Super 750; Prize: $700,000; Format: 32MS/32WS/32MD/32WD/32XD	Score: 21–12, 21–12	
22 July	Japan Open (Draw): Host: Tokyo, Japan; Venue: Musashino Forest Sport Plaza; Level: Super 750; Prize: $700,000; Format: 32MS/32WS/32MD/32WD/32XD	(China) Wang Yilü (China) Huang Dongping	(Indonesia) Praveen Jordan (Indonesia) Melati Daeva Oktavianti
22 July	Japan Open (Draw): Host: Tokyo, Japan; Venue: Musashino Forest Sport Plaza; Level: Super 750; Prize: $700,000; Format: 32MS/32WS/32MD/32WD/32XD	Score: 21–17, 21–16	
22 July	Lagos International: Host: Lagos, Nigeria; Venue: Teslim Balogun Stadium; Level: International Challenge; Prize: $25,000; Format: 32MS/32WS/16MD/16WD/16XD	(Vietnam) Nguyễn Tiến Minh	(Israel) Misha Zilberman
22 July	Lagos International: Host: Lagos, Nigeria; Venue: Teslim Balogun Stadium; Level: International Challenge; Prize: $25,000; Format: 32MS/32WS/16MD/16WD/16XD	Score: 21–18, 25–23	
22 July	Lagos International: Host: Lagos, Nigeria; Venue: Teslim Balogun Stadium; Level: International Challenge; Prize: $25,000; Format: 32MS/32WS/16MD/16WD/16XD	(Turkey) Neslihan Yiğit	(Turkey) Özge Bayrak
22 July	Lagos International: Host: Lagos, Nigeria; Venue: Teslim Balogun Stadium; Level: International Challenge; Prize: $25,000; Format: 32MS/32WS/16MD/16WD/16XD	Score: 21–16, 24–26, 21–13	
22 July	Lagos International: Host: Lagos, Nigeria; Venue: Teslim Balogun Stadium; Level: International Challenge; Prize: $25,000; Format: 32MS/32WS/16MD/16WD/16XD	(Germany) Jones Ralfy Jansen (Germany) Peter Käsbauer	(India) Arjun M.R. (India) Ramchandran Shlok
22 July	Lagos International: Host: Lagos, Nigeria; Venue: Teslim Balogun Stadium; Level: International Challenge; Prize: $25,000; Format: 32MS/32WS/16MD/16WD/16XD	Score: 21–11, 21–8	
22 July	Lagos International: Host: Lagos, Nigeria; Venue: Teslim Balogun Stadium; Level: International Challenge; Prize: $25,000; Format: 32MS/32WS/16MD/16WD/16XD	(India) Pooja Dandu (India) Sanjana Santosh	(Turkey) Bengisu Erçetin (Turkey) Nazlıcan İnci
22 July	Lagos International: Host: Lagos, Nigeria; Venue: Teslim Balogun Stadium; Level: International Challenge; Prize: $25,000; Format: 32MS/32WS/16MD/16WD/16XD	Score: 21–18, 8–21, 21–14	
22 July	Lagos International: Host: Lagos, Nigeria; Venue: Teslim Balogun Stadium; Level: International Challenge; Prize: $25,000; Format: 32MS/32WS/16MD/16WD/16XD	(India) Arjun M.R. (India) K. Maneesha	(India) Ramchandran Shlok (India) Rutaparna Panda
22 July	Lagos International: Host: Lagos, Nigeria; Venue: Teslim Balogun Stadium; Level: International Challenge; Prize: $25,000; Format: 32MS/32WS/16MD/16WD/16XD	Score: 21–16, 21–17	
29 July	Thailand Open (Draw): Host: Bangkok, Thailand; Venue: Indoor Stadium Huamark; Level: Super 500; Prize: $350,000; Format: 32MS/32WS/32MD/32WD/32XD	(Chinese Taipei) Chou Tien-chen	(Hong Kong) Ng Ka Long
29 July	Thailand Open (Draw): Host: Bangkok, Thailand; Venue: Indoor Stadium Huamark; Level: Super 500; Prize: $350,000; Format: 32MS/32WS/32MD/32WD/32XD	Score: 21–14, 11–21, 23–21	
29 July	Thailand Open (Draw): Host: Bangkok, Thailand; Venue: Indoor Stadium Huamark; Level: Super 500; Prize: $350,000; Format: 32MS/32WS/32MD/32WD/32XD	(China) Chen Yufei	(Thailand) Ratchanok Intanon
29 July	Thailand Open (Draw): Host: Bangkok, Thailand; Venue: Indoor Stadium Huamark; Level: Super 500; Prize: $350,000; Format: 32MS/32WS/32MD/32WD/32XD	Score: 22–20, 21–18	
29 July	Thailand Open (Draw): Host: Bangkok, Thailand; Venue: Indoor Stadium Huamark; Level: Super 500; Prize: $350,000; Format: 32MS/32WS/32MD/32WD/32XD	(India) Satwiksairaj Rankireddy (India) Chirag Shetty	(China) Li Junhui (China) Liu Yuchen
29 July	Thailand Open (Draw): Host: Bangkok, Thailand; Venue: Indoor Stadium Huamark; Level: Super 500; Prize: $350,000; Format: 32MS/32WS/32MD/32WD/32XD	Score: 21–19, 18–21, 21–18	
29 July	Thailand Open (Draw): Host: Bangkok, Thailand; Venue: Indoor Stadium Huamark; Level: Super 500; Prize: $350,000; Format: 32MS/32WS/32MD/32WD/32XD	(Japan) Shiho Tanaka (Japan) Koharu Yonemoto	(China) Du Yue (China) Li Yinhui
29 July	Thailand Open (Draw): Host: Bangkok, Thailand; Venue: Indoor Stadium Huamark; Level: Super 500; Prize: $350,000; Format: 32MS/32WS/32MD/32WD/32XD	Score: 21–19, 14–21, 21–13	
29 July	Thailand Open (Draw): Host: Bangkok, Thailand; Venue: Indoor Stadium Huamark; Level: Super 500; Prize: $350,000; Format: 32MS/32WS/32MD/32WD/32XD	(China) Wang Yilü (China) Huang Dongping	(Japan) Yuta Watanabe (Japan) Arisa Higashino
29 July	Thailand Open (Draw): Host: Bangkok, Thailand; Venue: Indoor Stadium Huamark; Level: Super 500; Prize: $350,000; Format: 32MS/32WS/32MD/32WD/32XD	Score: 24–22, 23–21	
29 July	Pan American Games (Draw): Host: Lima, Peru; Venue: Polideportivo 3; Level: Continental Championships; Format: 64MS/64WS/16MD/16WD/32XD	(Brazil) Ygor Coelho de Oliveira	(Canada) Brian Yang
29 July	Pan American Games (Draw): Host: Lima, Peru; Venue: Polideportivo 3; Level: Continental Championships; Format: 64MS/64WS/16MD/16WD/32XD	Score: 21–19, 21–10	
29 July	Pan American Games (Draw): Host: Lima, Peru; Venue: Polideportivo 3; Level: Continental Championships; Format: 64MS/64WS/16MD/16WD/32XD	(Canada) Michelle Li	(Canada) Rachel Honderich
29 July	Pan American Games (Draw): Host: Lima, Peru; Venue: Polideportivo 3; Level: Continental Championships; Format: 64MS/64WS/16MD/16WD/32XD	Score: 21–11, 21–19	
29 July	Pan American Games (Draw): Host: Lima, Peru; Venue: Polideportivo 3; Level: Continental Championships; Format: 64MS/64WS/16MD/16WD/32XD	(Canada) Jason Ho-shue (Canada) Nyl Yakura	(United States) Phillip Chew (United States) Ryan Chew
29 July	Pan American Games (Draw): Host: Lima, Peru; Venue: Polideportivo 3; Level: Continental Championships; Format: 64MS/64WS/16MD/16WD/32XD	Score: 21–11, 19–21, 21–18	
29 July	Pan American Games (Draw): Host: Lima, Peru; Venue: Polideportivo 3; Level: Continental Championships; Format: 64MS/64WS/16MD/16WD/32XD	(Canada) Rachel Honderich (Canada) Kristen Tsai	(United States) Chen Kuei-Ya (United States) Jamie Hsu
29 July	Pan American Games (Draw): Host: Lima, Peru; Venue: Polideportivo 3; Level: Continental Championships; Format: 64MS/64WS/16MD/16WD/32XD	Score: 21–10, 21–9	
29 July	Pan American Games (Draw): Host: Lima, Peru; Venue: Polideportivo 3; Level: Continental Championships; Format: 64MS/64WS/16MD/16WD/32XD	(Canada) Joshua Hurlburt-Yu (Canada) Josephine Wu	(Canada) Nyl Yakura (Canada) Kristen Tsai
29 July	Pan American Games (Draw): Host: Lima, Peru; Venue: Polideportivo 3; Level: Continental Championships; Format: 64MS/64WS/16MD/16WD/32XD	Score: 18–21, 21–12, 21–15	

=== August ===
Week commencing	Tournament	Champions	Runners-up
5 August	Hyderabad Open (Draw): Host: Hyderabad, India; Venue: G. M. C. Balayogi SATS Indoor Stadium; Level: Super 100; Prize: $75,000; Format: 64MS/32WS/32MD/32WD/32XD	(India) Sourabh Verma	(Singapore) Loh Kean Yew
5 August	Hyderabad Open (Draw): Host: Hyderabad, India; Venue: G. M. C. Balayogi SATS Indoor Stadium; Level: Super 100; Prize: $75,000; Format: 64MS/32WS/32MD/32WD/32XD	Score: 21–13, 14–21, 21–16	
5 August	Hyderabad Open (Draw): Host: Hyderabad, India; Venue: G. M. C. Balayogi SATS Indoor Stadium; Level: Super 100; Prize: $75,000; Format: 64MS/32WS/32MD/32WD/32XD	(Singapore) Yeo Jia Min	(South Korea) An Se-young
5 August	Hyderabad Open (Draw): Host: Hyderabad, India; Venue: G. M. C. Balayogi SATS Indoor Stadium; Level: Super 100; Prize: $75,000; Format: 64MS/32WS/32MD/32WD/32XD	Score: 12–21, 21–17, 21–19	
5 August	Hyderabad Open (Draw): Host: Hyderabad, India; Venue: G. M. C. Balayogi SATS Indoor Stadium; Level: Super 100; Prize: $75,000; Format: 64MS/32WS/32MD/32WD/32XD	(Indonesia) Muhammad Shohibul Fikri (Indonesia) Bagas Maulana	(South Korea) Na Sung-seung (South Korea) Wang Chan
5 August	Hyderabad Open (Draw): Host: Hyderabad, India; Venue: G. M. C. Balayogi SATS Indoor Stadium; Level: Super 100; Prize: $75,000; Format: 64MS/32WS/32MD/32WD/32XD	Score: 21–18, 21–18	
5 August	Hyderabad Open (Draw): Host: Hyderabad, India; Venue: G. M. C. Balayogi SATS Indoor Stadium; Level: Super 100; Prize: $75,000; Format: 64MS/32WS/32MD/32WD/32XD	(South Korea) Baek Ha-na (South Korea) Jung Kyung-eun	(India) Ashwini Ponnappa (India) N. Sikki Reddy
5 August	Hyderabad Open (Draw): Host: Hyderabad, India; Venue: G. M. C. Balayogi SATS Indoor Stadium; Level: Super 100; Prize: $75,000; Format: 64MS/32WS/32MD/32WD/32XD	Score: 21–17, 21–17	
5 August	Hyderabad Open (Draw): Host: Hyderabad, India; Venue: G. M. C. Balayogi SATS Indoor Stadium; Level: Super 100; Prize: $75,000; Format: 64MS/32WS/32MD/32WD/32XD	(Malaysia) Hoo Pang Ron (Malaysia) Cheah Yee See	(Indonesia) Adnan Maulana (Indonesia) Mychelle Crhystine Bandaso
5 August	Hyderabad Open (Draw): Host: Hyderabad, India; Venue: G. M. C. Balayogi SATS Indoor Stadium; Level: Super 100; Prize: $75,000; Format: 64MS/32WS/32MD/32WD/32XD	Score: 16–21, 21–16, 21–11	
5 August	Hellas Open: Host: Sidirokastro, Greece; Venue: Sidirokastro Indoor Hall; Level: International Series; Prize: $10,000; Format: 32MS/32WS/32MD/16WD/32XD	(Malaysia) Lim Chong King	(Malaysia) Aidil Sholeh
5 August	Hellas Open: Host: Sidirokastro, Greece; Venue: Sidirokastro Indoor Hall; Level: International Series; Prize: $10,000; Format: 32MS/32WS/32MD/16WD/32XD	Score: 8–21, 21–13, 21–15	
5 August	Hellas Open: Host: Sidirokastro, Greece; Venue: Sidirokastro Indoor Hall; Level: International Series; Prize: $10,000; Format: 32MS/32WS/32MD/16WD/32XD	(Malaysia) Kisona Selvaduray	(Myanmar) Thet Htar Thuzar
5 August	Hellas Open: Host: Sidirokastro, Greece; Venue: Sidirokastro Indoor Hall; Level: International Series; Prize: $10,000; Format: 32MS/32WS/32MD/16WD/32XD	Score: 21–14, 21–9	
5 August	Hellas Open: Host: Sidirokastro, Greece; Venue: Sidirokastro Indoor Hall; Level: International Series; Prize: $10,000; Format: 32MS/32WS/32MD/16WD/32XD	(France) Eloi Adam (France) Julien Maio	(New Zealand) Oliver Leydon-Davis (New Zealand) Abhinav Manota
5 August	Hellas Open: Host: Sidirokastro, Greece; Venue: Sidirokastro Indoor Hall; Level: International Series; Prize: $10,000; Format: 32MS/32WS/32MD/16WD/32XD	Score: 21–18, 21–18	
5 August	Hellas Open: Host: Sidirokastro, Greece; Venue: Sidirokastro Indoor Hall; Level: International Series; Prize: $10,000; Format: 32MS/32WS/32MD/16WD/32XD	(France) Vimala Hériau (France) Margot Lambert	(Ukraine) Anastasiya Prozorova (Ukraine) Valeriya Rudakova
5 August	Hellas Open: Host: Sidirokastro, Greece; Venue: Sidirokastro Indoor Hall; Level: International Series; Prize: $10,000; Format: 32MS/32WS/32MD/16WD/32XD	Score: 21–13, 21–16	
5 August	Hellas Open: Host: Sidirokastro, Greece; Venue: Sidirokastro Indoor Hall; Level: International Series; Prize: $10,000; Format: 32MS/32WS/32MD/16WD/32XD	(France) Fabien Delrue (France) Vimala Hériau	(Poland) Paweł Śmiłowski (Poland) Magdalena Świerczyńska
5 August	Hellas Open: Host: Sidirokastro, Greece; Venue: Sidirokastro Indoor Hall; Level: International Series; Prize: $10,000; Format: 32MS/32WS/32MD/16WD/32XD	Score: 17–21, 21–19, 21–15	
12 August	Akita Masters (Draw): Host: Akita, Akita Prefecture, Japan; Venue: CNA Arena Akita; Level: Super 100; Prize: $75,000; Format: 64MS/32WS/32MD/32WD/32XD	(Indonesia) Firman Abdul Kholik	(Japan) Yu Igarashi
12 August	Akita Masters (Draw): Host: Akita, Akita Prefecture, Japan; Venue: CNA Arena Akita; Level: Super 100; Prize: $75,000; Format: 64MS/32WS/32MD/32WD/32XD	Score: 21–18, 22–20	
12 August	Akita Masters (Draw): Host: Akita, Akita Prefecture, Japan; Venue: CNA Arena Akita; Level: Super 100; Prize: $75,000; Format: 64MS/32WS/32MD/32WD/32XD	(South Korea) An Se-young	(Japan) Haruko Suzuki
12 August	Akita Masters (Draw): Host: Akita, Akita Prefecture, Japan; Venue: CNA Arena Akita; Level: Super 100; Prize: $75,000; Format: 64MS/32WS/32MD/32WD/32XD	Score: 21–10, 17–21, 21–14	
12 August	Akita Masters (Draw): Host: Akita, Akita Prefecture, Japan; Venue: CNA Arena Akita; Level: Super 100; Prize: $75,000; Format: 64MS/32WS/32MD/32WD/32XD	(China) Ou Xuanyi (China) Zhang Nan	(Japan) Akira Koga (Japan) Taichi Saito
12 August	Akita Masters (Draw): Host: Akita, Akita Prefecture, Japan; Venue: CNA Arena Akita; Level: Super 100; Prize: $75,000; Format: 64MS/32WS/32MD/32WD/32XD	Score: 21–14, 21–19	
12 August	Akita Masters (Draw): Host: Akita, Akita Prefecture, Japan; Venue: CNA Arena Akita; Level: Super 100; Prize: $75,000; Format: 64MS/32WS/32MD/32WD/32XD	(Japan) Ayako Sakuramoto (Japan) Yukiko Takahata	(Indonesia) Nita Violina Marwah (Indonesia) Putri Syaikah
12 August	Akita Masters (Draw): Host: Akita, Akita Prefecture, Japan; Venue: CNA Arena Akita; Level: Super 100; Prize: $75,000; Format: 64MS/32WS/32MD/32WD/32XD	Score: 21–17, 14–21, 21–15	
12 August	Akita Masters (Draw): Host: Akita, Akita Prefecture, Japan; Venue: CNA Arena Akita; Level: Super 100; Prize: $75,000; Format: 64MS/32WS/32MD/32WD/32XD	(South Korea) Ko Sung-hyun (South Korea) Eom Hye-won	(Japan) Kyohei Yamashita (Japan) Naru Shinoya
12 August	Akita Masters (Draw): Host: Akita, Akita Prefecture, Japan; Venue: CNA Arena Akita; Level: Super 100; Prize: $75,000; Format: 64MS/32WS/32MD/32WD/32XD	Score: 21–10, 21–17	
12 August	Bulgarian Open: Host: Sofia, Bulgaria; Venue: Badminton Hall Europe; Level: International Series; Prize: $10,000; Format: 32MS/32WS/32MD/32WD/32XD	(France) Toma Junior Popov	(New Zealand) Abhinav Manota
12 August	Bulgarian Open: Host: Sofia, Bulgaria; Venue: Badminton Hall Europe; Level: International Series; Prize: $10,000; Format: 32MS/32WS/32MD/32WD/32XD	Score: 21–15, 21–10	
12 August	Bulgarian Open: Host: Sofia, Bulgaria; Venue: Badminton Hall Europe; Level: International Series; Prize: $10,000; Format: 32MS/32WS/32MD/32WD/32XD	(Turkey) Neslihan Yiğit	(Bulgaria) Mariya Mitsova
12 August	Bulgarian Open: Host: Sofia, Bulgaria; Venue: Badminton Hall Europe; Level: International Series; Prize: $10,000; Format: 32MS/32WS/32MD/32WD/32XD	Score: 21–9, 21–14	
12 August	Bulgarian Open: Host: Sofia, Bulgaria; Venue: Badminton Hall Europe; Level: International Series; Prize: $10,000; Format: 32MS/32WS/32MD/32WD/32XD	(France) Eloi Adam (France) Julien Maio	(New Zealand) Oliver Leydon-Davis (New Zealand) Abhinav Manota
12 August	Bulgarian Open: Host: Sofia, Bulgaria; Venue: Badminton Hall Europe; Level: International Series; Prize: $10,000; Format: 32MS/32WS/32MD/32WD/32XD	Score: 10–21, 21–16, 21–12	
12 August	Bulgarian Open: Host: Sofia, Bulgaria; Venue: Badminton Hall Europe; Level: International Series; Prize: $10,000; Format: 32MS/32WS/32MD/32WD/32XD	(Turkey) Bengisu Erçetin (Turkey) Nazlıcan İnci	(Canada) Catherine Choi (Canada) Josephine Wu
12 August	Bulgarian Open: Host: Sofia, Bulgaria; Venue: Badminton Hall Europe; Level: International Series; Prize: $10,000; Format: 32MS/32WS/32MD/32WD/32XD	Score: 21–8, 21–8	
12 August	Bulgarian Open: Host: Sofia, Bulgaria; Venue: Badminton Hall Europe; Level: International Series; Prize: $10,000; Format: 32MS/32WS/32MD/32WD/32XD	(Canada) Joshua Hurlburt-Yu (Canada) Josephine Wu	(England) Matthew Clare (England) Lizzie Tolman
12 August	Bulgarian Open: Host: Sofia, Bulgaria; Venue: Badminton Hall Europe; Level: International Series; Prize: $10,000; Format: 32MS/32WS/32MD/32WD/32XD	Score: 21–16, 21–16	
12 August	Brazil Future Series: Host: Americana, São Paulo, Brazil; Venue: SESI Americana; Level: Future Series; Format: 32MS/32WS/16MD/8WD/16XD	(Brazil) Artur Silva Pomoceno	(Brazil) Donnians Oliveira
12 August	Brazil Future Series: Host: Americana, São Paulo, Brazil; Venue: SESI Americana; Level: Future Series; Format: 32MS/32WS/16MD/8WD/16XD	Score: 21–16, 21–23, 21–9	
12 August	Brazil Future Series: Host: Americana, São Paulo, Brazil; Venue: SESI Americana; Level: Future Series; Format: 32MS/32WS/16MD/8WD/16XD	(Brazil) Fabiana Silva	(Brazil) Jaqueline Lima
12 August	Brazil Future Series: Host: Americana, São Paulo, Brazil; Venue: SESI Americana; Level: Future Series; Format: 32MS/32WS/16MD/8WD/16XD	Score: 21–11, 19–21, 21–18	
12 August	Brazil Future Series: Host: Americana, São Paulo, Brazil; Venue: SESI Americana; Level: Future Series; Format: 32MS/32WS/16MD/8WD/16XD	(Brazil) Fabrício Farias (Brazil) Francielton Farias	(Argentina) Nicolás Oliva (Argentina) Santiago Otero
12 August	Brazil Future Series: Host: Americana, São Paulo, Brazil; Venue: SESI Americana; Level: Future Series; Format: 32MS/32WS/16MD/8WD/16XD	Score: 21–15, 21–15	
12 August	Brazil Future Series: Host: Americana, São Paulo, Brazil; Venue: SESI Americana; Level: Future Series; Format: 32MS/32WS/16MD/8WD/16XD	(Brazil) Jaqueline Lima (Brazil) Sâmia Lima	(Brazil) Mariana Pedrol Freitas (Brazil) Tamires Santos
12 August	Brazil Future Series: Host: Americana, São Paulo, Brazil; Venue: SESI Americana; Level: Future Series; Format: 32MS/32WS/16MD/8WD/16XD	Score: 21–15, 21–13	
12 August	Brazil Future Series: Host: Americana, São Paulo, Brazil; Venue: SESI Americana; Level: Future Series; Format: 32MS/32WS/16MD/8WD/16XD	(Brazil) Fabrício Farias (Brazil) Jaqueline Lima	(Brazil) Artur Silva Pomoceno (Brazil) Sâmia Lima
12 August	Brazil Future Series: Host: Americana, São Paulo, Brazil; Venue: SESI Americana; Level: Future Series; Format: 32MS/32WS/16MD/8WD/16XD	Score: 21–17, 21–16	
19 August	World Championships (Draw): Host: Basel, Switzerland; Venue: St. Jakobshalle; Level: World Championships; Prize: N/A; Format: 64MS/48WS/48MD/48WD/48XD	(Japan) Kento Momota	(Denmark) Anders Antonsen
19 August	World Championships (Draw): Host: Basel, Switzerland; Venue: St. Jakobshalle; Level: World Championships; Prize: N/A; Format: 64MS/48WS/48MD/48WD/48XD	Score: 21–9, 21–3	
19 August	World Championships (Draw): Host: Basel, Switzerland; Venue: St. Jakobshalle; Level: World Championships; Prize: N/A; Format: 64MS/48WS/48MD/48WD/48XD	(India) P. V. Sindhu	(Japan) Nozomi Okuhara
19 August	World Championships (Draw): Host: Basel, Switzerland; Venue: St. Jakobshalle; Level: World Championships; Prize: N/A; Format: 64MS/48WS/48MD/48WD/48XD	Score: 21–7, 21–7	
19 August	World Championships (Draw): Host: Basel, Switzerland; Venue: St. Jakobshalle; Level: World Championships; Prize: N/A; Format: 64MS/48WS/48MD/48WD/48XD	(Indonesia) Mohammad Ahsan (Indonesia) Hendra Setiawan	(Japan) Takuro Hoki (Japan) Yugo Kobayashi
19 August	World Championships (Draw): Host: Basel, Switzerland; Venue: St. Jakobshalle; Level: World Championships; Prize: N/A; Format: 64MS/48WS/48MD/48WD/48XD	Score: 25–23, 9–21, 21–15	
19 August	World Championships (Draw): Host: Basel, Switzerland; Venue: St. Jakobshalle; Level: World Championships; Prize: N/A; Format: 64MS/48WS/48MD/48WD/48XD	(Japan) Mayu Matsumoto (Japan) Wakana Nagahara	(Japan) Yuki Fukushima (Japan) Sayaka Hirota
19 August	World Championships (Draw): Host: Basel, Switzerland; Venue: St. Jakobshalle; Level: World Championships; Prize: N/A; Format: 64MS/48WS/48MD/48WD/48XD	Score: 21–11, 20–22, 23–21	
19 August	World Championships (Draw): Host: Basel, Switzerland; Venue: St. Jakobshalle; Level: World Championships; Prize: N/A; Format: 64MS/48WS/48MD/48WD/48XD	(China) Zheng Siwei (China) Huang Yaqiong	(Thailand) Dechapol Puavaranukroh (Thailand) Sapsiree Taerattanachai
19 August	World Championships (Draw): Host: Basel, Switzerland; Venue: St. Jakobshalle; Level: World Championships; Prize: N/A; Format: 64MS/48WS/48MD/48WD/48XD	Score: 21–8, 21–12	
19 August	Carebaco International: Host: Saint Michael, Barbados; Venue: Sir Garfield Sobers Gymnasium; Level: International Series; Prize: $10,000; Format: 32MS/32WS/16MD/8WD/32XD	(England) Sam Parsons	(United States) Timothy Lam
19 August	Carebaco International: Host: Saint Michael, Barbados; Venue: Sir Garfield Sobers Gymnasium; Level: International Series; Prize: $10,000; Format: 32MS/32WS/16MD/8WD/32XD	Score: 21–13, 21–11	
19 August	Carebaco International: Host: Saint Michael, Barbados; Venue: Sir Garfield Sobers Gymnasium; Level: International Series; Prize: $10,000; Format: 32MS/32WS/16MD/8WD/32XD	(Wales) Jordan Hart	(Finland) Airi Mikkela
19 August	Carebaco International: Host: Saint Michael, Barbados; Venue: Sir Garfield Sobers Gymnasium; Level: International Series; Prize: $10,000; Format: 32MS/32WS/16MD/8WD/32XD	Score: 21–15, 21–16	
19 August	Carebaco International: Host: Saint Michael, Barbados; Venue: Sir Garfield Sobers Gymnasium; Level: International Series; Prize: $10,000; Format: 32MS/32WS/16MD/8WD/32XD	(Jamaica) Gareth Henry (Jamaica) Samuel O'Brien Ricketts	(United States) Timothy Lam (Canada) Antonio Li
19 August	Carebaco International: Host: Saint Michael, Barbados; Venue: Sir Garfield Sobers Gymnasium; Level: International Series; Prize: $10,000; Format: 32MS/32WS/16MD/8WD/32XD	Score: 21–9, 21–16	
19 August	Carebaco International: Host: Saint Michael, Barbados; Venue: Sir Garfield Sobers Gymnasium; Level: International Series; Prize: $10,000; Format: 32MS/32WS/16MD/8WD/32XD	(Barbados) Monyata Riviera (Barbados) Tamisha Williams	(Czech Republic) Tereza Švábíková (Czech Republic) Katerina Tomalova
19 August	Carebaco International: Host: Saint Michael, Barbados; Venue: Sir Garfield Sobers Gymnasium; Level: International Series; Prize: $10,000; Format: 32MS/32WS/16MD/8WD/32XD	Score: Walkover	
19 August	Carebaco International: Host: Saint Michael, Barbados; Venue: Sir Garfield Sobers Gymnasium; Level: International Series; Prize: $10,000; Format: 32MS/32WS/16MD/8WD/32XD	(United States) Vinson Chiu (United States) Breanna Chi	(Brazil) Fabricio Farias (Brazil) Jaqueline Lima
19 August	Carebaco International: Host: Saint Michael, Barbados; Venue: Sir Garfield Sobers Gymnasium; Level: International Series; Prize: $10,000; Format: 32MS/32WS/16MD/8WD/32XD	Score: 21–16, 21–14	
19 August	African Games Mixed Team (Draw): Host: Casablanca, Morocco; Venue: Ain Chock Indoor Sports Center; Level: Continental Championships; Format: 13 teams	Nigeria	Algeria
19 August	African Games Mixed Team (Draw): Host: Casablanca, Morocco; Venue: Ain Chock Indoor Sports Center; Level: Continental Championships; Format: 13 teams	Enejoh Abah / Peace Orji; Anuoluwapo Juwon Opeyori; Dorcas Ajoke Adesokan; Enejoh Abah / Clement Krobakpo; Dorcas Ajoke Adesokan / Uchechukwu Deborah Ukeh	Koceila Mammeri / Linda Mazri; Youcef Sabri Medel; Halla Bouksani; Mohamed Abderrahime Belarbi / Koceila Mammeri; Linda Mazri / Malak Ouchefoune
19 August	African Games Mixed Team (Draw): Host: Casablanca, Morocco; Venue: Ain Chock Indoor Sports Center; Level: Continental Championships; Format: 13 teams	Score: 3–0	
26 August	Belarus International: Host: Minsk, Belarus; Venue: Falcon Club; Level: International Series; Prize: $10,000; Format: 32MS/32WS/32MD/16WD/32XD	(China) Lei Lanxi	(Estonia) Raul Must
26 August	Belarus International: Host: Minsk, Belarus; Venue: Falcon Club; Level: International Series; Prize: $10,000; Format: 32MS/32WS/32MD/16WD/32XD	Score: 21–10, 21–15	
26 August	Belarus International: Host: Minsk, Belarus; Venue: Falcon Club; Level: International Series; Prize: $10,000; Format: 32MS/32WS/32MD/16WD/32XD	(China) Wang Zhiyi	(China) Zhang Yiman
26 August	Belarus International: Host: Minsk, Belarus; Venue: Falcon Club; Level: International Series; Prize: $10,000; Format: 32MS/32WS/32MD/16WD/32XD	Score: 18–21, 21–9, 21–8	
26 August	Belarus International: Host: Minsk, Belarus; Venue: Falcon Club; Level: International Series; Prize: $10,000; Format: 32MS/32WS/32MD/16WD/32XD	(China) Ou Xuanyi (China) Zhang Nan	(England) Matthew Clare (England) Max Flynn
26 August	Belarus International: Host: Minsk, Belarus; Venue: Falcon Club; Level: International Series; Prize: $10,000; Format: 32MS/32WS/32MD/16WD/32XD	Score: 21–15, 21–15	
26 August	Belarus International: Host: Minsk, Belarus; Venue: Falcon Club; Level: International Series; Prize: $10,000; Format: 32MS/32WS/32MD/16WD/32XD	(China) Yu Xiaohan (China) Zhang Shuxian	(England) Jenny Moore (England) Victoria Williams
26 August	Belarus International: Host: Minsk, Belarus; Venue: Falcon Club; Level: International Series; Prize: $10,000; Format: 32MS/32WS/32MD/16WD/32XD	Score: 21–12, 21–15	
26 August	Belarus International: Host: Minsk, Belarus; Venue: Falcon Club; Level: International Series; Prize: $10,000; Format: 32MS/32WS/32MD/16WD/32XD	(China) Ren Xiangyu (China) Zhou Chaomin	(China) Guo Xinwa (China) Zhang Shuxian
26 August	Belarus International: Host: Minsk, Belarus; Venue: Falcon Club; Level: International Series; Prize: $10,000; Format: 32MS/32WS/32MD/16WD/32XD	Score: 22–20, 21–19	
26 August	African Games (Draw): Host: Casablanca, Morocco; Venue: Ain Chock Indoor Sports Center; Level: Continental Championships; Format: 64MS/64WS/32MD/32WD/64XD	(Nigeria) Anuoluwapo Juwon Opeyori	(Mauritius) Georges Paul
26 August	African Games (Draw): Host: Casablanca, Morocco; Venue: Ain Chock Indoor Sports Center; Level: Continental Championships; Format: 64MS/64WS/32MD/32WD/64XD	Score: 21–16, 21–17	
26 August	African Games (Draw): Host: Casablanca, Morocco; Venue: Ain Chock Indoor Sports Center; Level: Continental Championships; Format: 64MS/64WS/32MD/32WD/64XD	(South Africa) Johanita Scholtz	(Nigeria) Dorcas Ajoke Adesokan
26 August	African Games (Draw): Host: Casablanca, Morocco; Venue: Ain Chock Indoor Sports Center; Level: Continental Championships; Format: 64MS/64WS/32MD/32WD/64XD	Score: 21–19, 21–18	
26 August	African Games (Draw): Host: Casablanca, Morocco; Venue: Ain Chock Indoor Sports Center; Level: Continental Championships; Format: 64MS/64WS/32MD/32WD/64XD	(Mauritius) Aatish Lubah (Mauritius) Georges Paul	(Nigeria) Godwin Olofua (Nigeria) Anuoluwapo Juwon Opeyori
26 August	African Games (Draw): Host: Casablanca, Morocco; Venue: Ain Chock Indoor Sports Center; Level: Continental Championships; Format: 64MS/64WS/32MD/32WD/64XD	Score: 21–9, 21–18	
26 August	African Games (Draw): Host: Casablanca, Morocco; Venue: Ain Chock Indoor Sports Center; Level: Continental Championships; Format: 64MS/64WS/32MD/32WD/64XD	(Egypt) Doha Hany (Egypt) Hadia Hosny	(Nigeria) Dorcas Ajoke Adesokan (Nigeria) Uchechukwu Deborah Ukeh
26 August	African Games (Draw): Host: Casablanca, Morocco; Venue: Ain Chock Indoor Sports Center; Level: Continental Championships; Format: 64MS/64WS/32MD/32WD/64XD	Score: 21–9, 21–16	
26 August	African Games (Draw): Host: Casablanca, Morocco; Venue: Ain Chock Indoor Sports Center; Level: Continental Championships; Format: 64MS/64WS/32MD/32WD/64XD	(Algeria) Koceila Mammeri (Algeria) Linda Mazri	(Egypt) Adham Hatem Elgamal (Egypt) Doha Hany
26 August	African Games (Draw): Host: Casablanca, Morocco; Venue: Ain Chock Indoor Sports Center; Level: Continental Championships; Format: 64MS/64WS/32MD/32WD/64XD	Score: 21–19, 21–16	

=== September ===
Week commencing	Tournament	Champions	Runners-up
2 September	Chinese Taipei Open (Draw): Host: Taipei, Taiwan; Venue: Taipei Arena; Level: Super 300; Prize: $500,000; Format: 32MS/32WS/32MD/32WD/32XD	(Chinese Taipei) Chou Tien-chen	(South Korea) Heo Kwang-hee
2 September	Chinese Taipei Open (Draw): Host: Taipei, Taiwan; Venue: Taipei Arena; Level: Super 300; Prize: $500,000; Format: 32MS/32WS/32MD/32WD/32XD	Score: 21–12, 21–13	
2 September	Chinese Taipei Open (Draw): Host: Taipei, Taiwan; Venue: Taipei Arena; Level: Super 300; Prize: $500,000; Format: 32MS/32WS/32MD/32WD/32XD	(South Korea) Sung Ji-hyun	(Canada) Michelle Li
2 September	Chinese Taipei Open (Draw): Host: Taipei, Taiwan; Venue: Taipei Arena; Level: Super 300; Prize: $500,000; Format: 32MS/32WS/32MD/32WD/32XD	Score: 21–11, 21–9	
2 September	Chinese Taipei Open (Draw): Host: Taipei, Taiwan; Venue: Taipei Arena; Level: Super 300; Prize: $500,000; Format: 32MS/32WS/32MD/32WD/32XD	(Malaysia) Goh V Shem (Malaysia) Tan Wee Kiong	(South Korea) Choi Sol-gyu (South Korea) Seo Seung-jae
2 September	Chinese Taipei Open (Draw): Host: Taipei, Taiwan; Venue: Taipei Arena; Level: Super 300; Prize: $500,000; Format: 32MS/32WS/32MD/32WD/32XD	Score: 21–19, 15–21, 23–21	
2 September	Chinese Taipei Open (Draw): Host: Taipei, Taiwan; Venue: Taipei Arena; Level: Super 300; Prize: $500,000; Format: 32MS/32WS/32MD/32WD/32XD	(Thailand) Jongkolphan Kititharakul (Thailand) Rawinda Prajongjai	(South Korea) Kim So-yeong (South Korea) Kong Hee-yong
2 September	Chinese Taipei Open (Draw): Host: Taipei, Taiwan; Venue: Taipei Arena; Level: Super 300; Prize: $500,000; Format: 32MS/32WS/32MD/32WD/32XD	Score: 21–19, 18–21, 28–26	
2 September	Chinese Taipei Open (Draw): Host: Taipei, Taiwan; Venue: Taipei Arena; Level: Super 300; Prize: $500,000; Format: 32MS/32WS/32MD/32WD/32XD	(Hong Kong) Tang Chun Man (Hong Kong) Tse Ying Suet	(South Korea) Seo Seung-jae (South Korea) Chae Yoo-jung
2 September	Chinese Taipei Open (Draw): Host: Taipei, Taiwan; Venue: Taipei Arena; Level: Super 300; Prize: $500,000; Format: 32MS/32WS/32MD/32WD/32XD	Score: 21–18, 21–10	
2 September	Kharkiv International: Host: Kharkiv, Ukraine; Venue: Lokomotiv Sports Palace; Level: International Challenge; Prize: $25,000; Format: 32MS/32WS/32MD/32WD/32XD	(Netherlands) Mark Caljouw	(Azerbaijan) Ade Resky Dwicahyo
2 September	Kharkiv International: Host: Kharkiv, Ukraine; Venue: Lokomotiv Sports Palace; Level: International Challenge; Prize: $25,000; Format: 32MS/32WS/32MD/32WD/32XD	Score: 21–15, 21–10	
2 September	Kharkiv International: Host: Kharkiv, Ukraine; Venue: Lokomotiv Sports Palace; Level: International Challenge; Prize: $25,000; Format: 32MS/32WS/32MD/32WD/32XD	(France) Qi Xuefei	(Turkey) Neslihan Yiğit
2 September	Kharkiv International: Host: Kharkiv, Ukraine; Venue: Lokomotiv Sports Palace; Level: International Challenge; Prize: $25,000; Format: 32MS/32WS/32MD/32WD/32XD	Score: 21–18, 19–21, 21–16	
2 September	Kharkiv International: Host: Kharkiv, Ukraine; Venue: Lokomotiv Sports Palace; Level: International Challenge; Prize: $25,000; Format: 32MS/32WS/32MD/32WD/32XD	(England) Ben Lane (England) Sean Vendy	(England) Marcus Ellis (England) Chris Langridge
2 September	Kharkiv International: Host: Kharkiv, Ukraine; Venue: Lokomotiv Sports Palace; Level: International Challenge; Prize: $25,000; Format: 32MS/32WS/32MD/32WD/32XD	Score: 21–19, 21–18	
2 September	Kharkiv International: Host: Kharkiv, Ukraine; Venue: Lokomotiv Sports Palace; Level: International Challenge; Prize: $25,000; Format: 32MS/32WS/32MD/32WD/32XD	(England) Chloe Birch (England) Lauren Smith	(Canada) Rachel Honderich (Canada) Kristen Tsai
2 September	Kharkiv International: Host: Kharkiv, Ukraine; Venue: Lokomotiv Sports Palace; Level: International Challenge; Prize: $25,000; Format: 32MS/32WS/32MD/32WD/32XD	Score: 21–14, 21–18	
2 September	Kharkiv International: Host: Kharkiv, Ukraine; Venue: Lokomotiv Sports Palace; Level: International Challenge; Prize: $25,000; Format: 32MS/32WS/32MD/32WD/32XD	(Poland) Paweł Śmiłowski (Poland) Magdalena Świerczyńska	(France) Fabien Delrue (France) Vimala Hériau
2 September	Kharkiv International: Host: Kharkiv, Ukraine; Venue: Lokomotiv Sports Palace; Level: International Challenge; Prize: $25,000; Format: 32MS/32WS/32MD/32WD/32XD	Score: 22–20, 21–18	
2 September	Perth International: Host: Madeley, Perth, Australia; Venue: Kingsway Indoor Stadium; Level: Future Series; Format: 64MS/32WS/32MD/32WD/32XD	(Chinese Taipei) Chi Yu-jen	(Chinese Taipei) Liu Wei-chi
2 September	Perth International: Host: Madeley, Perth, Australia; Venue: Kingsway Indoor Stadium; Level: Future Series; Format: 64MS/32WS/32MD/32WD/32XD	Score: 21–16, 21–18	
2 September	Perth International: Host: Madeley, Perth, Australia; Venue: Kingsway Indoor Stadium; Level: Future Series; Format: 64MS/32WS/32MD/32WD/32XD	(Chinese Taipei) Liang Ting-yu	(Chinese Taipei) Lin Jhih-yun
2 September	Perth International: Host: Madeley, Perth, Australia; Venue: Kingsway Indoor Stadium; Level: Future Series; Format: 64MS/32WS/32MD/32WD/32XD	Score: 21–15, 17–21, 21–14	
2 September	Perth International: Host: Madeley, Perth, Australia; Venue: Kingsway Indoor Stadium; Level: Future Series; Format: 64MS/32WS/32MD/32WD/32XD	(Malaysia) Shia Chun Kang (Malaysia) Tan Boon Heong	(Chinese Taipei) Lee Chia-hao (Chinese Taipei) Liu Wei-chi
2 September	Perth International: Host: Madeley, Perth, Australia; Venue: Kingsway Indoor Stadium; Level: Future Series; Format: 64MS/32WS/32MD/32WD/32XD	Score: 21–17, 21–16	
2 September	Perth International: Host: Madeley, Perth, Australia; Venue: Kingsway Indoor Stadium; Level: Future Series; Format: 64MS/32WS/32MD/32WD/32XD	(Chinese Taipei) Cheng Yu-chieh (Chinese Taipei) Tseng Yu-chi	(Chinese Taipei) Chung Kan-yu (Chinese Taipei) Ye Jing-ya
2 September	Perth International: Host: Madeley, Perth, Australia; Venue: Kingsway Indoor Stadium; Level: Future Series; Format: 64MS/32WS/32MD/32WD/32XD	Score: 21–11, 16–21, 21–19	
2 September	Perth International: Host: Madeley, Perth, Australia; Venue: Kingsway Indoor Stadium; Level: Future Series; Format: 64MS/32WS/32MD/32WD/32XD	(Chinese Taipei) Chi Yu-jen (Chinese Taipei) Lin Xiao-min	(Malaysia) Tan Kok Xian (Malaysia) Wong Kha Yan
2 September	Perth International: Host: Madeley, Perth, Australia; Venue: Kingsway Indoor Stadium; Level: Future Series; Format: 64MS/32WS/32MD/32WD/32XD	Score: 21–16, 17–21, 21–17	
9 September	Vietnam Open (Draw): Host: Ho Chi Minh City, Vietnam; Venue: Nguyen Du Cultural Sports Club; Level: Super 100; Prize: $75,000; Format: 64MS/32WS/32MD/32WD/32XD	(India) Sourabh Verma	(China) Sun Feixiang
9 September	Vietnam Open (Draw): Host: Ho Chi Minh City, Vietnam; Venue: Nguyen Du Cultural Sports Club; Level: Super 100; Prize: $75,000; Format: 64MS/32WS/32MD/32WD/32XD	Score: 21–12, 17–21, 21–14	
9 September	Vietnam Open (Draw): Host: Ho Chi Minh City, Vietnam; Venue: Nguyen Du Cultural Sports Club; Level: Super 100; Prize: $75,000; Format: 64MS/32WS/32MD/32WD/32XD	(China) Zhang Yiman	(Japan) Asuka Takahashi
9 September	Vietnam Open (Draw): Host: Ho Chi Minh City, Vietnam; Venue: Nguyen Du Cultural Sports Club; Level: Super 100; Prize: $75,000; Format: 64MS/32WS/32MD/32WD/32XD	Score: 21–11, 21–18	
9 September	Vietnam Open (Draw): Host: Ho Chi Minh City, Vietnam; Venue: Nguyen Du Cultural Sports Club; Level: Super 100; Prize: $75,000; Format: 64MS/32WS/32MD/32WD/32XD	(South Korea) Choi Sol-gyu (South Korea) Seo Seung-jae	(South Korea) Na Sung-seung (South Korea) Wang Chan
9 September	Vietnam Open (Draw): Host: Ho Chi Minh City, Vietnam; Venue: Nguyen Du Cultural Sports Club; Level: Super 100; Prize: $75,000; Format: 64MS/32WS/32MD/32WD/32XD	Score: 18–21, 21–16, 21–14	
9 September	Vietnam Open (Draw): Host: Ho Chi Minh City, Vietnam; Venue: Nguyen Du Cultural Sports Club; Level: Super 100; Prize: $75,000; Format: 64MS/32WS/32MD/32WD/32XD	(Indonesia) Della Destiara Haris (Indonesia) Rizki Amelia Pradipta	(China) Huang Jia (China) Zhang Shuxian
9 September	Vietnam Open (Draw): Host: Ho Chi Minh City, Vietnam; Venue: Nguyen Du Cultural Sports Club; Level: Super 100; Prize: $75,000; Format: 64MS/32WS/32MD/32WD/32XD	Score: 21–18, 21–17	
9 September	Vietnam Open (Draw): Host: Ho Chi Minh City, Vietnam; Venue: Nguyen Du Cultural Sports Club; Level: Super 100; Prize: $75,000; Format: 64MS/32WS/32MD/32WD/32XD	(China) Guo Xinwa (China) Zhang Shuxian	(Chinese Taipei) Lee Jhe-huei (Chinese Taipei) Hsu Ya-ching
9 September	Vietnam Open (Draw): Host: Ho Chi Minh City, Vietnam; Venue: Nguyen Du Cultural Sports Club; Level: Super 100; Prize: $75,000; Format: 64MS/32WS/32MD/32WD/32XD	Score: 18–21, 22–20, 21–8	
9 September	South Australia International: Host: Adelaide, Australia; Venue: Titanium Arena; Level: International Challenge; Prize: $25,000; Format: 64MS/32WS/32MD/32WD/32XD	(Malaysia) Ng Tze Yong	(South Korea) Lee Hyun-il
9 September	South Australia International: Host: Adelaide, Australia; Venue: Titanium Arena; Level: International Challenge; Prize: $25,000; Format: 64MS/32WS/32MD/32WD/32XD	Score: 23–21, 5–1 Retired	
9 September	South Australia International: Host: Adelaide, Australia; Venue: Titanium Arena; Level: International Challenge; Prize: $25,000; Format: 64MS/32WS/32MD/32WD/32XD	(Japan) Natsuki Nidaira	(Japan) Yukino Nakai
9 September	South Australia International: Host: Adelaide, Australia; Venue: Titanium Arena; Level: International Challenge; Prize: $25,000; Format: 64MS/32WS/32MD/32WD/32XD	Score: 20–22, 21–12, 21–10	
9 September	South Australia International: Host: Adelaide, Australia; Venue: Titanium Arena; Level: International Challenge; Prize: $25,000; Format: 64MS/32WS/32MD/32WD/32XD	(South Korea) Kim Duk-young (South Korea) Kim Sa-rang	(Malaysia) Shia Chun Kang (Malaysia) Tan Boon Heong
9 September	South Australia International: Host: Adelaide, Australia; Venue: Titanium Arena; Level: International Challenge; Prize: $25,000; Format: 64MS/32WS/32MD/32WD/32XD	Score: 21–14, 17–21, 21–16	
9 September	South Australia International: Host: Adelaide, Australia; Venue: Titanium Arena; Level: International Challenge; Prize: $25,000; Format: 64MS/32WS/32MD/32WD/32XD	(Japan) Rin Iwanaga (Japan) Kie Nakanishi	(Australia) Setyana Mapasa (Australia) Gronya Somerville
9 September	South Australia International: Host: Adelaide, Australia; Venue: Titanium Arena; Level: International Challenge; Prize: $25,000; Format: 64MS/32WS/32MD/32WD/32XD	Score: 21–15, 19–21, 21–9	
9 September	South Australia International: Host: Adelaide, Australia; Venue: Titanium Arena; Level: International Challenge; Prize: $25,000; Format: 64MS/32WS/32MD/32WD/32XD	(Canada) Joshua Hurlburt-Yu (Canada) Josephine Wu	(Indonesia) Dejan Ferdinansyah (Indonesia) Serena Kani
9 September	South Australia International: Host: Adelaide, Australia; Venue: Titanium Arena; Level: International Challenge; Prize: $25,000; Format: 64MS/32WS/32MD/32WD/32XD	Score: 21–19, 25–27, 21–16	
9 September	Belgian International: Host: Leuven, Belgium; Venue: Sportoase; Level: International Challenge; Prize: $25,000; Format: 32MS/32WS/32MD/32WD/32XD	(India) Lakshya Sen	(Denmark) Victor Svendsen
9 September	Belgian International: Host: Leuven, Belgium; Venue: Sportoase; Level: International Challenge; Prize: $25,000; Format: 32MS/32WS/32MD/32WD/32XD	Score: 21–14, 21–15	
9 September	Belgian International: Host: Leuven, Belgium; Venue: Sportoase; Level: International Challenge; Prize: $25,000; Format: 32MS/32WS/32MD/32WD/32XD	(Denmark) Line Christophersen	(Turkey) Neslihan Yiğit
9 September	Belgian International: Host: Leuven, Belgium; Venue: Sportoase; Level: International Challenge; Prize: $25,000; Format: 32MS/32WS/32MD/32WD/32XD	Score: 23–21, 12–21, 21–11	
9 September	Belgian International: Host: Leuven, Belgium; Venue: Sportoase; Level: International Challenge; Prize: $25,000; Format: 32MS/32WS/32MD/32WD/32XD	(England) Ben Lane (England) Sean Vendy	(Germany) Bjarne Geiss (Germany) Jan Colin Völker
9 September	Belgian International: Host: Leuven, Belgium; Venue: Sportoase; Level: International Challenge; Prize: $25,000; Format: 32MS/32WS/32MD/32WD/32XD	Score: 21–11, 21–14	
9 September	Belgian International: Host: Leuven, Belgium; Venue: Sportoase; Level: International Challenge; Prize: $25,000; Format: 32MS/32WS/32MD/32WD/32XD	(Bulgaria) Gabriela Stoeva (Bulgaria) Stefani Stoeva	(Canada) Rachel Honderich (Canada) Kristen Tsai
9 September	Belgian International: Host: Leuven, Belgium; Venue: Sportoase; Level: International Challenge; Prize: $25,000; Format: 32MS/32WS/32MD/32WD/32XD	Score: 21–16, 21–15	
9 September	Belgian International: Host: Leuven, Belgium; Venue: Sportoase; Level: International Challenge; Prize: $25,000; Format: 32MS/32WS/32MD/32WD/32XD	(England) Ben Lane (England) Jessica Pugh	(Denmark) Mikkel Mikkelsen (Denmark) Amalie Magelund
9 September	Belgian International: Host: Leuven, Belgium; Venue: Sportoase; Level: International Challenge; Prize: $25,000; Format: 32MS/32WS/32MD/32WD/32XD	Score: 21–12, 21–15	
9 September	Myanmar International: Host: Yangon, Myanmar; Venue: National Badminton Stadium; Level: International Series; Prize: $10,000; Format: 64MS/32WS/32MD/8WD/16XD	(India) Kaushal Dharmamer	(Indonesia) Karono
9 September	Myanmar International: Host: Yangon, Myanmar; Venue: National Badminton Stadium; Level: International Series; Prize: $10,000; Format: 64MS/32WS/32MD/8WD/16XD	Score: 18–21, 21–14, 21–11	
9 September	Myanmar International: Host: Yangon, Myanmar; Venue: National Badminton Stadium; Level: International Series; Prize: $10,000; Format: 64MS/32WS/32MD/8WD/16XD	(Indonesia) Sri Fatmawati	(Indonesia) Maharani Sekar Batari
9 September	Myanmar International: Host: Yangon, Myanmar; Venue: National Badminton Stadium; Level: International Series; Prize: $10,000; Format: 64MS/32WS/32MD/8WD/16XD	Score: 21–16, 21–13	
9 September	Myanmar International: Host: Yangon, Myanmar; Venue: National Badminton Stadium; Level: International Series; Prize: $10,000; Format: 64MS/32WS/32MD/8WD/16XD	(Indonesia) Emanuel Randhy Febryto (Indonesia) Ferdian Mahardika Ranialdy	(Thailand) Ruttanapak Oupthong (Thailand) Nanthakarn Yordphaisong
9 September	Myanmar International: Host: Yangon, Myanmar; Venue: National Badminton Stadium; Level: International Series; Prize: $10,000; Format: 64MS/32WS/32MD/8WD/16XD	Score: 21–16, 21–15	
9 September	Myanmar International: Host: Yangon, Myanmar; Venue: National Badminton Stadium; Level: International Series; Prize: $10,000; Format: 64MS/32WS/32MD/8WD/16XD	(Chinese Taipei) Liu Chiao-yun (Chinese Taipei) Wang Yu-qiao	(Thailand) Pattaranan Chamnaktan (Thailand) Thanyasuda Wongya
9 September	Myanmar International: Host: Yangon, Myanmar; Venue: National Badminton Stadium; Level: International Series; Prize: $10,000; Format: 64MS/32WS/32MD/8WD/16XD	Score: 21–18, 21–17	
9 September	Myanmar International: Host: Yangon, Myanmar; Venue: National Badminton Stadium; Level: International Series; Prize: $10,000; Format: 64MS/32WS/32MD/8WD/16XD	(Chinese Taipei) Lin Yong-sheng (Chinese Taipei) Liu Chiao-yun	(Thailand) Krit Tantianankul (Thailand) Thanyasuda Wongya
9 September	Myanmar International: Host: Yangon, Myanmar; Venue: National Badminton Stadium; Level: International Series; Prize: $10,000; Format: 64MS/32WS/32MD/8WD/16XD	Score: 21–13, 21–14	
16 September	China Open (Draw): Host: Changzhou, China; Venue: Olympic Sports Center Xincheng Gymnasium; Level: Super 1000; Prize: $1,000,000; Format: 32MS/32WS/32MD/32WD/32XD	(Japan) Kento Momota	(Indonesia) Anthony Sinisuka Ginting
16 September	China Open (Draw): Host: Changzhou, China; Venue: Olympic Sports Center Xincheng Gymnasium; Level: Super 1000; Prize: $1,000,000; Format: 32MS/32WS/32MD/32WD/32XD	Score: 19–21, 21–17, 21–19	
16 September	China Open (Draw): Host: Changzhou, China; Venue: Olympic Sports Center Xincheng Gymnasium; Level: Super 1000; Prize: $1,000,000; Format: 32MS/32WS/32MD/32WD/32XD	(Spain) Carolina Marín	(Chinese Taipei) Tai Tzu-ying
16 September	China Open (Draw): Host: Changzhou, China; Venue: Olympic Sports Center Xincheng Gymnasium; Level: Super 1000; Prize: $1,000,000; Format: 32MS/32WS/32MD/32WD/32XD	Score: 14–21, 21–17, 21–18	
16 September	China Open (Draw): Host: Changzhou, China; Venue: Olympic Sports Center Xincheng Gymnasium; Level: Super 1000; Prize: $1,000,000; Format: 32MS/32WS/32MD/32WD/32XD	(Indonesia) Marcus Fernaldi Gideon (Indonesia) Kevin Sanjaya Sukamuljo	(Indonesia) Mohammad Ahsan (Indonesia) Hendra Setiawan
16 September	China Open (Draw): Host: Changzhou, China; Venue: Olympic Sports Center Xincheng Gymnasium; Level: Super 1000; Prize: $1,000,000; Format: 32MS/32WS/32MD/32WD/32XD	Score: 21–18, 17–21, 21–15	
16 September	China Open (Draw): Host: Changzhou, China; Venue: Olympic Sports Center Xincheng Gymnasium; Level: Super 1000; Prize: $1,000,000; Format: 32MS/32WS/32MD/32WD/32XD	(China) Chen Qingchen (China) Jia Yifan	(Japan) Misaki Matsutomo (Japan) Ayaka Takahashi
16 September	China Open (Draw): Host: Changzhou, China; Venue: Olympic Sports Center Xincheng Gymnasium; Level: Super 1000; Prize: $1,000,000; Format: 32MS/32WS/32MD/32WD/32XD	Score: 21–14, 21–18	
16 September	China Open (Draw): Host: Changzhou, China; Venue: Olympic Sports Center Xincheng Gymnasium; Level: Super 1000; Prize: $1,000,000; Format: 32MS/32WS/32MD/32WD/32XD	(China) Zheng Siwei (China) Huang Yaqiong	(China) Wang Yilyu (China) Huang Dongping
16 September	China Open (Draw): Host: Changzhou, China; Venue: Olympic Sports Center Xincheng Gymnasium; Level: Super 1000; Prize: $1,000,000; Format: 32MS/32WS/32MD/32WD/32XD	Score: 21–17, 13–21, 21–16	
16 September	Sydney International: Host: Sydney, Australia; Venue: Sydney Olympic Park Sports Halls; Level: International Series; Prize: $10,000; Format: 64MS/32WS/32MD/32WD/32XD	(Japan) Yusuke Onodera	(Malaysia) Lim Chong King
16 September	Sydney International: Host: Sydney, Australia; Venue: Sydney Olympic Park Sports Halls; Level: International Series; Prize: $10,000; Format: 64MS/32WS/32MD/32WD/32XD	Score: 21–8, 21–15	
16 September	Sydney International: Host: Sydney, Australia; Venue: Sydney Olympic Park Sports Halls; Level: International Series; Prize: $10,000; Format: 64MS/32WS/32MD/32WD/32XD	(Malaysia) Kisona Selvaduray	(Japan) Shiori Ebihara
16 September	Sydney International: Host: Sydney, Australia; Venue: Sydney Olympic Park Sports Halls; Level: International Series; Prize: $10,000; Format: 64MS/32WS/32MD/32WD/32XD	Score: 21–18, 21–13	
16 September	Sydney International: Host: Sydney, Australia; Venue: Sydney Olympic Park Sports Halls; Level: International Series; Prize: $10,000; Format: 64MS/32WS/32MD/32WD/32XD	(Chinese Taipei) Chen Xin-yuan (Chinese Taipei) Lin Yu-chieh	(Philippines) Peter Gabriel Magnaye (Philippines) Alvin Morada
16 September	Sydney International: Host: Sydney, Australia; Venue: Sydney Olympic Park Sports Halls; Level: International Series; Prize: $10,000; Format: 64MS/32WS/32MD/32WD/32XD	Score: 9–21, 21–11, 21–15	
16 September	Sydney International: Host: Sydney, Australia; Venue: Sydney Olympic Park Sports Halls; Level: International Series; Prize: $10,000; Format: 64MS/32WS/32MD/32WD/32XD	(Chinese Taipei) Cheng Yu-chieh (Chinese Taipei) Tseng Yu-chi	(Malaysia) Pearly Tan (Malaysia) Muralitharan Thinaah
16 September	Sydney International: Host: Sydney, Australia; Venue: Sydney Olympic Park Sports Halls; Level: International Series; Prize: $10,000; Format: 64MS/32WS/32MD/32WD/32XD	Score: 21–17, 17–21, 21–13	
16 September	Sydney International: Host: Sydney, Australia; Venue: Sydney Olympic Park Sports Halls; Level: International Series; Prize: $10,000; Format: 64MS/32WS/32MD/32WD/32XD	(Philippines) Peter Gabriel Magnaye (Philippines) Thea Pomar	(New Zealand) Oliver Leydon-Davis (New Zealand) Anona Pak
16 September	Sydney International: Host: Sydney, Australia; Venue: Sydney Olympic Park Sports Halls; Level: International Series; Prize: $10,000; Format: 64MS/32WS/32MD/32WD/32XD	Score: 21–9, 21–19	
16 September	Polish International: Host: Bieruń, Poland; Venue: Sport Hall; Level: International Series; Prize: $10,000; Format: 32MS/32WS/32MD/32WD/32XD	(Denmark) Mads Christophersen	(Bulgaria) Ivan Rusev
16 September	Polish International: Host: Bieruń, Poland; Venue: Sport Hall; Level: International Series; Prize: $10,000; Format: 32MS/32WS/32MD/32WD/32XD	Score: 21–6, 21–14	
16 September	Polish International: Host: Bieruń, Poland; Venue: Sport Hall; Level: International Series; Prize: $10,000; Format: 32MS/32WS/32MD/32WD/32XD	(Wales) Jordan Hart	(Denmark) Irina Amalie Andersen
16 September	Polish International: Host: Bieruń, Poland; Venue: Sport Hall; Level: International Series; Prize: $10,000; Format: 32MS/32WS/32MD/32WD/32XD	Score: 18–21, 21–13, 21–13	
16 September	Polish International: Host: Bieruń, Poland; Venue: Sport Hall; Level: International Series; Prize: $10,000; Format: 32MS/32WS/32MD/32WD/32XD	(England) Zach Russ (England) Steven Stallwood	(Denmark) Jeppe Bay (Denmark) Mikkel Mikkelsen
16 September	Polish International: Host: Bieruń, Poland; Venue: Sport Hall; Level: International Series; Prize: $10,000; Format: 32MS/32WS/32MD/32WD/32XD	Score: 22–20, 21–19	
16 September	Polish International: Host: Bieruń, Poland; Venue: Sport Hall; Level: International Series; Prize: $10,000; Format: 32MS/32WS/32MD/32WD/32XD	(Denmark) Amalie Magelund (Denmark) Freja Ravn	(Sweden) Emma Karlsson (Sweden) Johanna Magnusson
16 September	Polish International: Host: Bieruń, Poland; Venue: Sport Hall; Level: International Series; Prize: $10,000; Format: 32MS/32WS/32MD/32WD/32XD	Score: 15–21, 21–15, 21–15	
16 September	Polish International: Host: Bieruń, Poland; Venue: Sport Hall; Level: International Series; Prize: $10,000; Format: 32MS/32WS/32MD/32WD/32XD	(Denmark) Mikkel Mikkelsen (Denmark) Amalie Magelund	(Netherlands) Ruben Jille (Netherlands) Alyssa Tirtosentono
16 September	Polish International: Host: Bieruń, Poland; Venue: Sport Hall; Level: International Series; Prize: $10,000; Format: 32MS/32WS/32MD/32WD/32XD	Score: 21–19, 21–17	
16 September	Internacional Mexicano: Host: Aguascalientes City, Mexico; Venue: Gimnasio De Ciudad Deportiva; Level: International Series; Prize: $10,000; Format: 32MS/32WS/32MD/16WD/32XD	(Guatemala) Kevin Cordón	(Mexico) Lino Muñoz
16 September	Internacional Mexicano: Host: Aguascalientes City, Mexico; Venue: Gimnasio De Ciudad Deportiva; Level: International Series; Prize: $10,000; Format: 32MS/32WS/32MD/16WD/32XD	Score: 21–16, 21–13	
16 September	Internacional Mexicano: Host: Aguascalientes City, Mexico; Venue: Gimnasio De Ciudad Deportiva; Level: International Series; Prize: $10,000; Format: 32MS/32WS/32MD/16WD/32XD	(Indonesia) Ghaida Nurul Ghaniyu	(Brazil) Fabiana Silva
16 September	Internacional Mexicano: Host: Aguascalientes City, Mexico; Venue: Gimnasio De Ciudad Deportiva; Level: International Series; Prize: $10,000; Format: 32MS/32WS/32MD/16WD/32XD	Score: 21–19, 21–17	
16 September	Internacional Mexicano: Host: Aguascalientes City, Mexico; Venue: Gimnasio De Ciudad Deportiva; Level: International Series; Prize: $10,000; Format: 32MS/32WS/32MD/16WD/32XD	(Guatemala) Aníbal Marroquín (Guatemala) Jonathan Solís	(Mexico) Andrés López (Mexico) Lino Muñoz
16 September	Internacional Mexicano: Host: Aguascalientes City, Mexico; Venue: Gimnasio De Ciudad Deportiva; Level: International Series; Prize: $10,000; Format: 32MS/32WS/32MD/16WD/32XD	Score: 21–16, 21–13	
16 September	Internacional Mexicano: Host: Aguascalientes City, Mexico; Venue: Gimnasio De Ciudad Deportiva; Level: International Series; Prize: $10,000; Format: 32MS/32WS/32MD/16WD/32XD	(United States) Breanna Chi (United States) Jennie Gai	(Mexico) Jessica Bautista (Mexico) Vanessa Villalobos
16 September	Internacional Mexicano: Host: Aguascalientes City, Mexico; Venue: Gimnasio De Ciudad Deportiva; Level: International Series; Prize: $10,000; Format: 32MS/32WS/32MD/16WD/32XD	Score: 21–10, 21–10	
16 September	Internacional Mexicano: Host: Aguascalientes City, Mexico; Venue: Gimnasio De Ciudad Deportiva; Level: International Series; Prize: $10,000; Format: 32MS/32WS/32MD/16WD/32XD	(Mexico) Luis Montoya (Mexico) Vanessa Villalobos	(Brazil) Fabrício Farias (Brazil) Jaqueline Lima
16 September	Internacional Mexicano: Host: Aguascalientes City, Mexico; Venue: Gimnasio De Ciudad Deportiva; Level: International Series; Prize: $10,000; Format: 32MS/32WS/32MD/16WD/32XD	Score: 21–19, 21–19	
16 September	Maldives Future Series: Host: Malé, Maldives; Venue: Malé Sports Complex; Level: Future Series; Format: 64MS/32WS/16MD/8WD/8XD	(Thailand) Kantawat Leelavechabutr	(India) Kevin Arokia Walter
16 September	Maldives Future Series: Host: Malé, Maldives; Venue: Malé Sports Complex; Level: Future Series; Format: 64MS/32WS/16MD/8WD/8XD	Score: 21–13, 21–14	
16 September	Maldives Future Series: Host: Malé, Maldives; Venue: Malé Sports Complex; Level: Future Series; Format: 64MS/32WS/16MD/8WD/8XD	(India) Malvika Bansod	(Myanmar) Thet Htar Thuzar
16 September	Maldives Future Series: Host: Malé, Maldives; Venue: Malé Sports Complex; Level: Future Series; Format: 64MS/32WS/16MD/8WD/8XD	Score: 21–13, 21–11	
16 September	Maldives Future Series: Host: Malé, Maldives; Venue: Malé Sports Complex; Level: Future Series; Format: 64MS/32WS/16MD/8WD/8XD	(India) Vaibhaav (India) Prakash Raj	(Thailand) Pakkapon Teeraratsakul (Thailand) Panitchaphon Teeraratsakul
16 September	Maldives Future Series: Host: Malé, Maldives; Venue: Malé Sports Complex; Level: Future Series; Format: 64MS/32WS/16MD/8WD/8XD	Score: 21–16, 21–15	
16 September	Maldives Future Series: Host: Malé, Maldives; Venue: Malé Sports Complex; Level: Future Series; Format: 64MS/32WS/16MD/8WD/8XD	(Chinese Taipei) Kuo Yu-wen (Chinese Taipei) Lin Wan-ching	(Sri Lanka) Thilini Hendahewa (Sri Lanka) Kavidi Sirimannage
16 September	Maldives Future Series: Host: Malé, Maldives; Venue: Malé Sports Complex; Level: Future Series; Format: 64MS/32WS/16MD/8WD/8XD	Score: 21–19, 21–18	
16 September	Maldives Future Series: Host: Malé, Maldives; Venue: Malé Sports Complex; Level: Future Series; Format: 64MS/32WS/16MD/8WD/8XD	(Chinese Taipei) Lu Chia-pin (Chinese Taipei) Lin Wan-ching	(Malaysia) Velayutham Roobenraj (Malaysia) Venosha Radhakrishnan
16 September	Maldives Future Series: Host: Malé, Maldives; Venue: Malé Sports Complex; Level: Future Series; Format: 64MS/32WS/16MD/8WD/8XD	Score: 21–10, 21–18	
23 September	Korea Open (Draw): Host: Incheon, South Korea; Venue: Incheon Airport Skydome; Level: Super 500; Prize: $400,000; Format: 32MS/32WS/32MD/32WD/32XD	(Japan) Kento Momota	(Chinese Taipei) Chou Tien-chen
23 September	Korea Open (Draw): Host: Incheon, South Korea; Venue: Incheon Airport Skydome; Level: Super 500; Prize: $400,000; Format: 32MS/32WS/32MD/32WD/32XD	Score: 21–19, 21–17	
23 September	Korea Open (Draw): Host: Incheon, South Korea; Venue: Incheon Airport Skydome; Level: Super 500; Prize: $400,000; Format: 32MS/32WS/32MD/32WD/32XD	(China) He Bingjiao	(Thailand) Ratchanok Intanon
23 September	Korea Open (Draw): Host: Incheon, South Korea; Venue: Incheon Airport Skydome; Level: Super 500; Prize: $400,000; Format: 32MS/32WS/32MD/32WD/32XD	Score: 18–21, 24–22, 21–17	
23 September	Korea Open (Draw): Host: Incheon, South Korea; Venue: Incheon Airport Skydome; Level: Super 500; Prize: $400,000; Format: 32MS/32WS/32MD/32WD/32XD	(Indonesia) Fajar Alfian (Indonesia) Muhammad Rian Ardianto	(Japan) Takeshi Kamura (Japan) Keigo Sonoda
23 September	Korea Open (Draw): Host: Incheon, South Korea; Venue: Incheon Airport Skydome; Level: Super 500; Prize: $400,000; Format: 32MS/32WS/32MD/32WD/32XD	Score: 21–16, 21–17	
23 September	Korea Open (Draw): Host: Incheon, South Korea; Venue: Incheon Airport Skydome; Level: Super 500; Prize: $400,000; Format: 32MS/32WS/32MD/32WD/32XD	(South Korea) Kim So-yeong (South Korea) Kong Hee-yong	(South Korea) Lee So-hee (South Korea) Shin Seung-chan
23 September	Korea Open (Draw): Host: Incheon, South Korea; Venue: Incheon Airport Skydome; Level: Super 500; Prize: $400,000; Format: 32MS/32WS/32MD/32WD/32XD	Score: 13–21, 21–19, 21–17	
23 September	Korea Open (Draw): Host: Incheon, South Korea; Venue: Incheon Airport Skydome; Level: Super 500; Prize: $400,000; Format: 32MS/32WS/32MD/32WD/32XD	(Thailand) Dechapol Puavaranukroh (Thailand) Sapsiree Taerattanachai	(China) Zheng Siwei (China) Huang Yaqiong
23 September	Korea Open (Draw): Host: Incheon, South Korea; Venue: Incheon Airport Skydome; Level: Super 500; Prize: $400,000; Format: 32MS/32WS/32MD/32WD/32XD	Score: 21–14, 21–13	
23 September	Maldives International: Host: Malé, Maldives; Venue: Malé Sports Complex; Level: International Challenge; Prize: $25,000; Format: 64MS/64WS/32MD/16WD/32XD	(India) Kaushal Dharmamer	(India) Siril Verma
23 September	Maldives International: Host: Malé, Maldives; Venue: Malé Sports Complex; Level: International Challenge; Prize: $25,000; Format: 64MS/64WS/32MD/16WD/32XD	Score: 21–13, 21–18	
23 September	Maldives International: Host: Malé, Maldives; Venue: Malé Sports Complex; Level: International Challenge; Prize: $25,000; Format: 64MS/64WS/32MD/16WD/32XD	(United States) Iris Wang	(Vietnam) Vũ Thị Trang
23 September	Maldives International: Host: Malé, Maldives; Venue: Malé Sports Complex; Level: International Challenge; Prize: $25,000; Format: 64MS/64WS/32MD/16WD/32XD	Score: 21–15, 21–14	
23 September	Maldives International: Host: Malé, Maldives; Venue: Malé Sports Complex; Level: International Challenge; Prize: $25,000; Format: 64MS/64WS/32MD/16WD/32XD	(Japan) Keiichiro Matsui (Japan) Yoshinori Takeuchi	(India) Arun George (India) Sanyam Shukla
23 September	Maldives International: Host: Malé, Maldives; Venue: Malé Sports Complex; Level: International Challenge; Prize: $25,000; Format: 64MS/64WS/32MD/16WD/32XD	Score: 21–9, 22–20	
23 September	Maldives International: Host: Malé, Maldives; Venue: Malé Sports Complex; Level: International Challenge; Prize: $25,000; Format: 64MS/64WS/32MD/16WD/32XD	(Japan) Sayaka Hobara (Japan) Natsuki Sone	(India) Ashwini Ponnappa (India) N. Sikki Reddy
23 September	Maldives International: Host: Malé, Maldives; Venue: Malé Sports Complex; Level: International Challenge; Prize: $25,000; Format: 64MS/64WS/32MD/16WD/32XD	Score: 21–10, 17–21, 21–12	
23 September	Maldives International: Host: Malé, Maldives; Venue: Malé Sports Complex; Level: International Challenge; Prize: $25,000; Format: 64MS/64WS/32MD/16WD/32XD	(Thailand) Chaloempon Charoenkitamorn (Thailand) Chasinee Korepap	(India) Saipratheek K. Krishnaprasad (India) K. Ashwini Bhat
23 September	Maldives International: Host: Malé, Maldives; Venue: Malé Sports Complex; Level: International Challenge; Prize: $25,000; Format: 64MS/64WS/32MD/16WD/32XD	Score: 21–11, 21–15	
23 September	Nepal International: Host: Tripureshwor, Nepal; Venue: National Sports Council; Level: International Series; Prize: $10,000; Format: 64MS/32WS/32MD/8WD/16XD	(Malaysia) Yeoh Seng Zoe	(India) Swarnaraj Bora
23 September	Nepal International: Host: Tripureshwor, Nepal; Venue: National Sports Council; Level: International Series; Prize: $10,000; Format: 64MS/32WS/32MD/8WD/16XD	Score: 21–19, 21–8	
23 September	Nepal International: Host: Tripureshwor, Nepal; Venue: National Sports Council; Level: International Series; Prize: $10,000; Format: 64MS/32WS/32MD/8WD/16XD	(India) Malvika Bansod	(India) Gayathri Gopichand
23 September	Nepal International: Host: Tripureshwor, Nepal; Venue: National Sports Council; Level: International Series; Prize: $10,000; Format: 64MS/32WS/32MD/8WD/16XD	Score: 21–14, 21–18	
23 September	Nepal International: Host: Tripureshwor, Nepal; Venue: National Sports Council; Level: International Series; Prize: $10,000; Format: 64MS/32WS/32MD/8WD/16XD	(India) Rohan Kapoor (India) Saurabh Sharma	(Malaysia) Izzat Farhan Azhar (Malaysia) Zachary Chiong Shen Sia
23 September	Nepal International: Host: Tripureshwor, Nepal; Venue: National Sports Council; Level: International Series; Prize: $10,000; Format: 64MS/32WS/32MD/8WD/16XD	Score: 21–10, 21–12	
23 September	Nepal International: Host: Tripureshwor, Nepal; Venue: National Sports Council; Level: International Series; Prize: $10,000; Format: 64MS/32WS/32MD/8WD/16XD	(Nepal) Pooja Shrestha (Nepal) Nangsal Tamang	(Nepal) Jessica Gurung (Nepal) Anu Maya Rai
23 September	Nepal International: Host: Tripureshwor, Nepal; Venue: National Sports Council; Level: International Series; Prize: $10,000; Format: 64MS/32WS/32MD/8WD/16XD	Score: 21–15, 21–16	
23 September	Nepal International: Host: Tripureshwor, Nepal; Venue: National Sports Council; Level: International Series; Prize: $10,000; Format: 64MS/32WS/32MD/8WD/16XD	(India) Venkat Gaurav Prasad (India) Juhi Dewangan	(Thailand) Phutthaporn Bowornwatanuwong (Indonesia) Ririn Amelia
23 September	Nepal International: Host: Tripureshwor, Nepal; Venue: National Sports Council; Level: International Series; Prize: $10,000; Format: 64MS/32WS/32MD/8WD/16XD	Score: 21–19, 17–10 Retired	
23 September	Guatemala International: Host: Guatemala City, Guatemala; Venue: Gimnasio Teodoro Palacios Flores; Level: International Series; Prize: $10,000; Format: 32MS/32WS/16MD/8WD/16XD	(Guatemala) Kevin Cordón	(Mexico) Lino Muñoz
23 September	Guatemala International: Host: Guatemala City, Guatemala; Venue: Gimnasio Teodoro Palacios Flores; Level: International Series; Prize: $10,000; Format: 32MS/32WS/16MD/8WD/16XD	Score: 21–6, 11–3 Retired	
23 September	Guatemala International: Host: Guatemala City, Guatemala; Venue: Gimnasio Teodoro Palacios Flores; Level: International Series; Prize: $10,000; Format: 32MS/32WS/16MD/8WD/16XD	(Indonesia) Ghaida Nurul Ghaniyu	(Brazil) Fabiana Silva
23 September	Guatemala International: Host: Guatemala City, Guatemala; Venue: Gimnasio Teodoro Palacios Flores; Level: International Series; Prize: $10,000; Format: 32MS/32WS/16MD/8WD/16XD	Score: 21–19 21–13	
23 September	Guatemala International: Host: Guatemala City, Guatemala; Venue: Gimnasio Teodoro Palacios Flores; Level: International Series; Prize: $10,000; Format: 32MS/32WS/16MD/8WD/16XD	(Brazil) Fabricio Farias (Brazil) Francielton Farias	(Mexico) Job Castillo (Mexico) Luis Montoya
23 September	Guatemala International: Host: Guatemala City, Guatemala; Venue: Gimnasio Teodoro Palacios Flores; Level: International Series; Prize: $10,000; Format: 32MS/32WS/16MD/8WD/16XD	Score: 21–17, 21–10	
23 September	Guatemala International: Host: Guatemala City, Guatemala; Venue: Gimnasio Teodoro Palacios Flores; Level: International Series; Prize: $10,000; Format: 32MS/32WS/16MD/8WD/16XD	(Brazil) Jaqueline Lima (Brazil) Sâmia Lima	(Peru) Daniela Macías (Peru) Dánica Nishimura
23 September	Guatemala International: Host: Guatemala City, Guatemala; Venue: Gimnasio Teodoro Palacios Flores; Level: International Series; Prize: $10,000; Format: 32MS/32WS/16MD/8WD/16XD	Score: 21–19, 21–13	
23 September	Guatemala International: Host: Guatemala City, Guatemala; Venue: Gimnasio Teodoro Palacios Flores; Level: International Series; Prize: $10,000; Format: 32MS/32WS/16MD/8WD/16XD	(Brazil) Fabricio Farias (Brazil) Jaqueline Lima	(Guatemala) Jonathan Solís (Guatemala) Diana Corleto
23 September	Guatemala International: Host: Guatemala City, Guatemala; Venue: Gimnasio Teodoro Palacios Flores; Level: International Series; Prize: $10,000; Format: 32MS/32WS/16MD/8WD/16XD	Score: Walkover	
23 September	Czech Open: Host: Brno, Czech Republic; Venue: Sportovni hala Vodova; Level: Future Series; Format: 32MS/32WS/32MD/32WD/32XD	(Republic of Ireland) Jonathan Dolan	(England) David Jones
23 September	Czech Open: Host: Brno, Czech Republic; Venue: Sportovni hala Vodova; Level: Future Series; Format: 32MS/32WS/32MD/32WD/32XD	Score: 22–20, 21–9	
23 September	Czech Open: Host: Brno, Czech Republic; Venue: Sportovni hala Vodova; Level: Future Series; Format: 32MS/32WS/32MD/32WD/32XD	(England) Abigail Holden	(Hungary) Réka Madarász
23 September	Czech Open: Host: Brno, Czech Republic; Venue: Sportovni hala Vodova; Level: Future Series; Format: 32MS/32WS/32MD/32WD/32XD	Score: 21–14, 18–21, 21–15	
23 September	Czech Open: Host: Brno, Czech Republic; Venue: Sportovni hala Vodova; Level: Future Series; Format: 32MS/32WS/32MD/32WD/32XD	(Republic of Ireland) Joshua Magee (Republic of Ireland) Paul Reynolds	(Norway) Torjus Flåtten (Norway) Vegard Rikheim
23 September	Czech Open: Host: Brno, Czech Republic; Venue: Sportovni hala Vodova; Level: Future Series; Format: 32MS/32WS/32MD/32WD/32XD	Score: 21–16, 21–18	
23 September	Czech Open: Host: Brno, Czech Republic; Venue: Sportovni hala Vodova; Level: Future Series; Format: 32MS/32WS/32MD/32WD/32XD	(Germany) Lisa Kaminski (Germany) Hannah Pohl	(Czech Republic) Alžběta Bášová (Czech Republic) Michaela Fuchsová
23 September	Czech Open: Host: Brno, Czech Republic; Venue: Sportovni hala Vodova; Level: Future Series; Format: 32MS/32WS/32MD/32WD/32XD	Score: 23–21, 21–14	
23 September	Czech Open: Host: Brno, Czech Republic; Venue: Sportovni hala Vodova; Level: Future Series; Format: 32MS/32WS/32MD/32WD/32XD	(Czech Republic) Jakub Bitman (Czech Republic) Alžběta Bášová	(France) William Villeger (France) Sharone Bauer
23 September	Czech Open: Host: Brno, Czech Republic; Venue: Sportovni hala Vodova; Level: Future Series; Format: 32MS/32WS/32MD/32WD/32XD	Score: 21–15, 23–21	
30 September	World Junior Championships (Draw): Host: Kazan, Russia; Venue: Kazan Gymnastics Center; Level: World Junior Mixed Team Championships; Format: 43 teams	Indonesia	China
30 September	World Junior Championships (Draw): Host: Kazan, Russia; Venue: Kazan Gymnastics Center; Level: World Junior Mixed Team Championships; Format: 43 teams	Daniel Marthin / Indah Cahya Sari Jamil; Putri Kusuma Wardani; Bobby Setiabudi; Febriana Dwipuji Kusuma / Putri Syaikah; Leo Rolly Carnando / Daniel Marthin	Feng Yanzhe / Lin Fangling; Zhou Meng; Liu Liang; Li Yijing / Tan Ning; Di Zijian / Wang Chang
30 September	World Junior Championships (Draw): Host: Kazan, Russia; Venue: Kazan Gymnastics Center; Level: World Junior Mixed Team Championships; Format: 43 teams	Score: 3–1	
30 September	Indonesia Masters Super 100 (Draw): Host: Malang, East Java, Indonesia; Venue: Ken Arok Sports Hall; Level: Super 100; Prize: $75,000; Format: 64MS/32WS/32MD/32WD/32XD	(China) Sun Feixiang	(Thailand) Tanongsak Saensomboonsuk
30 September	Indonesia Masters Super 100 (Draw): Host: Malang, East Java, Indonesia; Venue: Ken Arok Sports Hall; Level: Super 100; Prize: $75,000; Format: 64MS/32WS/32MD/32WD/32XD	Score: 21–19, 21–14	
30 September	Indonesia Masters Super 100 (Draw): Host: Malang, East Java, Indonesia; Venue: Ken Arok Sports Hall; Level: Super 100; Prize: $75,000; Format: 64MS/32WS/32MD/32WD/32XD	(China) Wang Zhiyi	(Thailand) Porntip Buranaprasertsuk
30 September	Indonesia Masters Super 100 (Draw): Host: Malang, East Java, Indonesia; Venue: Ken Arok Sports Hall; Level: Super 100; Prize: $75,000; Format: 64MS/32WS/32MD/32WD/32XD	Score: 20–22, 21–15, 21–13	
30 September	Indonesia Masters Super 100 (Draw): Host: Malang, East Java, Indonesia; Venue: Ken Arok Sports Hall; Level: Super 100; Prize: $75,000; Format: 64MS/32WS/32MD/32WD/32XD	(China) Ou Xuanyi (China) Zhang Nan	(Japan) Akira Koga (Japan) Taichi Saito
30 September	Indonesia Masters Super 100 (Draw): Host: Malang, East Java, Indonesia; Venue: Ken Arok Sports Hall; Level: Super 100; Prize: $75,000; Format: 64MS/32WS/32MD/32WD/32XD	Score: 11–21, 21–10, 22–20	
30 September	Indonesia Masters Super 100 (Draw): Host: Malang, East Java, Indonesia; Venue: Ken Arok Sports Hall; Level: Super 100; Prize: $75,000; Format: 64MS/32WS/32MD/32WD/32XD	(Indonesia) Siti Fadia Silva Ramadhanti (Indonesia) Ribka Sugiarto	(Indonesia) Della Destiara Haris (Indonesia) Rizki Amelia Pradipta
30 September	Indonesia Masters Super 100 (Draw): Host: Malang, East Java, Indonesia; Venue: Ken Arok Sports Hall; Level: Super 100; Prize: $75,000; Format: 64MS/32WS/32MD/32WD/32XD	Score: 23–21, 21–15	
30 September	Indonesia Masters Super 100 (Draw): Host: Malang, East Java, Indonesia; Venue: Ken Arok Sports Hall; Level: Super 100; Prize: $75,000; Format: 64MS/32WS/32MD/32WD/32XD	(China) Guo Xinwa (China) Zhang Shuxian	(Indonesia) Adnan Maulana (Indonesia) Mychelle Crhystine Bandaso
30 September	Indonesia Masters Super 100 (Draw): Host: Malang, East Java, Indonesia; Venue: Ken Arok Sports Hall; Level: Super 100; Prize: $75,000; Format: 64MS/32WS/32MD/32WD/32XD	Score: 21–18, 16–21, 28–26	
30 September	Bulgarian International: Host: Sofia, Bulgaria; Venue: Badminton Hall "Europe"; Level: Future Series; Format: 32MS/32WS/32MD/8WD/16XD	(Bulgaria) Dimitar Yanakiev	(Finland) Joonas Korhonen
30 September	Bulgarian International: Host: Sofia, Bulgaria; Venue: Badminton Hall "Europe"; Level: Future Series; Format: 32MS/32WS/32MD/8WD/16XD	Score: 21–9, 21–14	
30 September	Bulgarian International: Host: Sofia, Bulgaria; Venue: Badminton Hall "Europe"; Level: Future Series; Format: 32MS/32WS/32MD/8WD/16XD	(Sweden) Rebecca Kuhl	(Estonia) Getter Saar
30 September	Bulgarian International: Host: Sofia, Bulgaria; Venue: Badminton Hall "Europe"; Level: Future Series; Format: 32MS/32WS/32MD/8WD/16XD	Score: 21–16, 21–16	
30 September	Bulgarian International: Host: Sofia, Bulgaria; Venue: Badminton Hall "Europe"; Level: Future Series; Format: 32MS/32WS/32MD/8WD/16XD	(Austria) Philip Birker (Austria) Dominik Stipsits	(Finland) Anton Monnberg (Finland) Jasper Paul
30 September	Bulgarian International: Host: Sofia, Bulgaria; Venue: Badminton Hall "Europe"; Level: Future Series; Format: 32MS/32WS/32MD/8WD/16XD	Score: 21–19, 14–21, 23–21	
30 September	Bulgarian International: Host: Sofia, Bulgaria; Venue: Badminton Hall "Europe"; Level: Future Series; Format: 32MS/32WS/32MD/8WD/16XD	(Austria) Serena Au Yeong (Austria) Katharina Hochmeir	(Bulgaria) Tanya Ivanova (Bulgaria) Gergana Pavlova
30 September	Bulgarian International: Host: Sofia, Bulgaria; Venue: Badminton Hall "Europe"; Level: Future Series; Format: 32MS/32WS/32MD/8WD/16XD	Score: 21–15, 21–18	
30 September	Bulgarian International: Host: Sofia, Bulgaria; Venue: Badminton Hall "Europe"; Level: Future Series; Format: 32MS/32WS/32MD/8WD/16XD	(Bulgaria) Stilian Makarski (Bulgaria) Diana Dimova	(Finland) Julius Von Pfaler (Finland) Jenny Nyström
30 September	Bulgarian International: Host: Sofia, Bulgaria; Venue: Badminton Hall "Europe"; Level: Future Series; Format: 32MS/32WS/32MD/8WD/16XD	Score: 17–21, 21–13, 21–17	

=== October ===
Week commencing	Tournament	Champions	Runners-up
7 October	World Junior Championships (Draw): Host: Kazan, Russia; Venue: Kazan Gymnastics Center; Level: World Junior Championships; Format: 256MS/128WS/128MD/128WD/128XD	(Thailand) Kunlavut Vitidsarn	(France) Christo Popov
7 October	World Junior Championships (Draw): Host: Kazan, Russia; Venue: Kazan Gymnastics Center; Level: World Junior Championships; Format: 256MS/128WS/128MD/128WD/128XD	Score: 21–8, 21–11	
7 October	World Junior Championships (Draw): Host: Kazan, Russia; Venue: Kazan Gymnastics Center; Level: World Junior Championships; Format: 256MS/128WS/128MD/128WD/128XD	(Japan) Riko Gunji	(China) Zhou Meng
7 October	World Junior Championships (Draw): Host: Kazan, Russia; Venue: Kazan Gymnastics Center; Level: World Junior Championships; Format: 256MS/128WS/128MD/128WD/128XD	Score: 21–13, 12–21, 21–14	
7 October	World Junior Championships (Draw): Host: Kazan, Russia; Venue: Kazan Gymnastics Center; Level: World Junior Championships; Format: 256MS/128WS/128MD/128WD/128XD	(Indonesia) Leo Rolly Carnando (Indonesia) Daniel Marthin	(China) Di Zijian (China) Wang Chang
7 October	World Junior Championships (Draw): Host: Kazan, Russia; Venue: Kazan Gymnastics Center; Level: World Junior Championships; Format: 256MS/128WS/128MD/128WD/128XD	Score: 21–19, 21–18	
7 October	World Junior Championships (Draw): Host: Kazan, Russia; Venue: Kazan Gymnastics Center; Level: World Junior Championships; Format: 256MS/128WS/128MD/128WD/128XD	(China) Lin Fangling (China) Zhou Xinru	(Indonesia) Febriana Dwipuji Kusuma (Indonesia) Amalia Cahaya Pratiwi
7 October	World Junior Championships (Draw): Host: Kazan, Russia; Venue: Kazan Gymnastics Center; Level: World Junior Championships; Format: 256MS/128WS/128MD/128WD/128XD	Score: 22–20, 11–21, 21–14	
7 October	World Junior Championships (Draw): Host: Kazan, Russia; Venue: Kazan Gymnastics Center; Level: World Junior Championships; Format: 256MS/128WS/128MD/128WD/128XD	(China) Feng Yanzhe (China) Lin Fangling	(Indonesia) Leo Rolly Carnando (Indonesia) Indah Cahya Sari Jamil
7 October	World Junior Championships (Draw): Host: Kazan, Russia; Venue: Kazan Gymnastics Center; Level: World Junior Championships; Format: 256MS/128WS/128MD/128WD/128XD	Score: 21–17, 21–17	
7 October	Dutch Open (Draw): Host: Almere, Netherlands; Venue: Topsportcentrum; Level: Super 100; Prize: $75,000; Format: 64MS/32WS/32MD/32WD/32XD	(India) Lakshya Sen	(Japan) Yusuke Onodera
7 October	Dutch Open (Draw): Host: Almere, Netherlands; Venue: Topsportcentrum; Level: Super 100; Prize: $75,000; Format: 64MS/32WS/32MD/32WD/32XD	Score: 15–21, 21–14, 21–15	
7 October	Dutch Open (Draw): Host: Almere, Netherlands; Venue: Topsportcentrum; Level: Super 100; Prize: $75,000; Format: 64MS/32WS/32MD/32WD/32XD	(China) Wang Zhiyi	(Russia) Evgeniya Kosetskaya
7 October	Dutch Open (Draw): Host: Almere, Netherlands; Venue: Topsportcentrum; Level: Super 100; Prize: $75,000; Format: 64MS/32WS/32MD/32WD/32XD	Score: 21–14, 21–18	
7 October	Dutch Open (Draw): Host: Almere, Netherlands; Venue: Topsportcentrum; Level: Super 100; Prize: $75,000; Format: 64MS/32WS/32MD/32WD/32XD	(Russia) Vladimir Ivanov (Russia) Ivan Sozonov	(Germany) Mark Lamsfuß (Germany) Marvin Emil Seidel
7 October	Dutch Open (Draw): Host: Almere, Netherlands; Venue: Topsportcentrum; Level: Super 100; Prize: $75,000; Format: 64MS/32WS/32MD/32WD/32XD	Score: 21–19, 21–16	
7 October	Dutch Open (Draw): Host: Almere, Netherlands; Venue: Topsportcentrum; Level: Super 100; Prize: $75,000; Format: 64MS/32WS/32MD/32WD/32XD	(Bulgaria) Gabriela Stoeva (Bulgaria) Stefani Stoeva	(Japan) Rin Iwanaga (Japan) Kie Nakanishi
7 October	Dutch Open (Draw): Host: Almere, Netherlands; Venue: Topsportcentrum; Level: Super 100; Prize: $75,000; Format: 64MS/32WS/32MD/32WD/32XD	Score: 21–10, 22–20	
7 October	Dutch Open (Draw): Host: Almere, Netherlands; Venue: Topsportcentrum; Level: Super 100; Prize: $75,000; Format: 64MS/32WS/32MD/32WD/32XD	(Netherlands) Robin Tabeling (Netherlands) Selena Piek	(England) Chris Adcock (England) Gabby Adcock
7 October	Dutch Open (Draw): Host: Almere, Netherlands; Venue: Topsportcentrum; Level: Super 100; Prize: $75,000; Format: 64MS/32WS/32MD/32WD/32XD	Score: 21–17, 21–13	
7 October	Bahrain International: Host: Isa Town, Bahrain; Venue: Khalifa Sport City; Level: International Series; Prize: $10,000; Format: 64MS/32WS/16MD/8WD/32XD	(India) Priyanshu Rajawat	(Canada) Jason Anthony Ho-Shue
7 October	Bahrain International: Host: Isa Town, Bahrain; Venue: Khalifa Sport City; Level: International Series; Prize: $10,000; Format: 64MS/32WS/16MD/8WD/32XD	Score: 16–21, 21–7, 21–12	
7 October	Bahrain International: Host: Isa Town, Bahrain; Venue: Khalifa Sport City; Level: International Series; Prize: $10,000; Format: 64MS/32WS/16MD/8WD/32XD	(Indonesia) Sri Fatmawati	(India) Ira Sharma
7 October	Bahrain International: Host: Isa Town, Bahrain; Venue: Khalifa Sport City; Level: International Series; Prize: $10,000; Format: 64MS/32WS/16MD/8WD/32XD	Score: 21–14, 24–22	
7 October	Bahrain International: Host: Isa Town, Bahrain; Venue: Khalifa Sport City; Level: International Series; Prize: $10,000; Format: 64MS/32WS/16MD/8WD/32XD	(Thailand) Prad Tangsrirapeephan (Thailand) Apichasit Teerawiwat	(India) Rohan Kapoor (India) Saurabh Sharma
7 October	Bahrain International: Host: Isa Town, Bahrain; Venue: Khalifa Sport City; Level: International Series; Prize: $10,000; Format: 64MS/32WS/16MD/8WD/32XD	Score: 19–21, 21–16, 24–22	
7 October	Bahrain International: Host: Isa Town, Bahrain; Venue: Khalifa Sport City; Level: International Series; Prize: $10,000; Format: 64MS/32WS/16MD/8WD/32XD	(Peru) Daniela Macías (Peru) Dánica Nishimura	(Thailand) Suthinee Dansoonthornwong (Thailand) Kanyanat Sudchoeichom
7 October	Bahrain International: Host: Isa Town, Bahrain; Venue: Khalifa Sport City; Level: International Series; Prize: $10,000; Format: 64MS/32WS/16MD/8WD/32XD	Score: 18–21, 21–16, 21–17	
7 October	Bahrain International: Host: Isa Town, Bahrain; Venue: Khalifa Sport City; Level: International Series; Prize: $10,000; Format: 64MS/32WS/16MD/8WD/32XD	(India) Venkat Gaurav Prasad (India) Juhi Dewangan	(Thailand) Pannawat Theerapanitnun (Thailand) Kanyanat Sudchoeichom
7 October	Bahrain International: Host: Isa Town, Bahrain; Venue: Khalifa Sport City; Level: International Series; Prize: $10,000; Format: 64MS/32WS/16MD/8WD/32XD	Score: 21–18, 21–16	
7 October	Brazil International: Host: Campinas, São Paulo, Brazil; Venue: Clube Fonte São Paulo; Level: International Series; Prize: $10,000; Format: 32MS/32WS/16MD/16WD/16XD	(Guatemala) Kevin Cordón	(Mexico) Lino Muñoz
7 October	Brazil International: Host: Campinas, São Paulo, Brazil; Venue: Clube Fonte São Paulo; Level: International Series; Prize: $10,000; Format: 32MS/32WS/16MD/16WD/16XD	Score: 21–19, 21–19	
7 October	Brazil International: Host: Campinas, São Paulo, Brazil; Venue: Clube Fonte São Paulo; Level: International Series; Prize: $10,000; Format: 32MS/32WS/16MD/16WD/16XD	(Brazil) Jaqueline Lima	(Mexico) Haramara Gaitan
7 October	Brazil International: Host: Campinas, São Paulo, Brazil; Venue: Clube Fonte São Paulo; Level: International Series; Prize: $10,000; Format: 32MS/32WS/16MD/16WD/16XD	Score: 21–8, 26–24	
7 October	Brazil International: Host: Campinas, São Paulo, Brazil; Venue: Clube Fonte São Paulo; Level: International Series; Prize: $10,000; Format: 32MS/32WS/16MD/16WD/16XD	(Brazil) Fabrício Farias (Brazil) Francielton Farias	(Brazil) Waleson Vinicios Evangeli Santos (Brazil) Matheus Voigt
7 October	Brazil International: Host: Campinas, São Paulo, Brazil; Venue: Clube Fonte São Paulo; Level: International Series; Prize: $10,000; Format: 32MS/32WS/16MD/16WD/16XD	Score: 21–12, 21–11	
7 October	Brazil International: Host: Campinas, São Paulo, Brazil; Venue: Clube Fonte São Paulo; Level: International Series; Prize: $10,000; Format: 32MS/32WS/16MD/16WD/16XD	(Brazil) Jaqueline Lima (Brazil) Sâmia Lima	(Brazil) Mariana Pedrol Freitas (Brazil) Bianca Oliveira Lima
7 October	Brazil International: Host: Campinas, São Paulo, Brazil; Venue: Clube Fonte São Paulo; Level: International Series; Prize: $10,000; Format: 32MS/32WS/16MD/16WD/16XD	Score: 21–7, 21–10	
7 October	Brazil International: Host: Campinas, São Paulo, Brazil; Venue: Clube Fonte São Paulo; Level: International Series; Prize: $10,000; Format: 32MS/32WS/16MD/16WD/16XD	(Brazil) Fabrício Farias (Brazil) Jaqueline Lima	(Brazil) Francielton Farias (Brazil) Sâmia Lima
7 October	Brazil International: Host: Campinas, São Paulo, Brazil; Venue: Clube Fonte São Paulo; Level: International Series; Prize: $10,000; Format: 32MS/32WS/16MD/16WD/16XD	Score: 21–18, 21–18	
7 October	Cyprus International: Host: Nicosia, Cyprus; Venue: Agios Dometios Sports Center; Level: Future Series; Format: 32MS/32WS/16MD/16WD/16XD	(Republic of Ireland) Jonathan Dolan	(England) Alex Lane
7 October	Cyprus International: Host: Nicosia, Cyprus; Venue: Agios Dometios Sports Center; Level: Future Series; Format: 32MS/32WS/16MD/16WD/16XD	Score: 15–4 Retired	
7 October	Cyprus International: Host: Nicosia, Cyprus; Venue: Agios Dometios Sports Center; Level: Future Series; Format: 32MS/32WS/16MD/16WD/16XD	(Switzerland) Jenjira Stadelmann	(Hungary) Réka Madarász
7 October	Cyprus International: Host: Nicosia, Cyprus; Venue: Agios Dometios Sports Center; Level: Future Series; Format: 32MS/32WS/16MD/16WD/16XD	Score: 21–11, 21–17	
7 October	Cyprus International: Host: Nicosia, Cyprus; Venue: Agios Dometios Sports Center; Level: Future Series; Format: 32MS/32WS/16MD/16WD/16XD	(Norway) Torjus Flaatten (Norway) Vegard Rikheim	(Switzerland) Nicolas Müller (Switzerland) Julien Scheiwiller
7 October	Cyprus International: Host: Nicosia, Cyprus; Venue: Agios Dometios Sports Center; Level: Future Series; Format: 32MS/32WS/16MD/16WD/16XD	Score: 21–19, 21–18	
7 October	Cyprus International: Host: Nicosia, Cyprus; Venue: Agios Dometios Sports Center; Level: Future Series; Format: 32MS/32WS/16MD/16WD/16XD	(Hungary) Daniella Gonda (Hungary) Ágnes Körösi	(Italy) Katharina Fink (Italy) Yasmine Hamza
7 October	Cyprus International: Host: Nicosia, Cyprus; Venue: Agios Dometios Sports Center; Level: Future Series; Format: 32MS/32WS/16MD/16WD/16XD	Score: 21–12, 12–21, 21–19	
7 October	Cyprus International: Host: Nicosia, Cyprus; Venue: Agios Dometios Sports Center; Level: Future Series; Format: 32MS/32WS/16MD/16WD/16XD	(Switzerland) Tobias Künzi (Switzerland) Jenjira Stadelmann	(Ukraine) Mykhaylo Makhnovskiy (Ukraine) Anastasiya Prozorova
7 October	Cyprus International: Host: Nicosia, Cyprus; Venue: Agios Dometios Sports Center; Level: Future Series; Format: 32MS/32WS/16MD/16WD/16XD	Score: 21–11, 21–14	
14 October	Denmark Open (Draw): Host: Odense, Denmark; Venue: Odense Sports Park; Level: Super 750; Prize: $775,000; Format: 32MS/32WS/32MD/32WD/32XD	(Japan) Kento Momota	(China) Chen Long
14 October	Denmark Open (Draw): Host: Odense, Denmark; Venue: Odense Sports Park; Level: Super 750; Prize: $775,000; Format: 32MS/32WS/32MD/32WD/32XD	Score: 21–14, 21–12	
14 October	Denmark Open (Draw): Host: Odense, Denmark; Venue: Odense Sports Park; Level: Super 750; Prize: $775,000; Format: 32MS/32WS/32MD/32WD/32XD	(Chinese Taipei) Tai Tzu-ying	(Japan) Nozomi Okuhara
14 October	Denmark Open (Draw): Host: Odense, Denmark; Venue: Odense Sports Park; Level: Super 750; Prize: $775,000; Format: 32MS/32WS/32MD/32WD/32XD	Score: 21–17, 21–14	
14 October	Denmark Open (Draw): Host: Odense, Denmark; Venue: Odense Sports Park; Level: Super 750; Prize: $775,000; Format: 32MS/32WS/32MD/32WD/32XD	(Indonesia) Marcus Fernaldi Gideon (Indonesia) Kevin Sanjaya Sukamuljo	(Indonesia) Mohammad Ahsan (Indonesia) Hendra Setiawan
14 October	Denmark Open (Draw): Host: Odense, Denmark; Venue: Odense Sports Park; Level: Super 750; Prize: $775,000; Format: 32MS/32WS/32MD/32WD/32XD	Score: 21–14, 21–13	
14 October	Denmark Open (Draw): Host: Odense, Denmark; Venue: Odense Sports Park; Level: Super 750; Prize: $775,000; Format: 32MS/32WS/32MD/32WD/32XD	(South Korea) Baek Ha-na (South Korea) Jung Kyung-eun	(China) Chen Qingchen (China) Jia Yifan
14 October	Denmark Open (Draw): Host: Odense, Denmark; Venue: Odense Sports Park; Level: Super 750; Prize: $775,000; Format: 32MS/32WS/32MD/32WD/32XD	Score: 9–21, 21–19, 21–15	
14 October	Denmark Open (Draw): Host: Odense, Denmark; Venue: Odense Sports Park; Level: Super 750; Prize: $775,000; Format: 32MS/32WS/32MD/32WD/32XD	(Indonesia) Praveen Jordan (Indonesia) Melati Daeva Oktavianti	(China) Wang Yilü (China) Huang Dongping
14 October	Denmark Open (Draw): Host: Odense, Denmark; Venue: Odense Sports Park; Level: Super 750; Prize: $775,000; Format: 32MS/32WS/32MD/32WD/32XD	Score: 21–18, 18–21, 21–19	
14 October	Dubai International: Host: Dubai, United Arab Emirates; Venue: NAS Sports Complex; Level: International Challenge; Prize: $25,000; Format: 64MS/64WS/32MD/16WD/32XD	(Japan) Kodai Naraoka	(Japan) Yusuke Onodera
14 October	Dubai International: Host: Dubai, United Arab Emirates; Venue: NAS Sports Complex; Level: International Challenge; Prize: $25,000; Format: 64MS/64WS/32MD/16WD/32XD	Score: 21–14, 21–17	
14 October	Dubai International: Host: Dubai, United Arab Emirates; Venue: NAS Sports Complex; Level: International Challenge; Prize: $25,000; Format: 64MS/64WS/32MD/16WD/32XD	(Japan) Mako Urushizaki	(India) Rituparna Das
14 October	Dubai International: Host: Dubai, United Arab Emirates; Venue: NAS Sports Complex; Level: International Challenge; Prize: $25,000; Format: 64MS/64WS/32MD/16WD/32XD	Score: 23–21, 21–17	
14 October	Dubai International: Host: Dubai, United Arab Emirates; Venue: NAS Sports Complex; Level: International Challenge; Prize: $25,000; Format: 64MS/64WS/32MD/16WD/32XD	(Japan) Keiichiro Matsui (Japan) Yoshinori Takeuchi	(Malaysia) Shia Chun Kang (Malaysia) Tan Boon Heong
14 October	Dubai International: Host: Dubai, United Arab Emirates; Venue: NAS Sports Complex; Level: International Challenge; Prize: $25,000; Format: 64MS/64WS/32MD/16WD/32XD	Score: 21–14, 21–14	
14 October	Dubai International: Host: Dubai, United Arab Emirates; Venue: NAS Sports Complex; Level: International Challenge; Prize: $25,000; Format: 64MS/64WS/32MD/16WD/32XD	(Japan) Rin Iwanaga (Japan) Kie Nakanishi	(Denmark) Alexandra Bøje (Denmark) Mette Poulsen
14 October	Dubai International: Host: Dubai, United Arab Emirates; Venue: NAS Sports Complex; Level: International Challenge; Prize: $25,000; Format: 64MS/64WS/32MD/16WD/32XD	Score: 18–21, 21–15, 21–17	
14 October	Dubai International: Host: Dubai, United Arab Emirates; Venue: NAS Sports Complex; Level: International Challenge; Prize: $25,000; Format: 64MS/64WS/32MD/16WD/32XD	(Russia) Rodion Alimov (Russia) Alina Davletova	(South Korea) Kim Sa-rang (South Korea) Kim Ha-na
14 October	Dubai International: Host: Dubai, United Arab Emirates; Venue: NAS Sports Complex; Level: International Challenge; Prize: $25,000; Format: 64MS/64WS/32MD/16WD/32XD	Score: 22–20, 21–16	
14 October	Egypt International: Host: Cairo, Egypt; Venue: Egyptian Badminton Federation Buildings; Level: International Series; Prize: $10,000; Format: 32MS/32WS/32MD/32WD/32XD	(Azerbaijan) Ade Resky Dwicahyo	(Czech Republic) Milan Ludik
14 October	Egypt International: Host: Cairo, Egypt; Venue: Egyptian Badminton Federation Buildings; Level: International Series; Prize: $10,000; Format: 32MS/32WS/32MD/32WD/32XD	Score: 21–17, 21–12	
14 October	Egypt International: Host: Cairo, Egypt; Venue: Egyptian Badminton Federation Buildings; Level: International Series; Prize: $10,000; Format: 32MS/32WS/32MD/32WD/32XD	(Myanmar) Thet Htar Thuzar	(Wales) Jordan Hart
14 October	Egypt International: Host: Cairo, Egypt; Venue: Egyptian Badminton Federation Buildings; Level: International Series; Prize: $10,000; Format: 32MS/32WS/32MD/32WD/32XD	Score: 21–6, 12–1 Retired	
14 October	Egypt International: Host: Cairo, Egypt; Venue: Egyptian Badminton Federation Buildings; Level: International Series; Prize: $10,000; Format: 32MS/32WS/32MD/32WD/32XD	(Algeria) Koceila Mammeri (Algeria) Youcef Sabri Medel	(Poland) Paweł Pietryja (Poland) Jan Rudziński
14 October	Egypt International: Host: Cairo, Egypt; Venue: Egyptian Badminton Federation Buildings; Level: International Series; Prize: $10,000; Format: 32MS/32WS/32MD/32WD/32XD	Score: 21–19, 24–22	
14 October	Egypt International: Host: Cairo, Egypt; Venue: Egyptian Badminton Federation Buildings; Level: International Series; Prize: $10,000; Format: 32MS/32WS/32MD/32WD/32XD	(India) Simran Singhi (India) Ritika Thaker	(India) Kuhoo Garg (India) Sanyogita Ghorpade
14 October	Egypt International: Host: Cairo, Egypt; Venue: Egyptian Badminton Federation Buildings; Level: International Series; Prize: $10,000; Format: 32MS/32WS/32MD/32WD/32XD	Score: 21–16, 19–21, 21–19	
14 October	Egypt International: Host: Cairo, Egypt; Venue: Egyptian Badminton Federation Buildings; Level: International Series; Prize: $10,000; Format: 32MS/32WS/32MD/32WD/32XD	(India) Dhruv Rawat (India) Kuhoo Garg	(India) Utkarsh Arora (India) Karishma Wadkar
14 October	Egypt International: Host: Cairo, Egypt; Venue: Egyptian Badminton Federation Buildings; Level: International Series; Prize: $10,000; Format: 32MS/32WS/32MD/32WD/32XD	Score: 21–16, 22–20	
21 October	French Open (Draw): Host: Paris, France; Venue: Stade Pierre de Coubertin; Level: Super 750; Prize: $750,000; Format: 32MS/32WS/32MD/32WD/32XD	(China) Chen Long	(Indonesia) Jonatan Christie
21 October	French Open (Draw): Host: Paris, France; Venue: Stade Pierre de Coubertin; Level: Super 750; Prize: $750,000; Format: 32MS/32WS/32MD/32WD/32XD	Score: 21–19, 21–12	
21 October	French Open (Draw): Host: Paris, France; Venue: Stade Pierre de Coubertin; Level: Super 750; Prize: $750,000; Format: 32MS/32WS/32MD/32WD/32XD	(South Korea) An Se-young	(Spain) Carolina Marín
21 October	French Open (Draw): Host: Paris, France; Venue: Stade Pierre de Coubertin; Level: Super 750; Prize: $750,000; Format: 32MS/32WS/32MD/32WD/32XD	Score: 16–21, 21–18, 21–5	
21 October	French Open (Draw): Host: Paris, France; Venue: Stade Pierre de Coubertin; Level: Super 750; Prize: $750,000; Format: 32MS/32WS/32MD/32WD/32XD	(Indonesia) Marcus Fernaldi Gideon (Indonesia) Kevin Sanjaya Sukamuljo	(India) Satwiksairaj Rankireddy (India) Chirag Shetty
21 October	French Open (Draw): Host: Paris, France; Venue: Stade Pierre de Coubertin; Level: Super 750; Prize: $750,000; Format: 32MS/32WS/32MD/32WD/32XD	Score: 21–18, 21–16	
21 October	French Open (Draw): Host: Paris, France; Venue: Stade Pierre de Coubertin; Level: Super 750; Prize: $750,000; Format: 32MS/32WS/32MD/32WD/32XD	(South Korea) Lee So-hee (South Korea) Shin Seung-chan	(South Korea) Kim So-yeong (South Korea) Kong Hee-yong
21 October	French Open (Draw): Host: Paris, France; Venue: Stade Pierre de Coubertin; Level: Super 750; Prize: $750,000; Format: 32MS/32WS/32MD/32WD/32XD	Score: 16–21, 21–19, 21–12	
21 October	French Open (Draw): Host: Paris, France; Venue: Stade Pierre de Coubertin; Level: Super 750; Prize: $750,000; Format: 32MS/32WS/32MD/32WD/32XD	(Indonesia) Praveen Jordan (Indonesia) Melati Daeva Oktavianti	(China) Zheng Siwei (China) Huang Yaqiong
21 October	French Open (Draw): Host: Paris, France; Venue: Stade Pierre de Coubertin; Level: Super 750; Prize: $750,000; Format: 32MS/32WS/32MD/32WD/32XD	Score: 22–24, 21–16, 21–12	
21 October	Indonesia International: Host: Magelang, Central Java, Indonesia; Venue: Djarum Badminton Hall; Level: International Challenge; Prize: $25,000; Format: 64MS/32WS/32MD/32WD/32XD	(Indonesia) Ikhsan Rumbay	(Indonesia) Sony Dwi Kuncoro
21 October	Indonesia International: Host: Magelang, Central Java, Indonesia; Venue: Djarum Badminton Hall; Level: International Challenge; Prize: $25,000; Format: 64MS/32WS/32MD/32WD/32XD	Score: 21–13, 21–15	
21 October	Indonesia International: Host: Magelang, Central Java, Indonesia; Venue: Djarum Badminton Hall; Level: International Challenge; Prize: $25,000; Format: 64MS/32WS/32MD/32WD/32XD	(Japan) Asuka Takahashi	(Japan) Hirari Mizui
21 October	Indonesia International: Host: Magelang, Central Java, Indonesia; Venue: Djarum Badminton Hall; Level: International Challenge; Prize: $25,000; Format: 64MS/32WS/32MD/32WD/32XD	Score: 21–16, 21–15	
21 October	Indonesia International: Host: Magelang, Central Java, Indonesia; Venue: Djarum Badminton Hall; Level: International Challenge; Prize: $25,000; Format: 64MS/32WS/32MD/32WD/32XD	(South Korea) Kang Min-hyuk (South Korea) Kim Jae-hwan	(Indonesia) Muhammad Fachrikar (Indonesia) Amri Syahnawi
21 October	Indonesia International: Host: Magelang, Central Java, Indonesia; Venue: Djarum Badminton Hall; Level: International Challenge; Prize: $25,000; Format: 64MS/32WS/32MD/32WD/32XD	Score: 21–17, 11–21, 21–15	
21 October	Indonesia International: Host: Magelang, Central Java, Indonesia; Venue: Djarum Badminton Hall; Level: International Challenge; Prize: $25,000; Format: 64MS/32WS/32MD/32WD/32XD	(Indonesia) Anggia Shitta Awanda (Indonesia) Pia Zebadiah Bernadeth	(Japan) Natsu Saito (Japan) Naru Shinoya
21 October	Indonesia International: Host: Magelang, Central Java, Indonesia; Venue: Djarum Badminton Hall; Level: International Challenge; Prize: $25,000; Format: 64MS/32WS/32MD/32WD/32XD	Score: 21–19, 21–18	
21 October	Indonesia International: Host: Magelang, Central Java, Indonesia; Venue: Djarum Badminton Hall; Level: International Challenge; Prize: $25,000; Format: 64MS/32WS/32MD/32WD/32XD	(Indonesia) Zachariah Josiahno Sumanti (Indonesia) Hediana Julimarbela	(Indonesia) Rian Agung Saputro (Indonesia) Tiara Rosalia Nuraidah
21 October	Indonesia International: Host: Magelang, Central Java, Indonesia; Venue: Djarum Badminton Hall; Level: International Challenge; Prize: $25,000; Format: 64MS/32WS/32MD/32WD/32XD	Score: 22–20, 21–14	
21 October	Santo Domingo Open: Host: Santo Domingo, Dominican Republic; Venue: Volleyball Pavilion; Level: International Series; Prize: $10,000; Format: 32MS/32WS/32MD/16WD/32XD	(Canada) Brian Yang	(Guatemala) Kevin Cordón
21 October	Santo Domingo Open: Host: Santo Domingo, Dominican Republic; Venue: Volleyball Pavilion; Level: International Series; Prize: $10,000; Format: 32MS/32WS/32MD/16WD/32XD	Score: 21–8, 21–4	
21 October	Santo Domingo Open: Host: Santo Domingo, Dominican Republic; Venue: Volleyball Pavilion; Level: International Series; Prize: $10,000; Format: 32MS/32WS/32MD/16WD/32XD	(Brazil) Fabiana Silva	(United States) Ruhi Raju
21 October	Santo Domingo Open: Host: Santo Domingo, Dominican Republic; Venue: Volleyball Pavilion; Level: International Series; Prize: $10,000; Format: 32MS/32WS/32MD/16WD/32XD	Score: 21–13, 12–21, 21–13	
21 October	Santo Domingo Open: Host: Santo Domingo, Dominican Republic; Venue: Volleyball Pavilion; Level: International Series; Prize: $10,000; Format: 32MS/32WS/32MD/16WD/32XD	(Cuba) Osleni Guerrero (Cuba) Leodannis Martínez	(Brazil) Fabrício Farias (Brazil) Francielton Farias
21 October	Santo Domingo Open: Host: Santo Domingo, Dominican Republic; Venue: Volleyball Pavilion; Level: International Series; Prize: $10,000; Format: 32MS/32WS/32MD/16WD/32XD	Score: 21–19, 21–16	
21 October	Santo Domingo Open: Host: Santo Domingo, Dominican Republic; Venue: Volleyball Pavilion; Level: International Series; Prize: $10,000; Format: 32MS/32WS/32MD/16WD/32XD	(Brazil) Jaqueline Lima (Brazil) Sâmia Lima	(Canada) Camille Leblanc (Canada) Alexandra Mocanu
21 October	Santo Domingo Open: Host: Santo Domingo, Dominican Republic; Venue: Volleyball Pavilion; Level: International Series; Prize: $10,000; Format: 32MS/32WS/32MD/16WD/32XD	Score: 21–12, 20–22, 30–29	
21 October	Santo Domingo Open: Host: Santo Domingo, Dominican Republic; Venue: Volleyball Pavilion; Level: International Series; Prize: $10,000; Format: 32MS/32WS/32MD/16WD/32XD	(Brazil) Fabrício Farias (Brazil) Jaqueline Lima	(Brazil) Francielton Farias (Brazil) Sâmia Lima
21 October	Santo Domingo Open: Host: Santo Domingo, Dominican Republic; Venue: Volleyball Pavilion; Level: International Series; Prize: $10,000; Format: 32MS/32WS/32MD/16WD/32XD	Score: 21–16, 21–16	
21 October	Algeria International: Host: Algiers, Algeria; Venue: Cite Olympique Mohamed Boudief; Level: International Series; Prize: $10,000; Format: 32MS/32WS/16MD/8WD/8XD	(Spain) Pablo Abián	(Azerbaijan) Ade Resky Dwicahyo
21 October	Algeria International: Host: Algiers, Algeria; Venue: Cite Olympique Mohamed Boudief; Level: International Series; Prize: $10,000; Format: 32MS/32WS/16MD/8WD/8XD	Score: 21–8, 21–6	
21 October	Algeria International: Host: Algiers, Algeria; Venue: Cite Olympique Mohamed Boudief; Level: International Series; Prize: $10,000; Format: 32MS/32WS/16MD/8WD/8XD	(France) Marie Batomene	(France) Yaëlle Hoyaux
21 October	Algeria International: Host: Algiers, Algeria; Venue: Cite Olympique Mohamed Boudief; Level: International Series; Prize: $10,000; Format: 32MS/32WS/16MD/8WD/8XD	Score: 21–14, 21–17	
21 October	Algeria International: Host: Algiers, Algeria; Venue: Cite Olympique Mohamed Boudief; Level: International Series; Prize: $10,000; Format: 32MS/32WS/16MD/8WD/8XD	(Algeria) Koceila Mammeri (Algeria) Youcef Sabri Medel	(Poland) Paweł Pietryja (Poland) Jan Rudziński
21 October	Algeria International: Host: Algiers, Algeria; Venue: Cite Olympique Mohamed Boudief; Level: International Series; Prize: $10,000; Format: 32MS/32WS/16MD/8WD/8XD	Score: 21–16, 21–16	
21 October	Algeria International: Host: Algiers, Algeria; Venue: Cite Olympique Mohamed Boudief; Level: International Series; Prize: $10,000; Format: 32MS/32WS/16MD/8WD/8XD	(Peru) Daniela Macías (Peru) Dánica Nishimura	(Egypt) Doha Hany (Egypt) Hadia Hosny
21 October	Algeria International: Host: Algiers, Algeria; Venue: Cite Olympique Mohamed Boudief; Level: International Series; Prize: $10,000; Format: 32MS/32WS/16MD/8WD/8XD	Score: 21–13, 21–10	
21 October	Algeria International: Host: Algiers, Algeria; Venue: Cite Olympique Mohamed Boudief; Level: International Series; Prize: $10,000; Format: 32MS/32WS/16MD/8WD/8XD	(Belgium) Jona van Nieuwkerke (Belgium) Lise Jaques	(Egypt) Adham Hatem Elgamal (Egypt) Doha Hany
21 October	Algeria International: Host: Algiers, Algeria; Venue: Cite Olympique Mohamed Boudief; Level: International Series; Prize: $10,000; Format: 32MS/32WS/16MD/8WD/8XD	Score: 21–12, 22–20	
21 October	Israel International: Host: Hatzor, Israel; Venue: Hatzor sport hall; Level: Future Series; Format: 32MS/16WS/16MD/4WD/8XD	(Germany) Felix Hammes	(Germany) Christopher Klauer
21 October	Israel International: Host: Hatzor, Israel; Venue: Hatzor sport hall; Level: Future Series; Format: 32MS/16WS/16MD/4WD/8XD	Score: 21–18, 21–19	
21 October	Israel International: Host: Hatzor, Israel; Venue: Hatzor sport hall; Level: Future Series; Format: 32MS/16WS/16MD/4WD/8XD	(Israel) Ksenia Polikarpova	(Israel) Dana Danilenko
21 October	Israel International: Host: Hatzor, Israel; Venue: Hatzor sport hall; Level: Future Series; Format: 32MS/16WS/16MD/4WD/8XD	Score: 21–15, 21–13	
21 October	Israel International: Host: Hatzor, Israel; Venue: Hatzor sport hall; Level: Future Series; Format: 32MS/16WS/16MD/4WD/8XD	(Germany) Felix Hammes (Germany) Christopher Klauer	(Ukraine) Glib Beketov (Ukraine) Mykhaylo Makhnovskiy
21 October	Israel International: Host: Hatzor, Israel; Venue: Hatzor sport hall; Level: Future Series; Format: 32MS/16WS/16MD/4WD/8XD	Score: 21–16, 21–13	
21 October	Israel International: Host: Hatzor, Israel; Venue: Hatzor sport hall; Level: Future Series; Format: 32MS/16WS/16MD/4WD/8XD	(Israel) Heli Neiman (Israel) Ksenia Polikarpova	(Israel) Yuval Pugach (Israel) Shery Rotshtein
21 October	Israel International: Host: Hatzor, Israel; Venue: Hatzor sport hall; Level: Future Series; Format: 32MS/16WS/16MD/4WD/8XD	Score: 21–15, 21–9	
21 October	Israel International: Host: Hatzor, Israel; Venue: Hatzor sport hall; Level: Future Series; Format: 32MS/16WS/16MD/4WD/8XD	(Israel) May Bar Netzer (Israel) Shery Rotshtein	(Israel) Shai Geffen (Bulgaria) Maria Delcheva
21 October	Israel International: Host: Hatzor, Israel; Venue: Hatzor sport hall; Level: Future Series; Format: 32MS/16WS/16MD/4WD/8XD	Score: 21–18, 13–21, 21–14	
28 October	Macau Open (Draw): Host: Macau; Venue: Tap Seac Multisport Pavilion; Level: Super 300; Prize: $150,000; Format: 32MS/32WS/32MD/32WD/32XD	(Thailand) Sitthikom Thammasin	(China) Shi Yuqi
28 October	Macau Open (Draw): Host: Macau; Venue: Tap Seac Multisport Pavilion; Level: Super 300; Prize: $150,000; Format: 32MS/32WS/32MD/32WD/32XD	Score: 12–21, 21–14, 21–7	
28 October	Macau Open (Draw): Host: Macau; Venue: Tap Seac Multisport Pavilion; Level: Super 300; Prize: $150,000; Format: 32MS/32WS/32MD/32WD/32XD	(Canada) Michelle Li	(China) Han Yue
28 October	Macau Open (Draw): Host: Macau; Venue: Tap Seac Multisport Pavilion; Level: Super 300; Prize: $150,000; Format: 32MS/32WS/32MD/32WD/32XD	Score: 21–18, 21–8	
28 October	Macau Open (Draw): Host: Macau; Venue: Tap Seac Multisport Pavilion; Level: Super 300; Prize: $150,000; Format: 32MS/32WS/32MD/32WD/32XD	(China) Li Junhui (China) Liu Yuchen	(China) Huang Kaixiang (China) Liu Cheng
28 October	Macau Open (Draw): Host: Macau; Venue: Tap Seac Multisport Pavilion; Level: Super 300; Prize: $150,000; Format: 32MS/32WS/32MD/32WD/32XD	Score: 21–8, 18–21, 22–20	
28 October	Macau Open (Draw): Host: Macau; Venue: Tap Seac Multisport Pavilion; Level: Super 300; Prize: $150,000; Format: 32MS/32WS/32MD/32WD/32XD	(China) Du Yue (China) Li Yinhui	(Thailand) Jongkolphan Kititharakul (Thailand) Rawinda Prajongjai
28 October	Macau Open (Draw): Host: Macau; Venue: Tap Seac Multisport Pavilion; Level: Super 300; Prize: $150,000; Format: 32MS/32WS/32MD/32WD/32XD	Score: 21–16, 10–21, 21–12	
28 October	Macau Open (Draw): Host: Macau; Venue: Tap Seac Multisport Pavilion; Level: Super 300; Prize: $150,000; Format: 32MS/32WS/32MD/32WD/32XD	(Thailand) Dechapol Puavaranukroh (Thailand) Sapsiree Taerattanachai	(Chinese Taipei) Wang Chi-lin (Chinese Taipei) Cheng Chi-ya
28 October	Macau Open (Draw): Host: Macau; Venue: Tap Seac Multisport Pavilion; Level: Super 300; Prize: $150,000; Format: 32MS/32WS/32MD/32WD/32XD	Score: 21–11, 21–8	
28 October	SaarLorLux Open (Report): Host: Saarbrücken, Germany; Venue: Saarlandhalle; Level: Super 100; Prize: $75,000; Format: 64MS/32WS/32MD/32WD/32XD	(India) Lakshya Sen	(China) Weng Hongyang
28 October	SaarLorLux Open (Report): Host: Saarbrücken, Germany; Venue: Saarlandhalle; Level: Super 100; Prize: $75,000; Format: 64MS/32WS/32MD/32WD/32XD	Score: 17–21, 21–18, 21–16	
28 October	SaarLorLux Open (Report): Host: Saarbrücken, Germany; Venue: Saarlandhalle; Level: Super 100; Prize: $75,000; Format: 64MS/32WS/32MD/32WD/32XD	(China) Li Yun	(Denmark) Line Christophersen
28 October	SaarLorLux Open (Report): Host: Saarbrücken, Germany; Venue: Saarlandhalle; Level: Super 100; Prize: $75,000; Format: 64MS/32WS/32MD/32WD/32XD	Score: 21–12, 21–13	
28 October	SaarLorLux Open (Report): Host: Saarbrücken, Germany; Venue: Saarlandhalle; Level: Super 100; Prize: $75,000; Format: 64MS/32WS/32MD/32WD/32XD	(China) Di Zijian (China) Wang Chang	(Denmark) Mathias Bay-Smidt (Denmark) Lasse Mølhede
28 October	SaarLorLux Open (Report): Host: Saarbrücken, Germany; Venue: Saarlandhalle; Level: Super 100; Prize: $75,000; Format: 64MS/32WS/32MD/32WD/32XD	Score: 21–17, 21–15	
28 October	SaarLorLux Open (Report): Host: Saarbrücken, Germany; Venue: Saarlandhalle; Level: Super 100; Prize: $75,000; Format: 64MS/32WS/32MD/32WD/32XD	(China) Liu Xuanxuan (China) Xia Yuting	(England) Chloe Birch (England) Lauren Smith
28 October	SaarLorLux Open (Report): Host: Saarbrücken, Germany; Venue: Saarlandhalle; Level: Super 100; Prize: $75,000; Format: 64MS/32WS/32MD/32WD/32XD	Score: 21–16, 21–13	
28 October	SaarLorLux Open (Report): Host: Saarbrücken, Germany; Venue: Saarlandhalle; Level: Super 100; Prize: $75,000; Format: 64MS/32WS/32MD/32WD/32XD	(China) Guo Xinwa (China) Zhang Shuxian	(China) Ren Xiangyu (China) Zhou Chaomin
28 October	SaarLorLux Open (Report): Host: Saarbrücken, Germany; Venue: Saarlandhalle; Level: Super 100; Prize: $75,000; Format: 64MS/32WS/32MD/32WD/32XD	Score: 21–18, 21–19	
28 October	Hungarian International: Host: Budaörs, Hungary; Venue: Budaörs Városi Sportshall; Level: International Challenge; Prize: $25,000; Format: 32MS/32WS/32MD/32WD/32XD	(Spain) Pablo Abián	(Denmark) Victor Svendsen
28 October	Hungarian International: Host: Budaörs, Hungary; Venue: Budaörs Városi Sportshall; Level: International Challenge; Prize: $25,000; Format: 32MS/32WS/32MD/32WD/32XD	Score: 17–21, 21–15, 21–12	
28 October	Hungarian International: Host: Budaörs, Hungary; Venue: Budaörs Városi Sportshall; Level: International Challenge; Prize: $25,000; Format: 32MS/32WS/32MD/32WD/32XD	(Turkey) Neslihan Yiğit	(Vietnam) Nguyễn Thùy Linh
28 October	Hungarian International: Host: Budaörs, Hungary; Venue: Budaörs Városi Sportshall; Level: International Challenge; Prize: $25,000; Format: 32MS/32WS/32MD/32WD/32XD	Score: 21–16, 12–21, 21–18	
28 October	Hungarian International: Host: Budaörs, Hungary; Venue: Budaörs Városi Sportshall; Level: International Challenge; Prize: $25,000; Format: 32MS/32WS/32MD/32WD/32XD	(South Korea) Kim Duk-young (South Korea) Kim Sa-rang	(Canada) Peter Briggs (Canada) Joshua Hurlburt-Yu
28 October	Hungarian International: Host: Budaörs, Hungary; Venue: Budaörs Városi Sportshall; Level: International Challenge; Prize: $25,000; Format: 32MS/32WS/32MD/32WD/32XD	Score: 21–12, 21–17	
28 October	Hungarian International: Host: Budaörs, Hungary; Venue: Budaörs Városi Sportshall; Level: International Challenge; Prize: $25,000; Format: 32MS/32WS/32MD/32WD/32XD	(Canada) Rachel Honderich (Canada) Kristen Tsai	(Sweden) Emma Karlsson (Sweden) Johanna Magnusson
28 October	Hungarian International: Host: Budaörs, Hungary; Venue: Budaörs Városi Sportshall; Level: International Challenge; Prize: $25,000; Format: 32MS/32WS/32MD/32WD/32XD	Score: 21–16, 21–16	
28 October	Hungarian International: Host: Budaörs, Hungary; Venue: Budaörs Városi Sportshall; Level: International Challenge; Prize: $25,000; Format: 32MS/32WS/32MD/32WD/32XD	(South Korea) Kim Sa-rang (South Korea) Kim Ha-na	(Denmark) Mathias Christiansen (Denmark) Alexandra Bøje
28 October	Hungarian International: Host: Budaörs, Hungary; Venue: Budaörs Városi Sportshall; Level: International Challenge; Prize: $25,000; Format: 32MS/32WS/32MD/32WD/32XD	Score: 21–12, 21–15	

=== November ===
Week commencing	Tournament	Champions	Runners-up
4 November	Fuzhou China Open (Draw): Host: Fuzhou, China; Venue: Haixia Olympic Sports Center; Level: Super 750; Prize: $700,000; Format: 32MS/32WS/32MD/32WD/32XD	(Japan) Kento Momota	(Chinese Taipei) Chou Tien-chen
4 November	Fuzhou China Open (Draw): Host: Fuzhou, China; Venue: Haixia Olympic Sports Center; Level: Super 750; Prize: $700,000; Format: 32MS/32WS/32MD/32WD/32XD	Score: 21–15, 17–21, 21–18	
4 November	Fuzhou China Open (Draw): Host: Fuzhou, China; Venue: Haixia Olympic Sports Center; Level: Super 750; Prize: $700,000; Format: 32MS/32WS/32MD/32WD/32XD	(China) Chen Yufei	(Japan) Nozomi Okuhara
4 November	Fuzhou China Open (Draw): Host: Fuzhou, China; Venue: Haixia Olympic Sports Center; Level: Super 750; Prize: $700,000; Format: 32MS/32WS/32MD/32WD/32XD	Score: 9–21, 21–12, 21–18	
4 November	Fuzhou China Open (Draw): Host: Fuzhou, China; Venue: Haixia Olympic Sports Center; Level: Super 750; Prize: $700,000; Format: 32MS/32WS/32MD/32WD/32XD	(Indonesia) Marcus Fernaldi Gideon (Indonesia) Kevin Sanjaya Sukamuljo	(Japan) Takeshi Kamura (Japan) Keigo Sonoda
4 November	Fuzhou China Open (Draw): Host: Fuzhou, China; Venue: Haixia Olympic Sports Center; Level: Super 750; Prize: $700,000; Format: 32MS/32WS/32MD/32WD/32XD	Score: 21–17, 21–9	
4 November	Fuzhou China Open (Draw): Host: Fuzhou, China; Venue: Haixia Olympic Sports Center; Level: Super 750; Prize: $700,000; Format: 32MS/32WS/32MD/32WD/32XD	(Japan) Yuki Fukushima (Japan) Sayaka Hirota	(South Korea) Lee So-hee (South Korea) Shin Seung-chan
4 November	Fuzhou China Open (Draw): Host: Fuzhou, China; Venue: Haixia Olympic Sports Center; Level: Super 750; Prize: $700,000; Format: 32MS/32WS/32MD/32WD/32XD	Score: 21–17, 21–15	
4 November	Fuzhou China Open (Draw): Host: Fuzhou, China; Venue: Haixia Olympic Sports Center; Level: Super 750; Prize: $700,000; Format: 32MS/32WS/32MD/32WD/32XD	(China) Wang Yilü (China) Huang Dongping	(China) Zheng Siwei (China) Huang Yaqiong
4 November	Fuzhou China Open (Draw): Host: Fuzhou, China; Venue: Haixia Olympic Sports Center; Level: Super 750; Prize: $700,000; Format: 32MS/32WS/32MD/32WD/32XD	Score: 21–14, 21–13	
4 November	Pakistan International: Host: Islamabad, Pakistan; Venue: Pakistan Sports Complex; Level: International Series; Prize: $10,000; Format: 32MS/32WS/16MD/16WD/16XD	(Thailand) Saran Jamsri	(Mauritius) Georges Paul
4 November	Pakistan International: Host: Islamabad, Pakistan; Venue: Pakistan Sports Complex; Level: International Series; Prize: $10,000; Format: 32MS/32WS/16MD/16WD/16XD	Score: 21–14, 21–10	
4 November	Pakistan International: Host: Islamabad, Pakistan; Venue: Pakistan Sports Complex; Level: International Series; Prize: $10,000; Format: 32MS/32WS/16MD/16WD/16XD	(Pakistan) Mahoor Shahzad	(Iran) Sorayya Aghaei
4 November	Pakistan International: Host: Islamabad, Pakistan; Venue: Pakistan Sports Complex; Level: International Series; Prize: $10,000; Format: 32MS/32WS/16MD/16WD/16XD	Score: 21–15, 16–21, 21–16	
4 November	Pakistan International: Host: Islamabad, Pakistan; Venue: Pakistan Sports Complex; Level: International Series; Prize: $10,000; Format: 32MS/32WS/16MD/16WD/16XD	(Thailand) Prad Tangsrirapeephan (Thailand) Apichasit Teerawiwat	(Nepal) Dipesh Dhami (Nepal) Ratnajit Tamang
4 November	Pakistan International: Host: Islamabad, Pakistan; Venue: Pakistan Sports Complex; Level: International Series; Prize: $10,000; Format: 32MS/32WS/16MD/16WD/16XD	Score: 26–24, 21–14	
4 November	Pakistan International: Host: Islamabad, Pakistan; Venue: Pakistan Sports Complex; Level: International Series; Prize: $10,000; Format: 32MS/32WS/16MD/16WD/16XD	(Maldives) Aminath Nabeeha Abdul Razzaq (Maldives) Fathimath Nabaaha Abdul Razzaq	(Pakistan) Bushra Qayyum (Pakistan) Mahoor Shahzad
4 November	Pakistan International: Host: Islamabad, Pakistan; Venue: Pakistan Sports Complex; Level: International Series; Prize: $10,000; Format: 32MS/32WS/16MD/16WD/16XD	Score: 21–17, 21–13	
4 November	Pakistan International: Host: Islamabad, Pakistan; Venue: Pakistan Sports Complex; Level: International Series; Prize: $10,000; Format: 32MS/32WS/16MD/16WD/16XD	(Maldives) Hussein Zayan Shaheed (Maldives) Fathimath Nabaaha Abdul Razzaq	(Nepal) Dipesh Dhami (Nepal) Amita Giri
4 November	Pakistan International: Host: Islamabad, Pakistan; Venue: Pakistan Sports Complex; Level: International Series; Prize: $10,000; Format: 32MS/32WS/16MD/16WD/16XD	Score: 21–16, 21–19	
4 November	Kazakhstan International: Host: Oral, Kazakhstan; Venue: Sport Hall of TH "Nafta"; Level: International Series; Prize: $10,000; Format: 64MS/32WS/16MD/16WD/32XD	(Denmark) Ditlev Jæger Holm	(Russia) Sergey Sirant
4 November	Kazakhstan International: Host: Oral, Kazakhstan; Venue: Sport Hall of TH "Nafta"; Level: International Series; Prize: $10,000; Format: 64MS/32WS/16MD/16WD/32XD	Score: 21–13, 21–17	
4 November	Kazakhstan International: Host: Oral, Kazakhstan; Venue: Sport Hall of TH "Nafta"; Level: International Series; Prize: $10,000; Format: 64MS/32WS/16MD/16WD/32XD	(Russia) Natalia Perminova	(Moldova) Vlada Ginga
4 November	Kazakhstan International: Host: Oral, Kazakhstan; Venue: Sport Hall of TH "Nafta"; Level: International Series; Prize: $10,000; Format: 64MS/32WS/16MD/16WD/32XD	Score: 21–10, 21–8	
4 November	Kazakhstan International: Host: Oral, Kazakhstan; Venue: Sport Hall of TH "Nafta"; Level: International Series; Prize: $10,000; Format: 64MS/32WS/16MD/16WD/32XD	(Denmark) Jeppe Bruun (Denmark) Ditlev Jæger Holm	(Russia) Amir Khamidulin (Russia) Aleksandr Vasilkin
4 November	Kazakhstan International: Host: Oral, Kazakhstan; Venue: Sport Hall of TH "Nafta"; Level: International Series; Prize: $10,000; Format: 64MS/32WS/16MD/16WD/32XD	Score: 21–12, 21–11	
4 November	Kazakhstan International: Host: Oral, Kazakhstan; Venue: Sport Hall of TH "Nafta"; Level: International Series; Prize: $10,000; Format: 64MS/32WS/16MD/16WD/32XD	(Russia) Viktoriia Kozyreva (Russia) Mariia Sukhova	(Russia) Daria Dzhedzhula (Russia) Alexandra Semenova
4 November	Kazakhstan International: Host: Oral, Kazakhstan; Venue: Sport Hall of TH "Nafta"; Level: International Series; Prize: $10,000; Format: 64MS/32WS/16MD/16WD/32XD	Score: 21–14, 18–21, 21–19	
4 November	Kazakhstan International: Host: Oral, Kazakhstan; Venue: Sport Hall of TH "Nafta"; Level: International Series; Prize: $10,000; Format: 64MS/32WS/16MD/16WD/32XD	(Denmark) Jeppe Bruun (Denmark) Irina Amalie Andersen	(Kazakhstan) Artur Niyazov (Russia) Olga Ivashchenko
4 November	Kazakhstan International: Host: Oral, Kazakhstan; Venue: Sport Hall of TH "Nafta"; Level: International Series; Prize: $10,000; Format: 64MS/32WS/16MD/16WD/32XD	Score: 21–17, 21–13	
4 November	Norwegian International: Host: Sandefjord, Norway; Venue: Jotunhallen; Level: International Series; Prize: $10,000; Format: 32MS/32WS/32MD/32WD/32XD	(Chinese Taipei) Lin Yu-hsien	(Chinese Taipei) Chen Chi-ting
4 November	Norwegian International: Host: Sandefjord, Norway; Venue: Jotunhallen; Level: International Series; Prize: $10,000; Format: 32MS/32WS/32MD/32WD/32XD	Score: 21–14, 21–13	
4 November	Norwegian International: Host: Sandefjord, Norway; Venue: Jotunhallen; Level: International Series; Prize: $10,000; Format: 32MS/32WS/32MD/32WD/32XD	(Chinese Taipei) Sung Shuo-yun	(Vietnam) Nguyễn Thùy Linh
4 November	Norwegian International: Host: Sandefjord, Norway; Venue: Jotunhallen; Level: International Series; Prize: $10,000; Format: 32MS/32WS/32MD/32WD/32XD	Score: 21–16, 21–18	
4 November	Norwegian International: Host: Sandefjord, Norway; Venue: Jotunhallen; Level: International Series; Prize: $10,000; Format: 32MS/32WS/32MD/32WD/32XD	(Chinese Taipei) Lee Fang-chih (Chinese Taipei) Lee Fang-jen	(Denmark) Steve Olesen (Denmark) Andreas Søndergaard
4 November	Norwegian International: Host: Sandefjord, Norway; Venue: Jotunhallen; Level: International Series; Prize: $10,000; Format: 32MS/32WS/32MD/32WD/32XD	Score: 17–21, 21–16, 21–13	
4 November	Norwegian International: Host: Sandefjord, Norway; Venue: Jotunhallen; Level: International Series; Prize: $10,000; Format: 32MS/32WS/32MD/32WD/32XD	(Sweden) Emma Karlsson (Sweden) Johanna Magnusson	(Denmark) Natasja Anthonisen (Denmark) Clara Graversen
4 November	Norwegian International: Host: Sandefjord, Norway; Venue: Jotunhallen; Level: International Series; Prize: $10,000; Format: 32MS/32WS/32MD/32WD/32XD	Score: 20–22, 21–16, 21–10	
4 November	Norwegian International: Host: Sandefjord, Norway; Venue: Jotunhallen; Level: International Series; Prize: $10,000; Format: 32MS/32WS/32MD/32WD/32XD	(Denmark) Mads Emil Christensen (Sweden) Emma Karlsson	(France) William Villeger (France) Sharone Bauer
4 November	Norwegian International: Host: Sandefjord, Norway; Venue: Jotunhallen; Level: International Series; Prize: $10,000; Format: 32MS/32WS/32MD/32WD/32XD	Score: 21–19, 16–21, 21–12	
4 November	Guatemala Future Series: Host: Guatemala City, Guatemala; Venue: Gimnasio Teodoro Palacios Flores; Level: Future Series; Format: 32MS/16WS/16MD/8WD/16XD	(Mexico) Job Castillo	(Guatemala) Rubén Castellanos
4 November	Guatemala Future Series: Host: Guatemala City, Guatemala; Venue: Gimnasio Teodoro Palacios Flores; Level: Future Series; Format: 32MS/16WS/16MD/8WD/16XD	Score: 21–18, 21–15	
4 November	Guatemala Future Series: Host: Guatemala City, Guatemala; Venue: Gimnasio Teodoro Palacios Flores; Level: Future Series; Format: 32MS/16WS/16MD/8WD/16XD	(Guatemala) Diana Corleto	(Guatemala) Ana Lucía Albanés
4 November	Guatemala Future Series: Host: Guatemala City, Guatemala; Venue: Gimnasio Teodoro Palacios Flores; Level: Future Series; Format: 32MS/16WS/16MD/8WD/16XD	Score: 21–13, 21–12	
4 November	Guatemala Future Series: Host: Guatemala City, Guatemala; Venue: Gimnasio Teodoro Palacios Flores; Level: Future Series; Format: 32MS/16WS/16MD/8WD/16XD	(Guatemala) Jonathan Solís (Guatemala) Aníbal Marroquín	(Guatemala) Brandon Alavardo (Guatemala) Christopher Martínez
4 November	Guatemala Future Series: Host: Guatemala City, Guatemala; Venue: Gimnasio Teodoro Palacios Flores; Level: Future Series; Format: 32MS/16WS/16MD/8WD/16XD	Score: 21–16, 21–16	
4 November	Guatemala Future Series: Host: Guatemala City, Guatemala; Venue: Gimnasio Teodoro Palacios Flores; Level: Future Series; Format: 32MS/16WS/16MD/8WD/16XD	(Guatemala) Ana Lucía Albanés (Guatemala) Michele Barrios	(Guatemala) Mariana Palacios (Guatemala) Luisa Santizo
4 November	Guatemala Future Series: Host: Guatemala City, Guatemala; Venue: Gimnasio Teodoro Palacios Flores; Level: Future Series; Format: 32MS/16WS/16MD/8WD/16XD	Score: 21–9, 21–13	
4 November	Guatemala Future Series: Host: Guatemala City, Guatemala; Venue: Gimnasio Teodoro Palacios Flores; Level: Future Series; Format: 32MS/16WS/16MD/8WD/16XD	(Guatemala) Brandon Alavardo (Guatemala) Alejandra Paiz	(Guatemala) Yeison del Cid (Guatemala) Ana Lucía Albanés
4 November	Guatemala Future Series: Host: Guatemala City, Guatemala; Venue: Gimnasio Teodoro Palacios Flores; Level: Future Series; Format: 32MS/16WS/16MD/8WD/16XD	Score: 27–25, 21–18	
11 November	Hong Kong Open (Draw): Host: Hong Kong; Venue: Hong Kong Coliseum; Level: Super 500; Prize: $400,000; Format: 32MS/32WS/32MD/32WD/32XD	(Hong Kong) Lee Cheuk Yiu	(Indonesia) Anthony Sinisuka Ginting
11 November	Hong Kong Open (Draw): Host: Hong Kong; Venue: Hong Kong Coliseum; Level: Super 500; Prize: $400,000; Format: 32MS/32WS/32MD/32WD/32XD	Score: 16–21, 21–10, 22–20	
11 November	Hong Kong Open (Draw): Host: Hong Kong; Venue: Hong Kong Coliseum; Level: Super 500; Prize: $400,000; Format: 32MS/32WS/32MD/32WD/32XD	(China) Chen Yufei	(Thailand) Ratchanok Intanon
11 November	Hong Kong Open (Draw): Host: Hong Kong; Venue: Hong Kong Coliseum; Level: Super 500; Prize: $400,000; Format: 32MS/32WS/32MD/32WD/32XD	Score: 21–18, 13–21, 21–13	
11 November	Hong Kong Open (Draw): Host: Hong Kong; Venue: Hong Kong Coliseum; Level: Super 500; Prize: $400,000; Format: 32MS/32WS/32MD/32WD/32XD	(South Korea) Choi Sol-gyu (South Korea) Seo Seung-jae	(Indonesia) Mohammad Ahsan (Indonesia) Hendra Setiawan
11 November	Hong Kong Open (Draw): Host: Hong Kong; Venue: Hong Kong Coliseum; Level: Super 500; Prize: $400,000; Format: 32MS/32WS/32MD/32WD/32XD	Score: 13–21, 21–12, 21–13	
11 November	Hong Kong Open (Draw): Host: Hong Kong; Venue: Hong Kong Coliseum; Level: Super 500; Prize: $400,000; Format: 32MS/32WS/32MD/32WD/32XD	(China) Chen Qingchen (China) Jia Yifan	(South Korea) Chang Ye-na (South Korea) Kim Hye-rin
11 November	Hong Kong Open (Draw): Host: Hong Kong; Venue: Hong Kong Coliseum; Level: Super 500; Prize: $400,000; Format: 32MS/32WS/32MD/32WD/32XD	Score: 21–11, 13–21, 21–15	
11 November	Hong Kong Open (Draw): Host: Hong Kong; Venue: Hong Kong Coliseum; Level: Super 500; Prize: $400,000; Format: 32MS/32WS/32MD/32WD/32XD	(Japan) Yuta Watanabe (Japan) Arisa Higashino	(China) He Jiting (China) Du Yue
11 November	Hong Kong Open (Draw): Host: Hong Kong; Venue: Hong Kong Coliseum; Level: Super 500; Prize: $400,000; Format: 32MS/32WS/32MD/32WD/32XD	Score: 22–20, 21–16	
11 November	Malaysia International: Host: Kangar, Perlis, Malaysia; Venue: DEWAN 2020; Level: International Challenge; Prize: $25,000; Format: 64MS/32WS/32MD/32WD/32XD	(Malaysia) Cheam June Wei	(China) Ren Pengbo
11 November	Malaysia International: Host: Kangar, Perlis, Malaysia; Venue: DEWAN 2020; Level: International Challenge; Prize: $25,000; Format: 64MS/32WS/32MD/32WD/32XD	Score: 21–16, 19–21, 21–18	
11 November	Malaysia International: Host: Kangar, Perlis, Malaysia; Venue: DEWAN 2020; Level: International Challenge; Prize: $25,000; Format: 64MS/32WS/32MD/32WD/32XD	(China) Wang Zhiyi	(Japan) Asuka Takahashi
11 November	Malaysia International: Host: Kangar, Perlis, Malaysia; Venue: DEWAN 2020; Level: International Challenge; Prize: $25,000; Format: 64MS/32WS/32MD/32WD/32XD	Score: 12–21, 21–17, 21–16	
11 November	Malaysia International: Host: Kangar, Perlis, Malaysia; Venue: DEWAN 2020; Level: International Challenge; Prize: $25,000; Format: 64MS/32WS/32MD/32WD/32XD	(Japan) Hiroki Midorikawa (Japan) Kyohei Yamashita	(China) Liang Weikeng (China) Shang Yichen
11 November	Malaysia International: Host: Kangar, Perlis, Malaysia; Venue: DEWAN 2020; Level: International Challenge; Prize: $25,000; Format: 64MS/32WS/32MD/32WD/32XD	Score: 18–21, 21–10, 21–16	
11 November	Malaysia International: Host: Kangar, Perlis, Malaysia; Venue: DEWAN 2020; Level: International Challenge; Prize: $25,000; Format: 64MS/32WS/32MD/32WD/32XD	(Japan) Natsu Saito (Japan) Naru Shinoya	(Indonesia) Yulfira Barkah (Indonesia) Agatha Imanuela
11 November	Malaysia International: Host: Kangar, Perlis, Malaysia; Venue: DEWAN 2020; Level: International Challenge; Prize: $25,000; Format: 64MS/32WS/32MD/32WD/32XD	Score: 21–15, 21–23, 21–9	
11 November	Malaysia International: Host: Kangar, Perlis, Malaysia; Venue: DEWAN 2020; Level: International Challenge; Prize: $25,000; Format: 64MS/32WS/32MD/32WD/32XD	(China) Dong Weijie (China) Chen Xiaofei	(Malaysia) Man Wei Chong (Malaysia) Pearly Tan
11 November	Malaysia International: Host: Kangar, Perlis, Malaysia; Venue: DEWAN 2020; Level: International Challenge; Prize: $25,000; Format: 64MS/32WS/32MD/32WD/32XD	Score: 21–16, 21–19	
11 November	Nepal International: Host: Kathmandu, Nepal; Venue: Dashrath Stadium Covered Hall; Level: International Challenge; Prize: $25,000; Format: 64MS/32WS/32MD/16WD/32XD	(Vietnam) Phạm Cao Cường	(Thailand) Adulrach Namkul
11 November	Nepal International: Host: Kathmandu, Nepal; Venue: Dashrath Stadium Covered Hall; Level: International Challenge; Prize: $25,000; Format: 64MS/32WS/32MD/16WD/32XD	Score: 24–22, 9–21, 21–19	
11 November	Nepal International: Host: Kathmandu, Nepal; Venue: Dashrath Stadium Covered Hall; Level: International Challenge; Prize: $25,000; Format: 64MS/32WS/32MD/16WD/32XD	(Thailand) Porntip Buranaprasertsuk	(South Korea) Park Ga-eun
11 November	Nepal International: Host: Kathmandu, Nepal; Venue: Dashrath Stadium Covered Hall; Level: International Challenge; Prize: $25,000; Format: 64MS/32WS/32MD/16WD/32XD	Score: 21–16, 21–14	
11 November	Nepal International: Host: Kathmandu, Nepal; Venue: Dashrath Stadium Covered Hall; Level: International Challenge; Prize: $25,000; Format: 64MS/32WS/32MD/16WD/32XD	(India) Manu Attri (India) B. Sumeeth Reddy	(India) Arjun M. R. (India) Dhruv Kapila
11 November	Nepal International: Host: Kathmandu, Nepal; Venue: Dashrath Stadium Covered Hall; Level: International Challenge; Prize: $25,000; Format: 64MS/32WS/32MD/16WD/32XD	Score: 21–19, 21–15	
11 November	Nepal International: Host: Kathmandu, Nepal; Venue: Dashrath Stadium Covered Hall; Level: International Challenge; Prize: $25,000; Format: 64MS/32WS/32MD/16WD/32XD	(Australia) Setyana Mapasa (Australia) Gronya Somerville	(India) K. Maneesha (India) Rutaparna Panda
11 November	Nepal International: Host: Kathmandu, Nepal; Venue: Dashrath Stadium Covered Hall; Level: International Challenge; Prize: $25,000; Format: 64MS/32WS/32MD/16WD/32XD	Score: 21–10, 18–21, 21–11	
11 November	Nepal International: Host: Kathmandu, Nepal; Venue: Dashrath Stadium Covered Hall; Level: International Challenge; Prize: $25,000; Format: 64MS/32WS/32MD/16WD/32XD	(Thailand) Supak Jomkoh (Thailand) Supissara Paewsampran	(South Korea) Kim Sa-rang (South Korea) Kim Ha-na
11 November	Nepal International: Host: Kathmandu, Nepal; Venue: Dashrath Stadium Covered Hall; Level: International Challenge; Prize: $25,000; Format: 64MS/32WS/32MD/16WD/32XD	Score: 21–18, 21–16	
11 November	Irish Open: Host: Dublin, Republic of Ireland; Venue: National Indoor Arena; Level: International Challenge; Prize: $25,000; Format: 32MS/32WS/32MD/32WD/32XD	(France) Toma Junior Popov	(Spain) Pablo Abián
11 November	Irish Open: Host: Dublin, Republic of Ireland; Venue: National Indoor Arena; Level: International Challenge; Prize: $25,000; Format: 32MS/32WS/32MD/32WD/32XD	Score: 21–10, 24–22	
11 November	Irish Open: Host: Dublin, Republic of Ireland; Venue: National Indoor Arena; Level: International Challenge; Prize: $25,000; Format: 32MS/32WS/32MD/32WD/32XD	(France) Qi Xuefei	(Denmark) Julie Dawall Jakobsen
11 November	Irish Open: Host: Dublin, Republic of Ireland; Venue: National Indoor Arena; Level: International Challenge; Prize: $25,000; Format: 32MS/32WS/32MD/32WD/32XD	Score: 21–15, 21–12	
11 November	Irish Open: Host: Dublin, Republic of Ireland; Venue: National Indoor Arena; Level: International Challenge; Prize: $25,000; Format: 32MS/32WS/32MD/32WD/32XD	(Germany) Jones Ralfy Jansen (Germany) Peter Käsbauer	(Scotland) Alexander Dunn (Scotland) Adam Hall
11 November	Irish Open: Host: Dublin, Republic of Ireland; Venue: National Indoor Arena; Level: International Challenge; Prize: $25,000; Format: 32MS/32WS/32MD/32WD/32XD	Score: 21–19, 17–21, 21–18	
11 November	Irish Open: Host: Dublin, Republic of Ireland; Venue: National Indoor Arena; Level: International Challenge; Prize: $25,000; Format: 32MS/32WS/32MD/32WD/32XD	(Denmark) Amalie Magelund (Denmark) Freja Ravn	(France) Delphine Delrue (France) Léa Palermo
11 November	Irish Open: Host: Dublin, Republic of Ireland; Venue: National Indoor Arena; Level: International Challenge; Prize: $25,000; Format: 32MS/32WS/32MD/32WD/32XD	Score: 21–18, 21–11	
11 November	Irish Open: Host: Dublin, Republic of Ireland; Venue: National Indoor Arena; Level: International Challenge; Prize: $25,000; Format: 32MS/32WS/32MD/32WD/32XD	(Denmark) Mathias Christiansen (Denmark) Alexandra Bøje	(France) Ronan Labar (France) Anne Tran
11 November	Irish Open: Host: Dublin, Republic of Ireland; Venue: National Indoor Arena; Level: International Challenge; Prize: $25,000; Format: 32MS/32WS/32MD/32WD/32XD	Score: 21–12, 21–19	
11 November	Suriname International: Host: Paramaribo, Suriname; Venue: Ring Sport Center; Level: International Series; Prize: $10,000; Format: 32MS/16WS/8MD/8WD/16XD	(Canada) Brian Yang	(Guatemala) Kevin Cordón
11 November	Suriname International: Host: Paramaribo, Suriname; Venue: Ring Sport Center; Level: International Series; Prize: $10,000; Format: 32MS/16WS/8MD/8WD/16XD	Score: Walkover	
11 November	Suriname International: Host: Paramaribo, Suriname; Venue: Ring Sport Center; Level: International Series; Prize: $10,000; Format: 32MS/16WS/8MD/8WD/16XD	(Mexico) Haramara Gaitán	(Czech Republic) Tereza Švábíková
11 November	Suriname International: Host: Paramaribo, Suriname; Venue: Ring Sport Center; Level: International Series; Prize: $10,000; Format: 32MS/16WS/8MD/8WD/16XD	Score: 16–21, 21–10, 23–21	
11 November	Suriname International: Host: Paramaribo, Suriname; Venue: Ring Sport Center; Level: International Series; Prize: $10,000; Format: 32MS/16WS/8MD/8WD/16XD	(Suriname) Danny Chen (Suriname) Mitchel Wongsodikromo	(Barbados) Shae Michael Martin (Barbados) Gavin Robinson
11 November	Suriname International: Host: Paramaribo, Suriname; Venue: Ring Sport Center; Level: International Series; Prize: $10,000; Format: 32MS/16WS/8MD/8WD/16XD	Score: 21–18, 21–15	
11 November	Suriname International: Host: Paramaribo, Suriname; Venue: Ring Sport Center; Level: International Series; Prize: $10,000; Format: 32MS/16WS/8MD/8WD/16XD	(Peru) Daniela Macías (Peru) Dánica Nishimura	(Barbados) Monyata Riviera (Barbados) Sabrina Scott
11 November	Suriname International: Host: Paramaribo, Suriname; Venue: Ring Sport Center; Level: International Series; Prize: $10,000; Format: 32MS/16WS/8MD/8WD/16XD	Score: 21–4, 21–7	
11 November	Suriname International: Host: Paramaribo, Suriname; Venue: Ring Sport Center; Level: International Series; Prize: $10,000; Format: 32MS/16WS/8MD/8WD/16XD	(Barbados) Shae Michael Martin (Barbados) Sabrina Scott	(Barbados) Gavin Robinson (Barbados) Monyata Riviera
11 November	Suriname International: Host: Paramaribo, Suriname; Venue: Ring Sport Center; Level: International Series; Prize: $10,000; Format: 32MS/16WS/8MD/8WD/16XD	Score: 21–15, 21–16	
11 November	Cameroon International: Host: Yaoundé, Cameroon; Venue: Palais polyvalent des sports de Yaoundé; Level: International Series; Prize: $10,000; Format: 32MS/32WS/16MD/8WD/16XD	(Azerbaijan) Ade Resky Dwicahyo	(Austria) Luka Wraber
11 November	Cameroon International: Host: Yaoundé, Cameroon; Venue: Palais polyvalent des sports de Yaoundé; Level: International Series; Prize: $10,000; Format: 32MS/32WS/16MD/8WD/16XD	Score: 22–20, 19–21, 21–16	
11 November	Cameroon International: Host: Yaoundé, Cameroon; Venue: Palais polyvalent des sports de Yaoundé; Level: International Series; Prize: $10,000; Format: 32MS/32WS/16MD/8WD/16XD	(Iran) Sorayya Aghaei	(Nigeria) Dorcas Ajoke Adesokan
11 November	Cameroon International: Host: Yaoundé, Cameroon; Venue: Palais polyvalent des sports de Yaoundé; Level: International Series; Prize: $10,000; Format: 32MS/32WS/16MD/8WD/16XD	Score: 21–19, 21–12	
11 November	Cameroon International: Host: Yaoundé, Cameroon; Venue: Palais polyvalent des sports de Yaoundé; Level: International Series; Prize: $10,000; Format: 32MS/32WS/16MD/8WD/16XD	(Nigeria) Godwin Olofua (Nigeria) Anuoluwapo Juwon Opeyori	(Egypt) Adham Hatem Elgamal (Egypt) Ahmed Salah
11 November	Cameroon International: Host: Yaoundé, Cameroon; Venue: Palais polyvalent des sports de Yaoundé; Level: International Series; Prize: $10,000; Format: 32MS/32WS/16MD/8WD/16XD	Score: 21–12, 11–21, 21–11	
11 November	Cameroon International: Host: Yaoundé, Cameroon; Venue: Palais polyvalent des sports de Yaoundé; Level: International Series; Prize: $10,000; Format: 32MS/32WS/16MD/8WD/16XD	(Egypt) Doha Hany (Egypt) Hadia Hosny	(Cameroon) Madeleine Carene Leticia Akoumba Ze (Cameroon) Laeticia Guefack Ghomsi
11 November	Cameroon International: Host: Yaoundé, Cameroon; Venue: Palais polyvalent des sports de Yaoundé; Level: International Series; Prize: $10,000; Format: 32MS/32WS/16MD/8WD/16XD	Score: 21–6, 21–3	
11 November	Cameroon International: Host: Yaoundé, Cameroon; Venue: Palais polyvalent des sports de Yaoundé; Level: International Series; Prize: $10,000; Format: 32MS/32WS/16MD/8WD/16XD	(Egypt) Adham Hatem Elgamal (Egypt) Doha Hany	(Egypt) Ahmed Salah (Egypt) Hadia Hosny
11 November	Cameroon International: Host: Yaoundé, Cameroon; Venue: Palais polyvalent des sports de Yaoundé; Level: International Series; Prize: $10,000; Format: 32MS/32WS/16MD/8WD/16XD	Score: Walkover	
18 November	Korea Masters (Draw): Host: Gwangju, South Korea; Venue: Gwangju Women's University Stadium; Level: Super 300; Prize: $250,000; Format: 32MS/32WS/32MD/32WD/32XD	(Japan) Kanta Tsuneyama	(China) Lin Dan
18 November	Korea Masters (Draw): Host: Gwangju, South Korea; Venue: Gwangju Women's University Stadium; Level: Super 300; Prize: $250,000; Format: 32MS/32WS/32MD/32WD/32XD	Score: 24–22, 21–12	
18 November	Korea Masters (Draw): Host: Gwangju, South Korea; Venue: Gwangju Women's University Stadium; Level: Super 300; Prize: $250,000; Format: 32MS/32WS/32MD/32WD/32XD	(South Korea) An Se-young	(South Korea) Sung Ji-hyun
18 November	Korea Masters (Draw): Host: Gwangju, South Korea; Venue: Gwangju Women's University Stadium; Level: Super 300; Prize: $250,000; Format: 32MS/32WS/32MD/32WD/32XD	Score: 21–13, 21–17	
18 November	Korea Masters (Draw): Host: Gwangju, South Korea; Venue: Gwangju Women's University Stadium; Level: Super 300; Prize: $250,000; Format: 32MS/32WS/32MD/32WD/32XD	(Chinese Taipei) Lee Yang (Chinese Taipei) Wang Chi-lin	(Malaysia) Goh V Shem (Malaysia) Tan Wee Kiong
18 November	Korea Masters (Draw): Host: Gwangju, South Korea; Venue: Gwangju Women's University Stadium; Level: Super 300; Prize: $250,000; Format: 32MS/32WS/32MD/32WD/32XD	Score: 21–19, 20–22, 21–19	
18 November	Korea Masters (Draw): Host: Gwangju, South Korea; Venue: Gwangju Women's University Stadium; Level: Super 300; Prize: $250,000; Format: 32MS/32WS/32MD/32WD/32XD	(Japan) Nami Matsuyama (Japan) Chiharu Shida	(Japan) Misaki Matsutomo (Japan) Ayaka Takahashi
18 November	Korea Masters (Draw): Host: Gwangju, South Korea; Venue: Gwangju Women's University Stadium; Level: Super 300; Prize: $250,000; Format: 32MS/32WS/32MD/32WD/32XD	Score: 15–21, 21–17, 21–18	
18 November	Korea Masters (Draw): Host: Gwangju, South Korea; Venue: Gwangju Women's University Stadium; Level: Super 300; Prize: $250,000; Format: 32MS/32WS/32MD/32WD/32XD	(Hong Kong) Tang Chun Man (Hong Kong) Tse Ying Suet	(Malaysia) Goh Soon Huat (Malaysia) Shevon Jemie Lai
18 November	Korea Masters (Draw): Host: Gwangju, South Korea; Venue: Gwangju Women's University Stadium; Level: Super 300; Prize: $250,000; Format: 32MS/32WS/32MD/32WD/32XD	Score: 21–14, 21–15	
18 November	India International: Host: Mumbai, India; Venue: Cricket Club of India; Level: International Challenge; Prize: $25,000; Format: 32MS/32WS/16MD/16WD/16XD	(Canada) Xiaodong Sheng	(India) Kaushal Dharmamer
18 November	India International: Host: Mumbai, India; Venue: Cricket Club of India; Level: International Challenge; Prize: $25,000; Format: 32MS/32WS/16MD/16WD/16XD	Score: 21–19, 8–21, 21–14	
18 November	India International: Host: Mumbai, India; Venue: Cricket Club of India; Level: International Challenge; Prize: $25,000; Format: 32MS/32WS/16MD/16WD/16XD	(Thailand) Porntip Buranaprasertsuk	(Thailand) Benyapa Aimsaard
18 November	India International: Host: Mumbai, India; Venue: Cricket Club of India; Level: International Challenge; Prize: $25,000; Format: 32MS/32WS/16MD/16WD/16XD	Score: 21–18, 21–11	
18 November	India International: Host: Mumbai, India; Venue: Cricket Club of India; Level: International Challenge; Prize: $25,000; Format: 32MS/32WS/16MD/16WD/16XD	(India) Manu Attri (India) B. Sumeeth Reddy	(Thailand) Chaloempon Charoenkitamorn (Thailand) Kittisak Namdash
18 November	India International: Host: Mumbai, India; Venue: Cricket Club of India; Level: International Challenge; Prize: $25,000; Format: 32MS/32WS/16MD/16WD/16XD	Score: 21–15, 21–15	
18 November	India International: Host: Mumbai, India; Venue: Cricket Club of India; Level: International Challenge; Prize: $25,000; Format: 32MS/32WS/16MD/16WD/16XD	(Malaysia) Pearly Tan (Malaysia) Thinaah Muralitharan	(Malaysia) Teoh Mei Xing (Malaysia) Yap Ling
18 November	India International: Host: Mumbai, India; Venue: Cricket Club of India; Level: International Challenge; Prize: $25,000; Format: 32MS/32WS/16MD/16WD/16XD	Score: 21–18, 21–14	
18 November	India International: Host: Mumbai, India; Venue: Cricket Club of India; Level: International Challenge; Prize: $25,000; Format: 32MS/32WS/16MD/16WD/16XD	(Malaysia) Hoo Pang Ron (Malaysia) Cheah Yee See	(Malaysia) Chia Wei Jie (Malaysia) Pearly Tan Koong Le
18 November	India International: Host: Mumbai, India; Venue: Cricket Club of India; Level: International Challenge; Prize: $25,000; Format: 32MS/32WS/16MD/16WD/16XD	Score: 21–15, 21–15	
18 November	Scottish Open: Host: Glasgow, Scotland; Venue: Emirates Arena; Level: International Challenge; Prize: $25,000; Format: 32MS/32WS/32MD/32WD/32XD	(India) Lakshya Sen	(Brazil) Ygor Coelho
18 November	Scottish Open: Host: Glasgow, Scotland; Venue: Emirates Arena; Level: International Challenge; Prize: $25,000; Format: 32MS/32WS/32MD/32WD/32XD	Score: 18–21, 21–18, 21–19	
18 November	Scottish Open: Host: Glasgow, Scotland; Venue: Emirates Arena; Level: International Challenge; Prize: $25,000; Format: 32MS/32WS/32MD/32WD/32XD	(France) Qi Xuefei	(Chinese Taipei) Sung Shuo-yun
18 November	Scottish Open: Host: Glasgow, Scotland; Venue: Emirates Arena; Level: International Challenge; Prize: $25,000; Format: 32MS/32WS/32MD/32WD/32XD	Score: 17–21, 22–20, 21–12	
18 November	Scottish Open: Host: Glasgow, Scotland; Venue: Emirates Arena; Level: International Challenge; Prize: $25,000; Format: 32MS/32WS/32MD/32WD/32XD	(Scotland) Alexander Dunn (Scotland) Adam Hall	(Denmark) Jeppe Bay (Denmark) Mikkel Mikkelsen
18 November	Scottish Open: Host: Glasgow, Scotland; Venue: Emirates Arena; Level: International Challenge; Prize: $25,000; Format: 32MS/32WS/32MD/32WD/32XD	Score: 21–10, 21–17	
18 November	Scottish Open: Host: Glasgow, Scotland; Venue: Emirates Arena; Level: International Challenge; Prize: $25,000; Format: 32MS/32WS/32MD/32WD/32XD	(Denmark) Amalie Magelund (Denmark) Freja Ravn	(Denmark) Julie Finne-Ipsen (Denmark) Mai Surrow
18 November	Scottish Open: Host: Glasgow, Scotland; Venue: Emirates Arena; Level: International Challenge; Prize: $25,000; Format: 32MS/32WS/32MD/32WD/32XD	Score: 17–21, 21–15, 21–6	
18 November	Scottish Open: Host: Glasgow, Scotland; Venue: Emirates Arena; Level: International Challenge; Prize: $25,000; Format: 32MS/32WS/32MD/32WD/32XD	(Denmark) Mathias Christiansen (Denmark) Alexandra Bøje	(Denmark) Mathias Bay-Smidt (Denmark) Rikke Søby Hansen
18 November	Scottish Open: Host: Glasgow, Scotland; Venue: Emirates Arena; Level: International Challenge; Prize: $25,000; Format: 32MS/32WS/32MD/32WD/32XD	Score: 23–21, 21–16	
18 November	Slovenian International: Host: Brežice, Slovenia; Venue: Sporthall Brežice; Level: Future Series; Format: 32MS/32WS/32MD/32WD/32XD	(Denmark) Karan Rajan Rajarajan	(Czech Republic) Jan Louda
18 November	Slovenian International: Host: Brežice, Slovenia; Venue: Sporthall Brežice; Level: Future Series; Format: 32MS/32WS/32MD/32WD/32XD	Score: 21–17, 11–21, 21–19	
18 November	Slovenian International: Host: Brežice, Slovenia; Venue: Sporthall Brežice; Level: Future Series; Format: 32MS/32WS/32MD/32WD/32XD	(Switzerland) Jenjira Stadelmann	(Hungary) Mónika Szőke
18 November	Slovenian International: Host: Brežice, Slovenia; Venue: Sporthall Brežice; Level: Future Series; Format: 32MS/32WS/32MD/32WD/32XD	Score: 21–18, 13–21, 21–15	
18 November	Slovenian International: Host: Brežice, Slovenia; Venue: Sporthall Brežice; Level: Future Series; Format: 32MS/32WS/32MD/32WD/32XD	(Czech Republic) Jaromír Janáček (Czech Republic) Tomáš Švejda	(Denmark) Kristoffer Knudsen (Denmark) Mouritz Troels Munk
18 November	Slovenian International: Host: Brežice, Slovenia; Venue: Sporthall Brežice; Level: Future Series; Format: 32MS/32WS/32MD/32WD/32XD	Score: 21–18, 17–21, 21–11	
18 November	Slovenian International: Host: Brežice, Slovenia; Venue: Sporthall Brežice; Level: Future Series; Format: 32MS/32WS/32MD/32WD/32XD	(Denmark) Frederikke Lund (Denmark) Signe Schulz	(Denmark) Amalie Cecilie Kudsk (Denmark) Elisa Melgaard
18 November	Slovenian International: Host: Brežice, Slovenia; Venue: Sporthall Brežice; Level: Future Series; Format: 32MS/32WS/32MD/32WD/32XD	Score: 21–15, 21–11	
18 November	Slovenian International: Host: Brežice, Slovenia; Venue: Sporthall Brežice; Level: Future Series; Format: 32MS/32WS/32MD/32WD/32XD	(Slovenia) Miha Ivančič (Slovenia) Petra Polanc	(Denmark) Kristoffer Knudsen (Denmark) Elisa Melgaard
18 November	Slovenian International: Host: Brežice, Slovenia; Venue: Sporthall Brežice; Level: Future Series; Format: 32MS/32WS/32MD/32WD/32XD	Score: 21–12, 21–14	
18 November	Botswana International: Host: Lobatse, Botswana; Venue: Lobatse Sports Complex; Level: Future Series; Format: 32MS/16WS/8MD/8WD/16XD	(South Africa) Cameron Coetzer	(South Africa) Robert Summers
18 November	Botswana International: Host: Lobatse, Botswana; Venue: Lobatse Sports Complex; Level: Future Series; Format: 32MS/16WS/8MD/8WD/16XD	Score: 22–20, 15–21, 21–14	
18 November	Botswana International: Host: Lobatse, Botswana; Venue: Lobatse Sports Complex; Level: Future Series; Format: 32MS/16WS/8MD/8WD/16XD	(South Africa) Johanita Scholtz	(South Africa) Megan de Beer
18 November	Botswana International: Host: Lobatse, Botswana; Venue: Lobatse Sports Complex; Level: Future Series; Format: 32MS/16WS/8MD/8WD/16XD	Score: 21–11, 21–8	
18 November	Botswana International: Host: Lobatse, Botswana; Venue: Lobatse Sports Complex; Level: Future Series; Format: 32MS/16WS/8MD/8WD/16XD	(South Africa) Jason Mann (South Africa) Bongani von Bodenstein	(South Africa) Cameron Coetzer (South Africa) Jarred Elliott
18 November	Botswana International: Host: Lobatse, Botswana; Venue: Lobatse Sports Complex; Level: Future Series; Format: 32MS/16WS/8MD/8WD/16XD	Score: 21–18, 21–19	
18 November	Botswana International: Host: Lobatse, Botswana; Venue: Lobatse Sports Complex; Level: Future Series; Format: 32MS/16WS/8MD/8WD/16XD	(South Africa) Megan de Beer (South Africa) Johanita Scholtz	(South Africa) Michelle Butler-Emmett (South Africa) Kerry-Lee Harrington
18 November	Botswana International: Host: Lobatse, Botswana; Venue: Lobatse Sports Complex; Level: Future Series; Format: 32MS/16WS/8MD/8WD/16XD	Score: 21–18, 22–20	
18 November	Botswana International: Host: Lobatse, Botswana; Venue: Lobatse Sports Complex; Level: Future Series; Format: 32MS/16WS/8MD/8WD/16XD	(South Africa) Jarred Elliott (South Africa) Megan de Beer	(South Africa) Jason Mann (South Africa) Johanita Scholtz
18 November	Botswana International: Host: Lobatse, Botswana; Venue: Lobatse Sports Complex; Level: Future Series; Format: 32MS/16WS/8MD/8WD/16XD	Score: 21–19, 21–14	
25 November	Syed Modi International (Draw): Host: Lucknow, India; Venue: Babu Banarasi Das Indoor Stadium; Level: Super 300; Prize: $150,000; Format: 32MS/32WS/32MD/32WD/32XD	(Chinese Taipei) Wang Tzu-wei	(India) Sourabh Verma
25 November	Syed Modi International (Draw): Host: Lucknow, India; Venue: Babu Banarasi Das Indoor Stadium; Level: Super 300; Prize: $150,000; Format: 32MS/32WS/32MD/32WD/32XD	Score: 21–15, 21–17	
25 November	Syed Modi International (Draw): Host: Lucknow, India; Venue: Babu Banarasi Das Indoor Stadium; Level: Super 300; Prize: $150,000; Format: 32MS/32WS/32MD/32WD/32XD	(Spain) Carolina Marín	(Thailand) Phittayaporn Chaiwan
25 November	Syed Modi International (Draw): Host: Lucknow, India; Venue: Babu Banarasi Das Indoor Stadium; Level: Super 300; Prize: $150,000; Format: 32MS/32WS/32MD/32WD/32XD	Score: 21–12, 21–16	
25 November	Syed Modi International (Draw): Host: Lucknow, India; Venue: Babu Banarasi Das Indoor Stadium; Level: Super 300; Prize: $150,000; Format: 32MS/32WS/32MD/32WD/32XD	(China) He Jiting (China) Tan Qiang	(South Korea) Choi Sol-gyu (South Korea) Seo Seung-jae
25 November	Syed Modi International (Draw): Host: Lucknow, India; Venue: Babu Banarasi Das Indoor Stadium; Level: Super 300; Prize: $150,000; Format: 32MS/32WS/32MD/32WD/32XD	Score: 21–18, 21–19	
25 November	Syed Modi International (Draw): Host: Lucknow, India; Venue: Babu Banarasi Das Indoor Stadium; Level: Super 300; Prize: $150,000; Format: 32MS/32WS/32MD/32WD/32XD	(South Korea) Baek Ha-na (South Korea) Jung Kyung-eun	(South Korea) Chang Ye-na (South Korea) Kim Hye-rin
25 November	Syed Modi International (Draw): Host: Lucknow, India; Venue: Babu Banarasi Das Indoor Stadium; Level: Super 300; Prize: $150,000; Format: 32MS/32WS/32MD/32WD/32XD	Score: 23–21, 21–15	
25 November	Syed Modi International (Draw): Host: Lucknow, India; Venue: Babu Banarasi Das Indoor Stadium; Level: Super 300; Prize: $150,000; Format: 32MS/32WS/32MD/32WD/32XD	(Russia) Rodion Alimov (Russia) Alina Davletova	(England) Marcus Ellis (England) Lauren Smith
25 November	Syed Modi International (Draw): Host: Lucknow, India; Venue: Babu Banarasi Das Indoor Stadium; Level: Super 300; Prize: $150,000; Format: 32MS/32WS/32MD/32WD/32XD	Score: 21–18, 21–16	
25 November	Welsh International: Host: Cardiff, Wales; Venue: Sport Wales National Centre; Level: International Series; Prize: $10,000; Format: 32MS/32WS/32MD/32WD/32XD	(Denmark) Ditlev Jæger Holm	(Malaysia) Yeoh Seng Zoe
25 November	Welsh International: Host: Cardiff, Wales; Venue: Sport Wales National Centre; Level: International Series; Prize: $10,000; Format: 32MS/32WS/32MD/32WD/32XD	Score: 21–13, 21–12	
25 November	Welsh International: Host: Cardiff, Wales; Venue: Sport Wales National Centre; Level: International Series; Prize: $10,000; Format: 32MS/32WS/32MD/32WD/32XD	(Spain) Clara Azurmendi	(Germany) Fabienne Deprez
25 November	Welsh International: Host: Cardiff, Wales; Venue: Sport Wales National Centre; Level: International Series; Prize: $10,000; Format: 32MS/32WS/32MD/32WD/32XD	Score: 21–14, 21–16	
25 November	Welsh International: Host: Cardiff, Wales; Venue: Sport Wales National Centre; Level: International Series; Prize: $10,000; Format: 32MS/32WS/32MD/32WD/32XD	(Chinese Taipei) Chiang Chien-wei (Chinese Taipei) Ye Hong-wei	(England) Zach Russ (England) Steven Stallwood
25 November	Welsh International: Host: Cardiff, Wales; Venue: Sport Wales National Centre; Level: International Series; Prize: $10,000; Format: 32MS/32WS/32MD/32WD/32XD	Score: 21–14, 21–14	
25 November	Welsh International: Host: Cardiff, Wales; Venue: Sport Wales National Centre; Level: International Series; Prize: $10,000; Format: 32MS/32WS/32MD/32WD/32XD	(England) Abigail Holden (England) Lizzie Tolman	(England) Freya Redfearn (England) Hope Warner
25 November	Welsh International: Host: Cardiff, Wales; Venue: Sport Wales National Centre; Level: International Series; Prize: $10,000; Format: 32MS/32WS/32MD/32WD/32XD	Score: 8–21, 21–15, 21–16	
25 November	Welsh International: Host: Cardiff, Wales; Venue: Sport Wales National Centre; Level: International Series; Prize: $10,000; Format: 32MS/32WS/32MD/32WD/32XD	(Scotland) Alexander Dunn (Scotland) Ciara Torrance	(England) Matthew Clare (England) Hope Warner
25 November	Welsh International: Host: Cardiff, Wales; Venue: Sport Wales National Centre; Level: International Series; Prize: $10,000; Format: 32MS/32WS/32MD/32WD/32XD	Score: 21–14, 20–22, 21–17	
25 November	Zambia International: Host: Lusaka, Zambia; Venue: Olympic Youth Development Centre; Level: Future Series; Format: 32MS/32WS/16MD/16WD/16XD	(United States) Timothy Lam	(Algeria) Youcef Sabri Medel
25 November	Zambia International: Host: Lusaka, Zambia; Venue: Olympic Youth Development Centre; Level: Future Series; Format: 32MS/32WS/16MD/16WD/16XD	Score: 21–13, 21–7	
25 November	Zambia International: Host: Lusaka, Zambia; Venue: Olympic Youth Development Centre; Level: Future Series; Format: 32MS/32WS/16MD/16WD/16XD	(Nigeria) Dorcas Ajoke Adesokan	(Egypt) Doha Hany
25 November	Zambia International: Host: Lusaka, Zambia; Venue: Olympic Youth Development Centre; Level: Future Series; Format: 32MS/32WS/16MD/16WD/16XD	Score: 20–22, 21–18, 21–18	
25 November	Zambia International: Host: Lusaka, Zambia; Venue: Olympic Youth Development Centre; Level: Future Series; Format: 32MS/32WS/16MD/16WD/16XD	(Egypt) Adham Hatem Elgamal (Egypt) Ahmed Salah	(Algeria) Koceila Mammeri (Algeria) Youcef Sabri Medel
25 November	Zambia International: Host: Lusaka, Zambia; Venue: Olympic Youth Development Centre; Level: Future Series; Format: 32MS/32WS/16MD/16WD/16XD	Score: 20–22, 21–19, 21–14	
25 November	Zambia International: Host: Lusaka, Zambia; Venue: Olympic Youth Development Centre; Level: Future Series; Format: 32MS/32WS/16MD/16WD/16XD	(Egypt) Doha Hany (Egypt) Hadia Hosny	(Egypt) Nour Ahmed Youssri (Egypt) Jana Ashraf
25 November	Zambia International: Host: Lusaka, Zambia; Venue: Olympic Youth Development Centre; Level: Future Series; Format: 32MS/32WS/16MD/16WD/16XD	Score: 21–9, 21–11	
25 November	Zambia International: Host: Lusaka, Zambia; Venue: Olympic Youth Development Centre; Level: Future Series; Format: 32MS/32WS/16MD/16WD/16XD	(Egypt) Adham Hatem Elgamal (Egypt) Doha Hany	(Egypt) Ahmed Salah (Egypt) Hadia Hosny
25 November	Zambia International: Host: Lusaka, Zambia; Venue: Olympic Youth Development Centre; Level: Future Series; Format: 32MS/32WS/16MD/16WD/16XD	Score: 21–17, 21–17	

=== December ===
Week commencing	Tournament	Champions	Runners-up
2 December	El Salvador International: Host: Nuevo Cuscatlán, El Salvador; Venue: Besport; Level: Future Series; Format: 32MS/32WS/32MD/16WD/32XD	(El Salvador) Uriel Canjura	(United States) Howard Shu
2 December	El Salvador International: Host: Nuevo Cuscatlán, El Salvador; Venue: Besport; Level: Future Series; Format: 32MS/32WS/32MD/16WD/32XD	Score: 21–11, 11–21, 21–13	
2 December	El Salvador International: Host: Nuevo Cuscatlán, El Salvador; Venue: Besport; Level: Future Series; Format: 32MS/32WS/32MD/16WD/32XD	(Peru) Daniela Macías	(Mexico) Haramara Gaitán
2 December	El Salvador International: Host: Nuevo Cuscatlán, El Salvador; Venue: Besport; Level: Future Series; Format: 32MS/32WS/32MD/16WD/32XD	Score: 21–16, 14–21, 21–14	
2 December	El Salvador International: Host: Nuevo Cuscatlán, El Salvador; Venue: Besport; Level: Future Series; Format: 32MS/32WS/32MD/16WD/32XD	(Guatemala) Jonathan Solís (Guatemala) Aníbal Marroquín	(Guatemala) Brandon Alvarado (Guatemala) Christopher Martínez
2 December	El Salvador International: Host: Nuevo Cuscatlán, El Salvador; Venue: Besport; Level: Future Series; Format: 32MS/32WS/32MD/16WD/32XD	Score: 23–21, 21–17	
2 December	El Salvador International: Host: Nuevo Cuscatlán, El Salvador; Venue: Besport; Level: Future Series; Format: 32MS/32WS/32MD/16WD/32XD	(Peru) Daniela Macías (Peru) Dánica Nishimura	(Guatemala) Ana Lucía Albanés (Guatemala) Michele Barrios
2 December	El Salvador International: Host: Nuevo Cuscatlán, El Salvador; Venue: Besport; Level: Future Series; Format: 32MS/32WS/32MD/16WD/32XD	Score: 21–14, 21–8	
2 December	El Salvador International: Host: Nuevo Cuscatlán, El Salvador; Venue: Besport; Level: Future Series; Format: 32MS/32WS/32MD/16WD/32XD	(Guatemala) Jonathan Solís (Guatemala) Diana Corleto	(Guatemala) José Luis Granados (Guatemala) Michele Barrios
2 December	El Salvador International: Host: Nuevo Cuscatlán, El Salvador; Venue: Besport; Level: Future Series; Format: 32MS/32WS/32MD/16WD/32XD	Score: 21–17, 21–15	
2 December	South Africa International: Host: Pretoria, South Africa; Venue: Tswane Show Grounds; Level: Future Series; Format: 64MS/32WS/16MD/16WD/32XD	(Austria) Luka Wraber	(Czech Republic) Milan Ludik
2 December	South Africa International: Host: Pretoria, South Africa; Venue: Tswane Show Grounds; Level: Future Series; Format: 64MS/32WS/16MD/16WD/32XD	Score: Walkover	
2 December	South Africa International: Host: Pretoria, South Africa; Venue: Tswane Show Grounds; Level: Future Series; Format: 64MS/32WS/16MD/16WD/32XD	(Mauritius) Kate Foo Kune	(Italy) Katharina Fink
2 December	South Africa International: Host: Pretoria, South Africa; Venue: Tswane Show Grounds; Level: Future Series; Format: 64MS/32WS/16MD/16WD/32XD	Score: 21–16, 21–14	
2 December	South Africa International: Host: Pretoria, South Africa; Venue: Tswane Show Grounds; Level: Future Series; Format: 64MS/32WS/16MD/16WD/32XD	(Algeria) Koceila Mammeri (Algeria) Youcef Sabri Medel	(Egypt) Adham Hatem Elgamal (Egypt) Ahmed Salah
2 December	South Africa International: Host: Pretoria, South Africa; Venue: Tswane Show Grounds; Level: Future Series; Format: 64MS/32WS/16MD/16WD/32XD	Score: 21–17, 21–17	
2 December	South Africa International: Host: Pretoria, South Africa; Venue: Tswane Show Grounds; Level: Future Series; Format: 64MS/32WS/16MD/16WD/32XD	(Italy) Katharina Fink (Italy) Yasmine Hamza	(South Africa) Megan de Beer (South Africa) Johanita Scholtz
2 December	South Africa International: Host: Pretoria, South Africa; Venue: Tswane Show Grounds; Level: Future Series; Format: 64MS/32WS/16MD/16WD/32XD	Score: 16–21, 21–15, 21–16	
2 December	South Africa International: Host: Pretoria, South Africa; Venue: Tswane Show Grounds; Level: Future Series; Format: 64MS/32WS/16MD/16WD/32XD	(Egypt) Adham Hatem Elgamal (Egypt) Doha Hany	(South Africa) Jarred Elliott (South Africa) Megan de Beer
2 December	South Africa International: Host: Pretoria, South Africa; Venue: Tswane Show Grounds; Level: Future Series; Format: 64MS/32WS/16MD/16WD/32XD	Score: 21–19, 19–21, 21–17	
9 December	BWF World Tour Finals (Draw): Host: Guangzhou, China; Venue: Tianhe Gymnasium; Level: World Tour Finals; Prize: $1,500,000	(Japan) Kento Momota	(Indonesia) Anthony Sinisuka Ginting
9 December	BWF World Tour Finals (Draw): Host: Guangzhou, China; Venue: Tianhe Gymnasium; Level: World Tour Finals; Prize: $1,500,000	Score: 17–21, 21–17, 21–14	
9 December	BWF World Tour Finals (Draw): Host: Guangzhou, China; Venue: Tianhe Gymnasium; Level: World Tour Finals; Prize: $1,500,000	(China) Chen Yufei	(Chinese Taipei) Tai Tzu-ying
9 December	BWF World Tour Finals (Draw): Host: Guangzhou, China; Venue: Tianhe Gymnasium; Level: World Tour Finals; Prize: $1,500,000	Score: 12–21, 21–12, 21–17	
9 December	BWF World Tour Finals (Draw): Host: Guangzhou, China; Venue: Tianhe Gymnasium; Level: World Tour Finals; Prize: $1,500,000	(Indonesia) Mohammad Ahsan (Indonesia) Hendra Setiawan	(Japan) Hiroyuki Endo (Japan) Yuta Watanabe
9 December	BWF World Tour Finals (Draw): Host: Guangzhou, China; Venue: Tianhe Gymnasium; Level: World Tour Finals; Prize: $1,500,000	Score: 24–22, 21–19	
9 December	BWF World Tour Finals (Draw): Host: Guangzhou, China; Venue: Tianhe Gymnasium; Level: World Tour Finals; Prize: $1,500,000	(China) Chen Qingchen (China) Jia Yifan	(Japan) Mayu Matsumoto (Japan) Wakana Nagahara
9 December	BWF World Tour Finals (Draw): Host: Guangzhou, China; Venue: Tianhe Gymnasium; Level: World Tour Finals; Prize: $1,500,000	Score: 21–14, 21–10	
9 December	BWF World Tour Finals (Draw): Host: Guangzhou, China; Venue: Tianhe Gymnasium; Level: World Tour Finals; Prize: $1,500,000	(China) Zheng Siwei (China) Huang Yaqiong	(China) Wang Yilü (China) Huang Dongping
9 December	BWF World Tour Finals (Draw): Host: Guangzhou, China; Venue: Tianhe Gymnasium; Level: World Tour Finals; Prize: $1,500,000	Score: 21–14, 21–14	
9 December	Bangladesh International: Host: Dhaka, Bangladesh; Venue: Shaheed Tajuddin Ahmed Indoor Stadium; Level: International Challenge; Prize: $25,000; Format: 64MS/32WS/32MD/16WD/32XD	(India) Lakshya Sen	(Malaysia) Leong Jun Hao
9 December	Bangladesh International: Host: Dhaka, Bangladesh; Venue: Shaheed Tajuddin Ahmed Indoor Stadium; Level: International Challenge; Prize: $25,000; Format: 64MS/32WS/32MD/16WD/32XD	Score: 22–20, 21–18	
9 December	Bangladesh International: Host: Dhaka, Bangladesh; Venue: Shaheed Tajuddin Ahmed Indoor Stadium; Level: International Challenge; Prize: $25,000; Format: 64MS/32WS/32MD/16WD/32XD	(Vietnam) Nguyễn Thùy Linh	(United States) Crystal Pan
9 December	Bangladesh International: Host: Dhaka, Bangladesh; Venue: Shaheed Tajuddin Ahmed Indoor Stadium; Level: International Challenge; Prize: $25,000; Format: 64MS/32WS/32MD/16WD/32XD	Score: 21–8, 21–16	
9 December	Bangladesh International: Host: Dhaka, Bangladesh; Venue: Shaheed Tajuddin Ahmed Indoor Stadium; Level: International Challenge; Prize: $25,000; Format: 64MS/32WS/32MD/16WD/32XD	(Malaysia) Chang Yee Jun (Malaysia) Tee Kai Wun	(India) Arjun M.R. (India) Dhruv Kapila
9 December	Bangladesh International: Host: Dhaka, Bangladesh; Venue: Shaheed Tajuddin Ahmed Indoor Stadium; Level: International Challenge; Prize: $25,000; Format: 64MS/32WS/32MD/16WD/32XD	Score: 21–19, 21–16	
9 December	Bangladesh International: Host: Dhaka, Bangladesh; Venue: Shaheed Tajuddin Ahmed Indoor Stadium; Level: International Challenge; Prize: $25,000; Format: 64MS/32WS/32MD/16WD/32XD	(Malaysia) Pearly Tan Koong Le (Malaysia) Thinaah Muralitharan	(India) K. Maneesha (India) Rutaparna Panda
9 December	Bangladesh International: Host: Dhaka, Bangladesh; Venue: Shaheed Tajuddin Ahmed Indoor Stadium; Level: International Challenge; Prize: $25,000; Format: 64MS/32WS/32MD/16WD/32XD	Score: 22–20, 21–19	
9 December	Bangladesh International: Host: Dhaka, Bangladesh; Venue: Shaheed Tajuddin Ahmed Indoor Stadium; Level: International Challenge; Prize: $25,000; Format: 64MS/32WS/32MD/16WD/32XD	(Malaysia) Hoo Pang Ron (Malaysia) Cheah Yee See	(Malaysia) Choong Hon Jian (Malaysia) Payee Lim Peiy Yee
9 December	Bangladesh International: Host: Dhaka, Bangladesh; Venue: Shaheed Tajuddin Ahmed Indoor Stadium; Level: International Challenge; Prize: $25,000; Format: 64MS/32WS/32MD/16WD/32XD	Score: 21–8, 21–19	
9 December	Italian International: Host: Milan, Italy; Venue: PalaBadminton; Level: International Challenge; Prize: $25,000; Format: 32MS/32WS/32MD/32WD/32XD	(France) Christo Popov	(India) Subhankar Dey
9 December	Italian International: Host: Milan, Italy; Venue: PalaBadminton; Level: International Challenge; Prize: $25,000; Format: 32MS/32WS/32MD/32WD/32XD	Score: 21–16, 22–20	
9 December	Italian International: Host: Milan, Italy; Venue: PalaBadminton; Level: International Challenge; Prize: $25,000; Format: 32MS/32WS/32MD/32WD/32XD	(Spain) Carolina Marín	(India) Rituparna Das
9 December	Italian International: Host: Milan, Italy; Venue: PalaBadminton; Level: International Challenge; Prize: $25,000; Format: 32MS/32WS/32MD/32WD/32XD	Score: 21–19, 21–14	
9 December	Italian International: Host: Milan, Italy; Venue: PalaBadminton; Level: International Challenge; Prize: $25,000; Format: 32MS/32WS/32MD/32WD/32XD	(Germany) Bjarne Geiss (Germany) Jan Colin Völker	(France) Christo Popov (France) Toma Junior Popov
9 December	Italian International: Host: Milan, Italy; Venue: PalaBadminton; Level: International Challenge; Prize: $25,000; Format: 32MS/32WS/32MD/32WD/32XD	Score: 21–18, 21–16	
9 December	Italian International: Host: Milan, Italy; Venue: PalaBadminton; Level: International Challenge; Prize: $25,000; Format: 32MS/32WS/32MD/32WD/32XD	(Bulgaria) Gabriela Stoeva (Bulgaria) Stefani Stoeva	(Russia) Ekaterina Bolotova (Russia) Alina Davletova
9 December	Italian International: Host: Milan, Italy; Venue: PalaBadminton; Level: International Challenge; Prize: $25,000; Format: 32MS/32WS/32MD/32WD/32XD	Score: 21–11, 21–14	
9 December	Italian International: Host: Milan, Italy; Venue: PalaBadminton; Level: International Challenge; Prize: $25,000; Format: 32MS/32WS/32MD/32WD/32XD	(Russia) Vladimir Ivanov (Russia) Ekaterina Bolotova	(South Korea) Kim Sa-rang (South Korea) Eom Hye-won
9 December	Italian International: Host: Milan, Italy; Venue: PalaBadminton; Level: International Challenge; Prize: $25,000; Format: 32MS/32WS/32MD/32WD/32XD	Score: 21–12, 18–21, 21–15	
16 December	U.S. International: Host: Orange County, United States; Venue: Orange County Badminton Club; Level: International Challenge; Prize: $25,000	(Japan) Kodai Naraoka	(Canada) Jason Ho-shue
16 December	U.S. International: Host: Orange County, United States; Venue: Orange County Badminton Club; Level: International Challenge; Prize: $25,000	Score: 21–13, 21–14	
16 December	U.S. International: Host: Orange County, United States; Venue: Orange County Badminton Club; Level: International Challenge; Prize: $25,000	(Vietnam) Vũ Thị Trang	(Canada) Brittney Tam
16 December	U.S. International: Host: Orange County, United States; Venue: Orange County Badminton Club; Level: International Challenge; Prize: $25,000	Score: 21–14, 20–22, 21–11	
16 December	U.S. International: Host: Orange County, United States; Venue: Orange County Badminton Club; Level: International Challenge; Prize: $25,000	(Chinese Taipei) Chen Xin-yuan (Chinese Taipei) Lin Yu-chieh	(Canada) Jason Ho-shue (Canada) Nyl Yakura
16 December	U.S. International: Host: Orange County, United States; Venue: Orange County Badminton Club; Level: International Challenge; Prize: $25,000	Score: 23–21, 22–20	
16 December	U.S. International: Host: Orange County, United States; Venue: Orange County Badminton Club; Level: International Challenge; Prize: $25,000	(Australia) Setyana Mapasa (Australia) Gronya Somerville	(Canada) Rachel Honderich (Canada) Kristen Tsai
16 December	U.S. International: Host: Orange County, United States; Venue: Orange County Badminton Club; Level: International Challenge; Prize: $25,000	Score: 14–21, 21–9, 21–18	
16 December	U.S. International: Host: Orange County, United States; Venue: Orange County Badminton Club; Level: International Challenge; Prize: $25,000	(Canada) Joshua Hurlburt-Yu (Canada) Josephine Wu	(Chinese Taipei) Lu Chia-pin (Chinese Taipei) Lin Wan-ching
16 December	U.S. International: Host: Orange County, United States; Venue: Orange County Badminton Club; Level: International Challenge; Prize: $25,000	Score: 21–18, 21–18	
16 December	Turkey Open: Host: Ankara, Turkey; Venue: Olympic Center Ankara; Level: International Series; Prize: $10,000; Format: 32MS/32WS/32MD/32WD/32XD	(Spain) Luís Enrique Peñalver	(Canada) Brian Yang
16 December	Turkey Open: Host: Ankara, Turkey; Venue: Olympic Center Ankara; Level: International Series; Prize: $10,000; Format: 32MS/32WS/32MD/32WD/32XD	Score: 21–19, 21–19	
16 December	Turkey Open: Host: Ankara, Turkey; Venue: Olympic Center Ankara; Level: International Series; Prize: $10,000; Format: 32MS/32WS/32MD/32WD/32XD	(Turkey) Neslihan Yiğit	(Turkey) Aliye Demirbağ
16 December	Turkey Open: Host: Ankara, Turkey; Venue: Olympic Center Ankara; Level: International Series; Prize: $10,000; Format: 32MS/32WS/32MD/32WD/32XD	Score: 21–14, 22–20	
16 December	Turkey Open: Host: Ankara, Turkey; Venue: Olympic Center Ankara; Level: International Series; Prize: $10,000; Format: 32MS/32WS/32MD/32WD/32XD	(Denmark) Mikkel Stoffersen (Denmark) Mads Vestergaard	(Turkey) Serdar Koca (Turkey) Serhat Salim
16 December	Turkey Open: Host: Ankara, Turkey; Venue: Olympic Center Ankara; Level: International Series; Prize: $10,000; Format: 32MS/32WS/32MD/32WD/32XD	Score: 21–19, 21–8	
16 December	Turkey Open: Host: Ankara, Turkey; Venue: Olympic Center Ankara; Level: International Series; Prize: $10,000; Format: 32MS/32WS/32MD/32WD/32XD	(Turkey) Bengisu Erçetin (Turkey) Nazlıcan İnci	(Turkey) Zehra Erdem (Turkey) İlayda Özelgül
16 December	Turkey Open: Host: Ankara, Turkey; Venue: Olympic Center Ankara; Level: International Series; Prize: $10,000; Format: 32MS/32WS/32MD/32WD/32XD	Score: 21–13, 21–15	
16 December	Turkey Open: Host: Ankara, Turkey; Venue: Olympic Center Ankara; Level: International Series; Prize: $10,000; Format: 32MS/32WS/32MD/32WD/32XD	(Denmark) Mikkel Stoffersen (Denmark) Susan Ekelund	(Denmark) Mads Vestergaard (Denmark) Sofie Nyvang
16 December	Turkey Open: Host: Ankara, Turkey; Venue: Olympic Center Ankara; Level: International Series; Prize: $10,000; Format: 32MS/32WS/32MD/32WD/32XD	Score: 21–17, 18–21, 21–13	

== BWF Player of the Year Awards ==
The followings are the nominees and the winners of the 2019 BWF Player of the Year Awards.

Player of the Year
Male Player of the Year	Female player of the Year
(Japan) Kento Momota (Men's singles); (Indonesia) Marcus Fernaldi Gideon / Kevin Sanjaya Sukamuljo (Men's doubles); (China) Zheng Siwei (Mixed doubles); (Indonesia) Mohammad Ahsan / Hendra Setiawan (Men's doubles)	(China) Huang Yaqiong (Mixed doubles); (Chinese Taipei) Tai Tzu-ying (Women's singles); (Japan) Yuki Fukushima / Sayaka Hirota (Women's doubles); (China) Chen Qingchen / Jia Yifan (Women's doubles)
Eddy Choong Most Promising Player of the Year
(South Korea) An Se-young (Women's singles); (Japan) Koki Watanabe (Men's singles); (Indonesia) Leo Rolly Carnando / Daniel Marthin (Men's doubles); (Thailand) Kantaphon Wangcharoen (Men's singles)
Most Improved Player of the Year
(South Korea) Kim So-yeong / Kong Hee-yong (Women's doubles); (Canada) Michelle Li (Women's singles); (India) Satwiksairaj Rankireddy / Chirag Shetty (Men's doubles); (Indonesia) Praveen Jordan / Melati Daeva Oktavianti (Mixed doubles)
Para-badminton Player of the Year
Male Para-badminton Player of the Year	Female Para-badminton Player of the Year
(China) Qu Zimo; (France) Lucas Mazur; (India) Pramod Bhagat; (Indonesia) Dheva Anrimusthi	(Indonesia) Leani Ratri Oktila; (Japan) Sarina Satomi; (China) Liu Yutong; (Japan) Ayako Suzuki

== Retirements ==
Following is a list of notable players (winners of a main tour title, and/or part of the BWF Rankings top 100 for at least one week) who announced their retirement from professional badminton, during the 2019 season:

- Liliyana Natsir (born 9 September 1985 in Manado, North Sulawesi, Indonesia) reached a career high of no. 1 in the mixed doubles event with two different partners. Having won 51 individual titles, including a gold at the 2016 Rio Summer Olympics, four golds at the World Championships, and a gold at the World Cup. She officially announced her retirement on 27 January 2019. The 2019 Indonesia Masters was her last tournament.
- Debby Susanto (born 3 May 1989 in Palembang, South Sumatra, Indonesia) reached a career high of no. 2 in the mixed doubles event on 2 November 2016. She won a mixed doubles bronze medal at the 2014 Incheon Asian Games, in addition to 7 individual titles. She announced her retirement at the 2019 Djarum Superliga Badminton tournament on 24 February 2019. The 2019 Indonesia Masters was her last tournament.
- Kamilla Rytter Juhl (born 23 November 1983 in Skagen, Denmark) reached a career high of no. 1 in the mixed doubles and no.2 in the women's doubles event. She won silver medal at the 2016 Rio Olympics; a gold, a silver, and two bronze medals at the World Championships; seven gold, a silver, and two bronze medals at the European Championships; also 24 titles in BWF sanctioned tournaments, with the prestigious 2018 All England Open as her last title. She announced her retirement in July 2018, due to her being pregnant, and officially announced her retirement from the BWF World Tour on 11 March 2019.
- Christinna Pedersen (born 12 May 1986 in Aalborg, Denmark) reached a career high of no. 1 in the mixed doubles and no.2 in the women's doubles event. She won a silver and a bronze medal at the Olympic Games; a silver, and four bronze medals at the World Championships; six gold, and two silver medals at the European Championships; also 36 titles in BWF sanctioned tournaments, with the prestigious 2018 All England Open as her last title. She officially announced her retirement from the BWF World Tour on 11 March 2019. The 2019 Swiss Open was her last tournament.
- Tang Jinhua (born 8 January 1992 in Nanjing, Jiangsu, China) reached a career high of no. 1 in the women's doubles on 29 May 2014. She was part of the national team that won the 2009 and 2010 World Junior Championships, 2010 Asian Junior Championships, 2013 Sudirman Cup, also in 2014 and 2016 Uber Cup. In the individual events, she was two times girls' doubles gold medalists at the Asian Junior Championships and once in World Junior. Tang had captured 23 senior titles in the women's and mixed doubles events. She announced her retirement on her Weibo account on 16 May 2019. The 2018 Korea Open was her last tournament.
- Lee Chong Wei (born 21 October 1982 in Bagan Serai, Perak, Malaysia) reached a career high of no. 1 in the men's singles on 29 June 2006, spent a whopping 349 weeks, including a 199-week streak from 2008 to 2012. He won three silver medals at the Summer Olympics in 2008 Beijing, 2012 London, and 2016 Rio. He had bagged 69 titles throughout his career, including 46 titles in high level BWF Superseries event. He diagnosed with early-stage nose cancer in July 2018, and after treatment in Taiwan, he announced that he had no intention to retire. Lee finally was unable to compete in high-level tournament after failing several times tests from his doctor, and announced his retirement on 13 June 2019. The 2018 Indonesia Open was his last tournament.
- Jacco Arends (born 28 January 1991 in Haarlem, the Netherlands) reached a career high of no. 12 in the mixed doubles on 26 November 2015. He was a bronze medalist at the 2016 European Championships, having won 13 individual titles, including a Grand Prix title. He announced his retirement from the professional badminton through his Instagram account on 17 July 2019. The 2019 U.S. Open was his last tournament.
- Rajiv Ouseph (born 30 August 1986 in Hounslow, London, England) reached a career high of no. 10 in the men's singles on 27 October 2016. He was a gold medalist at the 2017 European Championships, had collected five Commonwealth Games medals, won eleven BWF events including 2010 U.S. Open, and in 2016 Rio Olympics, he became the first Great Britain men's singles player to reach the Olympic quarterfinals. He announced his retirement on 17 July 2019, and after went down in the first of the 2019 BWF World Championships on 19 August, became his last career as a professional badminton player. Ouseph hopes to return to badminton in a coaching or advisory capacity.
- Yu Xiaohan (born 29 September 1994 in Huaibei, Anhui, China) reached a career high of no. 9 in the women's doubles on 3 May 2018. She was part of the national team that won the 2011 Asian and 2012 World Junior Championships. She captured 12 individual events titles, including 2015 Singapore and 2017 Korea Opens. She announced her retirement through her personal social media Weibo on 13 October 2019, where before, she had given a resignation letter to the coach on 30 September 2019. The 2019 Belarus International was her last title and tournament.
- Li Xuerui (born 24 January 1991 in Chongqing, China) reached a career high of no. 1 in the women's singles on 20 December 2012. Having won 27 individual titles, including a gold at the 2012 London Summer Olympics. She helped the national team win the Uber Cup in 2012, 2014 and 2016; the Sudirman Cup in 2013 and 2015; and at the Asian Games in 2014. She was awarded the BWF Female Player of the Year in 2013. BWF website announced her retirement from the international tournaments on 17 October 2019. The 2019 Korea Open was her last tournament.
- Lu Kai (born 4 October 1991 in Nanning, Guangxi, China) reached a career high of no. 2 in the mixed doubles on 2 February 2018. He won the gold medals at the 2009 Asian Junior Championships and 2017 Asian Championships. At the BWF Tour (Superseries and Grand Prix events), he captured 11 titles, including the 2017 All England Open. He announced his retirement through his personal Weibo account on 21 November 2019, ending his 11-year career with the national team, therefore also no longer be playing at international tournaments. The 2019 Hong Kong Open was his last tournament.
- Lee Hyun-il (born 17 April 1980 in Seoul, South Korea) reached a career high of no. 1 in the men's singles on 21 February 2004. Lee previously announced his retirement from international badminton and only competed in national competitions after the 2008 Beijing Olympics. However, he made a came back in April 2010. He competed in three consecutive Olympic Games in 2004, 2008 and 2012. He was a bronze medalist in 2006 World Championships, and was part of the national team that won the 2002, 2014 Asian Games and 2003 Sudirman Cup. At the BWF tour, he has collected 25 titles. Lee who joined the Miryang City team in 2018, announced his retirement on 22 November 2019. He won his last international title in 2018 Macau Open, and the 2019 Italian International became his last tournament.
- Minatsu Mitani (born 4 September 1991 in Ishikawa Prefecture, Japan) reached a career high of world no. 9 in the women's singles. She competed at the 2014 Asian Games, won a bronze medal in 2014 BWF World Championships and collected six international individual titles. She expressed his desire to retire after lost in the second round of 73rd All Japan Comprehensive Championships on 28 November, and officially announced her retirement at the first day of 2019 S/J League on 20 December. The 2019 Akita Masters was her last international tournament.
- Ayane Kurihara (born 27 September 1989 in Kitakyushu, Fukuoka, Japan) reached a career high of world no. 11 in the mixed doubles. She spent 22 years in badminton career, and entered the national team at the age of nineteen. Kurihara competed at the 2016 Summer Olympics, and collected seven international individual titles. She announced her retirement through her Twitter account on 23 December 2019. The 2019 Korea Masters was her last tournament.
